= List of shipwrecks in 2025 =

The list of shipwrecks in 2025 includes ships sunk, foundered, grounded, or otherwise lost during 2025.

table of contents
2025
Jan	Feb	Mar	Apr
May	Jun	Jul	Aug
Sep	Oct	Nov	Dec

== January ==
=== 2 January ===
List of shipwrecks: 2 January 2025
Ship	State	Description
Glyvursnes	Faroe Islands	The ro-ro cargo ship caught fire at Hirtshals, Denmark. A crew member was killed and another was severely injured.
Kulle Christoph	Germany	The fishing vessel sank in the Baltic Sea at dock at Heikendorf. She was expected to be refloated.
Unnamed	Tunisia	A migrant boat capsized off the Kerkennah Islands with the loss of 27 of the 52 people on board.

=== 3 January ===
List of shipwrecks: 3 January 2025
Ship	State	Description
Guardian	United States	The fishing vessel ran aground near Wellfleet, Massachusetts. The United States Coast Guard dispatched a tug and she was refloated.

=== 4 January ===
List of shipwrecks: 4 January 2025
Ship	State	Description
Panoria	Marshall Islands	The bulk carrier caught fire in the South China Sea 23 nautical miles (43 km) off Cape Elubani, Taiwan. She was on a voyage from Nantong, China to Singapore. Four of her crew were injured, one seriously. A tug was requested to tow her in to Kaohsiung, Taiwan.
Unnamed fishing boat	South Korea	A fishing boat ran aground near Gageodo, South Korea after colliding with coastal rocks. Three people were killed, nineteen were rescued.

=== 6 January ===
List of shipwrecks: 6 January 2025
Ship	State	Description
Kvalnes	Norway	The fishing vessel ran aground near Hellbergsøya. She was refloated.
Omaha Maru No.8	Japan	The fishing vessel capsized 17 nautical miles (31 km) off Kitaibaraki with the loss of two of her twenty crew. Three people were reported missing.
Sanwa Maru	Japan	The tanker ran aground off Cape Esan.

=== 8 January ===
List of shipwrecks: 8 January 2025
Ship	State	Description
Bram Force	Brazil	The service vessel caught fire in the Atlantic Ocean off Rio de Janeiro. Her crew were evacuated. She was subsequently towed in to Superporto do Açu.

=== 11 January ===
List of shipwrecks: 11 January 2025
Ship	State	Description
Dolphin 18	Vietnam	The cargo ship sank approximately 274 nautical miles (507 km) southwest of Vũng Tàu. All eighteen crew were rescued from lifeboats by Nicolai Maersk (Hong Kong).

=== 12 January ===
List of shipwrecks: 12 January 2025
Ship	State	Description
Kerstin	Netherlands	The motor barge suffered a steering failure in the Main near Aschaffenburg, Germany and became wedged at the entrance of a lock whilst avoiding a collision with the passenger ship Amadeus Silver II (Germany). Kerstin was refloated with assistance from the motor barges Käthe Krieger and Henneburg (both Germany).
Silver Sincere	Malaysia	The oil products tanker took on water and sank, reportedly off Pedra Branca, Singapore (01°17′N 104°22′E), however wreck was discovered 13 miles away off Bintan Regency in the Riau Islands, Indonesia in March, 2025. All eight crew were rescued from lifeboats by Intan Daya 368 (Indonesia). Removal efforts to begin in 2026.

=== 13 January ===
List of shipwrecks: 13 January 2025
Ship	State	Description
Ameray 888	Thailand	The catamaran sank about 1.6 nautical miles (3.0 km) north of Koh Racha Yai, Thailand, south of Phuket. Thirty-eight people, including 33 Chinese tourists, were rescued.

=== 14 January ===
List of shipwrecks: 14 January 2025
Ship	State	Description
MTS Terramare	United Kingdom	ro-ro survey vessel suffered engine failure and went adrift. MTS Terramare was pushed by 0.91-to-1.52-metre (3 to 5 ft) waves until she washed up on the beach at high tide in St. Brides Bay off Newgale Beach, Pembrokeshire, Wales. Her crew evacuated onto the beach.

=== 15 January ===
List of shipwrecks: 15 January 2025
Ship	State	Description
Tanusha	United States	The fishing trawler capsized and sank in the Gulf of Alaska 23 miles (37 km) southeast of Kodiak, Alaska. Her crew was rescued by Victory (United States).
Unnamed	Flag unknown	A vessel carrying 86 persons that departed Mauritania on 2 January capsized off Western Sahara. Fifty people were killed.

=== 17 January ===
List of shipwrecks: 17 January 2025
Ship	State	Description
Miss Sandy	United States	The fishing vessel sprang a leak and sank approximately 7 nautical miles (13 km) off Gloucester, Massachusetts. All eighteen crew were rescued by USCGC William Chadwick (United States Coast Guard).

=== 19 January ===
List of shipwrecks: 19 January 2025
Ship	State	Description
Princess X95	United States	The yacht burned, capsized and sank in the Miami River at dock at the Booby Trap, Miami, Florida.

=== 22 January ===
List of shipwrecks: 22 January 2025
Ship	State	Description
Unnamed submarine	Flag unknown	An abandoned suspected narco-submarine was found by the fishing vessel Maria Cristina (Spain) at the entrance to the Camarinas-Muxia estuary, Galicia, Spain. While being towed to the port of Camariñas it broke in two with the aft section sinking.

=== 23 January ===
List of shipwrecks: 23 January 2025
Ship	State	Description
LCT Cahaya Dana Reza	Indonesia	The tank landing craft sprang a leak, capsized, and sank in shallow water with some of her hull above water near Kotabaru Regency, South Kalimantan, Borneo. All nine crew were rescued by the tugboat Atlantik Star 11 (Indonesia).
Mattie and Maren II	United States	The fishing trawler was sunk due to hull damage in a collision with the scalloper Vanquish (United States) in the Atlantic Ocean approximately 10 nautical miles (19 km) south of Block Island, Rhode Island in foul weather.

=== 25 January ===
List of shipwrecks: 25 January 2025
Ship	State	Description
Wei Sen No. 8	Belize	The tanker ran aground near the Matsu Islands. Seven crew were rescued by the Taiwan Coast Guard, one died during the rescue.

=== 28 January ===
List of shipwrecks: 28 January 2025
Ship	State	Description
Calimero Sampa	Italy	The fishing vessel ran aground on a reef in the Adriatic Sea 250 metres (270 yd) off the beach just west of Cesenatico, Italy, and capsized over onto her starboard side partially submerged.
Guang Rong	Cyprus	Storm Herminia: The cargo ship dragged anchor in a storm at Marina Di Carrara anchorage and crashed into a pier at Tuscan Sea Resort, Italy and then was driven ashore with a starboard list. Her thirteen crew survived.

=== 31 January ===
List of shipwrecks: 31 January 2025
Ship	State	Description
Hula Girl	United States	The catamaran was driven aground in Honolua Bay, Maui, Hawaii, by a storm. She was refloated on 14 March.

== February ==
=== 1 February ===
List of shipwrecks: 1 February 2025
Ship	State	Description
Samgwangho, and Manseonho	South Korea	The fishing vessels ran aground at the same place on rocks 500 metres (550 yd) off Rabbit Island in Gujwa-eup, Jeju City in stormy weather. The captain of Samgwangho and a crewman of Manseonho suffered heart attacks and later died.

=== 3 February ===
List of shipwrecks: 3 February 2025
Ship	State	Description
Unnamed	South Korea	The fishing vessel capsized about 450 nautical miles (833 km) southwest of Jeju Island, near Taiwan. Her ten crew were rescued.

=== 4 February ===
List of shipwrecks: 4 February 2025
Ship	State	Description
Putri Papua	Indonesia	The pinisi sank in the Pacific Ocean 12 nautical miles (22 km) off Sorong, Southwest Papua, Indonesia, after engine failure.

=== 6 February ===
List of shipwrecks: 6 February 2025
Ship	State	Description
Fortune Pride	Canada	The fishing vessel sank approximately 9.7 nautical miles (18 km) southeast of Sambro, Nova Scotia. Of the four crew aboard the vessel, three were rescued, with one of the three dying in hospital later. The fourth crew member was found deceased in a life raft at sea.

=== 8 February ===
List of shipwrecks: 8 February 2025
Ship	State	Description
An Yang 2	China	The bulk carrier stranded in the shallow water in a snowstorm off Nevelsky District, Sakhalin Oblast, Sakhalin island, Russia.

=== 9 February ===
List of shipwrecks: 9 February 2025
Ship	State	Description
Koala	Antigua and Barbuda	The tanker settled to the bottom at dock in the harbour following explosions in her engine room at Ust-Luga, Leningrad Oblast, Russia.
Unnamed	Korea Coast Guard	A Korea Coast Guard high speed boat capsized in high waves searching for the fishing vessel 22 Seokyung (South Korea). Her crew were rescued by other Coast Guard vessels.
22 Seokyung	South Korea	The fishing vessel capsized and sank in 80 metres (260 ft) of water about 9.2 nautical miles (17 km) east of Habaek Island, about 170 nautical miles (315 km) south of Seoul. Of the fourteen crew, four, including her captain, died, and five were reported missing.

=== 10 February ===
List of shipwrecks: 10 February 2025
Ship	State	Description
unknown	Peru	A boat sank on the Inambari River, killing thirteen people with one missing. Six others were injured.

=== 12 February ===
List of shipwrecks: 12 February 2025
Ship	State	Description
2066 Jae Sung Ho	South Korea	The fishing vessel capsized approximately 6.5 nautical miles (12 km) southwest of Pyoseon-myeon, Seogwipo, Jeju Island. Five of the ten crew were rescued.

=== 13 February ===
List of shipwrecks: 13 February 2025
Ship	State	Description
Cartela	Australia	The vessel partially sunk at her berth at Franklin, Tasmania.

=== 15 February ===
List of shipwrecks: 15 February 2025
Ship	State	Description
Lambousa II	Flag unknown	The 23-metre (75 ft) vessel was sunk as an artificial reef in 28 metres (92 ft) of water off the coast of Oroklini in the Oroklini marine protected area (34°57′N 33°41′E), Cyprus.
MSC Baltic III	Liberia	The container ship was driven aground at a cove variously called Cedar Cove, Wild Cove, or Capelin Cove, on the western coastline of Newfoundland and Labrador, Canada, west of Lark Harbour (note: this is a different Wild Cove from that of the Twillingate Islands on the eastern side of N.L.) The grounding happened after the ship lost power in severe weather conditions with winds exceeding 120 kilometres per hour (75 mph) and waves reaching 6 metres (20 ft) high. As of 20 February 2026 she is still aground, her hull is buckled amidships, the stern sinking, the port side hull had developed a large cracks and has buckled along both the port and starboard sides.
Unnamed	United Kingdom	A narrow boat/barge sank in the Oxford Canal between bridges 4 and 5.

=== 16 February ===
List of shipwrecks: 16 February 2025
Ship	State	Description
Unnamed	Vietnam	A barge capsized from boat wakes in An Giang province, Vietnam. The wife of a crewman was killed.

=== 18 February ===
List of shipwrecks: 18 February 2025
Ship	State	Description
Shayesteh	Iran	The cargo ship sprang a leak and sank in the Persian Gulf off the coast of Qatar. Her crew were rescued by USS Devastator (United States Navy) and USCGC Clarence Sutphin Jr. (United States Coast Guard).

=== 19 February ===
List of shipwrecks: 19 February 2025
Ship	State	Description
Western Gambler	Canada	The fishing vessel ran aground after springing a leak, listed and sank partially submerged at Napier Point, just south of Bella Bella, British Columbia. Her four crew were rescued. She was refloated on 26 February.

=== 22 February ===
List of shipwrecks: 22 February 2025
Ship	State	Description
Ashamba	Russia	The research vessel capsized and sank at dock near Novorossiysk due to icing during a winter storm. The wreck was expected to be raised in early 2025.

=== Unknown date ===
List of shipwrecks: unknown date February 2025
Ship	State	Description
Unnamed	North Korea	A cargo ship reportedly collided with a Chinese ship and sank in the Yellow Sea off the coast of China in late February. It was reported that fifteen to twenty crew were killed whilst a few others were rescued.

== March ==
=== 1 March ===
List of shipwrecks: 1 March 2025
Ship	State	Description
MSC Levante F	Panama	The container ship was severely damaged in what was reported as a Russian missile strike on the port of Odessa, Ukraine. The attack also injured two port workers.

=== 2 March ===
List of shipwrecks: 2 March 2025
Ship	State	Description
H&S Wisdom	Netherlands	The cargo ship ran aground on mud flats in the Humber Estuary at Brough, Yorkshire, United Kingdom. She was refloated on 15 March.
Huvan	Maldives	The ferry/launch capsized and sank in the Indian Ocean between Adh Dhigurah and Mahibadhoo. All three crew and 45 passengers were rescued from the water.
PW26	United Kingdom	The fishing vessel was wrecked on rocks and sank at The Rumps near Polzeath, Cornwall. Both crewmembers were rescued by a Royal National Lifeboat Institution lifeboat.
Unnamed	Colombia	A pleasure vessel sank after taking on water near Punta Barú. Thirty people were rescued by the Colombian Navy and twelve by a civilian vessel operating near the Rosario Islands.

=== 6 March ===
List of shipwrecks: 6 March 2025
Ship	State	Description
Cormorant II	Ecuador	The passenger ship ran aground near Punta Suárez, Española Island in the Galapagos Islands.
Unnamed	Yemen	Two migrant boats capsized during bad weather off the coast of Dhubab district, Taiz Governorate, Yemen. Two crew members were rescued while over 180 others were reported missing and presumed dead.

=== 7 March ===
List of shipwrecks: 7 March 2025
Ship	State	Description
Three unnamed yachts	Flags unknown	Three yachts were destroyed by fire on the Miami River in Miami, Florida.

=== 10 March ===
List of shipwrecks: 10 March 2025
Ship	State	Description
Siriwan Marine 5	Thailand	The passenger speedboat sank from a cracked hull caused by large swells in the Andaman Sea near Koh Poda Nok. Twenty-eight passengers and her crew were rescued.
Solong, Stena Immaculate	Portugal (Madeira); United States	The tanker Stena Immaculate was run into at anchor by the container ship Solong in the North Sea off Withernsea, East Yorkshire, United Kingdom. Both ships caught fire and were abandoned by their crews. A crew member of Solong was reported missing.

=== 14 March ===
List of shipwrecks: 14 March 2025
Ship	State	Description
Westport	Panama	The tug was sunk in a collision with the container ship A. Idefix (Malta) in the Pacific Ocean off Callao, Peru.

=== 17 March ===
List of shipwrecks: 17 March 2025
Ship	State	Description
Bangsata	Philippines	The wooden passenger/cargo ship sank in rough seas off the Taganak Islands in Tawi-Tawi, the Philippines. Thirty-two people were rescued.
Pico Tresmares	Spain	The fishing vessel caught fire in the Pacific Ocean roughly 860 nautical miles (1,590 km) off La Serena, Chile. She capsized and sank after her nineteen crew abandoned ship.
Provincia del Azuay	Ecuador	The tug sprang a leak and sank mostly submerged at her berth in Veracruz, Mexico. It was expected that she would be refloated.
Unnamed	Flag unknown	A boat capsized off the southeastern coast of Cyprus while transporting an unknown number of migrants. The bodies of seven deceased people, and two survivors, were recovered by Cyprus search and rescue teams.

=== 18 March ===
List of shipwrecks: 18 March 2025
Ship	State	Description
NA 80-209-TS	Vietnam	The fishing vessel sank about 5 nautical miles (9.3 km) east of Mat Island. One crew member was rescued, three others were reported missing.

=== 20 March ===
List of shipwrecks: 20 March 2025
Ship	State	Description
Unnamed	Germany	A barge sank in a gravel lake in Northeim, Germany.
Unnamed	Colombia	A pleasure vessel capsized and sank in adverse weather near Punta Gigantes, in the Ciénaga de los Vásquez, area of Punta Barú. Thirty-six German and two Austrian passengers, and two crew were rescued by the Colombian Navy and by civilian vessels.

=== 22 March ===
List of shipwrecks: 22 March 2025
Ship	State	Description
Fugro Mercator	Panama	The research vessel ran aground in harsh weather in the Mediterranean Sea off Elba, Italy. She was refloated on 29 March.

=== 25 March ===
List of shipwrecks: 25 March 2025
Ship	State	Description
Sadong 33	Philippines	The tug was towing LCT Sea Asia (Philippines) when the cargo ship Universe Kiza (Panama) cut between the two vessels catching the towline causing the tug to capsize off Maasim. Her captain and a crew member died.

=== 27 March ===
List of shipwrecks: 27 March 2025
Ship	State	Description
Ramonda	St. Vincent and Grenadines	The yacht caught fire at Porto Novi, Montenegro. She was towed out to sea and left to sink.
Sindbad	Egypt	Sindbad (right) in 2023. 2025 Red Sea tourist submarine disaster: The tourist submarine sank in the Red Sea off Hurghada, Egypt, with the loss of at least six lives. Thirty-nine passengers and five crew were rescued.

=== 29 March ===
List of shipwrecks: 29 March 2025
Ship	State	Description
De Zonnebloem	Netherlands	The Dutch river cruise ship collided with a cargo vessel on the Rhine near Wesel, Germany. The cruise ship suffered serious damage and was rendered inoperable. All 149 people on board, including 69 guests, were safely evacuated. The cargo ship’s captain was later found to have been under the influence of alcohol.
Jinaghai Zhida 66	China	The cargo ship was sunk in a collision with Ningyuan Beilun (China) near Yangxiaomao Island, Ningbo. A crew member died.

=== 30 March ===
List of shipwrecks: 30 March 2025
Ship	State	Description
Bruma	Chile	The 14.7-metre (48 ft) artisanal fishing vessel was sunk with all seven crew in a collision with fishing vessel Cobra (Chile) in the Gulf of Arauco off Coronel, Chile.

=== 31 March ===
List of shipwrecks: 31 March 2025
Ship	State	Description
Unnamed	New Zealand	A barge capsized onto its side, losing its crane, in the Bay of Plenty at a marina in Tauranga, New Zealand. Salvage was expected.

== April ==
=== 2 April ===
List of shipwrecks: 2 April 2025
Ship	State	Description
Jianghai Zhida 66	China	The bulk carrier sank in a collision with Ningyuan Beilun (China) off Yangxiaomao Island.
Nicky	Netherlands	The tanker-barge collided with the cargo ship Volturno just outside of the Kreekrak Locks in Reimerswaal, Zeeland. Nicky's port hull was holed above the waterline. No casualties were reported.
Volturno	Netherlands	The cargo ship collided with the tanker-barge Nicky just outside of the Kreekrak Locks in Reimerswaal, Zeeland, Netherlands. The bow of Volturno suffered bow damage. No casualties were reported.

=== 3 April ===
List of shipwrecks: 3 April 2025
Ship	State	Description
Lady Irene	United States	The fishing vessel sank after a fire at the Wellfleet marina in Wellfleet, Massachusetts. The fire also severely damaged the town’s deteriorating wooden L-pier. No casualties were reported.

=== 7 April ===
List of shipwrecks: 7 April 2025
Ship	State	Description
Baltica	Germany	The passenger ship sprang a leak and became flooded in the Baltic Sea near Kühlungsborn. The local fire brigade took out all of the water using dewatering pumps. No casualties were reported.

=== 8 April ===
List of shipwrecks: 8 April 2025
Ship	State	Description
Saeftinge	Netherlands	The barge caught fire on the Western Scheldt while berthed at Terneuzen, Zeeland. The local fire brigade were able to extinguish the fire. No casualties were reported.
TH 92686 TS	Vietnam	The fishing vessel sank in a collision with Hosei Crown (Panama) in fog in the Gulf of Tonkin. Four crew were killed, eight were rescued.

=== 9 April ===
List of shipwrecks: 9 April 2025
Ship	State	Description
Captain Hornblower	United States	The decommissioned tug was sunk as an artificial reef in the Gulf of Mexico 12 nautical miles (22 km) south of Panama City, Florida in 97 feet (30 m) of water.
CMA CGM Pelleas	Malta	The container ship ran aground and nearly struck a wall in the English Channel at Southampton, Hampshire, United Kingdom. tugs were able to pull the ship free. No injuries were reported and the ship went back en route to Rotterdam, South Holland, Netherlands.
Victoria L	Germany	The container ship caught fire and exploded in the North Sea west of Scheveningen, South Holland, Netherlands. She was on a voyage from Hamburg, Germany, to Rotterdam, South Holland. None of her nineteen crew were injured.

=== 10 April ===
List of shipwrecks: 12 April 2025
Ship	State	Description
Scot Bay	United Kingdom	The cargo ship, transporting a cargo of animal feed sailing from IJmuiden in North Holland, Netherlands, ran aground in the River Teign at Teignmouth, Devon. In the evening, tugs were able to pull the vessel free. No damage or casualties were reported.

=== 11 April ===
List of shipwrecks: 11 April 2025
Ship	State	Description
Eileen Rita	United States	Eileen Rita The scallop fishing vessel ran aground and sank near Green Island, Boston Harbor, Massachusetts, with the vessel reporting a maximum potential discharge of 4,000 US gallons (15,000 L; 3,300 imp gal) of diesel fuel and 50 US gallons (190 L; 42 imp gal) of lube oil. Her three crew were rescued by the United States Coast Guard Northeast Sector without injury.
Unnamed	United States	The boat after capsizing A boat smuggling immigrants capsized off St. Lucie Inlet in Florida. Four people were rescued by the United States Coast Guard while five others were killed.

=== 13 April ===
List of shipwrecks: 13 April 2025
Ship	State	Description
Miss Montie	United States	The fishing vessel lost power and drifted aground in the Atlantic Ocean near Beverly Beach, Florida.

=== 14 April ===
List of shipwrecks: 14 April 2025
Ship	State	Description
Nhô Padre Benjamim	Cape Verde	The ro-ro cargo vessel sprang a leak and sank in Preguiça Bay off São Nicolau, Cape Verde Islands. Nineteen crew and a passenger were rescued by fishing boats.

=== 15 April ===
List of shipwrecks: 15 April 2025
Ship	State	Description
HB Kongolo	Democratic Republic of the Congo	The wooden boat en voyage from Matankumu to Bolomba carrying around 400 people caught fire and capsized on the Congo River near Mbandaka, Democratic Republic of the Congo, killing at least 148 people and leaving hundreds more missing. The number of casualties was revised to 33 fatalities and 22 injuries on 20 April.
Hong Hai 16	China	The ship after capsizing The dredger capsized in the Mindoro Strait off Barangay Malawaano, Rizal, Occidental Mindoro, Philippines. Six crewmen were killed, and five others were reported missing.
Unnamed	Flag unknown	An Al-Shabab-linked cargo ship was sunk by United States Africa Command and Somali Federal Government airstrike south of Somalia's territorial waters.

=== 17 April ===
List of shipwrecks: 17 April 2025
Ship	State	Description
Papu Mar	Paraguay	The tug sank in the Indio Channel, in the Río de la Plata Punta near the Banco Chico reef off the coast of Argentina after springing a leak in a storm. At the time she was pushing the barge 240-4 (Paraguay), her crew escaping to the barge. The barge was later cut loose.

=== 25 April ===
List of shipwrecks: 25 April 2025
Ship	State	Description
Glengyle	Hong Kong	The bulk carrier partially sank by the stern in a collision with KMTC Surabaya (Panama) in the Lòng Tàu River at An Thới Đông, Ho Chi Minh City, Vietnam.

=== 27 April ===
List of shipwrecks: 27 April 2025
Ship	State	Description
Unnamed	United States	A barge sank in 75 feet (23 m) of water in a collision of her tow boat Ginny Rose (United States) with Isla De Bioko (Panama) in the Mississippi River below St. Rose, Louisiana at Mile Marker 110.

== May ==
=== 2 May ===
List of shipwrecks: 2 May 2025
Ship	State	Description
Conscience	Not flagged	The Freedom Flotilla Coalition claimed that their ship was damaged and set afire in the Mediterranean Sea off Malta in a drone attack by the Israeli military.
BAP Ucayali	Peruvian Navy	The Maranon-class gunboat struck the anchored oil barge El Manati resulting in a hull breach and sank in shallow water partially submerged in the Amazon River near the Napo River some 50 nautical miles (93 km) downstream from Iquitos, Peru. Thirty crew were rescued, two were killed, and one was reported missing.

=== 3 May ===
List of shipwrecks: 3 May 2025
Ship	State	Description
Queen of Sidney	Canada	The derelict Sidney-class ferry laid up at Mission, British Columbia caught fire. The fire resulted in a stay in place order, and the fire was extinguished.

=== 4 May ===
List of shipwrecks: 4 May 2025
Ship	State	Description
Jean Ribault	United States	The ro-ro ferry allided with a boarding ramp on the St. Johns River while departing from Mayport in Jacksonville, Florida, United States. No injuries were reported but the ferry was taken out of service.

=== 5 May ===
List of shipwrecks: 5 May 2025
Ship	State	Description
BRP Miguel Malvar	Philippine Navy	The decommissioned Malvar-class corvette, intended to be sunk as a target, sprang a leak and sank in the South China Sea 35 nautical miles (65 km) west of the coast of the Zambales province, Luzon.
KMP Muchlisa	Indonesia	The ferry/passenger ship sprang a leak, capsized and sank in the Makassar Strait off Penajam Paser Utara. Forty-two people were rescued, a crew member was killed, and another was reported missing.
Unnamed	United States	A barge sank in a collision of her tow boat Myra Eckstein (United States) with the Old Highway 80 Bridge on the Mississippi River at Vicksburg, Mississippi.
Unnamed	United States	A barge was sunk as an artificial reef in 115 feet (35 m) of water in the Gulf of Mexico 17 nautical miles (31 km) southeast of Destin, Florida (30°09′N 86°18′W).
Unnamed	United States	A panga fishing boat smuggling migrants from Mexico capsized off the coast of a beach in Del Mar, California. Four people were killed, and eight others were rescued, including four with injuries.

=== 6 May ===
List of shipwrecks: 6 May 2025
Ship	State	Description
Vollsøy	Norway	A fire broke out in the engine room while the ship was undergoing maintenance at Mekjarvik. The fire was quickly extinguished and no injuries were reported.

=== 8 May ===
List of shipwrecks: 8 May 2025
Ship	State	Description
Carisma I, and Carisma II	Netherlands	The combined self-propelled barges split apart and allide with two moored passenger Viking ships on the Rhine river in Cologne, North Rhine-Westphalia, Germany. No significant damage or injuries were reported.

=== 9 May ===
List of shipwrecks: 9 May 2025
Ship	State	Description
Captain Raleigh	United States	The fishing vessel sprang a leak, capsized and sank in Grays Harbor off Westport, Washington. Three crew were rescued, and one was reported missing.

=== 10 May ===
List of shipwrecks: 10 May 2025
Ship	State	Description
Bijou Du Rhône	Malta	The river cruise ship collided with a cargo barge during a scheduled voyage on the Rhône river in Sablons, Isère, France. No injuries were reported among the 127 German tourist passengers and 39 crew but the collision resulted in damage to the ship's hull above the waterline.
Unnamed	flag unknown	A cargo barge collided with the river cruise ship Bijou Du Rhône (Malta) on the Rhône river in Sablons, Isère, France. No injuries were reported but the barge sustained significant structural damage.

=== 11 May ===
List of shipwrecks: 11 May 2025
Ship	State	Description
CMA CGM Ermitage	Malta	The container ship, en route from Bremerhaven allided with a wharf while trying to avoid a collision with a yacht on the Elbe river in Hamburg, Germany. No injuries were reported and the ship sustained no damage but the wharf and a gantry crane sustained damage.
MSC Antonia	Liberia	The container ship ran aground after possible GPS jamming in the Red Sea off Jeddah, Makkah Province, Saudi Arabia.

=== 12 May ===
List of shipwrecks: 12 May 2025
Ship	State	Description
Gulf Stream	Belgium	The self-propelled barge caught fire during welding on the ship while moored on the Oude Maas river in Dordrecht, South Holland, Netherlands. No injuries were reported and the fire was extinguished, but the barge sustained damage.

=== 13 May ===
List of shipwrecks: 13 May 2025
Ship	State	Description
Ablette	France	The fishing vessel caught fire and eventually sank in the Bay of Biscay 120 nautical miles (220 km) west of Gironde, France. Both crew members were rescued by the cargo ship FWN Sun (Netherlands).

=== 14 May ===
List of shipwrecks: 14 May 2025
Ship	State	Description
MSV Salamanth	India	The sailing cargo vessel encountered rough seas and was struck by a powerful wave, causing the vessel to sink in the Arabian Sea approximately 60 nautical miles (110 km) southwest of the coast of India. All six crew members were rescued by ICG Vikram (Indian Coast Guard).
Nuevo Marina	Spain	The fishing vessel caught fire and eventually sank in the Atlantic Ocean 3 nautical miles (5.6 km) off Monte Louro,. Both crew members were rescued by fishing vessel La Chainza (Spain).

=== 15 May ===
List of shipwrecks: 15 May 2025
Ship	State	Description
Julie	Paraguay	The tug was destroyed by fire in the Paraguay River near the Remanso Bridge. Her crew were rescued by fire fighters.
Trade	Marshall Islands	The bulk carrier caught fire while moored at a scrap terminal in Amsterdam, North Holland, Netherlands. The fire was extinguished after 27 hours.

=== 16 May ===
List of shipwrecks: 16 May 2025
Ship	State	Description
B309	Germany	The barge carrying sand ran aground near the entrance to a gravel pit on the Weser river near Porta Westfalica, North Rhine-Westphalia. No injuries were reported and the ship was refloated without damage, but the incident blocked river traffic in the area.
Ina XL	Netherlands	The tug sprang a leak and sank partially submerged while moored near the Noordkasteel Bridge in the port of Antwerp, Belgium.

=== 17 May ===
List of shipwrecks: 17 May 2025
Ship	State	Description
ARM Cuauhtémoc	Mexican Navy	Cuauhtémoc Brooklyn Bridge collision: The training ship, a barque, collided with the Brooklyn Bridge, New York City, United States, breaking her masts. Seventeen people were injured and two were killed.

=== 20 May ===
List of shipwrecks: 20 May 2025
Ship	State	Description
L'En-ma	France	The fishing trawler became completely engulfed in a six-hour fire at Port-en-Bessin-Huppain, Calvados.
Pacific Memory II	Indonesia	The fishing vessel capsized and sank in the Singapore Strait after a collision with the tanker Cosco Development (Hong Kong) approximately 15 nautical miles (27 km) northeast of Pedra Branca, Singapore. All 30 crew were rescued by Andros Spirit (Liberia).

=== 21 May ===
List of shipwrecks: 21 May 2025
Ship	State	Description
Kang Kon	North Korea	The Choe Hyon-class destroyer was left partially capsized with her bow on shore after a failure at her launching at the Hanbuk shipyard, Chongjin, North Korea. She was righted and then launched on 5 June.
Song Doc	Vietnam	The oil rig caught fire during decommissioning operations, killing one person and injuring seven. The fire was extinguished, and no oil spill occurred.
Unnamed	United States	A shrimp boat sank in the Possession Sound, off the coast of Everett, Washington, at a depth of 165 feet (50 m). Of the four people on board one survived, two died and one was reported missing.

=== 22 May ===
List of shipwrecks: 22 May 2025
Ship	State	Description
Frigg Sydfyen	Denmark	The ro-ro passenger ferry ran aground on a sandbar after strong winds in the Baltic Sea at Bøjden. No injuries were reported among the 50 passengers and crew members.
Ilse-Marie	Netherlands	The inland motor freighter ran aground on a sandbank near Stavoren, Friesland and sank.
Nautica	Belgium	The self-propelled barge ran aground along with the barge Swette in low water levels at the confluence of the Nete and Rupel rivers in Rumst, Belgium. No injuries were reported.
NCL Salten	Cyprus	The cargo ship ran aground and nearly crashed into a house in Byneset, Trondheim, Norway. All sixteen people on board were rescued without injury and an officer that fell asleep was charged. She was refloated on 27 May.
Swette	Netherlands	The long self-propelled barge ran aground along with the barge Nautica in low water levels at the confluence of the Nete and Rupel rivers. No injuries were reported.

=== 23 May ===
List of shipwrecks: 23 May 2025
Ship	State	Description
Torvang	Norway	The cargo ship listed and capsized at dock at Hendvågen quay in Averøy, partially submerged. Her crew survived.

=== 24 May ===
List of shipwrecks: 24 May 2025
Ship	State	Description
MSC Elsa 3	Liberia	MSC Elsa 3 sinking 2025 Kerala oil spill: The container ship, en route to Kochi from Vizhinjam, India carrying 640 containers—including 84 metric tons (83 long tons; 93 short tons) of diesel, 367 t (361 long tons; 405 short tons) of furnace oil, 13 with hazardous cargo and 12 with calcium carbide—listed and eventually sank in the Arabian Sea, 38 nautical miles (70 km) off the coast of Kochi. All 24 crew members were rescued by the Indian Coast Guard and the Indian Navy.

=== 25 May ===
List of shipwrecks: 25 May 2025
Ship	State	Description
Công Thành 07	Vietnam	The cargo ship sprang a leak, capsized, and sank in 30 metres (98 ft) of water in the South China Sea 7 nautical miles (13 km) off Ky Anh. Her crew were rescued.

=== 29 May ===
List of shipwrecks: 29 May 2025
Ship	State	Description
Unnamed	Bangladesh	Deep Depression BOB 01: A salt-laden fishing trawler sank in rough seas off Kutubdia Upazila. Eight people were reported missing.

=== 30 May ===
List of shipwrecks: 30 May 2025
Ship	State	Description
Al Herem	Marshall Islands	The tanker dragged anchor and was driven ashore in a storm in the Bay of Bengal north of Chattogram, Bangladesh.
B-LPG Sophia	Panama	The burned out tanker, at anchor since October 2024, was driven ashore in a storm in the Bay of Bengal near Chattogram.
Mermaid 3	India	The barge dragged her anchor and was driven ashore in a storm near Chattogram.
Navimar 3	Palau	The tug dragged her anchor and was driven ashore at Chattogram.

== June ==
=== 1 June ===
List of shipwrecks: 1 June 2025
Ship	State	Description
Lomaiviti Princess II	Fiji	The out-of-service ro-ro passenger ferry capsized and partially sank in 5 metres (16 ft) of water in Walu Bay, Suva Harbour, Fiji while under tow.
Ron Jeremy	Sweden	The 25-metre (82 ft) tug sprang a leak, capsized and sank in 40 metres (130 ft) of water in Bothnian Bay south of Rödkallen Lighthouse near Piteå. One crewman died.
Unnamed	Suriname	Seven people, at least three from French Guiana, died after an aluminium boat with fifteen occupants (10 French Guianan passengers and 5 crew members) capsized presumably due to a gust of wind and a large wave on the Maroni river near Albina. A day of national day of mourning in Suriname was held on 3 June.

=== 2 June ===
List of shipwrecks: 2 June 2025
Ship	State	Description
Skippin Sue	United States	The out-of-service tug was sunk as an artificial reef in 77 feet (23 m) of water in the Gulf of Mexico approximately 8 nautical miles (15 km) south of Destin, Florida (30°14′N 86°30′W).

=== 4 June ===
List of shipwrecks: 4 June 2025
Ship	State	Description
The Tanis	Indonesia	The 125-seat tourist ferry with 89 passengers and crew was swamped by a large wave and sank at Lembongan Village. Several passengers were injured, but no deaths were reported.

=== 8 June ===
List of shipwrecks: 8 June 2025
Ship	State	Description
OT 2439	Russia	The tug struck a submerged object breaching her hull in the Kazachinsky rapids on the Yenisei River in Siberia. She was run aground partially sunk.
Sea Horse	United States	The fishing vessel failed to return to port and was reported missing. The vessel was located sunk in Cape Cod Bay in 25 feet (7.6 m) of water near Billingsgate Shoal off Wellfleet, Massachusetts on 11 June. The bodies of both crew members were located on board.

=== 9 June ===
List of shipwrecks: 9 June 2025
Ship	State	Description
Wan Hai 503	Singapore	The container ship caught fire 50 nautical miles (93 km) off the Indian coast. She was on a voyage from Colombo, Sri Lanka to Nhava Sheva, India. As of 26 August, she was under tow for a port in the United Arab Emirates

=== 10 June ===
List of shipwrecks: 10 June 2025
Ship	State	Description
Maria Cristina	Spain	The fishing vessel ran aground in the Atlantic Ocean near Cabo Vilán. Her crew were rescued by A. Fervenza (Spain).

=== 11 June ===
List of shipwrecks: 11 June 2025
Ship	State	Description
Hein	Guyana	The cargo ship suffered a load shift causing a list. She was run aground to prevent capsizing, partially sunk on the southern coast of Monas Island in Chaguaramas, Trinidad and Tobago.
Run Fu 3	Panama	The cargo ship suffered water ingress and capsized in the Indian Ocean approximately 500 nautical miles (930 km) south of the Maldives. The crew were rescued from liferafts by Maple Harbor (Panama).

=== 16 June ===
List of shipwrecks: 16 June 2025
Ship	State	Description
Melita	Croatia	The high speed ferry sank after waves cracked her hull off Zadar. All 38 passengers and five crew were rescued from life rafts by the ferry Jadran and a rescue vessel (both Croatia).

=== 17 June ===
List of shipwrecks: 17 June 2025
Ship	State	Description
Front Eagle, and Adalynn	Liberia; Antigua and Barbuda	The oil tanker Front Eagle with 2,000,000 bbl (84,000,000 US gal; 320,000,000 L) of Iraqi crude oil collided with the empty Suezmax-class oil tanker Adalynn near the Strait of Hormuz in the Gulf of Oman. Twenty-four people from Adalynn were evacuated from one of the oil tankers. No people were injured and no oil was leaked.

=== 21 June ===
List of shipwrecks: 21 June 2025
Ship	State	Description
Over the Moon	United States	A photo of the vessel after being recovered The 28-foot (8.5 m) long Chris-Craft vessel capsized in Lake Tahoe, California, in conditions of strong winds and high waves. Of the ten people aboard, eight died and two were rescued.
Phoenix 15	Comoros	The container ship sank in the Arabian Sea approximately 20 nautical miles (37 km) southeast of Salalah, Oman. All twenty crew were rescued by Gulf Barakah (Marshall Islands).

=== 23 June ===
List of shipwrecks: 23 June 2025
Ship	State	Description
Morning Midas	Liberia	The car carrier, which had caught fire on 3 June, was abandoned in the Pacific Ocean 300 nautical miles (560 km) south of Alaska, United States on 5 June. Her 22 crew were rescued by COSCO Hellas (Malta). She sank on 23 June in the Pacific Ocean some 450 nautical miles (830 km) southwest of Adak Island in 5,000 metres (16,404 ft) of water after being on fire for nearly three weeks.

=== 26 June ===
List of shipwrecks: 26 June 2025
Ship	State	Description
Eco Catania	Italy	The ro-ro cargo vessel allided with the ferry Kydon Palace (Greece) near the port of Igoumenitsa, Greece. No injuries were reported on board both ships.

=== 27 June ===
List of shipwrecks: 26 June 2025
Ship	State	Description
Altay	Marshall Islands	A major fire broke out on board the bulk carrier, while the ship was docked at the port of Hull, East Yorkshire, United Kingdom. No injuries were reported among the ship's crew, and firefighters were trying to extinguish the fire.
Iska 1165	Indonesia	The tug was struck by waves that pushed her ashore and swamped her some 33 nautical miles (61 km) from the Wanci Marina Pier in Lantagi. One crewman drowned.

=== 28 June ===
List of shipwrecks: 28 June 2025
Ship	State	Description
Unnamed	Haiti	A motor boat carrying university students that were celebrating the end of the semester, capsized in conditions of rough weather off the coast of Labadie; there are also reports that the vessel was overloaded. On board there were 27 people, of whom thirteen died, eight were reported missing and six were rescued.

=== 29 June ===
List of shipwrecks: 29 June 2025
Ship	State	Description
Unnamed	United States	A boat was struck by lightning on Logan Martin Lake. The vessel subsequently caught fire and sank. At least four people aboard were injured.
Unnamed	Italy	A fishing vessel with three people on board went missing in the Ionian Sea off the coast of Taranto. The Italian Coast Guard conducted searches for the missing ship.

=== 30 June ===
List of shipwrecks: 30 June 2025
Ship	State	Description
Cala Gullo	Spain	The tug sank in a collision with the container ship MSC Cape Sounio (Malta) at Barcelona. Her crew were rescued from the water by a pilot boat.
San Juan Batista	Philippines	The landing craft transport vessel, which was carrying 2,500 litres (550 imp gal; 660 US gal) of fuel, sank between the islands of Romblon and Sibuyan. All six crew members on board the ship were rescued by a fishing vessel.

=== Unknown date ===
List of shipwrecks: Unknown June 2025
Ship	State	Description
Spirit of Norfolk	United States	The 169-foot (52 m) charter cruise yacht, destroyed by fire in 2022, was sunk by the United States Air Force in the Gulf of Mexico off Destin, Florida in late June 2025 as an artificial reef in 128-foot (39 m) of water.

== July ==
=== 1 July ===
List of shipwrecks: 1 July 2025
Ship	State	Description
Admarine 12	Liberia	The barge/jack up rig capsized in the Gulf of Suez off the coast of Ras Ghareb, Egypt, while being towed towards an oil rigging platform. On board were 31 people, of whom 21 were rescued, four were killed and six were reported missing.
Jackie Lee Anderson	United States Army	The United States Army Corps of Engineers tug capsized in the Ohio River near the Olmsted Locks and Dam in Illinois.
775	United States Army	The United States Army Corps of Engineers tug capsized in the Ohio River near the Olmsted Locks and Dam.

=== 2 July ===
List of shipwrecks: 2 July 2025
Ship	State	Description
KMP Tunu Pratama Jaya	Indonesia	The roll-on/roll-off ferry experienced a flooding in its engine room in the Bali Strait while crossing from Ketapang to Gilimanuk in the evening of 2 July with 65 passengers and crew aboard. By 10 AM on 3 July 31 passengers and crew had been rescued alive, four crew had been found dead, and 30 were still unaccounted for.

=== 5 July ===
List of shipwrecks: 5 July 2025
Ship	State	Description
Unnamed	China	A boat, capable of carrying forty passengers, sank in conditions of strong winds in Dongjiang Lake. Of the 29 people on board, 27 were rescued and two died.

=== 6 July ===
List of shipwrecks: 6 July 2025
Ship	State	Description
Eco Wizard	Marshall Islands	An explosion occurred on board the LPG tanker while unloading cargo at the port of Ust-Luga, Russia, damaging the ship below the waterline and leaking ammonia. The ship's 23 crew members were evacuated.
Fulda	Hong Kong	The chemical tanker suffered an explosion and fire on board off the coast of Kandla, India. After efforts to reduce the vessel's list failed, all 21 crew members were rescued by the tug Orchid Star (India). The Indian Coast Guard dispatched assets to take the vessel in tow.
Gefion	Denmark	The sailing vessel suffered engine failure leaving the port of Rødbyhavn and went aground on the breakwater of Fehmarn Belt. The boat was flooded and partially submerged. The wreck was removed on 15 July.
Magic Seas	Liberia	Gaza War: The bulk carrier was attacked by the Houthi in the Red Sea 51 nautical miles (94 km) southwest of Al Hudaydah, Yemen. The ship was set on fire suffered severe flooding. The crew abandoned the vessel and were rescued by a passing merchant vessel. The ship was scuttled by the Houthis.

=== 7 July ===
List of shipwrecks: 7 July 2025
Ship	State	Description
Galaxy Leader	Bahamas	Gaza war: The vehicle carrier, captured by Houthi rebels in the Red Sea in 2023, was hit in an Israeli air strike in port at Ras Isa, Yemen. Partially sank sometime before 30 April 2026.
Ho Bugt	Denmark	The shrimp trawler ran aground in the North Sea at Houstrup Beach. She was refloated on 9 July.
Iron Horse	Canada	The out-of-service tug sank in the Discovery Passage, at the Campbell River marina, Vancouver Island. A small oil spill occurred.
Kruna Mora	Croatia	The tourist excursion boat was sunk when the ro-ro ferry Petar Hektorović (Croatia) broke loose from her moorings in severe weather and collided with her at Split.

=== 9 July ===
List of shipwrecks: 9 July 2025
Ship	State	Description
Eternity C	Liberia	The bulk carrier sank after being attacked by the Houthi 50 nautical miles (93 km) southwest of Hodeidah, Yemen, with rocket-propelled grenades on 7 July. Two of the 22 crew members on board were killed, and six were rescued.

=== 11 July ===
List of shipwrecks: 10 July 2025
Ship	State	Description
Sea Lady II	Malta	The yacht sank after she caught fire the previous day at Saint-Tropez, Var, France. No fatalities were reported, but two crew members were injured. Efforts to raise the wreck began on 14 July.
Unnamed	United States	A fishing vessel sank off Leadbetter Point, Washington. Of the four people on board, three were rescued by Shearwater (United States), and one died.

=== 12 July ===
List of shipwrecks: 12 July 2025
Ship	State	Description
Unnamed	Flag unknown	A yola, used by migrants to cross the sea from the Dominican Republic to Puerto Rico, capsized in the Caribbean Sea. The boat had about 40 people on board, of whom seventeen were rescued by Dominican authorities, whilst the others were unaccounted for.

=== 14 July ===
List of shipwrecks: 14 July 2025
Ship	State	Description
Pös 602	Portugal	The Frontex patrol vessel struck a rock off Agios Georgios and sank in the Aegean Sea. All six crew were rescued from life rafts.
Unnamed	Indonesia	A ship capsized and sank, while sailing from Sikakap to Tuapejat. All of the eighteen people on board were rescued. Many passengers were government officials.
Volgo Balt 106	Russia	The Project 2-95 cargo ship ran aground at approximately the 288.4 nautical mile mark of the Sheksna River in Vologda Oblast.

=== 16 July ===
List of shipwrecks: 16 July 2025
Ship	State	Description
KM Argo Mulyo	Indonesia	The fishing vessel caught fire in the port of Tegal. No injuries were reported, but the ship was destroyed.
Navigator	United States	The fishing vessel caught fire and sank in Monterey Bay off Pleasure Point near Capitola Beach, California. The vessel was declared a total loss. Both crew members were rescued.

=== 19 July ===
List of shipwrecks: 19 July 2025
Ship	State	Description
Amazon River	Philippines	Tropical Storm Crising: The barge broke loose from her tow, collided with the barge E. E. Margarette (Philippines) and went aground in Balayan Bay near Calaca City, Batangas, Philippines. Her crew were rescued.
E. E. Margarette	Philippines	Tropical Storm Crising: The barge broke loose from her tow, collided with the barge Amazon River (Philippines) and went aground in Balayan Bay near Calaca City. Her hull was holed in the collision and some of her cargo of molasses was lost. Her crew were rescued.
Nguyen Ngoc	Vietnam	Tropical Storm Wipha: The tourist vessel sank in the Boc island area, about 0.5 nautical miles (930 m) from the coast of Thien Cam in thunderstorms and whirlwinds. All 30 passengers and four crew were rescued from the water.
QB-33841-TS	Vietnam	Tropical Storm Wipha: The fishing vessel sank 35 nautical miles (65 km) southeast of Ron Gate (17°53′N 107°04′E) by big waves and strong winds. All seven crew were rescued.
Unnamed	Vietnam	Tropical Storm Wipha: A fishing vessel was sunk by waves while entering the channel at Cam Trung commune Hà Tĩnh province. All three crew were rescued.
Unnamed	Vietnam	Tropical Storm Wipha: A fishing vessel sank at Co Dam commune. Two crew were rescued, one other was reported missing.
Unnamed	Myanmar Navy	A supply ship, part of a flotilla of the Myanmar Navy, was sunk by rebel forces of the People's Defense Force in the Irrawaddy River, near Thabeikkyin Township.
Wonder Sea	Vietnam	The tourist ship capsized due to heavy rains and strong winds in Hạ Long Bay. She was carrying 53 passengers and five crew. Thirteen people were rescued, 38 died.
Yangtze River	Philippines	Tropical Storm Crising: The barge broke loose from her tow and went aground in Balayan Bay near Calaca City. Her crew were rescued.

=== 20 July ===
List of shipwrecks: 20 July 2025
Ship	State	Description
KM Barcelona 5	Indonesia	The ferry carrying 280 passengers and fifteen crewmen heading from the Talaud Islands to Manado caught fire off Talisei Island. At least six people were killed.

=== 22 July ===
List of shipwrecks: 22 July 2025
Ship	State	Description
Endeavor	United States	The concrete-hulled houseboat, a former fishing vessel, sprang a leak as it was being towed to shore for repairs in Snow’s Cove in Rockland, Maine ending up on shore.
Resurgo	Italy	The fishing vessel capsized off the coast of Anzio in conditions of strong winds and high waves. One of the people on board was reported missing.

=== 23 July ===
List of shipwrecks: 23 July 2025
Ship	State	Description
Ingulskyj	Ukraine	The hopper dredger, owned by the Ukrainian Sea Ports Authority, was sunk by a mine, while conducting operations in the Danube Delta near Vylkove, Ukraine. Three of the eleven crew members on board were killed.
Unnamed	Ireland	A fishing vessel sank off the coast of Glengad, Philippines. All three crew members on board were rescued.
Unity World	Philippines	Typhoon Emong: The fishing vessel sank in rough seas in Nasugbu Bay off Fortune Island, Nasugbu, Batangas. All eleven crew members on board evacuated by rafts, and no oil spill was reported.

=== 24 July ===
List of shipwrecks: 24 July 2025
Ship	State	Description
MN Kostas	Sierra Leone	The cargo ship ran aground near Kyriamadi, off the northeastern coast of Crete, Greece. All fourteen crew members on board were evacuated when she started taking on water after grounding.
Orca	Germany	The tug was sunk when a crane collapsed on it in the Wesser River at Bremen. The tug and the crane were raised a few days later.
Unnamed	Myanmar	A sampan sank, in bad weather conditions, while operating as a ferry in the Yangon River. Three of the ten people on board were reported missing.

=== 25 July ===
List of shipwrecks: 25 July 2025
Ship	State	Description
Kepejora	Netherlands	The self-propelled barge, carrying metal scrap, sank in the Sambre River near the Auvelais lock at Sambreville, Belgium.
Miss Jesse	United States	The fishing vessel became disabled and drifted ashore just south of Humboldt Bay near Eureka, California. The vessel was refloated a few days later.
Unnamed	Flag unknown	A migrant boat capsized in the Mediterranean Sea, off the coast of Libya. Of the occupants, ten were rescued, fifteen were killed and others were reported missing.

=== 27 July ===
List of shipwrecks: 27 July 2025
Ship	State	Description
Unnamed	Nigeria	A wooden ferry capsized near Gumu village in the Shiroro area of Niger State, Northern Nigeria. On board there were around 100 people, of whom 25 died, 49 were reported missing and 26 were rescued.

=== 28 July ===
List of shipwrecks: 28 July 2025
Ship	State	Description
CM-05006-TS, and CM-05430-TS	Vietnam	The squid fishing vessels sank in the South China Sea some 2 nautical miles (3.7 km) southeast of Hon Lon Island in a severe thunderstorm. The two fishing vessels were towed to Bai Chet for repairs.

=== 30 July ===
List of shipwrecks: 30 July 2025
Ship	State	Description
Several unnamed vessels	Russia	2025 Kamchatka Peninsula earthquake: Multiple vessels broke loose and were dragged away by a tsunami at the Severo-Kurilsk port.

== August ==
=== 1 August ===
List of shipwrecks: 1 August 2025
Ship	State	Description
Christiane Deymann I	Germany	The self-propelled barge ran aground on the Rhine River near Karlsruhe after suffering rudder failure after a technical fault. Refloated by a passing vessel.
Christiane Deymann II	Germany	The barge ran aground on the Rhine River near Karlsruhe, Germany, after breaking loose from her tow Christiane Deymann I (Germany). She was refloated on 3 August.
Sea Ranger	United States	The tug sank in the Gulf of Alaska some 130 nautical miles (240 km) south of Cordova, Alaska, after springing a leak and suffering a fire in the engine room. Her four crew were rescued by a United States Coast Guard MH-60 Jayhawk helicopter.

=== 3 August ===
List of shipwrecks: 3 August 2025
Ship	State	Description
Ishikawa Maru	Japan	The fishing vessel capsized in the Seto Inland Sea some 18 kilometres (11 mi) southeast of the southern tip of Cape Motoyama near Onoda City in a hit and run incident. One of the two people on board died, while the other was rescued.
Unnamed	Ethiopia	A boat carrying at least 157 Ethiopian migrants sank off the coast of Abyan Governorate, Yemen. Ninety-six people were confirmed dead, 32 survived and 29 were reported missing, with a search ongoing. All of the missing people have been presumed dead.

=== 4 August ===
List of shipwrecks: 4 August 2025
Ship	State	Description
Unnamed	India	A fishing vessel capsized after losing stability due to strong waves in the Arabian Sea off Kapu after departing from Malpe. Nearby fishermen rescued the crew of seven without injury.

=== 5 August ===
List of shipwrecks: 5 August 2025
Ship	State	Description
Bali Dolphin Cruise II	Indonesia	The passenger ferry ran aground, capsized, and sank in the Bali Sea at the entrance of Sanur, Bali, after encountering large waves. On board there were 80 people, of whom two died and one was reported missing.

=== 7 August ===
List of shipwrecks: 7 August 2025
Ship	State	Description
LCT Golden Phoenix	Philippines	The Landing craft tank ran aground with a heavy list to port in rough weather in San Miguel Bay, Luzon.
Unnamed	United States	A helicopter crashed into a barge on the Mississippi River, starting a fire. Both occupants of the helicopter were killed, but no injuries were reported on the barge.

=== 8 August ===
List of shipwrecks: 8 August 2025
Ship	State	Description
Kapitan Ushakov	Russia	The Project 23470 icebreaking tug capsized and sank at Saint Petersburg due to flooding while fitting out. Salvage began June 23-5 2026.

=== 9 August ===
List of shipwrecks: 9 August 2025
Ship	State	Description
Discovery	United States	The passenger vessel ran aground near Honolulu's Kewalo Basin Harbor.

=== 10 August ===
List of shipwrecks: 10 August 2025
Ship	State	Description
Das Bug	United States	The crab fishing boat capsized approximately 2 nautical miles (3.7 km) off the Yaquina Bay Jetty near Newport, Oregon in seven-foot (2.1 m) swells. Three of the four crew members on board were rescued by the United States Coast Guard, one was reported missing.
Raffaele Rubattino	Italy	The ferry caught fire in the Gulf of Naples, while en route from Palermo to Naples. The fire was extinguished and all 155 on board were safe, but the vessel was left adrift.

=== 11 August ===
List of shipwrecks: 11 August 2025
Ship	State	Description
Da Vinci	Italy	The motor yacht caught fire and sank off Formentera, Spain. All fourteen people on board were rescued.

=== 13 August ===
List of shipwrecks: 13 August 2025
Ship	State	Description
Unnamed	Flag unknown	A boat carrying 97 migrants capsized in the Mediterranean Sea off the island of Lampedusa, Italy. Twenty people were confirmed dead, 60 were rescued and between twelve and seventeen were reported missing, with search efforts ongoing.
Unnamed	Flag unknown	A yacht was sunk in a collision with Sada Maru No.38 (Japan) in Tsukumi Bay, Kyushu, Japan in conditions of low visibility. One person was killed.

=== 14 August ===
List of shipwrecks: 14 August 2025
Ship	State	Description
BD98470TS	Vietnam	The tuna fishing vessel ran aground and partially sank after striking a reef in the South China Sea near Xom Cat. Authorities dewatered the fishing vessel and pulled the vessel off the reef. Her five crew were rescued without injury.
Port Olya-4	Russia	Russian invasion of Ukraine: The cargo ship was struck by four Ukrainian drones and sank in shallow waters in the Caspian Sea at Olya.

=== 15 August ===
List of shipwrecks: 15 August 2025
Ship	State	Description
Nekton Rorqual	United States	The scuba diving vessel was scuttled as an artificial reef south of Destin, Florida.

=== 17 August ===
List of shipwrecks: 17 August 2025
Ship	State	Description
Atlantic Treasure	Canada	The fishing vessel suffered a broken pipe that caused her to sink on the Grand Banks of Newfoundland. Her crew were rescued from their life raft by Maid of Amsterdam (Canada).
Ciudad de Medellín	Ghana	The tug struck one of the piers of the Guillermo Gaviria Bridge in the Magdalena River at Barrancabermeja, Colombia, causing her to list over on her starboard side, partially sinking in shallow water.
KG 40xx TS	Vietnam	The transport ship sank at anchor about 300 metres (330 yd) from the shore in the Kien Hai Special Zone, Bai Gieng area, Thien Tue hamlet by high waves. She was later refloated.
Unnamed	Nigeria	A boat heading to Goronyo market, Sokoto State, Nigeria, capsized en route. On board there were 51 people, of whom at least three died, 26 were rescued and 22 were reported missing. Rescue operations were ended on 20 August, with the 22 missing people presumed dead.

=== 19 August ===
List of shipwrecks: 19 August 2025
Ship	State	Description
Joy George	Ghana	The fishing vessel struck some submerged rocks and partially sank in the Gulf of Guinea just outside Elmina Castle. She was later recovered and towed to the safety of the breakwater off Elmina Castle.
Mañón Un	Spain	The fishing vessel sprang a leak and sank at the entrance of the Cedeira estuary near Cedeira. Her crew were rescued by LS Percebiño (Spain).

=== 20 August ===
List of shipwrecks: 20 August 2025
Ship	State	Description
Unnamed	Russian Navy	Russian invasion of Ukraine: A patrol boat was destroyed by a Ukrainian drone-guided laser in the Black Sea near Zaliznyi Port, Kherson Oblast, Ukraine. Five crew members were killed.

=== 21 August ===
List of shipwrecks: 21 August 2025
Ship	State	Description
Locar LH XXIV	Brazil	The tug ran aground in the South Atlantic off Maria da Rosa. She was refloated on 24 August.

=== 22 August ===
List of shipwrecks: 22 August 2025
Ship	State	Description
GIS Patriot	Haiti	The cargo vessel carrying several tons of goods, including rice, capsized in the Tortuga Canal between Tortuga and Port-de-Paix. All six passengers and ten crew were rescued.

=== 26 August ===
List of shipwrecks: 26 August 2025
Ship	State	Description
Thanh Thanh Dat 99	Vietnam	Typhoon Kajiki: The cargo vessel dragged her anchor in the storm and went aground 70 metres (230 ft) off Binh village, Thanh Hóa province, Vietnam. All nineteen crew were rescued.
Unnamed	The Gambia	A migrant boat carrying 160 people capsized during a sudden shift of movement from a crowd off the coast of Mheijrat, Mauritania. Seventy people were killed, seventeen were rescued and 73 were reported missing with search and rescue operations ongoing.

=== 28 August ===
List of shipwrecks: 28 August 2025
Ship	State	Description
Simferopol	Ukrainian Navy	Russian invasion of Ukraine: The Laguna-class intelligence ship was sunk by a Russian naval drone in the Danube River delta. Two of her crew were killed.

=== 29 August ===
List of shipwrecks: 29 August 2025
Ship	State	Description
A. Fervenza	Spain	The fishing vessel sprang a leak, capsizing and sinking in the Atlantic Ocean off Cape Vilán. Both crew members were rescued by Zues (Spain).
Nuevo Salmón	Spain	The fishing vessel sprang a leak on 28 August and sank the next day in the Atlantic Ocean 150 miles (240 km) from the Azores. Her eleven crew rescued by the reefer CS Standard (Singapore).

=== 30 August ===
List of shipwrecks: 30 August 2025
Ship	State	Description
Unnamed	United States	A pontoon boat carrying seven people capsized in Flagstaff Lake, Maine, United States. Two women were killed and another person was critically injured.

== September ==
=== 1 September ===
List of shipwrecks: 1 September 2025
Ship	State	Description
Awadi	Spain	The fishing vessel was gutted by fire while berthed on the Ría de Arousa in Ribeira. The two crew members were safely evacuated.
Sea Ern	United States	The fishing vessel ran aground in the Gulf of Alaska off Afognak Island, Alaska.

=== 2 September ===
List of shipwrecks: 2 September 2025
Ship	State	Description
Dolce Vento	Turkey	The luxury motor yacht capsized immediately after being launched in Zonguldak Zonguldak District, Turkey. The owner, captain, and two crew members escaped unharmed.
Unnamed	Nigeria	A boat carrying over 100 passengers struck a submerged tree stump and capsized near the Gausawa Community in Borgu. Sixty people were killed, ten others were rescued in critical condition and the rest were reported missing. Search and rescue operations are ongoing.
Unnamed	Venezuela	2025 United States military strikes against alleged drug traffickers: An alleged drug-smuggling vessel operated by the Tren de Aragua, designated a narco-terrorist organization, was destroyed in the Southern Caribbean by American forces. Eleven people were killed.
Two unnamed vessels	Algeria	Two migrant boats sank on the Los Muertos beach in Carboneras, Andalusia and Las Salinas beach in Cabo de Gata, Spain. Seven people were killed and 63 others were rescued.

=== 3 September ===
List of shipwrecks: 3 September 2025
Ship	State	Description
Jade	Netherlands	The container ship ran aground in the Ghent–Terneuzen Canal near Sas van Gent, Zeeland. No injuries were reported.
Unnamed	Canada	A boat capsized and sank in Okanagan Lake near Ellison Provincial Park in British Columbia, Canada. The occupants escaped.

=== 5 September ===
List of shipwrecks: 5 September 2025
Ship	State	Description
Unnamed	Ivory Coast	A narrow canoe-like boat was capsized by a hippopotamus on the Sassandra River near Buyo, Ivory Coast. Eleven people were reported missing, including children and an infant, and three others were rescued.

=== 6 September ===
List of shipwrecks: 6 September 2025
Ship	State	Description
Rescue 1122	Pakistan	The rescue boat hit a tree and capsized in the Chenab River while evacuating people from flooding in the Jalalpur Pirwala area of Multan, Punjab, Pakistan. Five people were killed.
Thamesborg	Netherlands	The cargo ship, transporting industrial carbon blocks, ran aground in the Franklin Strait off Prince of Wales Island in the Northwest Passage. The ship remained aground until tugs arrived on 6 October to salvage the ship.
Unnamed	United States	A boat exploded shortly after leaving a fueling dock at a Lake St. Clair marina in St. Clair Shores, Michigan. Two people suffered minor injuries, a dog died and the dock was damaged.

=== 7 September ===
List of shipwrecks: 7 September 2025
Ship	State	Description
Cairdeas	United States	The yacht sank in Sinclair Inlet near Bremerton, Washington. She was refloated on 24 September.
Unnamed	Flag unknown	A fishing vessel caught fire in the Malacca Strait off Pantai Remis, Malaysia. The fire was extinguished after gutting and sinking the vessel. All 25 crew were rescued without injury.
Unnamed	Turkey	A high-speed boat carrying 34 migrants and a smuggler struck a Turkish Coast Guard vessel off the coast of Badavut, Ayvalık. Five people were killed, one person was seriously injured and another was reported missing.

=== 9 September ===
List of shipwrecks: 9 September 2025
Ship	State	Description
TB. PSIP 160.5	Indonesia	The tug ran aground striking a coral formation along her starboard hull holding the vessel in the engine room and taking on water in the Banda Sea off Bahodopi. Tug TB. Enterprise 3 (Indonesia) took off her crew and then ran her aground in shallow water, sinking partially submerged.

=== 10 September ===
List of shipwrecks: 10 September 2025
Ship	State	Description
Two unnamed vessels	United States	A hopper barge loaded with sand capsized and partially sank along with a dredger in the Ohio River at Mile Marker 45 near Newell, West Virginia.
Unnamed	Morocco	A tuna fishing vessel ran aground and caught fire in the Atlantic Ocean off Lanzarote, Canary Islands. All five crew were rescued with two being taken to hospital and treated for hypothermia.
Unnamed	Democratic Republic of the Congo	A motorised passenger boat capsized in Basankusu Territory, Équateur Province. Eighty-six people were killed and several others were reported missing.
William Price	United States	The dredger capsized and partially sank in the Ohio River at Mile Marker 45 near Newell, West Virginia.

=== 11 September ===
List of shipwrecks: 11 September 2025
Ship	State	Description
Unnamed	Democratic Republic of the Congo	A whale-boat with nearly 500 passengers caught fire and capsized on the Congo River at Lukolela. 107 people were killed, 209 others were rescued and 146 were reported missing.

=== 12 September ===
List of shipwrecks: 12 September 2025
Ship	State	Description
Tafra 3	Mauritania	The fishing vessel was sunk in a collision with the fishing vessel Right Whale (Gambia) in the Atlantic Ocean off the coast of Mauritania in 50 metres (160 ft) of water. Five crewmen were reported missing and 21 others were rescued.

=== 15 September ===
List of shipwrecks: 15 September 2025
Ship	State	Description
Unnamed	Venezuela	2025 United States military strikes on alleged drug traffickers: An alleged drug vessel was destroyed in a strike by American forces in international waters. Three people were killed.

=== 17 September ===
List of shipwrecks: 17 September 2025
Ship	State	Description
Dominion	United States	The Design 293-A class tug, sank at dock in Bremerton, Washington.

=== 18 September ===
List of shipwrecks: 18 September 2025
Ship	State	Description
CM 995xx TS	Vietnam	The fishing vessel was sunk 5 nautical miles (9.3 km) off An Thoi archipelago Vietnam by a tornado in thunderstorms, wind, and waves of level 6. Her crew were rescued.

=== 19 September ===
List of shipwrecks: 19 September 2025
Ship	State	Description
Unnamed	South Korea	A fishing vessel capsized and sank in the Sea of Japan some 33.3 nautical miles (61.6 km) east of Busan. Seven crew were rescued by other fishing vessels, another was reported missing and the captain died of cardiac arrest.
Unnamed	Venezuela	2025 United States military strikes on alleged drug traffickers: An alleged drug vessel was destroyed in a strike by American forces in international waters. people were killed.

=== 22 September ===
List of shipwrecks: 22 September 2025
Ship	State	Description
Jobhenz	Philippines	A photo of Jobhenz after it capsized Typhoon Ragasa: The fishing vessel capsized after being torn away from its mooring by strong waves while being docked in Santa Ana, Cagayan, Cagayan Valley, Philippines. Seven people were killed and six others were rescued.
Unnamed	Netherlands	The barge Spes-Vera (Netherlands) en route from Groningen to Lelystad collided with a yacht near the Fonejachtbrug on the Prinses Margriet Canal near Warten, Friesland. The yacht capsized. The fire brigade rescued two people out of the water who were brought to the hospital.

=== 26 September ===
List of shipwrecks: 26 September 2025
Ship	State	Description
Big Glory	Philippines	Typhoon Opong: The non-self propelled barge dragged anchor and went aground off Barangay Poblacion.
Big Joy	Philippines	Typhoon Opong: The non-self propelled barge went aground off Barangay Poblacion.
Julienne	Philippines	Typhoon Opong: The barge's mooring lines parted and went aground off Barangay Poblacion.
June Aster	Philippines	Typhoon Opong: The passenger/cargo ship went aground approximately 30 metres (98 ft) from the shoreline of Barangay Poblacion.
Solid Harmony	Philippines	Typhoon Opong: The ro-ro cargo ship dragged anchor and went aground off Barangay Cabolutan.

=== 27 September ===
List of shipwrecks: 27 September 2025
Ship	State	Description
Jishon 2	Taiwan	Typhoon Opong: The fishing vessel ran aground approximately 10 metres (33 ft) from the shoreline of Sitio Pamustusin, the Philippines, after her anchor line fouled her prop.

=== 28 September ===
List of shipwrecks: 28 September 2025
Ship	State	Description
BV-92754-TS, and BV-92756-TS	Vietnam	Typhoon No. 10: The fishing vessels dragged their anchors in Xuan Loc neighborhood, Bac Gianh. One boat sank. The other went aground on a breakwater at the mouth of the Cửa Việt channel. Between the two boats there were eight survivors and three other crew reported missing.
USS Simpson	United States Navy	The decommissioned Oliver Hazard Perry-class guided-missile frigate was sunk as a target in the Atlantic Ocean, approximately 200 nautical miles (370 km) east of Cape Hatteras, North Carolina, during the naval exercise UNITAS LXVI.

=== 29 September ===
List of shipwrecks: 29 September 2025
Ship	State	Description
Minervagracht	Netherlands	The cargo ship was attacked in the Red Sea by Houthi rebels. She was severely damaged and set afire. One person was killed, another was injured and the remaining fourteen crew were rescued by a vessel operating under Operation Aspides.
NS Sea Dagger	Norway	The former pilot boat sank in the North Sea 70 miles (110 km) west of Sylt, Germany. Her crew were rescued.

=== 30 September ===
List of shipwrecks: 30 September 2025
Ship	State	Description
Unnamed	Nigeria	A boat carrying passengers, mostly traders heading to a market in Edo State, suffered an accident on the Niger River in the Abaji area. The cause of the accident was not immediately known. At least 26 people were killed.

=== Unknown date ===
List of shipwrecks: Unknown September 2025
Ship	State	Description
HNoMS Bergen	Royal Norwegian Navy	Exercise Ægir 25: The decommissioned Oslo-class frigate was bombed and sunk by a United States Air Force Northrop B-2 Spirit aircraft using a Joint Direct Attack Munition in 125 metres (410 ft) of water off Ryllefjord.
HNoMS Trondheim	Royal Norwegian Navy	Exercise Ægir 25: The decommissioned Oslo-class frigate was struck by Naval Strike Missiles launched from HMS Somerset (Royal Navy) and HNoMS Thor Heyerdahl (Royal Norwegian Navy) and then torpedoed and sunk by HNoMS Uthaug 2,200 metres (7,200 ft) off Senja.

== October ==
=== 1 October ===
List of shipwrecks: 1 October 2025
Ship	State	Description
Unnamed	South Korea	A fishing vessel was sunk in a collision with another fishing vessel in Gwangyang Bay near Myodo Island.

=== 3 October ===
List of shipwrecks: 1 October 2025
Ship	State	Description
Unnamed	Venezuela	2025 United States military strikes against alleged drug traffickers: The United States armed forces conducted a strike that sunk an alleged drug vessel off the Venezuelan coast. Four people were killed.

=== 4 October ===
List of shipwrecks: 4 October 2025
Ship	State	Description
BD 83019-TS	Vietnam	The fishing vessel was sunk in a collision with the tanker Favor (South Korea) in the South China Sea some 16 nautical miles (30 km) off the Ca Na estuary in 60-metre (200 ft) of water. Her captain was killed, the rest of her crew were rescued by other fishing boats.
Unnamed	Spain	A tourist motor boat exploded and sank while leaving a marina in Fuengirola. Eight people were injured, including three seriously.

=== 6 October ===
List of shipwrecks: 6 October 2025
Ship	State	Description
Unnamed	Serbia	A migrant boat carrying at least ten Chinese nationals capsized on the Danube river in the area of Bačka Palanka while en route to Croatia. One person was killed and nine others were rescued.

=== 7 October ===
List of shipwrecks: 7 October 2025
Ship	State	Description
TTH 96329-TS	Vietnam	The fishing vessel was sunk in a collision with the cargo ship Thuan Trung 08 (Vietnam) in the South China Sea 10 nautical miles (19 km) north north west of the Thuận An estuary in winds at force 4-5 on the Beaufort scale. Three crew were rescued, one was reported missing.
Unnamed	Greece	A migrant boat carrying 38 people sank off the coast of Lesbos. Four people were killed, and 34 others were rescued.
Weesam Express 8	Philippines	The passenger ferry sprang a leak, listed to starboard and sank partially submerged in the Sulu Sea at Zamboanga.

=== 9 October ===
List of shipwrecks: 9 October 2025
Ship	State	Description
Elmes	Saint Kitts and Nevis	The roll-on/roll-off cargo vessel capsized while undergoing repairs at the Yıldız shipyard in Turkey. Two workers were killed and several others were injured.

=== 10 October ===
List of shipwrecks: 10 October 2025
Ship	State	Description
El Atracadero	Mexico	The floating seafood restaurant was swept away from its moorings on the Tuxpan River at Tuxpan from the heavy rains from Hurricane Priscilla and Tropical Storm Raymond. It drifted down the river and eventually made its way into the Gulf of Mexico. One section that contained the kitchen and bathroom was found near the port of Alvarado, Mexico some 110 nautical miles (200 km) away from Tuxpan. The other section containing the dining room was spotted 0.54 nautical miles (1 km) offshore of Coatzacoalcos, Mexico. The dining room had travelled some 310 nautical miles (570 km) before it eventually beached at Playa El Tesoro.
Marigalante	Mexico	The replica of the galleon Santa María sprang a leak and sank off Puerto Vallarta, Mexico.

=== 11 October ===
List of shipwrecks: 10 October 2025
Ship	State	Description
Unnamed	Ghana	A boat capsized in Lake Volta, while travelling between Okuma and Bovime. Fifteen people were killed.

=== 12 October ===
List of shipwrecks: 12 October 2025
Ship	State	Description
Eileen	Cameroon	The cargo ship sprang a leak and sank in the Black Sea 140 nautical miles (260 km) east of Varna, Bulgaria. Her crew were rescued from liferafts by Murat Ilhan (Turkey).
Unnamed	South Korea	The fishing vessel caught fire in the East China Sea some 18 nautical miles (34 km) southeast of Marado. Her 27 crew were rescued by a nearby vessel, with six sustaining injuries.

=== 13 October ===
List of shipwrecks: 13 October 2025
Ship	State	Description
Unnamed	Taiwan	The fishing vessel was gutted by fire in the Taiwan Strait off Jibei Island. Nobody was on board at the time of the fire.

=== 14 October ===
List of shipwrecks: 14 October 2025
Ship	State	Description
Silver Cloud	United Kingdom	The fishing trawler ran aground on rocks at the entrance to Loch Inver and sank partially submerged. Lifeboats rescued the crew from the rocks.
Unnamed	Venezuela	2025 United States military strikes against alleged drug traffickers: A speedboat was blown up by American forces near the Venezuelan coast. Six people were killed.

=== 15 October ===
List of shipwrecks: 15 October 2025
Ship	State	Description
Falls of Clyde	United States	The sailing ship was scuttled 25 nautical miles (46 km) south of Honolulu, Hawaii in 12,500 feet (3,800 m) of water.
Federal II	Indonesia	The crude palm oil tanker exploded and caught fire at a shipyard in Batam. Ten people were killed and 21 others were injured.
Mitra Kencana X	Indonesia	The tug capsized and sank in the Musi River at Palembang. Her towline to the barge Sumber Kencana (Indonesia) tightened in a strong river current causing the tug to be pulled over.
Nekton Pilot	United States	The scuba diving vessel was scuttled in the Gulf of Mexico as an artificial reef south of Destin, Florida (30°04′N 86°18′W) in 130 feet (40 m) of water.

=== 16 October ===
List of shipwrecks: 16 October 2025
Ship	State	Description
Hagland Captain	Norway	The cargo ship en route from Halden to Porsgrunn ran aground on the Iddefjord near the Svinesund Bridge along the Swedish coastline.
Noruego	Angola	The fishing vessel caught fire in the South Atlantic off the coast of Angola. She burned to the waterline and sank.
Unnamed	Venezuela	2025 United States military strikes against alleged drug traffickers: An alleged narco-submarine was blown up by American forces in the Caribbean Sea. Two people were killed and two others survived.
Unnamed	Mozambique	A ship capsized while traveling between the port and the anchorage area during a routine crew management operation in Beira. Three people were killed, fourteen others were rescued and four were reported missing.

=== 17 October ===
List of shipwrecks: 17 October 2025
Ship	State	Description
Unnamed	Colombia	2025 United States strikes on Venezuelan boats: An alleged National Liberation Army drug vessel was blown up by military forces of the United States. Three people were killed.
Unnamed	Mozambique	A fishing vessel struck a rock and ran aground in the Mozambique Channel along the beach between the towns of Massavana and Ligogo. Her sixteen crew members were rescued.

=== 18 October ===
List of shipwrecks: 16 October 2025
Ship	State	Description
Falcon	Cameroon	The liquefied petroleum gas tanker en route from Sohar to Djibouti was set on fire in the Gulf of Aden east of Aden, Yemen. Two people were killed and 24 others were rescued. The U.S. Navy-overseen Joint Maritime Information Center said it appeared to be an accident while the United Kingdom Maritime Trade Operations initially said it had been struck by an unknown projectile.
Unnamed	United States	The cabin cruiser capsized and sank in Oregon Inlet, North Carolina. One of her two crew died.
Unnamed	Canada	A boat capsized on Lake Rossignol near West Caledonia in Nova Scotia, Canada. Two children died and two others were rescued with injuries.

=== 21 October ===
List of shipwrecks: 21 October 2025
Ship	State	Description
Unnamed	Flag unknown	2025 United States military strikes against alleged drug traffickers: An alleged drug vessel was destroyed by the United States Department of War on the Pacific Ocean off the West Coast of Central America. Two people were killed.

=== 22 October ===
List of shipwrecks: 22 October 2025
Ship	State	Description
Radoche Tercero	Spain	The fishing vessel sprang a leak in the Irish Sea 55 nautical miles (102 km) southwest of Castletown, Ireland. The fishing vessel Puenteareas Uno (France) rescued her twelve crew. Radoche Tercero later sank.
Unnamed boat	Flag unknown	A boat carrying migrants to Europe sank off the coast of Mahdia Tunisia. forty people were killed and 30 others were rescued.
Unnamed	Flag unknown	2025 United States military strikes against alleged drug traffickers: An alleged drug vessel was destroyed by the United States Department of War in the Pacific Ocean off the West Coast of Central America. Three people were killed.

=== 24 October ===
List of shipwrecks: 24 October 2025
Ship	State	Description
Royal Evolution	Egypt	The live aboard dive vessel ran aground on the Adu Dabab Four Reef in the Red Sea. She was refloated on 27 October.
Unnamed	Flag unknown	A rubber migrant boat heading for Europe took on water and sank shortly after departure off the coast of Bodrum, Turkey. Fourteen people were killed, two were rescued and two were reported missing.
Unnamed vessel	Venezuela	2025 United States military strikes against alleged drug traffickers: An alleged Tren de Aragua drug vessel was struck in the Caribbean Sea. Six people were killed.

=== 25 October ===
List of shipwrecks: 25 October 2025
Ship	State	Description
Haili 5	China	The bulk carrier was sunk in a collision with the container ship Wan Hai A17 (Singapore) in Lingding Channel, Pearl River Estuary. Thirteen crew were rescued and two others were reported missing.
Monitor II	United States	The retired ferry was disposed of by burning at the "35th annual boat burning" by the Long Island Maritime Museum, West Sayville, New York.

=== 26 October ===
List of shipwrecks: 26 October 2025
Ship	State	Description
Star Bueno	Liberia	The bulk carrier dragged her anchor in strong waves and rough seas causing her to go aground off Quảng Ngãi province, Vietnam. She was refloated on 29 October.

=== 27 October ===
List of shipwrecks: 27 October 2025
Ship	State	Description
Two unnamed vessels	Flags unknown	2025 United States military strikes on alleged drug traffickers: Two alleged drug vessels were destroyed in a strike by American forces in the eastern Pacific Ocean. Eight people were killed.
Unnamed	Unknown	2025 United States military strikes on alleged drug traffickers: An alleged drug vessel was destroyed in a strike by American forces in the eastern Pacific Ocean. Four people were killed.
Unnamed	Unknown	2025 United States military strikes on alleged drug traffickers: An alleged drug vessel was destroyed in a strike by American forces in the eastern Pacific Ocean. Two people were killed and another was rescued.

=== 28 October ===
List of shipwrecks: 28 October 2025
Ship	State	Description
Unnamed	Libya	A wooden vessel carrying dozens of irregular refugees capsized in high waves off the coast of Surman. Eighteen people were killed and 64 others were rescued.

=== 29 October ===
List of shipwrecks: 29 October 2025
Ship	State	Description
Unnamed	Flag unknown	2025 United States military strikes on alleged drug traffickers: An alleged drug vessel was destroyed in a strike by American forces in the eastern Pacific Ocean. Four people were killed.

=== 30 October ===
List of shipwrecks: 30 October 2025
Ship	State	Description
B 0237, and B 7020	United States	Hurricane Melissa: The two hopper barges broke loose from their moorings in Long Island Sound drifting on to Woodmont, Connecticut and drifted on the tide to West Haven, Connecticut the next day. They were refloated on 2 November.
Carrabassett	United States	The 25-metre (82 ft) fishing vessel was destroyed by fire at Fairhaven, Massachusetts. No injuries were reported.

== November ==
=== 1 November ===
List of shipwrecks: 1 November 2025
Ship	State	Description
BV-92437 TS, and TG-90738 TS	Vietnam	The moored fishing vessels were run down and sunk by Sea Noble (Panama) 8.1 nautical miles (15 km) southeast of Vũng Tàu. Their crews were rescued by other fishing vessels.
Unnamed	Flag unknown	A migrant boat sank off the coast of Tobruk, Cyrenaica, Libya. Forty-five people were rescued.
Unnamed	Flag unknown	2025 United States military strikes on alleged drug traffickers: An alleged drug vessel was destroyed in a strike by the United States Military in the Caribbean Sea. Three people were killed.

=== 2 November ===
List of shipwrecks: 2 November 2025
Ship	State	Description
CM-05144-TS	Vietnam	The fishing vessel was sunk by large waves and strong winds about 2 nautical miles (3.7 km) southwest of Kinh Hoi estuary.

=== 3 November ===
List of shipwrecks: 3 November 2025
Ship	State	Description
Unnamed	flag unknown	A migrant boat had an engine failure in high waves, causing it to capsize near the al-Buri Oil Field in Libya. Seven people were rescued and 42 others were presumed dead.

=== 4 November ===
List of shipwrecks: 4 November 2025
Ship	State	Description
Unnamed	Flag unknown	2025 United States military strikes on alleged drug traffickers: An alleged drug vessel was destroyed in a strike by American forces in the eastern Pacific Ocean. Two people were killed.

=== 5 November ===
List of shipwrecks: 5 November 2025
Ship	State	Description
Yu Shan No.36	Taiwan	The fishing vessel capsized 14 nautical miles (26 km) off Cape Fugui. Her skipper was killed, eight others were rescued and one was reported missing.

=== 6 November ===
List of shipwrecks: 6 November 2025
Ship	State	Description
Lih Fa No.168	Taiwan	The fishing vessel capsized some 35 nautical miles (65 km) off the Port of Keelung. Three people were rescued, and three others were reported missing.
Unnamed	Flag unknown	2025 United States military strikes on alleged drug traffickers: An alleged drug vessel was destroyed in a strike by American forces in the Caribbean Sea. Three people were killed.

=== 8 November ===
List of shipwrecks: 8 November 2025
Ship	State	Description
BTh-81196-TS, BTh-85885-TS, and BTh-86131-TS	Vietnam	Typhoon Kalmaegi: The fishing vessels capsized and sank in heavy swells on the Song Dinh River. BTh-81196-TS completely sank. The two other boats were partially sunk resting on their starboard side.

=== 9 November ===
List of shipwrecks: 9 November 2025
Ship	State	Description
Boca de Yuma I	Dominican Republic	The catamaran sank after hitting an unknown object in Samana Bay. Fifty-five passengers, plus crew, were rescued from the water.
Felicity 8	Belize	Typhoon Uwan: The cargo ship ran aground off Barangay Wawa Ibaba, Philippines, driven ashore by rough sea conditions.
Unnamed	Myanmar	A migrant boat sank off the Malaysia–Thailand border. Seven people were killed, thirteen others were rescued and 280 were reported missing.
Unknown	Flag unknown	A fishing vessel was sunk in a collision with an unknown cargo ship approximately 3.5 nautical miles (6.5 km) east of Chengshantou, China.

=== 10 November ===
List of shipwrecks: 10 November 2025
Ship	State	Description
Unknown	Indonesia	A ferry sank on the Mahakam River near Ujoh Halang. Twenty passengers were rescued, eight others died.

=== 11 November ===
List of shipwrecks: 11 November 2025
Ship	State	Description
BTh 80088 TS	Vietnam	The fishing vessel sank while attempting to enter port by large waves and strong winds at La Gi.
BTh 80316 TS	Vietnam	The fishing vessel sank while at anchor in harsh weather, large waves and strong winds at or in the area of village 14, Lien Huong commune.
BTh 80347 TS	Vietnam	The fishing vessel dragged anchor and sent ashore in harsh weather, large waves and strong winds at or in the area of village 14. She was placed under repair.
BTh 81652 TS	Vietnam	The fishing vessel capsized and sank while at anchor in harsh weather, large waves and strong winds at or in the area of village 14.
BTh 82176 TS	Vietnam	The fishing vessel sank while attempting to enter port by large waves and strong winds at Lien Huonge. She was later salvaged.
BTh 85974 TS	Vietnam	The fishing vessel sank while attempting to enter port by large waves and strong winds at La Gi
TH-90073-TS	Vietnam	The fishing vessel sank in the sea about 3 nautical miles (5.6 km) east of Hon La Port (17°54′N 106°34′E). All seven crew were rescued.
Unnamed	China	A fishing vessel capsized in the Yellow Sea approximately 81 nautical miles (150 km) southwest of Gageodo Island, South Korea.
Unnamed	Flag unknown	A fishing vessel capsized in the Yellow Sea approximately 23 nautical miles (43 km) southwest of Soyeonpyeong Island, South Korea. Two people were rescued, but one died later. Three others were reported missing.

=== 14 November ===
List of shipwrecks: 14 November 2025
Ship	State	Description
Unnamed	South Korea	A fishing vessel caught fire and sank in the Yellow Sea off the coast of Boryeong. All 21 crew were rescued by other fishing vessels.

=== 15 November ===
List of shipwrecks: 15 November 2025
Ship	State	Description
Unnamed	Mexico	A panga boat carrying migrants capsized in rough waves off the coast of San Diego, California, United States. Four people were killed and five others were rescued.

=== 16 November ===
List of shipwrecks: 16 November 2025
Ship	State	Description
HY 0459	Vietnam	The cargo ship suffered a steering failure and drifted ashore in heavy waves in Duc Pho Ward, Quảng Ngãi province.
LA 99034 TS	Vietnam	The fishing vessel sank approximately 6 nautical miles (11 km) off Ben Dam Bay in the Côn Đảo archipelago. Her crew were rescued by BV 95738 TS, which rescued four of the crew, and TG 92308 TS (both Vietnam) rescued the other crew member.

=== 17 November ===
List of shipwrecks: 17 November 2025
Ship	State	Description
Alborada I	Argentina	The fishing vessel sank in port at Caleta Olivia in a severe storm with heavy swells and wind gusts reaching 75 miles per hour (120 km/h).
Barracuda	Argentina	The fishing vessel sank in port at Caleta Olivia in a severe storm with heavy swells and wind gusts reaching 75 miles per hour (120 km/h).
Yakisa	Argentina	The fishing vessel sank in port at Caleta Olivia, Argentina, in a severe storm with heavy swells and wind gusts reaching 75 miles per hour (120 km/h).

=== 18 November ===
List of shipwrecks: 18 November 2025
Ship	State	Description
Unknown	Canada	A cargo barge suffered damage and partially sank near Bella Bella, British Columbia while en route to Seattle, Washington, United States.

=== 24 November ===
List of shipwrecks: 24 November 2025
Ship	State	Description
CM-05967-TS	Vietnam	The fishing vessel sank in the Gulf of Thailand. Her four crew were rescued the next morning in the Bai Ngu/Tho Chau area.
Hai 4	Germany	The fishing vessel sank at dock in the Ems-Jade Canal near the Wiesbadenbrücke in Wilhelmshaven.
Unknown	Flag unknown	A fishing vessel was holed, causing flooding and she capsized in the Yellow Sea near Wangdeungdo Island, Buan-gun, South Korea. All ten crew were rescued by the South Korean Coast Guard.
Unnamed	United States	The catamaran after capsizing A catamaran capsized off the coast of Clearwater, Florida. The four people on board were stranded for approximately 20 hours before being rescued by the United States Coast Guard.

=== 27 November ===
List of shipwrecks: 1 November 2025
Ship	State	Description
Unknown	Vietnam	A fishing vessel sank in the South China Sea near the mouth of the Hàm Luông River off Bến Tre in large waves and strong winds.
Unnamed	Democratic Republic of the Congo	A passenger boat travelling from Kiri to Kinshasa capsized on Lake Mai-Ndombe between the villages of Bobeni and Lobeke. At least twenty people were killed and several others were reported missing.

=== 28 November ===
List of shipwrecks: 28 November 2025
Ship	State	Description
NT 90329 TS	Vietnam	The fishing vessel sank in the South China Sea 300 metres (330 yd) off Binh Tien in large waves and strong winds. Two crew swam to shore, one other died, and two were reported missing.
Unnamed	Thailand	Cyclone Senyar: A rescue boat sank in seconds while carrying out relief efforts due to the wake of a passing vessel on a flooded canal in Songkhla. Her crew escaped safely.

== December ==
=== 3 December ===
List of shipwrecks: 3 December 2025
Ship	State	Description
Hua De 858	China	The cargo ship ran aground on a shoal in Xinghua Bay between Xiaori Island and Dasheyu Island off the coast of Fuzhou. She broke in two shortly after that.

=== 4 December ===
List of shipwrecks: 4 December 2025
Ship	State	Description
Pavlof	United States	The fishing vessel sank in the Chilkat Inlet in the harbor of Haines, Alaska.
Unknown	Flag unknown	A fishing vessel capsized in the Yellow Sea some 1.3 nautical miles (2.5 km) north west of Cheonlipo, South Korea. Three crew were rescued and three others died.
26 fishing boats	Vietnam	2025 Central Vietnam floods: The fishing vessels sank in the Phuoc The River, Lien Huong estuary, Lam Dong province, due to flooding. Twelve boats were salvaged.

=== 6 December ===
List of shipwrecks: 6 December 2025
Ship	State	Description
Unnamed	Libya	A dinghy sailing from Tobruk, Libya, carrying migrants, partially sunk after an engine failure south of Crete, Greece. Seventeen people were killed, two were rescued and 15 were reported missing.

=== 9 December ===
List of shipwrecks: 9 December 2025
Ship	State	Description
NA-98687-TS	Vietnam	The fishing vessel sank in the Gulf of Tonkin some 50 nautical miles (93 km) east of Hà Tĩnh, Vietnam, after being struck by high waves off Hoàng Mai. Seven crew members were rescued and another was reported missing.

=== 11 December ===
List of shipwrecks: 11 December 2025
Ship	State	Description
Resolute	United Kingdom	The guard boat ran aground on rocks in St. George’s Channel near Dinas Head, Pembrokeshire while seeking shelter in a storm with near gale force winds. Her crew were rescued. Scrapping in place began 28 June, 2026.
Unnamed	Bosnia and Herzegovina	A boat carrying migrants capsized on the Sava river in Slavonski Brod while attempting to cross the Bosnia and Herzegovina–Croatia border. One person was killed and several others were injured.

=== 14 December ===
List of shipwrecks: 14 December 2025
Ship	State	Description
Fastnet	France	The fishing vessel ran aground in Dingle Bay near Binn Bán beach off Cuan an Daingin, County Kerry, Ireland after engine failure. Her crew were rescued by helicopter.
Vila de Caminha	Portugal	The fishing vessel capsized off the mouth of the Miño River. Two crew were rescued, and three were reported missing. The vessel washed ashore and was removed.

=== 15 December ===
List of shipwrecks: 15 December 2025
Ship	State	Description
QT 905599 TS	Vietnam	The fishing vessel capsized and sank in the South China Sea3 nautical miles (5.6 km) north east of Cồn Cỏ Island (17°10′N 107°24′E) in large waves. The fishing vessel QT-91090-TS (Vietnam) rescued all six crew members.
Unnamed	Russian Navy	Russian invasion of Ukraine: A Kilo-class submarine was severely damaged by a Ukrainian Sub Sea Baby drone at Novorossiysk.
Valor III	United States	The fishing vessel sank in the Pacific Ocean 3 miles (4.8 km) west of Newport, Oregon. Her crew were rescued.

=== 16 December ===
List of shipwrecks: 16 December 2025
Ship	State	Description
Carlos Cunha	Portugal	The fishing vessel sank in the Atlantic Ocean approximately 200 nautical miles (370 km) off Aveiro, Portugal. The fishing vessel Artur e Teresa (Portugal) rescued 3 crew members from a life raft, one died afterwards; four crew were reported missing.

=== 17 December ===
List of shipwrecks: 17 December 2025
Ship	State	Description
QNa 91917 TS	Vietnam	The fishing vessel caught fire and sank in the Gulf of Thailand approximately 110 nautical miles (200 km) northeast of Da Nam Island. Fishing vessels Ng 95454-TS, QNg 95179-TS, QNa 91234-TS, and PY 90779-TS, all (Vietnam) rescued all 52 crew members from life rafts.
Unnamed	United States	A barge sprung a leak and sank partially submerged in the Snohomish River near Everett, Washington. It was expected to be raised.

=== 18 December ===
List of shipwrecks: 18 December 2025
Ship	State	Description
Valery Gorchakov	Russia	Russian invasion of Ukraine: The tanker was hit by Ukrainian drones at Rostov-on-Don and at least partially sunk.

=== 19 December ===
List of shipwrecks: 19 December 2025
Ship	State	Description
Unknown	Flag unknown	A fishing vessel capsized in the Yellow Sea 7.0 nautical miles (13 km) north of Seonmido Island, Deokjeok-myeon, South Korea. Four crew were rescued by a nearby vessel and one other was reported missing.

=== 23 December ===
List of shipwrecks: 23 December 2025
Ship	State	Description
Sea Dragon II	United States	The fishing vessel ran ashore in the Pacific Ocean at Ventura, California.
Unknown	Flag unknown	A fishing vessel caught fire in the Sea of Japan some 11 nautical miles (20 km) southeast of Songjeong-dong, South Korea. She burned out, a total loss. Eight crew were rescued by the South Korea Coast Guard.

=== 26 December ===
List of shipwrecks: 26 December 2025
Ship	State	Description
Unnamed	Indonesia	A tour boat suffered an engine failure and sank near Padar. Four people were killed, and seven others were rescued. The victims were identified as a Valencia CF association football coach and three of his children.

=== 27 December ===
List of shipwrecks: 27 December 2025
Ship	State	Description
Sharandy of the Seas	Indonesia	The sailing vessel lost stability and developed a severe list to port in a storm before it rolled over and sank, partially submerged in the Bali Sea off Serangan Island, Bali.

=== 28 December ===
List of shipwrecks: 28 December 2025
Ship	State	Description
Coral Adventurer	Australia	The cruise ship ran aground on a reef off Finschhafen east of Lae, Papua New Guinea. There were no injuries.

=== 31 December ===
List of shipwrecks: 31 December 2025
Ship	State	Description
Unnamed	Australia	A civilian vessel capsized 22 nautical miles (40 km) off the coast of Barrenjoey Head, Palm Beach, New South Wales, leaving a man deceased and a boy missing.

=== Unknown date ===
List of shipwrecks: unknown December 2025
Ship	State	Description
Hawaii	United States	The 24-metre (78.7 ft) tugboat sank at dock in Presque Isle Bay at Erie, Pennsylvania around the end of the month.
Julie Ann	United States	The 54-foot (16.5 m) fishing vessel and eight other vessels were capsized or sunk by 50 inches (130 cm) of snow falling 30–31 December in the Gastineau Channel in Juneau harbor, Alaska.
