= Cedar Cove =

Cedar Cove may refer to:

- Cedar Cove (Cazenovia, New York), historic house listed on the National Register of Historic Places
- Cedar Cove (Newfoundland and Labrador), also called Wild Cove or Capelin Cove, in the west, near the Bay of Islands
- Cedar Cove (fictional community), setting of book series by author Debbie Macomber
- Cedar Cove (TV series), a television series based on book series by Debbie Macomber
- Cedar Cove Feline Conservatory & Sanctuary, an animal shelter
