= Cedar Cove (Newfoundland and Labrador) =

Community in Newfoundland and Labrador

Cedar Cove, also called Wild Cove or Capelin Cove, is a small community on the western side of Newfoundland and Labrador, near the Bay of Islands.

In February 2025 the container ship MSC Baltic III was driven aground here in severe weather conditions.
