= 2025 Red Sea tourist submarine disaster =

2025 tourist submarine sinking

- Date: 27 March 2025
- Time: 8:00 AM (GMT)
- Location: Red Sea off the coast of Hurghada, Egypt
- Type: Shipwreck
- Cause: Under investigation
- Participants: 50
- Deaths: 6
- Injuries: 14

On March 27, 2025, a tourist submarine sank in the Red Sea while being boarded off the coast of Hurghada, Egypt. The sinking resulted in the deaths of six people and the rescue of 39 others. The incident raised concerns about safety standards in Egypt's tourist submarine industry.

== Background ==
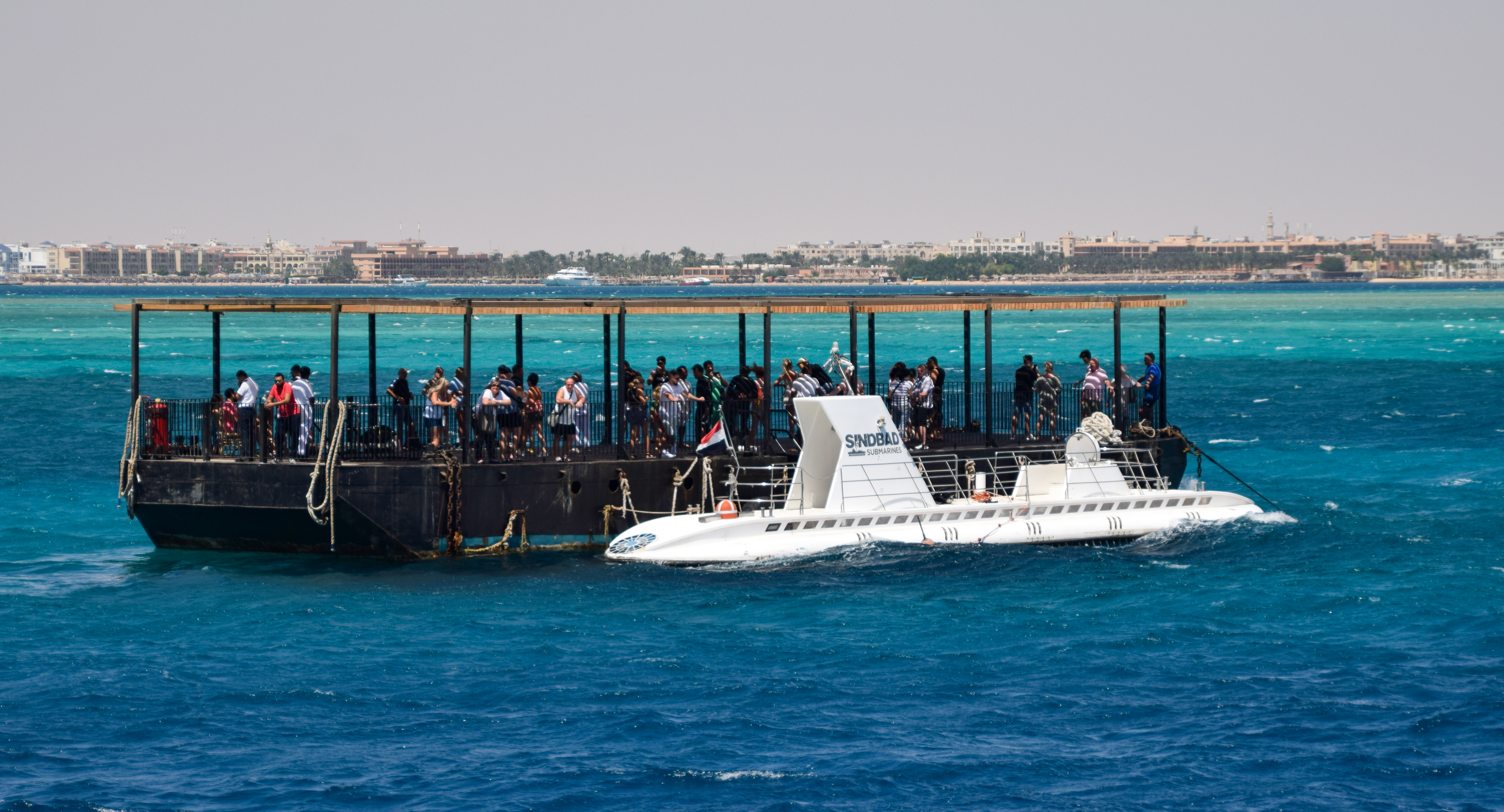
The tourist submarine Sindbad (right) next to the floating boarding platform in 2023

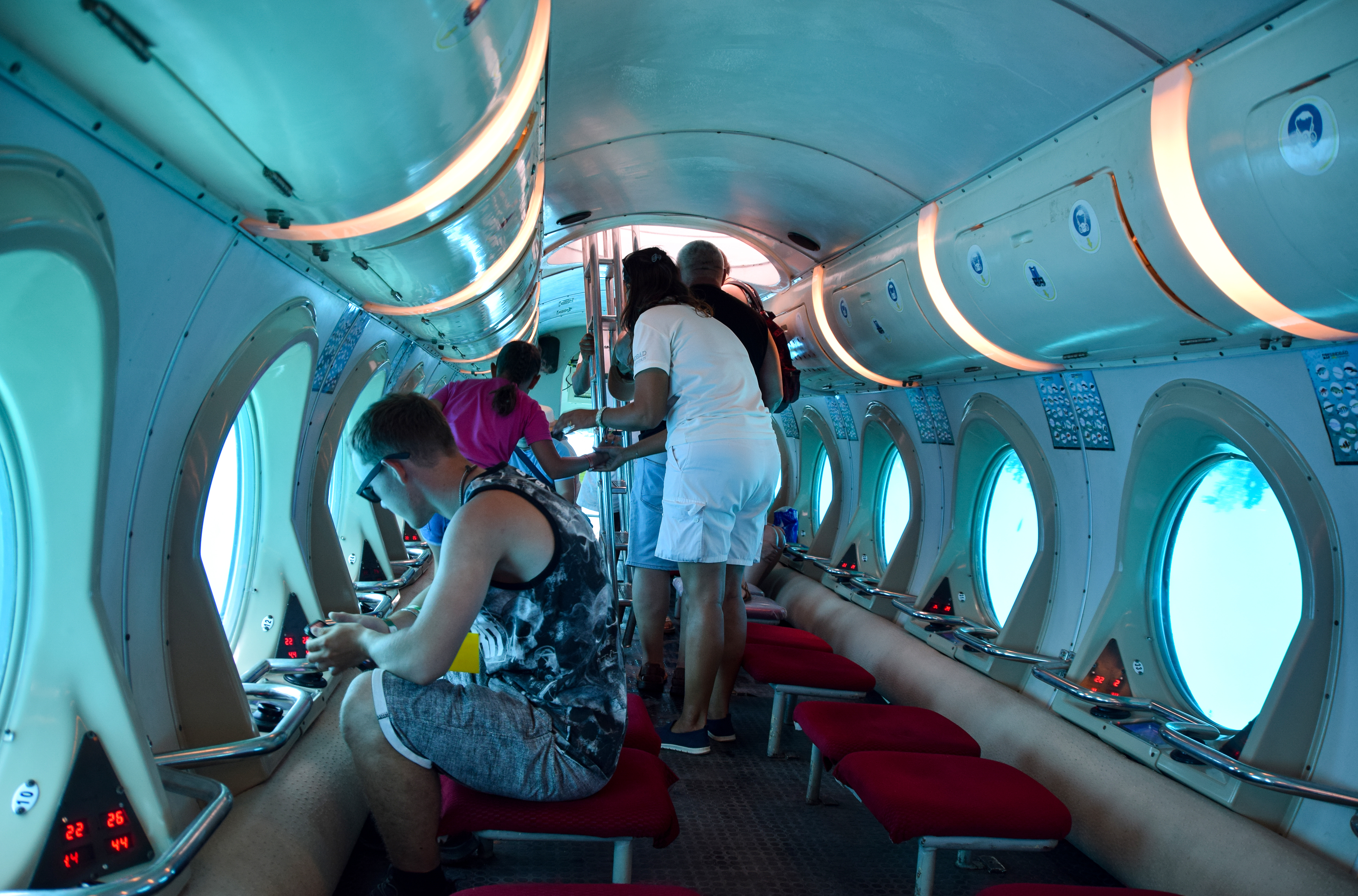
The submarine's ladder leading out through the hatch is shown in 2023

The submarine involved was owned by Sindbad Submarines, a tourism company operating in the Red Sea as a tourist attraction that claims to have over 25 years of experience. The company owns two submarines capable of diving 25 meters (82 ft) underwater. Sindbad claimed that its submarines were built in Finland and met safety standards.

The Red Sea coastline is a popular spot for tourists visiting Egypt. However, many vessels in the region operate daily with inconsistent adherence to safety rules. In early November 2024, 30 individuals were rescued from a boat that was sinking near Daedalus Reef. Later in the same month, the tourist boat Sea Story sank, leaving four people dead. Similarly, in June 2024, 24 French tourists had to be evacuated before their vessel went under.

A Maritime Survey International report published in March 2024 revealed that none of the examined vessels had proper maintenance systems, safety protocols, or stability documentation. The report highlighted that the industry operates with little to no regulation. The submarine had experienced technical issues prior to the accident.

== Sinking ==
The tourist submarine was carrying 45 passengers from Russia, India, Norway, and Sweden, including children, along with five crew members on part of a tour organized by Biblio Globus. (Note: Biblio Globus (BG) (Russian: «Библио Глобус» («БГ»)) was formed in 1994 by Alexander Tugolukov (Russian: Александр Туголуков; born January 1971) and his wife Yulia Tugolukov (Russian: Юлия Туголукова) after he graduated from Higher School of the KGB (FSB) in 1994. They opened their first office, which was only 3 square meters in Moscow on Lubyanka in 1994 in the Biblio-Globus bookstore, which was co-owned by Alexander Tugolukov's father-in-law Boris Yesenkin (Russian: Борис Есенькин): the bookstore gave its name to the Tugoklukov associated travel company "Biblio Globus" (BG). Beginning in July 2015, all Biblio Globus associated tours outside of Russia were sold by BG Caribbean LLC (Russian: ООО «БГ Карибы») whose founder is Denis Shchukin (Russian: Денис Щукин) and general director is Anna Bagdasaryan (Russian: Анна Багдасарян). In addition to tours to Cuba, Biblio Globus is a monopolist for tours to Jamaica. Inside of Russia since 2015, Biblio Globus is closely associated with the interests of the family of FSB General Vasily Petukhov (Russian: Василий Петухов) who, in 2021, is the head of the FSB Investigation Department (Russian: главы Следственного управления ФСБ) after Mikhail Shishov (Russian: Михаил Шишов) resigned due to senority on 5 August 2020. In 2015, Biblio-Globus Rus LLC (Russian: ООО «Библио-Глобус Русь»), (Note: Biblio-Globus Rus LLC (Russian: ООО «Библио-Глобус Русь») was owned by both Alexander Tugolukov (80%) and Biblio Globus Consultant LLC (Russian: ООО «Библио Глобус Консультант») (20%), which, in turn, is owned by Elena Petukhova (Russian: Елена Петухова; born one year younger than Vasily Petukhov, Krasnodar) and Natalia Protsenko (Russian: Наталья Проценко). (Note: Natalia Protsenko (Russian: Наталья Проценко) husband is Sergey Vladimirovich Protsenko (Russian: Сергей Владимирович Проценко; born 18 May 1966, Serakhs, Ashgabat region, Turkmen SSR, USSR) who graduated from FSB Academy in 1995 and was counterintelligence KGB, FSK, FSB of Russia for 23 years from 1983 to 2006 and since 7 March 2013, is the Director of the Administrative Department of the Government of the Russian Federation.) Elena Petukhova and Natalia Protsenko founded BG Consultant (Russian: «БГ Консультант») at the end of April 2015. In 2017, Elena Petukhova together with FSB Major General Vyacheslav Polezhaev, founded BG Innovations (Russian: «БГ Инновации»), in which Tugolukov also had a share, and, in 2018, transferred all assets from BG Consultant to BG Innovations.) BG Asia and Africa LLC (Russian: «БГ Азия и Африка»), which was founded by Denis Moiseev (Russian: Денис Моисеев), and BG Caribbean LLC form a tourist product for Biblio-Globus Operator LLC (Russian: ООО «Библио-Глобус Оператор»), which was founded by its general director Irina Kostenko (Russian: Ирина Костенко).) It sank about 1 km (0.6 mi) off the shore of Hurghada near the Hurghada harbour. Ambulances were deployed to the scene to transport the injured people to nearby hospitals. Six people were killed and at least fourteen others were injured, including four critically. The immediate cause of the sinking is disputed. A survivor reported that water poured into the submarine through two open hatches as passengers boarded, while other unconfirmed reports suggested the submarine hit a reef at 20 meters depth, leading to a loss of pressure.

== Aftermath ==
Following the sinking, the Egyptian Navy and the Egyptian Coast Guard launched an urgent rescue operation, with emergency teams rescuing 39 survivors, 14 of whom were hospitalized. Red Sea governor Amr Hanafy assured that an investigation was underway to determine the cause of the accident. Meanwhile, Russian consular officials arrived in Hurghada to assist the families of the deceased and survivors, some of whom required medical treatment for injuries and shock.

Sindbad Submarines immediately suspended all excursions and canceled upcoming trips. The company, which described itself as having "years of experience" in underwater tourism, faced scrutiny over its safety protocols. While Sindbad claimed its submarines were engineered in Finland and built to withstand depths of up to 75 meters, survivors and past passengers raised concerns about the lack of safety drills and emergency preparedness.

Concerns have been raised about the impact of the sinking on Egyptian tourism in the area, following several high-profile incidents (including several shark attacks between 2022 and 2024 off the coast of Hurghada) and more than one incident of boats capsizing since 2021.

== See also ==
- List of shipwrecks in 2025
- 2024 Red Sea tourist boat disaster
