= Sablons, Isère =

Sablons
- Commune
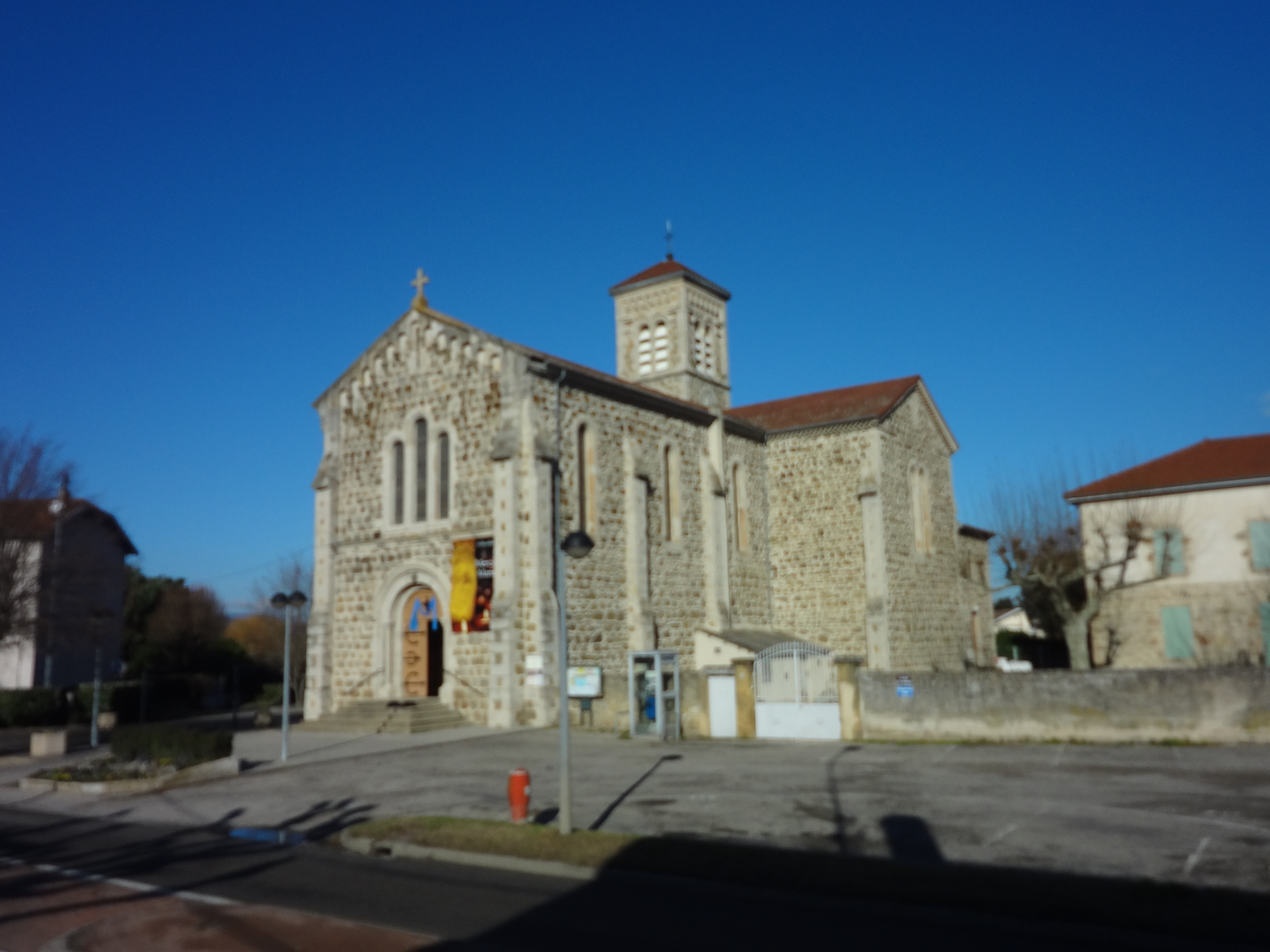
- The church of Saint-Ferréol, in Sablons
- Location of Sablons
- Location within France Location within Auvergne-Rhône-Alpes
- Coordinates: 45°19′08″N 4°46′26″E
- Country: France
- Region: Auvergne-Rhône-Alpes
- Department: Isère
- Arrondissement: Vienne
- Canton: Roussillon

Government
  - Mayor (2020–2026): Laurent Teil
- Area^{1}: 10.23 km^{2} (3.95 sq mi)
- Elevation: 137 m (449 ft)
- Highest elevation: 154 m (505 ft)
- Lowest elevation: 135 m (443 ft)
- Population (2023): 2,346
  - Density: 229.3/km^{2} (594.0/sq mi)
- Time zone: UTC+01:00 (CET)
  - Summer (DST): UTC+02:00 (CEST)
- INSEE/Postal code: 38349 /38550
- ^{1} French Land Register data, which excludes lakes, ponds, glaciers > 1 km^{2} (0.386 sq mi or 247 acres) and river estuaries.

Sablons (French pronunciation: [sablɔ̃]) is a commune in the Isère department in southeastern France.

== Population ==
Historical population

Year	Pop.	±% p.a.
1793	688	—
1821	908	+1.00%
1846	1,099	+0.77%
1872	811	−1.16%
1901	679	−0.61%
1926	673	−0.04%
1946	740	+0.48%
1962	880	+1.09%
1968	1,031	+2.67%

Year	Pop.	±% p.a.
1975	1,228	+2.53%
1982	1,421	+2.11%
1990	1,468	+0.41%
1999	1,539	+0.53%
2007	1,828	+2.17%
2012	2,101	+2.82%
2017	2,309	+1.91%
2023	2,346	+0.27%

Source: EHESS and INSEE (1968-2023)

== See also ==
- Communes of the Isère department
