= MV Isla de Bioko =

Tanker ship

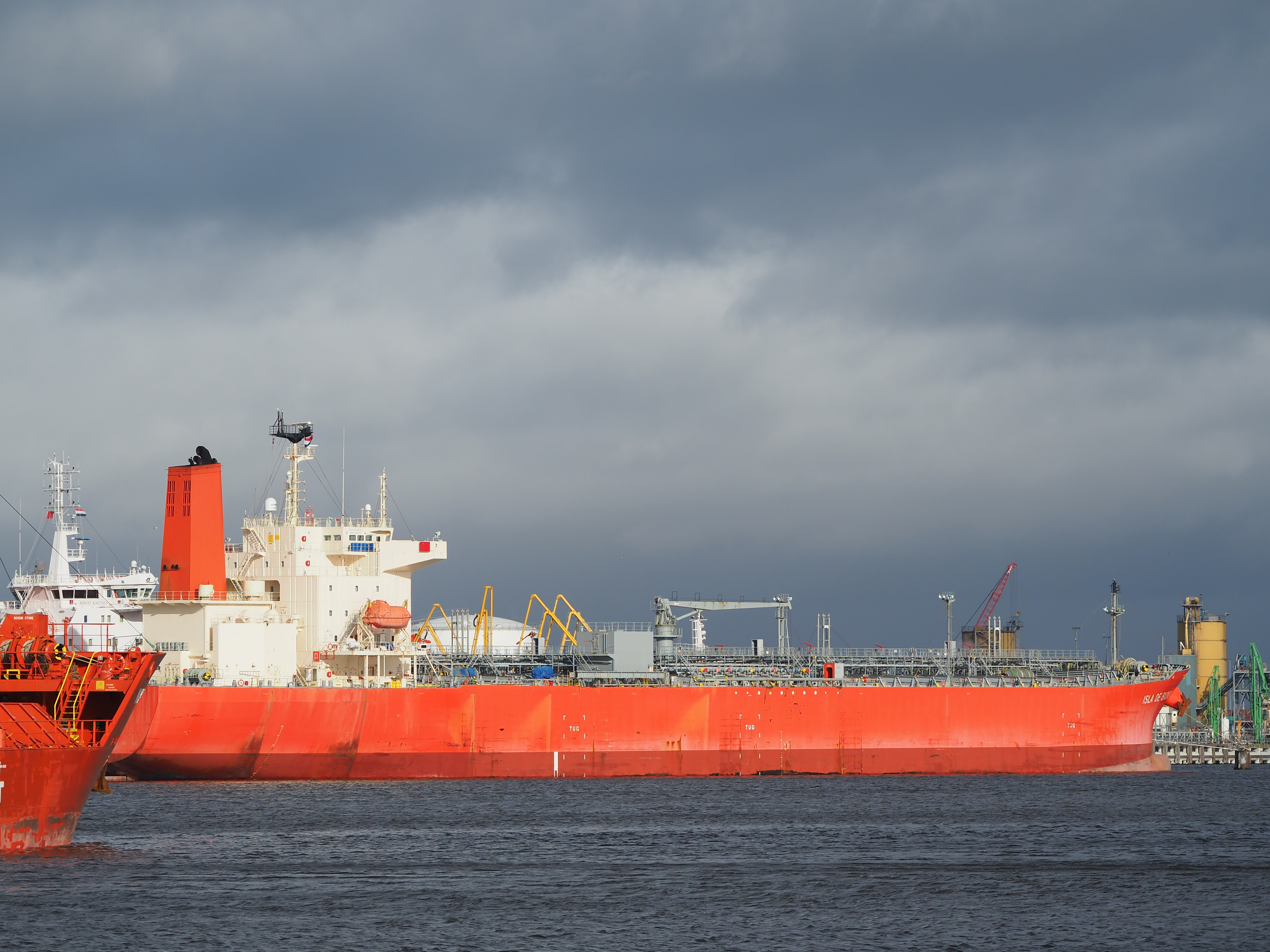
- Isla de Bioko in Port of Amsterdam

History
- Name: Isa de Bioko
- Owner: MOL (Americas) LLC
- Operator: MOL (Americas) LLC
- Port of registry: Panama
- Builder: Minaminippon Shipbuilding Co., Ltd. (purchased by Imabari Shipbuilding in 2018)
- Laid down: 22 December 2014
- Launched: 27 July 2015
- Completed: 24 February 2016
- Identification: IMO number: 9767235
- Status: In service

General characteristics
- Type: Tanker
- Tonnage: 30,480 GT
- Length: 186 m (610 ft 3 in) oa
- Installed power: 8,470 kW (11,360 hp)
- Speed: 16.4 knots (30.4 km/h; 18.9 mph)

MV Isla de Bioko is a tanker ship that flies under the flag of Panama. She was built in 2016 by Minaminippon Shipbuilding in their Ozai yard. She is in service, and is operated by MOL (Americas), a subsidiary of Mitsui O.S.K. Lines. Her namesake is the island of Bioko in Equatorial Guinea.

== Collision ==
At around 9:20 P.M. (CDT) on 29 April 2025, Isla de Bioko collided with the tow boat Ginny Stone in the Lower Mississippi River near New Orleans. Ginny Stone had previously been moored on the left bank of the river, but turned out into the channel, and this is when Isla de Bioko collided with her at about mile marker 110. The incident has been attributed to a period of unusually high water in the river, making the vessels harder to control. As a result, six barges detached, and one barge filled with urea sank. The river was closed to vessel traffic and reopened at 3:00 P.M. on 5 May.
