= MV De Zonnebloem =

Dutch ship

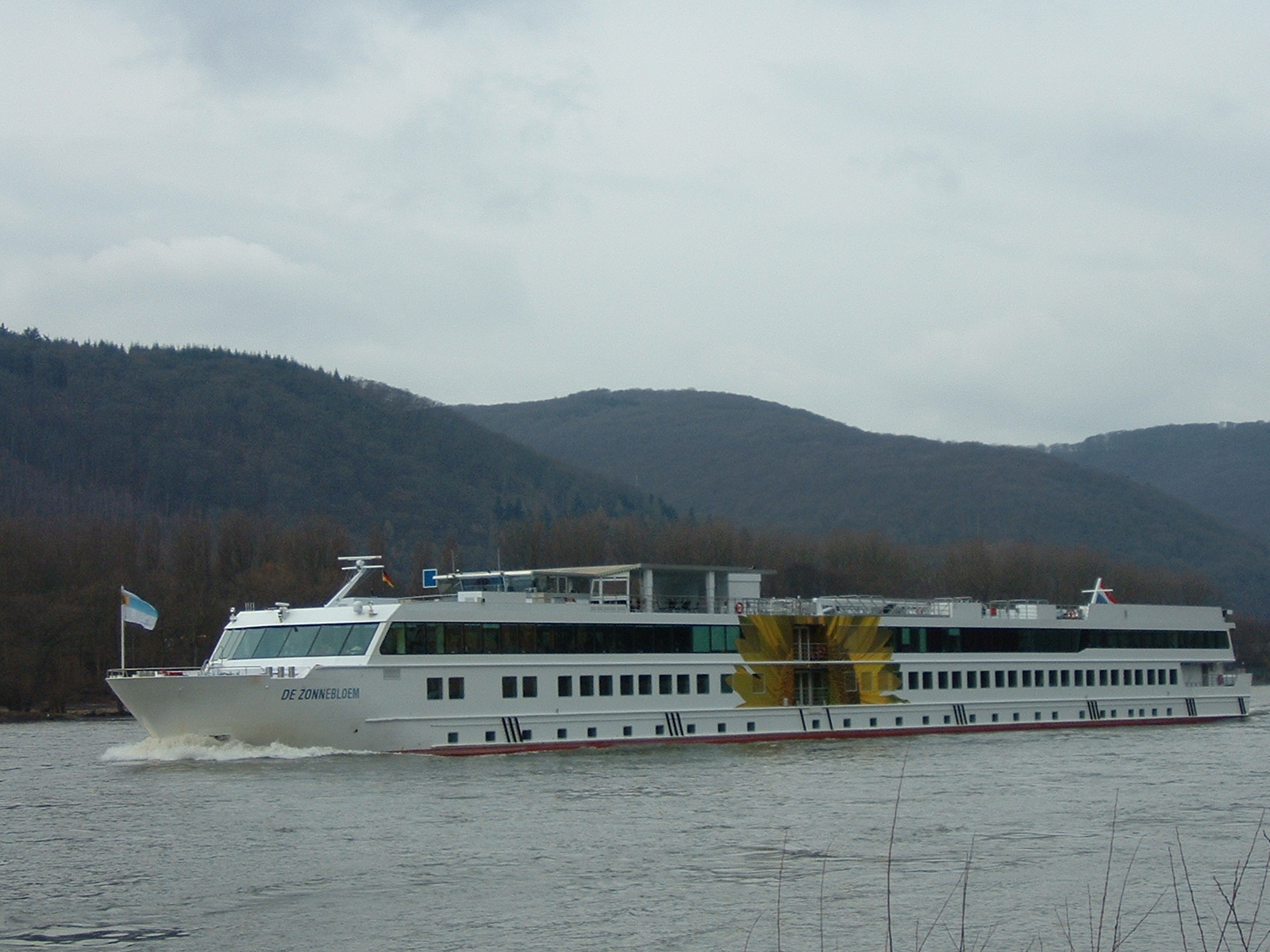
- MS De Zonnebloem in 2007

History
- Name: De Zonnebloem
- Port of registry: Netherlands
- Builder: IHC Merwede, Kinderdijk, Netherlands
- Launched: 27 August 2005
- Christened: 20 December 2005
- Acquired: 2005
- In service: 2005
- Identification: ENI: 02327391
- Status: Out of service (as of March 2025)

General characteristics
- Type: River cruise ship
- Length: 115 m (377 ft 4 in)
- Beam: 11.5 m (37 ft 9 in)
- Draught: 1.7 m (5 ft 7 in)
- Decks: 4
- Propulsion: 4× azimuth thrusters (2 bow, 2 stern)
- Speed: Approx. 22 km/h downstream
- Capacity: 135 passengers
- Crew: 11 crew + ~65 volunteers (including 25 nurses and a doctor)

MS De Zonnebloem is a Dutch river cruise ship specially designed to accommodate people with physical disabilities. It was built by IHC Merwede in Kinderdijk and completed in Hardinxveld-Giessendam in 2005. The ship is operated by Motorpassagiersschip De Zonnebloem B.V. (not to be confused with the Dutch volunteer organization De Zonnebloem). She typically sails 42 cruises annually through the Netherlands, parts of Belgium, and Germany, providing holiday experiences to roughly 2,850 people with physical impairments.

On 29 March 2025, she collided with a cargo vessel on the Rhine near Wesel, Germany. Suffering serious damage, she was out of service for months.

== Design and facilities ==
The ship measures 115 meters in length and 11.5 meters in width, with a draft of 1.70 meters. It has four decks: sun deck, salon deck, main deck, and lower deck. Elevators and the bridge can be hydraulically lowered for passing under bridges.

It is equipped with four azimuth thrusters—twin screws fore and aft—that enable rotation on its axis and sideways docking. The ship has 11 single and 29 double cabins, all adapted for accessibility. It accommodates 135 passengers and typically sails with 11 crew members and around 65 volunteers, including nurses and a doctor. In 2010, the ship was modernized with new furnishings, two obesity-accessible cabins, an expanded dishwashing kitchen, and improved energy systems, resulting in fuel savings of up to 5,000 liters of diesel per week.

== 2025 collision ==
On 29 March 2025, MS De Zonnebloem collided with a cargo vessel on the Rhine near Wesel, Germany. The cruise ship suffered serious damage and was rendered inoperable. All 149 people on board, including 69 guests, were safely evacuated. The cargo ship's captain was later found to have been under the influence of alcohol.

=== Impact and response ===
Due to the ship's prolonged unavailability, around 700 cruise passengers saw their holiday plans cancelled. In April 2025, hundreds of suitcases were placed along the Waal riverbank in Nijmegen as a symbolic protest, representing those who missed their opportunity to travel. Each suitcase was labeled with a passenger's name.
