= 2025 Kerala oil spill =

Environmental disaster

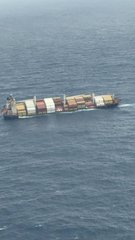
- The container ship MSC Elsa 3 while sinking
- Location: Vizhinjam port to Kochi, Arabian Sea
- Date: 25 May 2025

Cause
- Cause: Sinking of MSC Elsa 3
- Casualties: 0

The 2025 Kerala oil spill occurred after the Liberian-flagged vessel MSC Elsa 3 capsized in the Arabian Sea on May 25, near Kochi due to flooding in one of its compartments. The vessel was carrying 640 containers, including hazardous materials such as calcium carbide and sulphur, alongside the diesel and furnace oil. All 24 crew members, including the captain and engineers aboard were safely rescued by the Indian Navy and Coast Guard after a coordinated rescue operation. No major oil spill had reached Kerala’s shoreline by Tuesday noon, though an oil slick was detected near the sinking site. Several containers were washed along the Kerala coast in locations including Neendakara, Sakthikulangara, Chavara, Cheriazheekkal, and Thrikkunnapuzha. Authorities have imposed a fishing restriction within a 20-nautical-mile radius of the site.

The Kerala government has issued a high alert and response teams including Indian Coast Guard, Navy, Forest Department, Pollution Control Board, and local disaster management authorities were sent across coastal districts to manage pollution control and cleanup operations. AITUC State president T.J. Anjelose appointed a judicial commission to investigate compliance with International Maritime Organization safety norms, to study long-term ecological impacts, and to ensure compensation for affected fishermen.

== Incident ==
On 25 May 2025, the Liberian-flagged container ship MSC Elsa 3 sank roughly 38 nautical miles southwest of Kochi, Kerala, after flooding in one of its holds caused it to eventually capsize. The vessel was loaded with 640–643 containers, including 13 with hazardous materials (such as calcium carbide and sulphur), and carried 84.44 tonnes of diesel and 367.1 tonnes of furnace oil. Amid monsoon conditions, more than 100 containers were reported lost at sea, with at least 20 confirmed to have washed ashore. All 24 crew members, 21 evacuated the previous evening and the remaining three, including the captain and chief engineer, rescued early Sunday were safely brought ashore by the Indian Navy and Coast Guard.

== Aftermath ==
The Indian Coast Guard deployed INS Sujata, ICGS Arnvesh and ICGS Saksham and a Dornier aircraft to contain and monitor oil slicks under the "National Oil Spill Disaster Contingency Plan", following the sinking of MSC Elsa 3. As of 27 May 2025, a few oil traces were detected offshore and defense sources confirmed that no significant spill had reached Kerala’s coastline. Authorities issued public advisories urging residents to maintain a minimum 200 metre distance from any washed-up containers and to report sightings to emergency services. Fishing activities were prohibited within a 20 nautical-mile radius of the wreck site.

Chief Minister Pinarayi Vijayan declared a statewide coastal high alert and directed the deployment of rapid response teams in all coastal districts. Local administration initiated beach cleanup efforts to remove hazardous debris. A facilitation centre was set up in Kochi under the jurisdiction of Capt. Aneesh Joseph, coordinating interim relief and insurance claims. Fishermen from Thiruvananthapuram, Kollam, Alappuzha, and Ernakulam were effected. The Fort Kochi Coastal Police registered a criminal FIR against the ship’s master and crew under sections of the Indian Penal Code for navigation errors and environmental negligence. The Chief Secretary advised the state from pursue charges immediately, to avoid jeopardizing evidence critical for insurance processing.

A year-long study by researchers from the Suganthi Devadason Marine Research Institute, the Tamil Nadu Pollution Control Board, the University of Kerala and the Kerala University of Fisheries and Ocean Studies surveyed 93 coastal sites in Kerala and Tamil Nadu and found that plastic pellets released after the sinking had continued to contaminate the coast. Pellet concentrations peaked at 31,230 per square metre at Varkala soon after the spill and fell by more than 80 per cent within three months, but new hotspots emerged in the Gulf of Mannar, and by May 2026 pellets were found buried up to 20 cm deep in beach sediment. Of 2,413 fish examined, 26 (1.08 per cent) had ingested pellets or had them trapped in their gills or digestive tracts. The study was published in Marine Pollution Bulletin.

== Broader Implications ==
The sinking of MSC Elsa 3 has raised concerns about maritime safety practices in Indian waters, particularly the transport of hazardous materials. The Liberian-flagged vessel was carrying 13 containers with hazardous cargo including 12 containers of calcium carbide when it sank around 14.6 nautical miles off the coast of Kerala. While no significant oil slick had reached Kerala’s shores as of 27 May 2025, the Indian Coast Guard deployed containment vessels and aircraft to monitor and manage the probable risk. Officials confirmed a minor fuel leak and warned that rough seas and monsoon currents could disperse oil and debris along multiple coastal districts. Environmental concerns began after containers started washing ashore in Kollam and Alappuzha districts. The Kerala government imposed restrictions on fishing activities within a 20-nautical-mile radius and issued warnings against handling any washed-up cargo. The State also deployed rapid response teams to recover debris and mitigate contamination risks from potential oil settling on the seabed. The All India Trade Union Congress (AITUC) demanded the government to form a judicial commission to investigate the ship’s compliance with International Maritime Organization (IMO) safety norms. The union also requested disclosure of the full list of hazardous cargo and compensation for fishing communities affected by the potential pollution.

The incident has also triggered debate about the risks associated with “flags of convenience.” Despite being managed internationally, the ship was registered in Liberia and the practice that allows shipowners to operate under jurisdictions with more lenient regulatory regimes. Marine ecology experts have warned that even trace quantities of furnace oil, in combination with calcium carbide and plastic waste, could lead to long-term disruption of benthic habitats and affect marine biodiversity along the Kerala coast. Down to Earth says, the Kerala State Pollution Control Board (KSPCB) admitted it lacks a finalized oil spill contingency plan, a significant shortfall given Kerala’s vulnerable coastline which lies near an international oil shipping route. Although initial planning began in 2016, delays and re-tendering processes have halted completion of the emergency response plan.
