= MV Glyvursnes =

Faroe Islands cargo ship

History
- Name: Seagard (1999); Glyvursnes (2024)
- Owner: Smyril Line
- Port of registry: Tórshavn, Faroe Islands
- Route: Þorlákshöfn—Tórshavn—Hirtshals
- Completed: 1999
- Identification: IMO number: 9198977; Call Sign: 0Z2214

General characteristics
- Tonnage: 7,226 DWT
- Length: 153 m (502 ft 0 in)
- Beam: 20.6 m (67 ft 7 in)
- Draught: 7 m (23 ft 0 in)
- Speed: 21 knots (39 km/h; 24 mph)
- Crew: 12

MV Glyvursnes is a roll-on/roll-off cargo ship registered in the Faroe Islands and owned by the Smyril Line. Built in 1999 under the name Seagard, the vessel began servicing a route between the Faroes, Iceland, and Denmark in 2024. In January 2025, an explosion in the ship's engine room while in port caused the death of a crewmember.

== Description ==
Glyvursnes has a 10,448 gross tonnage (GT), a length of 153 metres (502 ft 0 in), a beam of 20.6 metres (67 ft 7 in), and a draught of 7 metres (23 ft). It is powered by a Wärtsilä propulsion system and has a maximum speed of 21 knots (39 km/h; 24 mph), with space for 12 crewmembers.

The ship has a total cargo area of 4,827 square metres (51,960 sq ft) on the weatherdeck, maindeck, and tanktop. The maindeck has a volume of 9,336 cubic metres (329,700 cu ft) and the tanktop has a volume of 4,929 cubic metres (174,100 cu ft). There are two 12-metre (39 ft) stern ramps, as well as fixed ramps on the lower hold and weatherdeck.

== History ==
The ship was built in 1999 by Pella Sietas in Germany under the name Seagard for the shipping company Transfennica. The vessel was transferred to a Finnish company, who in 2023 sold the ship to Smyril Line. It was renamed to Glyvursnes after a Faeroese island and replaced the chartered vessel Mistral. In 2024, the ship began servicing a regular route between Tórshavn in the Faroes, Þorlákshöfn in Iceland, and Hirtshals in Denmark.

On 2 January 2025, while at the pier in Hirtshals, there was an explosion in the engine room aboard Glyvursnes. One crewmember was killed in the incident and two others were hospitalized. The vessel remained in port and later continued operations.
