= Houthi attacks on commercial vessels =

Houthi piracy in the Red Sea

Map of Houthi activity near the Yemeni coast: Houthi-controlled Yemen (SPC) Government of Yemen (PLC) Houthi attacks (red) and hijackings (blue)

As part of the Red Sea crisis, Houthi attacks on commercial vessels have occurred in the Red Sea.

Houthi forces began attacking shipping vessels affiliated with Israel passing through the Red Sea on 19 November 2023. By February, 40 vessels had been attacked. Global shipping companies, which had typically sailed through the Red Sea, as well as the Suez Canal, instead moved to position their vessels around the Cape of Good Hope, off the Cape Peninsula, South Africa. Between November and December 2023, a 1.3 percent decrease in global trade resulted from Houthi attacks on commercial shipping in the Red Sea. By March 2024, over 2,000 ships had diverted routes away from the Red Sea, making costlier voyages, since the first Houthi attack the previous November.

Initial Houthi pledges to target any ship with links to Israel were followed by attacks on ships connected to over a dozen nations, as well, stated, in January 2024, as avenging "American-British aggression against our country". US Central Command responded that the Houthis attacks "have nothing to do with the conflict in Gaza" and that Houthis had "fired indiscriminately into the Red Sea", targeting ships, and impacting more than 40 nations. On 3 May 2024, the Houthi-aligned Yemeni Armed Forces SPC military spokesperson Yahya Saree announced, in a televised speech, that "We will target any ships heading to Israeli ports in the Mediterranean Sea in any area we are able to reach".

== Timeline ==
=== List ===
Attacks on commercial vessels
| # | Date | Vessel attacked | | Agent | Result | Ref |
| # | Date | Name | Flag | Agent | Result | Ref |
|---|---|---|---|---|---|---|
| 1 | 19 November 2023 | Galaxy Leader | Bahamas | Houthi Mil Mi-17 helicopter | Captured | |
| 2 | 24 November 2023 | CMA CGM Symi | Malta | Iran (Alleged) | Damaged | |
| 3 | 26 November 2023 | Central Park | Liberia | Houthi crew | Unharmed | |
| 4 | 3 December 2023 | Number 9 | Panama | Houthi ballistic missile | Minor damage | |
| 5 | 3 December 2023 | Sophie II | Panama | Houthi ballistic missile | Minor damage | |
| 6 | 3 December 2023 | Unity Explorer | Bahamas | Houthi ballistic missile | Minor damage | |
| 7 | 12 December 2023 | Strinda | Norway | Houthi missile | Set afire | |
| 8 | 13 December 2023 | Ardmore Encounter | Marshall Islands | Houthi drones | Unharmed | |
| 9 | 14 December 2023 | Maersk Gibraltar | Hong Kong | Houthi missile | Unharmed | |
| 10 | 15 December 2023 | MSC Alanya | Liberia | Houthi naval missile | Unknown | |
| 11 | 15 December 2023 | MSC Palatium III | Liberia | Houthi Naval missile | Unknown | |
| 12 | 15 December 2023 | Al-Jasrah | Liberia | Houthi projectile | Set afire | |
| 13 | 18 December 2023 | MSC Clara | Panama | Houthi drones | Unknown | |
| 14 | 18 December 2023 | Swan Atlantic | Norway | Houthi drones | Minor damage | |
| 15 | 26 December 2023 | MSC United VIII | Liberia | Houthi naval missile | Unknown | |
| 16 | 30 December 2023 | Maersk Hangzhou | Singapore | Houthi land-based missile | Minor damage | |
| 17 | 31 December 2023 | Maersk Hangzhou | Singapore | Houthi crew | Unharmed | |
| 18 | 12 January 2024 | Khalissa | Panama | Houthi projectile | Unknown | |
| 19 | 15 January 2024 | Gibraltar Eagle | Marshall Islands | Houthi anti-ship missile | Minor damage | |
| 20 | 16 January 2024 | Zografia | Malta | Ballistic missile | Minor damage | |
| 21 | 17 January 2024 | Genco Picardy | Marshall Islands | Houthi drone | Minor damage | |
| 22 | 18 January 2024 | Chem Ranger | Marshall Islands | Houthi anti-ship ballistic missile | Unharmed | |
| 23 | 22 January 2024 | Ocean Jazz | United States | Houthis | Unknown | |
| 24 | 24 January 2024 | Maersk Detroit | United States | Houthi missile | Unharmed | |
| 25 | 24 January 2024 | Maersk Chesapeake | United States | Houthi missile | Unharmed | |
| 26 | 26 January 2024 | Marlin Luanda | Marshall Islands | Houthi missile | Set afire | |
| 27 | 30 January 2024 | Koi | Liberia | Houthi naval missiles | Unknown | |
| 28 | 6 February 2024 | Morning Tide | Barbados | Houthis | Minor damage | |
| 29 | 6 February 2024 | Star Nasia | Marshall Islands | Houthis | Minor damage | |
| 30 | 12 February 2024 | Star Iris | Marshall Islands | Houthi missiles | Minor damage | |
| 31 | 16 February 2024 | Pollux | Panama | Houthi missile | Minor damage | |
| 32 | 18 February 2024 | Rubymar | Belize | Houthi anti-ship missile | Sunk | |
| 33 | 19 February 2024 | Sea Champion | Greece | Houthi naval missiles | Minor damage | |
| 34 | 19 February 2024 | Navis Fortuna | Marshall Islands | Houthi naval missile | Minor damage | |
| 35 | 22 February 2024 | Islander | Palau | Houthi missile | Damaged | |
| 36 | 6 March 2024 | True Confidence | Barbados | Houthi anti-ship missile | Set afire | |
| 37 | 8 March 2024 | Propel Fortune | Singapore | Houthi anti-ship missiles | Unknown | |
| 38 | 24 March 2024 | Huang Pu | Panama | Houthi anti-ship ballistic missile | Unknown | |
| 39 | 7 April 2024 | Hope Island | Marshall Islands | Houthis | Unknown | |
| 40 | 7 April 2024 | MSC Grace | Panama | Houthis | Unknown | |
| 41 | 7 April 2024 | MSC Gina | Panama | Houthis | Unknown | |
| 42 | 9 April 2024 | Maersk Yorktown | United States | Houthi anti-ship missile | Unharmed | |
| 43 | 9 April 2024 | MSC Gina | Panama | Houthis | Unknown | |
| 44 | 9 April 2024 | MSC Darwin VI | Liberia | Houthis | Unknown | |
| 45 | 24 April 2024 | Maersk Yorktown | United States | Houthi missile | Unharmed | |
| 46 | 24 April 2024 | MSC Veracruz | Portugal | Houthi anti-ship ballistic missile | Unknown | |
| 47 | 26 April 2024 | Andromeda Star | Panama | Houthi missiles | Minor damage | |
| 48 | 26 April 2024 | Maisha | Antigua and Barbuda | Houthi missile | Unharmed | |
| 49 | 29 April 2024 | Cyclades | Malta | Houthi missiles and UAVs | Minor damage | |
| 50 | 29 April 2024 | MSC Orion | Portugal | Houthi drones | Minor damage | |
| 51 | 18 May 2024 | Wind | Panama | Houthi missiles | Minor damage | |
| 52 | 23 May 2024 | Yannis | Malta | Houthi missiles | Unharmed | |
| 53 | 23 May 2024 | Essex | Liberia | Houthi missiles | Unharmed | |
| 54 | 28 May 2024 | Laax | Marshall Islands | Houthi missiles | Damaged | |
| 55 | 1 June 2024 | Abliani | Malta | Houthi drones and rockets | Unharmed | |
| 56 | 1 June 2024 | Maina | Malta | Houthi anti-ballistic missiles and armed drones | Unharmed | |
| 57 | 1 June 2024 | Al Oraiq | Marshall Islands | Houthi anti-ballistic missiles and armed drones | Unharmed | |
| 58 | 8–9 June 2024 | Norderney | Antigua and Barbuda | Houthi missiles | Set afire | |
| 59 | 8 June 2024 | MSC Tavivshi | Liberia | Houthi ballistic missile | Set afire | |
| 60 | 9 June 2024 | Unknown | Unknown | Houthi ballistic missile | Damaged | |
| 61 | 12 June 2024 | Tutor | Liberia | Houthi Toufan-1 USV, ballistic missiles, drones | Sunk | |
| 62 | 13 June 2024 | Verbena | Palau | Houthi cruise missiles | Set afire | |
| 63 | 13 June 2024 | Unknown | Unknown | Unknown Houthi weapons | Unharmed | |
| 64 | 16 June 2024 | Unknown | Unknown | Unknown | Unharmed | |
| 65 | 21 June 2024 | Transworld Navigator | Liberia | Houthi ballistic missiles | Unharmed | |
| 66 | 23 June 2024 | Transworld Navigator | Liberia | Houthi USV | Damaged | |
| 67 | 24 June 2024 | MSC Sarah V | Liberia | Houthi Hatem 2 hypersonic missile | Unharmed | |
| 68 | 26 June 2024 | Unknown | Unknown | Houthi missile | Unharmed | |
| 69 | 27 June 2024 | Unknown | Unknown | Likely Houthi USV | Unharmed | |
| 70 | 28 June 2024 | Delonix | Liberia | Houthi ballistic missiles | Unharmed | |
| 71 | 9 July 2024 | Maersk Sentosa | United States | Houthi missiles | Unharmed | |
| 72 | 10 July 2024 | Mount Fuji | Liberia | Likely Houthi weapons | Unharmed | |
| 73 | 11 July 2024 | Unknown | Unknown | Likely Houthi missiles | Unharmed | |
| 74 | 15 July 2024 | Bentley I | Panama | Houthi USV, patrol boats, ballistic missiles | Hit | |
| 75 | 15 July 2024 | Chios Lion | Liberia | Houthi USV | Damaged | |
| 76 | 19 July 2024 | Lobivia | Singapore | Houthi ballistic missiles, UAVs | Set afire | |
| 77 | 20 July 2024 | Pumba | Liberia | Houthi UAVs, USV | Damaged | |
| 78 | 3 August 2024 | Groton | Liberia | Houthi ballistic missiles | Hit | |
| 79 | 8–9 August 2024 | Delta Blue | Liberia | Houthi RPG, USV, missiles | Unharmed | |
| 80 | 13 August 2024 | Delta Atlantica | Liberia | Likely Houthi USV, other weapons | Hit | |
| 81 | 13 August 2024 | On Phoenix | Panama | Likely Houthi weapons | Unharmed | |
| 82 | 21–22 August 2024 | Sounion | Greece | Houthi boats, USV, other weapons | Set afire | |
| 83 | 21–22 August 2024 | SW North Wind I | Panama | Houthi USV, other weapons | Damaged | |
| 84 | 30 August 2024 | Groton | Liberia | Houthi missiles | Unharmed | |
| 85 | 2 September 2024 | Blue Lagoon I | Panama | Houthi ballistic missiles | Damaged | |
| 86 | 1 October 2024 | Cordelia Moon | Panama | Houthi missiles, USV | Damaged | |
| 87 | 1 October 2024 | Minoan Courage | Liberia | Houthi missile | Damaged | |
| 88 | 10 October 2024 | Olympic Spirit | Liberia | Houthi ballistic missiles, drones | Damaged | |
| 89 | 29 October 2024 | Motaro | Liberia | Houthi weapons | Unharmed | |
| 90 | 19 November 2024 | Anadolu S | Panama | Houthi missiles | Unharmed | |
| 91 | 6 July 2025 | Magic Seas | Liberia | Houthi gunfire, RPGs, USVs | Sunk | |
| 92 | 7–8 July 2025 | Eternity C | Liberia | Houthi UAVs, RPGs, USVs | Sunk | |
| 93 | 31 August 2025 | Scarlet Ray | Liberia | Houthi missile | Unharmed | |
| 94 | 2 September 2025 | MSC Aby | Liberia | Houthi drones, missile | Unharmed | |
| 95 | 4 September 2025 | Unknown | Unknown | Unknown projectile | Unharmed | |
| 96 | 23 September 2025 | Minervagracht | Netherlands | Unknown projectile | Unharmed | |
| 97 | 29 September 2025 | Minervagracht | Netherlands | Houthi cruise missile | Set afire | |
| 98 | 22 July 2026 | Encelia | Saudi Arabia | Houthi missiles and drones | Damaged | |
| 99 | 22 July 2026 | Layla | Saudi Arabia | Houthi missiles and drones | Unknown | |
| 100 | 24 July 2026 | NCC Masa | Saudi Arabia | Unknown projectile | Minor damage | |
| 101 | 28 July 2026 | NCC Ghazal | Saudi Arabia | Houthi anti-ship missiles | Damaged | |
| 102 | 4 August 2026 | Faize Noore Oliya | India | USV | Sunk | |
| 103 | 5 August 2026 | NCC Wafa | Saudi Arabia | Houthi ballistic missiles | Unknown | |
| 104 | 5 August 2026 | Daisy | Dominica | Houthi ballistic missile | Minor damage | |
| 105 | 11 August 2026 | Tihamah | Tanzania | Houthi ballistic missiles | Damaged | |

=== First and second phases (November – December 2023) ===
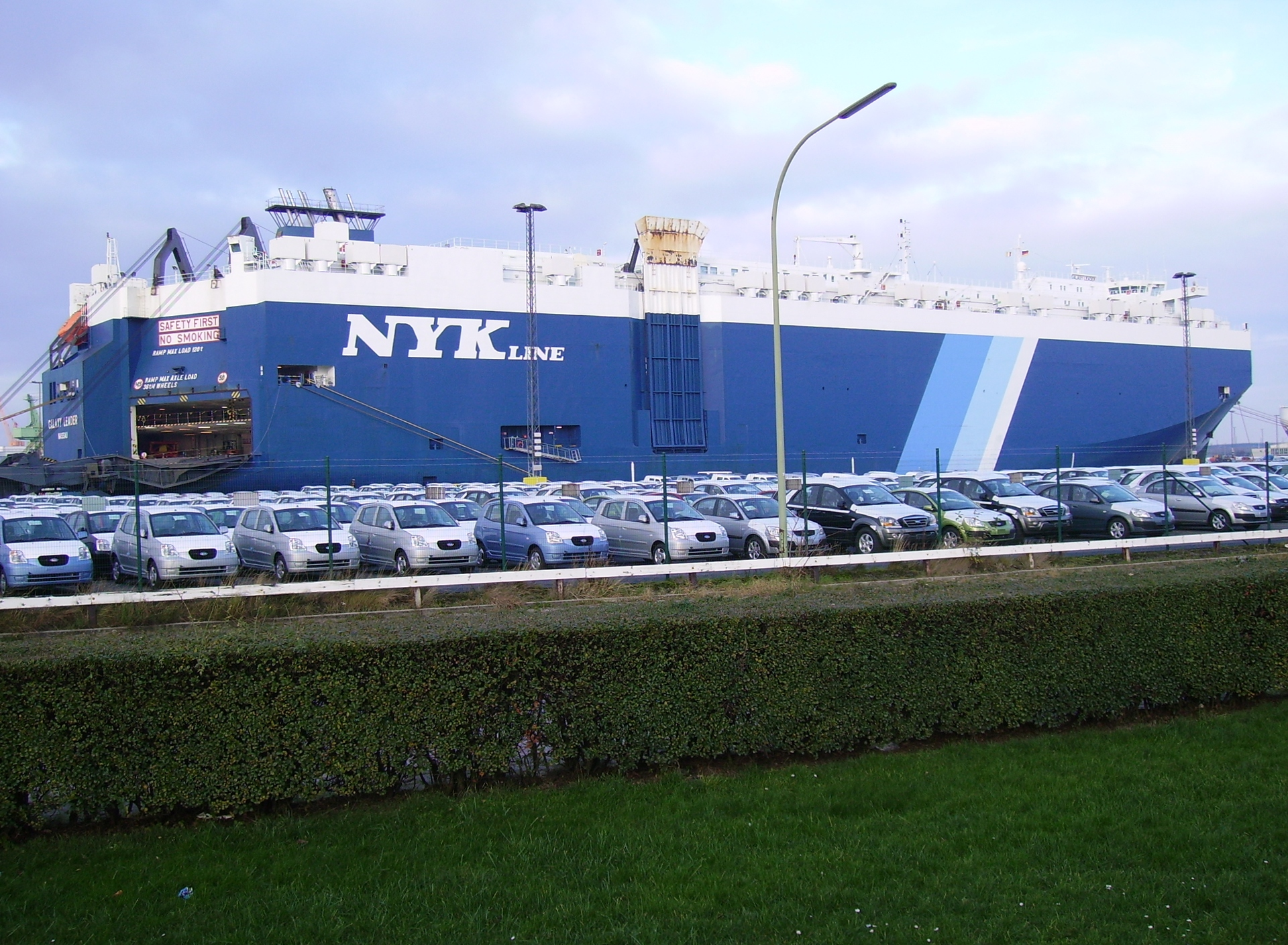
Galaxy Leader at Bremerhaven, 2006. She was hijacked by the Houthis in November 2023.

On 19 November 2023, Houthi forces used a Mil Mi-17 helicopter to board and seize the car transporter Galaxy Leader, which was en route to India with 25 people but no cargo on board. The incident followed a statement by Houthi spokesman Yahya Saree on the group's Telegram channel, declaring their intention to target ships owned or operated by Israeli companies or carrying the Israeli flag. According to the ship's owner, the vessel was then moved to the Yemeni port of Hodeidah. Sarea also urged countries to remove their citizens from crews of such ships. Earlier, Houthi leader Abdul-Malik al-Houthi had threatened further attacks against Israeli interests, including potential targets in the Red Sea and the Bab-el-Mandeb Strait. His speech emphasized the group's capability to monitor and target Israeli ships in these regions.

On 24 November, Iran allegedly attacked CMA CGM Symi, a Malta-flagged container ship in the Indian Ocean A drone was shot down over the Red Sea by an IDF fighter jet.

On 26 November, the Liberian-flagged MV Central Park, an oil tanker managed by Zodiac Maritime, was seized off the coast of Yemen in the Gulf of Aden. It carried a full cargo of phosphoric acid with 22 crew members consisting of Russian, Vietnamese, Bulgarian, Indian, Georgian and Filipino nationals. The destroyer USS Mason, along with a partner country in the multilateral anti-piracy operation CTF 151, conducted a visit, board, search, and seizure (VBSS) operation that facilitated the release of the Central Park and captured the hijackers on the ship following their attempted escape. The ship's crew was unharmed. The US military reported that in the early morning hours of the following day, two ballistic missiles were fired in the direction of the Mason and the Central Park from Houthi territory in Yemen and ended up in the Gulf of Aden. The five hijackers, all suspected Somali pirates, were detained by the US Navy.

On 3 December, the United States Navy Arleigh Burke-class destroyer USS Carney reportedly shot down three attack drones launched from Yemen that were approaching the ship. After shooting down the drones, the ship responded to a distress call by three commercial ships in the area (the Unity Explorer, Number 9 and Sophie II) which were under attack by ballistic missiles launched from Yemen.

The Houthis claimed responsibility for two of the attacks. Houthi military spokesman Brigadier General Yahya Saree stated that one merchant vessel was hit by a missile and another by a drone while in the Bab el-Mandeb strait, without mentioning a warship. A Pentagon source said that the attacks on Carney caused no injuries or damage.

=== Third phase (December 2023 – May 2024) ===
On 9 December 2023, the Houthis vowed to target any vessel en route to Israeli ports, entering the third phase of the crisis. Following the announcement, the frequency of attacks around the Bab-el-Mandeb increased.

On 12 December, the Houthis launched an anti-ship cruise missile attack against the Norwegian commercial ship Strinda, an oil and chemical tanker operated by the J. Ludwig Mowinckels Rederi company, while it was close to the Bab-el-Mandeb. The Strinda was on its way from Malaysia to Italy (via the Suez Canal). The attack caused a fire aboard the ship; no crew members were injured. The ship was carrying cargo of palm oil. The French Armed Forces Ministry and US Department of Defense reported that the Languedoc shot down a drone targeted at the Strinda, and USS Mason also rendered aid. The Houthi attack on the Strinda was an expansion of its series of attacks against maritime shipping in the strait; the Houthis began to attack commercial vessels without any discernible tie to Israel.

On 13 December, Houthi rebels attempted to board the Ardmore Encounter, a Marshall Islands-flagged commercial tanker coming from Mangaluru, India and en route to either Rotterdam, Netherlands or Gävle, Sweden, but failed, prompting a distress call from the ship. They then targeted the tanker with missiles, which missed. USS Mason responded to the tanker's distress call and shot down a UAV launched from a Houthi-controlled area. The Ardmore Encounter was able to continue its voyage without further incident.

On 14 December, a Houthi-launched missile was fired at the Maersk Gibraltar, though it missed its target. On 15 December, Houthi spokesperson Yahya Sarea claimed responsibility for attacks on two Liberian-flagged vessels identified as MSC Alanya and MSC Palatium III. The Houthis fired naval missiles at the ships as they alleged they were traveling to Israel.

On 15 December, it was reported that the Liberian-flagged Al-Jasrah, which is owned by Hapag Lloyd, caught fire after being hit by a Houthi-launched projectile while sailing through the Bab el-Mandeb Strait. On 16 December, Royal Navy destroyer HMS Diamond shot down a drone over the Red Sea while it was targeting a commercial ship.

On 18 December, Houthis claimed to have launched attacks targeting two cargo vessels in the Red Sea near Mocha port, the MSC Clara and the Norwegian-owned Swan Atlantic. The Swan Atlantic's owner, Inventor Chemical Tankers, said its water tank was damaged in the attack and denied it has any Israeli ties.

On 23 December, Houthis fired two anti-ship ballistic missiles into the southern Red Sea, but no ships were hit. USS Laboon also shot down four UAVs that were heading toward it.

On 26 December, Houthis fired several naval missiles at the MSC United VIII in the Red Sea after it rejected three warning calls. She reported several explosions near her. She alerted a nearby coalition task force warship and engaged in evasive maneuvers as per her instructions during the attacks.

The container ship Maersk Hangzhou, owned by A.P. Moller Singapore Pte. Ltd. and in service with Maersk Line, was attacked over two days in late December. On 30 December, she was hit by a land-based missile, suffering only limited damage and no casualties. The following day, four small Yemeni gunboats attempted to attack and board the ship. The Maersk Hangzhou's own security team repelled them. Responding to her distress call, helicopters were deployed from USS Dwight D. Eisenhower and USS Gravely, which were then engaged by the Houthis. The helicopters returned fire and sank three of the boats, killing their crews (ten militants in all—the fourth boat withdrew), thus inflicting the first known casualties of the Red Sea crisis.

On 11 January 2024, Houthis fired an anti-ship ballistic missile into international shipping lanes in the Gulf of Aden, which landed in the water near a commercial vessel, causing no damage or injuries.

On 12 January, Houthis mistakenly targeted MT Khalissa as it carried Russian crude oil based on outdated information linking it to the United Kingdom. A missile was fired near the vessel as it sailed off the coast of Aden, causing no injuries or damage. Three small boats also tailed the vessel for over an hour.

On 15 January, Houthis struck MV Gibraltar Eagle with an anti-ship missile, causing a small fire on board. The attack did not cause injuries or significant damage. Another missile fired earlier failed in flight and crashed in Yemen.

On 16 January, an anti-ship ballistic missile fired by the Houthis struck MV Zografia, causing material damage but no injuries. The Greek-owned and Malta-flagged vessel, which came from Vietnam and was en route to Israel, was able to continue transiting the Red Sea.

On 17 January, Houthis struck the US-owned bulk carrier MV Genco Picardy with a drone while it traversed the Gulf of Aden, causing minimal damage and no injuries to the crew. The Indian Navy announced the following day that INS Visakhapatnam was diverted to rescue the ship's crew of 22 people. No casualties were reported and the ship later continued onwards for its scheduled journey.

On 18 January, Houthis launched two anti-ship ballistic missiles at MV Chem Ranger, which was traveling from Jeddah, Saudi Arabia to Kuwait. The missiles landed in the water near the ship while it was traversing through the Gulf of Aden, and there was no reported damage or injuries. However, a Houthi post on social media claimed that they launched several naval missiles at the vessel, resulting in direct hits.

On 22 January, Houthis claimed they attacked the US military cargo ship MV Ocean Jazz, but did not state the location of the attack or if damage was caused. However, the claim was rejected by the US Naval Forces Central Command.

On 24 January, a Houthi missile exploded on the sea about 100 metres off the starboard side of the US-flagged, -owned, and -operated container ship Maersk Detroit. This ship and the Maersk Chesapeake, both in the US Maritime Administration's Maritime Security Program and Voluntary Intermodal Sealift Agreement were carrying US Department of Defense, US Department of State, USAID, and other US government agency cargo from Oman, and accompanied by US naval vessels while they were near the Bab el-Mandeb Strait transiting north. Two other missiles were shot down by USS Gravely. Following the incident, the two vessels were ordered back to the Gulf of Aden by US Navy instruction with Navy escort and Maersk Line Limited, a subsidiary that sails primarily US government-owned goods, suspended all sailings in the Red Sea.

On 26 January, a Houthi ballistic missile fired toward USS Carney was shot down. The same day, the Marlin Luanda, an oil tanker operated by British company Oceonix Services on behalf of Trafigura, carrying Russian-produced naphtha, was hit by a missile as it traversed the Gulf of Aden 60 nautical miles (110 km; 69 mi) southeast of Aden, according to UK Maritime Trade Operations. The missile set fire to a starboard cargo tank, which was extinguished by the crew without injury.

On 28 January, HMS Diamond intercepted a Houthi drone targeting it. The following day, Houthis claimed they struck USS Lewis B. Puller with a missile in the Gulf of Aden. An American defense official rejected the claim. The UKMTO reported the same day that a merchant vessel was suspiciously approached by three small boats, who got as close as one nautical mile, 44 nautical miles (81 km; 51 mi) west of Al-Mukha. The merchant vessel's security crew fired warning shots to deter the small boats, and the vessel was able to safely proceed to its next port of call.

On 30 January, a Houthi missile targeting USS Gravely came within a mile of the naval vessel before being intercepted, the closest any Houthi attack had yet come to a US warship. The following day, the Houthis claimed they targeted an American merchant ship named Koi with several naval missiles. The security firm Ambrey said the same day that a merchant vessel reported an explosion on its starboard side 69 nautical miles (128 km; 79 mi) southwest of Aden, but it was not stated if it was the Koi. USS Carney also shot down three Iranian drones and one Houthi missile over the Gulf of Aden.

On 6 February, Houthis claimed they hit a British and an American ship in the Red Sea, which they identified as the Morning Tide and Star Nasia, respectively. Neither ship received major damage. Ambrey reported that a Barbados-flagged British ship received minor damage to its port 57 nautical miles (106 km; 66 mi) from the coast of Hodeidah, and the UKMTO said that it also received reports that the port side of a ship was struck by a projectile west of Hodeidah and a small craft was seen nearby. The second ship, which the UKMTO identified as a Marshall Islands-flagged, Greek-owned vessel originating from the US and en route to India, was attacked off the coast of Aden. It reported an explosion 50 metres off its starboard side.

On 12 February, Houthis fired two missiles at the Star Iris as it traveled south of the Bab el-Mandeb strait, claiming it was an American vessel without providing evidence. The attack caused minor damage to the vessel, but no injuries were reported. The Star Iris came from Brazil and was en route to Bandar Khomeini, Iran. It was able to proceed to its next port of call.

On 16 February, the UKMTO reported that a missile lightly damaged a Panama-flagged ship off the coast of Mokha. Houthis later claimed responsibility for the attack, identifying the tanker as the Pollux and claiming they targeted it with a "large number of appropriate naval missiles". The US Department of State said the tanker was bound for India and was struck on its port side by a missile fired from Yemen.

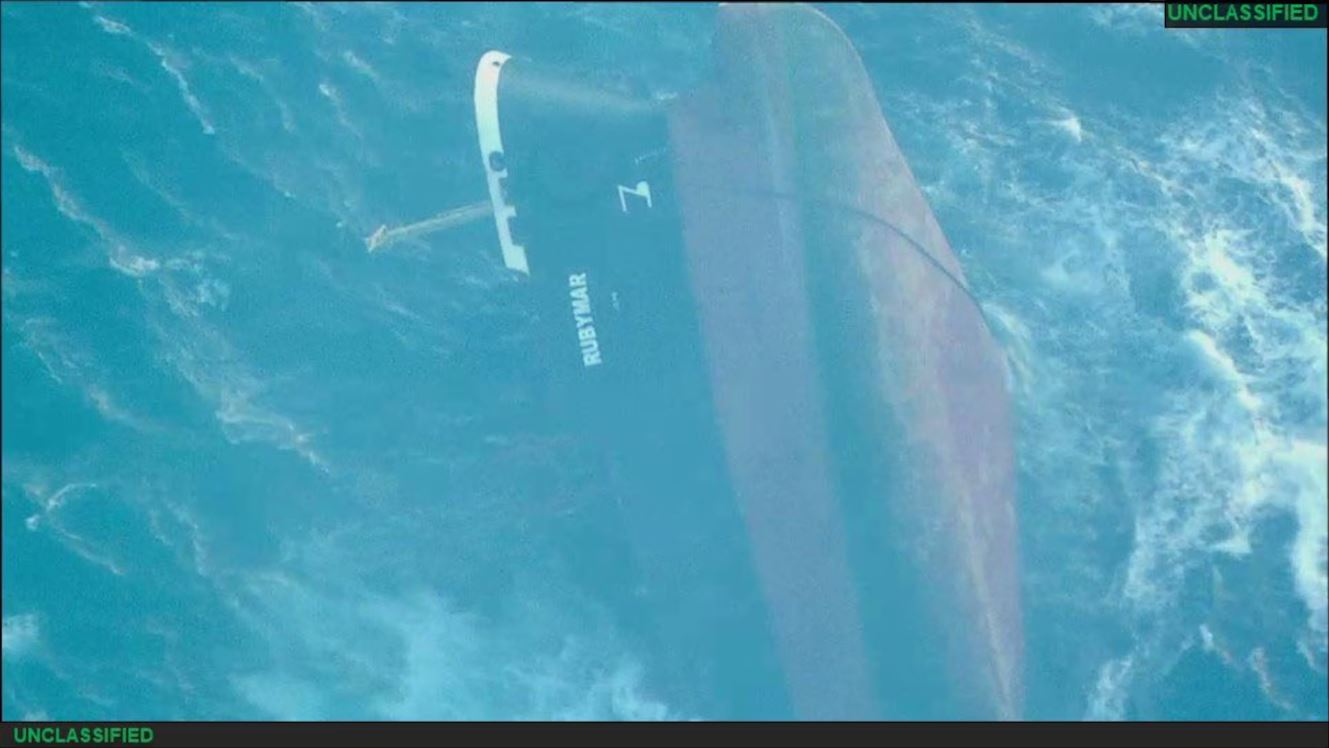
MV Rubymar sinks in the Red Sea on 2 March 2024

On 18 February, the Belize-flagged cargo ship MV Rubymar was attacked in the Bab el-Mandeb strait as she sailed from Khor Fakkan, UAE, to Varna, Bulgaria. Saree said the attack caused catastrophic damage to the vessel, forced her to stop, and put her at risk of sinking. The vessel's crew evacuated after the attack. Ambrey said the attack made the ship briefly slow down and deviate from her course, before contacting the Djiboutian Navy and returning to her previous course and speed. The vessel remained afloat as of 8 am London time. CENTCOM said the attack on the Rubymar caused her to slowly take in water and leave behind a 29-kilometre (18 mi) oil slick, causing an environmental disaster. It added that she was carrying 41,000 tonnes of fertilizer, which could spill into the sea if she were to sink. On 2 March, the Yemeni government reported that the Rubymar had sunk.

On 19 February, a Greece-flagged bulk carrier requested military assistance after a missile attack east of Aden. Houthis claimed responsibility for the attack, identifying the vessel as the Sea Champion. They added that another vessel called Navis Fortuna was also struck.

On 22 February, Houthis fired two missiles at the cargo ship MV Islander as she traversed the Red Sea, causing a fire. CENTCOM announced that damage was done to the vessel and one person suffered minor injuries as a result of the attacks.

On 6 March, the Houthis struck the Barbados-flagged bulk carrier True Confidence with an anti-ship missile, igniting a fire and leading the crew to abandon the vessel. Three crew members were killed and four others sustained serious burns from the fire. INS Kolkata handled the situation. The event happened 55 nautical miles to the southwest of Aden. INS Kolkata deployed its boats and onboard helicopter to reach the location and deployed life rafts to save 21 crew members, one of whom was Indian. The ship's medical professionals provided vital medical attention to the injured crew members.

On 8 March, the Houthis launched a large attack on US warships and commercial shipping, firing two anti-ship missiles at the Singapore-flagged bulk carrier MV Propel Fortune and 37 drones at American naval vessels. A French warship and fighter jets shot down four drones approaching vessels belonging to Operation Aspides; the Danish frigate Iver Huitfeldt shot down another four; and the US Navy intercepted another 15.

On 14 March, reports that missiles had struck the Panama-flagged Pacific 01 in the Gulf of Aden were debunked. The following day, Houthis threatened to expand attacks to include Israel-linked vessels passing through the Indian Ocean towards the Cape of Good Hope. On the same day, Yahya Saree claimed that Houthi forces launched drones and anti-ship missiles at American and Israeli vessels in the Indian Ocean, while also targeting US naval vessels with drones.

On 24 March, Houthis targeted the Chinese-owned and Panama-flagged oil tanker MV Huang Pu with six anti-ship ballistic missiles as she was en route to New Mangalore Port, India. One of the missiles landed in Yemen, while four others struck in the vicinity of the vessel and the fifth directly struck her, causing a fire which was extinguished thirty minutes later. She was carrying Russian crude oil at the time of the attack, and was previously owned by a British shipping firm.

On 7 April, the Houthis claimed responsibility for attacks on three commercial vessels and two US frigates in the Red Sea and Indian Ocean. They identified the commercial vessels as the British-owned, Marshall Islands-flagged Hope Island and the Israeli-owned, Panama-flagged MSC Grace F and MSC Gina.

On 9 April, the Maersk Yorktown, a US-flagged and owned container ship which was being escorted by the destroyers USS Mason and USS Laboon at the time, was targeted by an anti-ship missile while traversing the Gulf of Aden. The missile was intercepted before it could cause damage. The following day, the Houthis claimed responsibility for the attack on the Yorktown and announced that they targeted the vessels MSC Gina and MSC Darwin, which they claimed were Israeli, and a US destroyer in the Gulf of Aden.

On 24 April, Maersk Yorktown was again targeted while underway the Gulf of Aden, along with the Madeira-flagged, Swiss-owned MSC Veracruz. Each was attacked in the Indian Ocean by Iranian-backed Houthi militants.

On 26 April, two Houthi missiles hit the Panama-flagged oil tanker Andromeda Star, causing minor damage, approximately 15 nautical miles (28 km; 17 mi) southwest of Mokha. The Houthis claimed she was a British oil ship. She had been carrying Russian oil from Primorsk, Russia to Vadinar, India. INS Kochi rescued 30 crew members on board the ship. An official reconnaissance was conducted by a helicopter after which the explosive ordnance disposal (EOD) reached the vessel to "residual risk assessment". Later the ship continued towards her next destination. Another missile landed in close proximity to the nearby Antigua and Barbuda-flagged MV Maisha, causing no damage.

On 29 April, Houthis attacked the Malta-flagged merchant vessel MV Cyclades with anti-ship missiles and UAVs, causing minor damage. The Houthis also claimed responsibility for a drone attack on the Portugal-flagged MSC Orion that day, directly striking her around 600 kilometres (370 mi) off the coast of Yemen while she was in the Arabian Sea, making it the furthest attack by the Houthis so far. In response to the increased range, the EU's Operation Atalanta advised for an alternative shipping route to be established at least 150 nautical miles (280 km; 170 mi) east of the current route.

=== Fourth phase (May – July 2024) ===
In early May 2024, in what he described as the "fourth stage" of the attacks, Houthi leader Abdul Malik al-Houthi vowed to attack ships of any company related to Israel or carrying goods for Israel in response to Israel's Rafah offensive in southern Gaza.

On 9 May, the Houthis claimed responsibility for attacks on three Panama-flagged container ships. In the first attack, two explosions were reported near a ship in the morning of 7 May. The Houthis said that the explosions were missile attacks targeting MSC Gina and MSC Diego. They also claimed an attack on the MSC Vittoria in the Indian Ocean, but this was unacknowledged by any authorities.

On 18 May, the Greek-owned and Panama-flagged oil tanker MT Wind was struck by a missile off the coast of Mokha. On 24 May, the Houthis claimed to have attacked the bulk carrier Yannis in the Red Sea, the gas tanker Essex in the Mediterranean Sea and the MSC Alexandra in the Arabian Sea. The U.S. Central Command stated that the Houthis fired two anti-ship ballistic missiles into the Red Sea, but no injuries or damages were reported, while Essex's manager Zodiac Maritime stated that it found no sign of it being struck. The Greek-owned and Marshall Islands-flagged bulk carrier Laax was struck by Houthis on 28 May. The group also claimed to have targeted the ships Morea and Sealady in the Red Sea, Alba and Maersk Hartford in the Arabian Sea and Minerva Antonia in the Mediterranean Sea. Maersk Line, the owner of Maersk Hartford, but denied any attack on the ship.

On 1 June, the Houthis targeted the Maltese-flagged oil tanker Abliani in the Red Sea, the Maltese-flagged cargo ship Maina once in the Red Sea and then in the Arabian Sea, and the Marshall Islands-flagged LNG carrier Al Oraiq in the Indian Ocean on 1 June. The US Central Command said that no casualties or damage were reported.

On 5 June, the Houthis claimed to have attacked the Liberian-flagged bulk carriers Roza and Vantage Dream in the Red Sea with missiles and drones, accusing the two ships of entering Israeli ports. They also claimed an attack on the US-flagged vessel Maersk Seletar in the Arabian Sea using drones, its media relations manager however denied that the vessel had been attacked. None of the Houthi claims matched with reports from maritime security agencies, with only the UK Maritime Trade Operations reporting an explosion near the Maersk Seletar in the Red Sea a few days earlier.

The Houthis on 7 June claimed to have targeted the Malta-flagged container ship Elbella and the Cyprus-flagged cargo ship AAL Genoa in the Red Sea with ballistic and naval missiles as well as drones, but there was no independent confirmation of the attacks. The U.S. Central Command reported that the group had launched four anti-ship ballistic missiles towards the Red Sea over the past day, with no casualties or damage being reported.

The Antigua and Barbuda-flagged and German-owned cargo ship Norderney was struck by Houthi anti-ship ballistic missiles twice on 8 and 9 June in the Gulf of Aden. The Liberian-flagged and Swiss-owned container ship MSC Tavvishi was struck by Houthi missiles in the Gulf of Aden on 8 June as well. Both ships were damaged, with a small fire breaking out on the Norderney, but none of the crew were hurt. An unidentified ship was also struck by Houthi missiles near Djibouti on 9 June, but no casualty was reported.

On 12 June, the Liberian-flagged and Greek-owned cargo ship Tutor was struck twice in the Red Sea near Al Hudaydah. The Houthis stated that attacks were carried out using ballistic missiles, drones and unmanned surface vehicle (USV), their first successful use of such a device throughout the crisis. The ship began to take in water, and the Houthis claimed that she was susceptible to sinking. The ship was abandoned by the crew who were evacuated, save for one member who was confirmed missing and was suspected to be trapped in the engine room. Its sinking was confirmed on 19 June, with the missing crew member believed to have been killed.

On 13 June, two cruise missiles launched by the Houthis struck the Palauan-flagged and Ukrainian-owned bulk cargo carrier Verbena in the Gulf of Aden, causing damage and subsequent fires on board. The attacks also severely injured an American sailor who was evacuated by U.S. forces. The Houthis also claimed attacks on the Malta-flagged bulk carrier Seaguardian and Athina in the Red Sea. The attacks could not be independently confirmed though the United Kingdom Maritime Trade Operations (UKMTO) reported an explosion near an unnamed vessel in the Red Sea, without causing any damage or casualties.

On 16 June, the Houthis claimed to have targeted the ships Captain Paris and Happy Condor with missiles and drones respectively. An unidentified vessel traveling south of Mokha reported two explosions near it without suffering damage or casualties according to the UKMTO.

The Palauan-flagged LNG carrier Asya Energy managed to sail through the Red Sea without any incident on 18 June, marking the first time a LNG carrier had sailed successfully through the Bab-el-Mandeb since January 2024. Leading shipping associations meanwhile called for immediate action to safeguard ships passing through the Red Sea on the following day. Marine war insurance agency Vessel Protect stated that the Houthis had carried out ten strikes in June and five in May.

The Houthis targeted a commercial ship in the Gulf of Aden on 21 June according to the UKMTO center said and the Joint Maritime Information Cente, with no casualties or damage being reported. The Houthis on the next day identified it as the Liberian-flagged bulk carrier Transworld Navigator and stated that they had targeted it with ballistic missiles. They also claimed to have targeted the Shorthorn Express in the Mediterranean Sea, but there was no independent confirmation of the attack.

The Houthis targeted the Transworld Navigator again on 23 June using a USV in the Red Sea, with the crew reporting minor injuries and moderate damage to the ship. The group also claimed to have targeted the Stolt Sequoia in the Indian Ocean with cruise missiles. The Liberian-flagged container ship MSC Sarah V reported a missile attack near it on 24 June while traveling in the Arabian Sea, without sustaining any damage or injuries to the crew. The Houthis stated that they had targeted it with their newly acquired hypersonic missile called Hatem 2.

The UKMTO on 26 June stated that a merchant ship reported a missile hitting the water nearby while it was passing near Aden, with the crew reported to be safe. The Houthis meanwhile claimed that they targeted the Portuguese-flagged container ship MSC Manzanillo docked in Haifa in a joint operation with the Islamic Resistance in Iraq, although the IDF denied the claim. A commercial ship reported being targeted by a USV near Al Hudaydah without suffering any damages or injuries to its crew on 27 June according to the UKMTO and Ambrey.

On 28 June, the Liberian-flagged oil tanker Delonix was targeted by five missiles to the northwest of Al Hudaydah but escaped unharmed according to the UKMTO, although the Houthis claimed that it took a direct hit. The group also claimed to have targeted the bulk carrier Ioannis in the Red Sea, as well as the oil tanker Waler and the container ship Johannes Maersk in the Mediterranean Sea.

The Houthis on 1 July claimed to have again targeted the Delonix in the Red Sea, in addition to targeting MSC Unific in the Arabian Sea, the British sealift ship Anvil Point in the Indian Ocean and the Lucky Sailor in the Mediterranean Sea. None of the attacks could be confirmed however.

The American-flagged container ship Maersk Sentosa on 9 July reported an explosion nearby while passing through Nishtun, although reporting no injuries or damages. The Houthis claimed the attack and stated that they had carried it out using ballistic and wing missiles. The group also claimed to have attacked the Maltese-flagged container ship Marathoplis in the Arabian Sea and the Liberian-flagged MSC Patnaree III in the Gulf of Aden using UAVs.

The Liberian-flagged tanker Mount Fuji reported an explosion near it on 10 July while travelling in through the Bab-el-Mandeb strait, with the Houthis being suspected to be behind it. The ship and the crew were reported to be safe. Abdul Malik al-Houthi meanwhile on 11 July claimed that his group had attacked 166 ships associated with Israel, the U.S. and the U.K since November 2023.

A merchant ship near Mokha reported one missile hitting the water near it and another exploding in the air on 11 July. The UKMTO later reported that two additional explosions had occurred near it during the day. The Houthis on 12 July claimed to have targeted a ship called Charysalis twice in the Red Sea and Bab-el-Mandeb strait. Xinhua News Agency however stated that no such ship by the name existed, and the closest match was the Liberian-flagged oil tanker Chrysalis which was last reported to be in the Red Sea. The Houthis on 14 July claimed to have targeted the MSC Unific with ballistic missiles and UAVs.

On 15 July, the Houthis targeted the Panama-flagged product tanker Bentley I and the Liberian-flagged crude oil tanker Chios Lion in the Red Sea with ballistic missiles, UAVs and USVs. The Bentley I was reported by the UKMTO to have been hit twice by a USV without it exploding, while two manned boats fired at it, resulting in a gunfight before the boats withdrew. The tanker later reported four missile explosions near it. The Chios Lion meanwhile reported sustaining damage due to being struck by a USV to the northwest of Al Hudaydah according to the UKMTO. The Houthis also claimed to have targeted the Cyprus-flagged clean product tanker Olvia in the Mediterranean Sea alongside the Islamic Resistance in Iraq, the managers of the ship however denied the claim. The group stated that the attacks were carried out in retaliation foe the Israeli attack on Al-Mawasi on 13 July.

The Singapore-flagged container ship Lobivia was reported to have been struck while transiting through the Gulf of Aden on 19 July, causing a fire onboard which was extinguished by its crew who were reported to be safe. The Houthis took responsibility, stating that they targeted the ship with ballistic missiles and drones.

The Liberian-flagged container ship Pumba was targeted by a UAV and a USV near Mokha on 20 July, causing slight damage. The Houthis claimed the attack and stated that they targeted the ship with ballistic missiles and drones.

=== Fifth phase (July – December 2024) ===
The Houthis declared their successful drone attack on Tel Aviv in July 2024 as the beginning of the fifth phase of their attacks.

The Liberian-flagged cargo ship Groton was hit by a missile on 3 August while sailing east of Aden, but received no damage and all crew members were reported to be safe. The Houthis stated that they had targeted it with ballistic missiles.

The Houthis on 7 August claimed to have hit the Liberian-flagged container ship Contship Ono while it was travelling through the Red Sea, after targeting it with UAVs and ballistic missiles. Its owner Contships Management however denied the claim and stated that the ship as well as its crew were safe.

The Liberian-flagged oil tanker Delta Blue was attacked twice by Houthis near Mokha on 8 August, with militants in two boats first firing a rocket-propelled grenade, and later a missile targeting the ship. Both the projectiles exploded nearby in the water. On the following day, it was targeted by a USV which was destroyed by its security team before it could hit the ship. Another missile later targeted the ship but landed in the nearby water. Both the ship and its crew were reported to be unharmed following the attacks.

Two ships were targeted in the Red Sea on 13 August. The first ship to be targeted was the Liberian-flagged oil tanker Delta Atlantica, which reported two explosions near it before being targeted by another explosion after a small watercraft flashed lights at it. The ship was attacked again a few hours later, being targeted by a USV which hit the ship but did not detonate, and was destroyed by its security guards. The second ship to be attacked was the Panama-flagged crude oil tanker On Phoenix which reported an explosion nearby. Both the ships and their crew were reported to be safe.

On 21 August, the Greek-flagged oil tanker Sounion was attacked multiple times to the west of Al Hudaydah. It was first attacked by two boats and was hit by multiple projectiles, with a brief gunbattle breaking out. Another attack occurred later, causing a fire and loss of engine power. The crew meanwhile however was reported to be safe and was rescued on the following day by a French destroyer which was part of Operation Aspides. The Houthis claimed the attack and later attacked the ship again, publishing a video of the group purportedly setting it on fire. The United States Department of Defense stated on 28 August that the ship was still on fire and had likely started leaking oil, while those attempting to salvage it were prevented from doing so due to the Houthis threatening to attack them as well. The Operation Aspides mission however denied that there was any oil leakage. The office of the Permanent Representative of Iran to the United Nations later stated that the group had agreed to let salvage crews rescue the tanker. The Houthis on the following day published a video of them setting off bombs on the tanker. The tanker was successfully towed to a safe area without any oil spill on 16 September and salvaged by 10 January 2025.

Five explosions were meanwhile also reported on 21 August near the Panama-flagged bulk carrier SW North Wind I, which was sailing near Aden. None of the blasts however affected the ship or its crew. The ship was attacked again on the following day by a USV and two skiffs carrying armed men, with an explosion causing minor damage to the ship after the USV rammed it. The Houthis claimed the attack.

UKMTO stated on 26 August that a commercial ship reported being approached by a small boat with men and a ladder onboard while sailing to the southeast of Aden, but it turned back after being challenged by the ship's security team. Another ship sailing southeast of Mokha later reported sighting a USV and two small boats without being approached. Ambrey meanwhile reported an incident to the southwest of Aden. The chemical tanker Mutriba reported sighting a USV and three small boats on the following day while sailing west of Mokha.

On 30 August, two missiles exploded near the cargo ship Groton which was sailing east of Aden, with both the ship and its crew reported to be safe. The Houthis took responsibility for the attack and stated that they had carried it out using missiles, naval forces and UAVs.

On 2 September, the Houthis attacked the Panama-flagged crude oil tanker Blue Lagoon I, northwest of As-Salif. The Joint Maritime Information Center meanwhile stated that Blue Lagoon I was hit with two ballistic missiles, with a third exploding nearby; however, the crew was reported to be safe. Ambrey reported later that day that a second ship was hit by a UAV. The US Central Command identified it as the Saudi-flagged crude oil tanker Amjad, adding that there were neither casualties nor damage. The ship management company Bahri, owners of Amjad, but denied that it had been targeted.

On 1 October, the Houthis targeted the Panama-flagged oil tanker Cordelia Moon to the northwest of Al Hudaydah, their first attack on commercial ship in a month. Like the Andromeda Star the previous April, Houthis had mistaken a second ship managed by Margao Marine Solutions as a British vessel. The ship was first targeted with four missiles fired from a remotely piloted watercraft which hit the water near it, before being struck by a USV which damaged its port side. Its crew however was reported to be safe. The Houthis stated that they had targeted the ship with eight ballistic and winged missiles, a UAV and USV, causing severe damage. The Liberian-flagged bulk carrier Minoan Courage which was sailing near the Cordelia Moon was also struck by a Houthi missile on 1 October and damaged in the attack, with its crew was reported to be safe. The Houthis however did not claim the attack, with the Combined Maritime Forces concluding that it was unintentionally hit while the group was attacking the Cordelia Moon. The Houthis meanwhile claimed to have struck the Marathopolis in the Arabian Sea with a UAV.

On 10 October, the Liberian-flagged tanker Olympic Spirit was targeted by the Houthis near Al Hudaydah. The tanker was first struck by a projectile, and later two projectiles landed in the water near it. The ship received minor damage, but no fire or casualties were reported. The Houthis stated that they had targeted the ship with eleven ballistic missiles and two drones.

On 18 October, the Houthis claimed to have targeted the Maltese-flagged container ship Megalopolis in the Arabian Sea using drones. None of the maritime security agencies however reported any incident occurring in relation to the ship.

The Houthis on 29 October targeted the Liberian-flagged bulk carrier Motaro south of Mokha, but it managed to escape unharmed with three explosions taking place near it. The group also claimed to have attacked two other Liberian-flagged vessels, namely the SC Montreal and Maersk Kowloon, but the attacks could not be independently confirmed. On 19 November, the Houthis targeted the Panama-flagged dry cargo ship Anadolu S pwned by a Turkish company, with two missiles landing near it. The group claimed to have successfully struck the vessel with ballistic and naval missiles.

The crew of the Panamanian-flagged cargo ship ISA Star was evacuated by the French frigate Languedoc operating under Operation Aspides on 5 December, after their ship was damaged and began leaking oil northwest of Al Hudaydah. The maritime authorities in Djibouti claimed that the vessel was attacked, but none of the Western maritime agencies confirmed this, with most of them stating that it suffered an internal problem. The Houthis also did not claim any attack. The group on 27 December claimed to have successfully struck the Denmark-flagged container ship Santa Ursula with UAVs while it was transiting east of Socotra through the Arabian Sea. Its owner Maersk however denied that the ship was targeted.

=== First ceasefire and resumption (January 2025 – September 2025) ===
Commercial ships associated with the US and the UK returned to the Red Sea in late-January 2025 after the Houthis announced a partial cessation of their attacks on commercial shipping following the 2025 Gaza war ceasefire.

On 6 July, the Liberian-flagged, Greek-owned bulk carrier Magic Seas was fired at by eight skiffs with small arms and RPGs, and was later attacked by four USVs; two of which impacted the port side while the other two were destroyed by the vessel's guards. The attack took place near Al Hudaydah. The ship caught fire, with its crew being rescued by UAE. The Houthis later claimed responsibility for the attack, stating that they attacked it with two USVs, five ballistic and cruise missiles, and three UAVs, causing the ship to sink into the sea. This was the first attack by the group on a commercial ship since November 2024. The Houthis said the ship was sunk after the attack, and later published a video that purportedly showed fighters boarding the ship before detonating explosives on it, causing it to sink.

On 7 July, another Liberian-flagged, Greek owned bulk carrier named Eternity C was attacked with UAVs and four RPGs fired by four speedboats near Al Hudaydah. The UAVs struck the vessel's bridge, with four crew members being killed and at least two being wounded. The vessel was again attacked by two USVs on 8 July per two security sources, forcing its crew and guards to abandon it, and sank the following morning. The Houthis took responsibility for attacking the ship, stating that they targeted it with a USV and six ballistic and cruise missiles, while also publishing a video purportedly showing their fighters attacking the ship. Ten of the crew members were rescued, while 11 remained missing, with the United Nations and the US accusing the Houthis of abducting them. The group claimed that they rescued them after receiving a distress call.

On 31 August, an explosion occurred near the Liberian-flagged, Israeli-owned chemical tanker Scarlet Ray near Yanbu, Saudi Arabia. The ship and its crew were unharmed. The Houthis later took responsibility for the attack, claiming that it was directly struck by a ballistic missile. On 2 September, the Houthis claimed that they struck the container ship MSC Aby with two UAVs and a missile. No incidents were reported near the named vessel, which successfully arrived to its destination in Jeddah. On 4 September, an unknown projectile hit the water near a ship sailing northwest of Hodeidah.

On 23 September, a projectile landed near the Dutch cargo ship Minervagracht sailing east of Aden. On 29 September, the vessel was struck by a Houthi cruise missile in the Gulf of Aden, injuring two Filipino sailors, including one who succumbed to their wounds on 6 October, and causing a fire. The ship's 19 crew members were later evacuated via helicopter. The Houthis claimed responsibility for the attack on 30 September, describing it as a response to Israel's actions in the Gaza Strip. The Joint Maritime Information Center said that the vessel had "no Israeli affiliations". The same day, the Houthis warned that they would target vessels belonging to 13 American oil exporting companies.

=== Second ceasefire (October 2025 – July 2026) ===
Following the implementation of the ceasefire in the Gaza Strip in October 2025, the Houthis paused their attacks on commercial ships.

Maersk Line resumed shipping through the Red Sea in January 2026, with successive successful trans-Suez crossings by Maersk Sebarok and Maersk Denver. Warning shots were fired on 17 February as a vessel transiting southwest of Aden was approached by a skiff according to the UKMTO, which advised vessels in the area to exercise caution.

After the Houthis resumed their attacks on Israel amidst the 2026 Iran war in March 2026, the group threatened to close the Bab-el-Mandeb again if the conflict against Iran or Lebanon escalated, or if the Gulf Arab states joined the war against Iran.

A vessel was approached near Hodeidah by a skiff carrying armed men on 12 April according to UKMTO, with the men attempting to board the vessel. The skiff however turned away after the ship's captain deployed a flare. The UKMTO reported on 23 May that it received multiple reports of commercial vessels being approached by skiffs in the Gulf of Aden.

The Houthis declared a "ban" on Israeli-affiliated ships transiting the Red Sea on 8 June. A cargo vessel exchanged fire with a small craft carrying six people near Balhaf on 10 June according to the UKMTO. Another cargo vessel reported exchanging fire with armed men in a skiff off the cost of Hodeidah on 5 July according to the UKMTO.

=== Houthi embargo against Saudi Arabia (July 2026 – present) ===
On 20 July, the Houthis announced that they would impose a maritime blockade against Saudi Arabia in response to its blockade of Yemen and a strike on the Sanaa International Airport. On 22 July, the US Navy said that the Houthis had completed preparations for attacks on shipping, planting missiles and drones near the Bab-el-Mandeb. By then, eight tankers linked to Saudi oil exports had diverted due to Houthi threats. Later that day, the UKMTO reported that a tanker in the Red Sea was struck by a projectile southwest of Al Shuqaiq, Saudi Arabia, causing a fire. The Houthis confirmed that they attacked two Saudi oil tankers, which they identified as Encelia and Layla, accusing them of violating their blockade. The Encelia was confirmed to have been struck on its starboard side, while the attack on the Layla was unverified. Despite the embargo, two Chinese supertankers carrying Saudi oil crossed the Bab-el-Mandeb on 23 July. The following day, Saudi tanker NCC MASA was attacked in the Red Sea, causing minor damage. The ship continued to its destination. On 28 July, the Houthis claimed that they fired several ballistic missiles at the Saudi tanker NCC GHAZAL, forcing it to retreat. The EOS Risk Group confirmed that the ship was struck by anti-ship missiles, forcing it to return to port.

On 4 August, the Indian-flagged vessel Faize Noore Oliya was attacked by a USV in Yemeni waters and later sunk. All 14 crew members, including 13 Indians, were rescued by the Yemeni government. No group claimed the attack, however the ship reportedly carried Saudi oil. The following day, the Houthis claimed that they attacked Saudi oil tanker NCC Wafa off Yanbu with ballistic missiles, and another Saudi tanker, Daisy, with a ballistic missile in the Gulf of Aden. According to the JMIC, an explosion occurred between 30 and 40 meters from the Daisy, with shockwaves causing minor damage. On 11 August, an unknown projectile struck the Egyptian-owned small container ship Tihamah in the Bab el-Mandeb, killing one Indonesian and three Pakistani crew members and injuring four others. A second drone strike killed two Yemeni coastguard members attempting to rescue the crew and injured another. The Yemeni government accused the Houthis of conducting three ballistic missile strikes on the ship.

By 19 August, the Houthis said they had targeted eight Saudi tankers since their blockade began—five in the Red Sea and three in the Arabian Sea and Gulf of Aden—while 48 other tankers were forced to divert course. On 24 August, the Houthis said that they struck a ship off Yanbu. Saudi national shipping company Bahri later confirmed that its vessel Amzan was attacked, causing no casualties.

== See also ==
- Red Sea crisis
- International reactions to the Gaza war
- United States support for Israel in the Gaza war
  - Attacks on US bases during the Gaza war
  - Operation Prosperity Guardian
- Closure of the Suez Canal (1967–1975)
- Tanker war - Series of military attacks by Iran and Iraq against merchant vessels in the Persian Gulf and Strait of Hormuz from 1984 to 1988.
- Operation MoLoChKa
- Guanbi policy - A military blockade policy of the government of the Republic of China (ROC) against the Chinese Communist Party (CCP) in the Communist-controlled Zone and later, the newly established People's Republic of China (PRC), with the naval traffic blockade lasting until 12 September 1979 (while the regulation on the vessels, crew and owner companies was abolished on 15 January 1992). The privateering of foreign vessels by the Kuomintang government occurred even in international waters.
