= List of ships sunk by hostile action since World War II =

This is a List of ships sunk by hostile action since World War II. This list contains both civilian vessels and warships sunk or destroyed by enemy or friendly fire. This list does not include ships sank in weapon tests or training exercises.

== List ==
=== 20th Century ===
Ship	Nationality	Date	Conflict	Vector	Ordinance	Notes	Ref
El Amir Farouq	Egypt	28 October 1948	1948 Arab-Israeli War	Warship	Explosive motorboat		
BYMS-class minesweeper	Egypt	28 October 1948	1948 Arab-Israeli War	Warship	Explosive motorboat	Recovered and scrapped	
USS Magpie	United States	1 October 1950	Korean War	Unknown	Naval mine		
USS Pledge	United States	10 October 1950	Korean War	Unknown	Naval mine	Under fire from coastal artillery	
USS Pirate	United States	12 October 1950	Korean War	Unknown	Naval mine	Under fire rom coastal artillery	
USS Partridge	United States	2 February 1951	Korean War	Unknown	Naval mine		
ROKS Dangpo	South Korea	19 January 1967	Korean conflict	Coastal artillery			
INS Eilat	Israel	21 October 1967	War of Attrition	Warship	P-15 Termit		
SS Orith	Israel	13 May 1970	War of Attrition	Warship	P-15 Termit		
PNS Khaibar	Pakistan	4 December 1971	Indo-Pakistan War of 1971	Warship	P-15 Termit		
PNS Muhafiz	Pakistan	4 December 1971	Indo-Pakistan War of 1971	Warship	P-15 Termit		
MV Venus Challenger	United States	8 December 1971	Indo-Pakistan War of 1971	Warship	P-15 Termit		
SS Gulf Star	Panama	8 December 1971	Indo-Pakistan War of 1971	Warship	P-15 Termit		
INS Khukri	India	9 December 1971	Indo-Pakistan War of 1971	Submarine	Torpedo		
Yarmouk	Syria	8 October 1973	Yom Kippur War	Warship	Gabriel Mk 1		
Project 205 Moskit (Note: A Project 183R missile boat was also destroyed.)	Syria	8 October 1973	Yom Kippur War	Warship	Gabriel Mk 1		
Three Project 205 Moskit	Egypt	9 October 1973	Yom Kippur War	Warship	Gabriel Mk 1		
Ilya Mechnikov	Soviet Union	10 October 1973	Yom Kippur War	Warship	Gabriel Mk 1		
TCG Kocatepe	Turkey	22 July 1974	Turkish invasion of Cyprus	Aircraft	Gravity bombs	Friendly fire	
HMBS Flamingo	Bahamas	10 May 1980	Bahamas exclusive economic zone	Aircraft	Rockets		
Two Project 205 Moskit	Iraq	29 November 1980	Iran-Iraq War	Warship	RGM-84 Harpoon		
IRIS Paykan	Iran	29 November 1980	Iran-Iraq War	Warship	P-15 Termit		
Nellie M	United Kingdom	6 February 1981	The Troubles	Hijacked pilot boat	Improvised explosive device		
St. Bedan	United Kingdom	23 February 1982	The Troubles	Hijacked pilot boat	Improvised explosive device		
ARA General Belgrano	Argentina	2 May 1982	Falklands War	Submarine	Mark 8 torpedo		
HMS Sheffield	United Kingdom	4 May 1982	Falklands War	Aircraft	AM39 Exocet	Destroyed by fire, sank six days after being hit	
FV Narwal	Argentina	10 May 1982	Falklands War	Aircraft	Gravity bombs		
ARA Isla de los Estados	Argentina	11 May 1982	Falklands War	Warship	Naval guns		
PNA Río Iguazú	Argentina	21 May 1982	Falklands War	Aircraft	Cannon fire	Stranded in Choiseul Sound and deemed irreparable; finished off with a Sea Skua missile by a Sea King helicopter on 13 June 1982	
HMS Ardent	United Kingdom	22 May 1982	Falklands War	Aircraft	Gravity bombs		
HMS Antelope	United Kingdom	23 May 1982	Falklands War	Aircraft	Gravity bombs		
ELMA Río Carcarañá	Argentina	24 May 1982	Falklands War	Aircraft	Sea Skua	Previously damaged by Sea Harrier cannon fire	
HMS Coventry	United Kingdom	25 May 1982	Falklands War	Aircraft	Gravity bombs		
SS Atlantic Conveyor	United Kingdom	25 May 1982	Falklands War	Aircraft	AM39 Exocet		
RFA Sir Galahad	United Kingdom	8 June 1982	Falklands War	Aircraft	Gravity bombs	Destroyed by fire, scuttled on 21 June 1982	
Foxtrot 4	United Kingdom	8 June 1982	Falklands War	Aircraft	Gravity bombs		
Transit	Lebanon	16 June 1982	1982 Lebanon War	Submarine	Torpedo	Stranded near the coast, eventually sank	
MV Sambow Banner	South Korea	9 August 1982	Iran-Iraq War	Aircraft	AM39 Exocet		
MV Eastern Hunter	Singapore	2 January 1983	Iran-Iraq War	Aircraft	AM39 Exocet		
MV Panoceanic Fame	Greece	15 May 1983	Iran-Iraq War	Aircraft	AM39 Exocet		
MV Iran Reshadat	Iran	24 August 1983	Iran-Iraq War	Aircraft	AM39 Exocet		
MV Iran Rezvan	Iran	25 October 1983	Iran-Iraq War	Aircraft	AM39 Exocet		
MV Skaros	Cyprus	1 February 1984	Iran-Iraq War	Aircraft	AM39 Exocet		
MV Charming	United Kingdom	1 March 1984	Iran-Iraq War	Aircraft	AM39 Exocet		
MV Rana	Saudi Arabia	23 August 1984	Iran-Iraq War	Aircraft	AM39 Exocet		
Sonia	Spain	20 October 1984	Irish exclusive economic zone	Warship	Naval guns		
MV Song Bong	North Korea	13 September 1985	Iran-Iraq War	Aircraft	AM39 Exocet		
MV Castor	Liberia	27 February 1986	Iran-Iraq War	Aircraft	AM39 Exocet		
Waheed	Libya	25 March 1986	Action in the Gulf of Sidra (1986)	Aircraft	AGM-84 Harpoon		
Ain Zaquit	Libya	25 March 1986	Action in the Gulf of Sidra (1986)	Aircraft	AGM-84 Harpoon		
MV Harmony I	Malta	6 May 1986	Iran-Iraq War	Aircraft	AM39 Exocet		
Chian-der 3	Taiwan	28 May 1986	Argentine exclusive economic zone	Warship	Naval guns		
MV Bigerange XIV	Panama	1 September 1987	Iran-Iraq War	Aircraft	AM39 Exocet		
MV Iran Sedaghat	Iran	31 December 1987	Iran-Iraq War	Aircraft	AM39 Exocet		
IRIS Joshan	Iran	19 April 1988	Operation Praying Mantis	Warship	RIM-66 Standard		
IRIS Sahand	Iran	19 April 1988	Operation Praying Mantis	Warship	RGM-84 Harpoon		
ML-151 Vukov Klanac	Yugoslavia	18 September 1991	Croatian War of Independence	Coastal artillery		Hit by Yugoslav People's Army artillery while in the process of being captured by Croatian forces	
BRM-86	Yugoslavia	25 September 1991	Croatian War of Independence	Warship	Naval mine		
Perast	Croatia	5 October 1991	Croatian War of Independence	Warship/Tanks	Naval guns Tank gunfire	Destroyed by fire, rescued by Croatian naval commandos and eventually scrapped	
Fishing motorboat	Croatia	23 October 1991	Croatian War of Independence	Warship	Naval guns	Attempted raid by Croatian naval commandos	
Euro River	Malta	11 November 1991	Croatian War of Independence	Warship	Naval guns		
PČ-176 Mukos	Yugoslavia	14 November 1991	Croatian War of Independence	Naval commandos	Torpedo	Sank in shallow waters, recovered by the Croatian Navy as OB-62 Šolta	
M-144 Iž	Yugoslavia	16 November 1991	Croatian War of Independence	Coastal artillery		Recovered and scrapped by Yugoslavia	
M-143 Olib	Yugoslavia	16 November 1991	Croatian War of Independence	Coastal artillery		Recovered and put in service again by Yugoslavia	
Sveti Vlaho	Croatia	6 December 1991	Croatian War of Independence	Coastal battery	9K11 Malyutka	Refloated in 2001 and preserved as a monument at Batala Park in Dubrovnik.	

=== 21st Century ===
Ship	Nationality	Date	Conflict	Vector	Ordinance	Notes	Ref
Al Mansur	Iraq	27 March 2003	Iraq War	Aircraft	Maverick missile Gravity bombs	Destroyed by fire, looted and finally capsized	
RHIB motorboat	United States	24 April 2004	Iraq War	Suicide boat			
Georgy Toreli	Georgia	10 August 2008	Russo-Georgian War	Warship	P-120 Malakhit		
ROKS Cheonan	South Korea	26 March 2010	Korean conflict	Submarine	Torpedo		
RHIB motorboat	Libya	29 April 2011	2011 military intervention in Libya	Warship	Naval guns		
BG-119	Ukraine	31 August 2014	War in Donbas	Coastal battery			
Lu Yan Yuan Yu 010	China	15 March 2016	Argentine exclusive economic zone	Warship	Naval guns		
Sloviansk	Ukraine	3 March 2022	Russian invasion of Ukraine	Aircraft	Kh-31		
Saratov	Russia	24 March 2022	Russian invasion of Ukraine	Ground battery	Tochka-U	Hit by ballistic missile when moored in Berdyansk harbour.	
Moskva	Russia	14 April 2022	Russian invasion of Ukraine	Coastal battery	R-360 Neptune	Sunk by Ukrainian R-360 Neptune missiles	
Russian tug Spasatel Vasily Bekh	Russia	17 June 2022	Russian invasion of Ukraine	Coastal battery	RGM-84 Harpoon		
Russian landing ship Novocherkassk	Russia	26 December 2022	Russian invasion of Ukraine	Aircraft	Storm Shadow	Destroyed while in port at Sevastopol.	
M/V Rubymar	United Kingdom	2 March 2024	Red Sea crisis	Ground battery	Ballistic missile	First ship sunk by an anti-ship ballistic missile	
Tsiklon	Russia	19 May 2024	Russian invasion of Ukraine	Ground battery	MGM-140 ATACMS	Sunk while in port at Sevastopol.	
MV Tutor	Liberia	18 June 2024	Red Sea crisis	Naval drone		Also hit by an anti-ship missile	
Magic Seas	Liberia	6 July 2025	Red Sea crisis	Ground battery	Ballistic missile	Sunk by a combination of ballistic and anti-ship missiles	
Eternity C	Liberia	7 July 2025	Red Sea crisis	Ground battery	Ballistic missile	Sunk by a combination of ballistic and anti-ship missiles	
Simferopol	Ukraine	28 August 2025	Russian invasion of Ukraine	Naval drone			
IRIS Dena	Iran	4 March 2026	2026 Iran war	Submarine	Mark 48 torpedo		
