= Attacks on the Sounion =

Oil tanker attack and spillage caused by Houthis

August 2024 oil spill caused by attacks on the tanker Sounion
- Interactive map of August 2024 oil spill caused by attacks on the tanker Sounion
- Location: Red Sea, "77 nautical miles to the West of Al Hudaydah"
- Coordinates: 14°59′24.468″N 41°39′17.28″E
- Date: 22 August 2024

Cause
- Cause: Destruction of the oil tanker Sounion by Houthi militants
- Operator: Delta Tankers

Spill characteristics
- Volume: Up to 150,000 tons (~1 million barrels) of petroleum

The attacks on the MT Sounion refers to Houthi attacks on a Greek-registered oil tanker that was carrying approximately 150,000 tons of petroleum cargo, and the resulting spillage of crude oil into the Red Sea. The oil spill was caused by Houthi explosions targeting the ship, which caused the ship to burn and start spilling flaming crude oil into the ocean, which the European Union Aspides military task force described as posing a severe environmental risk to the complex biodiversity of the marine region.

== Background ==
The Red Sea crisis (Note: Arabic: أزمة البحر الأحمر) is an ongoing armed conflict and maritime crisis instigated by the Houthis, an armed group in Yemen. The Houthis began launching missiles and armed drones at Israel in response to the Gaza war, and have seized or attacked dozens of merchant and naval vessels travelling through the Red Sea which they claimed are linked to Israel. These actions provoked a military response from Israel, as well as the United States and the United Kingdom. The crisis is linked to the Middle Eastern crisis, the Iran–Israel proxy conflict, and the Yemeni crisis.

Since 2014, the Houthis, who oppose Yemen's internationally recognized government and receive support from Iran, have controlled a considerable swath of the country's territory along the Red Sea. Shortly after the outbreak of the Gaza war, the Hamas-allied group began to launch missiles and drones at Israel. It has also fired on merchant vessels in the Red Sea, particularly in the Bab-el-Mandeb, the southern maritime gateway to the Suez Canal, damaging the global economy. The group declared that it would not stop until Israel ceased the Gaza war.

The Houthis declared any Israel-linked ship was a target for attack, including US and UK warships, but they also attacked the ships of nations with no connection to Israel. The Houthis have attacked 178 vessels throughout their two-year blockade, according to the NGO Armed Conflict Location and Event Data, sinking four ships and killing nine sailors. To avoid being attacked, hundreds of commercial vessels were rerouted to sail around South Africa.

Houthi Red Sea attacks have drawn military responses from a number of countries. In January 2024, the UN Security Council adopted Resolution 2722, condemning the Houthi attacks and affirming freedom of navigation. The United States-led Operation Prosperity Guardian was launched to protect Red Sea shipping. From 12 January 2024, the US and UK led coalition air and missile strikes against the Houthis, while other countries are independently attacking Houthi vessels in the Red Sea. On 3 May 2024, Yemeni general Yahya Saree said, "We will target any ships heading to Israeli ports in the Mediterranean Sea in any area we are able to reach". On 6 May 2025, US president Donald Trump announced a cessation of US strikes as a result of a bilateral ceasefire between the US and the Houthis. The Houthis halted their attacks on international shipping and on Israel after the Gaza peace plan went into effect on 10 October 2025. Some major shipping corporations, such as Maersk, have since resumed their Red Sea routes, while others have held off due to the volatile situation. On 28 February 2026, in response to attacks on Iran by the United States and Israel, the Houthis threatened to escalate the conflict. On 28 March, the Houthis resumed their attacks on Israel amidst the 2026 Iran war.

=== MT Sounion ===
MT Sounion
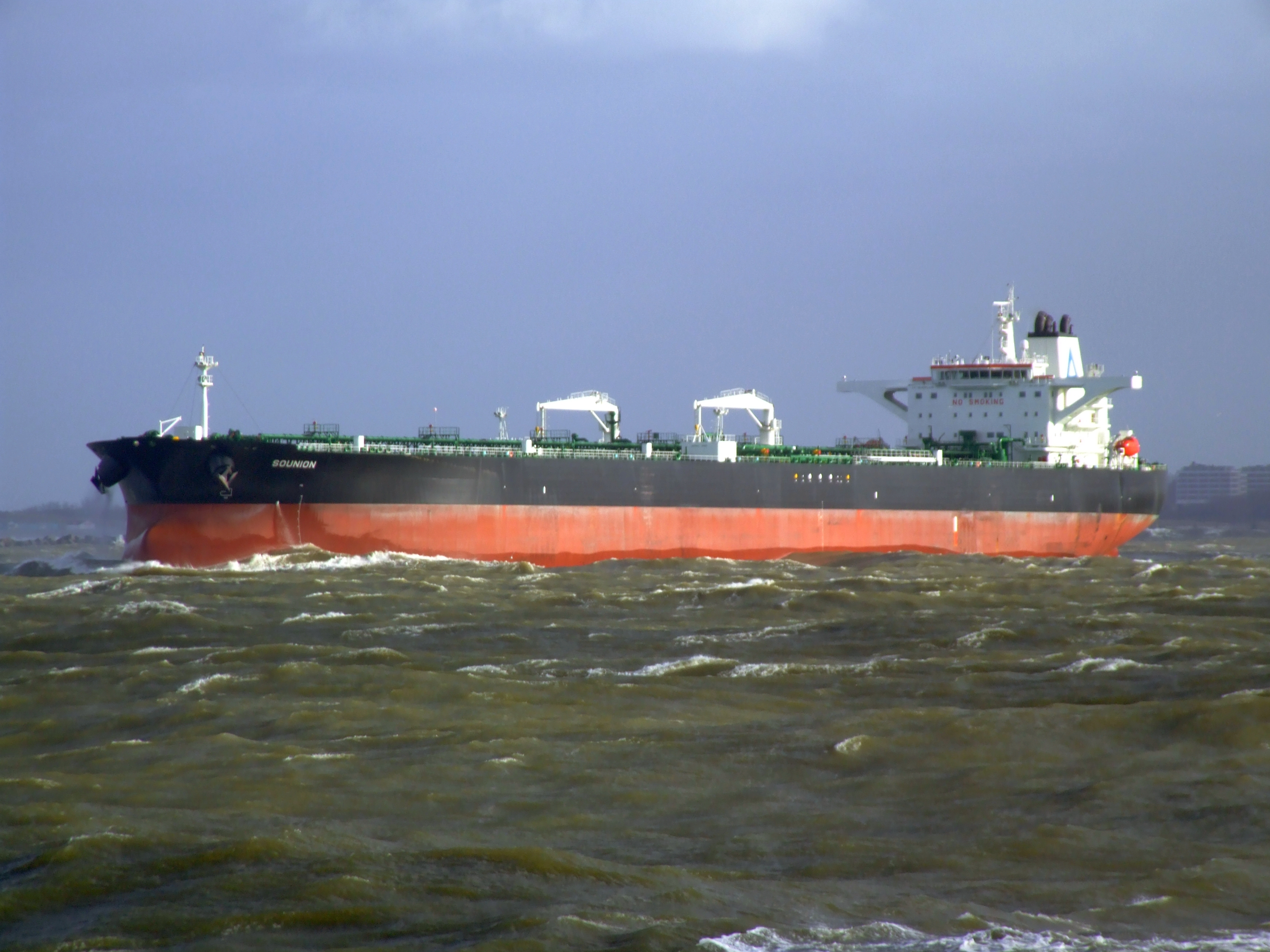
- Sounion leaving Port of Rotterdam, Netherlands, 2007

History
- Name: Sounion
- Owner: Delta Tankers
- Port of registry: Greece
- Completed: 2006
- Identification: IMO number: 9312145; MMSI number: 240542000; Callsign: SWGE

General characteristics
- Class & type: Crude oil tanker
- Tonnage: 85,206 GT; 163,759 DWT
- Length: 274 m (898 ft 11 in)
- Beam: 50.06 m (164 ft 3 in)
- Draught: 11 m (36 ft 1 in)
- Crew: 25

MT Sounion is a crude oil tanker built in November 2006 by the South Korea-based shipbuilder HD Hyundai Samho. Greek-flagged, the ship is registered in Piraeus. She is operated by the Athens-based Delta Tankers, whose ships Delta Blue and Delta Atlantica had previously come under attack by the Houthis.

== Attack ==
On 21 August 2024, the 274-meter (898 ft 11 in)-long oil tanker Sounion, owned by Delta Tankers and crewed by 25 Filipinos and Russians, with four security personnel, was targeted by Houthi militants while near the mouth of the Red Sea. Two Houthi fast attack craft engaged in a firefight with the Sounion's armed guards before three projectiles struck the tanker. The initial attack caused a fire on board that was extinguished, but also resulted in engine failure and the loss of propulsion. The tanker was en route from Basrah, Iraq to the oil refinery at Agioi Theodoroi in Greece. The entire crew was rescued by the European Union Aspides naval military operation while the ship was drifting about 77 nautical miles (143 km; 89 mi) to the west of Al Hudaydah port, using the French frigate Chevalier Paul to evacuate the crew to nearby Djibouti on 22 August 2024. While engaged in rescue operations, the Chevalier Paul sighted an approaching Houthi explosive boat and successfully engaged and destroyed it with the frigate's 20 mm Narwhal guns.

=== Explosions ===
On 23 August, Houthis released videos showing their fighters boarding the ship and subsequent footage from a distance showing three simultaneous massive explosions on the ship, as Houthi militants chanted the slogan of the Houthi movement. The source of the explosions appeared to be explosives planted on the ship by the Houthis rather than missile or drone strikes, due to the simultaneous explosions. The deliberate destruction of an abandoned ship marked an apparent shift in Houthi tactics towards the Red Sea crisis compared to its prior sinking of Rubymar in February 2024 and Tutor in June 2024.

== Oil spill concerns ==
The Aspides task force stated on 23 August that the explosions created a "significant environmental threat due to the large volume of crude oil on board" that could severely damage the diverse marine ecosystem in the Red Sea, and warned all nearby ships not to take any actions that could cause the situation to deteriorate. Video taken by Houthi militants of the ship on fire showed flaming oil pouring into the sea from the top and side of the tanker shortly following the explosions. Sounion was carrying approximately 150,000 tons of petroleum cargo at the time of the explosions, which was about the maximum amount it could carry. On the night of 23 August, the Royal Navy noted that the fires were still burning as the vessel continued drifting.

NASA satellite imaging taken at 10:04 a.m. UTC on 25 August indicated thermal anomalies in the Red Sea at 14° 59' 24.468"N 41° 39' 17.28"E, located north of the space roughly in between Al Hudaydah in Yemen and Tiyo in Eritrea. These readings implied the continuous burning of the ship and its petroleum cargo, as well as prolonged damage to the ship following the three large explosions.

United States Department of State spokesman Matthew Miller stated that the damage to the ship could spill "a million barrels of oil into the Red Sea, an amount four times that in the Exxon Valdez disaster". On 27 August, The Pentagon reported that the tanker appeared to be leaking oil, and was still on fire since the Houthi-conducted explosions on 22 August.

== Salvage efforts ==
=== Initial attempts ===
Initial attempts by two third-party boats to pull the tanker to shore were repelled by Houthi militants threatening to attack them. On 28 August, Iran's envoy to the United Nations announced that the Houthis agreed to a "temporary truce" to allow tugboats and rescue boats to reach the tanker. The Houthis said that no truce was established but that they would allow for the tanker to be rescued due to humanitarian and environmental concerns.

On 31 August, Houthis said that tugboats were expected to start towing the tanker on 1 September.

The salvage operation of the tanker started on 2 September 2024. The operation was abandoned shortly after due to unsafe conditions, according to Operation Aspides. Aspides added that "alternative solutions" were being considered without providing further details.

=== Successful salvage operation ===
On 12 September 2024, the Greek Coast Guard announced that two tugboats from Piraeus escorted by a Greek and French warship were near the tanker and would start towing it that week. A new effort to salvage the tanker started on 14 September 2024. The tanker was slowly towed northwards after a salvage team secured it to the Greek-flagged tugboat Aigaion Pelagos, despite temperatures of up to 400 °F (204 °C) due to the fire. Aspides announced that Sounion was safely towed away from Yemen on 16 September. The rescue operation involved over 200 personnel and the fires took three weeks to extinguish. Aspides forces initially towed the tanker 150 miles (240 km) north, before moving her to Suez for offloading. In January 2025, maritime security organization Ambrey announced that Sounion's cargo was successfully removed and the ship was declared safe.

== Reactions ==
Houthi spokesperson Yahya Saree, posted a video claiming that the Yemeni Navy had destroyed Sounion, and stating that the motive for destroying the ship was the company violating Houthi-imposed restrictions on the use of Israeli ports, which were referred to as the ports of "occupied Palestine".

The Pentagon strongly condemned the Houthi movement for deliberately targeting the abandoned oil tanker and knowingly creating a severe environmental disaster that could significantly affect Yemen and the livelihood of its citizens. Pentagon administrator Sabrina Singh stated in response to the attacks, "What exactly does this accomplish? They said they were launching these attacks to help the people of Gaza, not sure how that helps anyone in Gaza."

Matthew Miller, speaking on behalf of the United States Department of State, said on 24 August that the Houthis appeared "determined to sink the ship and its cargo into the sea" and that they were "willing to destroy the fishing industry and regional ecosystems that Yemenis and other communities in the region rely on for their livelihoods." He called upon the Houthis to stop these actions and for other countries to intervene in order to prevent further environmental damage to the region.

== See also ==
- Attacks on the MV Tutor
- Attack on True Confidence
- Sinking of the MV Rubymar
