= Delta Tankers =

Greek shipping company

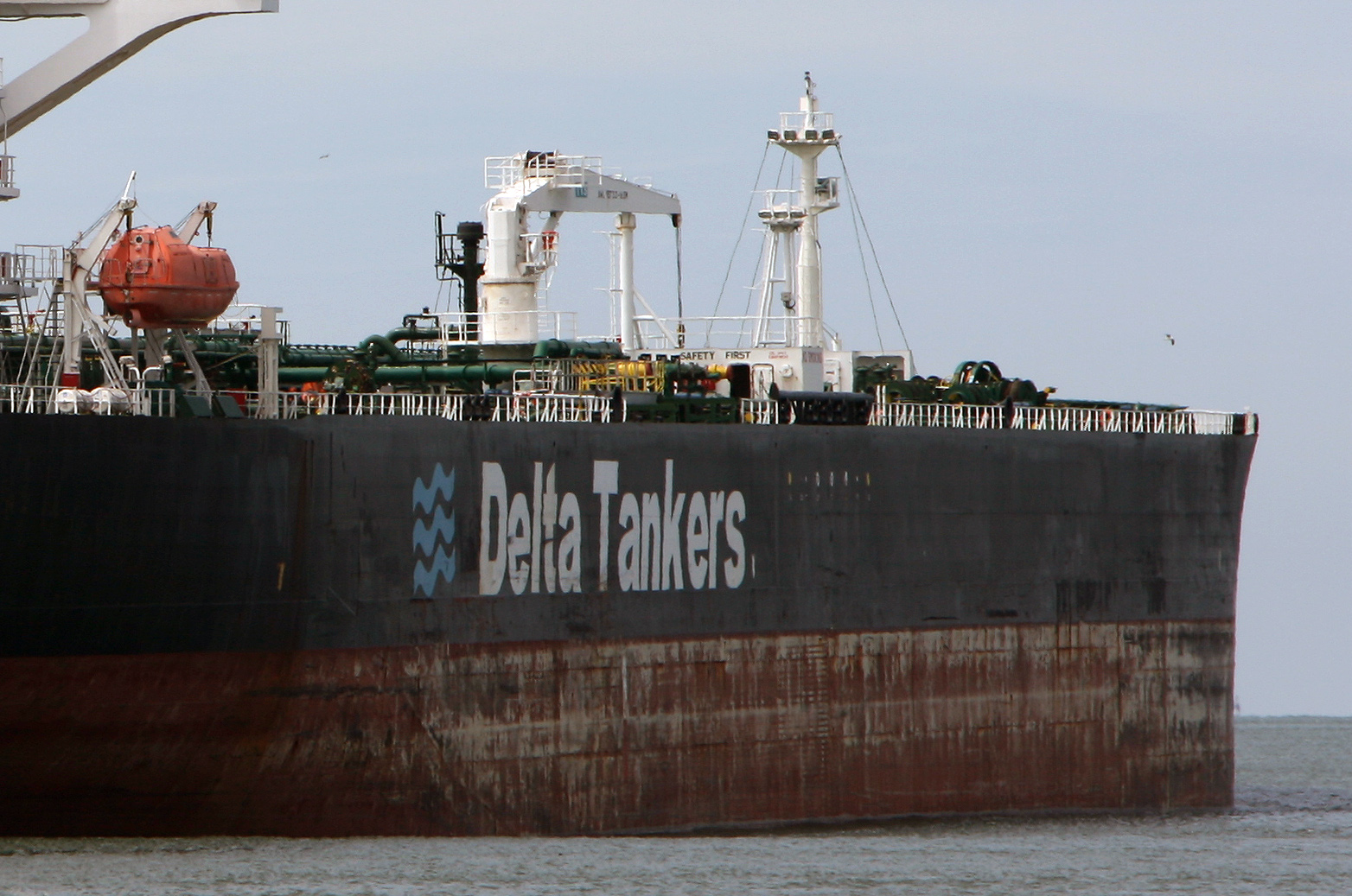
- Industry: Oil tanker, Bulk cargo
- Founded: 2006
- Headquarters: Athens, Greece
- Owner: Diamantis Diamantidis
- Website: www.deltatankers.gr

Delta Tankers is a Greek shipping company, highly active in the suezmax and VLCC sectors.

== Controversies ==
Delta Tankers ltd is the manager of the crude oil tanker Bouboulina (IMO 9298753), the ship that Brazilian investigators said was the source of oil tarring thousands of kilometers of coastline since August 2019. Delta Tankers Ltd said on Friday that it has not been contacted by Brazilian authorities investigating an oil spill incident in Brazil. The Brazilian oil spill prompted the company in November 2019 to offer to share the ship's data with the Brazilian investigators.

In 2022 Ukraine added Delta Tankers to its International Sponsors of War list.

== Accidents and incidents ==
- Attacks on the Sounion: In August 2024, the tanker Sounion was attacked by Houthi forces of Yemen. She was abandoned, and then set ablaze. Salvage operations started in September 2024.

== See also ==
- Greek Merchant Marine
- MARPOL 73/78
