= Attacks on the Eternity C =

Houthi attacks on the MV Eternity C

Attacks on the MV Eternity C
- Part of the Red Sea crisis, Houthi attacks on commercial vessels and Middle Eastern crisis (2023–present)
- Location: Red Sea
- Date: 7–8 July 2025
- Target: MV Eternity C
- Weapons: Unmanned aerial vehicles; Unmanned surface vessels; Rocket-propelled grenades
- Deaths: 4 (Filipinos: 3 confirmed; 1 presumed)
- Victims: 25; 22 crew members: 21 Filipinos, 1 Russian; 3 private guards: 1 Greek, 2 Indians
- Perpetrator: Houthis

On 7 July 2025, the Houthis attacked MV Eternity C, a Liberia-flagged bulk carrier, in the southern Red Sea on route from Berbera, Somalia, where it has been delivering aid. The vessel was assaulted with sea drones and rocket-propelled grenades and was seriously damaged. The vessel was abandoned and sank shortly after the attacks. Among at least 25 Filipino, Indian, Greek and Russian personnel on board, four Filipino crew members have been either confirmed or presumed killed in the attack; while the rest survived, with eleven of them captured by the Houthis and released in December.

The Houthis stated they attacked Eternity C because the vessel's operator continues to make port visits to Israel with other ships, and that they took an unspecified number of crew to a "safe location", although the United States stated the Houthis had taken the crew hostage. The vessel is registered in Monrovia, and owned and managed by Cosmo Ship Management of Athens, Greece.

During the same period, the merchant ship Magic Seas was hijacked and sunk by the Houthis after an attack.

== Background ==
=== Red Sea crisis ===
Since November 2023, the Houthis, who captured the capital of Yemen in 2014 during the country's civil war, have conducted attacks against merchant and naval vessels they claim are linked to Israel, mainly in the Red Sea and Gulf of Aden. The Houthis state the attacks are carried out in solidarity with the Palestinians in the Gaza war. The attacks sparked airstrikes led by the United States, Israel, and the United Kingdom against targets in Houthi-controlled territory in Yemen.

The attacks forced companies to halt shipping in the Red Sea, which previously accounted for 12% of global trade.

=== MV Eternity C ===
MV Eternity C was a bulk carrier which sailed under the flag of Liberia. The ship had completed a humanitarian delivery for the World Food Programme to Berbera, Somalia, where it has arrived in late June and left around noon on 6 July, and was heading to Jeddah, Saudi Arabia, to refuel.

=== Prior attack ===
A similar incident occurred prior to that involving Eternity C. On 6 July, the Houthis launched missile and drone attack at cargo ship Magic Seas in the Red Sea, southwest of the Houthi-controlled port city of Hodeidah in Yemen. The said bulk carrier was carrying iron and fertiliser from China to Turkey. The strikes reportedly caused damages on the vessel's cargo, and as reported by the United Kingdom Maritime Trade Operations (UKMTO), set the ship ablaze, causing it to sink. All 22 personnel aboard—the crew of 17 Filipinos, a Romanian and a Vietnamese; and three Sri Lankan security guards—abandoned the ship prior to its sinking, were rescued by a passing Emirati merchant vessel, and were later brought to Djibouti.

The Yemen's Iran-backed group, on 7 July, claimed responsibility for the assault; and released a video footage the following day, showing armed men boarding the vessel, and the vessel's explosion and sinking. Significantly, it was their first known attack in the area within few months.

Both vessels, Liberian-flagged and Greek-operated, had docked in Israel in the past.

== Events ==
=== Attack and immediate aftermath ===
The Eternity C, while navigating the Red Sea off Hodeidah in western Yemen and en route to Jeddah, Saudi Arabia, was attacked twice by Houthi militants with gunfire, remote-controlled sea drones loaded with explosives, and rocket-propelled grenades from skiffs. The first occurred in the afternoon of 7 July 2025; while the second in the night of 8 July forced the crew to jump into the water. The bulk carrier was badly damaged and, as UKMTO and the Agence France-Presse (AFP) reported, eventually sank in the morning of 9 July.

There were 25 people reportedly aboard the vessel—a 22-member crew (21 Filipinos and a Russian) and a three-member private maritime security team (two Indians and a Greek).

Operation Aspides, the European Union's maritime security mission that coordinated rescue operations, later presumed the deaths of at least four in the attack and its aftermath. On 4 December, the Department of Migrant Workers in the Philippines confirmed that three Filipino crew members died, whose remains were later transported back to their country; while another reportedly remained missing after jumping out of the ship.

=== Search and rescue operations ===
On 9 July, a search and rescue mission began overnight. Operation Aspides later reported that ten mariners had been rescued until 10 July, including eight Filipino crew members and two security personnel—its Greek leader and an Indian. They were later brought by a ship to Jizan, Saudi Arabia.

Also on 9 July, the Houthis issued a statement claiming responsibility on the attack, saying that the ship allegedly headed toward Eilat, Israel. They also released a video showing a cargo vessel sinking after the attack. They claimed having taken some mariners to an undisclosed location, but offered no evidence. Meanwhile, United States authorities in Yemen accused the rebels of kidnapping the crew members, and demanded their immediate release.

On 13 July, two private security firms running the search for the missing individuals announced that the vessel's owner called off the operations. At that time, 11 others remained unaccounted for; as Cosmoship, the vessel's manager based in Greece, considered the remaining 15 (then included five deaths as claimed by maritime security sources) as missing.

=== Detention and release of remaining mariners ===
On 17 July, Russia's state-run RIA news agency reported that a Russian crew member had been picked up by the Yemeni Navy. Later identified as an electrician, he had been hospitalized in Sana'a after being badly injured, losing his leg onboard the ship.

On 28 July, the Houthis released a propaganda video, which was posted later in X, allegedly showing ten crew members being held. Among them are nine Filipinos and a Russian. The video claimed that the rebels rescued the crew, pulling them from the sea, as reportedly detailed by the latter. According to the rebels, eleven crew members were rescued, including the two injured who were treated, and a body was recovered from the ship. The Philippine Department of Foreign Affairs (DFA) later said that a Filipino and a foreign personnel were injured, and these Filipino sailors were moved to rebel-controlled Sana'a.

The DFA and the Omani Foreign Ministry had been mediating in the release of seafarers, which was discussed twice—in a bilateral meeting in July, and in a phone call in November. On 3 December, a day after the announcement by DFA, all 11 captive seafarers—nine Filipinos, one Indian, and one Russian—were freed in Sana'a and were transported to Muscat, Oman, on an Omani Royal Air Force aircraft. AFP reported that their release, done in exchange for the repatriation of 35 Yemenis stranded abroad, was part of an agreement between the governments of Yemen and of Oman which was the result of "pressure" from the former.

== Reactions ==
The United States Department of State condemned the attacks on both the Magic Seas and Eternity C that "demonstrate the ongoing threat that [the Houthis] pose to freedom of navigation and to regional [...] security."

Arsenio Dominguez, Secretary-General of the International Maritime Organization, in an address to the council during a convention in London, likewise condemned the renewed assaults on both merchant ships and called for intensified diplomatic efforts.
