= Attacks on the MV Tutor =

Part of the Red Sea Crisis in 2024

- Part of the Red Sea crisis and Middle Eastern crisis (2023–present)
- Location: Red Sea, 66.7 nautical miles (123.5 km; 76.8 mi) southwest of Al Hudaydah
- Date: 12 June 2024 (attacked); 18 June 2024 (sank)
- Target: MV Tutor
- Weapons: Unmanned surface vessel and anti-ship missile; Additional missiles and unmanned aerial vehicles (per Houthis)
- Deaths: 1 Filipino killed
- Perpetrators: Houthis; Yemeni Navy (SPC faction)

On 12 June 2024, the Yemeni Houthi movement attacked MV Tutor, a Liberia-flagged bulk carrier, in the southern Red Sea with an unmanned surface vehicle (USV) and an anti-ship missile, killing one crewmember. The vessel was seriously damaged, and later abandoned by her crew. She sank six days after the attacks. The attacks mark the first successful usage of a USV and the second sinking by the Houthis in the Red Sea crisis.

== Background ==
=== Red Sea crisis ===
Since November 2023, the Houthis, who captured the capital of Yemen in 2014 during the country's civil war, have conducted attacks against merchant and naval vessels they claim are linked to Israel, mainly in the Red Sea and Gulf of Aden. The attacks are carried out in solidarity with the Palestinians in the Gaza war, which began after Hamas led an attack against Israel which saw over 1,200 people killed and 250 taken hostage. Israel's response saw an air, ground and sea assault on the Gaza Strip in which the Gaza Health Ministry reported that over 37,000 Palestinians were killed. The attacks sparked airstrikes led by the United States and United Kingdom against targets in Houthi-controlled territory in Yemen.

The attacks forced shipping to move around Africa and away from the Red Sea, which previously accounted for 12% of global trade. Major companies across sixty-five countries have been affected by the crisis, including Shell, BP and Maersk. Throughout the Houthi campaign, over 50 ships were attacked, three sailors were killed, and one ship, Galaxy Leader, was hijacked.

=== MV Tutor ===
MV Tutor
History
- Name: Tutor
- Owner: Evalend Shipping, Athina, Greece
- Port of registry: Liberia
- Completed: 2022
- Identification: IMO number: 9942627; MMSI number: 636021179; Callsign: 5LCR2
- Fate: Sank on 18 June 2024, six days after being attacked by Houthis

General characteristics
- Class & type: Bulk carrier
- Tonnage: 44,479 GT; 82,357 DWT
- Length: 229 m (751 ft 4 in)
- Beam: 32.3 m (106 ft 0 in)
- Crew: 22

MV Tutor was a coal carrier which sailed under the flag of Liberia with a length overall of 229 metres (751 ft 4 in) and a width of 32.3 metres (106 ft 0 in). Owned by the Athens-based Evalend Shipping, she was built in 2022 with a gross tonnage of 44,479 and deadweight tonnage of 82,357 tons.

At the time of the attacks, she was en route to India after loading at the Port of Ust-Luga, Russia on 18 May. She discharged at Port Said, Egypt on 9 June and was due to make a stop at Aqaba, Jordan before she was attacked. According to the Houthi-run TV Channel Al-Masirah, the Houthis claimed that Tutor was attacked because a sister ship belonging Evalend had entered the Israeli port of Haifa:

"We have sent emails to the maritime companies informing them and warning that if their ships enter [the ports of the occupied territories], they will be on the banned list".

== Attacks ==
External videos
- Houthi video shows attack that sank the bulk carrier MV Tutor in the Red Sea (via NBC News)

At 07:10 AST, Tutor's master reported an attack around 66.7 nautical miles (123.5 km; 76.8 mi) southwest of Al Hudaydah. The ship was directly struck on her stern by a USV, which the United Kingdom Maritime Trade Operations (UKMTO) described as a "small, 5–7-metre (16–23 ft) long craft of white color". The crew members recounted seeing what they thought was a small fishing vessel approach the port quarter seemingly carrying two people, who were revealed to have been mannequins. The vessel then struck the ship's stern and detonated. The attack caused severe damage to her engine room, where a crew member was located. Later, she was struck again on her engine room by an unknown aerial projectile, likely an anti-ship missile. The engine room faced severe flooding and reportedly a fire, causing the crew to lose control of the ship. On 13 June, Houthi spokesperson Yahya Saree claimed responsibility for the attack, claiming to have destroyed the ship and adding that she was targeted with a number of missiles and drones along with the missile and USV that struck her, the latter of which he called a "drone boat". He said that the attacks were "dedicated to the mujahideen in Gaza".

Her crew eventually abandoned the ship with the help of US and allied forces in the Red Sea, including the USS Dwight D. Eisenhower carrier strike group, military helicopters from USS Philippine Sea, and a French frigate. Twenty-one of the 22 crew members were rescued and airlifted to a United States Navy cruiser before being sent to Dwight D. Eisenhower for medical check-ups. Initial reports said that the crew would be evacuated to Djibouti. The Filipino crew members, who made up a majority of the crew, were then transported to the port of Manama, Bahrain before being taken via plane to Manila, Philippines. The Filipino crew member who remained missing was confirmed deceased by US official John Kirby on 18 June.

=== Sinking ===
On 18 June, the United Kingdom Maritime Trade Operations (UKMTO) reported that the ship likely sank overnight off the coast of Eritrea, at the coordinates of 14"19'N 041"14'E, after receiving reports of oil and debris in the ship's last position. On the morning of the following day, the UKMTO confirmed her sinking. She is the second ship to be sunken throughout the Red Sea crisis. On 21 June, the Houthis released footage of the Unmanned surface vehicle (USV) used in the attack, which they called the "Tufan" or "Flood".

== Aftermath ==
On 15 June, the United States conducted airstrikes against seven Houthi radar systems inside Yemen which allowed them to target vessels. The strikes were reportedly in response to the attacks on Tutor.

Also on that date, the Houthis claimed that the ship was at risk of sinking. US Central Command (CENTCOM) acknowledged severe flooding, with the vessel slowly taking in water. Two tugboats from the Tsavliris Salvage Group were deployed to recover the vessel. The salvage operation was abandoned following her sinking.

=== Reactions ===
White House spokesperson John Kirby called the attacks "terrorism" and called the Houthis claim to be supporting Gazans "meritless". He added that the crew member killed, along with another sailor injured during a separate attack on the Verbana, "weren't delivering arms to Israel, they weren't taking sides in the Middle East," and were just doing their jobs on the vessel.

The Department of Foreign Affairs of the Philippines condemned the attack and vowed to take steps to protect Filipino seafarers. It also called on the United Nations to protect seafarers' human rights. The Department of Migrant Workers held a meeting to discuss the safety of Filipino sailors and vowed to review its current policies. President Ferdinand Romualdez Marcos Jr. also stated that his government was doing everything it could to ensure the safety of the Tutor's crew.

Several shipping organizations released a joint statement condemning the attacks and calling for further attacks to cease, including World Shipping Council, European Community Shipowners' Associations and Asian Shipowners' Association.

== See also ==
- MV True Confidence
- MV Rubymar
