= Marlin Luanda missile strike =

2024 maritime incident

Marlin Luanda
History
- Name: Navig8 Pride LHJ (2018–2022); Marlin Luanda (2022–2024); Boccadasse (from 2024)
- Owner: Ocean Yi Shipping (2018–2022); Polar 18 Ltd (from 2022)
- Operator: Navig8 Asia (2018–2022); Oceonix, and Suntech Maritime (from 2022)
- Port of registry: Marshall Islands
- Builder: New Times Shipyard, China
- Completed: 2018
- Identification: IMO number: 9829899; Call sign: V7KT9; MMSI number: 538007848

General characteristics
- Tonnage: 63,338 GT; 109,991 DWT
- Length: 249.9 m (819 ft 11 in)
- Beam: 44 m (144 ft 4 in)
- Draft: 14.95 m (49 ft 1 in)

On 26 January 2024, during the Red Sea crisis, the fuel tanker Marlin Luanda was struck by an anti-ship missile fired by Houthi forces.

== Marlin Luanda ==
The Marlin Luanda was an oil tanker built in 2018 at the New Times Shipyards in Taizhou, China. The ship was built as the Marshall Islands-registered Navig8 Pride LHJ for Ocean Yi Shipping of Hong Kong and managed by Navig8 Asia Pte Ltd. In February 2022, the ship was sold to Polar 18 Ltd and renamed Marlin Luanda; it was operated by UK-based Oceonix Services, with ship management by Suntech Maritime of Singapore. When attacked, the tanker was under charter to Trafigura, a commodity trading company, also based in Singapore.

After the incident, in April 2024, the ship was renamed Boccadasse, without change of ownership, management, or national register.

== Missile strike ==
Despite the instigation in November 2023 of Houthi attacks on merchant ships, by January 2024 most oil tankers had continued traversing the Red Sea, with the significant exception of QatarEnergy. While sailing to Singapore from Egypt the tanker, carrying Russian naphtha purchased below the price cap, was struck by an anti-ship missile fired by Houthi rebels, as part of the Red Sea crisis. At the time it was approximately 110 kilometres (59 nmi; 68 mi) south-east of Aden. The strike caused a fire in one of the ship's starboard cargo tanks, and the crew deployed firefighting equipment to combat it. Early reports suggested the crew had abandoned the vessel, but this was later confirmed to be false.

Following the strike, the USS Carney set sail towards the stricken vessel; it was also targeted by a Houthi missile. According to an anonymous US official, this was the first time the Houthis had directly targeted a US military vessel since the crisis began.

On 27 January, Trafigura released a statement saying that the crew were unharmed, and that they continued to battle the fire with the aid of military vessels. Later that day, Trafigura announced that the fire had been put out with the assistance of Indian, American, and French vessels and that the ship was heading towards a safe port. The USS Carney, French frigate Alsace and the Indian destroyer INS Visakhapatnam assisted. Ten Indian Navy sailors with specialist fire fighting equipment came aboard, and fought the fire with the Marlin Luanda crew of 22 Indians and one Bangladeshi for six hours.

The Houthis stated that the vessel was British and was targeted in response to "American-British aggression against our country".

== Aftermath ==
Trafigura announced that it was assessing the risk of further voyages through the Red Sea following the strikes, while the tanker Free Spirit carrying crude oil, avoided entering the Gulf of Aden shortly after the strike by reversing its track. On 30 January 2024, the Houthis launched an unsuccessful attack on a second ship operated by Oceonix, the container ship Koi, chartered to CMA CGM.

In July 2024 the International Maritime Organization decided to recognize the "extraordinary courage, determination and endurance demonstrated while coordinating firefighting and damage control efforts to combat the fire" by Captain Avhilash Rawat and the crew of Marlin Luanda, with the IMO 2024 Award for Exceptional Bravery at Sea.
