= Hijacking of the Galaxy Leader =

2023 seizing of a ship in the Red Sea

- Part of Middle Eastern crisis (2023–present) and Red Sea crisis
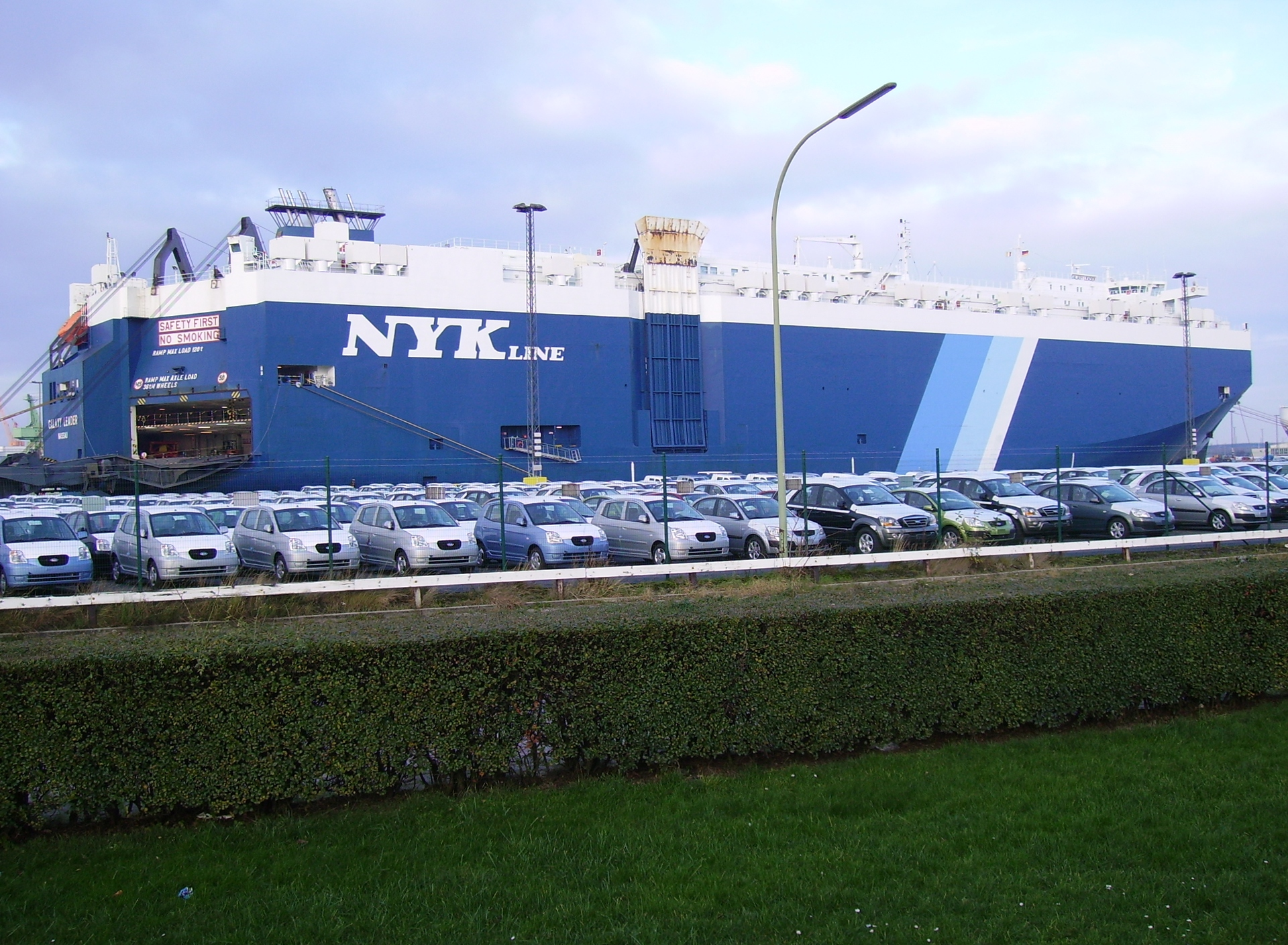
- Galaxy Leader in 2006
Date	November 19, 2023
Location	Red Sea
Status	Galaxy Leader held by Houthis, Hostages released after January 2025 Gaza war ceasefire

Parties involved
Houthis	Crew members

Strength
1 helicopter 10 armed militants	25 unarmed crew members

Casualties and losses
None	25 taken hostage, Some injured in the incident

The hijacking of the Galaxy Leader occurred on November 19, 2023, when Yemen's Houthi rebels seized the Bahamian-flagged, Japanese-operated and British-owned cargo ship Galaxy Leader in the Red Sea near the Yemeni port of Hodeidah. The ship, en route from Turkey to India, was boarded by 10 armed militants who were dropped off by a helicopter and detained its 25 crew members, including nationals from the Philippines, Ukraine, Mexico, and Romania.

== Hijacking ==
At least ten armed Houthi hijackers used a military helicopter to board the vessel. After seizing the vessel, they brought it to Hodeidah. Onboard Galaxy Leader were 25 crew members, including 17 from the Philippines; other crew members came from Bulgaria (including the captain and first mate), Ukraine, Mexico, and Romania. The maritime risk management firm Ambrey also described the hijacking as sophisticated and bearing the hallmarks of an Iranian-style operation. The Houthis videorecorded their attack and released the footage the next day, using the attack as propaganda.

An American defense official told the Associated Press in November 2023 that hijackers appeared to have been trained by a professional military, possibly Iran's. The Iranian government supports the Houthis, and the United States government said in December 2023 that the Iranian operational and intelligence assistance facilitated the Houthis' attacks on commercial vessels in the Red Sea. The Iranian government denied involvement.

After 430 days in captivity, the 25 crew members were released and transferred to Oman. The release coincided with a cease-fire agreement in Gaza and a reduction in Houthi attacks in the Red Sea.

== Aftermath ==
The hijacking of the Galaxy Leader, as well as a spate of Houthi drone and missile attacks on merchant shipping in the Bab-el-Mandeb strait passing into the Red Sea, threatened global shipping routes. This prompted the creation, in December 2023, of Operation Prosperity Guardian, a multilateral operation of ten nations to protect shipping in the area. The effort, which is under the auspices of the Combined Task Force 153, is led by the United States Navy, with the participation of the Royal Navy, Bahrain, Canada, France, Italy, Netherlands, Norway, Seychelles, and Spain.

On March 16, 2025, Houthi media reported that the United States Air Force bombed the command area of the bridge during its March 2025 attacks on the Houthis. On April 28, Houthi-linked news outlet Al-Masirah reported that three US airstrikes hit the ship. On July 6, the vessel was attacked by Israel. According to Israel, Houthis installed a radar system on the ship that is being used to track vessels in international maritime space. In photos taken 30 April 2026, the ship is partially sunk by the stern and bow is pointing skyward near the beach.

== International reactions ==
- United States — The U.S. government denounced the seizure of a cargo ship as a violation of international law and demanded the immediate release of the vessel and its crew.
- United Nations — The Security Council condemned the Houthi seizure of the ship and demanded the immediate release of the vessel and its 25 crew members, who had been unlawfully detained for almost a year.
- United Kingdom — "The UK is committed to ensuring the safety of shipping in the region, including through our contribution to the International Maritime Security Construct and Combined Maritime Forces," said the UK Foreign Office.
- Japan — Japan condemned the hijacking of the Japanese-operated, British-owned cargo ship.
- Israel — The Israel Defense Forces called the hijacking a "very serious incident on the global scale."
