= Naval co-operation and guidance for shipping =

Supersedes Naval Control and Protection of Shipping (NCAPS)

Naval co-operation and guidance for shipping (NCAGS) is a naval doctrinal term. Naval personnel are trained to carry out NCAGS establish and provide advice for safe passage of merchant ships worldwide, during times of peace, tension, crisis and war. NCAGS personnel act as a liaison between military commanders and the civil authorities. During war, the NCAGS organization may be responsible for establishing a convoy. NCAGS is used by many NATO countries during exercises such as Bell Buoy. NCAGS has been an important part of the naval reserves.

Previously, the doctrinal term used was naval control of shipping.

NCAGS is often a joint effort between countries, and NATO maintains a dedicated NCAGS presence at the NATO Shipping Centre, part of Allied Maritime Command in Northwood, UK. It conducts multinational exercises to strengthen ties between national navies and the civilian shipping industry.

NCAGS exercises such as Exercise Lucky Mariner test NCAGS skills.

NCAGS can sometimes be confused with Allied Worldwide Navigational Information System (AWNIS), but that is just one tool that some NCAGS operators happen to be trained in.

== United Kingdom Maritime Trade Operations ==
After 2001, the UK's Royal Navy created a Naval Reserve–manned UK Maritime Trade Operations (UKMTO) office in Dubai to coordinate and exchange information with merchant traffic in the Arabian Sea to help counter Somali piracy. It acts as the primary point of contact for merchant ships to connect and liaise with military forces in the Arabian Sea, Red Sea and Persian Gulf.

The Maritime Trade Information Centre (MTIC) in Portsmouth, UK, supports UKMTO outputs.

The UK Maritime Trade Operations office often releases warnings as well as reports regarding maritime activity - for example, it details instances of piracy and publicly warns nearby vessels - in its areas of responsibility. The UKMTO had over 55,600 followers on X, as of October 2026.

== NCAGS in the US Navy ==
In the US Navy, NCAGS is a function that is staffed by the Navy Reserve. As of 2018, it was composed of:

- NCAGS Norfolk supporting US Fleet Forces
- NCAGS San Diego supporting US Third Fleet
- NCAGS Houston supporting US Fourth Fleet
- NCAGS Chicago supporting US Fifth Fleet
- NCAGS New York supporting US Sixth Fleet
- NCAGS Kitsap supporting US Seventh Fleet
