= MV True Confidence =

Bulk carrier

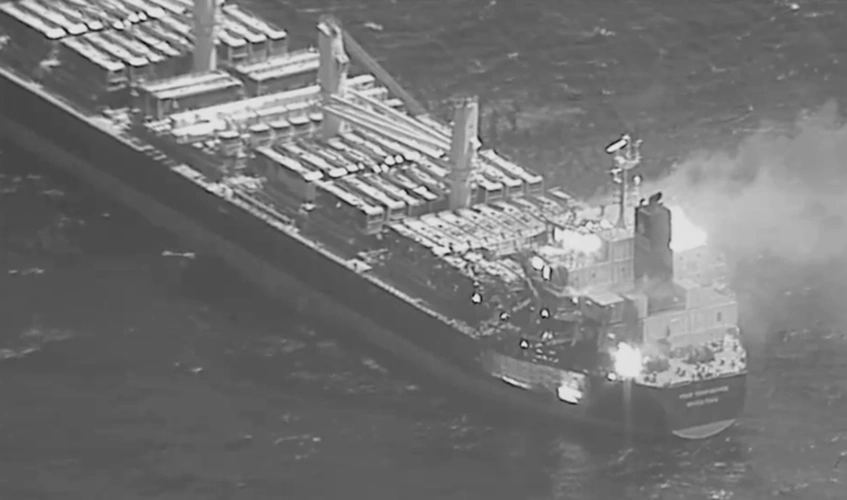
- Houthi anti-ship missile striking the ship

History
- Name: Teizan (2011–2021); True Confidence (from 2021)
- Owner: Olamar Navegacion SA (2011–2021); OCM Maritime Loire LLC (2021–2024); True Confidence Shipping SA (from 2024)
- Operator: Usui Kaiun KK (2011–2021); Third January Maritime Ltd (from 2021)
- Port of registry: Panama (2011–2021); Barbados (from 2021)
- Builder: Oshima Shipbuilding, Sakai
- Yard number: 10610
- Launched: 17 June 2011
- Completed: 2011
- Identification: IMO number: 9460784; MMSI number: 314579000; Callsign: 8PBF4
- Fate: Struck by a Houthi anti-ship missile on 6 March 2024

General characteristics
- Class & type: Bulk carrier
- Tonnage: 29,104 GT
- Length: 183 m (600 ft 5 in)
- Beam: 32 m (105 ft 0 in)
- Crew: 20

MV True Confidence is a Barbados-flagged bulk carrier managed by Third January Maritime, a Greek company, and owned by True Confidence Shipping, a Liberian shipping company. The vessel was attacked on 6 March 2024, causing the first civilian casualties of Houthi attacks on merchant shipping during the Red Sea crisis.

== Attack ==
During the Red Sea crisis, on 6 March 2024, at around 12:30 p.m. AST, True Confidence was struck by a Houthi anti-ship ballistic missile 54 nautical miles (100 km; 62 mi) southwest of Aden, Yemen, after individuals claiming to be the Yemeni Navy hailed the vessel over radio for approximately 30 minutes and ordered her to alter her course. Three members of the ship's crew were killed, the first to die in the Houthi attacks.

United States Central Command imagery shows significant damage to the aft port quarter of the crew spaces below the level of the deck cargo. This indicates that the ship had indeed turned around and was on a south east course when the missiles struck at around 02:00UTC, two hours after the initial VHF radio contact was reported to the Indian Navy destroyer INS Kolkata. The attack caused significant damage to the ship, and her crew members abandoned the vessel shortly after. A fire also broke out in the pilothouse. Houthis stated that the attack came after the vessel rejected warning messages issued by them. The attack resulted in the first civilian casualties aboard merchant vessels in the Red Sea crisis, killing three crewmembers and injuring four others, including three of which who were in critical condition, according to United States Central Command. The vessel had a crew of 20 at the time of the attack, and an additional three armed guards. The crew included 15 Filipinos, four Vietnamese and one Indian, of which two Filipinos and one Vietnamese died; also on board were two Sri Lankan and one Nepali armed guards.

The extent of the damage to the ship is unclear. The vessel's crew deployed lifeboats before abandoning her, and were eventually evacuated to Djibouti. Both the United States Navy warship USS Philippine Sea and INS Kolkata were deployed to assist in rescue efforts.

At the time of the attack, the vessel was carrying a cargo of steel products and trucks from Lianyungang, China to Jeddah, Saudi Arabia and Aqaba, Jordan.

The Houthis claimed that the vessel was American-owned, however a spokesman for the ship's owners rejected the claim, saying it had no relation with American entities. The vessel's owners, the company True Confidence Shipping, is registered in Liberia, and she is operated by the Greece-based organization Third January Maritime. Both firms confirmed that they were unrelated to the United States. However, until 24 February 2024 the vessel was connected to the Los Angeles-based Oaktree Capital Management.

== Reactions ==
- European Union: The EU condemned the attack. It reiterated that Houthi attacks violated international law, freedom of navigation, global trade, and put sailors' lives at risk and must cease immediately. The EU also stated that its member states were willing to protect vessels through Operation Aspides.
- France: France offered condolences to the victims and their loved ones. It also called for the Houthis to cease attacks on international shipping, saying that they had reached a new level.
- Israel: The Israeli Embassy in Manila offered condolences to the Philippines over the death of two Filipinos in the attack. It also stated that it stood in solidarity with the Philippine government and that it condemned all acts of terrorism.
- Japan: The Japanese Foreign Ministry offered condolences to the victims, and stated that Japan unequivocally condemned the attack on the MV True Confidence, and the other persistent attacks by Houthis against shipping in the waters around the Arabian Peninsula. It added that Japan would continue to fulfill its duty to secure freedom of navigation and take necessary measures while cooperating with relevant countries.
- Philippines: The Philippine government said it was deeply distressed and concerned after learning that the attack on the MV True Confidence killed two of its citizens.
- United Nations: The UN condemned Houthi attacks on shipping in the Red Sea, including the attack against the MV True Confidence, which it described as tragic.
- Vietnam: Vietnam called the attack violent and inhumane, and Foreign Ministry Spokesperson Phạm Thu Hằng urged for the parties involved in the conflict to cease the use of force and ensure security, safety, and freedom for international shipping.
- Yemen: The Presidium of the Southern Transitional Council condemned and denounced the attack, describing it as terrorist and saying that the situation in the Red Sea had reached a dangerous stage of escalation and required an international response.
