= MV Rubymar =

Belize-flagged bulk carrier

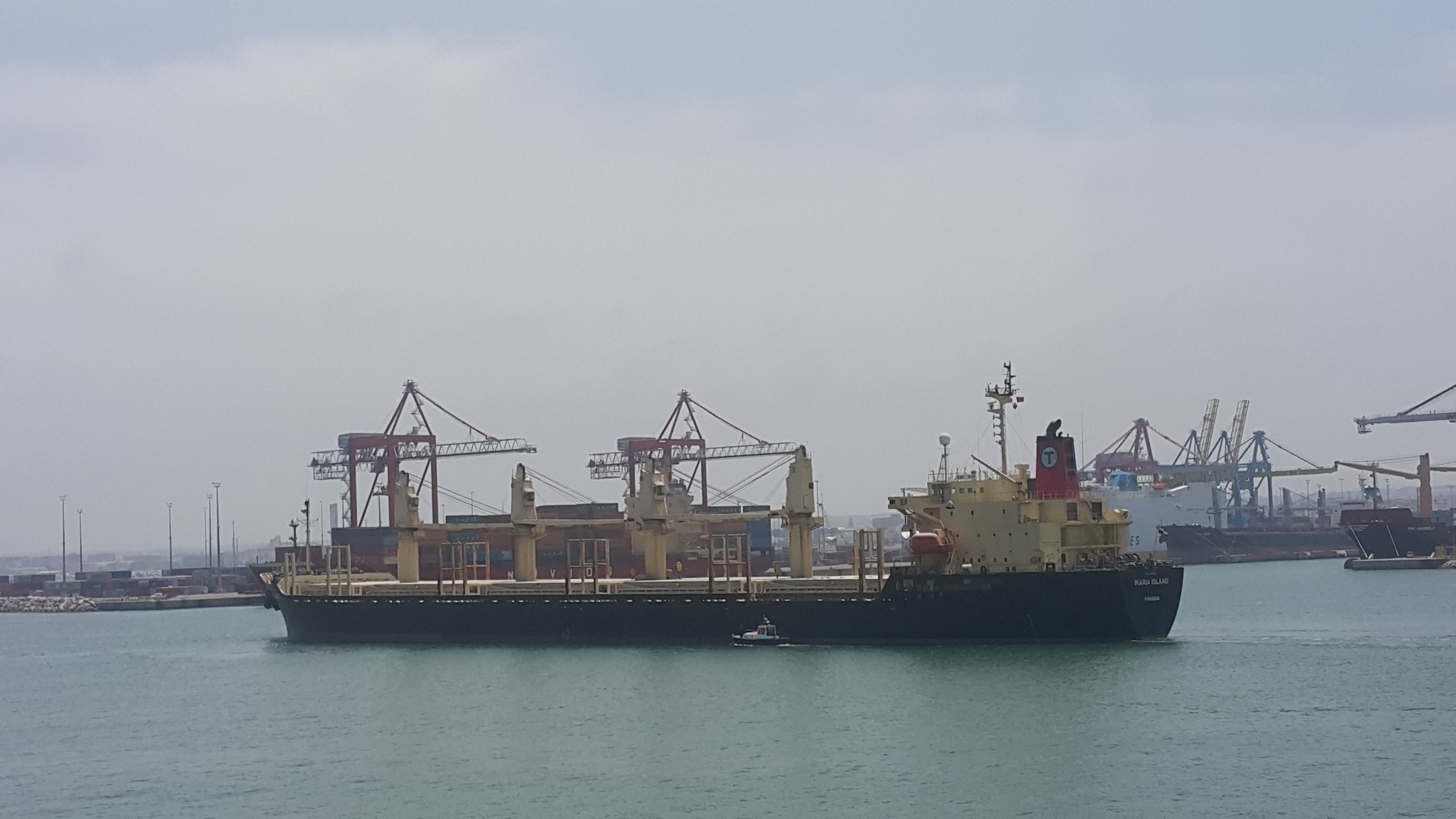
- The ship as Ikaria Island in 2021

History
- Name: Rubymar; Ikaria Island (2020); Chatham Island (2009); Ken Shin (1997)
- Namesake: Red Sea; Icaria; Chatham Island
- Owner: Golden Adventure Shipping S.A.
- Port of registry: Belize
- Builder: Onomichi dockyard Kobe, Japan
- Completed: 1997
- Identification: IMO number: 9138898; MMSI number: 312168000; Callsign: V3FW
- Fate: Sunk on 2 March 2024 after being struck by Houthi anti-ship ballistic missile on 18 February 2024

General characteristics
- Class & type: Bulk carrier
- Tonnage: 19,420 GT
- Length: 171 m (561 ft 0 in)
- Beam: 27 m (88 ft 7 in)
- Crew: 24

MV Rubymar was a Belize-flagged Handymax-size bulk carrier cargo ship completed in 1997. She previously sailed under the names Ken Shin from 1997, Chatham Island from 2009, and Ikaria Island from 2020, before being renamed Rubymar. On 18 February 2024, the ship was struck by a Houthi anti-ship missile during the Red Sea crisis while carrying a cargo of fertilizer. After being adrift for weeks, the ship sank on 2 March as a result of the strike, becoming the first vessel lost due to a Houthi attack during the crisis. The wreck poses a risk to navigation of the Red Sea, and also has the potential to cause environmental damage due to the leakage of its oil and fertilizer.

== Characteristics ==
Rubymar was a Handymax-size bulk carrier cargo ship of 19,420 gross tonnage (GT) and 32,211 tons deadweight (DWT). It was 171 metres (561 ft 0 in) long and 27 m (88 ft 7 in) wide, with a draft of 10.4 m (34 ft 1 in). It was equipped with a Mitsubishi engine plant that supplied 7,059 kW (9,466 hp) of power. The ship was valued at $4.82 million in February 2024 before its sinking.

=== Ownership ===
The ownership of Rubymar was complex in 2024. The ship sailed under the flag of Belize, but was managed by the Lebanese GMZ Ship Management Company S.A., for Golden Adventure Shipping S.A., of Majuro, Marshall Islands, who offer a Southampton, United Kingdom, correspondence address for a Lebanese owner.

== History ==
The ship was built in 1997 by the Onomichi dockyard in Kobe, Japan. It was called Ken Shin in 1997, Chatham Island in 2009, and Ikaria Island in 2020, before being renamed Rubymar. In 2022, it took part in the Black Sea Grain Initiative, carrying 35,000 tons of wheat from Ukraine to Egypt during the Russian invasion of Ukraine.

=== Red Sea attack ===
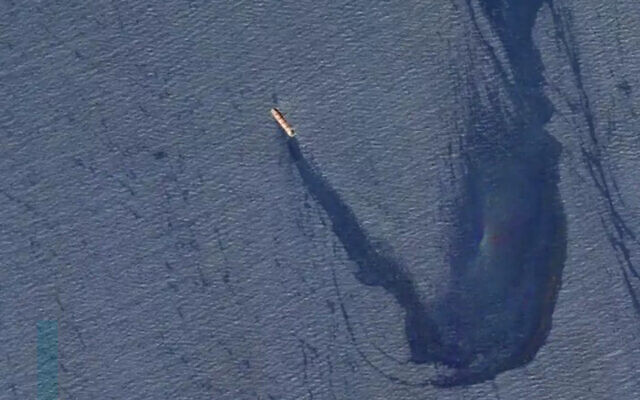
Aerial view of oil spilling from the Rubymar after the attack

Rubymar was transiting through the Red Sea in February 2024, transporting a cargo of fertilizer from the United Arab Emirates to Bulgaria. The United States Central Command announced that on 18 February, Houthi forces launched two anti-ship missiles at the ship, one of which struck it and caused severe damage. A container ship, the Singapore-flagged Lobivia, and an Operation Prosperity Guardian warship responded to the incident. Lobivia evacuated all 24 crewmembers of Rubymar and took them safely to Djibouti.

The ship was abandoned in the vicinity of the Bab-el-Mandeb following the attack, but did not fully sink. Despite dropping its anchor, by 26 February it had moved more than 70 kilometres (43 mi) while not under command. During this time, its dragging anchor may have damaged several undersea internet cables, disrupting up to a quarter of the internet traffic through the Red Sea's underwater network. In the aftermath of the missile strike, a 29-kilometre (18 mi) long oil slick developed, with continuing oil spillage contributing to what Central Command called an environmental disaster. Furthermore, it was predicted that the cargo of fertilizer could contribute to further damage by causing an algal bloom in the coastal regions near the ship.

Salvage and towing operations were stymied by political barriers in the weeks following the attack. While the United States Navy offered to help tow Rubymar, the nearest port of Djibouti refused to accept the ship because of the risk of explosion from its cargo of fertilizer. Houthi leader Mohammed al-Houthi stated that the group would only allow the ship to be towed if humanitarian aid was supplied to Gaza. By 28 February, the ship was still adrift and waiting to be towed into port, possibly in Saudi Arabia or Yemen.

=== Sinking ===
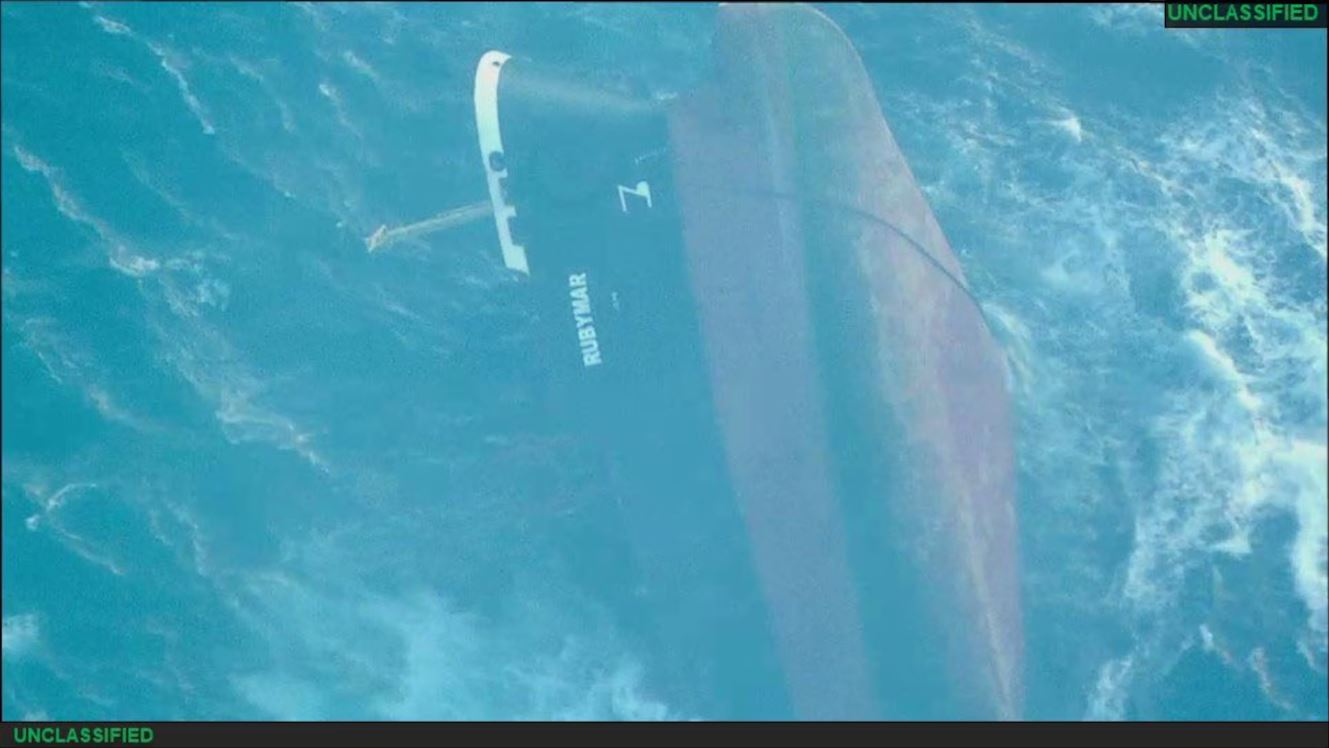
MV Rubymar sinks in the Red Sea on 2 March 2024

On 2 March 2024, the internationally recognized Government of Yemen reported that Rubymar sank in the Red Sea. A combination of foul weather and strong winds caused the ship, which was already partially submerged, to fully sink. Rubymar is the first ship to be sunk by Houthi forces since the start of their attacks in the Red Sea.

=== Environmental impact ===
Concerns over the potential for environmental damage were renewed following the ship's sinking. The Yemeni government's environmental protection authority warned that the dual threats of the ship's fuel and its fertilizer cargo could impact up to half a million people who depend on fishing in the Red Sea to make a living. The United States Embassy to Yemen echoed the environmental concerns, as well as pointing out the vessel's "risk to safe navigation" for other ships moving through the area.

By 18 March, the International Maritime Organization (IMO) was still unable to conduct any salvage operations. It stated that while the cargo of fertilizer was contained, the oil slick was the main source of damage to the environment. In July, the IMO made a request for contributions of equipment to respond to the ongoing oil spill, asking for a remote operated vehicle and additional supplies.
