= Red Sea crisis =

Houthi involvement in the Gaza war

- Part of the Iran–Israel proxy conflict, the Middle Eastern crisis (2023–present), and the Yemeni civil war (2014–present)
- A map of Houthi activity near the Yemeni coast, prior to the 2026 Yemen offensives: Houthi-controlled Yemen (SPC); Government of Yemen (PLC); Houthi attacks (red) and hijackings (blue)
Date	19 October 2023 – present (2 years, 11 months, 2 weeks and 1 day)
Location	Red Sea, Gulf of Aden (esp. Bab-el-Mandeb), Arabian Sea, Mediterranean Sea, (Note: The Houthis have claimed several attacks on ships in the Mediterranean, though none have been confirmed.) Israel, Saudi Arabia, Egypt, and Yemen
Status	Israeli Port of Eilat enters bankruptcy and shuts down; Disruption of international maritime trade and supply chain; Beginning of Operation Sankalp on 14 December 2023; Beginning of Operation Prosperity Guardian on 18 December 2023; Missile strikes against Houthi-controlled territory started in January 2024; Beginning of Operation Aspides on 19 February 2024; Repeated missile and drone attacks prompted Israel to intervene in 2024 and 2025; Intensification of US airstrikes in March–May 2025 but halted after a ceasefire brokered by Oman; Attacks halted with the beginning of the Gaza peace plan on 10 October 2025; Resumption of attacks against Israel on 28 March 2026 and Saudi Arabia on 13 July 2026 as part of the 2026 Iran war; Renewed clashes began between Yemeni government forces and the Houthis in September 2026

Belligerents
Axis of Resistance; SPC (Houthis) (Note: Political legitimacy of all Houthi-led government bodies has been rejected by the United Nations, rival Yemeni factions, the Gulf Cooperation Council, and the United States.); Iran (Note: Multiple sources indicate that the Iranian government has deployed military personnel to Houthi-controlled Yemen who are actively involved in attacks on commercial shipping.); Hezbollah; Islamic Resistance in Iraq	Israel Saudi Arabia; Yemen (PLC) Prosperity Guardian: United States; United Kingdom; Australia; Bahrain; Canada; Denmark; New Zealand; Norway; Seychelles; Singapore; Sri Lanka; Aspides: European Union; Belgium; Estonia; Finland; France; Germany; Greece; Italy; Latvia; Netherlands; Sweden; Independent Patrols: China; Egypt (Note: Egypt has not joined the coalition against the Houthis, but has shot down Houthi missiles over their own territory.); India; Pakistan

Commanders and leaders
Abdul-Malik al-Houthi; Mahdi al-Mashat; Abdel-Aziz bin Habtour; Ahmed al-Rahawi X; Muhammad Ahmed Miftah; Muhammad al-Ghamari X; Yusuf al-Madani; Mohamed al-Atifi	Benjamin Netanyahu; Yoav Gallant; Israel Katz; Herzi Halevi; Eyal Zamir; Donald Trump; Pete Hegseth; Joe Biden; Lloyd Austin; Brad Cooper; George Wikoff; Keir Starmer; Rishi Sunak; Mohammed bin Salman

Units involved
- See order of battle

Strength
Yemeni Armed Forces (SPC) (Iran) 1 Alvand-class frigate (Iran) 1 intel ship	Naval assets: 2 Sa'ar 6-class corvettes; 1 Sa'ar 5-class corvette; 1 Nimitz-class aircraft carrier; 1 Ticonderoga-class cruiser; 1 Ohio-class submarine; 6 Arleigh Burke-class destroyers; 1 Wasp-class amphibious assault ship; 2 FREMM multipurpose frigates; 1 Horizon-class frigate; (Italy) 2 Orizzonte-class destroyer; 2 FREMM multipurpose frigates; 2 Type 45 destroyers; 2 Type 23 frigates; 1 Sachsen-class frigate; 1 Karel Doorman-class frigate; 2 Hydra-class frigates; 1 Iver Huitfeldt-class frigate; 1 De Zeven Provinciën-class frigate; 1 Hamilton-class patrol boat; 3 Kolkata-class destroyers; 2 Visakhapatnam-class destroyers; 2 Talwar-class frigates; 2 Tughril-class frigates; 2 Zulfiquar-class frigates; 1 Yarmook-class corvette; 1 Type 052D-class destroyer; 1 Type 054A-class frigate

Casualties and losses
Per Houthis: 134 killed; 314 injured; Per Sky News & PLC: 207+ killed (Note: 10 killed on 30–31 December, 75 killed on 12–22 January, 40 killed on 3–5 February, 11 killed on 11 March, 70 killed on 1 April, 1 killed on 8 April); 14 detained	3 soldiers killed (Note: Two Navy SEALs on 21 January 2024, one Navy sailor on 23 March 2024); 3 soldiers injured; At least 17 MQ-9 Reapers lost; (25 per Houthis); (United States) 3 F/A-18 Super Hornets lost
- 13 sailors killed and 17 injured (Note: Fatalities include one Vietnamese, one Russian, one Indonesian, three Pakistanis, and seven Filipinos: One injured on 22 February 2024; Three killed, four injured on 6 March 2024; One injured on 28 May 2024; One killed on 12 June 2024; One severely injured on 13 June 2024; One injured on 23 June 2024; Four killed, at least two injured on 7 July 2025; Two injured on 29 September 2025 (one succumbed to their wounds on 6 October); Four killed, six injured on 11 August 2026); 2 Yemeni Coast Guard personnel killed 2 Israeli civilians killed and 248 injured 1 WFP worker killed, 1 UN worker injured 319 Yemeni civilians killed and 1,143 injured 68 African migrants killed, 47 injured 3 Russian civilians injured 6 Egyptian civilians wounded 5 Palestinian civilians wounded
- Two ships have been hijacked and 36 crew members have been taken hostage by Houthi militants; one ship remains in Houthi custody, while one ship and all hostages have been released. At least 30 ships have been damaged by Houthi attacks. One UK-owned and three Greek-owned cargo ships sunk.

The Red Sea crisis (Note: Arabic: أزمة البحر الأحمر) is an ongoing armed conflict and maritime crisis instigated by the Houthis, an armed group in Yemen fighting a civil war against the country's internationally recognized government. The Houthis began launching missiles and armed drones at Israel in response to the Gaza war, and have seized or attacked dozens of merchant and naval vessels travelling through the Red Sea which they claimed are linked to Israel. These actions provoked a military response from Israel, as well as the United States and the United Kingdom. The crisis is linked to the Middle Eastern crisis, the Iran–Israel proxy conflict, and the Yemeni crisis.

Since 2014, the Houthi-led Supreme Political Council, who oppose the Saudi-backed government of Yemen and receive support from Iran, have controlled a considerable swath of the country's western territories, including most of the national Red Sea coastline. Shortly after the outbreak of the Gaza war, the Hamas-allied group began to launch missiles and drones at Israel. It has also fired on merchant vessels in the Red Sea, particularly in the Bab-el-Mandeb, the southern maritime chokepoint of the Red Sea (the northern chokepoint being the Suez canal), inflicting damage on the global economy. The group declared that it would not stop until Israel ceased military operations in Gaza.

The Houthis declared any Israel-linked ship was a target for attack, including US and UK warships, but they also attacked the ships of nations with no connection to Israel. The Houthis have attacked 178 vessels throughout their two-year blockade, according to the NGO Armed Conflict Location and Event Data, sinking four ships and killing nine sailors. To avoid being attacked, hundreds of commercial vessels were rerouted to sail around South Africa.

Houthi Red Sea attacks have drawn military responses from a number of countries. In January 2024, the UN Security Council adopted Resolution 2722, condemning the Houthi attacks and affirming freedom of navigation. The United States-led Operation Prosperity Guardian was launched to protect Red Sea shipping. From 12 January 2024, the US and UK led coalition air and missile strikes against the Houthis, while other countries are independently attacking Houthi vessels in the Red Sea. On 3 May 2024, Yemeni general Yahya Saree said, "We will target any ships heading to Israeli ports in the Mediterranean Sea in any area we are able to reach". On 6 May 2025, US president Donald Trump announced a cessation of US strikes as a result of a bilateral ceasefire between the US and the Houthis. The Houthis halted their attacks on international shipping and on Israel after the Gaza peace plan went into effect on 10 October 2025. Some major shipping corporations, such as Maersk, have since resumed their Red Sea routes, while others have held off due to the volatile situation. As of May 2026, daily traffic through the strait was around 31 ships per day, as it had been since January 2024, remaining below the pre-war level of 75 ships per day.

During the war on Iran by the United States and Israel, the Houthis threatened to escalate the conflict on 28 February 2026. A month later on 28 March, the Houthis resumed their attacks on Israel amidst the war against Iran. On 13 July, the group resumed its attacks against Saudi Arabia and by 20 July, they announced a blockade of Saudi Arabian ports and ships in the Bab-el-Mandeb in response to the ongoing Saudi-led intervention and blockade against Houthi-controlled Yemen. On 30 July 2026, Saudi Arabia, Turkey, Pakistan, Egypt, Bahrain, Qatar, Jordan, Kuwait, Bangladesh, Djibouti, Somalia, Yemen, Sudan, and Comoros formed the Multinational Maritime Defense Alliance to ensure the freedom of navigation through the Bab-el-Mandeb Strait, the Red Sea, and the Gulf of Aden.

== Background ==
=== Houthis within Yemen ===
The Houthi movement is an Iran-backed Zaydi Shia Islamist militant organization that exercises control over parts of Yemen, though it is not the country's internationally recognized government. The Houthi takeover in Yemen in 2014 resulted in the group's acquisition of the capital city of Sanaa, but the anti-Houthi Presidential Leadership Council remains recognized by the international community as Yemen's legitimate government.

After this conflict grew into an ongoing civil war, millions of residents were internally displaced, and a Saudi-led coalition responded by imposing a blockade of Yemen. These combined to shrink the economy by half and contributed to famine in Yemen since 2016, one of the worst in the world. The US military destroyed drones in Yemen's Houthi-held region and over the Red Sea due to perceived threats, exacerbating tensions in the conflict-ridden area. This comes amidst ongoing attacks by the Houthis and challenges to diplomatic efforts to end the Yemeni war.

=== Houthis and the Gaza war ===
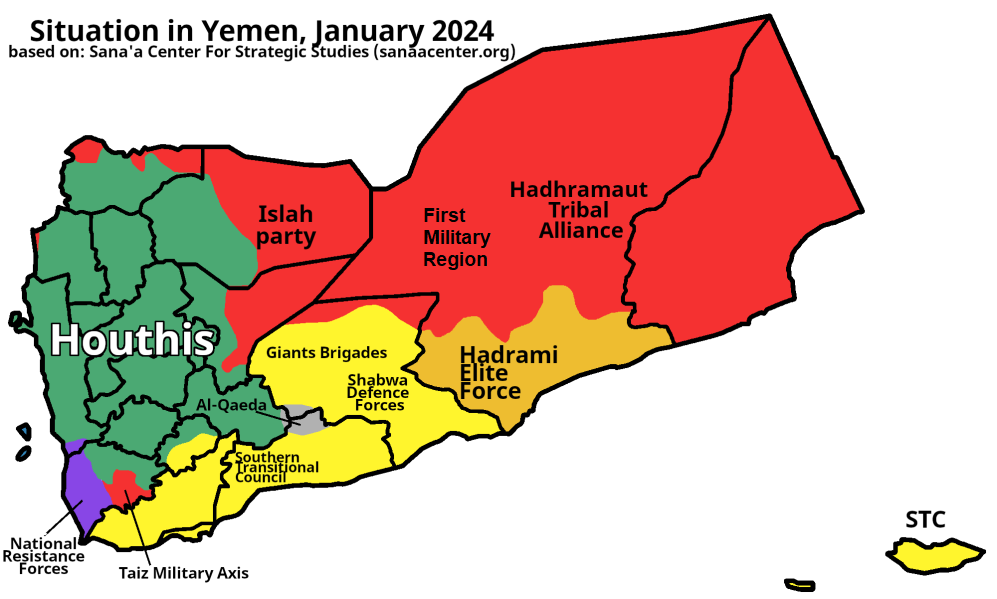
Areas controlled by the Houthi movement in 2024, colored green

Following the Hamas-led attack on Israel on 7 October 2023, which triggered the Gaza war, numerous Iran-backed militant groups across the Middle East (including the Houthis) expressed support for the Palestinians and threatened to attack Israel. Houthi leader Abdul-Malik al-Houthi warned the United States against intervening in support of Israel, threatening that such an intervention would be met with retaliation by drone and missile strikes. In order to end their attacks in the Red Sea, the Houthis demanded a ceasefire in the Gaza war and an end to the accompanying Israeli blockade of the Gaza Strip.

=== Weapons used by Houthi militants ===
According to Armament Research Services, Houthi weapons are mostly of Russian, Chinese or Iranian origin. They are known to use surface-to-surface missiles, artillery rockets, loitering munitions and unmanned aerial vehicles (UAVs). They have several missiles and UAVs capable of reaching Israel from Yemen:

- Toufan – a surface-to-surface missile, with a range of 1,800 km (1,100 mi).
- Cruise missiles – from the Iranian Soumar family, with strike ranges of about 2,000 km (1,200 mi).
- Quds-2 missile – supposedly with a range of 1,350 km (840 mi) but made to strike Israel.
- Samad-3 and Samad-4 – UAVs/loitering munitions with ranges of 1,800 km (1,100 mi) and further.
- Wa'id drones – similar to Iran's Shahed 136, loitering munition with a range of 2,500 km (1,600 mi).
- Naval drones – 7 metres (23 ft) unmanned surface vessels (USVs) laden with explosives.

=== Strait of Bab-el-Mandeb ===
The Bab-el-Mandeb Strait connects the Red Sea with the Gulf of Aden and the Indian Ocean and is therefore considered a trade artery. The corridor handles nearly 10% of global trade and roughly 5%-7% (approximately 6%) of global oil shipments. Threats and attacks can cause major shipping disruptions, forcing commercial vessels and oil tankers to avoid the route and reroute around Africa's Cape of Good Hope, adding weeks of travel time and higher costs.

== Timeline of events ==
Bab-el-Mandeb transits by cargo vessels
over 10,000 deadweight tonnage (approx.)

Before attacks

After first Houthi ship seizure/attack (19 November 2023)

After naval protection operation started (18 December 2023)

After US/UK attack on Yemen mainland (12 January 2024)

=== Early phase (2023) ===
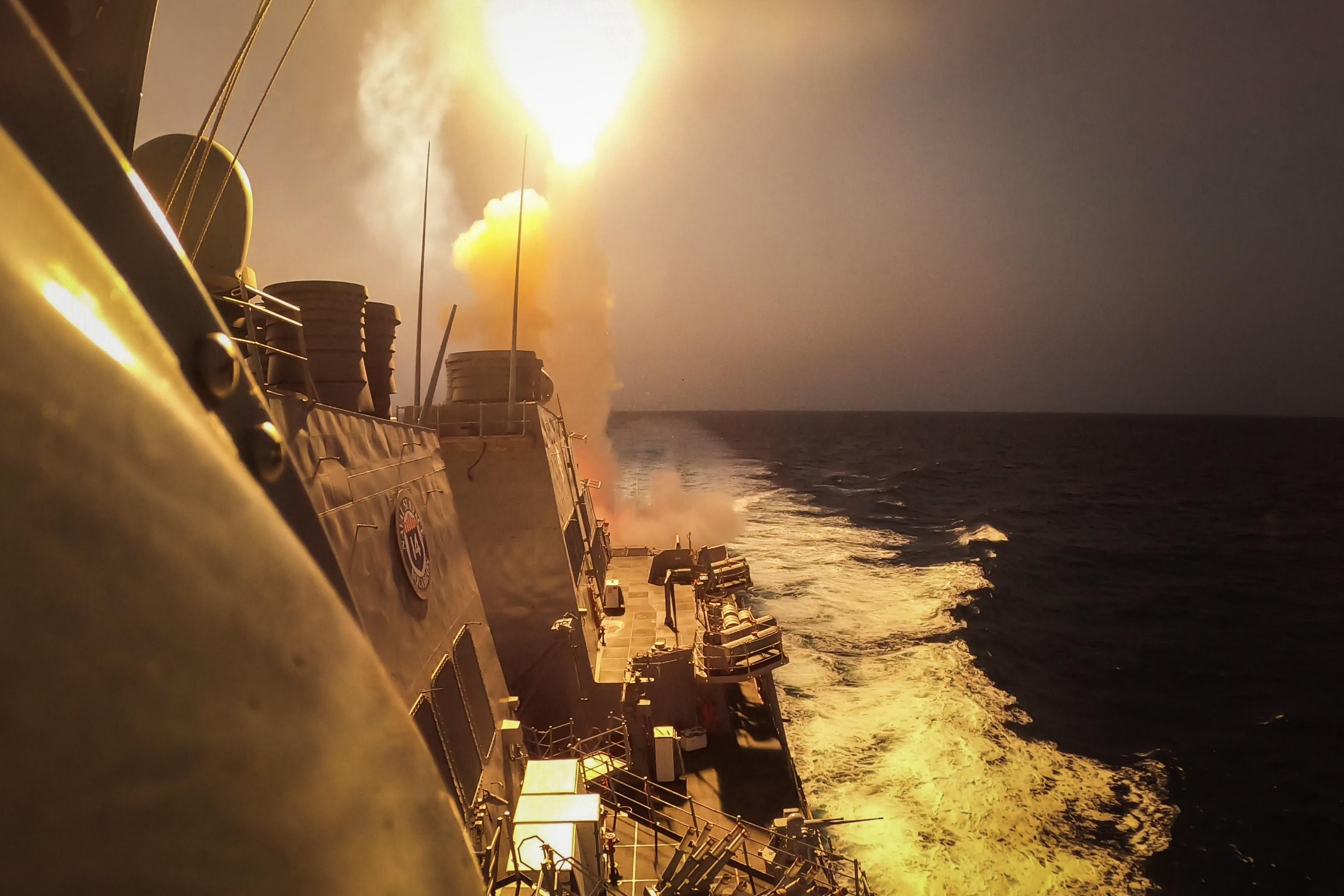
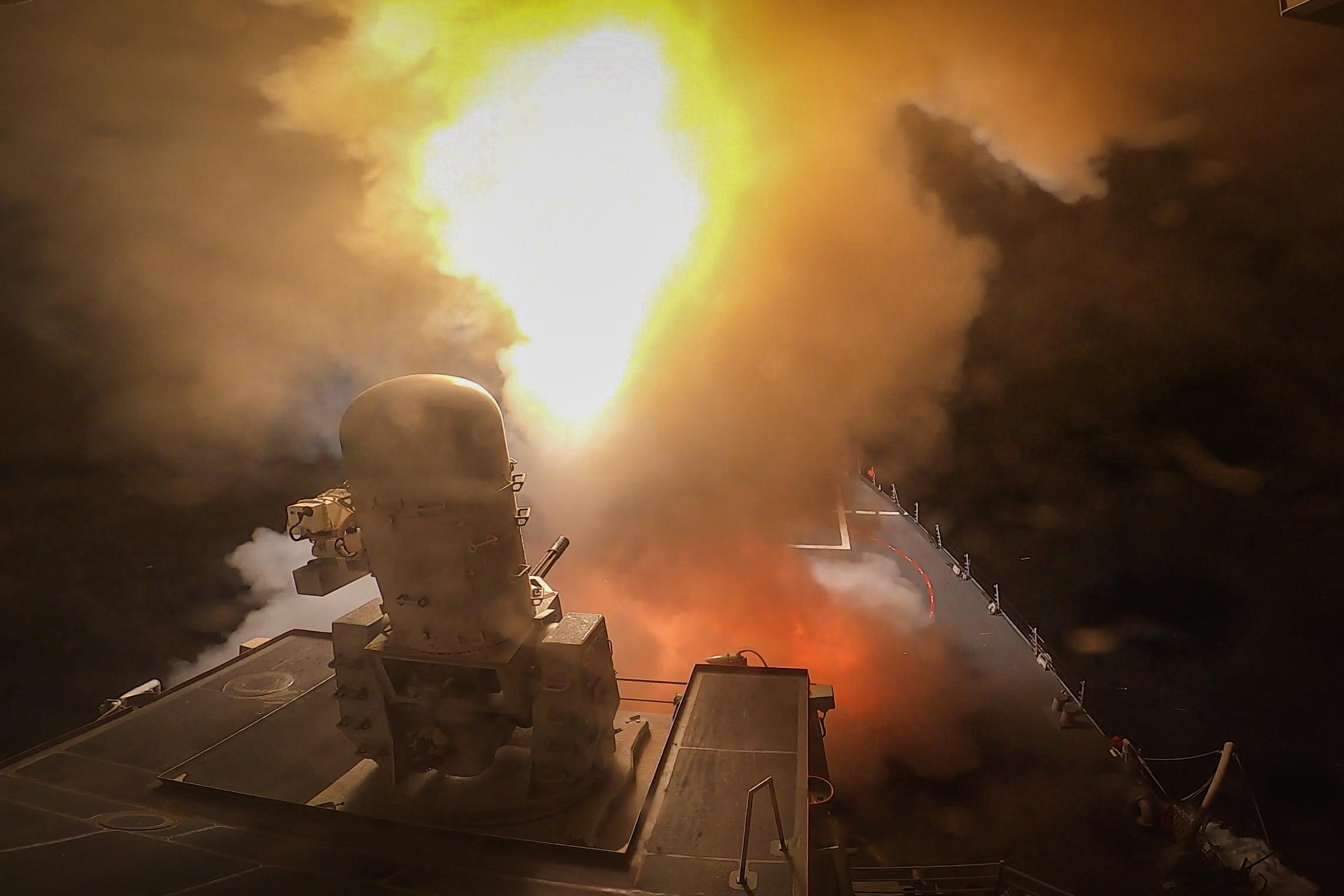
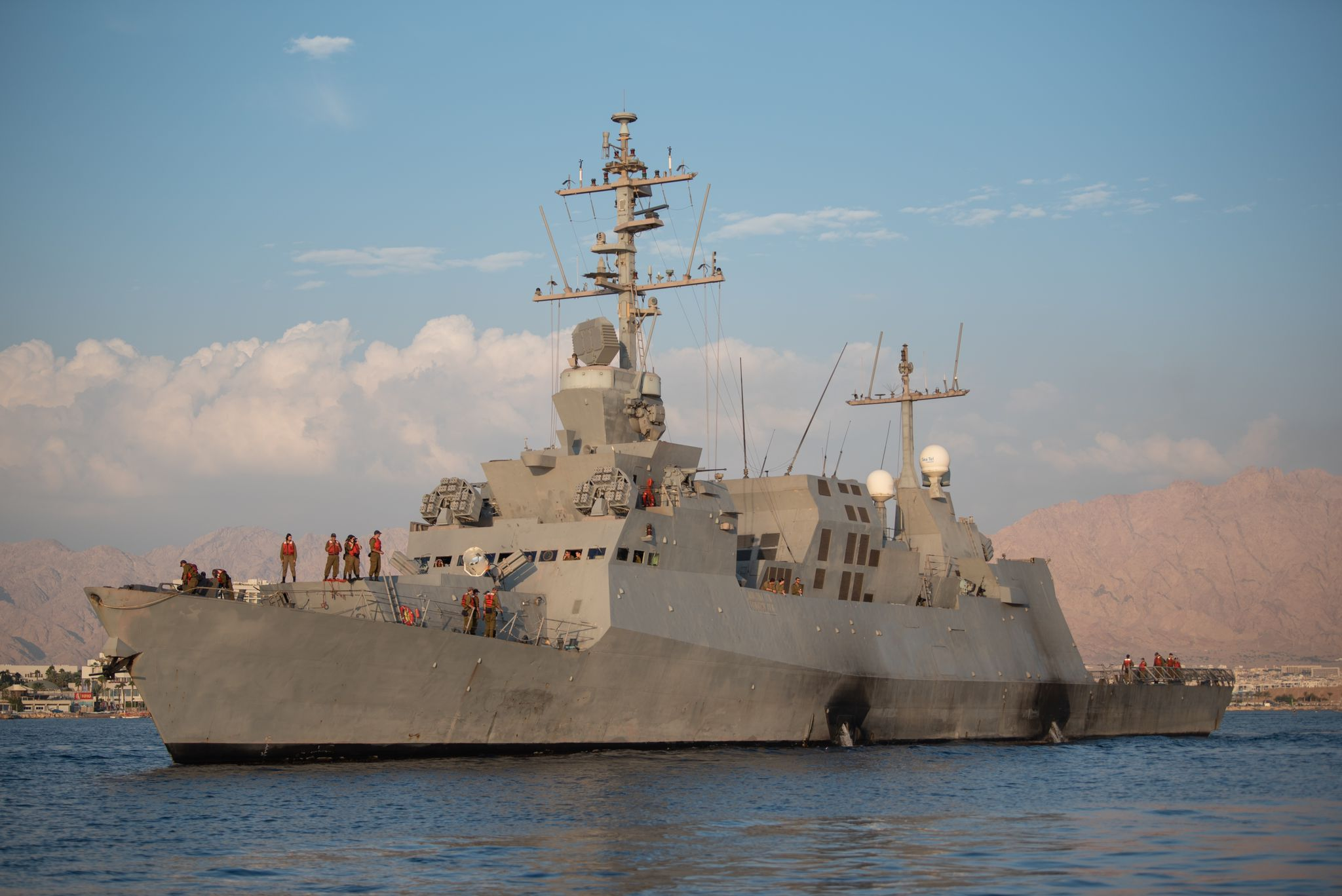
Top: USS Carney engages with Houthi missiles in the Red Sea, 19 October 2023
Bottom (left to right): Israeli missile boat patrolling the Red Sea, 1 November 2023; Israeli aerial interception over the Red Sea, 27 October 2023

The Houthis began firing missiles and drones at Israel in October 2023, alongside other members of the Iran-led Axis of Resistance. On 19 October 2023, American warship USS Carney intercepted four Houthi land-attack cruise missiles and 15 drones launched towards Israel over the Red Sea. On 27 October, the Houthis launched two drones targeting Israel, however they fell short of their target and instead struck Egypt, injuring six civilians in Taba. Israel's Arrow 2 and Arrow 3 air defense systems saw their first uses in combat on 31 October and 9 November respectively, intercepting Houthi weapons.

On 18 December, the United States announced the start of Operation Prosperity Guardian, a multinational naval protection force aiming to counter Houthi attacks on merchant vessels. On 31 December, several Houthis were killed by US Navy helicopters while attempting to attack the container ship Maersk Hangzhou in the Red Sea.

=== 2024 ===
==== US–UK strikes on Yemen and Operation Aspides ====
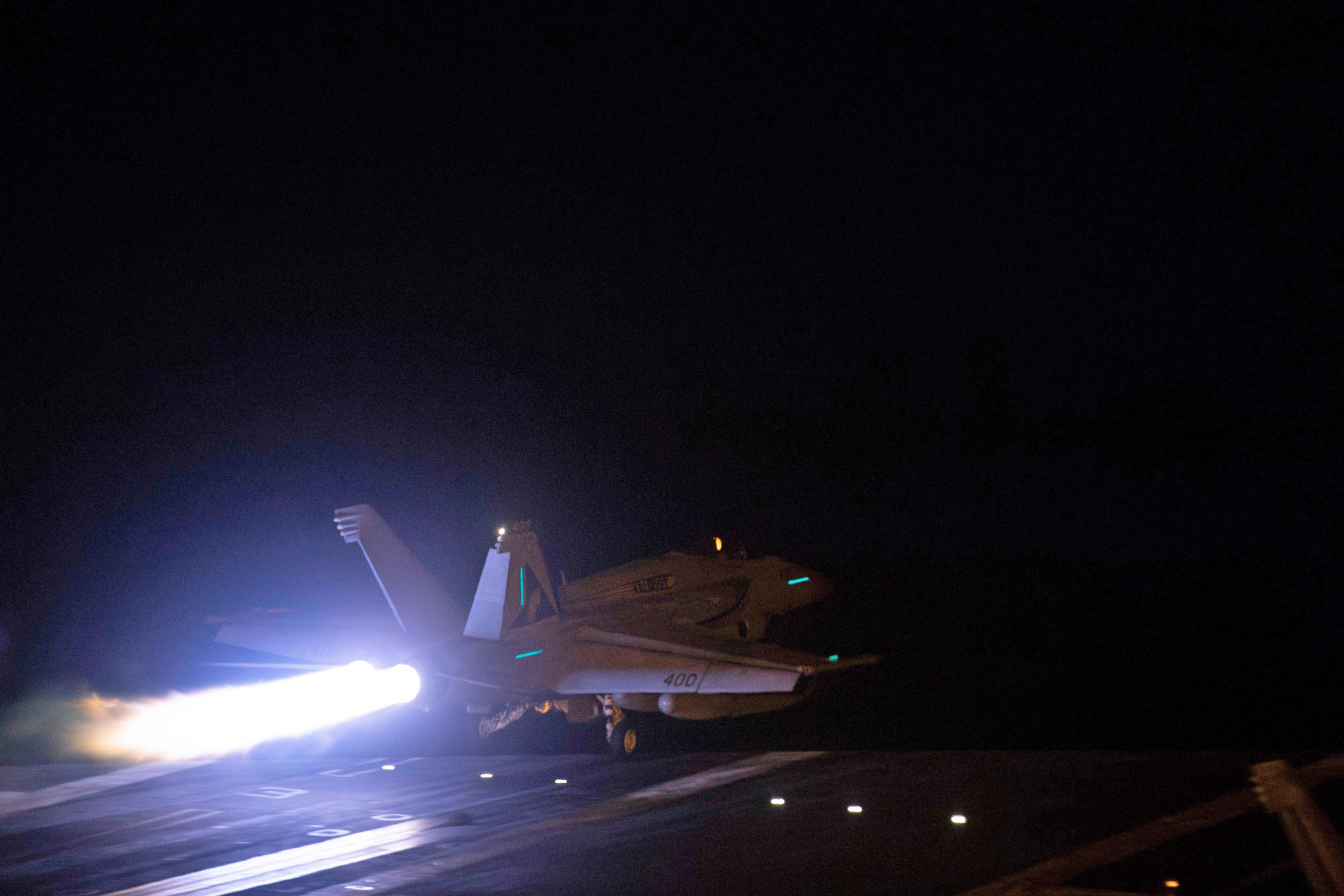
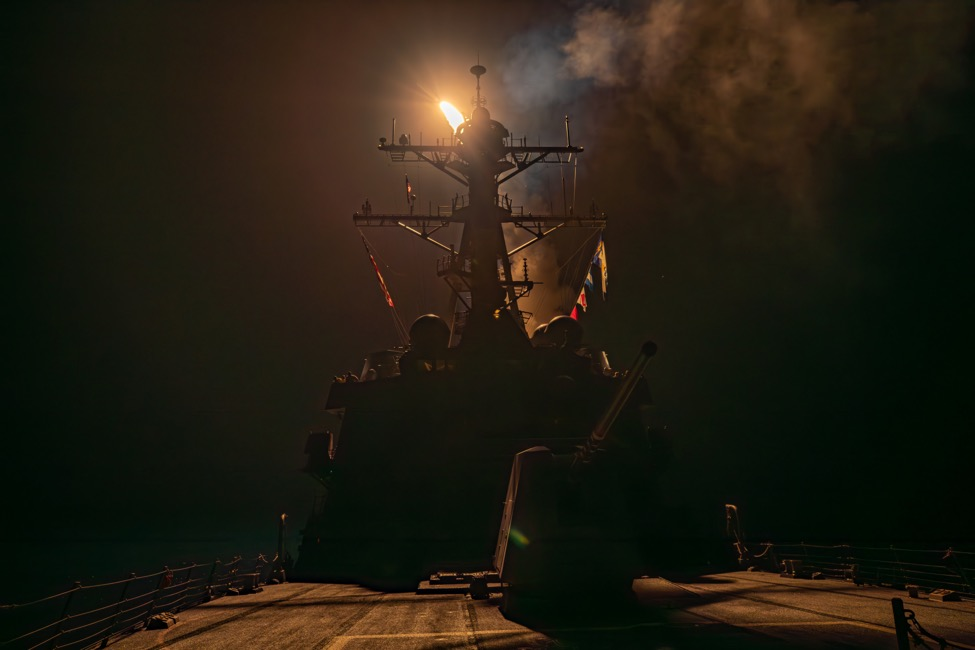
Top: Map of the 2024 missile strikes in Yemen
Bottom (left to right): US Navy F/A-18 fighter jet taking off prior to striking Yemen; a missile launch from a US naval vessel (12 January 2024)

On 12 January 2024, the US and UK, with support from several other countries, launched a campaign of air and missile strikes against Houthi targets in Yemen, codenamed Operation Poseidon Archer. On the first day of the operation, over 60 targets were struck and five Houthis were killed.

On 19 February, the European Union launched Operation Aspides, a naval mission with the goal of protecting international shipping from Houthi attacks. On 30 May, the US and UK conducted strikes against 13 Houthi targets across Yemen. The Houthis claimed that 16 civilians were killed and 40 more were injured.

==== Escalation between Israel and the Houthis ====
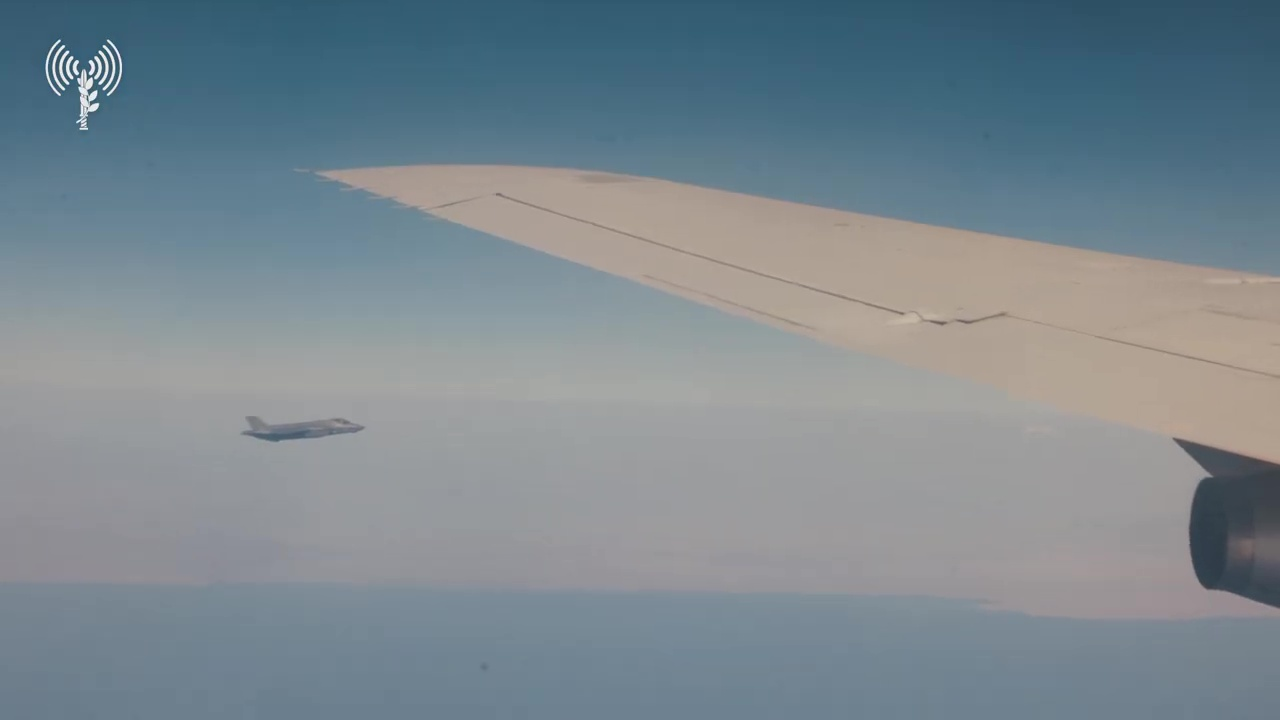
Israeli aircraft flying over the Red Sea during the 29 September 2024 Israeli attacks on Yemen

On 19 July, a Houthi Samad-3 drone struck a building in Tel Aviv, killing one civilian and wounding ten others. Israel responded on 20 July by conducting airstrikes on targets in the Houthi-controlled port city of Hodeidah, including an oil refinery and other infrastructure. At least six people were killed and 83 others were injured. Israel again struck Yemen on 29 September, hitting targets at the ports of Ras Isa and Hodeidah and killing several people.

On 19 December, Israel struck several targets at the ports of as-Salif, Ras Isa, and Hodeidah, as well as two power plants in Sanaa, killing nine people. On 26 December, Israel struck sites in Sanaa, including the Sanaa International Airport, and the ports of Ras Isa and Hodeidah. The attacks killed six people and injured dozens, including a United Nations staffer accompanying a delegation led by World Health Organization director Tedros Adhanom Ghebreyesus, who was at the airport during the strikes.

=== 2025 ===
==== Gaza war ceasefire (January) ====
The Houthis stated that they would pause their attacks on Israel and international shipping after a ceasefire was reached between Israel and Hamas in Gaza on 16 January 2025. US strikes on the Houthis also halted with the ceasefire agreement. On 22 January, the 25 crew members of the Galaxy Leader, an Israel-linked vessel hijacked by the Houthis in November 2023, were released in a deal mediated by Oman.

==== March–May United States attacks in Yemen ====
A US airstrike in Yemen on 15 March 2025

On 15 March, the US launched began a campaign of intense airstrikes against the Houthis codenamed Operation Rough Rider. On the first day of the operation, dozens of airstrikes hit Houthi targets across seven provinces in Yemen, killing 53 people. US president Donald Trump said that the attacks hit Houthi bases, missile systems, and leaders, and were intended to defend US shipping and military assets. At least 74 people were killed in a bombing at Ras Issa port on 17 April, marking the deadliest US strike during the operation. On 28 April, another strike on a detention center in Saada Governorate killed 68 African migrants and injured 47.

On 6 May, the US halted its attacks on the Houthis following a ceasefire agreement where the Houthis would no longer target American shipping. By then, the US conducted strikes on over 1,000 targets in Yemen. Airwars reported that the strikes killed 224 civilians, almost double the total civilian death toll of all previous US operations in Yemen since 2002 combined. The campaign cost the US over $750 million and saw the loss of seven MQ-9 Reaper drones.

==== Continuation of the Israel–Houthi conflict ====
On 4 May, a Houthi missile evaded Israeli air defenses and struck near a terminal of the Ben Gurion Airport in Tel Aviv, marking the Houthis' first direct hit near the airport; six people were lightly-to-moderately injured. The following day, Israel struck targets in Hodeidah, killing four people. Israel struck the Sanaa International Airport on 7 May, killing three people and destroying three airplanes belonging to Yemenia. The last remaining Yemenia airplane was destroyed in another strike on the airport on 28 May.

During the Twelve-Day War in June 2025, the Houthis coordinated their attacks on Israel with Iran, launching their first attack two days after the conflict began. On 14 June, Israel attempted to assassinate Houthi chief of staff Muhammad Abd al-Karim al-Ghamari in Sanaa; however, he survived. On 24 August, days after the Houthis fired a cluster munition at Israel for the first time, Israel conducted several strikes in Sanaa, including on the area of the Presidential Palace. At least ten people were killed and 102 others were injured. On 28 August, an Israeli strike hit a gathering of senior Houthi leaders in Sanaa, killing twelve members of the Houthi-controlled Cabinet of Yemen; including prime minister Ahmed al-Rahawi, and fatally wounding al-Ghamari.

A Houthi drone strike in Eilat on 24 September 2025

On 7 September, a Houthi drone struck the passenger terminal at Ramon Airport. On 10 September, Israeli strikes in Sanaa and Al Jawf Governorate killed 46 people and injured 165 others. Thirty-one journalists were killed in an attack on a media complex in Sanaa, making it the second deadliest attack on media workers recorded by the Committee to Protect Journalists.

On 18 September, a Houthi drone directly struck a hotel in Eilat. Another drone strike in Eilat injured 22 people, two seriously, on 24 September. The following day, Israel struck several Houthi targets in Sanaa in its largest strikes in Yemen to date. Israeli defense minister Israel Katz claimed that "many dozens" of Houthis were killed. The Houthi health ministry said that nine people were killed and over 140 were injured.

==== Gaza war ceasefire (October) ====
The Houthis paused their attacks on Israel and international shipping after a ceasefire in Gaza was reached on 10 October, and signaled that they had halted the attacks in an undated letter to Hamas's al-Qassam Brigades published in November 2025, but threatened to resume them if Israel broke the ceasefire. On 3 December, 11 crew members taken captive from the Greek-owned Eternity C cargo vessel were released by the Houthis.

On 25 December, the Houthis announced the deaths of several senior commanders, including Zakaria Abdullah Yahya Hajar, the head of their missile and drone unit. Although the circumstances of their deaths were not given, it was reported that they were killed by US airstrikes in March.

=== 2026 ===
On 28 February 2026, in response to the 2026 Iran war, the Houthis threatened to escalate the conflict and resume attacks in the Red Sea. The United Nations Special Envoy for Yemen Hans Grundberg urged the Houthis to refrain from escalatory actions, stating that “no party has the right to drag the country into a broader conflict that would bring more suffering to the Yemeni people."

The Houthis continued to make more statements supporting Iran but avoided resuming hostilities, not wanting to open multiple fronts in the current Yemeni civil war, which has been waging since 2014 and to focus on ending the conflict with Saudi Arabia. UK's The Times reported on 16 March that the Houthis are awaiting an Iranian signal to resume attacks if US military actions weaken Iran’s control of the Strait of Hormuz. Despite disruptions, the Bab el-Mandeb remains the only viable oil route, with around 30 tankers near the Saudi port city of Yanbu currently within Houthi strike range, and Houthi forces remaining generally passive.

Around 20 March, Senior Houthi politburo member Mohammed al-Bukhaiti said that the group was considering a naval blockade and would specifically target vessels belonging to "aggressor countries" involved in military actions against Iran, Iraq, Lebanon, and Palestine, describing it as a strategic measure to support Iran's ongoing confrontation with the US and Israel.

On 28 March, the Houthis launched a ballistic missile at Israel, joining the war. The Houthis later warned that the closure of the Bab-el-Mandeb was "likely" and threatened to do so if the conflict against Iran and Lebanon escalated sharply, or if the Gulf Arab states joined the war. Following the declaration of the 2026 Iran war ceasefire, Houthi leader Abdul-Malik al-Houthi called it as a "great victory" for Iran and the Axis of Resistance, while warning of further attacks depending on future developments.

On 13 July, Saudi Arabia and the allied internationally-recognised Presidential Leadership Council government of Yemen attacked the Sanaa International Airport to prevent an Iranian plane from landing. The Houthis launched a missile attack on Saudi Arabia in response, marking the first time the group attacked the country since March 2022.

On 20 July, the Houthis declared a blockade of Saudi Arabian ports and ships in the Bab-el-Mandeb for its "aggressive siege" against Yemen, including "plundering our resources and imposing a comprehensive blockade on our ports and airports by land, sea, and air," for nearly 12 years. Following the announcement, two tankers carrying Saudi oil through the Bab-el-Mandeb and a third en route to Yanbu diverted course. The number of diverted vessels rose to seven by 22 July. That same day, the US Navy's Joint Maritime Information Center warned that the Houthis had finished stationing missiles and drones near the Bab-el-Mandeb in preparation for attacks on shipping. On 24 July, the Houthi foreign ministry announced that Saudi Arabia had conducted airstrikes on Hodeidah. The Houthis responded by launching missiles and drones at Saudi Aramco facilities in Yanbu and Jizan.

On 10 September, the Houthi forces captured the districts of Hays and Al Khawkhah in Hodeidah province, as well as the town of Mokha in western Taiz province. The Presidential Leadership Council said that its forces had retreated toward the Dhubab district near the Bab el-Mandab strait. The Houthis also captured the Hanish Islands in Hodeidah governorate, and the strategically located Dhubab district with Perim island in the Bab el-Mandeb strait.

== Houthi attacks on commercial vessels ==
Houthi forces began attacking shipping vessels affiliated with Israel passing through the Red Sea on 19 November 2023. By February, 40 vessels had been attacked. Global shipping companies, which had typically sailed through the Red Sea, as well as the Suez Canal, instead moved to position their vessels around the Cape of Good Hope, off the Cape Peninsula, South Africa. Between November and December 2023, a 1.3 percent decrease in global trade resulted from Houthi attacks on commercial shipping in the Red Sea. By March 2024, over 2,000 ships had diverted routes away from the Red Sea, making costlier voyages, since the first Houthi attack the previous November.

Initial Houthi pledges to target any ship with links to Israel were followed by attacks on ships connected to over a dozen nations, as well, stated, in January 2024, as avenging "American-British aggression against our country". US Central Command responded that the Houthis attacks "have nothing to do with the conflict in Gaza" and that Houthis had "fired indiscriminately into the Red Sea", targeting ships, and impacting more than 40 nations. On 3 May 2024, the Houthi-aligned Yemeni Armed Forces SPC military spokesperson Yahya Saree announced, in a televised speech, that "We will target any ships heading to Israeli ports in the Mediterranean Sea in any area we are able to reach".

== Issues ==
=== Disinformation ===
The Houthis and their supporters have engaged in a disinformation campaign. According to the U.S. Navy, these false claims to undermine efforts to secure "freedom of navigation" in the Red Sea and surrounding waters by the United States and its allies and to gain recognition as a regional power. On 1 February 2024, the Houthis claimed an attack on a US ship named KOI, but maritime sources told BBC that it was false. Hezbollah-affiliated news outlets such as Islam Times and Al Mayadeen have backed false claims by the Houthis. On 28 January, Islam Times released footage of the 2021 X-Press Pearl fire, purporting it displayed the aftermath of a Houthi attack on a British ship. Three days later, Al Mayadeen reported that the Houthis accurately struck USS Gravely, but the claim was rejected by US officials.

Social media users on platforms such as X have published old or doctored images and videos falsely claiming them as Houthi attacks. In February 2024, users on X posted the 2018 sinking of the USS Racine (LST-1191) and the X-Press Pearl disaster, claiming they showed the Houthi attacks on the Star Nasia and Morning Tide. In June 2024, users posted satellite images of the USS Dwight D. Eisenhower with damage digitally edited onto it, claiming that it was the result of a Houthi attack. Other mislabeled or digitally edited photographs and videos were also published purporting damage to the aircraft carrier, though some were satire.

Footage from the Czech-based video game Arma 3 has been used to spread disinformation about the conflict, with Russian websites such as The Intel Drop and Pravda publishing gameplay, falsely claiming it showed attacks on the USS Dwight D. Eisenhower. The video game's developers, Bohemia Interactive, said that action taken against the videos was ineffective, saying: "With every video flagged, debunked, or taken down, ten more can be uploaded each day." Footage from the video game has also been misrepresented as attacks on shipping and a US fighter jet being shot down by the Houthis over Sanaa.

=== Foreign involvement ===
==== Iran ====
Reuters, citing unnamed Iranian sources and "a security official close to Iran", has claimed that Iranian personnel are in Yemen, working with Hezbollah militants. Their role involves directing and overseeing Houthi attacks on commercial shipping. The sources also stated that Iran has escalated its provision of advanced drones, anti-ship cruise missiles, precision-strike ballistic missiles, and medium-range missiles to the Houthis, since the outbreak of the Gaza war.

US officials told Semafor that commanders and advisors from Iran's Revolutionary Guards are currently stationed in Yemen, and are directly involved in the Houthi attacks on commercial traffic in the Red Sea. The IRGC has also stationed missile and drone trainers and operators in Yemen. The Qods Force, has overseen the transfer of the attack drones, cruise missiles, and medium-range ballistic missiles which have been used in the strikes on Red Sea and Israeli targets in recent weeks.

According to Western intelligence officials, the Iranian Islamic Revolutionary Guard Corps placed an intelligence gathering ship to guide Houthi attacks on ships that switch off radios and identifiers. According to the Institute for the Study of War, this was likely MV Behshad, which had replaced MV Saviz (which had been used to supply weapons and intelligence to the Houthis until it came under an Israeli limpet mine attack in April 2021). The Iranian frigate Alborz later also entered the Red Sea.

In July 2024, the Defense Intelligence Agency reported that the Houthis used an Iranian-made missile in their attack on the Norwegian-flagged Strinda on 11 December 2023. Features of Iran's Tolu-4 turbojet engine, used in their Noor missile, were found in the debris. An insurance group earlier stated that an Iranian-made missile was used after examining debris aboard the vessel.

NBC News, citing two US officials, reported in September 2024 that Iran was directly assisting the Houthis with targeting and attacking American MQ-9 Reaper drones, several of which were shot down or damaged during the Red Sea crisis. The officials did not elaborate on how Iran was helping the Houthis, but Michael Knights of the American think tank Washington Institute for Near East Policy said the Houthis received Iranian surface-to-air missiles, such as the 358 and SA-2, that allowed them to improve their air defenses and target US drones.

==== North Korea ====
Voice of America reported that North Korea may have shipped weapons to the Houthis via Iran based on Hangul writing that was found on Houthi-launched missiles.

==== China ====
Two China-based companies were sanctioned by the US in 2024 for providing "dual-use materials and components needed to manufacture, maintain, and deploy an arsenal of advanced missiles and unmanned aerial vehicles (UAVs) against U.S. and allied interests." A report by the Foundation for Defense of Democracies stated that the Houthis were using weapons made in China for their attacks on shipping in the Red Sea in exchange for Chinese ships having safe passage through the Sea. Another report from Israel's i24 News stated that China provided the Houthis with "advanced components and guidance equipment" for their missiles. According to the United States Department of State, Chinese state-owned Chang Guang Satellite Technology Corporation provides geospatial intelligence to the Houthis to target U.S. warships in the Red Sea.

==== Russia ====
In July 2024, The Wall Street Journal reported that US officials saw increasing indications that Russia was considering arming the Houthis with advanced anti-ship missiles via Iranian smuggling routes in response to US support for Ukraine during Russia's invasion. However it did not follow through due to pushback by the US and Saudi Arabia. In August 2024, Middle East Eye, citing a US official, reported that personnel of Russia's GRU were stationed in Houthi-controlled parts of Yemen to assist the militia's attacks on merchant ships. In October 2024, The Wall Street Journal reported that Russia had provided intelligence to the Houthis for targeting commercial ships.

=== War crimes ===
The Houthis have claimed they would target ships that had no military function, which would be a war crime, according to Human Rights Watch (HRW) and others. The HRW also noted that the detention of captured crews could be considered hostage-taking if they are detained to compel a third party to do or abstain from any act as a condition for the hostage's release or safety. Hostage-taking is a violation of international humanitarian law and a war crime. A statement issued by the HRW called upon the militants to "end their attacks on civilians caught in the crosshairs of their declared war on Israel." The HRW called the Israeli strikes on Yemen in July 2024 a possible war crime since they were apparently an "indiscriminate or disproportionate attack on civilians". It also called the Houthi drone attack on Tel Aviv that occurred one day prior to the strikes a possible war crime since it deliberately or indiscriminately targeted civilians.

== Impact ==
A map of the Red Sea showing the Bab-el-Mandeb strait in the south and the Suez Canal in the north

=== Israel and Egypt ===
Houthi attacks have reduced shipping to Israel and local trade. Commercial shipping to Eilat has almost completely ceased. Commercial ships coming from Asia to Israel, as well as some commercial ships not destined for Israel, have started to go around Africa, which makes the journey three weeks longer and more expensive. By 21 December 2023, over 100 container ships had been rerouted to go around Africa, each adding around 6,000 nautical miles to the trip distance.

Insurance costs for commercial ships that go through the Red Sea have increased; some Israeli ships have seen an increase of 250%, and others were unable to get any insurance. While Israelis would face delays in the supply chain and price hikes, the effects on the Egyptian economy are more severe as shipping through the Suez Canal contributes nearly $9.4 billion to the Egyptian economy which is suffering from a debt crisis made worse by trade disruptions with Israel due to the war in Gaza.

In March 2024, Israeli media reported that half of the workers at Eilat Port were at risk of losing their jobs after the port took a major financial hit due to the crisis in the Red Sea. The Histadrut Labor Federation, the umbrella organization for hundreds of thousands of public sector workers, said port management announced it intended to fire half of the 120 Eilat Port employees. In July 2024, the port of Eilat declared bankruptcy and requested support from the Israeli government due to its activity decreasing by 85% due to the Yemeni blockade in the Red Sea. In July 2025, the port's bank accounts were frozen and all operations shut down. The annual revenue of the Suez Canal meanwhile declined to $7.2 billion for the 2023–24 financial year, down from about $9.4 billion the previous year.

=== Global economy ===
Major shipping companies suspended ship traffic through the Red Sea due to the attacks, including MSC, Maersk, CMA CGM, COSCO, Hapag-Lloyd, and Evergreen Marine Corporation. On 18 December, the British multinational oil and gas company BP also suspended all shipments through the Red Sea. Maersk, which holds about 14.8% of the market share in the global container shipping market, announced on 25 December 2023 that it would resume operations soon as a result of Operation Prosperity Guardian. By 30 December, Maersk had resumed Red Sea operations, but again paused them following the attacks on Maersk Guangzhou.

In May 2024, based on the second quarter of its fiscal 2024 figures, Maersk estimated a capacity loss of 15–20 percent across the industry due to the Red Sea crisis. On 12 January 2024, Tesla said it would suspend most production from its Grünheide factory, its only factory in Europe, for two weeks starting 29 January due to supply chain issues caused by Houthi attacks. Volvo Cars also said it would halt production from its plant in Ghent for three days starting the following week. Shell plc announced a hold on "transit" through the Red Sea.

On 18 December 2023, Evergreen Marine Corporation announced it was suspending its import and export service to Israel because of risk and safety considerations. COSCO, the fourth-largest shipping company, and its container shipping subsidiary OOCL similarly stopping all services to Israel in early January 2024. On 21 December, the CEO of the port of Eilat said the port has seen an 85% drop in activity since the Yemeni attacks on shipping in the Red Sea. Many ships instead took a safer route, going around Africa and the Cape of Good Hope, although this route incurs an extra ten days, spends more fuel, and requires more crew time. The suspension of a large volume of trade through the Red Sea led to a decrease in use of the Suez Canal, and was thus a blow to the Egyptian economy.

A considerable number of freighters have continued to transit, with mostly large container ships diverting away rather than other shipping, with the strait continuing to be heavily used by bulk carriers and tankers which are under different contract arrangements and often from countries supportive of Gaza's situation so perceiving a minimal risk from ongoing Houthi attacks. In the first week of January 2024 the average number of freighters active each day in the Red Sea included 105 bulk carriers and 58 tankers, down from 115 bulk carriers and 70 tankers the week before. In contrast, six of the ten largest container shipping companies were largely avoiding the Red Sea, with relatively few container ships transiting the Bab al-Mandeb strait from 18 December 2023.

In January 2024, following China Ocean Shipping Company, the fourth-largest shipping company, and its container shipping subsidiary OOCL stopping all services to Israel, a senior Houthi official said that Chinese and Russian vessels not connected with Israel will have safe passage. As of January 2024, most marine insurers require a warranty of no Israeli involvement to insure vessels for the Red Sea route, with some requiring warranties of no US or UK interest and no calls to Israeli ports in the last 12 months. Qatar has halted tankers of liquefied natural gas through the Bab al-Mandeb Strait after US-led airstrikes on Houthi targets in Yemen increased risks in the strait. Considering that Qatar is Europe's second-largest supplier of LNG, the long-term suspension of exports has raised concerns as the winter season begins in Europe.

On 16 January, the British multinational oil and gas company Shell suspended all Red Sea shipments indefinitely due to attacks on commercial vessels. Some ships traveling through the Red Sea began broadcasting "No contact Israel" on their automatic identification system in response to a Houthi request to vessels without ties to Israel. By February 2024, more than half of the United Kingdom's export businesses were affected by disruption to shipping in the Red Sea, with companies surveyed reporting that the costs of hiring containers increased by 300%. Businesses then stated that the crisis had also caused cashflow difficulties and shortages of components on production lines.

A UNCTAD analysis found that, from December 2023 to February 2024, spot container rates from Shanghai to Europe rose by 256% on average, mostly due to Houthi attacks on Red Sea shipping. Compare to the same period a year earlier, there were also 42% fewer cargo ships transiting the Suez Canal. In June 2024, the US Defense Intelligence Agency reported that the Houthi attacks caused a 90% decrease in container shipping through the Red Sea from December 2023 to February 2024. Additionally, the report said that 29 energy and shipping companies across 65 countries were affected and forced to change their shipping routes, most of them choosing to go around the Cape of Good Hope which adds an extra 11,000 nautical miles (20,000 km; 13,000 mi), ten days of travel, and US$1,000,000 in fuel costs to each voyage. The Russell Group estimated that goods worth around $1 trillion were disrupted due to Houthi attacks from October 2023 to May 2024 in the Red Sea.

The number of ship passing through the Suez Canal fell from 2,068 in November 2023 to about 877 in October 2024. Approximately 200 cargo ships transited the Bab el Mandeb Strait in the southern Red Sea near Yemen in February 2025 and global freight prices by March 2025 were still significantly higher than pre-Gaza War levels. As of May 2026, daily traffic through the strait was still significantly below pre-war levels. Daily traffic was about 75 ships per day until November 2023, when it began dropping, and has remained at about 31 per day since January 2024.

=== Sudan ===
The Red Sea crisis has had a significant impact on Sudan and it's ongoing civil war. The disruptions to Red Sea shipping has limited Sudan's ability to receive imports via Port Sudan, the country's primary trade hub, putting further strain on the country's already fragile economy. The Houthi attacks have held up shipments containing vital aid for Sudan, have made it more expensive for humanitarian agencies to operate in the country and have contributed to rising transport costs and exacerbated shortages of food and medical supplies.

The Sudanese director of the International Rescue Committee Eatizaz Yousif said the attacks made shipments which normally take one or two weeks take months to reach the country, since shipping carrying aid en route to Port Sudan has been forced to navigate around Africa, traverse through the Mediterranean, and then enter the Red Sea via the Suez Canal to reach their destination.

== Reactions ==
=== UN Security Council ===
On 10 January 2024, the UN Security Council adopted Resolution 2722. The resolution, sponsored by the US and Japan, condemned the Houthi attacks, affirmed freedom of navigation and the right of member states to defend their ships, and demanded that the Houthis immediately release the Galaxy Leader and its crew. The vote was 11–0, with four abstentions. Among the permanent five members of the Security Council, the US, UK, and France supported the resolution, and Russia and China abstained.

=== Israel and Egypt ===
In a speech at a manufacturing exposition following the incident of 27 October, President of Egypt Abdel Fattah al-Sisi urged all parties in the Gaza war to respect Egypt's sovereignty, and emphasized that the Egyptian Army was able to protect the country in case of any more attacks. In early December 2023, Israel called upon Western allies to respond to threats to maritime shipping from the Houthis; Israeli National Security Advisor Tzachi Hanegbi said that if threats continue, "we will act to remove this blockade." The Southern Transitional Council reportedly said in December 2023 that it was willing to cooperate with Israel to fight against the Houthis; however, Al-Islah expressed support for the Houthi response to the Gaza war, despite its opposition to Houthi actions in the Yemeni Civil War.

==== Houthi response ====
On 25 January 2024, Abdul-Malik al-Houthi stated, "Our battle aims to support the Palestinian people, and has no other goals," and said that the Houthi's operations would cease once food and medicine was reaching all of Gaza. On 30 January, Houthi Minister of Defence Mohamed al-Atifi stated, "We are prepared for a long-term confrontation with the forces of tyranny." A Houthi spokesperson stated on 4 February 2024, "When the world became alarmed by the bloodiness of what was happening against the Palestinian people, Washington was not ashamed to deny the occurrence of genocide. Anyone who can do that can easily deny the connection between what is happening in the Red Sea and Gaza."

=== Operation Prosperity Guardian: American-led military coalition ===
While the US Navy has shot down Houthi rockets and missiles in the Red Sea, it has not retaliated against those firing them. In December 2023, after discussions with allies, the US announced the creation of a multilateral naval task force of protective escorts for commercial vessels in the Bab-el-Mandeb strait and Gulf of Aden region. The operation, codenamed Operation Prosperity Guardian, was formally launched on 23 December 2023.

It is similar to past operations protecting commercial vessels from attack, including in the Persian Gulf and Strait of Hormuz during the "Tanker War" of the 1980s, and the ongoing maritime security operations of Combined Task Force 153, the US Navy-led task force based in Bahrain. The operation has also been compared to the successful multilateral naval campaign a decade earlier to combat Somali pirates off the Horn of Africa, although the Houthis, unlike the Somali pirates, enjoy Iranian support, and better equipment and technology, such as helicopters, drones, missiles, and speedboats.

==== Independent naval patrols for maritime security ====
France, Italy and India have all independently sent naval assets to the region, with the French frigate Languedoc intercepting drones launched from a Houthi-controlled port while Italy has sent the frigate Virginio Fasan under the Secure Mediterranean operation. India has also sent two Kolkata-class destroyers to strengthen maritime security in the Red Sea.

=== Pro-Palestinian protests ===
In mid-January 2024, reports indicated that pro-Palestinian demonstrators in London voiced support for Houthi militants. This occurred shortly after the UK and the US initiated strikes on Houthi targets in response to the group's assaults on ships. Some demonstrators were observed chanting slogans like, "Yemen, Yemen make us proud, turn another ship around," while others displayed signs with messages such as "Hands off Yemen", "Thanks Yemen", and "UK+US wants war. Yemen supports Palestine. Gaza wants to live".

=== International ===
- Bahrain: In January 2024, Bahraini King Hamad bin Isa Al Khalifa and Antony Blinken discussed the Houthi attacks and reaffirmed their shared commitment to ensure freedom of navigation. Bahrain was the sole Arab country to join Operation Prosperity Guardian.
- China: The Chinese Foreign Ministry said it was concerned about the Red Sea crisis and called for an end to the attacks. China abstained from UN Security Council Resolution 2722.
- Denmark: Denmark voiced its support for the US and UK strikes against the Houthis and warned them to halt their attacks on commercial shipping.
- Djibouti: Djibouti intensified coast guard patrols along the Bab-el-Mandeb amidst the crisis. Djibouti Minister of Foreign Affairs Mahamoud Ali Youssouf said that the attacks demonstrate "strong solidarity with the people of Palestine" and voiced support for the Houthis. Nevertheless, he called for the Houthis to end their attacks as they impacted the country's economy.
- France: France condemned Houthi attacks against commercial vessels and expressed its support for the adoption of UN Security Council Resolution 2722.
- Germany: Germany condemned Houthi attacks, describing them as violent and against international law. It said that the attacks are irresponsible and put the lives of crew members aboard vessels at risk.
- India: India held diplomatic talks with Iran and took measures to protect Indian exporters from the attacks, including increasing surveillance and providing protective escorts to Indian vessels.
- Iran: Iran voiced support for Houthi operations. It also condemned the strikes on Houthis in Yemen, calling them "arbitrary" and saying that they violated international law.
- Italy: Italy said that the Houthi attacks must cease without triggering an armed conflict.
- Japan: The Ministry of Foreign Affairs of Japan condemned Houthi intervention in freedom of navigation, and voiced support for the United States and other nations for fulfilling their responsibility in securing free and safe navigation. In November 2023, Japan said it was communicating with the Houthis and Israel to secure the release of the hijacked Galaxy Leader.
- Russia: Russia abstained from UN Security Council Resolution 2722 and proposed amendments that would have stripped the endorsement of Operation Prosperity Guardian and recognize the Gaza war as the root cause of the attacks. It also condemned the US and UK strikes on the Houthis.
- Saudi Arabia: Saudi Arabia called on Iran to work towards de-escalation in the region. It also urged the US to show restraint in its response to the Houthis.
- Somalia: Somali Ambassador to Kenya Jabril Ibrahim Abdulle said that the attacks could negatively affect Somalia's economy and voiced concern over the possibility of Al-Shabaab acquiring weapons from the Houthis via sea routes.
- United Arab Emirates: The UAE expressed deep concern over the consequences of the Houthi attacks and called them an "unacceptable threat".

== Analysis ==
On 7 August 2024, the head of United States naval efforts in the Middle East, Vice Admiral George Wikoff stated that the American and British approach to combat the Houthis in the Red sea crisis had failed to dissuade the Houthis and stop attacks on shipping through the region, arguing that strikes and defensive efforts had done little to change the Houthis' behaviour. A senior fellow at the Hudson Institute and former Navy submariner, Bryan Clark, said that the Red Sea Crisis presented "the most sustained combat that the U.S. Navy has seen since World War II — easily, no question." On 25 April 2024, CNN reported that the Houthis’ successful targeting of US Reaper drones significantly hampered the ability of America to gain intelligence over Yemen and eliminate Houthi militant leaders while failing to secure air superiority.

== See also ==
- 2026 Strait of Hormuz crisis
- Closure of the Suez Canal (1967–1975)
- Guanbi policy
- International reactions to the Gaza war
- List of islands in the Red Sea
- Piracy off the coast of Somalia
- Tanker war
- United States support for Israel in the Gaza war
  - Attacks on US bases during the Gaza war
