= 30 May 2024 attacks on Yemen =

Joint American and British airstrikes in Yemen

30 May 2024 Yemen strikes
- Part of US–UK airstrikes on Yemen amidst the Red Sea crisis and the Middle Eastern crisis (2023–present)
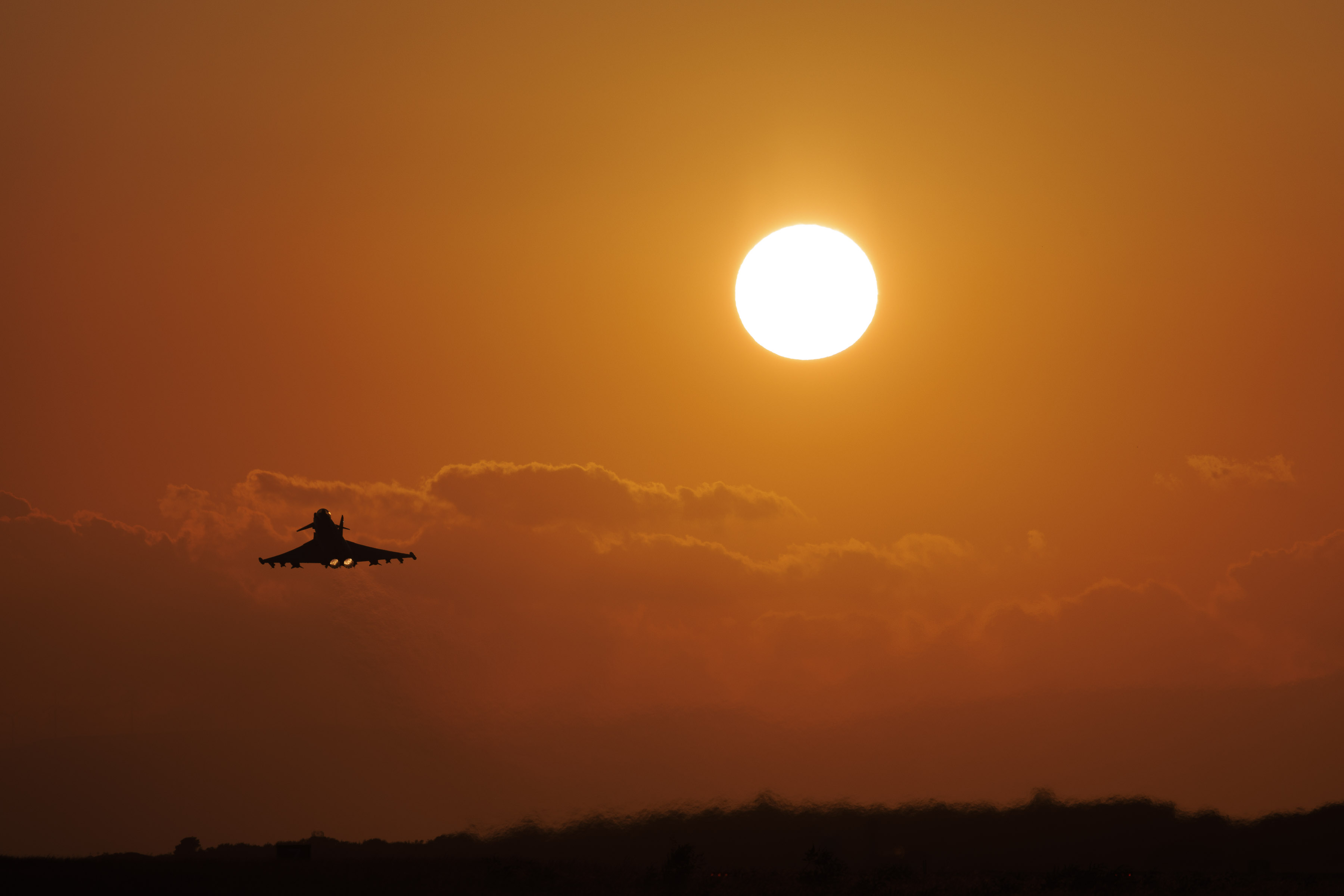
- A Royal Air Force Typhoon FGR4 taking off to conduct the mission
- Location: Houthi-controlled Yemen
- Target: Houthis; Yemeni Army (SPC); Yemeni Navy (SPC)
- Date: 30–31 May 2024 (1 day)
- Executed by: United States; United States Navy; F/A-18E/F Super Hornets; United Kingdom; Royal Air Force; Typhoon FGR4s
- Outcome: 13 Houthi targets struck
- Casualties: 16 killed and 42 wounded, including civilians

On 30 May 2024, the United States and United Kingdom conducted a joint set of airstrikes in Sanaa and Hodeidah, Yemen, killing 16 people and injuring 42. The United States and United Kingdom claimed that the strikes were targeting members of the Houthi rebel group; however, the Houthis claimed all those killed or injured in the strikes were civilians.

== Background ==
The Iran-backed Houthi movement, which gained control of much of Yemen during its civil war, launched attacks against international shipping demanding a halt to Israel's operations in Gaza, in which over 36,000 Palestinians were killed. During their campaign, over 50 ships were attacked, one ship was seized, and three sailors were killed. The attacks caused a decline in shipping in the Red Sea and Gulf of Aden.

In January 2024, the United States and United Kingdom began retaliatory strikes against the Houthis in Yemen, seeking to degrade their capabilities. The strikes killed 40 people and injured 35 others, according to the Houthis.

== Strikes ==
The US said the strikes targeted underground facilities, missile launchers, command and control sites, a Houthi vessel, and other sites. F/A-18 Super Hornet fighter jets took off from the aircraft carrier USS Dwight D. Eisenhower with participation from other warships in the Red Sea. Strikes took place outside of Sanaa and near its airport and in Taiz, where communication equipment was targeted. One of the strikes used a 5,000-pound GBU-72 bomb to destroy an underground facility. Royal Air Force Typhoon FGR4s, using Paveway IV guided bombs, conducted strikes on two drone ground control and storage facilities near Hodeidah and a command and control center in Ghulayfiqah. In total, 13 targets were struck in Yemen. Typhoon FGR4s

The Houthis said that strikes in Hodeidah targeted two civilian houses, the headquarters of Hodeidah Radio in the Al Hawak district, Ghalifa camp, and the Port of Salif. The strike on the radio building reportedly killed two people and wounded ten others. The Houthis claimed that all the casualties in Hodeidah were civilians, however a hospital worker in the city said that many militants were among the casualties, but did not give an exact number. Houthi-run al-Masirah TV reported six airstrikes in Sanaa: three on the al-Nahdayn Mountain, two in the Jarban area of the Sanhan district, and one near the Sanaa International Airport.

== Aftermath ==
The Houthis threatened to escalate attacks on shipping following the attacks. Houthi spokesperson Yahya Saree claimed missile and drone attacks on the USS Dwight D. Eisenhower, but US officials denied this. Houthi spokesperson Mohamed Abdelsalam called the strikes a "brutal aggression" towards Yemen for backing and providing support to Gaza in the Gaza war.

Iranian state media called the attacks a transgression of international law and human rights for minimizing "Yemen's sovereignty and territorial integrity", while Iranian foreign ministry spokesperson Nasser Kanaani stated: "The aggressor US and British governments are responsible for the consequences of these crimes against the Yemeni people."

== See also ==
- March–May 2025 United States attacks in Yemen
