= Houthis in the 2026 Iran war =

- Part of the 2026 Iran war and the Red Sea crisis
Date	28 March 2026 – present (5 months, 3 weeks and 5 days)
Location	Israel, Saudi Arabia, and Yemen; Red Sea, Gulf of Aden (esp. Bab-el-Mandeb), Arabian Sea
Status	Ongoing: Houthi blockade of Saudi Arabia; 2026 Yemen offensives

Belligerents
Houthis; In coordination with: Iran; Hezbollah	Israel Yemen (PLC); Saudi Arabia

On 28 March 2026, the Houthis in Yemen resumed their attacks against Israel, which were paused following the 2025 Gaza war ceasefire, and joined the 2026 Iran war by launching ballistic missiles against Israel. The Houthis stated that they had launched ballistic missiles targeting "sensitive" military sites in Israel, and vowed to continue the attacks "until the aggression on all resistance fronts stops."

Since 13 July 2026, the Houthis have engaged in a direct conflict with Saudi Arabia, imposing a naval blockade on the country, prompting Saudi Arabia to reportedly prepare for a renewed naval and ground offensive in Yemen. These actions directly threaten the fragile 2022 ceasefire brokered by the United Nations, raising imminent fears of a return to all-out civil war in Yemen.

== Background ==
Since the beginning of the Iran war on 28 February 2026 with airstrikes on Iranian targets by the United States and Israel, the Houthis repeatedly threatened to join the war. Having suspended their attacks in the Red Sea since the Gaza peace plan in October 2025, Houthi leader Abdul-Malik al-Houthi asserted that his group stood with Iran in the war and was prepared to take action if developments required it, stating, "Our hands are on the trigger whenever developments require it." The Houthis were previously struck by the United States and the United Kingdom from January 2024 to January 2025, and subsequently during the March–May 2025 United States attacks in Yemen. Israel struck the Houthis multiple times, most recently from May to October 2025.

These statements in support for Iran prompted United Nations Special Envoy for Yemen Hans Grundberg to respond, urging the Houthis to refrain from escalatory actions and stating that "no party has the right to drag the country into a broader conflict that would bring more suffering to the Yemeni people."

The Houthis continued to make more statements supporting Iran but avoided resuming hostilities, not wanting to open multiple fronts in the current Yemeni civil war, which has been waging since 2014 and to focus on ending the conflict with Saudi Arabia. The Times reported on 16 March that the Houthis are awaiting an Iranian signal to resume attacks if US military actions weaken Iran’s control of the Strait of Hormuz. Despite disruptions, the Bab el-Mandeb remains the only viable oil route, with around 30 tankers near the Saudi port city of Yanbu currently within Houthi strike range.

Senior Houthi politburo member Mohammed al-Bukhaiti said that the group was considering a naval blockade and would specifically target vessels belonging to "aggressor countries" involved in military actions against Iran, Iraq, Lebanon, and Palestine, describing it as a strategic measure to support Iran's ongoing confrontation with the US and Israel.

The Houthi movement later warned that it would respond to any escalation against Iran, including efforts to reopen the Strait of Hormuz. It specifically warned the two Arab countries offering to join the Strait of Hormuz campaign—Bahrain and the United Arab Emirates—that they "will be the first to lose in this battle." The Houthis further threatened to join the war in the event that US allies joined the attack on Iran or if the US and Israel used the Red Sea to carry out operations. The Houthis were reportedly pressured by Iran and Hezbollah—fighting the 2026 Lebanon war—to join the conflict in support of them.

== Houthi attacks on Israel ==
The Houthis launched a ballistic missile at Beersheba in Israel on 28 March which was intercepted by Israeli air defenses, marking the resumption of the group's attacks. The Houthis claimed that they targeted sensitive Israeli military sites and was cooperating with Hezbollah and Iran, adding that the attacks would continue until the conflict against all Axis of Resistance fronts stopped. The group later targeted Eilat with a cruise missile and a UAV, all of which were shot down.

The Houthis did not rule out the closure of the Bab el-Mandeb—which connects the Red Sea and the Gulf of Aden—warning that such option is "likely." They threatened to do so should "the aggression against Iran and Lebanon escalate savagely" or if the Gulf Arab states directly joined the war against Iran.

On 30 March, two UAVs launched from Yemen were intercepted by Israeli air defenses overnight.

On 1 April, a third missile attack was carried out by the Houthis on Israel as the IDF stated that it intercepted a missile launched from Yemen, with the group claiming that it had targeted sensitive Israeli military sites with a barrage of ballistic missiles in coordination with Hezbollah and Iran.

On 2 April, another missile launched by the Houthis at Israel was intercepted. The group claimed to have attacked vital Israeli targets in the Tel Aviv area with a barrage of ballistic missiles and stated that its future actions would depend on whether US and Israel's escalated or de-escalated the conflict against Iran.

On 4 April, the IDF stated that a missile launched from Yemen fell in an open area, causing no injuries or damages. The Houthis claimed to have targeted Ben Gurion Airport and "vital" military sites in southern Israel using a cluster missile and several drones, adding that it was a coordinated effort with the Islamic Republic of Iran Army, the Islamic Revolutionary Guard Corps and Hezbollah.

On 6 April, the IDF stated that several UAVs launched from Yemen and aimed at Eilat were intercepted, with contact being lost with some other UAVs. The Houthis claimed they targeted several vital and military sites in Eilat using a barrage of cruise missiles and UAVs in a joint operation coordinated with Iran and Hezbollah.

After the 2026 Iran war ceasefire was declared, Houthi leader Abdul-Malik al-Houthi declared it as a "great victory" for Iran and the Axis of Resistance, while warning that more operations may follow and will be tied to developments in future.

On 8 June, after an exchange of missile attacks between Israel and Iran following Israeli airstrikes on Beirut's southern suburbs, the Houthis launched two missiles at Israel according to the IDF, with one being intercepted and another falling short. The Houthis claimed that it had targeted "sensitive" Israeli sites in the Tel Aviv area and announced a "complete and total ban" on Israeli maritime navigation in the Red Sea. The Houthis also declared that Israeli shipping would be targeted and warned that their operations would intensify in response to further escalation. Israeli air defences intercepted a UAV launched by the Houthis in the Eilat area on 9 June.

== Houthi–Saudi conflict ==
On 13 July 2026, Saudi Arabia reportedly conducted an airstrike on Houthi-held Sanaa International Airport to prevent an Iranian plane from landing. The Iranian plane diverted and landed in Hodeidah. Although the Yemeni internationally-recognized government has claimed responsibility, the Houthis blamed Saudi Arabia for the strike. In response, the Houthis launched missiles at Abha International Airport in southwestern Saudi Arabia.

On 20 July 2026, the Houthis announced a naval blockade on Saudi Arabia, declaring a "naval navigation blockade on the criminal Saudi enemy according to the equation of siege for siege." On 22 July, the Houthis attacked two Saudi oil tankers in the Red Sea using missiles and drones, accusing them of violating the Houthi-imposed blockade. On 24 July, Saudi Arabia retaliated by conducting airstrikes on the Houthi-held port city of Hodeidah and Kamaran Island, resulting in one injury. According to Yemeni sources, Saudi Arabia is reportedly planning for a major naval and ground offensive against the Houthis in central Yemen.

In September 2026, the Houthis have intensified their efforts in the Iran conflict, advancing quickly along Yemen’s Red Sea coast. They captured a key port city and several islands, gaining control of the Bab al-Mandab strait, crucial for global trade and energy shipments.

On 11 September 2026, Houthis captured the island of Perim. Saudi Crown Prince Mohammed bin Salman reportedly urged President Trump to take military action against the Houthis, but Trump declined. He later said the Houthis had signaled that they did not want a conflict with the United States.

On 20 September, the President of the Supreme Political Council Mahdi al-Mashat claims Saudi Arabia "will pay" for Yemen's blockade.

== Reactions ==
=== Houthis ===
Houthi deputy information minister Mohammed Mansour said the Houthis had joined the war "to provide support to our brothers in Iran who are fighting epic battles," adding that "We are in joint coordination with our brothers in Iran, Lebanon, and Iraq." Mansour further stated that the Houthi movement "bears a moral, religious, and humanitarian responsibility toward Iran, Hezbollah, and Iraq's Popular Mobilization Forces."

=== International ===
- France: French foreign ministry spokesman Pascal Confavreux condemned the Houthis as "irresponsible" and called on them to "abstain from all attacks" in order to "avoid an even greater escalation of the conflict."
- Israel: Israel Defense Forces military spokesman Effie Defrin warned that "we are preparing for a multifront war" in response.
- Yemen: Following the Houthi entry into the war, the internationally recognized Yemeni government condemned Iran's "frequent attempts to drag Yemen" into conflict "through its terrorist militias," adding that "the involvement of the Houthi militias in defending the Iranian regime" shows that Iran is "pushing its agents to open other fronts" to reduce political pressure on itself.

== See also ==
- Timeline of the Red Sea crisis
