= Multinational Maritime Defense Alliance =

International military alliance

Multinational Maritime Defense Coalition
- Formation: 30 July 2026; 2 months ago
- Type: Military alliance
- Headquarters: Riyadh, Saudi Arabia
- Region served: Middle East
- Members: Bahrain; Bangladesh; Comoros; Djibouti; Egypt; Jordan; Kuwait; Maldives; Pakistan; Qatar; Saudi Arabia; Somalia; Sudan; Turkey; Yemen (PLC)

The Multinational Maritime Defense Coalition (MMDC) is a 14-country military alliance that was formed during the 2026 Iran war to ensure that globally vital waterways surrounding the Arabian Peninsula—the Gulf of Aden, the Strait of Mandeb, and the Red Sea—remain open to international traffic amidst threats from Houthi-controlled Yemen and other potential actors. It comprises Bahrain, Bangladesh, the Comoros, Djibouti, Egypt, Jordan, Kuwait, Maldives, Pakistan, Qatar, Saudi Arabia, Somalia, Sudan, Turkey and Republic of Yemen (internationally-recognized; led by the Presidential Leadership Council (PLC)).

== Signing ==
The founding states of the Multinational Maritime Defense Alliance issued a joint declaration on 30 July 2026 following their meeting in Riyadh, Saudi Arabia, the text of which reads as follows:

The founding states of the Multinational Maritime Defense Alliance that met in Riyadh on July 30, 2026, reaffirm their firm commitment to the principles of the United Nations Charter, international law, and recognized global maritime customs.

Recognizing the growing challenges to global maritime security and the necessity of strengthening collective defense cooperation to protect freedom of navigation, secure international trade routes, and safeguard energy supply lines across the Bab al-Mandab Strait, the Red Sea, and the Gulf of Aden, the member states affirm that maritime security is a shared responsibility and that cross-border coordination remains the cornerstone for confronting common threats and enhancing global stability. The founding states have agreed to and adopted the following: Establishing the alliance as a defensive framework, prioritizing enhancing maritime security, protecting freedom of navigation, securing international trade routes and energy supply lines, and safeguarding shared maritime interests in the Bab al-Mandab Strait, the Red Sea, and the Gulf of Aden, in accordance with international law, United Nations conventions, and international custom. The states participating in this declaration will proceed to finalize the internal procedures required for formal accession to the Charter of the Multinational Maritime Defense Alliance, in accordance with their respective constitutional and legal frameworks. Strengthening cooperation in maritime security, information and intelligence sharing, operational planning, joint exercises, lessons learned, training, capacity building, and the execution of joint maritime operations in accordance with the Charter's provisions. Affirming that participation in operational activities remains a sovereign decision for each member state in accordance with its national laws. The alliance is purely defensive in nature, does not target any state, alliance, or international organization, and conducts all its activities in full compliance with international law, with respect for state sovereignty, and in defense of the freedom of navigation. States sharing the alliance's objectives and principles are invited to accede to its Charter in accordance with its provisions, thereby helping to expand cooperation and strengthen collective maritime security in the Bab al-Mandab Strait, the Red Sea, and the Gulf of Aden. The designation of the Kingdom of Saudi Arabia as a founding and leading state of the alliance, as well as its permanent headquarters. The establishment of the Joint Command, the Command and Control Center, the Combined Maritime Operations Center, and the General Secretariat in the Kingdom of Saudi Arabia as the alliance's primary executive bodies. The founding states affirm that establishing this multinational maritime defense alliance represents a strategic step toward enhancing maritime security in the Bab al-Mandab Strait, the Red Sea, and the Gulf of Aden; consolidating defense cooperation among member states; and supporting regional stability and prosperity. This will ultimately integrate with and contribute to broader international efforts to protect global peace and security in accordance with the provisions of international law.

Issued in Riyadh, Kingdom of Saudi Arabia, on July 30, 2026.

— Founding States Issue Joint Declaration on Establishing Multinational Maritime Defense Alliance

== History ==
=== Yemeni civil war ===
Since 2014, the Saudi-led intervention in the Yemeni civil war has been aimed at restoring the country's territorial integrity under the internationally recognized Presidential Leadership Council (PLC), which was ousted from Sanaa during the Houthi takeover of Yemen. However, Iranian support for the Houthis has contributed significantly the movement's ability to remain in power at the cost of making Yemen a key front in the decades-long Iran–Saudi Arabia proxy war.

=== Red Sea crisis and formation of the alliance ===
The joint statement declaring the alliance's founding in Riyadh, Saudi Arabia, came in the context of freedom of navigation being further threatened by the Houthi movement in the context of the Red Sea crisis, which has coincided with the Gaza war. In an escalation of the Houthi–Saudi conflict on 14 July, the Houthis had launched missiles at and declared a blockade of Saudi Arabia in response to a PLC airstrike on Sanaa International Airport that was aimed at preventing an Iranian aircraft carrying Houthi officials from landing, forcing it to divert to Hodeidah International Airport, which also lies in Houthi-controlled territory.

== See also ==
- Houthi attacks on commercial vessels
- Axis of Resistance
