= Red Sea crisis order of battle =

The following units are participating in the ongoing Red Sea crisis.

== Houthis and allies ==
- (Yemen) Supreme Political Council
  - Yemeni Armed Forces (SPC)
    - Yemeni Land Forces (SPC)
    - Yemeni Navy (SPC)
      - Type 037 corvette
      - 37.5 m patrol vessels
    - Yemeni Air Force (SPC)
      - Mil Mi-24 helicopters
      - Mil Mi-17 helicopters
  - Houthi militia
- Iran
  - Artesh
    - NEDAJA
      - IRIS Alborz (Frigate)
  - IRGC
    - NEDSA
      - MV Behshad (Intel ship)
    - Quds Force
- Hezbollah
- Islamic Resistance in Iraq
  - Popular Mobilization Forces

== Anti-Houthi forces ==
=== Yemen ===
- (Yemen) Presidential Leadership Council
  - Yemeni Armed Forces (PLC)
    - Yemeni Navy (PLC)
  - Southern Transitional Council

=== Israel ===
- Israel
  - Israeli Navy
    - Shayetet 3
      - INS Magen (Corvette)
      - INS Hanit (Corvette)
      - INS Nitzachon (Corvette)
    - C-Dome
  - Israeli Ground Forces
    - Air Defence Command
      - Arrow 3
  - Israeli Air Force
    - Air Wing 1
      - Defenders of West Squadron
        - Eurocopter AS565 Panthers
    - Air Wing 28
      - Desert Giants Squadron
        - Boeing 707 "Re'em"s
      - Naschon Squadron
    - F-35 Adir fighter jets
    - F-15 Eagles

=== Prosperity Guardian ===
- United States
  - CENTCOM
  - United States Navy
    - NAVCENT
      - Fifth Fleet
        - Carrier Strike Group 2
          - USS Dwight D. Eisenhower (Aircraft carrier)
          - USS Philippine Sea (Cruiser)
          - USS Carney (Destroyer)
          - USS Laboon (Destroyer)
          - USS Mason (Destroyer)
          - USS Thomas Hudner (Destroyer)
          - USS Arleigh Burke (Destroyer)
          - USS Bataan (Amphibious assault ships)
          - USS Florida (Submarine)
    - United States Pacific Fleet
      - Third Fleet
        - Carrier Strike Group 3
          - USS Abraham Lincoln (Aircraft Carrier)
          - USS Frank E. Petersen Jr. (Destroyer)
          - USS Stockdale (Destroyer)
          - USS Spruance (Destroyer)
          - USS O'Kane (Destroyer)
          - USS Michael Murphy (Destroyer)
        - Carrier Strike Group 9
          - USS Theodore Roosevelt (Aircraft Carrier)
          - USS Daniel Inouye (Destroyer)
          - USS Russell (Destroyer)
          - USS Halsey (Destroyer)
      - USFFC
        - Carrier Strike Group 8
          - USS Harry S. Truman (Aircraft Carrier)
          - USS Stout (Destroyer)
          - USS Jason Dunham (Destroyer)
          - USS Gravely (Destroyer)
          - USS Cole (Destroyer)
          - USS Gettysburg (Destroyer)
          - USS Georgia (Submarine)
    - United States Naval Air Forces
      - Carrier Air Wing One
        - Strike Fighter Squadron 11
          - F/A-18F Super Hornet
        - Strike Fighter Squadron 136
          - F/A-18E Super Hornet
        - Strike Fighter Squadron 143
          - F/A-18E Super Hornet
        - Strike Fighter Squadron 81
          - F/A-18E Super Hornet
        - Carrier Airborne Early Warning Squadron 126
          - E-2D Hawkeye
        - Electronic Attack Squadron 144
          - EA-18G Growler
        - Fleet Logistics Support Squadron 40
          - C-2A Greyhound
        - Helicopter Sea Combat Squadron 11
          - MH-60S Seahawk
        - Helicopter Maritime Strike Squadron 72
          - MH-60R Seahawk
      - Carrier Air Wing Three
        - Strike Fighter Squadron 32
          - F/A-18 Super Hornets
        - Strike Fighter Squadron 83
          - F/A-18 Super Hornets
        - Strike Fighter Squadron 105
          - F/A-18 Super Hornets
        - Strike Fighter Squadron 131
          - F/A-18 Super Hornets
        - Electronic Attack Squadron 130
          - EA-18G Growler
        - Carrier Airborne Early Warning Squadron 123
          - E-2C Hawkeye
        - Helicopter Sea Combat Squadron 7
          - MH-60S Seahawk
        - Helicopter Maritime Strike Squadron 74
          - MH-60R Seahawk
      - Carrier Air Wing Nine
        - Strike Fighter Squadron 14
          - F/A-18E Super Hornet
        - Strike Fighter Squadron 41
          - F/A-18F Super Hornet
        - Marine Fighter Attack Squadron 314
          - F-35C Lightning II
        - Strike Fighter Squadron 151
          - F/A-18E Super Hornet
        - Electronic Attack Squadron 133
          - EA-18G Growler
        - Carrier Airborne Early Warning Squadron 117
          - E-2 Hawkeye
        - Helicopter Sea Combat Squadron 14
          - MH-60S Seahawk
        - Helicopter Maritime Strike Squadron 71
          - MH-60R Seahawk
    - United States Naval Special Warfare Command
      - United States Navy SEALs
  - United States Air Force
    - One KC-135 Stratotanker
    - MQ-9 Reapers
  - United States Marine Corps
    - II Marine Expeditionary Force
      - 26th Marine Expeditionary Unit
      - 2nd Marine Aircraft Wing
        - Marine Aircraft Group 14
          - McDonnell Douglas Harriers
  - United States Coast Guard
- United Kingdom
  - Royal Navy
    - Surface Fleet
      - HMS Diamond (Destroyer)
      - HMS Duncan (Destroyer)
      - HMS Richmond (Frigate)
      - HMS Lancaster (Frigate)
  - Royal Air Force
    - Air Command
      - No. 83 Expeditionary Air Group
        - No. 903 Expeditionary Air Wing
          - No. 9 Squadron
          - No. 10 Squadron
          - No. 31 Squadron
          - No. 51 Squadron
- Sri Lanka
  - Sri Lanka Navy
    - SLNS Gajabahu (Armed patrol vessel)
- Canada
  - Royal Canadian Navy (personnel only)
- Australia
  - Royal Australian Navy (personnel only)
- New Zealand
  - Royal New Zealand Navy (personnel only)
- Singapore
  - Republic of Singapore Navy (personnel only)
- Bahrain
  - Royal Bahraini Naval Force (personnel only)
- Seychelles
  - Seychelles Coast Guard (intelligence support)

=== Aspides ===
- France
  - French Navy
    - Languedoc (Frigate)
    - Alsace (Frigate)
    - Forbin (Frigate)
    - Chevalier Paul (Frigate)
    - French Naval Aviation
      - Eurocopter AS565 Panther helicopters
  - French Air and Space Force
    - Base aérienne 188 Djibouti "Colonel Emile Massart"
      - 311 Corsican Squadron
        - Dassault Mirage 2000
- Italy
  - Italian Navy
    - Andrea Doria (Destroyer)
    - Caio Duilio (Destroyer)
    - Virginio Fasan (Frigate)
    - Federico Martinengo (Frigate)
- Germany
  - German Navy
    - Einsatzflottille 2
      - Hessen (Frigate)
    - Marineflieger
      - One Westland Lynx
- Belgium
  - Belgian Navy
    - Louise-Marie (Frigate)
  - Belgian Air Component
    - 40th Squadron
      - One NH90
- Estonia
  - Estonian Navy (personnel only)
- Latvia
  - Latvian Naval Forces (personnel only)

=== Joint Operations (Prosperity Guardian + Aspides) ===
- Greece
  - Hellenic Navy
    - Hydra (Frigate)
    - Psara (Frigate)
- Denmark
  - Royal Danish Navy
    - HDMS Iver Huitfeldt (Frigate)
- Netherlands
  - Royal Netherlands Navy
    - HNLMS Tromp (Frigate)
    - HNLMS Karel Doorman (Joint support ship)
    - Netherlands Naval Aviation Service
      - One NH90
      - One Eurocopter AS532 Cougar
- Sweden
  - Swedish Navy (personnel only)
- Finland
  - Finnish Navy (personnel only)

== Independent deployments ==
- India
  - Indian Navy
    - INS Kolkata (Destroyer)
    - INS Kochi (Destroyer)
    - INS Chennai (Destroyer)
    - INS Visakhapatnam (Destroyer)
    - INS Mormugao (Destroyer)
    - INS Tarkash (Frigate)
    - INS Talwar (Frigate)
    - Indian Naval Air Arm
      - HAL Dhruv helicopters
- Pakistan
  - Pakistan Navy
    - PNS Tughril (Frigate)
    - PNS Taimur (Frigate)
    - PNS Shamsheer (Frigate)
    - PNS Aslat (Frigate)
    - PNS Yarmouk (Corvette)
    - PNS Moawin (Replenishment oiler)
    - PNS Madadgar (Coastal tanker)
    - Pakistan Naval Air Arm
      - WS-61 Sea King helicopters
  - Pakistan Maritime Security Agency
    - 26th Offshore Patrol Squadron
      - PMSS Zhob (Maritime Patrol Vessel)
- China
  - People's Liberation Army Navy
    - Jiaozuo (Destroyer)
    - Xuchang (Frigate)
    - Honghu (Replenishment oiler)
    - (China) People's Liberation Army Naval Air Force
      - Two Harbin Z-9 helicopters
- Saudi Arabia
  - Royal Saudi Air Defense Forces
    - 290th Patriot unit
- Egypt
  - Egyptian Air Force
  - Egyptian Air Defense Forces
