= MV Behshad =

Iran-flagged general cargo ship (1999)

History

Iran
- Name: Mensar (2024); Behshad (2012); Blanca (2012); Magnolia (2011); Sea Flower (2008); Limnetic (2008); Iran Seestan (1999)
- Owner: Rahbaran Omid Darya Ship Management Co.
- Builder: Guangzhou Shipyard International
- Completed: 1999
- Home port: Qeshm Island, Iran
- Identification: IMO number: 9167289; MMSI number: 422036200; Call sign: EPBW3

General characteristics
- Class & type: General cargo
- Tonnage: 16,694 GT
- Length: 174 m (570 ft 10 in)
- Beam: 26 m (85 ft 4 in)
- Height: 13.9 m (45 ft 7 in)

MV Mensar (formerly MV Behshad) is an Iran-flagged general cargo ship built in 1999 and owned by the Iranian company Rahbaran Omid Darya Ship Management Company. She is suspected of serving as a command post and spy ship for the Islamic Revolutionary Guard Corps, and a front for the Islamic Republic of Iran Shipping Lines. For these reasons, she has been sanctioned by the United States Treasury. During the Red Sea crisis, she has been suspected of acting as a reconnaissance vessel for the Houthis in their attacks against shipping in the Red Sea and surrounding waters.

== Characteristics ==
Mensar is a general cargo vessel which sails under the flag of Iran, with her home port being Qeshm. She has a length overall of 174 metres (570 ft 10 in), a width of 26 metres (85 ft 4 in), and a height of 13.9 metres (45 ft 7 in). Her gross tonnage (GT) is 16,694 and her deadweight tonnage (DWT) is 23,176 tons. She has previously sailed under the names of Behshad and Blanca in 2012, Magnolia in 2011, Sea Flower and Limnetic in 2008, and Iran Seestan in 1999. She was renamed Mensar in July 2024. She uses a diesel engine that supplies 9,480 kilowatts (12,710 hp) of power.

== History ==
=== Construction and management ===
Mensar was built in 1999 by Guangzhou Shipyard International. Currently, she is registered as a merchant vessel under the Rahbaran Omid Darya Ship Management Company.

=== Usage by Iran ===
In 2018, Behshad and MV Saviz, another Iranian spy ship registered as a cargo vessel, were sanctioned by the United States under the Donald Trump administration following the withdrawal from the Iran nuclear deal.

In 2021, she garnered media attention after she replaced Saviz in the Red Sea. Saviz had been patrolling the Bab-el-Mandeb strait since 2016, but was damaged by a suspected Israeli limpet mine attack in April 2021. She was towed away by two tugboats just days before Behshad arrived. In early July, Behshad left the port of Bandar Abbas. Nine days later, she arrived at the Bab-el-Mandeb, according to satellite images obtained by CNN. She has operated in the lower Red Sea, close to the strait, until early January 2024.

=== Red Sea crisis ===
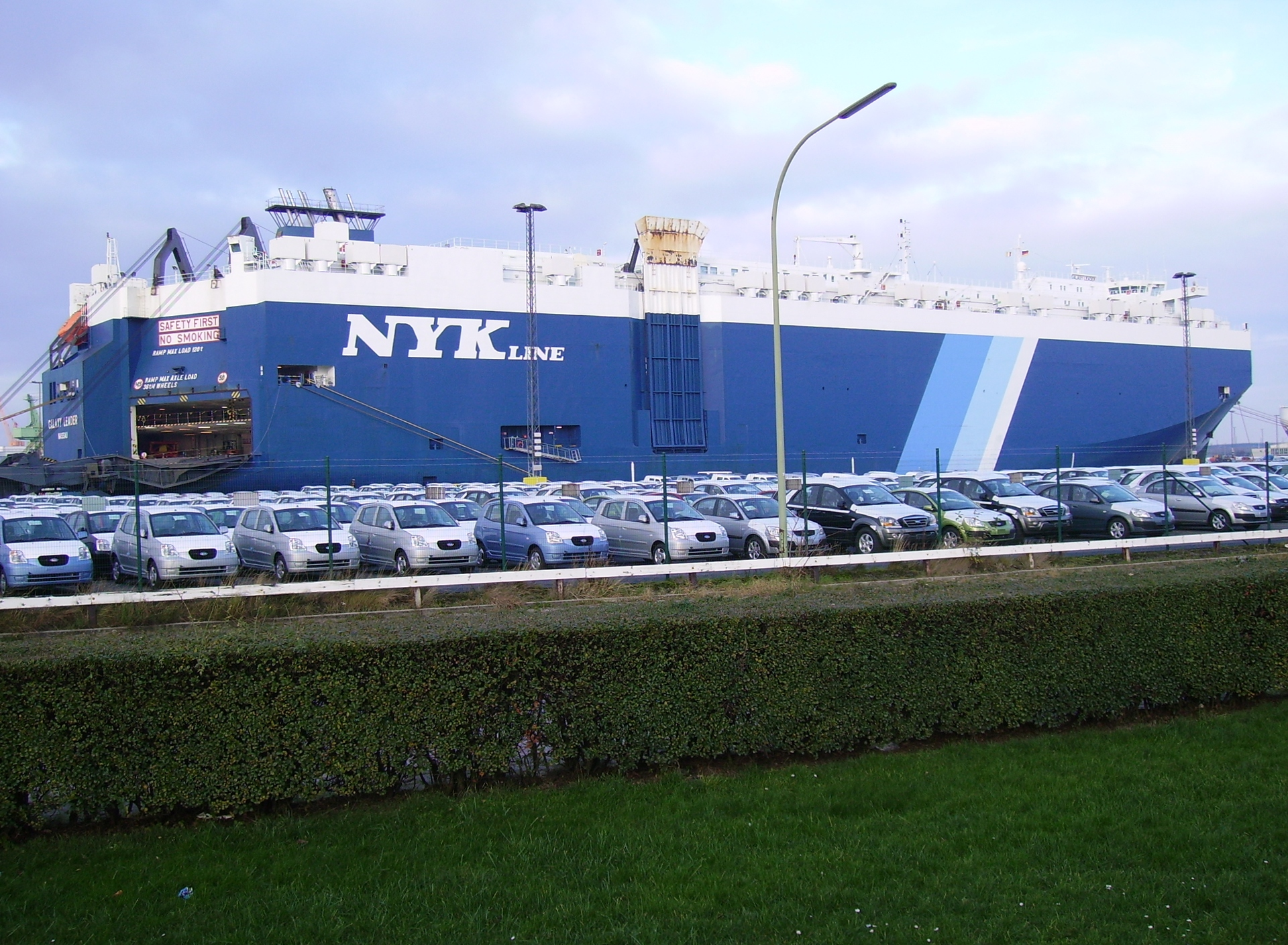
Galaxy Leader at Bremerhaven, 2006. MV Behshad is suspected of passing her location to the Houthis during her hijacking in November 2023

On 19 November 2023, Houthi rebels boarded and hijacked the Israeli-owned Galaxy Leader cargo ship in an operation allegedly led by Quds Force commander Abdolreza Shahlaei. Behshad allegedly played a role in locating the vessel and disclosing it to the Houthis, as her automatic identification system (AIS) was turned off after passing Jeddah, Saudi Arabia. She is also suspected of coordinating the missile strike on the Marlin Luanda, a Marshall Islands-flagged vessel owned by the British company Oceonix, and there have been speculations that she was involved in the fatal attack on the MV True Confidence that killed three of its crewmembers, since she was only 43 nautical miles (80 km; 49 mi) away from the site the vessel was struck.

On 22 December 2023, the Wall Street Journal published a report that Behshad had been responsible for directing Houthi attacks on commercial vessels. The report said that she provides the Houthis with real-time intelligence, allowing them to locate and attack vessels which have made attempts to avoid detection.

In early January 2024, Behshad relocated from the Red Sea to the Gulf of Aden. This occurred around the same time the Houthis began to shift their attacks towards the same region. In early February, she once again relocated, this time docking at a port in Djibouti, around 3 nautical miles (5.6 km; 3.5 mi) from the Chinese naval base. Around this time, the frequency of Houthi attacks began to decrease significantly.

=== Cyberattack ===
On 28 January 2024, Iran-backed militants carried out a drone attack on Tower 22, a US outpost in Jordan, killing three service members. As part of the United States' response to the attack, it conducted a cyberattack against Behshad. It came despite Iranian warnings not to target the ship. The attack was carried out in an attempt to hinder Iran's ability to contact and provide intelligence to the Houthis, according to US officials. Following the attack, she temporarily left the area she normally patrolled, but later returned.

=== Withdrawal ===
On 18 April 2024, after nearly three years at sea, Behshad began to voyage back to Bandar Abbas. According to AIS data provided by the marine tracking website MarineTraffic, she crossed into the Persian Gulf in the early morning and began to move towards the port of Bandar Abbas. Analysts said that the ship was a high-profile target for Israeli strikes, and her withdrawal came as Israel weighed how it would respond to Iranian attacks on its soil.

== Analysis ==
=== Usage ===
Despite Iran denying the ship's usage for military purposes and insisting that it is used to combat piracy off the coast of Somalia, analysts have concluded that Behshad has connections to the IRGC and its proxy groups.

Michael Knights, a journalist for the think tank Washington Institute for Near East Policy who focuses on Iran and its proxies, has concluded that Behshad and Saviz disguise themselves as anti-piracy garrisons that can be visited by Iranian and Syrian shipping, but are actually used for the shipment of Iranian weaponry, and that military trainers for Hezbollah could also use them. He added that the vessels are equipped with electronic intelligence that is passed to the Houthis in order to assist them in locating vessels.

Jon Gahagan, the president of the maritime risk-based website Sedna Global, said that it is unusual for a cargo vessel to move in the way of Beshad while being registered and flagged in Iran. He asked about the vessel, "If she isn't providing the Houthi regime with intelligence on vessel movements, then just what is she doing?"

=== Movement and location ===
Behshad's AIS tracker has shown her move in erratic courses in the Gulf of Aden, in what have been described as "patrol boxes". According to MariTrace, the vessel had been on standby 100 kilometres (62 mi) east of the port of Djibouti from 11 January to 3 February 2024, when she anchored close to the Chinese military base there. Military analysts suspect that the vessel was placed there to discourage US forces from attacking or boarding her.

According to an analysis by NBC News and other experts, the vessel has been present at a distance of several miles away during Houthi attacks on commercial vessels.
