= Al-Nahdayn Mountain =

Mountain in Sanaa, Yemen

Al- Nahdayn Mountain
- Location within Yemen

Highest point
- Elevation: 2,360 m (7,740 ft)
- Listing: List of Yemen's mountains
- Coordinates: 15°17′51″N 44°12′41″E

Geography
- Location: Yemen

Al-Nahdayn Mountain is one of the mountains that overlooks the Yemeni capital Sanaa from the south and directly overlooks the presidential palace from the south as well. The mountain consists of two separate hills and is considered a medium-height mountain, as it rises about 300 meters above the surrounding area.

== Strategic importance ==
The mountain and the presidential palace have been a frequent target of the Arab coalition forces throughout the years of the war that has been ongoing since 2015, after the Houthis took control of the capital Sanaa in September 2014, and it was bombed multiple times. The mountain was one of the strategic locations overlooking Sanaa during the seventy-day siege in 1967, the competition to occupy and control it was fierce between the royal forces on one hand and the republican forces defending Sanaa on the other, this is due to its closeness to the capital Sanaa and the ability of the artillery stationed there to easily select and hit its targets inside the capital. Today, the mountain is in the center of the capital and within the Al-Sabeen district, surrounded by houses and population clusters from all sides due to the great urban expansion that the capital witnessed after the September 26 Revolution in 1962. The royal forces took control of the mountain more than once at the beginning of the Battle of Al-Sabeen and launched strikes toward multiple targets inside the capital, however, Republican forces drove the royal forces from the mountain more than once, and a group of Central Security Forces was stationed on the mountain led by Major Abdulkarim Hamid, and Captain Abdulmalik al-Sayani, commander of the Al-Nahdayn site. They were able to hold it throughout the siege and repel the royal forces attacks coming from the south and southwest of the capital, thus protecting the capital from penetration from the southern side until the siege ended with the defeat of the royal forces and they were pushed away from the periphery of Sanaa and other areas and the victory of the republican side in February 1968. The seven-year civil war in northern Yemen came to a halt after the revolution and the declaration of the republic.

At the beginning of his reign, former president Ali Abdullah Saleh built the presidential palace, called the Presidency House, directly below the mountain, to protect the palace and the surrounding area, also a Republican Guard camp and weapons depots were stationed on the mountain. Inside the Presidency House is the Presidency House Mosque, which is also called the Al-Nahdayn Mosque after the mountain. That mosque was bombed in June 2011 during the protests against Ali Abdullah Saleh, known as the Youth Revolution (a part of the Arab Spring Revolutions). Also, there was an attempt to assassinate the president while he was attending Friday prayers at the mosque and it was known as "Al-Nahdayn Incident". The president and a large group of high-ranking officials were injured in the incident, while several attendees at the mosque were killed.
