= Presidential Palace of Yemen =

- القصر الرئاسي اليمني
- Interactive map of the Presidential Palace of Yemen area

General information
- Location: Sanaa, Yemen
- Coordinates: 15°18′55″N 44°12′49″E

The Presidential Palace, also known as the Republican Palace, was the official residence of the president of Yemen, located in the al-Sabeen neighborhood of southern Sanaa, the capital of Yemen.

The Palace is located near the Saleh Mosque and al-Sabeen Square, where many pro-Ali Abdullah Saleh political rallies and military parades were held when Ali Abdullah Saleh was in power. The palace area was a heavy security zone, guarded by the Presidential Defense Forces (formerly the Republican Guard) and was not open to the public.

On June 3, 2011, during the 2011 Yemeni Revolution, the Presidential Palace was subject to an assassination attack on President Saleh and many government and state officials by opposition tribesmen. It left Saleh injured and seven other top government officials wounded. Saleh, the prime minister, the deputy prime minister, the parliament chief, the governor of Sana'a and a presidential aide were wounded while they were praying at a mosque inside the palace compound. Four presidential guards and Sheikh Ali Mohsen al-Matari, an imam at the mosque, were killed.

On January 20, 2015, the palace was taken over by the Houthis rebel group. President Abd Rabbuh Mansur Hadi was present but was not harmed.

On May 7, 2018, targeted airstrikes by the Saudi-led coalition left the palace "completely flattened" and damaged surrounding buildings. At least six fatalities and thirty injuries are reported.

On August 24, 2025, in retaliation for Houthi-fired rockets toward Israel, the Israeli government launched a series of missiles at Sanaa. Israeli military said the targets of the strikes included a military compound housing the presidential palace, two power plants and a fuel storage site.
