= Houthi blockade of Saudi Arabia =

2026 maritime and aerial embargo against Saudi Arabia

- Part of Red Sea crisis, 2026 Yemen offensives and the 2026 Iran war in the broader Middle Eastern crisis (2023–present)
- Date: 20 July 2026 – present
- Location: Red Sea (Strait of Bab al-Mandab); Saudi airspace and waters
- Type: Naval blockade; Missile and drone strikes; Airspace warnings to commercial airlines
- Cause: Saudi airstrike on Sanaa International Airport (13 July 2026); Long-standing Saudi-led restrictions on Houthi-held ports and airports
- Motive: Secession of restrictions on Houthi-controlled ports and airports
- Target: Saudi Arabia
- Participants: Houthis; Iran (alleged)
- Casualties: 1 Indian-flagged ship sunk

Starting 20 July 2026, the Houthis of Yemen claimed to impose a maritime and aerial embargo against Saudi Arabia. It marked a major escalation between the Iran-aligned Houthis and the Saudi-led coalition, ending a roughly four-year period of relative calm that had held since a 2022 UN-brokered truce in the Yemeni civil war.

== Background ==
Since the rapid Houthi takeover of Yemen in 2014, Yemen has been divided between the Houthi-controlled north and territory held by the internationally recognized, Saudi-backed government of Yemen (PLC). A 2022 UN-brokered truce substantially reduced large-scale fighting, though Saudi Arabia continued restricting access to Houthi-held ports and Sanaa International Airport, a policy the Houthis have long described as a blockade of Houthi.

Regional tensions rose sharply in 2026 amid the wider conflict between the United States, Israel, and Iran. Following the assassination of Iran's Supreme Leader Ali Khamenei on 28 February 2026 at the outset of the US–Israeli war on Iran, a Houthi delegation travelled to Tehran for his funeral aboard an Iranian aircraft. When the aircraft attempted to return the delegation to Sanaa, Saudi Arabia struck the runway at Sanaa International Airport on 13 July 2026 to prevent the landing, acting at the request of the IRG; the aircraft was diverted instead to the Houthi-controlled Red Sea port city of Hodeidah.

In response, the Houthis launched missiles and drones at Abha International Airport in southern Saudi Arabia the same day. Houthi officials said the group considered itself entitled to strike Saudi airports and impose a "siege" on the kingdom, equating this with restrictions Saudi Arabia had long imposed on the Houthis.

== Declaration of the blockade ==
On 20 July 2026, Yahya Saree, Houthi military spokesman, announced in a televised statement that the Houthis were imposing a maritime embargo on Saudi Arabia, describing the move as based on the principle of "an eye for an eye." Officials did not initially specify which vessels would be targeted, though they indicated that ships calling at Saudi ports or carrying Saudi oil could be at risk. The group also warned that any Saudi military response would be met with a "comprehensive and decisive" escalation and called on supporters to mobilize for a wider confrontation.

Houthi leader Abdul-Malik al-Houthi had earlier threatened Saudi oil facilities directly following the Abha airport strike.

== Strategic and economic context ==
The blockade threatened shipping through the Bab-el-Mandeb Strait, linking the Red Sea to the Gulf of Aden, which had become an increasingly important export route for Saudi Arabia. Saudi Arabia had been routing a growing share of its oil exports, reportedly around 70 percent, through Red Sea ports such as Yanbu, partly as an alternative to the Strait of Hormuz, which Iran had closed amid its conflict with the United States. Analysts estimated that a full closure of Bab-el-Mandeb could remove as much as 7 percent of global oil supply from the market, compounding disruptions from reduced flows through Hormuz.

The Houthis had previously conducted an extended campaign against Red Sea shipping beginning in late 2023, during which they reportedly reached informal understandings allowing Russian and Chinese vessels safe passage; the Atlantic Council noted that comparable arrangements might not extend to vessels carrying Saudi oil to Chinese markets.

== Reactions ==
=== Saudi Arabia ===
Saudi Arabia's Foreign Ministry condemned the Houthi announcement, rejected characterizations of its restrictions on Houthi-held territory as a "siege," and stated it would take necessary measures to protect shipping.

=== International ===
The UN Security Council held an emergency session to discuss the escalation, with members expressing concern about the risk of wider regional conflict. Shipping insurers raised premiums for vessels transiting the Red Sea following the announcement.

On 28 July 2026, Reuters reported that China had held direct talks with the Houthis and Iran to enable its tankers to pass through the Red Sea without being attacked. It reported that China was clearing each vessel with the Houthis individually, and both sides have informed Iran of their actions.

== See also ==
- Yemeni civil war (2014–present)
- Red Sea crisis
- Saudi-led intervention in the Yemeni civil war
- Bab-el-Mandeb
- Strait of Hormuz
