= MV Saviz =

Cargo vessel of the Islamic Republic of Iran Shipping Lines

History

Iran
- Name: Saviz
- Namesake: Saviz
- Home port: Khorramshahr, Iran
- Identification: IMO number: 9167253; MMSI number: 422026600

MV Saviz (Persian: ساویز) is an Iranian cargo ship of Islamic Republic of Iran Shipping Lines, commonly known by its business name IRISL Group. The vessel is believed to have been used as a reconnaissance ship and military base of the Government of the Islamic Republic of Iran. It was allegedly attacked on 6 April 2021 by Israel Defence Force (IDF) with several limpet mines at a position at the Red Sea close to the Eritrean coast, near Yemen, where it had been in position for several years.

== Ship ==
The MV Saviz is registered with the International Maritime Organization as a civilian cargo ship and owned by the IRISL Group, which is owned by the Iranian government. The vessel has been in position for several years in the Red Sea, close to the Eritrean coast. It is believed to be a covert base for the paramilitary Revolutionary Guard. However, Tehran claimed it was a "non-military ship", helping to "provide security along shipping lines and combat pirates". According to the US Combating Terrorism Center (USMA), the ship has signals intelligence domes and antennas. It is equipped with at least three speedboats on deck, according to CTC, which are used to ferry personnel to Yemen.

== History ==
The Israeli newspaper Haaretz citing reports in 2021 that the Saviz had served as the command center for operations in Yemen and Africa. The ship's long presence in the region, has repeatedly been criticized by Saudi Arabia. Experts said, the ship carried out support for Yemen's Houthi rebels in the Yemeni Civil War.

The Saviz came to the Red Sea in late 2016, according to ship-tracking data. The ship has drifted off the Dahlak archipelago, a chain of islands off the coast of the nearby Eritrea in the Red Sea. It received supply replenishments and switched crew via passing Iranian vessels using the waterway.

The Saviz was sanctioned in 2018 by the US President Donald Trump administration, and the vessel was placed on the Treasury's Specially Designated Nationals and Blocked Persons List (SDN).

== Mine incident in 2021 ==
Since 25 February 2021, there had been three other reported attacks on Iranian- or Israeli-owned shipping by both sides.

The Iranian Tasnim news agency reported on the evening of 6 April 2021, that the Saviz had run into a mine in the Red Sea and was damaged by the explosion. The explosion occurred near the coast of Djibouti, causing minor damage and no reported fatalities. At this time the Saviz was supposed to escort Iranian merchant ships in the Red Sea. Iran's Foreign Ministry confirmed the attack on the Saviz, saying Tehran will pursue the case through international organizations. Iranian officials suspected the attack have been carried out by Israel, yet did not immediately blame any party. The spokesperson explained that Saviz, a civilian ship, had been stationed in the Red Sea and the Gulf of Aden to ensure maritime security in the shipping routes and counter the pirates, noting that the deployment had been announced beforehand in coordination with the International Maritime Organization (IMO) as the regulating body. The assault came as Iran and world powers were meeting in Vienna for the first talks about the U.S. potentially rejoining the Iranian nuclear deal, which Israel strongly opposes.

On 7 April, The New York Times reported that Israel notified the US that it was responsible for the attack on the Saviz.
