= List of shipwrecks in 2024 =

The list of shipwrecks in 2024 includes ships sunk, foundered, grounded, or otherwise lost during 2024.

table of contents
2024
Jan	Feb	Mar	Apr
May	Jun	Jul	Aug
Sep	Oct	Nov	Dec
Unknown date

== January ==
=== 4 January ===
List of shipwrecks: 4 January 2024
Ship	State	Description
Bugoe	Portugal	The cargo ship veered off course due to ice flows and strong winds resulting in her becoming stranded in shallow waters on the edge of Väinameri Bay, Estonia.
Wilfred	United Kingdom	Storm Henk: The Thames barge sank at Temple, London.

=== 6 January ===
List of shipwrecks: 6 January 2024
Ship	State	Description
Unidentified ship	Unknown	A vessel was blown ashore off Umm Al Quwain, United Arab Emirates, by high winds and strong waves.

=== 10 January ===
List of shipwrecks: 10 January 2024
Ship	State	Description
Jacob Pike	United States	The 83-foot (25 m) out of service sardine carrier sank in a storm at Harpswell, Maine. The vessel was raised in early August for pollution mitigation and will probably be scrapped.

=== 15 January ===
List of shipwrecks: 15 January 2024
Ship	State	Description
Star Sebang	Philippines	The cargo ship suffered cargo shift in heavy seas, rolled on her side and probably sank in the Sulu Sea off the west coast of Mindanao. The crew was rescued by the Philippine Coast Guard.

=== 16 January ===
List of shipwrecks: 16 January 2024
Ship	State	Description
Viet Phu 16	Vietnam	The 75-metre (246 ft), 2,368-ton cargo ship suffered hull damage when it struck bottom in the East China Sea near Cu Lao Cham Island, Quảng Nam, Vietnam. She was run aground in shallow water off Cu Lao Cham Island to prevent sinking.

=== 26 January ===
List of shipwrecks: 26 January 2024
Ship	State	Description
Marlin Luanda	Marshall Islands	Gaza war, Red Sea crisis: The tanker was struck by a Houthi missile and caught fire in the Red Sea 60 nautical miles (110 km) south east of Aden, Yemen.

=== 30 January ===
List of shipwrecks: 30 January 2024
Ship	State	Description
Deep Stim III	United States	The 239-foot (73 m) retired oil and gas research vessel was sunk as an artificial reef in 100 feet (30 m) of water 22 miles (35 km) south of Destin, Florida in the Gulf of Mexico (30°03′N 86°17′W).

=== Unknown date ===
List of shipwrecks: unknown date January 2024
Ship	State	Description
Ran	Sweden	The 7-metre (23 ft) robotic research submersible went missing on 27–28 January under the Thwaites Glacier, Antarctica and was considered lost.

== February ==
=== 1 February ===
List of shipwrecks: 1 February 2024
Ship	State	Description
Ivanovets	Russian Navy	Russian invasion of Ukraine: The Tarantul-class corvette was sunk in Donuzlav, a bay located in the western part of Crimea, by Ukrainian sea drones.

=== 6 February ===
List of shipwrecks: 6 February 2024
Ship	State	Description
Alster	Germany	The 80-metre (260 ft) inland cargo barge sank in the Elbe River at Hamburg, Germany.
Kambur	Faroe Islands	The fishing vessel foundered 17 nautical miles (31 km) south of Suðuroy with the loss of two of her sixteen crew. Survivors were rescued by helicopter.

=== 7 February ===
List of shipwrecks: 7 February 2024
Ship	State	Description
Gulfstream	Flag unknown	The unmanned tank barge capsized with around 35,000 barrels (5,600 m^{3}) of oil and drifted aground off Cove Eco-Industrial Park, on the southern coast of Tobago, causing an oil spill. Gulfstream was reported en route from Panama to Guyana in tow of tug Solo Creed (Tanzania). On 28 February oil began to wash ashore on Bonaire, believed to have originated from the barge Gulfstream.

=== 8 February ===
List of shipwrecks: 8 February 2024
Ship	State	Description
Three landing craft medium	Myanmar	Myanmar civil war: The Arakan Army announced on 13 February the sinking of three junta ships between 7 and 8 February off the coast of Kyautaw, Rakhine State, with the estimated loss of up to 900 lives.

=== 14 February ===
List of shipwrecks: 14 February 2024
Ship	State	Description
Boz Azlina	Malaysia	The offshore supply vessel sank 9 nautical miles (17 km) northwest of Kuala Kemena off Bintulu, Sarawak, Malaysia. The crew was rescued by the patrol vessel Bot Kilat 44 and a water taxi.
Cape Cordell	Canada	The 18-metre (59 ft), 146-ton fishing vessel ran aground just outside Fortune Harbour, Newfoundland and Labrador, Canada, in bad weather. Refloated on 22 February, but further inspection found the vessel's hull was in poor shape. She was then scrapped.
Tsezar Kunikov	Russian Navy	Russian invasion of Ukraine: The Project 775 (NATO reporting name: Ropucha-I-class) large landing ship was sunk off the coast of Crimea by Ukrainian MAGURA V5 sea drones.

=== 15 February ===
List of shipwrecks: 15 February 2024
Ship	State	Description
Batuhan A	Turkey	The 69-metre (226 ft) cargo ship sank in the Sea of Marmara in heavy seas. The crew of six were reported missing.

=== 21 February ===
List of shipwrecks: 21 February 2024
Ship	State	Description
Freedom II CN111	United Kingdom	The 16-metre (52 ft) prawn trawler sprung a leak and was taken under tow, later sank 11 nautical miles (20 km) southwest of Oban, Scotland.

=== 22 February ===
List of shipwrecks: 22 February 2024
Ship	State	Description
Islander	Palau	Gaza war, Red Sea crisis: The cargo ship, en route to Egypt, was set on fire after being hit by an anti-ship missile in the Gulf of Aden, according to the United Kingdom Maritime Trade Operations. No casualties were reported.

== March ==
=== 2 March ===
List of shipwrecks: 2 March 2024
Ship	State	Description
Rubymar	Belize	Rubymar Gaza war, Red Sea crisis: During a voyage from the United Arab Emirates to Belarus with a cargo of 21,000 tonnes (21,000 long tons; 23,000 short tons) of fertilizer, the cargo ship sank in stormy weather in the Red Sea off Yemen in 100 metres (330 ft) of water after slowly taking on water since two missiles fired by Houthis struck her on 18 February, forcing her crew to abandon ship. One of the missiles had struck her stern near her engine room, and she finally sank by the stern due to that damage while under tow to Djibouti.

=== 3 March ===
List of shipwrecks: 3 March 2024
Ship	State	Description
Fukuei Maru No. 8	Japan	The 56-metre (184 ft) tuna boat ran aground, apparently at least partly sunk, on Kozushima Island in the group of Izu Islands south of Tokyo. One crewman died, the rest of the crew were rescued by Japanese Coast Guard helicopters.

=== 5 March ===
List of shipwrecks: 5 March 2024
Ship	State	Description
Sergey Kotov	Russian Navy	Russian invasion of Ukraine: The Project 22160 patrol ship was sunk off the coast of Kerch by Ukrainian MAGURA V5 sea drones.

=== 6 March ===
List of shipwrecks: 6 March 2024
Ship	State	Description
True Confidence	Barbados	Red Sea crisis: The bulk carrier was hit by a Houthi ballistic missile in the Red Sea, killing two crewmen and wounding six others. The remaining crew abandoned the vessel.

=== 10 March ===
List of shipwrecks: 10 March 2024
Ship	State	Description
Hung Phat 89	Vietnam	The cargo ship sank 380 nautical miles (700 km) east of Vũng Tàu, Vietnam. The crew was rescued by Vietnam Coast Guard.

=== 11 March ===
List of shipwrecks: 11 March 2024
Ship	State	Description
Mekhanik Pogodin	Russia	Russian invasion of Ukraine: The tanker, washed ashore on Kinburn Spit since 2023, and being used as an observation station and drone control by Russian Forces, was destroyed by a Ukrainian air strike.

=== 14 March ===
List of shipwrecks: 10 March 2024
Ship	State	Description
Unknown fishing boat	China	A fishing boat sank 1.98 kilometres (1.23 mi) southwest of Dongding Island, Kinmen County, Taiwan, near the Chinese Fujian Province. Two crew were killed and two others reported missing.

=== 17 March ===
List of shipwrecks: 17 March 2024
Ship	State	Description
Lady Zehra	Panama	The cargo ship ran aground at Alexandria, Egypt. Still aground as of 25 March.

=== 18 March ===
List of shipwrecks: 18 March 2024
Ship	State	Description
Lomur	Greenland	The 43-metre (141 ft) trawler sank west of Sisimiut, Greenland in an accident. The crew were rescued.

=== 19 March ===
List of shipwrecks: 19 March 2024
Ship	State	Description
Kapitan Lobanov	Russia	The fishing trawler exploded, caught fire and sank off Pionersky after being hit by a Russian missile during an exercise in the Baltic Sea. Four of her seven crew were rescued, one was killed and two were reported missing.

=== 20 March ===
List of shipwrecks: 20 March 2024
Ship	State	Description
Keoyoung Sun	South Korea	The tanker capsized in rough seas off Mutsure Island, Japan. Eight of the eleven crew died, two were reported missing, and one survivor was rescued by Japanese Coast Guard helicopters.

=== 22 March ===
List of shipwrecks: 22 March 2024
Ship	State	Description
Two unknown vessels	Turkey	Two wooden tourist boats were destroyed by fire at Alanya, Turkey.

=== 24 March ===
List of shipwrecks: 24 March 2024
Ship	State	Description
Azov and Yamal	Russian Navy	Russian invasion of Ukraine: The Project 775 (NATO reporting name: Ropucha-I-class) large landing ships were damaged and claimed to be sunk by Ukrainian Storm Shadow missiles.

=== 26 March ===
List of shipwrecks: 26 March 2024
Ship	State	Description
Dali	Singapore	Dali Francis Scott Key Bridge collapse: The container ship collided with a pier of the Francis Scott Key Bridge, Baltimore, Maryland, United States, causing the complete collapse of the bridge. The weight of bridge debris pressed Dali's bow onto the bottom of the Patapsco River. The vessel was refloated on 20 May 2024.

=== 28 March ===
List of shipwrecks: 28 March 2024
Ship	State	Description
American Mariner	United States	The bulk carrier ran aground in Munuscong Lake, Michigan, United States, blocking ship traffic going to the Soo Locks. The vessel was refloated the next day.

== April ==
=== 3 April ===
List of shipwrecks: 3 April 2024
Ship	State	Description
Yuenan Aoyu 36062	China	The 55-metre (180 ft) fishing vessel was sunk in a collision with SITC Danang (Panama) 22 nautical miles (41 km) southwest of Yinggehai town in Ledong, Hainan, China. The crew of eight were reported missing.

=== 7 April ===
List of shipwrecks: 7 April 2024
Ship	State	Description
Serpukhov	Russian Navy	Russo-Ukrainian War: The Buyan-class corvette was severely damaged by fire at Kaliningrad. Ukraine claimed responsibility for the attack.
Zico	Mozambique	The fishing vessel used as a ferry sank off the north coast of Mozambique. More than 90 of the 130 people on board were reported killed.

=== 10 April ===
List of shipwrecks: 10 April 2024
Ship	State	Description
Two unidentified vessels	Flags unknown	Two migrant boats from Tunisia sank in the Mediterranean Sea near Lampedusa. Nine people died, 22 survivors were rescued by Italian Coast Guard, and 15 were reported missing from one boat, all 45 people were reported missing from the other boat.

=== 12 April ===
List of shipwrecks: 12 April 2024
Ship	State	Description
26 unnamed barges	United States	Twenty-six barges broke loose in the Ohio River near Pittsburgh, Pennsylvania, going down stream sinking an unknown number of small boats at Peggy's Harbor marina. One barge sank near Dashields Locks and Dam.
Unknown vessel	Unknown	A vessel, carrying migrants, capsized and sank off Djibouti. At least 16 children and 27 adults were killed.

=== 19 April ===
List of shipwrecks: 19 April 2024
Ship	State	Description
Unknown ferry	Central African Republic	A ferry capsized and sank in the Mpoko River near the capital, Bangui. At least 58 people were killed.

=== 21 April ===
List of shipwrecks: 21 April 2024
Ship	State	Description
Kommuna	Russian Navy	Russo-Ukrainian War: The submarine rescue ship was attacked by the Ukrainian Navy at Sevastopol and set on fire.

=== 23 April ===
List of shipwrecks: 23 April 2024
Ship	State	Description
Unknown landing ship	People's Liberation Army Navy	A decommissioned Type 074 tank landing ship was torpedoed and sunk in a SINKEX exercise by an unknown Type 039 submarine (People's Liberation Army Navy).
Xin Rong Hai 1	China	The cargo ship sank after a collision with the Jiujiang Bridge on G240 National Highway, Guangdong, China. Seven of the crew were rescued, and four were reported missing.

== May ==
=== 1 May ===
List of shipwrecks: 1 May 2024
Ship	State	Description
Courage	Belgium	The 110-metre (360 ft) inland cargo vessel broke in two and sank in the Waal River near Deest, Netherlands.

=== 12 May ===
List of shipwrecks: 12 May 2024
Ship	State	Description
Alboran Cognac	Spain	Iberian orca attacks: The 50-foot (15 m) yacht was attacked by one or more orcas, breaching her hull. She was abandoned by the two people on board, who were rescued by a tanker. She consequently sank near the Straits of Gibraltar.

=== 18 May ===
List of shipwrecks: 18 May 2024
Ship	State	Description
Mohammed Z	Tanzania	The 3,425-ton cargo vessel sank about 26 nautical miles (48 km) off Sfântu Gheorghe, Romania, in the Black Sea, probably after a collision with Michel (Comoros). Eight crewmembers were rescued by Michel, with three others reported missing.

=== 18 May ===
List of shipwrecks: 18 May 2024
Ship	State	Description
Tsiklon	Russian Navy	Russian invasion of Ukraine: The Karakurt-class corvette was sunk by Ukrainian MGM-140 ATACMS missiles in the port of Sevastopol in Russian-occupied Crimea.

=== 21 May ===
List of shipwrecks: 21 May 2024
Ship	State	Description
De Gallant	Vanuatu	The 36.2-metre (119 ft) sailing cargo vessel capsized and sank in a storm 22 nautical miles (41 km) north of Great Inagua, The Bahamas. Six crewmembers were rescued, with two others reported missing.

=== 24 May ===
List of shipwrecks: 24 May 2024
Ship	State	Description
Lianhe Qirui	China	The 4,463-ton, 85-metre (279 ft) oil field supply tug sank in the East China Sea off Zhoushou, China (30°44′N 122°31′E).

=== 25 May ===
List of shipwrecks: 25 May 2024
Ship	State	Description
Atlantis	Flag unknown	The 80-foot (24 m) superyacht sank 2 miles (3.2 km) off St. Augustine, Florida after striking a dredging pipe piling.
LCM 8558	United States Army	The Mark 8 landing craft mechanized broke loose from a temporary pier in Gaza in heavy seas and washed ashore near Ashkelon, Israel.
Unknown landing craft	United States Army	A Mark 8 landing craft mechanized broke loose from a temporary pier in Gaza in heavy seas and washed ashore apparently in Gaza.
Unknown tugboat	United States Army	A tugboat broke loose from a temporary pier in Gaza in heavy seas and washed ashore in Gaza or Ashkelon, Israel.
20	United States Army	The barge, or piece of the pier itself, broke loose from a temporary pier in Gaza in heavy seas and washed ashore near Ashkelon, Israel.

=== 30 May ===
List of shipwrecks: 30 May 2024
Ship	State	Description
Avangard	Russia	Russian invasion of Ukraine: The ferry was damaged by downed Ukrainian missile debris at Kerch in Crimea and was beached or ran aground.
Mechta	Russia	Russian invasion of Ukraine: The pilot boat was claimed sunk by downed Ukrainian missile debris at the Kerch ferry crossing in Crimea.

== June ==
=== 1 June ===
List of shipwrecks: 1 June 2024
Ship	State	Description
Unknown river ferry	Unknown	A boat carrying twenty-five people capsized and sank in east Kabul, Afghanistan, killing at least twenty people, including five confirmed deaths. Five others were rescued.

=== 5 June ===
List of shipwrecks: 5 June 2024
Ship	State	Description
King Bryan	Philippines	The fishing boat caught fire and exploded off the coast of Naga, Philippines, killing six fishermen. Six others were rescued.

=== 6 June ===
List of shipwrecks: 6
Ship	State	Description
Unknown tugboat	Russian Navy	Russo-Ukrainian War: A Project 498 Saturn-class tugboat was claimed sunk by naval drones in Lake Panske, Crimea.

=== 7 June ===
List of shipwrecks: 7
Ship	State	Description
Unknown	Unknown	A boat carrying over 171 people sank in the Mediterranean Sea off Libya, killing at least 11 people. 160 others were rescued.

=== 10 June ===
List of shipwrecks: 10 June 2024
Ship	State	Description
HB la Saintet	Democratic Republic of the Congo	2024 Kwa River disaster: The boat, carrying 270 people, capsized and sank in the Kwa River near the village of Lidiba in Mai-Ndombe Province, Democratic Republic of Congo. 86 people died and 185 swam to shore.
Unknown boat	Unknown	A boat carrying over 189 migrants capsized and sank off Yemen, killing at least 49 people. 140 others were reported missing.

=== 11 June ===
List of shipwrecks: 11 June 2024
Ship	State	Description
RFNS Puamau	Republic of Fiji Navy	The Guardian-class patrol boat ran aground on a reef of Fulaga Island during its maiden voyage. No one was hurt.

=== 15 June ===
List of shipwrecks: 17 June 2024
Ship	State	Description
Three boats	Canada	Three boats caught fire and sank in Killins Marina in Port Stanley, Ontario, Canada, causing damage to the pier. Nobody was injured or killed.

=== 17 June ===
List of shipwrecks: 17 June 2024
Ship	State	Description
USS Cleveland	United States Navy	The decommissioned Austin-class amphibious transport dock was sunk as a target ship in the North Pacific Ocean's Mariana Island Range Complex, apparently in the first test of the Precision Strike Missile on a moving target.
Tutor	Liberia	The cargo ship sank in the Red Sea north of the Bab al-Mandeb after being damaged by a Houthi drone boat on 12 June. 21 crewmembers were rescued after abandoning ship on 14 June, with one death.

=== 19 June ===
List of shipwrecks: 19 June 2024
Ship	State	Description
Unknown boat	Unknown	A refugee ship/boat caught fire, capsized and at least partly sank in the Mediterranean Sea about 195 kilometres (121 mi) off the Calabrian coast. Eleven of more than 60 people on board were rescued by the Italian Coast Guard.

=== 21 June ===
List of shipwrecks: 21 June 2024
Ship	State	Description
Aratere	New Zealand	The ro-ro passenger, vehicle and rail ferry ran aground due to a steering failure in Titoki Bay about 1.5 nautical miles (2.8 km) to the north of Picton, New Zealand on the South Island. The vessel was refloated about 24 hours later on 22 June.

=== 24 June ===
List of shipwrecks: 24 June 2024
Ship	State	Description
Noah Satu	Indonesia	The bulk carrier burned and sank from an engine room fire in the Java Sea off Tuban, Indonesia. The crew was rescued by the Indonesian Coast Guard patrol ship KN Chundamani (Indonesia Coast Guard) and the tugboat Mitra Anugerah 27 (Indonesia).

=== 25 June ===
List of shipwrecks: 25 June 2024
Ship	State	Description
Baltic Arrow	St. Kitts and Nevis	The 86-metre (282 ft) cargo ship ran aground in the River Nene near Wisbech, Cambridgeshire, blocking the river. The vessel was refloated at high tide.

== July ==
=== 1 July ===
List of shipwrecks: 1 July 2024
Ship	State	Description
Unknown boat	Flag unknown	A fishing boat, carrying refugees/migrants, capsized in heavy seas and strong wind 4 kilometres (2.5 mi) off Ndiago, Mauritania in the Atlantic Ocean. 89 people were killed, 9 survivors were rescued by the Mauritanian coastguard, and 72 people were reported missing.

=== 3 July ===
List of shipwrecks: 3 July 2024
Ship	State	Description
Unnamed power boat	United States	One man was killed and ten others were injured when a 48-foot (15 m) power boat crashed into the Alamitos Bay jetty and sank.
Virgem Dolorosa	Portugal	The fishing vessel sank off the coast of Marinha Grande, Portugal, killing three fishermen. Eleven people were rescued, while three others were reported missing.

=== 4 July ===
List of shipwrecks: 4 July 2024
Ship	State	Description
Julie Anne	United Kingdom	The 15-metre (49 ft) fishing boat sank at her mooring in the Sound of Mull, off the Ardnamurchan coast, Scotland in 20 metres (66 ft) of water. A salvage attempt on 21 July failed. The wreck was raised around the end of August.

=== 7 July ===
List of shipwrecks: 7 July 2024
Ship	State	Description
Sahand	Islamic Republic of Iran Navy	The Moudge-class frigate rolled onto her port side and sank in shallow water partly above water at Bandar Abbas whilst under repair. Reportedly salvaged on 19 July, but reportedly sank again in somewhat deeper water.

=== 8 July ===
List of shipwrecks: 8 July 2024
Ship	State	Description
Kum Jin	Mongolia	The 70-metre (230 ft) cargo ship's hull cracked and she sank from leakage off Tanjung Rhu, Malaysia. The crew was rescued by the Malaysian Maritime Enforcement Agency rescue boat Perkasa 36 (Malaysia).

=== 10 July ===
List of shipwrecks: 10 July 2024
Ship	State	Description
Ultra Galaxy	Panama	The cargo ship ran aground along a remote part of the west coast of South Africa known as Brand se Baai. She broke up in a storm on 28 July.

=== 11 July ===
List of shipwrecks: 14 July 2024
Ship	State	Description
USS Dubuque	United States Navy	The decommissioned Austin-class amphibious transport dock was sunk as a target in a SINKEX exercise in the Pacific Ocean off the northern coast of Kauai, Hawaii in 15,000 feet (4,600 m) of water. She was sunk by a Quicksink bomb dropped from a Northrop B-2 Spirit aircraft.

=== 12 July ===
List of shipwrecks: 12 July 2024
Ship	State	Description
Ultra Galaxie	Panama	The 124-metre (407 ft) bulk carrier ran aground near Doring Bay, off Brand se Baai, South Africa 385 kilometres (239 mi) north of Cape Town, after being abandoned the previous day when she listed. Her crew was rescued by the fishing vessel Malachite (South Africa). Ultra Galaxie broke into four pieces in rough weather over 27–28 July.

=== 14 July ===
List of shipwrecks: 14 July 2024
Ship	State	Description
Volgo-Balt 213	Panama	The 114-metre (374 ft) cargo ship ran aground in Mudanya, Bursa Province, Turkey. The ship was refloated and resumed its voyage.

=== 16 July ===
List of shipwrecks: 16 July 2024
Ship	State	Description
Prestige Falcon	Comoros	The 117-metre (384 ft) oil products tanker capsized 25 nautical miles (46 km) southwest of Ras Madrakah, Oman. Nine of the 16 crew were recovered.

=== 19 July ===
List of shipwrecks: 19 July 2024
Ship	State	Description
Eagles	Turkey	The 20-metre (66 ft) tourist yacht burned and sank off Marmaris, Turkey. There were 110 tourists on board.
Miss Peggy	United States	The 55-foot (17 m) tugboat sank in a collision with Yangze 7 (Liberia) in the Houston Ship Channel (29°45′N 95°04′W). One crewman was killed. The wreck was later raised.
USS Tarawa	United States Navy	The decommissioned Tarawa-class amphibious assault ship was sunk as a target in a SINKEX exercise in the Pacific Ocean off the northern coast of Kauai, Hawaii in 15,000 feet (4,600 m) of water. She was sunk by an AGM-158C LRASM fired from a Boeing F/A-18F Super Hornet aircraft.
Unknown boat	Haiti	A boat, carrying refugees/migrants, burned and sank off Cape Haitian, Haiti. At least 40 people were killed. Forty-one survivors were rescued.

=== 21 July ===
List of shipwrecks: 21 July 2024
Ship	State	Description
INS Brahmaputra	Indian Navy	The Brahmaputra-class frigate caught fire at dock at the Mumbai naval dockyard. After the fire was extinguished, the frigate rolled onto her port side and sank in shallow water partly above water on 22 July. One crewman went missing, his body was recovered on 24 July.

=== 22 July ===
List of shipwrecks: 22 July 2024
Ship	State	Description
Argos Georgia	Saint Helena	The longline fishing vessel sank after a hatch failure in the South Atlantic Ocean 200 miles (320 km) east of Stanley, Falkland Islands. Thirteen of her 27 crew were killed.
Unknown boat	Flag unknown	2024 Nouakchott migrant boat disaster: A pirogue, carrying refugees/migrants, capsized near Nouakchott, Mauritania. Fifteen people were killed and more than 195 were missing of the 300 passengers. The Mauritanian coastguard rescued 120 people.

=== 23 July ===
List of shipwrecks: 23 July 2024
Ship	State	Description
Slavianan	Russia	Russo-Ukrainian War: The ferry was sunk in a Ukrainian strike in the Kerch area in Russian-occupied Crimea.

=== 24 July ===
List of shipwrecks: 24 July 2024
Ship	State	Description
Bonhomie Williams	United Kingdom	The 15-metre (49 ft) sailboat was sunk by orcas in the Strait of Gibraltar 2 miles (3.2 km) off Camarinal Cape, between Tarifa and Barbate, Spain. The owner and two crew on board were rescued by the Spanish coast guard vessel Salvamar Enif.

=== 25 July ===
List of shipwrecks: 25 July 2024
Ship	State	Description
Basia	Mongolia	Typhoon Gaemi: The 95-metre (312 ft) cargo ship was driven ashore by the typhoon on Taiwan.
Dolphin	Cameroon	Typhoon Gaemi: The 74-metre (243 ft) cargo ship was driven ashore by the typhoon on Taiwan.
Fu Shun	Tanzania	Typhoon Gaemi: The 55-metre (180 ft) freighter sank in the Taiwan Strait off Kaohsiung harbor. Six of the crew were reported missing, three were rescued.
Ginan	Cameroon	Typhoon Gaemi: The 72.6-metre (238 ft) freighter was driven ashore by the typhoon 0.5 nautical miles (0.93 km) west of Kaohsiung Cieding, Taiwan.
Hong Sheng 88	Sierra Leone	Typhoon Gaemi: The 91-metre (299 ft) cargo ship was driven ashore by the typhoon on Taiwan.
Iriana	Indonesia	Typhoon Gaemi: The 117-metre (384 ft) cement carrier was driven ashore by the typhoon northwest of Fangshan, Pingtung, Taiwan.
JSW Raigad	India	The 121-metre (397 ft) cargo ship ran aground off Kolaba Fort in Raigad district, India in severe weather. The crew was rescued by the Indian Coast Guard.
Keta	Mongolia	Typhoon Gaemi: The 98-metre (322 ft) cargo ship was driven ashore by the typhoon on Taiwan.
Sophia	Antigua and Barbuda	Typhoon Gaemi: The 95-metre (312 ft) cargo ship was driven ashore by the typhoon on Taiwan.
Terra Nova	Philippines	Typhoon Gaemi: The tanker capsized and sank 3.6 nautical miles (6.7 km) east of Lamao Point off Limay, Bataan, in Manila Bay, the Philippines. Sixteen crew were rescued, one died.
Xin Li	Tanzania	Typhoon Gaemi: The 84-metre (276 ft) freighter was driven ashore by the typhoon in Dapeng Bay 0.1 nautical miles (0.19 km) southwest of Dapeng Bay Qingzhou Park, Taiwan. Refloated later.

=== 27 July ===
List of shipwrecks: 27 July 2024
Ship	State	Description
MTKR Jason Bradley	Philippines	The tanker sank off Barangay Cabcaben, Bataan, in Manila Bay, the Philippines in 9 metres (30 ft) of water.

=== 30 July ===
List of shipwrecks: 30 July 2024
Ship	State	Description
Private boat	Egypt	A boat capsized and sank in the Nile River in Cairo, Egypt, killing five people and injuring nine others.

=== 31 July ===
List of shipwrecks: 31 July 2024
Ship	State	Description
Ethos	Italy	The 46-metre (150 ft) superyacht started sinking after a crewman left a side door open and started taking on water. She was run aground partly submerged in Paleokaravo Bay, Kefalonia, Greece.
Mirola 1 or Asia Ship	Philippines	The 54-metre (177 ft) cargo ship ran aground off Sitio Quiapo, Barangay Biaan, Mariveles, Bataan, in Manila Bay, the Philippines.

=== Unknown date ===
List of shipwrecks: unknown date July 2024
Ship	State	Description
Cita XX	Indonesia	The 35-metre (115 ft) landing craft tank disappeared after contacting another vessel on 16 July and failing to arrive at Yahukimo Regency, Highland Papua, Indonesia, on schedule on 18 July.
Monarch Countess	United States	The 360-foot (110 m) retired roll-on/roll-off ship was sunk as a target in the Gulf of Mexico off Destin, Florida in 180 feet (55 m) of water by a Northrop B-2 Spirit bomber aircraft in a QUICKSINK demonstration in July.

== August ==
=== 2 August ===
List of shipwrecks: 2 August 2024
Ship	State	Description
Rostov-on-Don	Russian Navy	Russian invasion of Ukraine: The Kilo-class submarine was reportedly sunk in a Ukrainian missile attack at Sevastopol, in occupied Crimea.

=== 7 August ===
List of shipwrecks: 7 August 2024
Ship	State	Description
God Bless Dixon	Nigeria	The wood cargo vessel exploded, caught fire and sank in a river at Ezetu, Nigeria. At least 20 people were killed.

=== 8 August ===
List of shipwrecks: 8 August 2024
Ship	State	Description
Jacqueline B	United States	The 59-foot (18 m) tugboat sprung a leak and sank 3 miles (4.8 km) off North Myrtle Beach, South Carolina in 30 feet (9.1 m) of water. Refloated on 21 August, but further inspection found the cost of repairs was more than the value of the towboat. The vessel was declared a total loss.

=== 10 August ===
List of shipwrecks: 22 August 2024
Ship	State	Description
Atina	Netherlands	The 47-metre (154 ft) superyacht sank after being on fire in the Gulf of Olbia, Olbia, Italy. All 16 on board were safely evacuated.

=== 16 August ===
List of shipwrecks: 16 August 2024
Ship	State	Description
Hannelore	Germany	The 88-metre (289 ft) tugboat ran aground off the Lindau Oil terminal and sank in the Danube near Passau, Germany, due to a defective valve and partially sank in 2.5 metres (8 ft 2 in) of water.
Minsk	China	The Kiev-class aircraft carrier was severely damaged by fire at Nantong.

=== 17 August ===
List of shipwrecks: 17 August 2024
Ship	State	Description
Min Long Yu 60877	China	The 30-metre (98 ft) fishing vessel sank after a collision with an unknown vessel 6.5 miles (10.5 km) off Dongding, Taiwan.

=== 18 August ===
List of shipwrecks: 18 August 2024
Ship	State	Description
Unknown boat	Flag unknown	A boat carrying over 250–300 people sank after striking submerged tree trunks in the Lukenie River, in Mai-Ndombe Province, Democratic Republic of the Congo, killing at least twenty nine people. 152 people were rescued and hundreds were reported missing, though many may have left the scene without being accounted for. The boat's manager was lynched by angry relatives.

=== 19 August ===
List of shipwrecks: 19 August 2024
Ship	State	Description
Bayesian	United Kingdom	The 49-metre (160 ft) sailing superyacht capsized and sank off Palermo, Sicily, Italy in 50 metres (160 ft) of water when struck by a tornado/waterspout. Fifteen of the 22 people on board were rescued, and seven were killed. The wreck was raised on 21 June 2025.

=== 21 August ===
List of shipwrecks: 21 August 2024
Ship	State	Description
Unknown barge	Unknown	The tugboat Waterlord and a 40-metre (130 ft) concrete barge she was towing ran aground on a reef off Hoddevika on the Stad peninsula, Norway. The tugboat was refloated, but the barge reportedly sank.

=== 22 August ===
List of shipwrecks: 22 August 2024
Ship	State	Description
Conro Trader	Russia	Russo-Ukrainian War: The 109-metre (358 ft) ro-ro cargo ferry loaded with 30 fuel tanks sank after being on fire in the port of Kavkaz after a Ukrainian attack. 17 crew members were rescued, while two others were reported missing.
Heemskerkgracht	Netherlands	The 138-metre (453 ft) cargo ship ran aground in the St. Lawrence Seaway near Montreal after losing power, blocking it. She was refloated on 24 August.

=== 25 August ===
List of shipwrecks: 25 August 2024
Ship	State	Description
ITT Puma	India	The 72.4-metre (238 ft) cargo ship sank around 90 nautical miles (170 km) south of Sagar Island, India, due to severe weather. Eleven crew were rescued by the Indian Coast Guard, three were reported missing.
KD Pendekar	Royal Malaysian Navy	The 43.6-metre (143 ft), 260-ton Handalan-class fast attack craft struck a submerged object and quickly sank in the South China Sea 2 nautical miles (3.7 km) southeast of Tanjung Penyusop in Kota Tinggi, Johor, Malaysia. All 39 crew members were rescued, bringing attention to the Royal Malaysian Navy's aging vessels.
Unknown boat	Unknown	A boat carrying migrants sank off Yemen. At least 13 people were killed and 14 were reported missing.

=== 27 August ===
List of shipwrecks: 22 August 2024
Ship	State	Description
Naddoddur	Faroe Islands	The 10-metre (33 ft) open viking sailboat capsized in rough seas and bad weather between the Faroe Islands and Norway. One American tourist died.

=== 30 August ===
List of shipwrecks: 30 August 2024
Ship	State	Description
Jig Strike	United States	The 56-foot (17 m) sportfishing boat took on water and sank 100 miles (160 km) off of Point Loma, San Diego, United States, after striking something underwater. All 17 people on board were rescued unharmed.

== September ==
=== 1 September ===
List of shipwrecks: 1 September 2024
Ship	State	Description
Arabakhtar I	Iran	The merchant ship capsized and sank in Kuwaiti waters. Lost with all six crew.

=== 2 September ===
List of shipwrecks: 2 September 2024
Ship	State	Description
ASC Regine	Philippines	Typhoon Yagi: The barge was driven ashore near Barangay Bagumbayan North.
EBC Maricel VI	Philippines	Typhoon Yagi: The tanker was driven ashore near Barangay San Roque, Navotas City.
Patriot III	Philippines	Typhoon Yagi: The 50-metre (160 ft), 793-ton bunkering tanker was driven ashore near Barangay Bagumbayan North.
TM1900	Malaysia	Typhoon Yagi: The 53-metre (174 ft), 867-ton deck barge was driven ashore near Rosario, Philippines.

=== 3 September ===
List of shipwrecks: 3 September 2024
Ship	State	Description
Spirit of Mateship	Australia	The 20-metre (66 ft) yacht lost power and communications and was being hit by winds of up to 90 kilometres per hour (56 mph) as well as waves up to 6 m (20 ft) high. She was abandoned in sinking condition nearly 320 kilometres (200 mi) off the coast of New South Wales. The two people on board were rescued by the New South Wales police vessel Nemesis.
Tor.94 and Tor.95	Royal Thai Navy	The decommissioned Royal Thai Navy Tor.91-class patrol boats were sunk as artificial reefs off Koh Chuang island, Chonburi province, Thailand.
Unknown boat	France	A boat carrying migrants that was travelling illegally from France, capsized in the English Channel, killing at least 14 people. More than 65 people were rescued.

=== 4 September ===
List of shipwrecks: 4 September 2024
Ship	State	Description
Oshio	Singapore	The tugboat sank in the eastern anchorage at Singapore. One crewman was rescued, but died at the hospital. One crewman was reported missing.
Unknown boat	Libya	A boat carrying 28 Syrian migrants traveling from Libya capsized and sank off the coast of Lampedusa, Pelagian Islands, Italy. Seven people were rescued, while 21 were reported missing.

=== 7 September ===
List of shipwrecks: 7 September 2024
Ship	State	Description
Bein Minh	Vietnam	Typhoon Yagi: The passenger vessel sank by the stern at Tuần Châu, Vietnam.
Do Thi Nga	Vietnam	Typhoon Yagi: The passenger vessel sank by the stern at Tuần Châu, Vietnam.
Hai Ninh	Vietnam	Typhoon Yagi: The passenger vessel sank by the stern at Tuần Châu, Vietnam.
QNg95109TS	Vietnam	Typhoon Yagi: The fishing vessel was sunk by waves at Ha Long, Vietnam. All five crew were rescued by a food processing vessel.
QNg95576TS	Vietnam	Typhoon Yagi: The fishing vessel was sunk by waves off Ha Long, Vietnam. All six crew swam to shore.
Unknown	Vietnam	Typhoon Yagi: A fishing vessel was sunk by waves at Ha Long, Vietnam. Both crewmen were rescued by a food processing vessel.
Victory Star	Vietnam	Typhoon Yagi: The passenger vessel was capsized by strong winds and partially sunk off Ha Long, Vietnam.
40	Vietnam	Typhoon Yagi: The passenger vessel sank by the stern at Tuần Châu, Vietnam.

=== 8 September ===
List of shipwrecks: 8 September 2024
Ship	State	Description
Unknown pirogue	Senegal	A pirogue, carrying migrants, capsized a few miles off Mbour, Senegal, in the Atlantic Ocean. 37 people were killed, 3 were rescued and 49 people were reported missing.

=== 9 September ===
List of shipwrecks: 9 September 2024
Ship	State	Description
Unknown dredger	Vietnam	Typhoon Yagi: A sand dredger was washed down stream by flood water on the Chay River, crashed into the To Mau bridge in Lục Yên district, Yên Bái province, Vietnam, and sank.

=== 14 September ===
List of shipwrecks: 14 September 2024
Ship	State	Description
Sara Lena BM30	United Kingdom	The 16-metre (52 ft) fishing vessel ran aground on rocks in Ardglass harbour, Northern Ireland, sinking the next day.
Unknown boat	Nigeria	A boat capsized and sank in the Gummi River at Gummi, Nigeria. 64 of the 70 farmers on board were killed, and 6 were rescued.

=== 15 September ===
List of shipwrecks: 15 September 2024
Ship	State	Description
Unknown boat	France	A boat carrying 59 people attempting to cross the English Channel ran aground and was torn apart by rocks off the coast of Ambleteuse, France, killing eight people. Six survivors were hospitalized.

=== 16 September ===
List of shipwrecks: 16 September 2024
Ship	State	Description
Unknown fishing vessel	South Korea	A 35-ton fishing vessel capsized off Gunsan, South Korea. Eight crew were rescued with three dying later.

=== 18 September ===
List of shipwrecks: 18 September 2024
Ship	State	Description
An Binh Phat 68	Vietnam	The cargo vessel sank in the South China Sea off Quảng Nam Seaport, Quảng Nam province, Vietnam. All eight crew members were rescued by the Vietnam Coast Guard.
Shingle	Moldova	The 54-metre (177 ft) cargo vessel was scuttled off Killala Bay, County Mayo, Ireland as an artificial reef. .
The Admiral	United States	The 100-foot (30 m) yacht burned and sank in Basin A, Marina del Rey, California, after fireworks and ammunition caught fire aboard the vessel.

=== 19 September ===
List of shipwrecks: 19 September 2024
Ship	State	Description
Adolph Jensen	Greenland	The 30-metre (98 ft), 70-ton research vessel ran aground on a reef and sank off Greenland. All four crew members were rescued.
BV 99778 TS	Vietnam	The fishing vessel was sunk in a collision with the cargo ship Transformer Ol (Panama) 22 nautical miles (41 km; 25 mi) southeast of Côn Đảo Island off Bà Rịa–Vũng Tàu province, Vietnam. Twelve crew were rescued by the fishing vessels BV 99359 TS and BV 99278 TS (both Vietnam). One person was killed and one reported missing.

=== 21 September ===
List of shipwrecks: 21 September 2024
Ship	State	Description
Unknown boat	Mauritania	A boat carrying migrants sank about 4 miles (6.4 km) east of El Hierro, Canary Islands, Spain, in the Atlantic Ocean. Nine people were killed and 48 people were reported missing.

=== 26 September ===
List of shipwrecks: 26 September 2024
Ship	State	Description
Chantase G	Venezuela	The 37-metre (121 ft) work boat sank in poor weather in Lake Maracaibo. Four people were killed and 19 rescued.
George Sejahtera	Indonesia	The cargo ship sprang a leak and was beached to prevent sinking off Linau, west of Lampung, Sumatra, Indonesia.

=== Unknown date ===
List of shipwrecks: unknown September 2024
Ship	State	Description
Unknown boats	Unknown	Two boats carrying migrants capsized and sank just 150 metres (490 ft) from a beach near Khôr ʽAngar, Djibouti. Rescue operations began on 30 September. 45 people were killed and 115 were rescued.

== October ==
=== 1 October ===
List of shipwrecks: 1 October 2024
Ship	State	Description
Blue Lagoon	Barbados	Typhoon Krathon: The bulk carrier sprang a leak in the engine room and was abandoned. The crew were removed by Taiwan Coast Guard helicopters, around 18 miles (29 km) southwest of Orchid Island, Taiwan. Blue Lagoon drifted ashore on Orchid Island. A contract was issued in February 2025 to salvage her.

=== 2 October ===
List of shipwrecks: 2 October 2024
Ship	State	Description
Unknown boat	Nigeria	A boat capsized and sank in the Niger River, near Mokwa, Nigeria, with nearly 300 people on board. 150 people were rescued, with the remainder reported missing.

=== 3 October ===
List of shipwrecks: 3 October 2024
Ship	State	Description
Merdy	Democratic Republic of the Congo	The ferry capsized and sank at Kituku on Lake Kivu only 100 metres (330 ft) from its destination. Of the 278 people on board, at least 58 were rescued or swam to shore, and, by 4 October, at least 78 were confirmed dead.

=== 5 October ===
List of shipwrecks: 5 October 2024
Ship	State	Description
HMNZS Manawanui	Royal New Zealand Navy	The dive and survey vessel ran aground on a reef near the southern coast of Upolu, Samoa. The crew abandoned ship in liferafts. She caught fire, capsized and sank on 6 October.

=== 11 October ===
List of shipwrecks: 11 October 2024
Ship	State	Description
Annika	Germany	The 73-metre (240 ft) German chemical/oil tanker loaded with 640 tonnes (630 long tons; 710 short tons) of oil caught fire off the Baltic Sea coast in Northern Germany.

=== 12 October ===
List of shipwrecks: 12 October 2024
Ship	State	Description
Humadivi	Belgium	The 67-metre (220 ft)-long cargo ship loaded with sand collided with a weir near Borgharen and sank in the Meuse river. No crew were injured. Several days later the flooded barge was towed to Beatrixhaven, where it was pumped out and placed on a barge to be transported for repairs.

=== 13 October ===
List of shipwrecks: 13 October 2024
Ship	State	Description
Armana	South Africa	The 41-metre (135 ft), 389-ton fishing vessel caught fire in the South Atlantic Ocean 60 nautical miles (110 km) south of Gansbaai on the Western Cape, South Africa, sinking the next day.
Duplo	Norway	The workboat sank in Sortlandssundet, south of Bremnes. All crew were rescued by a nearby fishing boat.

=== 14 October ===
List of shipwrecks: 14 October 2024
Ship	State	Description
Unknown cargo ship	United Arab Emirates	A cargo ship loaded with cars began taking on water in severe weather and sank in the Persian Gulf about 50 kilometres (31 mi) from the port of Asaluyeh. All crew were rescued.

=== 15 October ===
List of shipwrecks: 15 October 2024
Ship	State	Description
Princesse Jessica	Togo	The cargo ship was rammed by Zografia (Malta), then capsized and sank at dock in Dakar, Senegal. All three crew on board escaped.

=== 18 October ===
List of shipwrecks: 18 October 2024
Ship	State	Description
Grigory Lovtsov	Russia	The 41-metre (135 ft), 194-ton cargo ship capsized in the Sea of Okhotsk off Sakhalin Island, Russia.

=== 22 October ===
List of shipwrecks: 22 October 2024
Ship	State	Description
Sta. Monica-A1	Philippines	Tropical Storm Trami: The cargo ship sank off Paluan, Mindoro, Philippines in rough seas caused by the tropical storm. The vessel was lost with all ten crew.

=== 24 October ===
List of shipwrecks: 24 October 2024
Ship	State	Description
LCT ASC Big Boy	Philippines	Tropical Storm Trami: The tank landing craft was driven ashore about 49 metres (160 ft) from Barangay Sugod after her anchor chain broke.
LCT Golden Bella	Philippines	Tropical Storm Trami: The tank landing craft was driven ashore off the coast of Minglanilla, Cebu after her anchor chain broke.
MTKR Cassandra	Philippines	Tropical Storm Trami: The tanker dragged anchor and was driven ashore in Barangay Buenlag by storm surge.
Super Shuttle Roro 2	Philippines	Tropical Storm Trami: The 90-metre (300 ft), 1,463-ton ro-ro vehicle carrier went aground in Batangas Bay at Batangas, Philippines.
Xavier 1	Philippines	Tropical Storm Trami: The dredge dragged anchor and was driven ashore in Barangay Buenlag by storm surge.

=== 27 October ===
List of shipwrecks: 27 October 2024
Ship	State	Description
Maristela 2	Philippines	The tugboat sank on the Iloilo River while berthed along Muelle Loney, Iloilo City, Panay, Philippines. Her mooring lines were too tight causing her to list and sink on the rising tide.

=== 28 October ===
List of shipwrecks: 28 October 2024
Ship	State	Description
Svanen West	Sweden	The 24-metre (79 ft) charter vessel sank at dock in the Göta älv river at Gothenburg, Sweden.

=== 29 October ===
List of shipwrecks: 29 October 2024
Ship	State	Description
Odyssey FR70	United Kingdom	The 23-metre (75 ft), 140-ton fishing vessel sank in the North Sea some 230 kilometres (140 mi) east of the Firth of Forth, Scotland. The vessel's crew were rescued from a liferaft by a fishing vessel.

=== 31 October ===
List of shipwrecks: 31 October 2024
Ship	State	Description
Yu Zhou Qi Hang	China	Typhoon Kong-rey: The 142-metre (465 ft 11 in), 12,135-ton heavy-lift ship suffered engine failure on 30 October in rough weather after leaving Keelung, Taiwan. She was driven ashore at Yehliu Geopark, northeast of Taipei, and sank on 31 October. The Taiwan Coast Guard rescued her crew before the ship grounded.

=== Unknown date ===
List of shipwrecks: unknown date October 2024
Ship	State	Description
Karina Olsen	United Kingdom	The out-of-service 17-metre (56 ft) fishing trawler sank in Penzance harbor sometime in October. The wreck will be removed.

== November ==
=== 1 November ===
List of shipwrecks: 1 November 2024
Ship	State	Description
Unknown	Unknown	A fishing vessel was caught in the collision of the LPG tanker Era Star (Liberia) and the cargo ship Mizan and sank in the Pashur Channel near Bagerhat, Bangladesh.

=== 3 November ===
List of shipwrecks: 3 November 2024
Ship	State	Description
Unknown	Unknown	A fishing vessel ran aground in Praia Grande Bay on Macau Island near the Macao-Taipa Bridge after striking the protective barrier of the bridge.

=== 8 November ===
List of shipwrecks: 8 November 2024
Ship	State	Description
Aries 1	Unknown	Typhoon Marce: The cargo ship dragged anchor at Currimao, and was driven ashore at Barangay Victoria, Ilocos Norte, Luzon, Philippines by strong waves and winds from the typhoon.
LCT PanPhil 8	Unknown	Typhoon Marce: The 86-metre (282 ft) landing craft tank dragged anchor and was driven ashore at Currimao, Ilocos Norte, Luzon, Philippines by strong waves and winds from the typhoon.
135 Geumseong Lake	South Korea	The 129-ton fishing vessel sank 24 kilometres (15 mi) north west of Biyang Island, Jeju City, Jeju Province, South Korea in 80 to 90 metres (260 to 300 ft) of water. She is expected to be raised. 15 crew were rescued, including two who were found unconscious and later pronounced dead, while 12 others were reported missing.

=== 10 November ===
List of shipwrecks: 10 November 2024
Ship	State	Description
Ukushima	Japan Maritime Self-Defense Force	The 54-metre (177 ft), 510-ton minesweeper caught fire in the engine room 2.5 kilometres (1.6 mi) off Oshima Island, Munakata, Fukuoka Prefecture. She capsized and sank on 11 November. Thirty-nine of her crew were rescued, while one was reported missing.

=== 15 November ===
List of shipwrecks: 15 November 2024
Ship	State	Description
Princ Zadra	Croatia	The 38-metre (125 ft), 147-ton catamaran ferry ran aground on rocks in the Adriatic Sea off Premuda, Croatia. The next day she slid off the rocks and sank in 50 metres (160 ft) of water.

=== 23 November ===
List of shipwrecks: 23 November 2024
Ship	State	Description
Martyna	Poland	The 75-metre (246 ft) self-propelled barge collided with an unnamed self-propelled barge in the Wesel-Datteln Canal near Hünxe, Germany, and was run aground to prevent sinking.
Shoei Maru	Japan	The 14-metre (46 ft), 19-ton tugboat collided with Yiannis N. G. (Marshall Islands) causing her to capsize in Osaka Bay near Kobe, Japan.
Tim S. Dool	Canada	The lake freighter ran aground in the St. Lawrence River near Massena, New York. Unable to free the ship with tugboats, the vessel had to be lightered and was freed on 16 December.

=== 25 November ===
List of shipwrecks: 25 November 2024
Ship	State	Description
El Cañavera	Spain	The 17-metre (56 ft) fishing vessel sank in the Bay of Biscay some 1.3 miles (2.1 km) off Punta Candelaria, Spain. The crew were rescued from liferafts by the fishing vessel Brisas de Cedeira (Spain).
Sea Story	Egypt	2024 Red Sea tourist boat disaster: The 144-foot (44 m) luxury tourist motor yacht sank in the Red Sea off the coast of Marsa Alam after being struck by a large wave causing it to capsize.

== December ==
=== 1 December ===
List of shipwrecks: 1 December 2024
Ship	State	Description
Wind Walker	United States	The 52-foot (16 m) fishing vessel, sent out a mayday call at 12:10 a.m. that she was overturning in a snowstorm off Point Couverden (58.1906°N 135.0556°W in the Alexander Archipelago in Southeast Alaska at the confluence of Icy Strait and Lynn Canal. Further attempts to contact the crew were met with no response. All five people aboard — the vessel's captain and four crew members — were reported missing.

=== 2 December ===
List of shipwrecks: 2 December 2024
Ship	State	Description
Unidentified boat	China	A boat capsized in the Pingzheng River in Congjiang County in Guizhou, China. Eight people were killed and five rescued.
VSG Glory	Comoros	The cargo ship, carrying 4,000 metric tons (3,900 long tons; 4,400 short tons) of bran, 70 tons of fuel oil and 50 tons of diesel from Yemen to Port Tawfik, Egypt, began sinking after taking on seawater in the engine room in the Red Sea off Al-Qusayr, Egypt after running aground ten days earlier. All 21 crew were safely rescued.

=== 4 December ===
List of shipwrecks: 4 December 2024
Ship	State	Description
Al Piranpir	India	The cargo ship sank in the northern Arabian Sea from flooding due to rough sea conditions. The crew of 12 was rescued from a lifeboat approximately 270 kilometres (170 mi) west of Dwarka, India.

=== 7 December ===
List of shipwrecks: 7 December 2024
Ship	State	Description
Liquid Gem	Panama	The products tanker drifted in Force 10 weather and ran aground near Taichung, Taiwan. Twelve crew were rescued using a crane after grounding, three abandoned ship before grounding, two were rescued, and one was reported missing.

=== 9 December ===
List of shipwrecks: 9 December 2024
Ship	State	Description
Amadeus Gold	Netherlands	The cargo ship ran aground in Odense Fjord, Denmark.
Geungwang	South Korea	The 29-ton fishing vessel capsized after colliding with a 456-ton sand barge off Gyeongju, South Korea. Seven crew were killed and one was reported missing.

=== 10 December ===
List of shipwrecks: 10 December 2024
Ship	State	Description
Unidentified naval vessels	Syrian Navy	Syrian Civil War: Many Syrian Navy vessels, including six missile boats, were destroyed by Israeli Navy missile boats at Latakia and Minet el-Beida following the collapse of the Assad regime.

=== 11 December ===
List of shipwrecks: 11 December 2024
Ship	State	Description
Paralogamatha	India	The fishing vessel was damaged and sank after being struck by LPG tanker Nuss (Comoros) (probably false flag) 25 nautical miles off Colachel, India. Crew rescued just before she sank 4 hours later by other fishing boats.

=== 14 December ===
List of shipwrecks: 14 December 2024
Ship	State	Description
Premier-Maître L'Her	French Navy	The decommissioned D'Estienne d'Orves-class aviso was sunk in the Atlantic Ocean during a naval exercise by a submarine testing the new F21 heavy torpedo.

=== 15 December ===
List of shipwrecks: 15 December 2024
Ship	State	Description
Gia Bao 19	Vietnam	The 1,900-ton 69.39-metre (227 ft 8 in) cargo ship foundered off Thừa Thiên Huế province, Vietnam, after a pipe broke. Seven crewmembers were rescued by Haian Park (Vietnam), two others by a fishing vessel.
Unknown fishing vessel	China	A fishing vessel foundered off Yazhou, Hainan, China. Seven crewmembers were rescued.
Volgoneft-212	Russia	2024 Kerch Strait oil spill: The 136-metre (446 ft) oil tanker split in two in the Kerch Strait in a storm and sinking after running aground. One crewmember died of hypothermia and 13 were rescued. Fuel oil was salvaged from the submerged stern in mid-August, 2026, but satellite imagery on Aug 26 showed oil films near the wreck. Salvage of hull is expected.
Volgoneft-239	Russia	2024 Kerch Strait oil spill: The 132-metre (433 ft) oil tanker broke in two. The bow sank and the rest ran aground 80 m (260 ft) from shore near the port of Taman, Russia at the south end of the Kerch Strait in a storm. All 14 crewmembers were rescued the next day. Fuel oil was salvaged from the submerged bow in mid-August, 2026, but satellite imagery on Aug 26 showed oil films near the wreck. Salvage of hull is expected.

=== 18 December ===
List of shipwrecks: 18 December 2024
Ship	State	Description
Neel Kamal	India	The ferry sank after being rammed by an out-of-control Indian Navy rigid inflatable boat at Mumbai, India. 99 people were rescued, with at least 12 civilians and 3 Navy sailors killed.
Theodore Too	Canada	The large-scale imitation 65-foot (20 m) tugboat took on water and partly sank at dock in St. Catharines, Ontario, Canada.
Triton 1	Canada	The workboat capsized and sank in 200-metre (660 ft) of water in a collision with tug Haisla Northwind and barge BSG Lubricator, both (Canada) in the harbor at Squamish, British Columbia, Canada.

=== 21 December ===
List of shipwrecks: 21 December 2024
Ship	State	Description
Kuala Mas	Indonesia	The cargo ship drifted into product tanker Maritim Khatulistiwa (Indonesia) and was holed at Kupang, Indonesia. An attempt to beach the vessel was made but she listed and sank mostly submerged and on her side.

=== 23 December ===
List of shipwrecks: 23 December 2024
Ship	State	Description
Amnah	Comoros	The container ship listed and sank partly submerged and on her side at dock at Ambarlı, Turkey. One crewmember suffered minor injuries.
Maelys II	Togo	The 75-metre (246 ft), 1,392-ton, ro-ro cargo vessel capsized and partially sank in Port-au-Prince Bay at dock at des Varreux, Port-au-Prince, Haiti. Seven crew were killed and 17 injured. The vessel was expected to be salvaged.

=== 24 December ===
List of shipwrecks: 24 December 2024
Ship	State	Description
Maccoa	Cyprus	The 185-metre (607 ft) bulk carrier ran aground in the St. Lawrence River near Verchères, Quebec. The ship was freed on 7 January 2025.
Ursa Major	Russia	The heavy-lift ship sank in the Mediterranean Sea between Spain and Algeria, two days after an explosion in her engine room. Spanish vessels rescued 14 survivors. Two other crew were reported missing.

=== 26 December ===
List of shipwrecks: 26 December 2024
Ship	State	Description
Taj Dhare Haram	India	The 37-metre (121 ft) sailing vessel took on water and sank in the Arabian Sea in bad weather. Her nine-man crew was rescued from a life raft by ICGS Shoor (India).

=== 29 December ===
List of shipwrecks: 29 December 2024
Ship	State	Description
Meghna Prinesss	Bangladesh	The bulk carrier ran aground, being thrown off course by a GPS jammer. She struck an underwater rock near Ust-Luga, Russia, in the Gulf of Finland. The ship was refloated on 7 March 2025.
Patrick J. Studdert	United States	The 28-metre (92 ft) tugboat was sunk in a collision with the tanker Clara B (Liberia) in the Mississippi River near the Hale Boggs Bridge in Luling, Louisiana. Five crew were rescued.

=== 30 December ===
List of shipwrecks: 30 December 2024
Ship	State	Description
Jerlyn Kathness	Philippine	The 170-foot (52 m), 199-gross ton cargo ship capsized and sank in heavy seas in the San Bernardino Strait off Lavezares, Samar, Philippines. One crew member was killed.
Unnamed ferry	South Korea	The 83-ton ferry capsized in Garorim Bay off Gopado Island near Seosan, South Korea. The South Korean Coast Guard rescued two crew. Her master suffered a heart attack and died, while four other crew were reported missing.

=== 31 December ===
List of shipwrecks: 31 December 2024
Ship	State	Description
Ocean Pure 1	Indonesia	The 34-metre (112 ft), 396-ton ketch burned to the waterline and sank in the Halmahera Sea while anchored off Waigeo Island, Indonesia. All 18 crew and 10 passengers on board abandoned ship into the vessel's lifeboats. The crew and passengers safely landed on Yefinat Island.

== Unknown date ==
List of shipwrecks: unknown date
Ship	State	Description
Unknown submarine	People's Liberation Army Navy	A new Type 041, NATO designation Zhou-class attack submarine, allegedly sank in dock on the Yangtze River at the Wuchang Shipyard near Wuhan, China. The ship was observed fitting out in late May and crane barges arrived in early June to attempt salvage.
