= 2024 Red Sea tourist boat disaster =

2024 boat sinking

- Date: 24 November 2024
- Time: between 02 h and 03 h a.m. (GMT)
- Location: 24°55′59″N 35°34′17″E
- Cause: Capsizing
- Participants: 46
- Deaths: 11
- Missing: 7

On 25 November 2024 the tourist boat Sea Story sank in the Red Sea. In the immediate aftermath, sixteen people were confirmed missing, including twelve foreigners and four Egyptians, while 28 others were rescued. The survivors were found in the Wadi El Gemal area of the sea. The warship El Fateh of the Egyptian Navy assisted in the rescue. The next day, four people were found dead, while the number of missing was lowered to seven as five more were rescued alive.

The boat was carrying 30 tourists from Britain, USA, China, Finland, Poland, Germany, Switzerland, Belgium, Norway, Slovakia and Spain as well as 12 crew and 4 dive guides.

On 19 May 2025, Egyptian authorities officially declared all seven people missing from the incident, including five foreign tourists (two British, two Polish, and one German) and two Egyptians, as dead.

== Background ==
The Red Sea coast is a major tourist destination in Egypt; however, dozens of dive boats operate every day with unevenly enforced safety regulations. Earlier in November 2024, 30 people were rescued from a sinking boat near the Daedalus reef; in June 2024 24 French tourists were evacuated before the boat sank, and in 2023 three British tourists died after a fire broke out on their vessel.

A March 2024 Maritime Survey International report examining Red Sea dive boats found none of the inspected vessels had "a planned maintenance system, safety management system or stability books" and concluded the industry "plies its trade largely unregulated".

=== Ship ===
History

Egypt
- Name: M/Y Sea Story
- Operator: Dive Pro Liveaboard
- Launched: 2022
- Out of service: 25 November 2024
- Fate: Capsized

General characteristics
- Class & type: Motor yacht
- Length: 44 m (144 ft 4 in)
- Decks: 4
- Speed: 20 kn (37 km/h; 23 mph) max speed, 14 kn (26 km/h; 16 mph) cruising speed
- Capacity: 36 passengers in 18 cabins
- Crew: 12

- A photo of the boat involved

The M/Y Sea Story was a four-deck motor yacht built out of wood in 2022. Measuring 44 m (144 ft) in length and 9 m (30 ft) in width, it was designed to accommodate 36 passengers and 12 crew members, including a captain, mechanical engineer, two cooks, two waiters, and six sailors. It was equipped with three generators, a Nitrox diving system, and three Coltri compressors. Two Zodiac speed boats, measuring 6.5 and 5.5 m (21 and 18 ft) with 75 kW (100 hp) and 30 kW (40 hp) outboard motors respectively, supported diving activities. The yacht’s amenities featured 18 air-conditioned cabins with en-suite bathrooms, including four honeymoon suites, a lounge with a bar and entertainment system, and a separate dining area.

== Sinking ==
Sea Story had left Port Ghalib near Marsa Alam on 23 November for a diving trip of seven days and was due to dock on 29 November in Hurghada. The Egyptian Meteorological Authority had warned of expected high seas on 24 and 25 November and advised against maritime activity for both days.

According to Amr Hanafi, the governor of the Red Sea, a large wave struck the boat causing it to capsize and sink 46 nmi (85 km; 53 mi) from the shore off Marsa Alam in 5–7 minutes, before coming to rest mostly submerged about 12 m (39 ft) below the water line, with about 0.5 m (1.6 ft) above the water line. However, the claims about a large wave are disputed by survivors of the incident and an oceanographer, Dr. S. Boxhall of University of Southampton. He stated that waves were likely only 1.5 m (4.9 ft).

The vessel capsized between 02:00 and 3:00 a.m., while the first distress signal was not received by the Red Sea control center until 5:30 a.m.

== Rescue response ==
28 people were rescued the day of the sinking, many having been lost at sea for hours before being found by rescue vessels. Some of the survivors were airlifted for medical treatment, while others were assisted on the vessels until a military frigate transported them back to shore. Red Sea Governor Major General Amr Hanafi indicated that military aircraft and naval units were still searching the day of the rescue for those still unaccounted for. At this time, five additional survivors remained trapped in air pockets within the wreck for 35 hours before being rescued by volunteer civilian divers.

The day after the sinking it was announced that five people – two Belgians, one Egyptian, one Finnish and one Swiss national – were recovered alive while four others were recovered dead.

While authorities have not confirmed nationalities of the tourists, the Chinese embassy reported that two of their citizens were rescued; the Finnish foreign ministry that one of their citizens were missing; and the Polish foreign ministry confirmed that two of the tourists may have had Polish citizenship.

On 2 December 2024, the search for the rescue of the seven missing people was called off, but there was no official confirmation by the coast guard.

== Safety deficiencies ==
The rescue operation revealed significant deficiencies in the vessel's safety equipment and emergency response. While survivors reached the life rafts, they found them lacking the emergency supplies promised in safety briefings, including food, water, and functional lighting equipment. Life jackets were equipped with non-functioning emergency lights, crucial for nighttime visibility. That was consistent with reviews of past customers who have complained about the lack of standards and safety equipment aboard the ships owned by the same company that owned the Sea Story.

According to officials the boat had been inspected in March 2024 and there had been no issues found, and it had obtained a license for a year. However, divers who have dived with the company speculate that the boat was not as young as the owners claimed and that it wasn't built for open water. Passengers also claimed that the boat appeared unstable prior to the sinking and items on deck had shifted significantly, and a small inflatable zodiac had gone overboard.

== Aftermath ==
=== Tightening of regulations ===
In response to safety concerns raised by the incident, authorities began enforcing stricter requirements for crew qualifications and ship registrations. These regulations mandate that each vessel must have two licensed captains (one with a master mariner patent and one with a minor patent) and two trained mechanics with advanced engineering licenses. Additionally, all crew members must be formally registered with the ship, linking their names to its operational permit.

While aimed at improving safety and accountability, these measures have led to widespread logistical and operational challenges due to a lack of qualified personnel, delays in issuing licenses, and the rigidity of the crew registration process. Operators have reported being vulnerable to extortion from crew members and struggling to find replacements for sudden absences, further complicating compliance. The new rules have sparked debates within the industry, with many calling for more practical solutions to balance safety concerns with operational feasibility.

=== Safety concerns of Red Sea dive boats ===
On 16 December 2024, the UK’s Marine Accident Investigation Branch (MAIB) raised serious concerns about the safety of Red Sea dive boats after the Sea Story capsized. This marked the third major Red Sea dive boat accident involving UK citizens in 20 months, following the Carlton Queen capsizing in April 2023 and the Hurricane fire in June 2023. In response to these incidents, the MAIB has issued a letter to the Egyptian Authority for Maritime Safety highlighting its concerns and is preparing a safety bulletin to guide British divers considering dive holidays in the region. UK Foreign Office travel advice also cautions that safety standards among Red Sea diving operators vary significantly, with lower-cost providers often failing to meet adequate safety or insurance requirements.

=== Investigation controversy ===
According to BBC reports, the survivors were pressured to sign Arabic statements translated by an employee of Dive Pro Liveaboard company. Multiple survivors reported they were not allowed to keep copies of their statements and said critical safety concerns were omitted from official documentation. The boat operator's representatives allegedly tried to have survivors sign waivers stating they "do not accuse anyone of any criminal wrongdoing."

== See also ==
- List of shipwrecks in 2024
- 2025 Red Sea tourist submarine disaster
