= Iberian orca attacks =

Ramming attacks on boats since 2020

Beginning in 2020, a subpopulation of orcas (Orcinus orca) began ramming boats and attacking their rudders in waters off the Iberian Peninsula. The behaviour has generally been directed towards slow-moving, medium-sized sailboats in the Strait of Gibraltar and off the Portuguese, Moroccan and Galician coasts. The novel behaviour is thought to have spread between different pods, with over 500 reported interactions from 2020 to 2026 attributed to fifteen different individual orcas (the exact number is still debated between certain scientists).

== Background ==
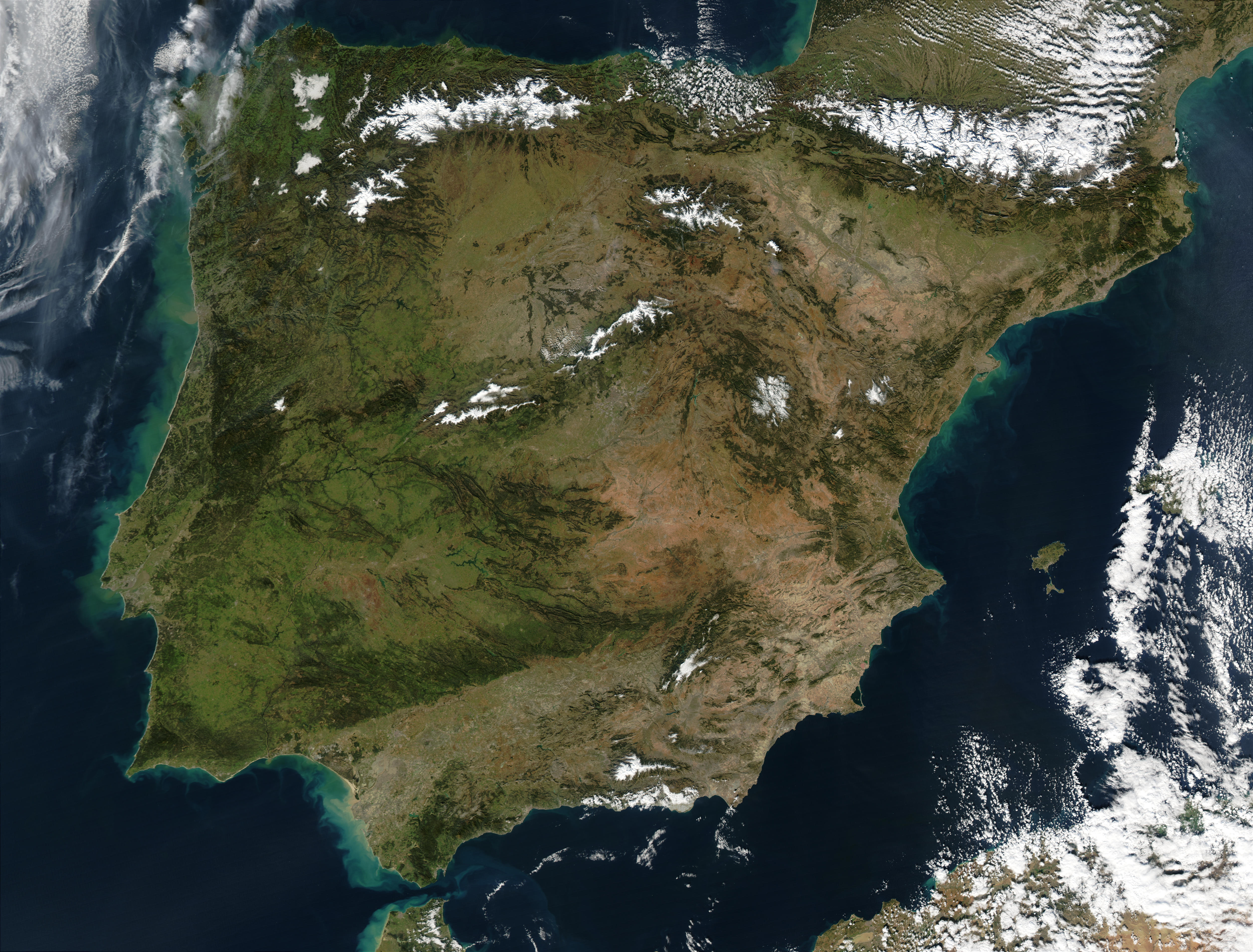
The Iberian orca subpopulation migrates along the Iberian coast, from the Strait of Gibraltar up to the Galician coast.

The orcas follow the seasonal migration of Atlantic bluefin tuna (Thunnus thynnus), their primary food source, gathering in the early spring in the Strait of Gibraltar. Through the summer, they remain in the Strait before travelling north along the coast of Portugal and Spain's Galicia, then head to deeper waters in the fall. While orcas typically engage in persistence hunting, two of the residential orca pods have been seen depredating fish from Moroccan and Spanish fishery droplines.

A complete census of the Iberian orca subpopulation was undertaken in 2011, finding 39 members divided into five pods. The subpopulation was listed as endangered by the Spanish National Catalogue of Endangered Species the same year and as critically endangered in the International Union for the Conservation of Nature's Red List in 2019.

=== The Gladises ===
Fifteen individual Iberian orcas involved in the interactions have been identified through photography and witness descriptions. All orcas believed to have been involved in interactions with ships are given the designation "Gladis". The name is a reference to the old scientific name for orcas, Orcinus gladiator, which means "whale-fighter" in Latin.

In a 2022 journal article analysing photographic evidence and testimonies from the incidents, 31 distinct orcas were identified, nine of which had direct contact with vessels and were given the designation Gladis. Two pods of orcas were identified, one including the adult Gladis Blanca (White Gladis), her offspring, Gladis Filabres (b. 2021), and her sisters, Gladis Dalila and Gladis Clara. Gladis Blanca's mother, Gladis Lamari, was also observed but never approached the vessel. The second residential pod consists of three juveniles, Gladis Gris (Grey Gladis) and the siblings Gladis Peque and Gladis Negra (Black Gladis), as well as their mother Gladis Herbille, who was also occasionally observed during the interactions but did not participate. By 2023, the number of Gladises had increased to 15.

== Method of attack ==
In interactions where orcas have come in physical contact with vessels, the pod typically approaches stealthily from the stern. Contact with the vessels includes ramming, nudging, and biting, usually focusing on the rudder. Orcas have been observed using their heads to push the rudder or using their bodies to make lever movements, causing the rotation of the rudder and "in some cases pivoting the boat almost 360°". Inspection of vessels reporting physical contact revealed that orcas had raked their teeth against the bow, keel, and rudders. More seriously damaged rudders were split in half, completely detached, or bent at their stocks. At least one orca has been observed tearing off a boat rudder with its teeth.

Hundreds of yachts have been attacked, all slow-moving with large rudders. Monohulled sailing vessels are the most frequent targets of the orcas, with yachts, catamarans, and vessels with spade rudders being the types most often attacked and damaged. The vessels reporting interactions have been an average of 12 metres in length and were travelling, on average, at 5.93 knots, a speed easily matched by orcas. Interactions between the orcas and vessels have occurred most frequently during the day, peaking around midday, and usually last for less than half an hour, though engagements up to two hours have been reported. Attempts by crews to control the wheel or increase the speed of their vessel have often resulted in more frequent and forceful pushes from the orcas. The orcas usually lose interest after the human crews slow or stop their vessels.

== History of interactions ==
Between 2020 and 2023, there were approximately 500 recorded interactions between orcas and vessels. Over 250 boats have been damaged by the orcas and four vessels have sunk. The frequency of attacks has increased over time. From July until November 2020, 52 orca interactions were reported. The behaviour continued into 2021, with another 197 interactions recorded, and into 2022, with 207 interactions. Researchers from the Atlantic Orca Working Group reported that only 20 percent of vessels having physical interactions with the orcas had been severely damaged. No humans have been harmed during any of the interactions.

The first reported orca-boat interaction occurred in the Strait of Gibraltar in May 2020. Other incidents were reported in July of that year, both in the Strait and off the coast of Portugal. Later in mid-August, interactions between orcas and vessels were observed in northern Spain, off of Galicia.

=== Sunken vessels ===
A sailboat with five passengers sank following an orca encounter in July 2022. Another sailboat, a Beneteau 393 Oceanis Smousse, with four people aboard sank in November 2022.

During an incident in the Strait of Gibraltar on 4 May 2023, the Swiss sailing yacht Champagne was running under engine when it was set upon by three orcas. The larger orca rammed the vessel from the side, while two smaller orcas shook the rudder. The rudder was pierced and had two holes and the quadrant was broken off. A crewmember reported that the two smaller orcas were copying the behaviour of the larger one, ramming into the rudder and the keel. The crew was rescued by the Spanish coast guard and the vessel was towed to the port of Barbate, where it capsized at the entrance.

On 31 October 2023, the yacht Grazie Mamma II had an encounter with a pod of orcas. The orcas interacted with the yacht for 45 minutes, bumping against the blade of the rudder, causing damage and leaks. No humans were harmed and the vessel sank near the entrance to the port of Tanger-Med.

On 12 May 2024, the Spanish yacht Alboran Cognac was attacked by orcas and holed. Both people on board were rescued by a tanker. The yacht consequently sank in the Strait of Gibraltar.

On 26 July 2024, in a similar incident, orcas attacked and sank the British sailing yacht Bonhomie William in the Strait of Gibraltar. All three people on board were rescued by Spanish coastguards.

On 13 September 2025, a tourist yacht carrying five people was repeatedly struck and subsequently sank, near Fonte da Telha Beach, off the coast of Portugal. All five were rescued after sending a distress call. A little later on the same day, another boat was similarly attacked but did not sink, further north off the Bay of Cascais.

On 10 October 2025 orcas sank the French yacht Ti'fare 50 nautical miles off the coast of Peniche, Portugal. The crew, a family of five, launched a lifeboat and was picked up by a fishing boat. Two more yachts were attacked during that weekend, forcing Spanish marine rescue to tow them.

In the 1970s Reader's Digest magazine published an article describing an English family headed by Dougal Robertson transiting the Pacific in their yacht. They were rammed by a pod of juvenile orcas causing irreparable damage. The family described that the juvenile orca pod were chased away by an adult pod of orcas. The family had to abandon their yacht for their life raft. The article was mostly focused on their month of survival in the Atlantic before eventually being rescued.

=== North Sea incident ===
An incident involving an orca ramming a yacht in the North Sea near Shetland occurred in June 2023. The interaction led to speculation that the Iberian orca behaviour was "leapfrogging through the various pods/communities".

== Possible motivations ==
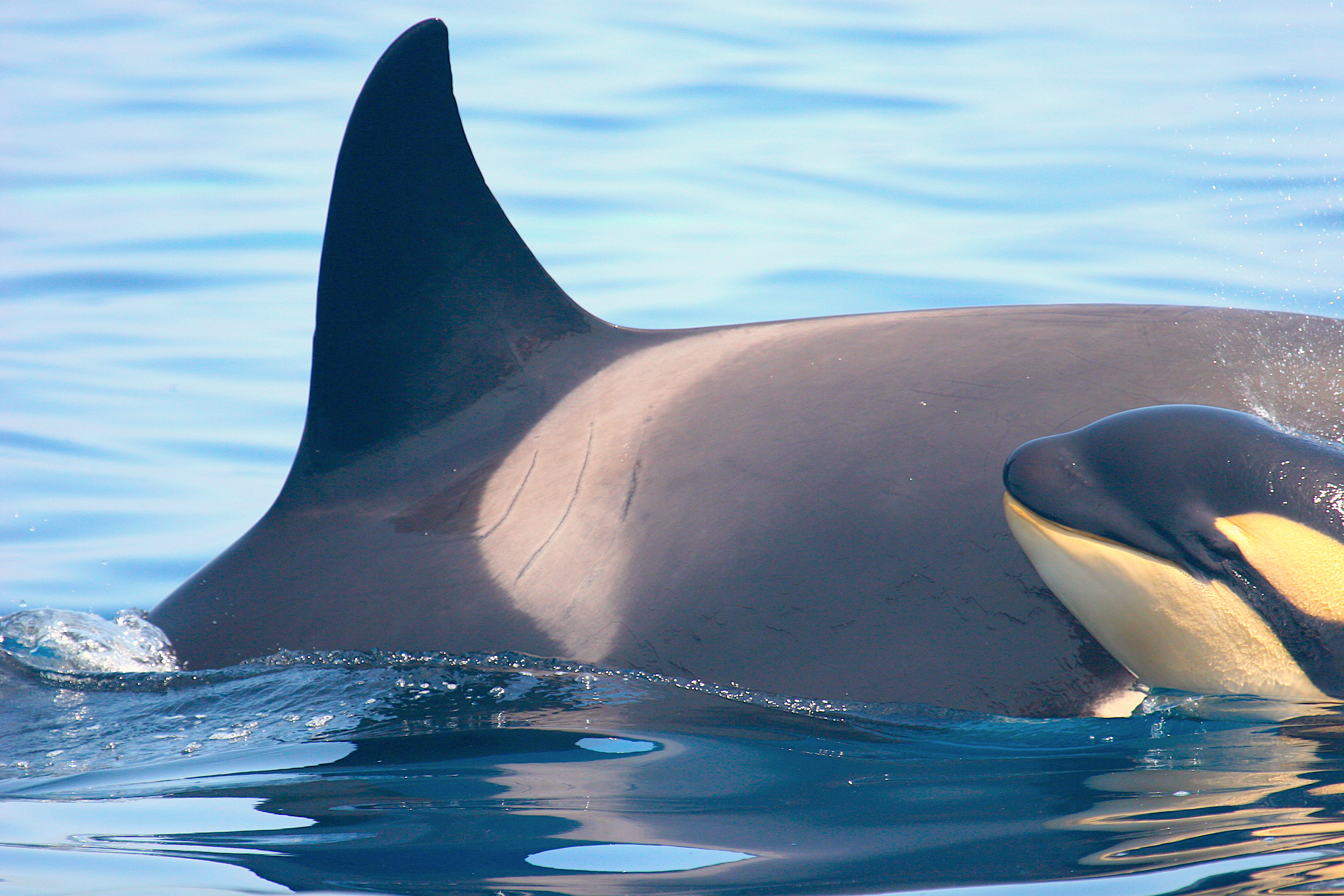
Orcas are social learners, passing knowledge such as hunting techniques horizontally, to peers, and vertically, from mother to offspring.

An article in Marine Mammal Science published in 2022 suggested various possible motivations for the orca behaviour. The interactions may be playful, and a result of the marine mammals' natural curiosity. Researcher Deborah Giles said that orcas are "incredibly curious and playful animals and so this might be more of a play thing as opposed to an aggressive thing", with the goal of spinning yachts.

Gibraltar-based marine biologist Eric Shaw argued that the orcas were displaying protective behaviours and were intentionally targeting the rudder with the understanding that it would immobilize the vessel, just as attacking the tail of a prey animal would immobilize it, a documented predation behaviour. The behaviour could also be the result of a combination of factors including disturbances created by vessels, depletion of the orcas' prey and interaction with fisheries.

A third possibility is that the behaviour was triggered by a "punctual aversive incident", such as one of the orcas colliding with a vessel and sustaining injuries.

Researchers have also suggested that the behaviour could be a cultural fad. Other cases of possible socially diffused phenomena among orcas have been documented, such as orcas of certain pods engaging in the display of dead salmon on their heads, first observed in 1987 and again in 2024, among southern resident orcas and Puget Sound orcas respectively.

CIRCE Conservación Information and Research coordinator Renaud de Stephanis suggested that the orcas break the rudder out of frustration, preferring the sensation of the propeller when a sailboat is running its engine.

Further work by Leila Moore suggests reasons why the area's undersea geography causes auditory amplifications of boat noise peculiarly linked to orca sensitivities.

Regardless of the orcas' motivation, sinking boats is likely not their goal, as most vessels survive the attacks. A researcher said that orcas could have sunk 600 boats if they wished. Humans are also not targets; no person has ever been killed by a wild orca.

== Human response ==
The rate of orca-boat interactions and their dispersal prompted the formation in August 2020 of a working group for the issue, the Atlantic Orca Working Group (Grupo de Trabajo Orca Atlántica; GTOA). A Facebook group, Orca Attack Reports, was created to facilitate the sharing of information about the interactions.

Radio warnings have been issued alerting vessels to the orcas' presence and suggesting keeping a distance. In 2020 and 2021, authorities from the Spanish Maritime Traffic Security briefly prohibited sailing vessels under 15 metres from navigation along the coast where interactions had occurred.

The development and testing of acoustic deterrents to dissuade the orcas was announced by the Portuguese National Association of Cruise Ships (Associação Nacional de Cruzeiros) in 2023.

Media outlets have sensationalised the incidents, often providing anthropomorphic rationales for the orca behaviour. Many have attributed the incidents to being revenge for some kind of wrong inflicted on one of the orcas, usually White Gladis. Social media reactions have included the generation of memes related to an "orca-uprising" or "orca wars", with some observers calling the behaviour "an act of anti-capitalist solidarity from 'orca comrades' and 'orca saboteurs'".

In 2023, the Spanish government planned to satellite tag six orcas involved in these attacks, in order to track their movements and minimize further interactions.

In August 2026 an orca matriarch named "Toñi" was spotted in the Strait of Gibraltar with several impact marks on its dorsal fin, consistent with entry holes caused by gunfire. Spanish authorities launched an investigation.

== See also ==
- Killer whales of Eden, New South Wales
- Orca attacks, a list of attacks by captive orcas
- Ultrasonic antifouling
