= Salmon hat =

Cultural fad displayed by orcas

A salmon hat is a theorized cultural fad observed in orcas in which multiple members of a pod will wear dead salmon upon their heads. It was first observed in 1987 with southern resident orcas, diffusing to multiple pods and was a relatively short-lived phenomenon. In 2024, the behaviour was observed again with orcas in Puget Sound. The motivations for salmon hats are unclear, but other orcas will mimic the behaviour once it begins. One hypothesis is that orcas wear salmon hats to display high food availability, or that the same individuals that originally started the trend revitalized it. It may also indicate playfulness.

== See also ==
- Iberian orca attacks
