= Mutsure Island =

Island near Shimonoseki, Japan

Mutsure Island (Japanese: 六連島) is an island due west of Shimonoseki in the Sea of Japan.

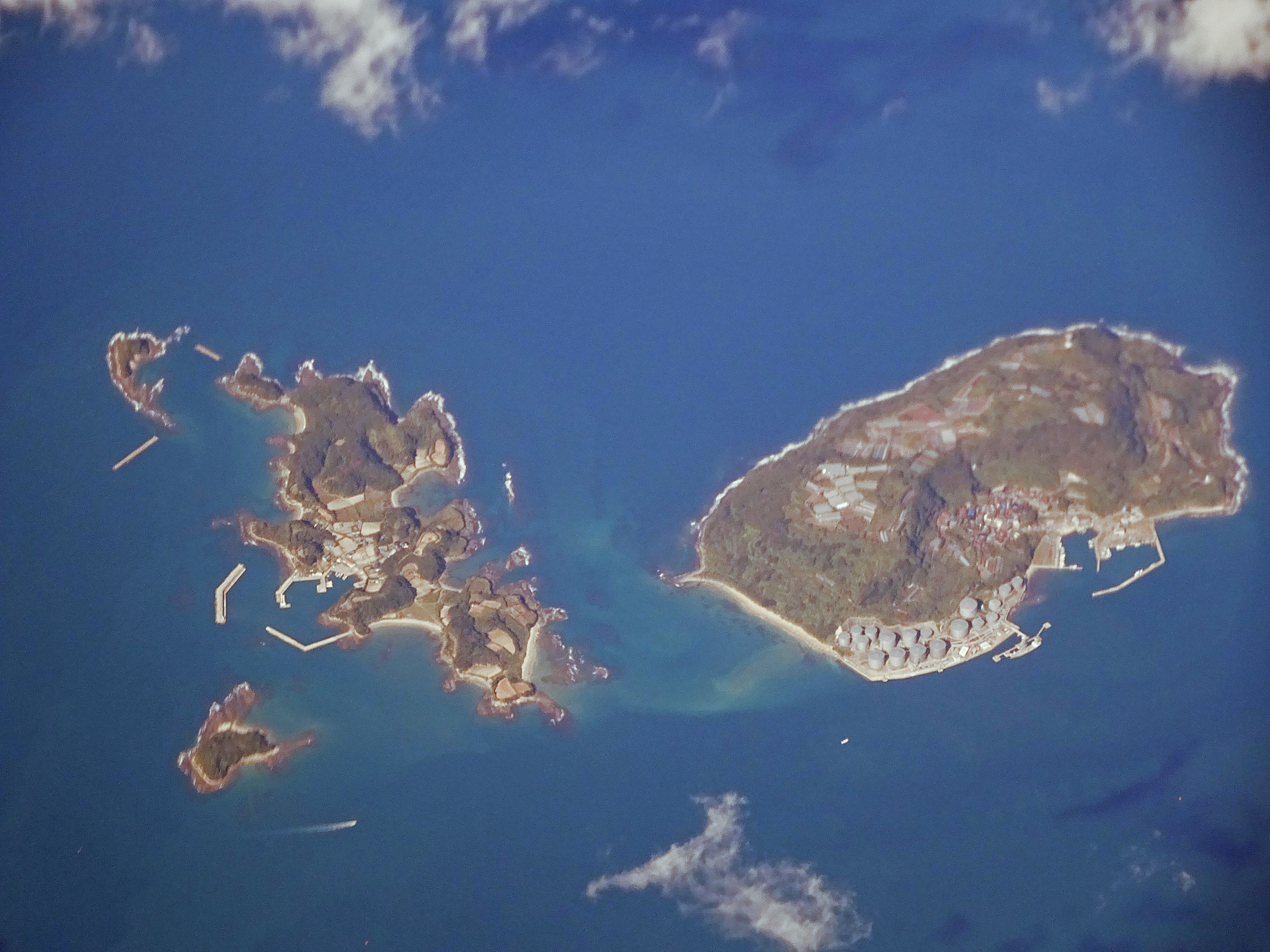
Matsure Island (right)

On March 20, 2024, nine people were killed when a South Korean-registered tanker Keoyoung Sun laden with 980 tons of acrylic acid capsized off the island.
