= Daedalus Reef =

Reef in the Egyptian Red Sea

Daedalus Reef Lighthouse Abū el-Kizân
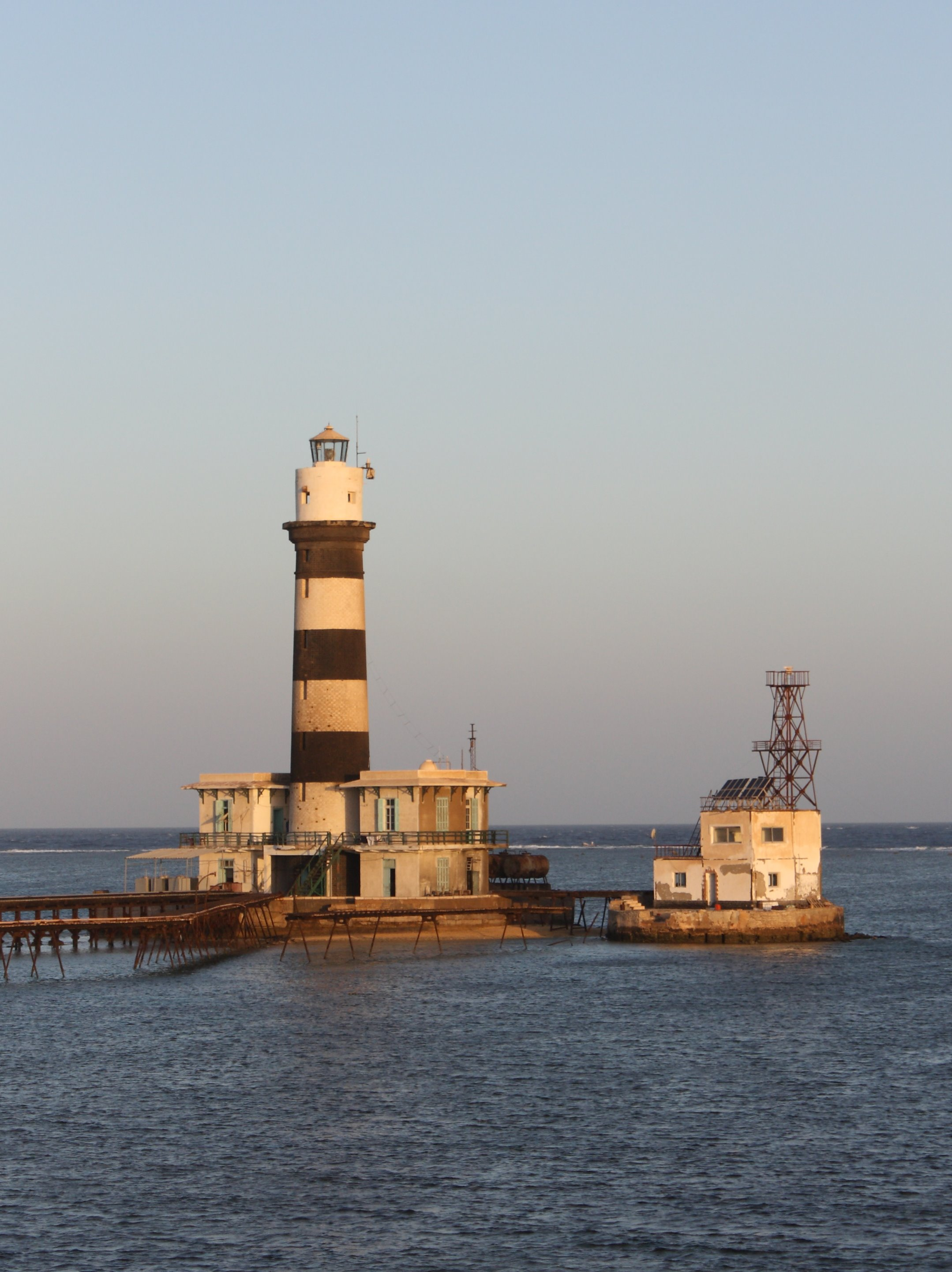
- Daedalus Reef Lighthouse in 2009
- Location: Marsa Alam, Red Sea, Egypt
- Coordinates: 24°55′24″N 35°51′30″E

Tower
- Constructed: 1863
- Construction: Stone tower
- Height: 30 feet (9.1 m)
- Shape: Cylindrical tower with balcony and lantern rising from a 2-story building
- Markings: Tower painted in white and black horizontal bands

Light
- First lit: 1931
- Focal height: 30 feet (9.1 m)
- Range: 15 nautical miles (28 km; 17 mi)
- Characteristic: Three white flashes every 12 s.

Daedalus Reef (Arabic: أبو قيزان, romanized: Abu Kizan) is an isolated oceanic coral reef in the Egyptian Red Sea, located approximately 90 kilometres (56 mi) east of Marsa Alam and about 100 kilometres (62 mi) south-east of Hurghada, at coordinates 24°55′24″N 35°51′30″E. The reef rises from a water depth of approximately 550 metres (1,800 ft) and its surface platform measures roughly 1,075 metres (3,527 ft) in length by 300 metres (984 ft) in width, bordered on all sides by near-vertical walls with dense coral growth. At its northern tip stands the operational Daedalus Reef Lighthouse, first constructed in 1863 and rebuilt in 1931.

The reef is part of Egypt's Red Sea marine protected area network, governed by a legal framework founded on Law No. 102 of 1983 and most recently reinforced by Prime Minister's Decree No. 4419 of 2025, which designated the entire Great Fringing Reef of the Red Sea as a marine protected area. Daedalus Reef is internationally recognised for its pelagic marine biodiversity and is considered one of the premier shark-observation sites in the Red Sea, with up to eight species documented through systematic underwater surveys.

== Geography, navigation and cartography ==
Daedalus Reef lies in the offshore Egyptian Red Sea, well beyond the continental coastline of the Red Sea Governorate, making it one of the most remote navigational landmarks in the southern Red Sea shipping lanes. Its oceanic isolation, combined with exposure to prevailing Red Sea currents, defines both its ecological character and its significance as a navigational hazard.

The reef is recorded in the official navigation registers of the United Kingdom Hydrographic Office (UKHO) under the identifier Admiralty D7296 (also referenced as D7296.1, formerly E6048), and in the United States National Geospatial-Intelligence Agency (NGA) register as NGA 30492. These designations constitute the canonical international references for the lighthouse marking the reef and are the identifiers used in the mandatory aids-to-navigation publications for professional seafarers.

The reef platform rises from a seabed at approximately 550 m (1,800 ft) depth. Its surface measures approximately 1,075 m × 300 m (3,527 ft × 984 ft), with edges that drop in sheer walls and steep slopes. The interaction between its bathymetry, open-ocean exposure and upwelling currents accounts for both its exceptional ecological productivity and its reputation among technical and recreational divers.

== Daedalus Reef Lighthouse ==
The Daedalus Reef Lighthouse — also known as Abu Kizan Lighthouse — is an active aid to navigation that has been in continuous operation since 1863. Its construction history reflects the strategic interest of nineteenth-century European powers in marking Red Sea routes in the context of the opening of the Suez Canal (1869).

=== Construction history ===
The original tower was erected in 1863 under British initiative and financing. It was a conical cast-iron structure approximately 18 metres (59 ft) tall, painted red, equipped with a jetty of approximately 100 metres (328 ft) to allow sea access. The original optic was a second-order fixed lens manufactured by the British firm Chance Brothers.

In 1931 the original tower was demolished and replaced by the current structure, built by the French company Barbier, Bénard et Turenne over a construction period of approximately one year and four months. The new stone tower was built on the original foundations and stands 30 metres (98 ft) tall. The reconstruction included a new jetty equipped with a railway track for materials transport. In 1993 the lighthouse underwent a maintenance and refurbishment programme.

=== Technical specifications ===
The active tower is cylindrical, built of stone masonry, with alternating white and black horizontal bands. It exhibits three white flashes every 12 seconds, with a nominal range of 15 nautical miles (28 km; 17 mi). Its current international identifiers are: ARLHS EGY-010, Admiralty D7296.1 (formerly E6048), and NGA 30492. The precise coordinates of the structure are 24.9328043347°N, 35.8702740112°E.

=== Management and administration ===
The lighthouse is operated by the Egyptian Authority for Maritime Safety (EAMS), the Egyptian government body responsible for aids to navigation in national waters. The EAMS is the institutional successor to the Ports and Lighthouses Administration, established in 1919, which had overseen Red Sea lighthouses since 1905. It was constituted as an independent authority by Presidential Decree No. 399 of 2004.

== Legal framework and environmental protection ==
The legal protection of Daedalus Reef is embedded in a successive series of Egyptian legislative instruments spanning from the 1980s to the present, constituting one of the most consolidated marine conservation frameworks in the Red Sea.

=== National legislation ===
The legal foundation for coral reef protection in Egypt is Law No. 102 of 1983 on natural reserves. The law defines natural reserves as land, coastal and inland water areas harbouring living organisms or natural phenomena of cultural, scientific or touristic value, a category that explicitly encompasses the coral reefs of the Red Sea and the Gulfs of Suez and Aqaba.

The law prohibits any activity harmful to the environment of the reserves, including hunting, fishing, destruction of corals and geological formations, introduction of alien matter, pollution of air, water or soil, and construction of any infrastructure without prior authorisation. Violations are punishable by fines of between EGP 500 and EGP 5,000 and imprisonment of up to one year, with higher penalties for repeat offences. The law also grants legally registered environmental associations standing to initiate proceedings before administrative and judicial bodies to enforce its provisions.

Implementation responsibility was delegated to the Prime Minister by Presidential Decree No. 479 of 1983, who established the Environmental Affairs Organ within the Council of Ministers (Order No. 1067 of 1983) as the executive body responsible for coordinating reserve management, maintaining species inventories and administering a dedicated conservation fund financed through visitor fees, fines and donations.

=== Protection decrees and international designations ===
Building on Law No. 102/1983, a succession of Council of Ministers decrees progressively strengthened protection of the Great Fringing Reef of the Red Sea. The complete regulatory chain comprises Decrees No. 102 (1983), No. 450 (1986), No. 143 (2003), No. 1618 (2006), and, most recently, Decree No. 4419 of 2025, signed by Prime Minister Mostafa Madbouly, which declared the Great Fringing Reef of the Red Sea — a reef system extending more than 2,000 kilometres (1,240 mi) — a fully designated marine protected area with official cartographic delimitation. Responsibility for implementing the decree was assigned to the governors of the Red Sea and South Sinai governorates.

At the international level, the reef system was designated a Hope Spot in 2022 by the Mission Blue / Sylvia Earle Alliance, a non-governmental organisation with consultative status at the United Nations. The designation was announced during COP27 in Sharm el-Sheikh by President Abdel Fattah el-Sisi. The Hope Spot champion is Professor Mahmoud Hanafy of Suez Canal University and chief scientist of HEPCA (Hurghada Environmental Protection and Conservation Association). The reef system has been identified by the international scientific programme 50 Reefs as among the coral reefs with the highest climate tolerance worldwide.

=== Diving regulations and use restrictions ===
As a marine protected area, the reef is subject to specific regulations on recreational use. Night diving and snorkelling are restricted in certain zones. All diving activities are conducted under the supervision of certified dive guides, and access is governed by marine park regulations. Scientific monitoring data from 2008 recorded an average of 105.74 divers and 6.11 vessels per dive survey, making Daedalus the highest-traffic site among those studied in the southern Red Sea.

== Biodiversity and pelagic fauna ==
Daedalus Reef is widely recognised in the scientific literature and the international diving community as one of the most significant aggregation sites for large pelagic species in the Red Sea. Its oceanographic conditions — oceanic isolation, immediately adjacent deep water, upwelling currents and prey abundance — favour the regular congregation of open-water shark species.

=== Documented elasmobranch species ===
A systematic study conducted between 2006 and 2010 through direct observation during recreational dives —comprising 27 dives, 31 hours of survey effort and 26 shark encounters at Daedalus— recorded a total of eight shark species at the reef:

  - Rhincodon typus (whale shark)
  - Alopias pelagicus (pelagic thresher shark)
  - Carcharhinus albimarginatus (silvertip shark)
  - Carcharhinus amblyrhynchos (grey reef shark)
  - Carcharhinus falciformis (silky shark)
  - Carcharhinus longimanus (oceanic whitetip shark)
  - Triaenodon obesus (whitetip reef shark)
  - Sphyrna lewini (scalloped hammerhead shark)

The encounter rate at Daedalus was 0.84 per dive hour and 2.35 individual sharks per dive hour, the highest rate recorded across all sites surveyed in the southern Red Sea during the study period.

=== Behaviour and interactions with divers ===
The same study documented specific behavioural patterns at Daedalus Reef. Scalloped hammerhead sharks (Sphyrna lewini) consistently retreated to deeper water in response to noise generated by divers. The oceanic whitetip shark (Carcharhinus longimanus) displayed persistent inquisitive behaviour and was recorded in at least two incidents of aggressive conduct towards divers: on 4 June 2008 and 17 September 2008, in both cases without serious injury.

=== Reef fish and other taxa ===
In addition to large pelagics, the reef supports a rich benthic and reef-associated community. Species regularly documented at the site include the humphead wrasse (Cheilinus undulatus), sea turtles, manta rays, great barracuda, tunas, groupers, giant moray eels, and a range of reef fish including anthias, surgeonfish, butterflyfish and angelfish. A notable feature of the southern platform is the formation known as Anemoni City, an approximately 15-metre (49 ft) expanse of sea anemones hosting associated clownfish colonies.

=== Regional conservation context ===
The Great Fringing Reef of the Red Sea, of which Daedalus forms part, harbours more than 1,200 fish species and over 300 coral species, many endemic to the Red Sea. The international scientific programme 50 Reefs has identified this reef system as among the most thermally resilient coral reef ecosystems globally, making it a conservation priority in the context of climate change.

== Diving ==
Daedalus Reef is accessible exclusively via liveaboard vessel departing from Hurghada or Marsa Alam, owing to its distance from shore. Access to the reef is regulated within the framework of the Red Sea marine park.

=== Underwater topography and dive sites ===
The reef offers three principal diving areas:

- Northern tip, east wall: exposed to upwelling currents, with the highest probability of pelagic encounters. The preferred area for oceanic whitetip and scalloped hammerhead sightings.
- Northern tip, west wall: similar profile to the east wall, with dense hard coral coverage. The remains of the original jetty, partially collapsed, rest on the seabed and are diveable.
- Southern plateau: the most sheltered zone, with lower current intensity. This area hosts the Anemoni City formation and greater reef fish diversity.

=== Diving conditions ===
Maximum recommended depth is 30–40 metres (98–131 ft). Visibility regularly exceeds 30 metres (98 ft). Currents can be strong and unpredictable, particularly at the northern tip, requiring advanced buoyancy and current-management skills. A minimum certification of PADI Advanced Open Water Diver (or equivalent) with at least 50 logged dives is recommended; a Nitrox specialty is advised to extend bottom time. Variable currents and full oceanic exposure classify Daedalus as an advanced to technical-level dive site.

=== Seasonal pelagic activity ===
Seasonal dynamics significantly influence species composition at the reef. The period from late summer through autumn (September–November) is associated with higher concentrations of oceanic whitetip sharks and pelagic thresher sharks, as well as more regular shallow-water sightings of scalloped hammerheads. Manta rays are more frequently recorded in winter and spring. Summer upwelling currents enhance planktonic productivity, sustaining the pelagic food chain that supports the reef's large predator assemblage.
