= Ultrasonic antifouling =

Uses high frequency sound to prevent or reduce biofouling on underwater structures

Ultrasonic antifouling is a technology that uses high frequency sound (ultrasound) to prevent or reduce biofouling on underwater structures, surfaces, and media. Ultrasound is high-frequency sound above the range humans can hear, though other animals may be able to, and otherwise it has the same physical properties as human-audible sound. Ultrasonic antifouling has two primary forms: sub-cavitation intensity and cavitation intensity. Sub-cavitation methods create high frequency vibrations, whilst cavitation methods cause more destructive microscopic pressure changes. Both methods inhibit or prevent biofouling by algae and other single-celled organisms.

== Background ==
Ultrasound was discovered in 1794 when Italian physiologist and biologist Lazzarro Spallanzani discovered that bats navigate through the reflection of high-frequency sounds. Ultrasonic antifouling is believed to have been discovered by the US Navy in the 1950s: during sonar tests on submarines, it was said that the areas surrounding the sonar transducers had less fouling than the rest of the hull.

Antifouling (the removal of biofouling) has been attempted since ancient times, initially using wax, tar or asphalt. Copper and lead sheathings were later introduced by Phoenicians and Carthaginians. The Cutty Sark has one example of such copper sheathing, available to view in Greenwich, England.

== Theory ==
=== Ultrasound ===
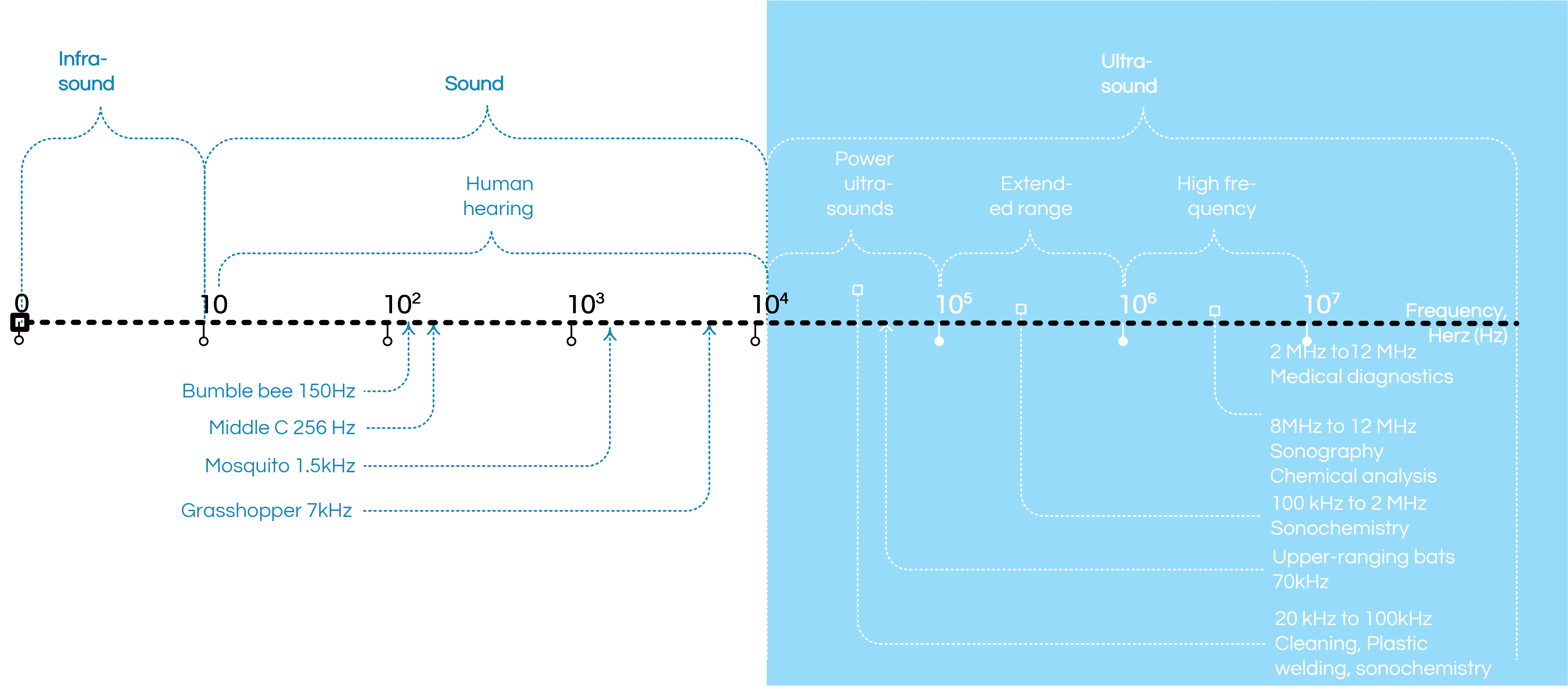
Range of sound frequencies including audible and inaudible sound

Ultrasound (ultrasonic) is sound at a frequency high enough that humans can not hear it. Sound has a frequency (low to high) and an intensity (quiet to loud).

Ultrasound is used to clean jewellery, weld rubber, treat abscesses, and perform sonography. These applications rely on the interaction of sound with the media through which the sound travels. In maritime applications, ultrasound is the key ingredient in some sonars; sonar relies on sound at frequencies ranging from infrasonic (below human hearing range) to ultrasonic.

=== Biofilm ===
The three main stages of biofouling are formation of a conditioning biofilm, microfouling, and macrofouling. A biofilm is the accretion of single-celled organisms onto a surface. This creates a habitat that enables other organisms to establish themselves. The conditioning film collects living and dead bacteria, creating the so-called primary film.

=== Ultrasonic antifouling ===
The two approaches to ultrasonic antifouling are cavitation and sub-cavitation.

Cavitation: Ultrasound of high enough intensity causes water to boil, creating cavitation. This physically annihilates living organisms and the supporting biofilm. One concern with it is the potential effect on the hull. Cavitation can be predicted mathematically through the calculation of acoustic pressure. Where this pressure is low enough, the liquid can reach its vaporisation pressure, resulting in localised vaporisation and forming small bubbles; these collapse quickly and with tremendous energy and turbulence, generating heat on the order of 5,000 K (4,730 °C; 8,540 °F) and pressures of the order of several atmospheres. Such systems are more appropriate where power consumption is not a factor, and the surfaces to be protected can tolerate the forces involved.

Sub-cavitation: The sound vibrates the surface(s) (e.g., hull, sea chests, water coolers) to which the transducer is attached. The vibrations prevent the cyprid stage of the biofouling species from attaching themselves permanently to the substrate by disrupting the Van Der Waals Force that allow their microvilli to hold themselves to the surface.

Different frequencies and intensities (or power) of ultrasonic waves have varying effects on different kinds of marine life, such as barnacles, mussels and algae.

== Components ==
The two main components of an ultrasonic antifouling system are:

- Transducer: The speaker or transducer takes an electrical signal and vibrates the medium in which it is located at the frequencies in the signal. The transducer is in direct contact with the hull or other surfaces, causing them to propagate the sound. Hull materials such as concrete and wood do not provide good antifouling since they contain many voids that dissipate/absorb the sound.
- Control Unit: The sound source and amplifier that provides the signals and power to each transducer. A single control box might control multiple transducers with either the same signal or varied signals.

== Applications ==
Commercial systems are available in a wide range of energies and configurations. All use ceramic piezoelectric transducers as the sound source. Dedicated systems support

- Ship hull protection (to prevent fouling, increase speed and reduce fuel costs)
- Heat exchanger protection (to extend operational cycles between cleaning)
- Water intakes (to prevent blockages)
- Fuel tanks (to prevent diesel contamination)
- Offshore structures (such as wind farms, oil and gas installations etc.)
- HVAC Cooling Towers to reduce or eliminate chemical dosing treatments

=== Algae control ===
Ultrasonic algae control is a commercial technology that has been claimed to control the blooming of cyanobacteria, algae, and biofouling in lakes and reservoirs, by using pulsed ultrasound. The duration of such treatment is supposed to take up to several months, depending on the water volume and algae species. Despite the experimental demonstration of certain bioeffects in small samples under controlled laboratory and sonication conditions, there is as yet no scientific foundation for outdoor ultrasonic algae control.

It has been speculated that ultrasound produced at the resonance frequencies of cells or their membranes may cause them to rupture. The center frequencies of the ultrasound pulses used in academic studies lie between 20 kHz and 2.5 MHz. The acoustic powers, pressures, and intensities applied vary from low, not affecting humans, to high, unsafe for swimmers.

According to research at the University of Hull, ultrasound-assisted gas release from blue-green algae cells may take place from nitrogen-containing cells, but only under very specific short-distance conditions which are not representative for intended outdoors applications. In addition, a study by Wageningen University on several algae species concluded that most claims on outdoors ultrasonic algae control are unsubstantiated.

== Limitations ==
=== Surface cleaning ===
Ultrasonic antifouling systems are generally capable of only maintaining a clean surface. They can't clean a surface that already has a well-established and mature biofouling infestation. To this end, they are a preventive measure, with the goal of an ultrasonic antifouling system being to maintain the protected surface as close to its optimum clean state as possible.

=== Hull materials ===
Ultrasonic systems are ineffective on wooden-hulled vessels or vessels made from ferro-cement, as these materials dampen the vibrations from the transducers. Composite hulls with a sandwich construction may also require modification to form monolithic plinths of solid material at each transducer location.
