= Keoyoung Sun =

1996–2024 South Korean tanker

History

South Korea
- Name: Sanno Maru (1996–2005); Keoyoung Yun (2005–2018); Nan Lian 11 (2018); Keoyoung Sun (2018–2024)
- Owner: Keoyoung Shipping (2005–2024)
- Port of registry: Jeju-si
- Builder: Sasaki Shipbuilding, Osakikamijima, Japan
- Laid down: 1995
- Completed: June 1996
- In service: 1996
- Out of service: 2024
- Identification: IMO 9146924
- Fate: Capsized March 20, 2024

General characteristics
- Type: Chemical tanker
- Tonnage: 870 GT
- Length: 225.8 ft (68.8 m)
- Beam: 35.5 ft (10.8 m)
- Draught: 14.4 ft (4.4 m)
- Installed power: 1,600 hp (1,200 kW)
- Propulsion: Single fixed pitch propeller
- Speed: 12.3 knots (22.8 km/h; 14.2 mph)
- Crew: 11 at time of sinking

Keoyoung Sun (Korean: 거영 선) was a South Korean tanker built in 1996, which sank in 2024.

== General career ==
Built in June 1996 as a chemical and oil tanker, she was originally named Sanno Maru for Japanese owners. Later, she was sold to Keoyoung Shipping Company, and being renamed Keoyoung Yun in March 2005. She maintained this name for the longest throughout her career, but was renamed to Nan Liam 11 in 2018. was quickly renamed to Keoyoung Sun, which she would have for the remainder of her career.

The vessel was measured at 870 gross tonnage (GT), with an overall length of 68.82 metres (225 ft 9 in), a length between perpendiculars of 64.0 m (210 ft 0 in) and a beam of 10.82 m (35 ft 6 in). She had ten chemical tanks on board, and a liquid cargo capacity of 1,357.

She was powered by a single diesel engine, built by Akasaka. The engine was rated as producing a power of 1,177 kW (1,578 hp). This turned her single fixed-pitch propeller and gave a top speed of 12.3 knots (22.8 km/h; 14.2 mph).

== Sinking ==
Keoyoung Sun departed on March 18, and was bound for Busan New Port. She was due to arrive on March 20.

At 7:00 am local time on March 20 (10PM GMT March 19), the Keoyoung Sun's crew had sent a distress signal, after the ship was in trouble during a storm. Soon after, the ship capsized with Initially eight of the crew reported as dead, two missing and one rescued. The death toll was later revised to ten of the eleven crew.
