= Gregory D. Johnsen =

American scholar (born 1978–1979)

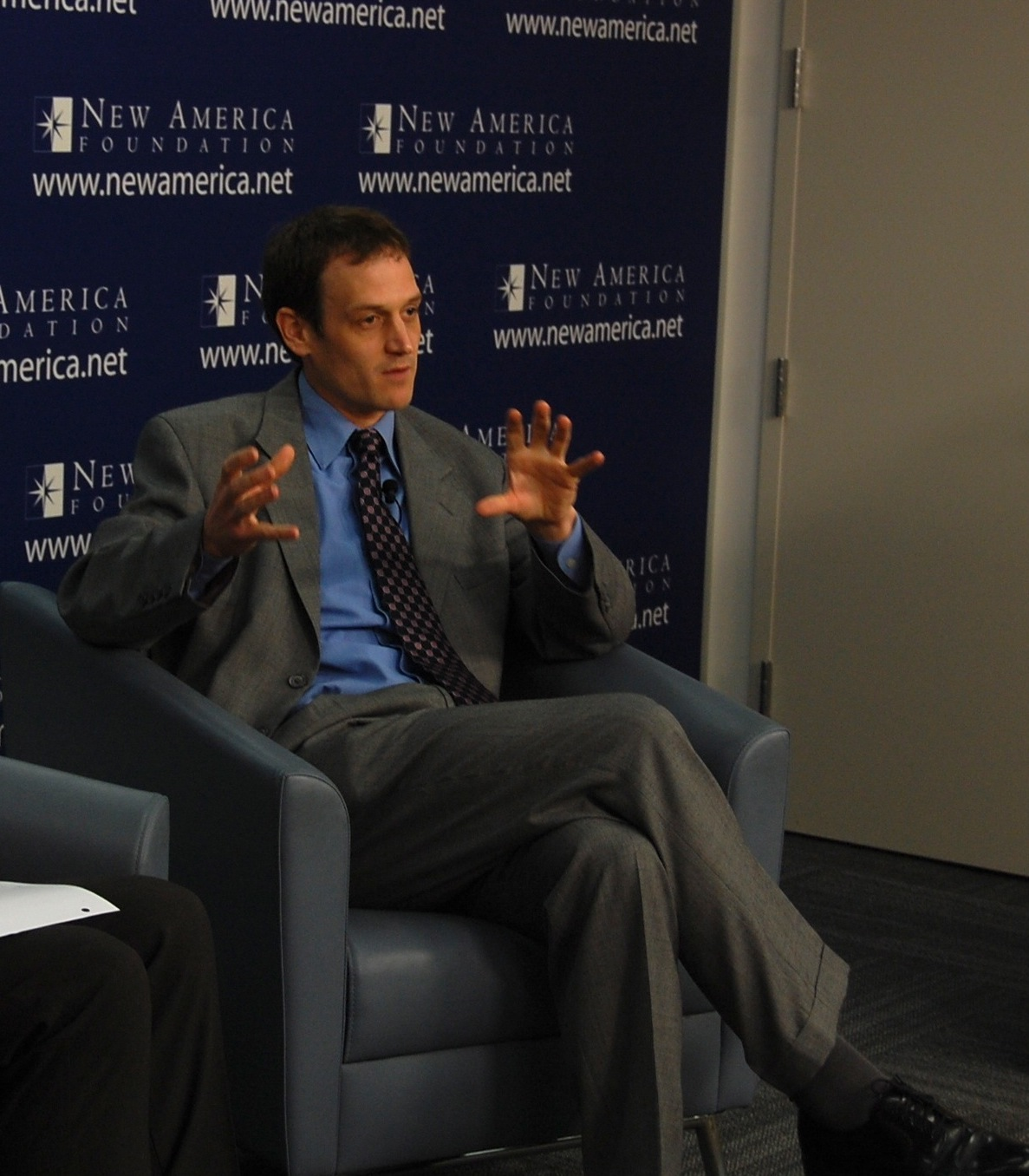
- Johnsen in 2012
- Born: 1978 or 1979 (age 46–47); Kearney, Nebraska, United States

Academic background
- Education: Hastings College (BA); University of Arizona (MA); Princeton University (Ph.D.)
- Thesis: A Century of Upheaval: The fall of the Imāmate and the Rise of the Ḥūthīs in Yemen, 1904–2014 (2017)
- Doctoral advisor: Bernard Haykel

Academic work
- Discipline: Near Eastern Studies
- Institutions: American Institute for Yemeni Studies; Center for Middle East Policy; Arabia Foundation; Sana'a Center for Strategic Studies; The Arab Gulf States Institute; Institute for Future Conflict
- Main interests: Yemen
- Notable works: The Last Refuge: Yemen, al-Qaeda, and America's War in Arabia

Gregory Dean Johnsen (born 1978–1979) is an American historian, journalist, and political analyst. A postgraduate of Princeton University, he is a leading expert on Yemen as well as al-Qaeda in the Arabian Peninsula (AQAP). He is currently an associate director United States Air Force Academy's Institute for Future Conflict and a non-resident fellow at The Arab Gulf States Institute.

== Early life and education ==
Johnson was born in 1978 or 1979 (Note: He was 24 years old by 2003, when he first visited Yemen.) in Kearney, Nebraska, and was raised in Guilford, New York. He recalled his interest in academia originating from his mother reading bedtime stories to him as a child. He also developed an interest in the desert from reading The Black Stallion series.

While attending Hastings College, an injury during a soccer tournament prior to his sophomore year led Johnsen to further focus on his education. He said the course "The Greek and Roman World" taught by Robert Babcock was greatly influential to him and spurred his interest in history. In his junior year, Johnsen made his first visit to the Middle East to study at the American University of Cairo. He graduated in 2001 with a bachelor's degree in history.

After serving with the Peace Corps in Jordan from 2001 to 2002, as part of the Fulbright Program he travelled to Yemen for research purposes from 2003 to 2004. He won a David R. Schweisberg Memorial Scholarship from the Overseas Press Club in 2006 while studying at the University of Arizona through an essay on presidential politics in Yemen, and later graduated with a master's degree in Near Eastern Studies. He then attended Princeton University, but delayed his Ph.D. dissertation and kept travelling to Yemen for other matters. He obtained a Ph.D. in Near Eastern Studies with his 2017 dissertation focused on the North Yemen civil war: "A Century of Upheaval: The fall of the Imāmate and the Rise of the Ḥūthīs in Yemen, 1904–2014.", which was advised by Bernard Haykel.

== Career ==
Several sources have characterized Johnsen as a leading expert on the subject matter of Yemen. He has been called an "all-things-Yemen-expert", with Glenn Greenwald of Salon.com praising his "objective, expert-level factual analysis". Johnsen was first drawn to studying Yemen from the North Yemen civil war, likening research to "reading a contemporary Arabic version of George R.R. Martin's Game of Thrones stories". He viewed Yemen favourably compared to the other nations he had visited, noting its "wild, intoxicating charm" and its contested politics in the form of tribal dynamics. He has travelled to and lived in the country on numerous occasions, most recently in March 2014, and has credited "his extensive network of friends for his intimate knowledge of the country's people and culture." He is regarded as a preeminent expert on the al-Qaeda presence in Yemen, specifically al-Qaeda in the Arabian Peninsula (AQAP).

The governments of the United States and the United Kingdom have been advised by Johnsen on issues concerning Yemen. He led a group of post-secondary students on a visit to Yemen in 2006 as part of a Department of State program, was a member of the USAID conflict assessment team for Yemen in 2009, and has testified before Congress and in federal courts on matters concerning Yemen. He was also the lead writer for the Syria Study Group, a project commissioned by the United States Institute of Peace in 2019.

From 2016 to 2018, the United Nations Security Council employed Johnsen on its Panel of Experts on Yemen, responsible for managing sanctions related to the Yemeni civil war. In March 2018, after the US had blocked the nomination of a Russian expert on the panel on Sudan, Russia in turn blocked Johnsen's re-nomination for his own panel. A Russian diplomat later told him the withholding was due to "great power politics" between the US and Russia.

Several organizations have received advice and consultancy services from Johnsen. Institutions where he has held fellowships include the American Institute for Yemeni Studies, the Center for Middle East Policy of the Brookings Institution, and the Sana'a Center for Strategic Studies, where he was the editor of the Yemen Review as a non-resident fellow, and the Arabia Foundation. He joined The Arab Gulf States Institute as a non-resident fellow in 2022, and the Institute for Future Conflict at the US Air Force Academy as an associate director in 2023. He remains with both institutions as of 2025.

== Publications ==
Alongside Brian O'Neill, Johnsen co-founded the blog Waq al-Waq, which Logos described as "a forum for analysis of developments" in Yemen. The blog covered history and current affairs in Yemen, and conflicts including the al-Qaeda insurgency, the Houthi insurgency, and the Southern Movement. The blog is "well known in national security circles" according to Rachel Martin, with the Center for a New American Security regarding it as "required reading for anyone serious about Yemen". His 2012 book The Last Refuge: Yemen, al-Qaeda, and America's War in Arabia covers the history of al-Qaeda's presence.

As a journalist, Johnsen has written extensively on the al-Qaeda insurgency in Yemen among other topics. Publications he has written for include The New York Times, The Atlantic, Foreign Policy, Newsweek, The American Interest, The Boston Globe, The Christian Science Monitor, and West Point's CTC Sentinel. He has given hundreds of interviews to national and international media concerning Yemen, and has appeared on news channels such as CNN, PBS News Hour, The Charlie Rose Show, BBC, NPR, Al Jazeera English and Alhurra. BuzzFeed News selected Johnsen as their inaugural Michael Hastings National Security Reporting Fellow for 2013 to 2014, where he wrote on US national security matters and their impacts. He continued writing for BuzzFeed News until 2018.
