= Houthis =

Shia Islamist organization in Yemen

Ansar Allah أَنْصَار اللَّٰه
- The Sarkha is the slogan and emblem of the Houthis, translated as, "God is Great, Death to America, Death to Israel, Curse the Jews, Victory to Islam."
- Leader: Abdul-Malik al-Houthi (since 2004); Hussein al-Houthi † (1994–2004)
- Spokesman: Mohammed Abdul Salam
- Founder: Hussein al-Houthi
- Founded: 1994; 32 years ago
- Headquarters: Saada (1994–2014); Sanaa (since 2014)
- Membership: 350,000 (2024)
- Ideology: Khomeinism; Shia Islamism; Jihadism (Shia); Pan-Islamism; Anti-imperialism; Anti-Zionism; Arab nationalism; Pan-Arabism; Yemeni nationalism; Zaydi revivalism; Populism
- Religion: Shia Islam (Zaydi) (Note: The Houthis have been accused, even by a number of fellow Zaydis, of secretly being converts or followers of the Twelver branch, which is the official religion of Iran. However, this claim is tied to efforts by the Saleh regime and subsequent Yemeni governments to portray the Houthis as a force directly controlled by Iran, and is not backed up by evidence.)
- International affiliation: Axis of Resistance (informal)
- Designated as terror group by: Designators Yemen (Presidential Leadership Council): Saudi Arabia; United Arab Emirates; United States; Australia; Bahrain; Canada; Costa Rica; Israel; Malaysia; New Zealand; Saudi Arabia; Ukraine; United Arab Emirates

Website
- ansarollah.com.ye/en/

The Houthis, (Note: /ˈhuːθiːz/; Arabic: الْحُوثِيّوُن, romanized: al-Ḥūthiyūn, ar) officially known as Ansar Allah or Ansarullah, (Note: Arabic: أَنْصَار اللَّٰه, romanized: ʾAnṣār Allāh, lit. 'Partisans of God', pronounced [ʔansˤaːr ɑɫˈɫɑh]) are a Zaydi revivalist and Shia Islamist political and paramilitary organization that emerged from Yemen in the 1990s. It is predominantly made up of Zaydis, whose namesake leadership is drawn largely from the al-Houthi family. The Houthis are backed by Iran, and they are widely considered part of the Iranian-led Axis of Resistance. The group has been a central player in Yemen's civil war, drawing widespread international condemnation for its human rights abuses, including targeting civilians and using child soldiers. The movement is designated as a terrorist organization by some countries.

Under the leadership of Zaydi religious leader Hussein al-Houthi, the Houthis emerged as an opposition movement to Yemeni president Ali Abdullah Saleh, whom they accused of corruption and being backed by Saudi Arabia and the United States. In 2003, influenced by the Lebanese Shia political and military organization Hezbollah, the Houthis adopted their official slogan against the United States, Israel, and the Jewish people. Al-Houthi resisted Saleh's order for his arrest, and he was killed by the Yemeni military in Saada in 2004. His death sparked the Houthi insurgency. Since then, the movement has been mostly led by his brother Abdul-Malik al-Houthi.

The organization played a role in the Yemeni Revolution of 2011 by participating in street protests and coordinating with other Yemeni opposition groups. They joined Yemen's National Dialogue Conference but later rejected the 2011 reconciliation deal. In late 2014, the Houthis repaired their relationship with Saleh, and with his help they took control of the capital city. The takeover prompted a Saudi-led military intervention to restore the internationally recognized government, leading to an ongoing civil war which included missile and drone attacks against Saudi Arabia and its ally the United Arab Emirates. Following the outbreak of the Gaza war, the Houthis began to fire missiles at Israel and to attack ships off Yemen's coast in the Red Sea, which they say is in solidarity with the Palestinians and aims to facilitate the entry of humanitarian aid into the Gaza Strip.

The Houthi movement attracts followers in Yemen by portraying themselves as fighting for economic development and the end of the political marginalization of Zaydi Shias, as well as by promoting regional political–religious issues in its media. The Houthis have a complex relationship with Yemen's Sunnis; the movement has discriminated against Sunnis but has also allied with and recruited them. The Houthis aim to govern all of Yemen and support external movements against the United States, Israel, and Saudi Arabia. Because of the Houthis' ideological background, the conflict in Yemen is widely seen as a front of the Iran–Saudi Arabia proxy war.

== History ==
According to Ahmed Addaghashi, a professor at Sanaa University, the Houthis began as a moderate theological movement that preached tolerance and held a broad-minded view of all the Yemeni peoples. Their first organization, "the Believing Youth" (BY), was founded in 1992 in Saada Governorate by either Mohammed al-Houthi, or his brother Hussein al-Houthi.

The Believing Youth established school clubs and summer camps in order to "promote a Zaydi revival" in Saada. By 1994–95, between 15,000 and 20,000 students had attended BY summer camps. The religious material included lectures by Mohammed Hussein Fadhlallah (a Lebanese Shia scholar) and Hassan Nasrallah (Secretary General of Hezbollah).

The formation of the Houthi organisations has been described by Adam Baron of the European Council on Foreign Relations as a reaction to foreign intervention. Their views include shoring up Zaydi support against the perceived threat of Saudi-influenced ideologies in Yemen and a general condemnation of the former Yemeni government's alliance with the United States, which, along with complaints regarding the government's corruption and the marginalisation of much of the Houthis' home areas in Saada, constituted the group's key grievances.

Although Hussein al-Houthi, who was killed in 2004, had no official relation with Believing Youth (BY), according to Zaid, he contributed to the radicalisation of some Zaydis after the 2003 invasion of Iraq. BY-affiliated youth adopted anti-American and anti-Israel slogans, which they chanted in the Al Saleh Mosque in Sanaa after Friday prayers. According to Zaid, the followers of Houthi's insistence on chanting the slogans attracted the authorities' attention, further increasing government worries over the extent of the Houthi movement's influence. "The security authorities thought that if today the Houthis chanted 'Death to America', tomorrow they could be chanting 'Death to the president [of Yemen]'".

In 2004, 800 BY supporters were arrested in Sanaa. President Ali Abdullah Saleh then invited Hussein al-Houthi to a meeting in Sanaa, but Hussein declined. On 18 June, Saleh sent government forces to arrest Hussein. Hussein responded by launching an insurgency against the central government but was killed on 10 September. The insurgency continued intermittently until a ceasefire agreement was reached in 2010. During this prolonged conflict, the Yemeni army and air force were used to suppress the Houthi rebellion in northern Yemen. The Saudis joined these anti-Houthi campaigns, but the Houthis won against both Saleh and the Saudi army. According to the Brookings Institution, this particularly humiliated the Saudis, who spent tens of billions of dollars on their military.

The Houthis participated in the 2011 Yemeni Revolution, as well as the ensuing National Dialogue Conference (NDC). However, they rejected the provisions of the November 2011 Gulf Cooperation Council deal on the ground that "it divide[d] Yemen into poor and wealthy regions" and also in response to the assassination of their representative at NDC.

As the revolution went on, Houthis gained control of greater territory. By 9 November 2011, Houthis were said to be in control of two Yemeni governorates (Saada and Al Jawf) and close to taking over a third governorate (Hajjah), which would enable them to launch a direct assault on the Yemeni capital of Sanaa. In May 2012, it was reported that the Houthis controlled a majority of Saada, Al Jawf, and Hajjah governorates; they had also gained access to the Red Sea and started erecting barricades north of Sanaa in preparation for more conflict.

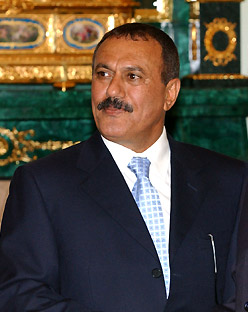
Yemen's former president Ali Abdullah Saleh was allied with Houthis from 2014 until his death in 2017. The Houthis assassinated him on charges of treason.

By September 2014, Houthis were said to control parts of the Yemeni capital, Sanaa, including government buildings and a radio station. While Houthi control expanded to the rest of Sanaa, as well as other towns such as Rada', this control was strongly challenged by Al-Qaeda. The Gulf States believed that the Houthis had accepted aid from Iran while Saudi Arabia was aiding their Yemeni rivals.

On 20 January 2015, Houthi rebels seized the presidential palace in the capital. President Abdrabbuh Mansur Hadi was in the presidential palace during the takeover but was not harmed. The movement officially took control of the Yemeni government on 6 February, dissolving parliament and declaring its Revolutionary Committee to be the acting authority in Yemen. On 20 March the al-Badr and al-Hashoosh mosques came under suicide attack during midday prayers, and the Islamic State quickly claimed responsibility. The blasts killed 142 Houthi worshippers and wounded more than 351, making it the deadliest terrorist attack in Yemen's history.

On 27 March 2015, in response to perceived Houthi threats to Sunni factions in the region, Saudi Arabia along with Bahrain, Qatar, Kuwait, UAE, Egypt, Jordan, Morocco, and Sudan led a gulf coalition airstrike in Yemen. The military coalition included the United States which helped in planning of airstrikes, as well as logistical and intelligence support. The US Navy has actively participated in the Saudi-led naval blockade of Houthi-controlled territory in Yemen, which humanitarian organizations argue has been the main contributing factor to the outbreak of famine in Yemen.

The four-month long Battle of Aden (2015) occurred between 25 March 2015 and 22 July.

According to a 2015 September report by Esquire magazine, the Houthis, once the outliers, are now one of the most stable and organised social and political movements in Yemen. The power vacuum created by Yemen's uncertain transitional period has drawn more supporters to the Houthis. Many of the formerly powerful parties, now disorganised with an unclear vision, have fallen out of favour with the public, making the Houthis—under their newly branded Ansar Allah name—all the more attractive.

Houthi spokesperson Mohamed Abdel Salam stated that his group had spotted messages between the UAE and Saleh three months before his death. He told Al-Jazeera that there was communication between Saleh, UAE and a number of other countries such as Russia and Jordan through encrypted messages. The alliance between Saleh and the Houthi broke down in late 2017, with armed clashes occurring in Sanaa from 28 November. Saleh declared the split in a televised statement on 2 December, calling on his supporters to take back the country, and expressed openness to a dialogue with the Saudi-led coalition. On 4 December 2017, Saleh's house in Sanaa was assaulted by fighters of the Houthi movement, according to residents. Saleh was killed by the Houthis on the same day.

In January 2021, the United States designated the Houthis a terrorist organization, creating fears of an aid shortage in Yemen, but this stance was reversed a month later after Joe Biden became president. On 17 January 2022, Houthi missile and drone attacks on UAE industrial targets set fuel trucks on fire and killed three foreign workers. This was the first specific attack to which the Houthi admitted, and the first to result in deaths. A response led by Saudi Arabia included a 21 January air strike on a detention centre in Yemen, resulting in at least 70 deaths.

Following the outbreak of the Gaza war, the Houthis began to fire missiles at Israel and to attack ships off Yemen's coast in the Red Sea, which they say is in solidarity with the Palestinians and aiming to facilitate entry of humanitarian aid into the Gaza Strip. On 31 October Houthi forces launched ballistic missiles at Israel, which were shot down by Israel's Arrow missile defense system. Israeli officials claimed that this was the first ever combat to occur in space. In order to end the attacks in the Red Sea, the Houthis demanded a ceasefire in Gaza and an end to Israel's blockade of the Gaza Strip. In January 2024, the United States and the United Kingdom conducted airstrikes against multiple Houthi targets in Yemen, and the United States designated the Houthi as a Specially Designated Global Terrorist.

In February 2026, the Houthis announced that they had resumed attacks on ships in response to the recent US and Israeli airstrikes on Iran.

On 28 March 2026 during the 2026 Iran war, a Houthi missile was launched from Yemen toward Beersheba in Southern Israel after its leader gave a speech. Hours later they confirmed launching a second missile.

== Ideology ==
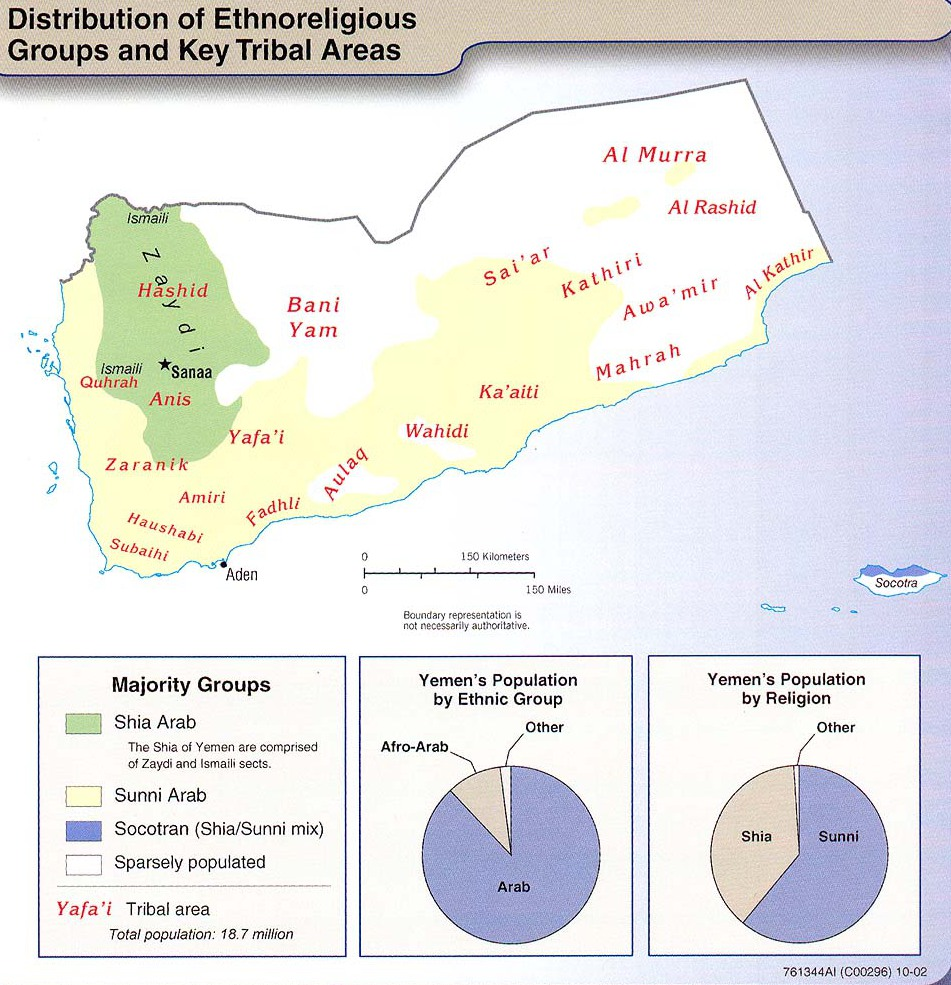
A map of Yemen's ethnoreligious groups, 2002

The Houthi movement follows a mixed ideology with religious, Yemeni nationalist, and big tent-populist elements, imitating Hezbollah. Outsiders have argued that the group's ideological tenets are often vague and self-contradictory and that many of its slogans do not accurately reflect its aims. According to American historian Bernard Haykel, the movement's founder, Hussein al-Houthi, was influenced by a variety of religious traditions and political ideologies, making it difficult to fit him or his followers into existing categories. The Houthis have portrayed themselves as a national resistance force, defending all Yemenis from outside aggression and influences, as champions against corruption, chaos, and extremism, and as representatives for the interests of marginalized tribal groups and the Zaydi sect.

Haykel argues that the Houthi movement has two central religious-ideological tenets. The first is the "Quranic Way", which encompasses the belief that the Quran does not allow for interpretation and contains everything needed to improve Muslim society. The second is the belief in the absolute, divine right of Ahl al-Bayt (the Prophet's descendants) to rule, a belief attributed to Jaroudism, a fundamentalist offshoot of Zaydism.

The group has also exploited the popular discontent over corruption and the reduction of government subsidies. According to a February 2015 Newsweek report, Houthis are fighting "for things that all Yemenis crave: government accountability, the end to corruption, regular utilities, fair fuel prices, job opportunities for ordinary Yemenis and the end of Western influence". In forming alliances, the Houthi movement has been at times opportunistic, partnering with countries it later declared as enemies, including the United States.

The influx of various individual and tribal interests has somewhat diluted the movement's original vision over time. Around the time of the third Saada war (November 2005–February 2006), the conflict was increasingly waged "along the lines of prevalent tribal feuds", which distorted the initial socio-economic, religious and ideological aims of Hussein al-Houthi.

=== Religion ===
In general, the Houthi movement has centered its belief system on the Zaydi branch of Islam, a sect almost exclusively present in Yemen. Zaydis form about 34% of the population, with Sunnis comprising about 65%. Zaydi-led governments ruled Yemen for a thousand years up until 1962. The Houthi movement has often advocated for Zaydi revivalism in Yemen since its foundation.

Although the group has framed its struggle in religious terms and put great importance on its Zaydi roots, the Houthis are not an exclusively Zaydi group. They have rejected their portrayal by others as a faction that is purportedly only interested in Zaydi-related issues. They have not publicly advocated for the restoration of the old Zaydi imamate, although analysts have argued that they might plan to restore it in the future. Most Yemenis have a low opinion of the old imamate, and Hussein al-Houthi also did not advocate the imamate's restoration. Instead, he proposed a "Guiding Eminence" (alam al-huda): an individual descended from the Prophet who would act as a "universal leader for the world". However, he never defined this position's prerogatives or how they should be appointed.

The movement has also recruited and allied with Sunni Muslims; according to researcher Ahmed Nagi, several themes of the Houthi ideology "such as Muslim unity, prophetic lineages, and opposition to corruption [...] allowed the Houthis to mobilize not only northern Zaydis, but also inhabitants of predominantly Shafi'i areas." However, the group is known to have discriminated against Sunni Muslims as well, closing Sunni mosques and primarily placing Zaydis in leadership positions in Houthi-controlled areas. The Houthis lost significant support among Sunni tribes after killing ex-President Saleh.

Many Zaydis also oppose the Houthis, regarding them as Iranian proxies and the Houthis' form of Zaydi revivalism as an attempt to "establish Shiite rule in the north of Yemen". In addition, Haykel argued that the Houthis follow "a highly politicised, revolutionary, and intentionally simplistic, even primitivist interpretation of [Zaydism]'s teachings". Their view of Islam is largely based on the teachings of Hussein al-Houthi, collected after his death in a book titled Malazim (Fascicles), a work treated by Houthis as more important than older Zaydi theological traditions, resulting in repeated disputes with established Zaydi religious leaders.

The Malazim reflects a number of different religious and ideological influences, including Khomeinism and revolutionary Sunni Islamist movements such as the Muslim Brotherhood. Hussein al-Houthi believed that the "last exemplary" Zaydi scholar and leader was Al-Hadi ila'l-Haqq Yahya; later Zaydi imams were regarded as having deviated from the original form of Islam. The Houthis' belief in the "Quranic Way" also includes the rejection of tafsir (Quranic interpretations) as being derivative and divisive, meaning that they have a low opinion of most existing Islamic theological and juridical schools, including Zaydi traditionalists based in Sanaa with whom they often clash.

The Houthis claim that their actions are to fight against the alleged expansion of Salafism in Yemen and for the defence of their community from discrimination. The position of Saudi-backed Salafis and other Sunni groups in Yemen had steadily increased throughout the Republican era, as did the position of Sheikhs who sometimes cooperated with these Salafi groups for pragmatic reasons. The Salafis, who enjoyed considerable support from the Saleh regime, reportedly pursued an aggressive "policy of provocation" towards the Zaydis who inhabited the surrounding area, often accusing them of apostasy. In the years before the rise of the Houthi movement, state-supported Salafis had harassed Zaydis and destroyed Zaydi sites (most notably cemeteries) in Yemen. After their rise to power in 2014, the Houthis consequently "crushed" the Salafi community in Saada Governorate and mostly eliminated the al-Qaeda presence in the areas under their control; the Houthis view al-Qaeda as "Salafi jihadists" and thus "mortal enemies". On the other side, between 2014 and 2019, the Houthi leadership have signed multiple co-existence agreements with the Salafi community; pursuing Shia-Salafi reconciliation. The Yemeni government has often accused the Houthis of collaborating with al-Qaeda to undermine its control of southern Yemen.

=== Governance ===
Territory controlled by the Houthi movement shown in green

In general, the Houthis' political ideology has gradually shifted from "heavily-religious mobilisation and activism under Husayn to the more assertive and statesmanlike rhetoric under Abdulmalik", its current leader. With strong support from Houthis from the predominantly Zaydi northern tribes, the Houthi movement has often been described as a tribalist or monarchist faction in opposition to republicanism. Regardless, they have managed to rally many people outside of their traditional bases to their cause and have become a major nationalist force.

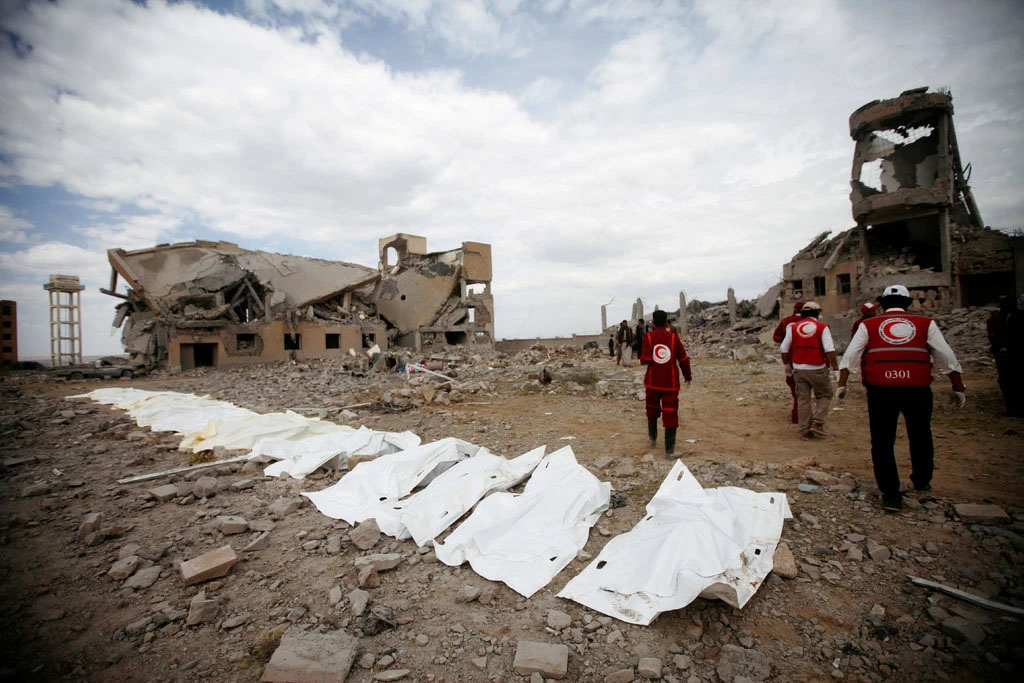
Victims of Saudi-led airstrikes on a university used as a detention center by the Houthis in Dhamar, 2 September 2019

When armed conflict for the first time erupted back in 2004 between the Yemeni government and Houthis, the President Ali Abdullah Saleh accused the Houthis and other Islamic opposition parties of trying to overthrow the government and the republican system. However, Houthi leaders, for their part, rejected the accusation by saying that they had never rejected the president or the republican system but were only defending themselves against government attacks on their community. After their takeover of northern Yemen in 2014, the Houthis remained committed to republicanism and continued to celebrate republican holidays. The Houthis have an ambivalent stance on the possible transformation of Yemen into a federation or the separation into two fully independent countries to solve the country's crisis. Though not opposed to these plans per se, they have declined any plans that would, in their eyes, marginalize the northern tribes politically.

Meanwhile, their opponents have asserted that the Houthis desire to institute Zaydi religious law, destabilising the government and stirring anti-American sentiment. In contrast, Hassan al-Homran, a former Houthi spokesperson, has said that "Ansar Allah supports the establishment of a civil state in Yemen. We want to build a striving modern democracy. Our goals are to fulfil our people's democratic aspirations in keeping with the Arab Spring movement." In an interview with Yemen Times, Hussein al-Bukhari, a Houthi insider, said that the Houthis' preferred political system is a republic with elections where women can also hold political positions, and that they do not seek to form a cleric-led government after the model of Islamic Republic of Iran, because "we cannot apply this system in Yemen because the followers of the Shafi (Sunni) doctrine are bigger in number than the Zaydis". In 2018, the Houthi leadership proposed the establishment of a non-partisan transitional government composed of technocrats.

Ali Akbar Velayati, International Affairs Advisor to Iranian Supreme Leader Ayatollah Ali Khamenei, stated in October 2014 that "We are hopeful that Ansar-Allah has the same role in Yemen as Hezbollah has in eradicating the terrorists in Lebanon". Mohammed al-Houthi criticized the Trump-brokered Abraham Accords between Israel and the United Arab Emirates as "betrayal" against the Palestinians and the cause of pan-Arabism.

=== Women's rights and freedom of expression ===
The Houthis' treatment of women and their restrictions on the arts have been a subject of debate. On one side, the movement has stated that it defends women's rights to vote and take public offices, and some feminists have fled from government-held areas into Houthi territories as the latter at least disempower more radical jihadists. The Houthis field their own women security force, as well as a Girl Scouts wing. However, it has also been reported that Houthis harass women and restrict their freedom of movement and expression.

In regards to culture, the Houthis try to spread their views through propaganda using mainstream media, social media, and poetry as well as the "Houthification" of the education system to "instil Huthi values and mobilise the youth to join the fight against the coalition forces". However, the Houthis have been inconsistent in regards how to deal with forms of artistic expression which they disapprove of. The movement has allowed radio stations to continue broadcasting music and content that the Houthis view as too Western, but also banned certain songs and harassed artists such as wedding musicians. In one instance, which generated much publicity, Houthi police officers stated that music could be played at a wedding party if loudspeakers did not broadcast it. The main wedding singer was arrested when the party guests did not conform to this demand. Journalist Robert F. Worth stated that "many secular-minded Yemenis seem unsure whether to view the Houthis as oppressors or potential allies." In general, the Houthis' policies are often decided on a local basis, and high-ranking Houthi officials are frequently incapable of checking regional officers' powers, making the treatment of civilians dependent on the area.

=== Slogan and controversies ===
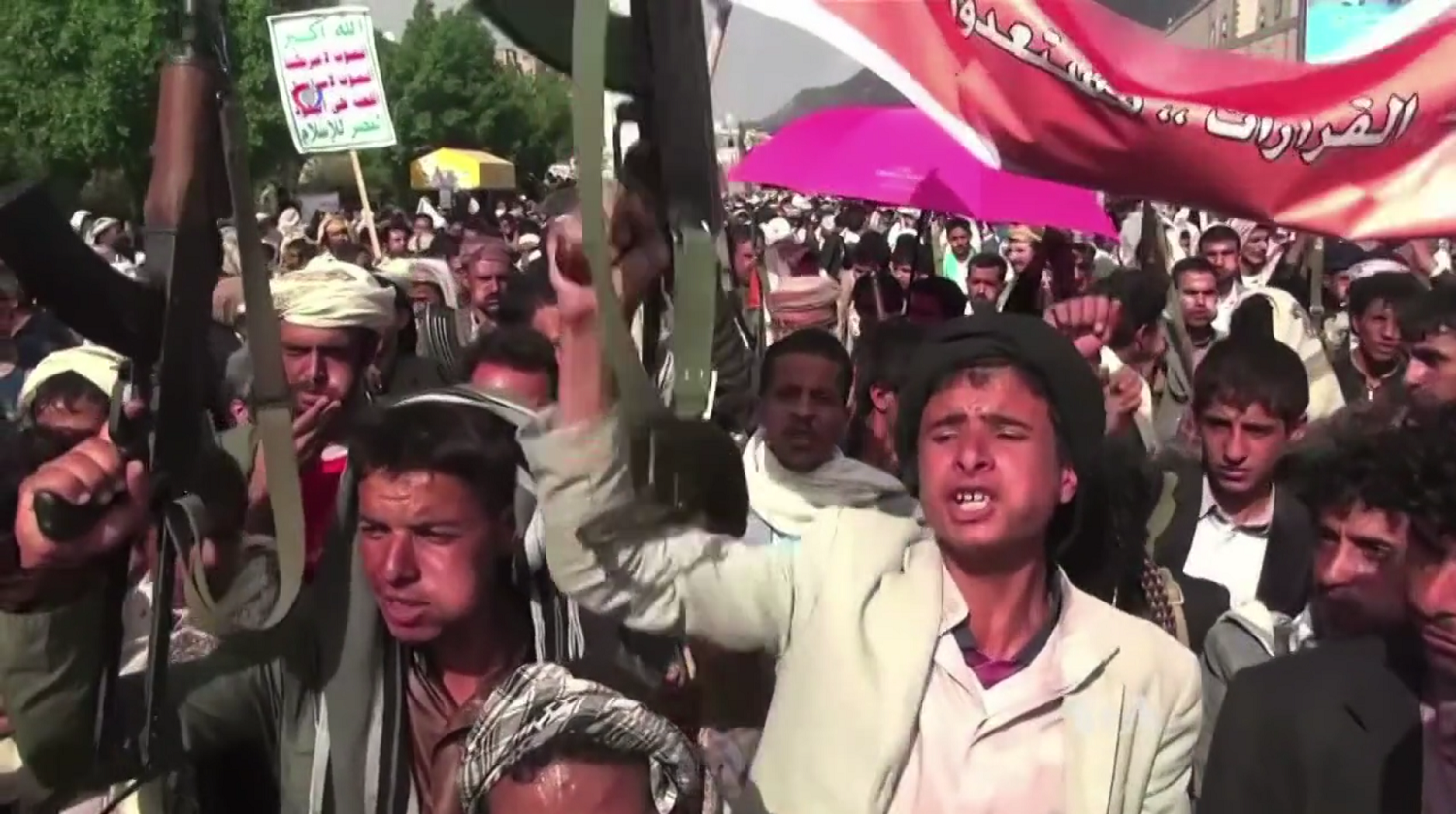
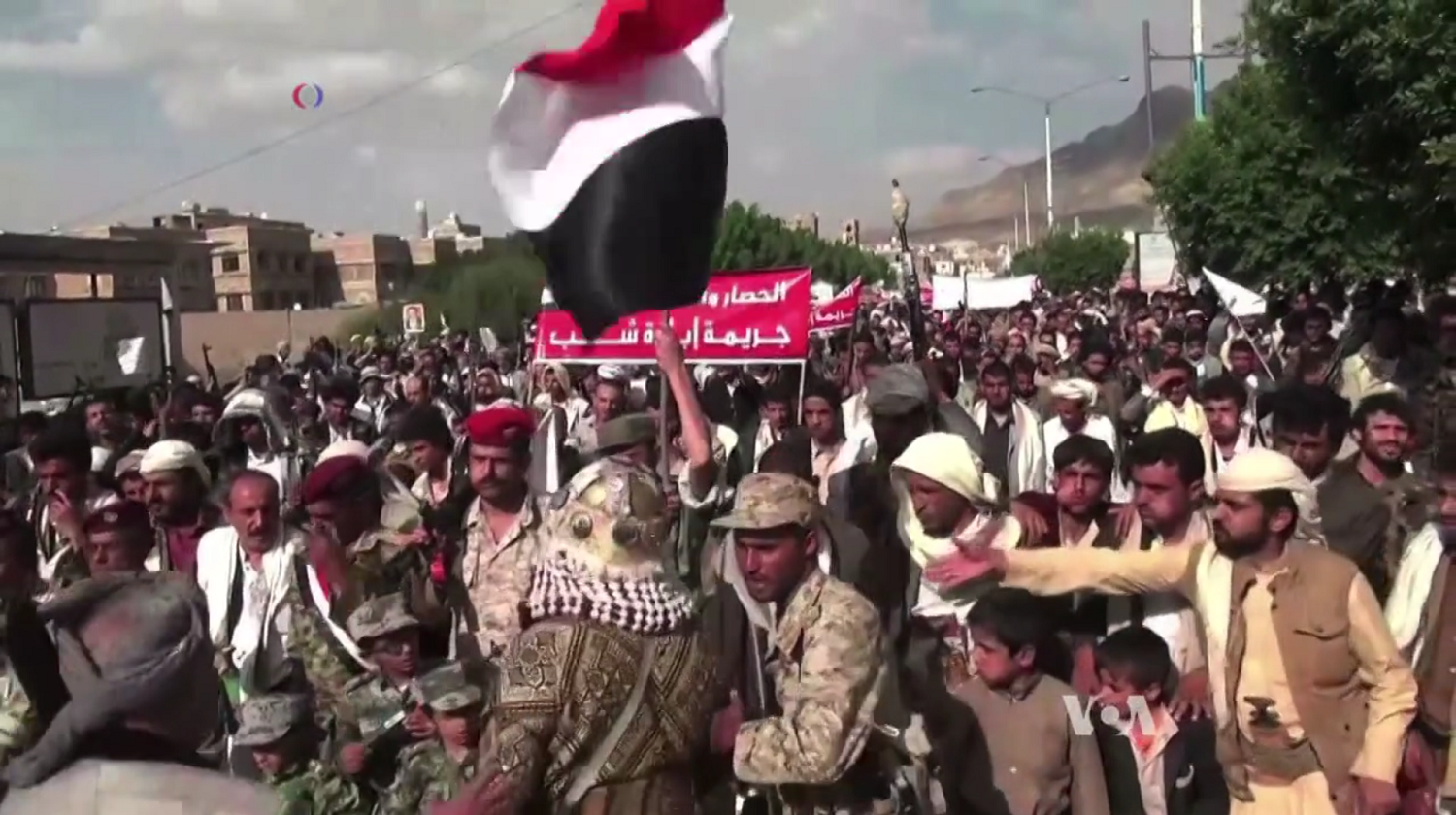
Houthis protest against airstrikes by the Saudi-led coalition on Sanaa in September 2015, carrying placards with the movement's slogans (upper image) as well as the flag of Yemen (below)

The Sarkha (Arabic: الصرخة, lit. 'The scream / The collective outcry') is the political slogan of the Houthis, a Zaydi-Shia revivalist political and military organization in Yemen, that reads "God is great, Death to America, Death to Israel, Curse the Jews, Victory to Islam" on a vertical banner of Arabic text. It is often printed on a white background, with the Islamic statements coloured green and the statements about the group's enemies appear in a red font resembling barbed wire.

The slogan and emblem of the Houthis (The Sarkha) translated as, "God is the Greatest, Death to America, Death to Israel, Curse the Jews, Victory to Islam".

==== Persecution of the Yemenite Jewish community ====
The Houthis have been accused of expelling or restricting members of the rural Yemeni Jewish community, which had about 50 remaining members. Reports of abuse include Houthi supporters bullying or attacking the country's Jews. Houthi officials have denied any involvement in the harassment, asserting that under Houthi control, Jews in Yemen would be able to live and operate freely as any other Yemeni citizen. "Our problems are with Zionism and the occupation of Palestine, but Jews here have nothing to fear," said Fadl Abu Taleb, a spokesman for the Houthis.

Despite insistence by Houthi leaders that the movement is not sectarian, a Yemeni Jewish rabbi has reportedly said that many Jews remain terrified by the movement's slogan. As a result, Yemeni Jews reportedly retain a negative sentiment towards the Houthis, who they allege have committed persecutions against them. According to Israeli Druze politician Ayoob Kara, Houthi militants had given an ultimatum telling Jews to "convert to Islam or leave Yemen".

In March 2016, a UAE-based newspaper reported that one of the Yemeni Jews who emigrated to Israel in 2016 was fighting with the Houthis. In the same month, a Kuwaiti newspaper, al-Watan, reported that a Yemeni Jew named Haroun al-Bouhi was killed in Najran while fighting with the Houthis against Saudi Arabia. The Kuwaiti newspaper added that the Yemeni Jews had a good relationship with Ali Abdullah Saleh, who was at that time allied with the Houthis and was fighting on different fronts with them.

Al-Houthi has said through his fascicles: "Arab countries and all Islamic countries will not be safe from Jews except through their eradication and the elimination of their entity." A New York Times journalist reported being asked why they were speaking to a "dirty Jew" and that the Jews in the village were unable to communicate with their neighbors.

==== Persecution of the Baháʼí community ====
The Houthis have been accused of detaining, torturing, arresting, and holding incommunicado Baháʼí Faith members on charges of espionage and apostasy, which are punishable by death. Houthi leader Abdel-Malek al-Houthi has targeted Baháʼís in public speeches, and accused the followers of Baháʼí Faith of being "satanic" and agents for the western countries, citing a 2013 fatwa issued by Iran's supreme leader.

== Membership and ranks ==
Houthi fighters in Yemen, August 2009

There is a difference between the al-Houthi family and the Houthi movement. The movement was called by their opponents and foreign media "Houthis". The name came from the surname of the early leader of the movement, Hussein al-Houthi, who died in 2004.

Membership of the group had between 1,000 and 3,000 fighters as of 2005 and between 2,000 and 10,000 fighters as of 2009. In 2010, the Yemen Post claimed that they had over 100,000 fighters. According to Houthi expert Ahmed Al-Bahri, by 2010, the Houthis had a total of 100,000–120,000 followers, including both armed fighters and unarmed loyalists. As of 2015, the group is reported to have attracted new supporters from outside their traditional demographics.

== Activism and tactics ==
=== Political ===
During their campaigns against both the Saleh and Hadi governments, Houthis used civil disobedience. Following the Yemeni government's decision on 13 July 2014 to increase fuel prices, Houthi leaders succeeded in organising massive rallies in the capital, Sanaa, to protest the decision and to demand resignation of the incumbent government of Abd Rabbuh Mansur Hadi for "state-corruption". These protests developed into the 2014–2015 phase of the insurgency. Similarly, following 2015 Saudi-led airstrikes against Houthis which claimed civilians lives, Yemenis responded to Abdul-Malik al-Houthi's call and took to streets of Sanaa by the tens of thousands to voice their anger at the Saudi invasion.

The movement's expressed goals include combating economic underdevelopment and political marginalization in Yemen while seeking greater autonomy for Houthi-majority regions of the country. One of its spokespeople, Mohammed al-Houthi, said in 2018 that he supports a democratic republic in Yemen. The Houthis have made fighting corruption the centerpiece of their political program.

=== Cultural ===
The Houthis have also held a number of mass gatherings since the revolution. On 24 January 2013, thousands gathered in Dahiyan, Sa'dah and Heziez, just outside Sanaa, to celebrate Mawlid al-Nabi, the birth of Mohammed. A similar event took place on 13 January 2014 at the main sports' stadium in Sanaa. On this occasion, men and women were completely segregated: men filled the open-air stadium and football field in the centre, guided by appointed Houthi safety officials wearing bright vests and matching hats; women poured into the adjacent indoor stadium, led inside by security women distinguishable only by their purple sashes and matching hats. The indoor stadium held at least five thousand women—ten times as many attendees as the 2013 gathering.

=== Media ===
The Houthis are said to have "a huge and well-oiled propaganda machine". They have established "a formidable media arm" with the Lebanese Hezbollah's technical support. The format and content of the group's leader, Abdul-Malik al-Houthi's televised speeches are said to have been modeled after those of Hezbollah's Secretary General, Hassan Nasrallah. Following the peaceful youth uprising in 2011, the group launched its official TV channel, Almasirah. The group operates up to 25 print and electronic newspapers, along with various online news services.

One of the most versatile form of Houthi mass media are the zawamil, a genre of primarily tribal oral poetry embedded in Yemen's social fabric. The zamil, rooted in cultural tradition, has been weaponised by the Houthis as a tool of propaganda and remains one of the most popular and rapidly growing platforms of Houthi propaganda, sung by popular vocalists like Issa al-Laith and disseminated through various social media platforms including YouTube, Twitter and Telegram. The Spectator describes Houthi zawamil as its most successful part of their propaganda, stressing the movement's claimed virtues of piety, bravery and poverty in comparison with the corruption, wealth and hypocrisy of their adversaries, the Saudi-led coalition, and Arab states allied to Israel.

The Houthis use radio as an effective tool for spreading influence, often seizing stations and confiscating equipment from outlets that fail to comply with their broadcast restrictions. In 2019, a Yemeni radio station aligned with the group raised 73.5 million Yemeni rials ($132,000) in a fundraising campaign for the Lebanese militant group Hezbollah.

=== Military ===
In 2009, U.S. Embassy sources have reported that Houthis used increasingly more sophisticated tactics and strategies in their conflict with the government as they gained more experience, and that they fought with religious fervor.

== Armed strength ==
The situation in March 2012

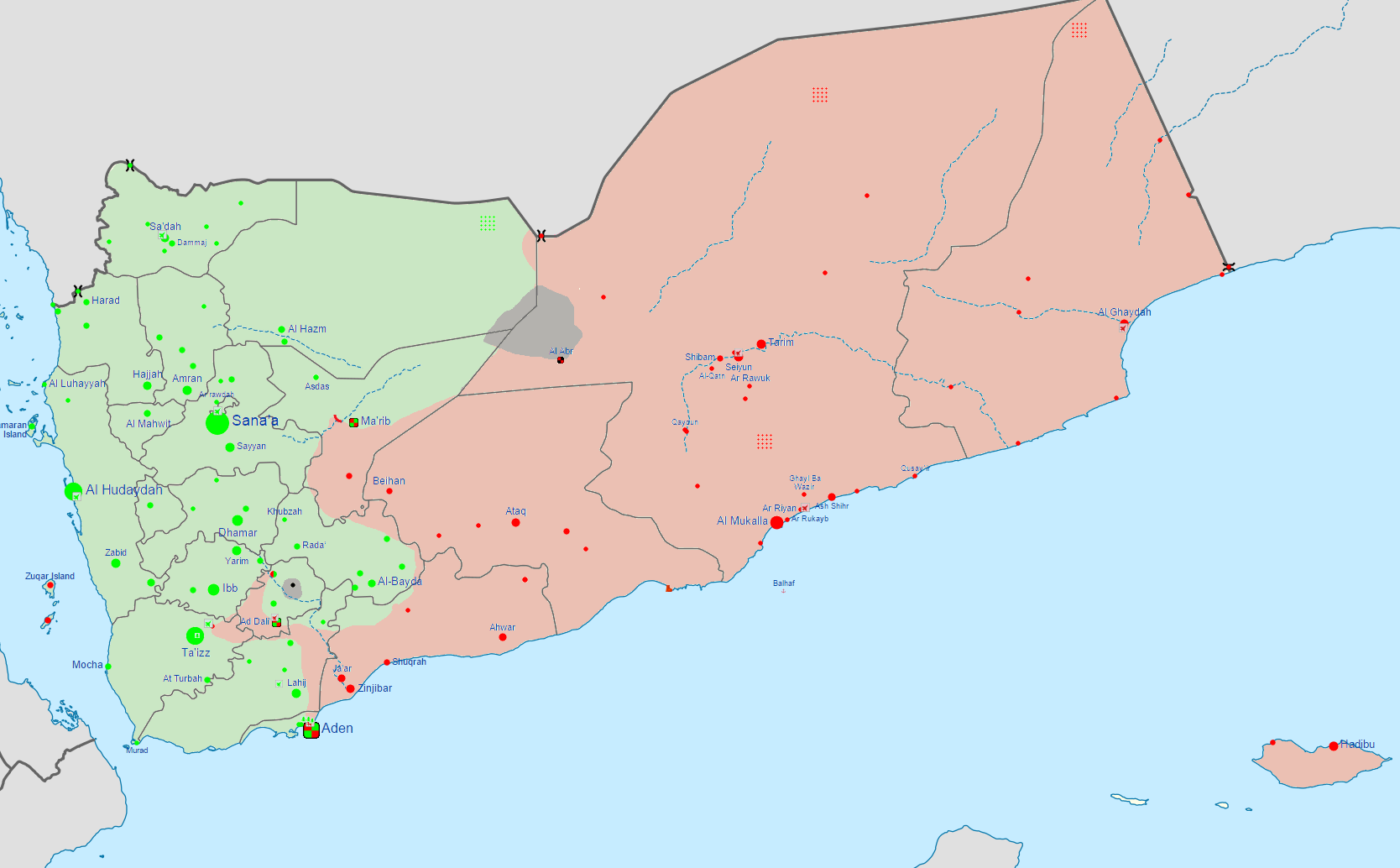
The situation in March 2015: Houthi dominance of Western third of Yemen

=== Aerial capabilities ===
The Houthis exert partial control over the Yemeni Air Force, and possess key air bases such as Al-Dailami and Al Hudaydah. The Houthi air force consists of a single Northrop F-5 fighter jet, which was seized from the Yemeni government. The group also flew a Soviet-era Mikoyan MiG-29 during a military parade over Sanaa in 2023. They also operate Mil Mi-17 helicopters seized during the civil war.

==== Missiles and drones ====
Since established in 2003, Hezbollah's Unit 3800 has provided the Houthis training and strategic assistance. Iran's Quds Force has smuggled weapons to the Houthis since 2009, mainly using dhows and small fishing boats. It began smuggling missile components as well by 2015. Between 2004 and 2010, the Houthis frequently looted Yemeni government weapons caches, which included Scud and OTR-21 Tochka missiles obtained during the 1994 Yemeni civil war, due to weak government control over its arsenal. In 2017, the UN reported that about 70% of the Yemeni military's weapons were likely lost.

In March 2015, the Saudi-led coalition claimed that it had destroyed most of the Houthis' missile capabilities during an air campaign, however Houthi missile attacks persisted. The Houthis, with technological help from Iran, began work on new missile variants by mid-2016, and by September they introduced the Burkan-1, a variant of the Scud with extended range. The following month, they introduced the Burkan-2H, which had a separating warhead. These weapons enabled the Houthis to strike targets deep in Saudi Arabia, including the capital Riyadh. After examining debris from the Burkan-2H, the UN concluded in December 2017 that the missile was supplied by Iran.

Late in 2015, Houthis announced the local production of short-range ballistic missile Qaher-1 on Al-Masirah TV. On 19 May 2017 Saudi Arabia intercepted a Houthi-fired ballistic missile targeting a deserted area south of the Saudi capital and most populous city Riyadh. The Houthi militias have captured dozens of tanks and masses of heavy weaponry from the Yemeni Armed Forces.

In February 2017, the Houthis revealed their drone program. Between mid-2018 and 2019, long-range ballistic missile attacks decreased in frequency, while the Houthis increasingly began using unmanned aerial vehicles (UAVs) and artillery. UAVs were used for both attacks on military and civilian targets and reconnaissance. The Qasef UAV, which can carry up to 30 kilograms (66 lb) of explosives, had been used in over a dozen Houthi attacks since 2016. The Sammad-2, Sammad-3, and Qasif-2K suicide drones were unveiled in 2019. Houthi drone attacks peaked in 2021, with many targeting Saudi Arabia.

In June 2019, the Saudi-led coalition stated that the Houthis had launched 226 ballistic missiles during the insurgency so far.

The 2019 Abqaiq–Khurais attack targeted the Saudi Aramco oil processing facilities at Abqaiq and Khurais in eastern Saudi Arabia on 14 September 2019. The Houthi movement claimed responsibility, though the United States has asserted that Iran was behind the attack. Iranian President Hassan Rouhani said that "Yemeni people are exercising their legitimate right of defence ... the attacks were a reciprocal response to aggression against Yemen for years."

The Houthis unveiled the Palestine-2 missile in June 2024, which closely resembled the Iranian Fattah-1 and Kheibar Shekan missiles. According to the Houthis, the missile was locally made, a claim rejected by defense analysts. In September, the missile was fired at Israel and landed in an open area near Ben Gurion Airport, traveling a distance of 2,000 kilometres (1,200 mi) in 11 minutes. The Houthis claimed that the rocket used two stage solid fuel, had a range of 2,150 kilometres (1,340 mi), and had a maximum speed of Mach 16. Israel and the US denied that the missile was hypersonic.

=== Naval warfare capabilities ===
In course of the Yemeni Civil War, the Houthis developed tactics to combat their opponents' navies. At first, their anti-ship operations were unsophisticated and limited to rocket-propelled grenades being shot at vessels close to the shore. In the fight to secure the port city of Aden in 2015, the Yemeni Navy was largely destroyed, including all missile-carrying vessels. A number of smaller patrol craft, landing craft, and Mi-14 and Ka-28 ASW helicopters did survive. Their existence under Houthi control would be brief, as the majority of them were destroyed in air attacks during the Saudi-led intervention in Yemen in 2015. As a result, the Houthis were left with AShMs (anti-ship missiles) stored ashore, but no launchers, and a smattering of small patrol ships. These, along with a number of locally manufactured small craft and miscellaneous vessels, were to form the foundation of the new naval warfare capabilities.

Soon after the Houthis took over Yemen in 2015, Iran sought to strengthen the Houthis' naval capabilities, allowing the Houthis, and thus Iran, to intercept Coalition shipping off the Red Sea coast, by providing additional AShMs and constructing truck-based launchers that could easily be hidden after a launch. Iran also anchored the MV Saviz intelligence vessel, disguised as a regular cargo vessel, off the coast of Eritrea, that provided intelligence and updates on Coalition ship movements to the Houthis. The Saviz served in this capacity until it was damaged in an Israeli limpet mine attack in April 2021, when it was replaced by the MV Behshad. The Behshad, like the Saviz, is based on a cargo ship.

Meanwhile, in Yemen, the Houthis, presumably with the assistance of Iranian engineers, converted a number of 10-meter-long patrol craft donated by the UAE to the Yemeni Coast Guard in the early 2010s into WBIEDs (water born improvised explosive devices). In 2017, one of these was used to attack the Saudi frigate Al Madinah. In the years since, three more WBIED designs have been built: the Tawfan-1, Tawfan-2, and Tawfan-3. 15 different types of naval mines were also produced. These are being increasingly deployed in the Red Sea, but have yet to be successful against naval vessels. The delivery of 120 km-ranged Noor and 200 km-ranged Qader AShMs, 300 km-ranged Khalij Fars ASBMs, and Fajr-4CL and "Al-Bahr Al-Ahmar" anti-ship rockets by Iran, which were unveiled during a 2022 Houthi parade, was arguably the most significant escalation in support. They combine long range, low cost, and high mobility with various types of guidance to create a weapon well-suited to the Houthi Navy.

Though the Houthis' ASBM arsenal has yet to be tested, the Houthi Navy has had notable success with AShMs. On 1 October 2016, it was able to hit the UAE Navy's HSV-2 Swift hybrid catamaran with a single C-801/C-802 AShM fired from a shore battery. Although the ship managed to stay afloat, the damage was so severe that it had to be decommissioned. The US Navy then sent two destroyers and an amphibious transport dock to the area to ensure that shipping could continue unabated. These vessels were then attacked with AShMs on three separate occasions, with no success.

Though these attacks demonstrated the Houthis' limited ability to threaten vessels in Yemen's surrounding seas, the threat posed by them has since evolved significantly. Armed with a variety of anti-ship ballistic missiles and rockets that can be notoriously difficult to intercept and cover large areas, the next round of maritime clashes with the navies of the United Arab Emirates, Saudi Arabia, and the United States could have a completely different outcome. The Houthis have also hinted at using their extensive arsenal of loitering munitions against commercial shipping in the Red Sea, a tactic similar to recent Iranian tactics in the Persian Gulf.

Patrol boats were fitted with anti-tank guided missiles, about 30 coast-watcher stations were set up, disguised "spy dhows" were constructed, and the maritime radar of docked ships used to create targeting solutions for attacks. One of the most notable features of the Houthis' naval arsenal became its remote-controlled drone boats which carry explosives and ram enemy warships. Among these, the self-guiding Shark-33 explosive drone boats originated as patrol boats of the old Yemeni coast guard. In addition, the Houthis have begun to train combat divers on the Zuqar and Bawardi islands.

== Foreign relations and support ==
Former Yemeni president Ali Abdullah Saleh had accused the Houthis of having ties to external backers, in particular the Iranian government; Saleh stated in an interview with The New York Times,

The real reason they received unofficial support from Iran was because they repeat same slogan that is raised by Iran – death to America, death to Israel. We have another source for such accusations. The Iranian media repeats statements of support for these [Houthi] elements. They are all trying to take revenge against the USA on Yemeni territories.

Such backing has been reported by diplomatic correspondents of major news outlets (e.g., Patrick Wintour of The Guardian), and has been the reported perspective of Yemeni governmental leaders militarily and politically opposing Houthi efforts (e.g., as of 2017, the UN-recognized, deposed Yemeni President Abd Rabbu Mansour Hadi, who referred to the "Houthi rebels... as 'Iranian militias'".

The Houthis in turn accused the Saleh government of being backed by Saudi Arabia and of using Al-Qaeda to repress them. Under the next President Hadi, Gulf Arab states accused Iran of backing the Houthis financially and militarily, though Iran denied this, and they were themselves backers of President Hadi. Despite confirming statements by Iranian and Yemeni officials in regards to Iranian support in the form of trainers, weaponry, and money, the Houthis denied reception of substantial financial or arm support from Iran. Joost Hiltermann of Foreign Policy wrote that whatever little material support the Houthis may have received from Iran, the intelligence and military support by US and UK for the Saudi Arabian-led coalition exceed that by many factors.

In April 2015, the United States National Security Council spokesperson Bernadette Meehan remarked that "It remains our assessment that Iran does not exert command and control over the Houthis in Yemen". Joost Hiltermann wrote that Iran does not control the Houthis' decision-making as evidenced by Houthis' flat rejection of Iran's demand not to take over Sanaa in 2015. Thomas Juneau, writing in the journal, International Affairs, states that even though Iran's support for Houthis has increased since 2014, it remains far too limited to have a significant impact in the balance of power in Yemen. The Quincy Institute for Responsible Statecraft argues that Teheran's influence over the movement has been "greatly exaggerated" by "the Saudis, their coalition partners (mainly the United Arab Emirates), and their [lobbyists] in Washington." Similarly, academics such as Marieke Brandt and Charles Schmitz have stated that the allegation that the Houthis are merely an Iranian proxy force has its roots in political narratives by Saleh, Saudi Arabia, the United States and other anti-Houthi forces. While the Houthis have praised post-Islamic Revolution Iran for its opposition to American and Israeli imperialism in the Middle East, they have also criticized Iranian political and religious doctrine, including Iran's state religion of Twelver Shi'ism.

A December 2009 cable between Sanaa and various intelligence agencies in the US diplomatic cables leak states that US State Dept. analysts believed the Houthis obtained weapons from the Yemeni black market and corrupt members of the Yemenis Republican Guard. On the edition of 8 April 2015 of PBS Newshour, Secretary of State John Kerry stated that the US knew Iran was providing military support to the Houthi rebels in Yemen, adding that Washington "is not going to stand by while the region is destabilised".

Phillip Smyth of the Washington Institute for Near East Policy told Business Insider that Iran views Shia groups in the Middle East as "integral elements to the Islamic Revolutionary Guard Corps (IRGC)". Smyth claimed that there is a strong bond between Iran and the Houthi uprising working to overthrow the government in Yemen. According to Smyth, in many cases Houthi leaders go to Iran for ideological and religious education, and Iranian and Hezbollah leaders have been spotted on the ground advising the Houthi troops, and these Iranian advisers are likely responsible for training the Houthis to use the type of sophisticated guided missiles fired at the US Navy.

To some commentators (e.g., Alex Lockie of Business Insider), Iran's support for the revolt in Yemen is "a good way to bleed the Saudis", a recognized regional and ideological rival of Iran. Essentially, from that perspective, Iran is backing the Houthis to fight against a Saudi-led coalition of Gulf States whose aim is to maintain control of Yemen.

In early 2013, photographs released by the Yemeni government show the United States Navy and Yemen's security forces seizing a class of "either modern Chinese- or Iranian-made" shoulder-fired, heat-seeking anti-aircraft missiles "in their standard packaging", missiles "not publicly known to have been out of state control", raising concerns of Iran's arming of the rebels. In April 2016, the U.S. Navy intercepted a large Iranian arms shipment, seizing thousands of AK-47 rifles, rocket-propelled grenade launchers, and 0.50-caliber machine guns, a shipment described as likely headed to Yemen by the Pentagon. Based on 2019 reporting from The Jerusalem Post, the Houthis have also repeatedly used a drone nearly identical to Iran Aircraft Manufacturing Industrial Company's Ababil-T drone in strikes against Saudi Arabia. In late October 2023, Israel stated that it had intercepted a "surface-to-surface long-range ballistic missile and two cruise missiles that were fired by the Houthi rebels in Yemen"; per reporting from Axios.com, this "was Israel's first-ever operational use of the Arrow system for intercepting ballistic missiles since the war began".

The continuing interceptions and seizures of weapons at sea, attributed to Iranian origins, is a matter tracked by the United States Institute of Peace.

=== Iran ===
In 2013, an Iranian vessel was seized and discovered to be carrying Katyusha rockets, heat-seeking surface-to-air missiles, RPG-7s, Iranian-made night vision goggles and artillery systems that track land and navy targets 40 km away. That was en route to the Houthis.

In March 2017, Qasem Soleimani, head of Iran's Quds Force, met with Iran's Islamic Revolutionary Guard Corps (IRGC) regarding the "newly accelerated effort to empower the Houthis", including the provision of weapons and training. Soleimani was quoted as saying, "At this meeting, they agreed to increase the amount of help, through training, arms and financial support." Despite the Iranian government, and Houthis both officially denying Iranian support for the group. Brigadier General Ahmad Asiri, the spokesman of the Saudi-led coalition told Reuters that evidence of Iranian support was manifested in the Houthi use of Kornet anti-tank guided missiles which had never been in use with the Yemeni military or with the Houthis and that the arrival of Kornet missiles had only come at a later time. In the same month the IRGC had altered the routes used in transporting equipment to the Houthis by spreading out shipments to smaller vessels in Kuwaiti territorial waters in order to avoid naval patrols in the Gulf of Oman due to sanctions imposed, shipments reportedly included parts of missiles, launchers, and drugs.

In May 2018, the United States imposed sanctions on Iran's IRGC, which was also listed as a designated terrorist organization by the US over its role in providing support for the Houthis, including help with manufacturing ballistic missiles used in attacks targeting cities and oil fields in Saudi Arabia. In August 2018, despite previous Iranian denial of military support for the Houthis, IRGC commander Nasser Shabani was quoted by the Iranian Fars News Agency as saying, "We (IRGC) told Yemenis [Houthi rebels] to strike two Saudi oil tankers, and they did it", on 7 August 2018. In response to Shabani's account, the IRGC released a statement saying that the quote was a "Western lie" and that Shabani was a retired commander, despite no actual reports of his retirement after 37 years in the IRGC, and media linked to the Iranian government confirming he was still enlisted with the IRGC. Furthermore, while the Houthis and the Iranian government have previously denied any military affiliation, Iranian supreme leader Ali Khamenei announced his "spiritual" support of the movement in a personal meeting with the Houthi spokesperson Mohammed Abdul Salam in Tehran, in the midst of ongoing conflicts in Aden in 2019.

In 2024, commanders from IRGC and Hezbollah were reported to be actively involved on the ground in Yemen, overseeing and directing Houthi attacks on Red Sea shipping, according to a report by Reuters. In July 2024, the United States targeted new sanctions focusing on IRGC ties with the group. The Houthis dismissed the sanctions as pathetic and powerless. In 2024, Israel also placed sanctions on the Houthis.

In September 2026, the G7 foreign ministers issued a joint statement condemning Houthi attacks on Saudi Arabia and calling on Iran to end its support for the Houthis.

=== North Korea ===
In August 2018, Reuters reported that a confidential United Nations investigation had found the North Korean government had failed to discontinue its nuclear and missile delivery programs, and in conjunction, was "cooperating militarily with Syria" and was "trying to sell weapons to Yemen's Houthis".

In August 2019, the South Korean National Intelligence Service had tracked the Scuds missiles (used to attack Saudi Arabia) back to North Korea.

In January 2024, South Korea's Yonhap News Agency reported that North Korea had evidently shipped weapons to Houthis via Iran, based on the writings in Hangul script that were found on missiles launched towards Israel.

North Korea considers the Houthis as a "resistance force".

In March 2025, after the airstrikes by the US Air Force commenced, North Korean Ambassador to Egypt, Ma Dong-hee, who is also accredited to Yemen, condemned the attacks on the Houthis as a threat to regional and global order.

=== Russia ===
It was noted by Newsweek in July 2024 that the Houthis were in possession of Russian-made P-800 Oniks missiles, and that the transfer had likely occurred via Syria and Iran. In July 2024, The Wall Street Journal reported that US officials saw increasing indications that Russia was considering arming the Houthis with advanced anti-ship missiles via Iranian smuggling routes in response to US support for Ukraine during the Russo-Ukrainian war. However, it did not follow through due to pushback by the US and Saudi Arabia. In August 2024, Middle East Eye, citing a US official, reported that personnel of Russia's GRU were stationed in Houthi-controlled parts of Yemen to assist the militia's attacks on merchant ships. In October, The Wall Street Journal reported that Russia was supplying the Houthis with geospatial intelligence to target Western ships.

=== China ===
China recognizes the internationally recognized government of Yemen, currently the Presidential Leadership Council. Chinese diplomatic discourses generally avoid criticizing the Houthis by name. China typically makes its criticisms of the Houthi movement via indirect statements, which condemn actions without specifically naming the party responsible. During the Houthi attacks on commercial vessels in response to the Gaza War, China stated that the Houthis should respect the navigation rights of the merchant ships of all countries in the Red Sea in accordance with international law and "immediately cease their acts of harassment." China requested that Iran use its influence with the Houthi movement in attempt to restrain Houthi attacks on civilian ships.

In the 2020s, China overtook Iran as a largest supplier of weapons and dual-use equipment to the Houthis, according to The Century Foundation. Two China based companies were sanctioned by America in 2024 for providing "dual-use materials and components needed to manufacture, maintain, and deploy an arsenal of advanced missiles and unmanned aerial vehicles (UAVs) against U.S. and allied interests." A report by the Foundation for Defense of Democracies stated that the Houthis were using weapons made in China for their attacks on shipping in the Red Sea in exchange for Chinese ships having safe passage through the Sea. Another report from Israel's i24 News stated that China provided the Houthis with "advanced components and guidance equipment" for their missiles. The Institute for the Study of War reported that the Houthis supplement their weaponry through additional arms and dual use components sourced from Russia or China. For example, Yemeni border customs seized 800 Chinese-made drone propellers in a shipment bound for the Houthis, and in August 2024 had also purchased Hydrogen Fuel Cylinders from Chinese suppliers which aimed to increase the range and payloads of the Houthis' drones. According to The Wall Street Journal, the Houthis sent a group from Saada to Beijing to study Mandarin and manage the supply of drones and missile guidance systems from China and Hong Kong to Yemen.

According to the United States Department of State, Chinese state-owned Chang Guang Satellite Technology Corporation has provided geospatial intelligence to the Houthis to target U.S. warships in the Red Sea. The reason for the company supplying such satellite imagery was speculated by academic Thomas Juneau to be for China to ensure its commercial ships in the Red Sea are not targeted. On 28 July 2026, following the Houthi blockade of Saudi Arabia that started on 20 July, Reuters reported that China had held direct talks with the Houthis and Iran to enable its tankers to pass through the Red Sea without being attacked. It reported that China was clearing each vessel with the Houthis individually, and both sides have informed Iran of their actions. On 17 September, following the 2026 Yemen offensives, Reuters reported that China was seeking to pressure Iran to reign in the Houthis and help prevent the conflict spreading further across energy routes on which China depends. It reporters that Iran responded by saying that stability and peace in the region depend on ending the Iran war. The Wall Street Journal reported in October 2026 that Houthis have relied on Chinese equipment and parts to build a version of the Kheibar Shekan ballistic missile. Shao Zheng, chargé d'affaires of the Chinese Embassy to Yemen, denied the reports as baseless and urged the Houthis to abandon military action and return to peaceful dialogue.

=== Salafi Jihadist groups ===
In 2024, a UN report states that Al-Shabaab and Houthis had a relationship that was "transactional or opportunistic, and not ideological", while a 2025 report states that their relationship was deepening and posed a threat to regional security. According to the Africa Center for Strategic Studies, al Shabaab is provided with weapons and training while also receiving assistance in expanding the criminal enterprises that fund their operations. While the Houthis benefit by expanding their influence, strengthening Anti-American forces in the region, and weakening pro-American forces in the region. Additionally both sides assist each other in smuggling operations.

The Al-Qaeda in the Arabian Peninsula (AQAP) and Houthis had previously fought, but since 2022 they have had a ceasefire. As part of this ceasefire they have cooperated in attacks against Yemeni government, provided safe havens for each other in their territories, and cooperating in security and intelligence.

== Human rights violations ==
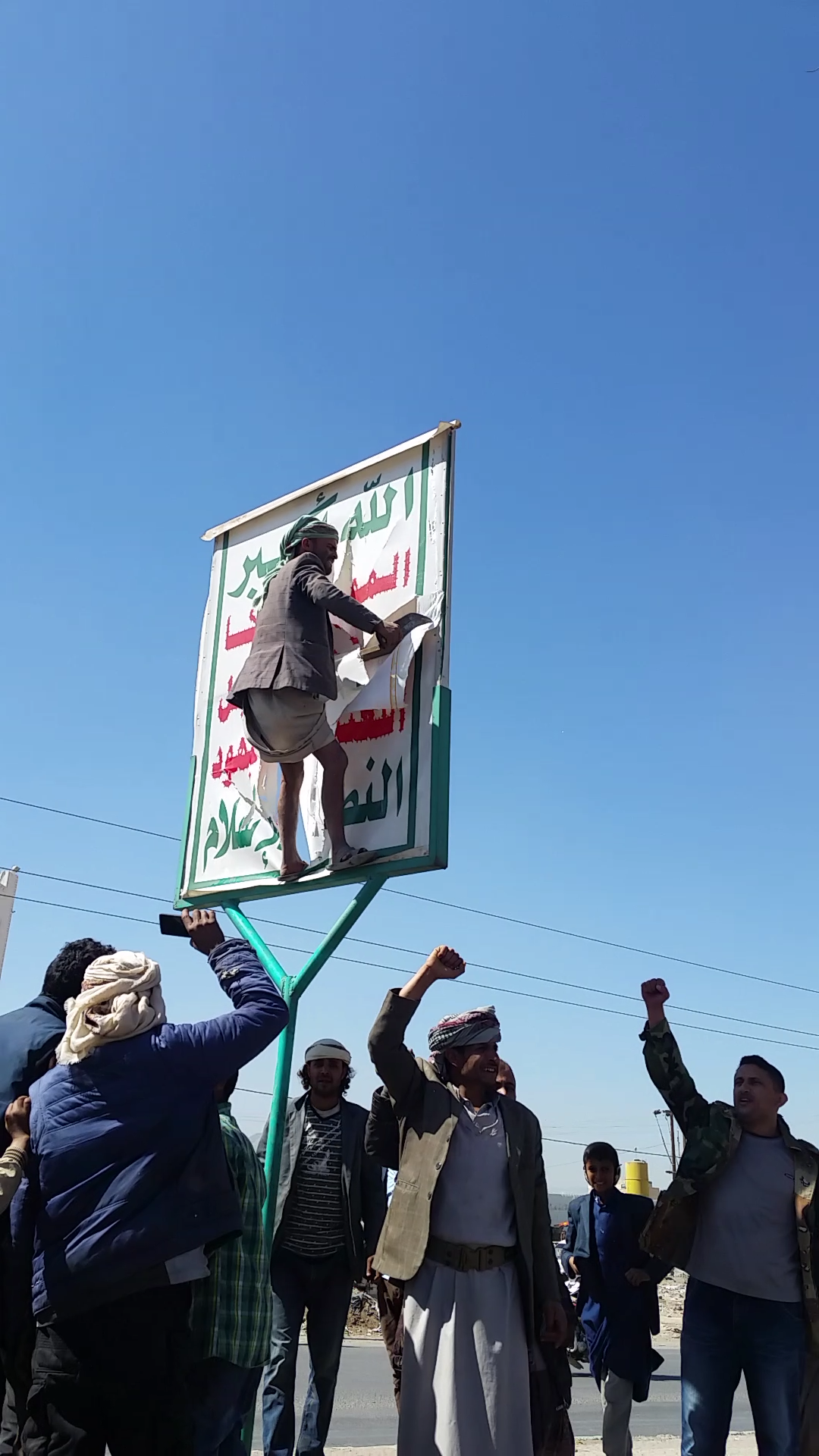
Protestors tear down a Houthi poster amid the battle of Sanaa between pro-Houthi forces, and forces loyal to ex-President Ali Abdullah Saleh.

According to the Panel of Experts on Yemen established pursuant to Security Council resolution 2140, the Houthis have carried out a wide range of human rights violations, including violations of international humanitarian law and abuse of women and children. Children as young as 13 have been arrested for "indecent acts" for alleged homosexual orientation or "political cases" when their families do not comply with Houthi ideology or regulations. Minors share cells with adult prisoners, and according to unspecified reports that the Panel has deemed "credible", boys held in Al-Shahid Al-Ahmar police station in Sana'a are systematically raped. Aside from the Panel of Experts, London-based Arabic newspaper Asharq Al-Awsat alleges that the Houthis have revived slavery in Yemen.

=== Child soldiers and human shields ===
Houthis have been accused of violations of international humanitarian law, such as using child soldiers, shelling civilian areas, forced evacuations and executions. According to Human Rights Watch, Houthis intensified their recruitment of children in 2015. UNICEF mentioned that children with the Houthis and other armed groups in Yemen comprise up to a third of all fighters in Yemen. Human Rights Watch has further accused Houthi forces of using landmines in Yemen's third-largest city of Taizz, which has caused many civilian casualties and prevented the return of families displaced by the fighting. HRW has also accused the Houthis of interfering with the work of Yemen's human rights advocates and organizations.

In 2009, HRW researcher Christoph Wilcke said that although the Republic of Yemen Government accused the Houthis of using civilians as human shields, HRW did not have enough evidence to conclude that the Houthis were intentionally doing so. Nonetheless, Wilcke stated that there may have been cases in which HRW was unable to document. Akram Al Walidi, one of four journalists detained by the Houthis on spying charges and then released in April 2023 as part of a prisoner exchange deal between the former and the internationally recognized government of Yemen, said he felt like the four were human shields after the Houthis moved them to one of their military camps at Sanaa in October 2020 since it was an expected target of Saudi airstrikes.

=== Hostage-taking ===
According to the Human Rights Watch, the Houthis also use hostage taking as a tactic to generate profit. Human Rights Watch documented 16 cases in which Houthi authorities held people unlawfully, in large part to extort money from relatives or to exchange them for people held by opposing forces.

=== Diversion of international aid ===
The United Nations World Food Programme has accused the Houthis of diverting food aid and illegally removing food lorries from distribution areas, with rations sold on the open market or given to those not entitled to them. The WFP has also warned that aid could be suspended to areas of Yemen under the control of Houthi rebels due to "obstructive and uncooperative" Houthi leaders that have hampered the independent selection of beneficiaries. WFP spokesman Herve Verhoosel stated "The continued blocking by some within the Houthi leadership of the biometric registration ... is undermining an essential process that would allow us to independently verify that food is reaching ... people on the brink of famine". The WFP has warned that "unless progress is made on previous agreements we will have to implement a phased suspension of aid". The Norwegian Refugee Council has stated that they share the WPF's frustrations and reiterate to the Houthis to allow humanitarian agencies to distribute food.

=== Abuse of women and girls ===
The United Nations Human Rights Council published a report covering the period July 2019 to June 2020, which contained evidence of the Houthis' recruitment of boys as young as seven years old and the recruitment of 34 girls aged between 13 and 17 years of age, to act as spies, recruiters of other children, guards, medics, and members of a female fighting force. Twelve girls suffered sexual violence, arranged marriages, and child marriages as a result of their recruitment.

Under Houthi-controlled areas, women have been blocked from travelling without a mahram (male guardian) even for essential healthcare. This also affected humanitarian operations by the United Nations in Yemen, forcing female staff to office jobs. The Houthis use allegations of prostitution as a tool for public defamation against Yemeni women, including those in the diaspora engaged in politics, civil society, or human rights activism, alongside threats to individuals and families. Detained women have been sexually assaulted, subjected to virginity tests, and often blocked from accessing essential goods. Torture of female detainees is also carried out by the Zaynabiyat, the Houthi female police wing.

Anadolu Agency reported on Yemen-based rights groups documenting 1,181 violations against women committed by Houthis from 2017 to 2020. Yemeni activist Samira Abdullah al-Houry was held in a Houthi jail for three months and gave numerous interviews after her release on alleged torture and rape by Houthi guards. Her testimony contributed to UN Security Council sanctions being imposed on two Houthi security officials in February 2021. It was later alleged that she admitted some of her testimony was untrue, and she had embellished claims at the request of Saudi officials.

=== Abuse of LGBTQ+ people ===
According to Amnesty International on 9 February 2024, two Houthi-run courts in Yemen sentenced 48 individuals either to death, flogging, or prison over charges related to same-sex conduct in the past month.

=== Abuse of migrants ===
According to Human Rights Watch, Houthi militias have "beaten, raped, and tortured detained migrants and asylum seekers from the Horn of Africa." UN experts have warned that female migrants face sexual violence, forced labor, and forced drug trafficking by smugglers who collaborate with the Houthi-controlled Yemen Immigration, Passport and Nationality Authority (IPNA).

=== Detention of UN worker ===
Mohammad el Shami, a worker at the UN Human Rights Office in Yemen, died in October 2026, after being held in Houthi custody since June 2024. UN High Commissioner for Human Rights Volker Türk called for an investigation into the death.

== Governance ==
According to a 2009 leaked US Embassy cable, Houthis have reportedly established courts and prisons in areas they control. They impose their own laws on local residents, demand protection money, and dispense rough justice by ordering executions. AP's reporter, Ahmad al-Haj argued that the Houthis were winning hearts and minds by providing security in areas long neglected by the Yemeni government while limiting the arbitrary and abusive power of influential sheikhs. According to the Civic Democratic Foundation, Houthis help resolve conflicts between tribes and reduce the number of revenge killings in areas they control. The US ambassador believed that the reports that explain Houthi role as arbitrating local disputes were likely.

=== Public opinion ===
A survey conducted in 2024 by the Sana'a Center for Strategic Studies found that only 8% of Yemenis in Houthi-controlled areas had a positive view of the Houthi movement, compared to 3% in both government-controlled areas and contested areas. Conversely, 20%, 34%, and 39% in these areas, respectively, expressed negative views.

== Sanctions ==
Yemen Designated the Houthis as a terrorist organization

In January 2024, the US and UK imposed sanctions on key Houthi figures, including the defense minister, in response to the Houthi attacks on international shipping in the Red Sea that escalated in November 2023. The new sanctions were imposed in addition to the existing sanctions against 11 Houthi individuals and 2 entities, which remained in force.

On 28 April 2025, the U.S. Treasury Department sanctioned three shipping companies for their role in delivering oil products to the Houthis. The deliveries took place via the Houthi-controlled port of Ras Isa.

== United States attacks on Yemen ==
The U.S. launched a military campaign against Yemen in mid-March 2025, which it said was directed at Houthi military and strategic targets. The attacks killed 153 civilians and wounded 243 more, according to the Pentagon's own assessment. The deaths included women and children, according to the Houthis. The group, backed by Iran, state that their operations, which have affected global trade, are in solidarity with Palestinians in Gaza.

== See also ==
- Iranian support for the Houthis
- List of islands of Yemen
- List of military units named after people
- Red Sea crisis – Houthi involvement in the Gaza war
- Timeline of the Yemeni crisis (2011–present)
- Outline of the Yemeni crisis, revolution, and civil war (2011–present)
- Muhammad Abd al-Karim al-Ghamari
