= Sarkha =

Slogan of the Houthi movement

- God is great Death to America; Death to Israel; Curse the Jews; Victory to Islam
- Use: Other
- Adopted: c. 2003; 23 years ago
- Design: Vertical white banner with a green border and five Arabic statements from top to bottom in the centre: green text for pro-Islamic statements and red text for anti-American, anti-Israeli, and antisemitic statements.
- Designed by: Hussein al-Houthi

The Sarkha (Arabic: الصرخة, lit. 'The scream / The collective outcry') is the political slogan of the Houthis, a Zaydi-Shia revivalist political and military organization in Yemen, that reads "God is great, Death to America, Death to Israel, Curse the Jews, Victory to Islam" on a vertical banner of Arabic text. It is often printed on a white background, with the Islamic statements coloured green and the statements about the group's enemies appear in a red font resembling barbed wire.

== Design and symbolism ==
Modeled on a motto from revolutionary Iran, the Houthi slogan, called the Sarkha, is: "God is great, Death to America, Death to Israel, Curse the Jews, Victory to Islam." (Note: Arabic: الله أكبر، الموت لأمريكا، الموت لإسرائيل، اللعنة على اليهود، النصر للإسلام, romanized: Allāhu ʾakbar, al-mawt li-ʾAmrīkā, al-mawt li-ʾIsrāʾīl, al-laʿnah ʿalā 'l-Yahūd, an-naṣr li-l-ʾIslām)

The Sarkha was originally not tied to the Houthi movement, and its exact origin is disputed. The slogan was first chanted at the Imam al-Hadi school in Marran, Haydan district, Saada in January 2002, although it is claimed that the then-leader of the movement, Hussein al-Houthi, used it after seeing footage of the killing of young Palestinian Muhammad al-Durrah during the Second Intifada in 2000.

Banners bearing the Sarkha are printed on a white background, with the written text in red and green; the pro-Islamic statements are coloured green while the statements about their enemies, United States, Israel, and the Jews, appear in a red font resembling barbed wire. The Anti-American sentiment of the slogan was a result of the resentment of the Houthis towards the U.S. war on terror as they viewed the then-president Ali Abdullah Saleh's participation in the war as an implied approval of America's "occupation and colonization of the Middle East." Hussein al-Houthi noted during a sermon in January 2002 that he had included Jews in the slogan because "they are the ones who move this world", a reference to the idea of Jewish world domination, and in another he said Muslims "will not be delivered from the evil of the Jews except by their eradication, and by the elimination of their entity [Israel]".

== History ==
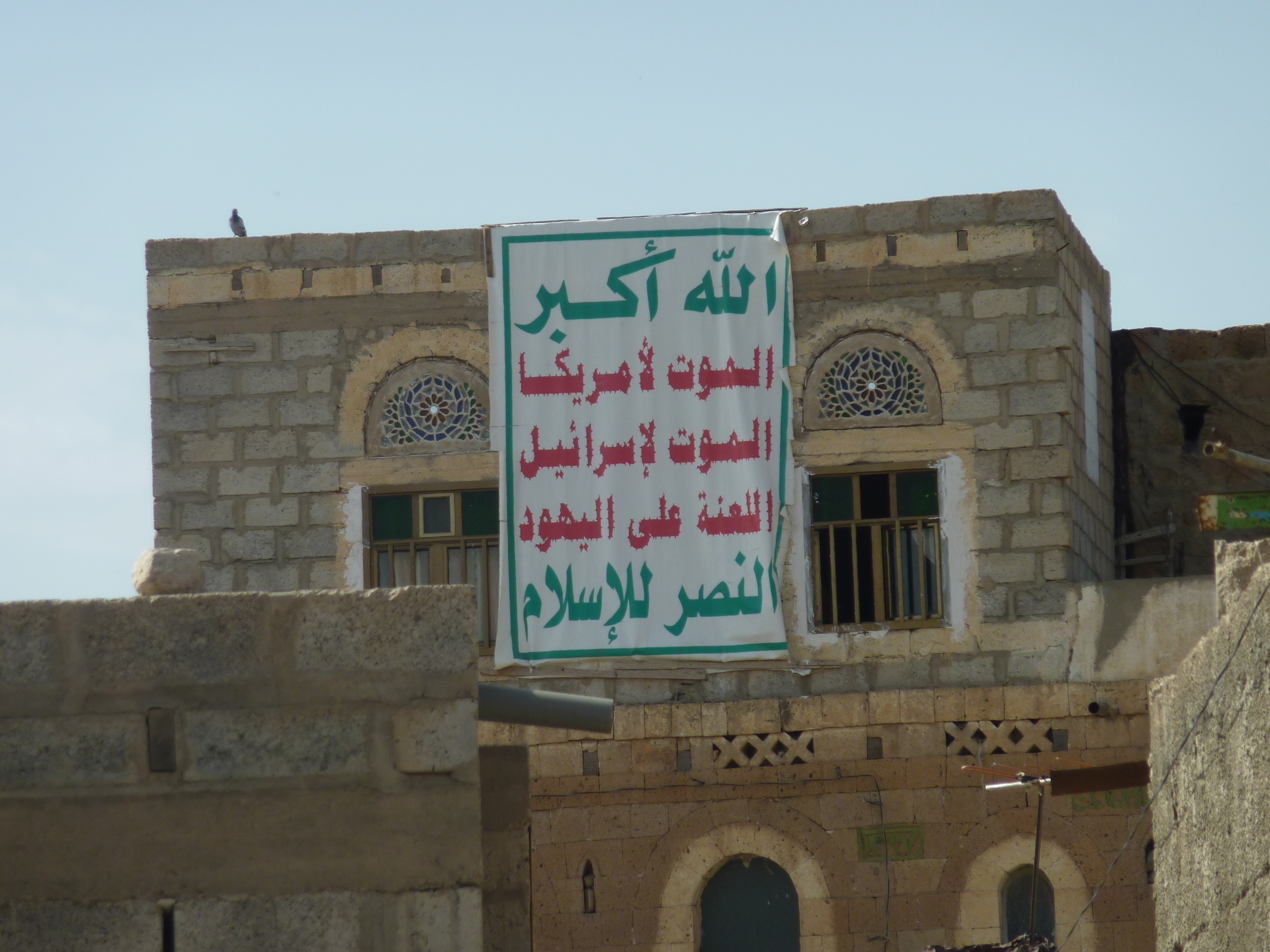
A building in Dhamar, Yemen, bearing the Houthi slogan banner

The slogan eventually became a sign of public protest against the dictatorship of the Yemeni president Ali Abdullah Saleh. It was first widely used during a visit by Saleh to Saada in January 2003. At the time, the president intended to make a speech during the Friday prayers, but was drowned out by locals who chanted the slogan to protest against his policies. The Yemeni government responded with a crackdown, and 600 people were arrested for having used the slogan. This only worsened the situation, and the slogan spread in northern Yemen.

The Houthi movement officially adopted the slogan in the wake of the widely condemned 2003 United States invasion of Iraq. This brought the movement on a collision course with the government, as the government maintained its official pro-American politics despite public opposition. The slogan was outlawed. The Houthis refused to discard it, arguing that the constitution of Yemen protected free speech. By 2004, crackdowns against both the slogan and the Houthi movement intensified. Many Houthis were imprisoned and even tortured for having used it. The conflict between the Houthis and the government eventually resulted in the outbreak of the Houthi insurgency.

Houthi supporters state that their ire for the U.S. and Israel is directed toward the respective countries' governments. Ali al-Bukhayti, the spokesperson and official media face of the Houthis, rejected the literal interpretation of the slogan by stating in an interview: "We do not really want death to anyone. The slogan is simply against the interference of those governments [i.e., U.S. and Israel]." In the Arabic Houthi-affiliated TV and radio stations they use religious connotations associated with jihad against Israel and the US.

Despite the religious overtones of their slogan, the Houthis self-identify as a Yemeni nationalist group opposed to the oppression of all Yemenis, including Sunni Muslims, by foreigners. Though the slogan is the most prominent symbol of the Houthi movement, often displayed on placards and flags, the Houthis also display the regular flag of Yemen as a rallying symbol.

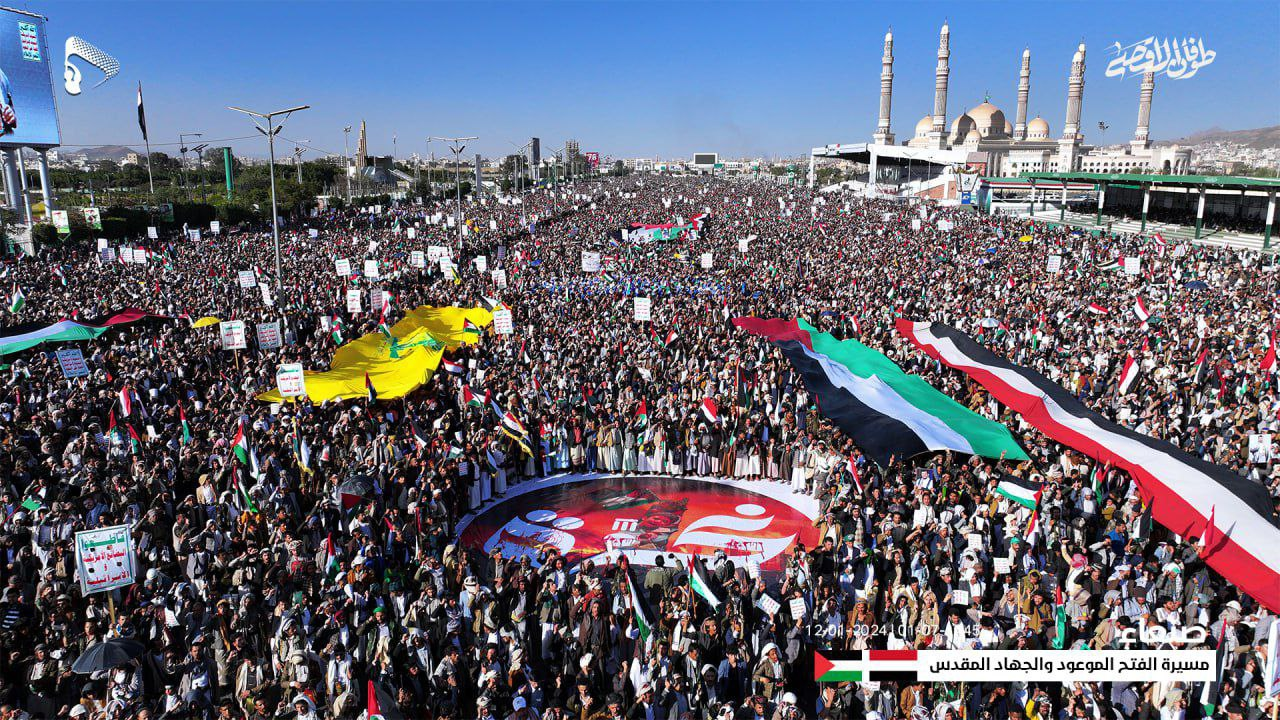
Protests in Sana'a, Yemen following the 2024 missile strikes by the US and UK

In April 2016, during UN-brokered peace talks in Kuwait, Houthi representatives gave the United States a "sincere apology" for the "Death to America" slogan, claiming that the slogan was used for "domestic consumption as a means to attract support in the streets and create a common cause between their supporters to keep them united."

During the Red Sea crisis, Houthi supporters waved the flag of Palestine every Friday during anti-Gaza genocide and anti-western attacks on Yemen demonstrations, alongside the slogan and flag of Yemen. A new Houthi slogan appeared after the group's re-designation as a terrorist organisation: "America is the mother of terrorism" set on a red background.

== See also ==
- Emblem of Yemen
- Antisemitism in Yemen
