= The Last Refuge =

2012 book by Gregory D. Johnsen

- Author: Gregory D. Johnsen
- Subject: Al-Qaeda, Yemen, terrorism
- Genre: Political science, social science
- Publisher: W. W. Norton & Company
- ISBN: 978-0-393-08242-5
- OCLC: 826855238

The Last Refuge: Yemen, Al-Qaeda, and America's War in Arabia is a 2012 book by Gregory D. Johnsen published by W. W. Norton & Company.

== Background and writing ==
Gregory D. Johnsen is a scholar at Princeton University who is an expert on Yemen and the al-Qaeda presence in the country. He came up with the idea for The Last Refuge in 2002—the writing process lasted from then until its year of its publication in 2012. Johnsen seldom outlined but did regular rewrites. Initially focused on "making really beautiful sentences", he eventually streamlined his writing to emphasize the narrative, averse to academic writing which he believes is uninteresting to average readers.

While drawing from his experience in Yemen, Johnsen detailed events through "meticulous culling of secondary sources". He drew primarily from jihadist internet forums, media produced by al-Qaeda, and reports published by Western and Arab journalists. He also interviewed diplomats and former American officials. He highlighted "martyr biographies" published by al-Qaeda, while noting the need to verify them, as well as interviews with Yemeni journalists with insider information on al-Qaeda as major sources of information.

The book is explicitly focused on events with relevance to Yemen. Major events in jihadist history considered not within that scope are summarized briefly or entirely unmentioned. Content regarding Anwar al-Awlaki is relatively light, reflecting Johnsen's belief that Awlaki's role in the group has been overstated compared to militants such as Ibrahim al-Asiri, who is given a deeper biography.
