= Farea Al-Muslimi =

- Born: Dhamar Governorate, Yemen

Farea Al-Muslimi (Arabic: فارع المسلمي) is a Yemeni writer and activist.

== Early life and education ==
Muslimi was born in the remote, mountainous village of Wessab in 1990. He lived on a family farm during his childhood years and had 19 siblings, seven of whom died due to "inadequate medical care". His father was partially literate while his mother was not. He received primary education not in a school but under a tree in the village.

In the ninth grade, he received a scholarship funded by the United States Department of State to attend the American English Center in Yemen, allowing to move out of his village for the first time to Sanaa. He later received another State Department scholarship for an exchange program allowing him to complete his senior year at Rosamond High School in Rosamond, California. He spent most of his tenure living with the family of a US Air Force member. He was enthused learning about American culture and taking part in events such as the Relay for Life and trick-or-treating on Halloween. After high school, he received a final scholarship from the State Department to study at the American University of Beirut, which he graduated from by 2013 with a bachelor's degree in public policy.

== Career ==
The Arab Spring unfolded as Muslimi was at studying the American University of Beirut. It led him to work for international media as a fixer, and his decision to pursue international affairs.

He delivered a speech before members of the U.S. Congress against U.S. drone strikes in Yemen and highlighted the price paid by innocent civilians in Yemen because of those attacks. He wrote an editorial on the situation.

Foreign Policy magazine included him in its annual list of the 100 most preeminent global thinkers in 2013. He was the second-youngest person in the world on the list (older than Malala Yousafzai).

He was the first Yemeni to deliver a speech to the U.S. Congress and the second Yemeni included in the list of Foreign Policy, following Tawakkol Karman who won the Nobel Peace Prize.
