= Sana'a Center for Strategic Studies =

Yemeni think tank

- Formation: 2014; 12 years ago
- Founded at: Sanaa, Yemen
- Type: Think tank
- Headquarters: Al Hijaz Street, near Caltex Roundabout, Al Mansoura District
- Location: Aden, Yemen
- Official language: Arabic; English
- Chairperson: Maged al-Madhaji
- Website: sanaacenter.org

The Sana'a Center for Strategic Studies is a Yemeni think tank in Aden. Founded by a group of activists in 2014, the institution conducts research on politics, economics, security, and civil and social dynamics in Yemen, while also amplifying Yemeni youth and pursuing an impact on international policy regarding Yemen. It continues to operate and conduct research locally despite the Yemeni civil war, maintaining relations with its belligerents as well as its independency. The Sana'a Center is regarded as the premiere think tank on matters related to Yemen, and is involved in the Yemeni peace process.

== Background ==
The idea for the Sana'a Center originated from a meeting in a diwan between Yemeni activists who took part in the 2011 revolution but sought further democratic and civil reform in its aftermath. They formed the Sana'a Center in 2014 to "take ownership of the narrative on Yemen" rather than act as subordinates for other organizations. Co-founder Farea al-Muslimi said: "I was frustrated with the very little content internationally about Yemen and the fact that, when there is content, it is rubbish. So, we [started] the Sana'a Center. A Yemeni platform by Yemenis, for Yemenis, and to do research on Yemen."

== Objectives ==
The Sana'a Center is a think tank which is focused on Yemen and the surrounding region. According to Robert Bosch Stiftung, the three pillars which define its work are; "knowledge production; providing a platform for Yemeni voices; and impacting policy."

In both Arabic and English, the group publishes perspectives, research, and analysis to promote a wider understanding on Yemen and the surrounding region. Its research includes works on politics, economics, security, and civil and social dynamics in Yemen, while also covering regional and international areas. Projects it produces include Yemen Review, Yemen Economic Bulletin, Yemen Exchange, and Yemen Gulf Exchange.

A key value of the Sana'a Center is to emphasize the perspectives of young people as well as women in Yemen. It seek to challenge misconceptions about Yemen in the Western world and narratives driven by parties involved in the Yemeni civil war, particularly that young people are fueling the conflict when in reality they have little interest in it. The Sana'a Center's works explore Yemen's diversity and complexity, perspectives from locals, and issues faced by minorities.

Part of our agenda is to influence decision-making on Yemen. The Yemeni government or the Saudis spend $2 million to try and influence decision-making through [public relations campaigns]. So, okay, I'll spend two megabytes on the internet to do the same. We are more powerful in D.C. than Yemeni diplomatic missions. Because we are independent. Diplomats come to us.

— Farea Al-Muslimi, co-founder

Sana'a Center researcher Waleed Alhariri discussing a report of his at Chatham House

Part of the Sana'a Center's goal is to influence policy regarding Yemen on a local, regional, and international level. It has a large presence within the international community, and its reports and researchers have been quoted by international media outlets. It also regularly provides consulting services to local and international stakeholders. Muslimi said its independence nets it more influence in policymaking circles abroad compared to official Yemeni and Saudi lobbying efforts along with some friction. Yemeni journalist Afrah Nasser corroborated this, claiming "the Sana'a Center does what the foreign ministry failed to do."

== Operations ==
Originally based in the capital Sanaa before moving its headquarters to Aden, the Sana'a Center has been noted for continuing to operate in Yemen despite the civil war. Much of its research is conducted on the ground in Yemen, where it maintains a large network and works to ensure safety for contributors. Also employed are non-resident scholars described by Muslimi as "our ambassadors to the world."

While retaining cordial relations with the major belligerents of the Yemeni civil war and connections to many figures and stakeholders, the Sana'a Center maintains a neutral and independent position on the conflict. According to Just Security, it "has thus maintained a unique positioning and ability to work throughout Yemen and beyond, distinguishing itself as an emerging leader in Yemen-related research and analysis." The Peace Research Institute Oslo regarded the Sana'a Center's research as "authoritative", while the Middle East Institute referred to it as "Yemen's premier think-tank".

Several of the Sana'a Center's programs are implemented through funding from the European Union, the Swiss Agency for Development and Cooperation, the Foreign, Commonwealth and Development Office, and the foreign ministries of the Netherlands, Norway, and Sweden. Muslimi served as its first chairperson from 2014 until 2022. Fellow co-founder Maged al-Madhaji has succeeded him since then.

== Peace programs ==
The Sana'a Center is involved in multiple peace processes concerning Yemen. Bottom-up peacebuilding in Yemen—solving issues at a local level before expanding scope—is regarded as a philosophy of theirs. It facilitates the Yemen Peace Forum, in which Yemeni youth and civil society actors discuss current affairs. The goal of the forum is to help Yemenis make an impact on their own community. Also organized by the Sana'a Center is the Yemen International Forum, a track II platform for peace dialogue which assembles officials and figures from the civil war's belligerents, tribes, civil society and international mediators, parallel to official negotiations.
