= Bernard Haykel =

American historian (born 1968)

Bernard Haykel (born 1968) is an American scholar of Islamic studies and Middle Eastern politics specializing in the intellectual, political, and social history of the Arabian Peninsula, particularly Saudi Arabia and Yemen. He is Professor of Near Eastern Studies at Princeton University and the former director of the Institute for the Transregional Study of the Contemporary Middle East, North Africa, and Central Asia (2007-2023). Haykel is widely regarded as a leading authority on Salafism, Islamic political movements, and Gulf regional politics, and has frequently advised policymakers and international institutions on Middle Eastern affairs.

He has been described as "the foremost secular authority on the Islamic State’s ideology" by journalist Graeme C.A. Wood.

== Early life ==
Haykel received a Bachelor of Science in International Politics from Georgetown University. He subsequently pursued graduate study at University of Oxford, earning the degrees of Master of Arts (Modern History), Master of Philosophy (Modern Middle East Studies), and Doctor of Philosophy in Oriental Studies in 1998. During 1992–1993, he held a Fulbright Fellowship in Yemen, where he conducted field research on Islamic legal and political traditions.

== Career ==
Following completion of his doctorate, Haykel held a postdoctoral research fellowship (Prize Fellowship) in Islamic Studies at Magdalen College, Oxford. In 1998, he joined New York University as Assistant Professor and later Associate Professor of Middle Eastern and Islamic Studies, where he taught Islamic intellectual history and regional politics. In 2007, he joined Princeton University as Professor of Near Eastern Studies.

He also became Director of the Institute for the Transregional Study of the Contemporary Middle East, North Africa, and Central Asia, where he expanded interdisciplinary research on the modern Middle East. He also directed Princeton’s Project on Oil and Energy in the Middle East. In 2023, he was appointed Nelson Mandela Chair in Afro-Asian Studies, a visiting professorship at Mahatma Gandhi University in India. In 2024, Haykel was inducted as a member of the American Academy of Sciences and Letters.

== Scholarly works ==
Haykel’s scholarship centers on Islamic intellectual history, Salafism, Islamic law, and the political transformation of the Arabian Peninsula. His first major monograph, Revival and Reform in Islam: The Legacy of Muhammad al-Shawkani (2003), is a study of the Yemeni scholar Muhammad al-Shawkani and examines the intellectual foundations of Islamic reformism, arguing that reformist thought emerged through reinterpretations of legal authority rather than simple opposition to tradition. The book established Haykel as authority on Islamic legal and theological history.

His co-edited volume Saudi Arabia in Transition (2015), analyzes social, political, economic, and religious transformations within Saudi Arabia during a period of rapid institutional change. The work examines state modernization, changing clerical authority, youth politics, and the pressures of economic diversification, becoming a key reference on the evolution of the modern Saudi state.

Haykel has also produced numerous journal articles on Salafi doctrine, Islamic revivalist movements, sectarian politics, and Gulf regional strategy. His studies frequently combine textual analysis of Islamic legal traditions with contemporary political developments, linking classical religious scholarship to present-day governance and ideological contestation in the Middle East.

His forthcoming book, The Realm: MBS and the Transformation of Saudi Arabia, is a study of modern Saudi Arabian political history and examines the political restructuring of the kingdom under Crown Prince Mohammed bin Salman. The work analyzes the centralization of power, economic reform, nationalism, and the reconfiguration of state-religious relations under Vision 2030, situating these changes within broader historical patterns of Saudi state formation and regional geopolitics.

== Policy work ==
Haykel has regularly advised governments, think tanks, financial institutions, and international organizations on Middle Eastern political developments, particularly concerning Gulf monarchies, Islamist movements, and regional security. He has served as a nonresident senior fellow at Hudson Institute and until December 2025 sat on the board of the Arab Gulf States Institute in Washington. He has also led policy-oriented academic initiatives, including Princeton’s Project on Oil and Energy in the Middle East and a multi-year research initiative on Muslim communities in India funded by the Henry Luce Foundation.

== Views and Opinions ==
Haykel’s public commentary frequently addresses Saudi political reform, Islamist ideology, and regional strategic competition involving Iran, Saudi Arabia, and the United States. He has argued that contemporary Salafism cannot be understood solely through security frameworks and must instead be analyzed through historical theology and institutional development. On Saudi Arabia, he has characterized Crown Prince Mohammed bin Salman as pursuing a pragmatic nationalist project aimed at redefining state legitimacy through modernization and centralization rather than traditional religious authority. Regarding Iran, he has emphasized the regime’s strategic caution despite ideological assertiveness, often describing its regional posture as balancing revolutionary ambition with state survival calculations.

Haykel appears frequently in print and broadcast media. These include interviews and articles in the Wall Street Journal, PBS, NPR, the New York Times, Project Syndicate, Al Arabia, Al Jazeera, the New Yorker, and the BBC among others.

== Awards and Honors ==
- Fulbright Fellowship for research in Yemen (1992–1993)
- Prize Fellowship, Magdalen College, Oxford (1995-1998)
- Carnegie Corporation Fellowship (2005)
- John Simon Guggenheim Memorial Foundation Fellowship (2010)
- Old Dominion Professorship, Princeton University (2015)
- Henry Luce Foundation Research Grant (2020)
- Nelson Mandela Chair in Afro-Asian Studies (2023)
- Election to the American Academy of Sciences and Letters (2024)

== Selected publications ==
- Haykel, Bernard. (2003). Revival and reform in Islam: The legacy of Muhammad al-Shawkani. Cambridge University Press
- Haykel, Bernard. (2009). On the nature of Salafi thought and action. In R. Meijer (Ed.), Global Salafism: Islam’s new religious movement (pp. 33–57). Hurst
- Haykel, Bernard. (2010). Western Arabia and Yemen during the Ottoman period. In The New Cambridge History of Islam (Vol. 2, pp. 436–464). Cambridge University Press
- Haykel, Bernard. (2011). Al-Qaʿida and Shiism. In A. Moghadam & B. Fishman (Eds.), Fault lines in global jihad (pp. 200–223). Routledge
- Haykel, Bernard. (2012). What makes a madhhab a madhhab: Zaydi debates on the structure of legal authority. Arabica, 59(1), 71–99
- Haykel, Bernard. (2013). The political failure of Islamic law. Yale Law School Occasional Paper Series
- Haykel, Bernard. (2013). Introduction. In The expansion of Wahhabi power in Arabia, 1798–1932: British documentary records. Cambridge Archive Editions
- Haykel, Bernard. (2014). Oil in Saudi Arabia’s culture and politics: From tribal poets to al-Qaeda’s ideologues. In B. Haykel, T. Hegghammer, & S. Lacroix (Eds.), Saudi Arabia in transition (pp. 63–89). Cambridge University Press
- Haykel, Bernard. “ISIS and Al Qaeda: What are They Thinking? Understanding the Adversary,” in The Annals of the American Academy of Political and Social Science, 2016.
- Haykel, Bernard. “The History and Ideology of the Islamic State,” in Blind Spot: America’s Response to Radicalism in the Middle East, The Aspen Institute, 2016.
- Haykel, Bernard. “The Economic Transformation of the Gulf,” in The Gulf in History, John Peterson (ed.), London: Bloomsbury, 2016.
- Haykel, Bernard. “Poetry in Jihadi Culture,” in Jihadi Culture: the Art and Social Practices of Militant Islamists, (Thomas Hegghammer, ed.), Cambridge University Press, 2017.
- Haykel, Bernard. “On the Nature of the Huthi Movement’s Religious and Political Authority and its Relationship to Zaydism,” in The Huthis in Yemen, Abdallah Hamid al-Din (ed.). I. B. Tauris, 2022.
- Haykel, Bernard. Muḥammad b. ‘Alī al-Shawkānī and his Qur’anic commentary al-Fatḥ al-qadīr in Handbook of Qur’ānic Hermeneutics, vol. 4, Georges Tamer (ed.), Walter de Gruyter, 2023.
