= Arab Gulf States Institute =

American-based think tank

- Established: 2015
- Chairman: C. David Welch
- Budget: Revenue: $3,763,601; Expenses: $2,280,393 (FYE December 2015)
- Address: 1150 18th St; NW Washington, D.C. 20036 U.S.
- Website: www.agsi.org

The Arab Gulf States Institute is a Washington, D.C.-based think tank dedicated to covering the "social, economic, and political diversity of the Arab countries in the Persian Gulf region." Ambassador C. David Welch is Chair of the Board of Directors. Ambassador Frank G. Wisner was Chairman of the Board of the Institute.

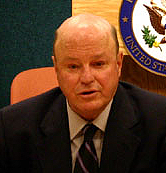
Frank G. Wisner, Former Chair of the Board

Several contributors produce long and short-term strategic papers on issues concerning the Gulf states, and their relationship with the United States and each other. The Institute publishes a weekly newsletter called The Dhow that contains research, analysis, and commentary.
