= Battle of Daraa (1918) =

Battle during the Arab Revolt

- Part of the Arab Revolt and the Middle Eastern theatre of World War I
Date	13–27 September 1918
Location	Daraa, Syria
Result	Allied victory

Belligerents
Kingdom of Hejaz; British Empire; France	Ottoman Empire; Germany

Commanders and leaders
Sherif Nasir; Auda Abu Tayi; Nuri al-Said; Nuri al-Shaalan; T. E. Lawrence	

The Battle of Daraa took place in 1918 in Daraa, Syria, during the Arab Revolt in World War I.

== Background ==
The Arab Northern Army advanced their base of operations from al-Quweira to al-Azraq to prepare for an attack on the city of Daraa. A meeting was held in Abu al-Lasan, led by Prince Faisal with Arab and British officers, to plan the division of attacking troops into two main groups. The first group, commanded by Prince Zeid bin Hussein and Jaafar al-Askari, was stationed in Abu al-Lasan and Khirbet es-Samra. Their mission was to attack Ottoman forces in Ma'an and along the Hejaz railway section extending to Amman, while also dispatching a column to Madaba. The second group, consisting of regular and irregular troops under Sherif Nasir, Auda Abu Tayi, Nuri al-Said, and Nuri al-Shaalan, along with an Arab field medical unit, focused on attacking the sections of the Hejaz railway north of al-Azraq. Concurrently, Prince Faisal tasked Sherif Nasir and Nasib al-Bakri with recruiting Arab tribes in Wadi Sirhan, Hauran, and Jabal al-Druze to bolster his forces.

== Battle ==
The operations around Daraa began on 13 September 1918. Over the next two days, Arab forces successfully destroyed sections of the railway at Jaber and Nasib. On 16 September, forces led by T. E. Lawrence and al-Said attacked the railway junction at Daraa to disrupt Ottoman lines of communication and distract the Yildirim headquarters. Lawrence's initial forces included Camel Corps units, Gurkha machine gunners, British and Australian armoured cars, and French mountain artillery. These were joined by up to 3,000 Ruwallah and Howeitat tribesmen under renowned chiefs such as Abu Tayi and al-Shaalan. Meanwhile, the Ottomans sent reinforcements from Afula to defend Daraa.

On 17 September, a regular force led by al-Said, supported by irregular troops and volunteers from Hejaz and Hauran, attacked Tell Arar north of Daraa despite facing German air raids. Al-Said later led a force of 350 fighters, joined by Bedouins under Sherif Nasir and a company of camel riders, along with two French mountain guns, to attack Muzayrib. They succeeded in sabotaging a 3 kilometres (1.9 mi) section of the railway, severing Daraa's connection to Palestine and Damascus. However, they failed to destroy the station at Tell Shihab due to the arrival of German-Ottoman forces securing Daraa and its surroundings. At Lawrence's urging, British aircraft began operating from makeshift landing strips at Umm al-Surab starting 22 September. Three Bristol F.2 Fighters shot down several Ottoman aircraft. The Handley Page 0/400 ferried petrol, ammunition, and spares for the fighters and two Airco DH.9s. It also bombed the Daraa airfield early on 23 September and nearby Mafraq the following night.

Arab forces remained in the area until 24 September, engaging in nightly skirmishes on trains and bridges, forcing further Ottoman retreats. On 27 September, an Arab force marched north from al-Naimah and liberated Izra, Khirbet Ghazaleh, al-Shaykh Maskin, al-Shaykh Saad, and Tell Arar, aided by local villagers from Hauran. Later that day, Ottoman forces withdrew from Daraa, with Sherif Nasir becoming the first to enter the city.

== Aftermath ==
On the day Daraa was liberated, withdrawing Turkish forces perpetrated the Tafas massacre, killing over 250 civilians in an effort to demoralize the enemy. On 1 October 1918, Allied forces captured Damascus.

== Sources ==
- Falls, Cyril (1930). Becke, A. F. (ed.). Military Operations Egypt & Palestine from June 1917 to the End of the War. Official History of the Great War Based on Official Documents by Direction of the Historical Section of the Committee of Imperial Defence. Vol. 2. London: H.M. Stationery Office. OCLC 256950972.
- Lawrence, T. E. (1926). Seven Pillars of Wisdom: A Triumph. Harmondsworth, Middlesex: Penguin Modern Classics. ISBN 0-14-001696-1.
- Mack, John E. (1998). A Prince of Our Disorder: The Life of T. E. Lawrence. Harvard University Press. ISBN 9780674704947.
- Wavell, Earl (1968). Eric William Sheppard (ed.). The Palestine Campaigns. A Short History of the British Army (4th ed.). London: Constable & Co. OCLC 35621223.
