= Sha'alan =

Coordinates: 33°31′4″N 36°17′19″E

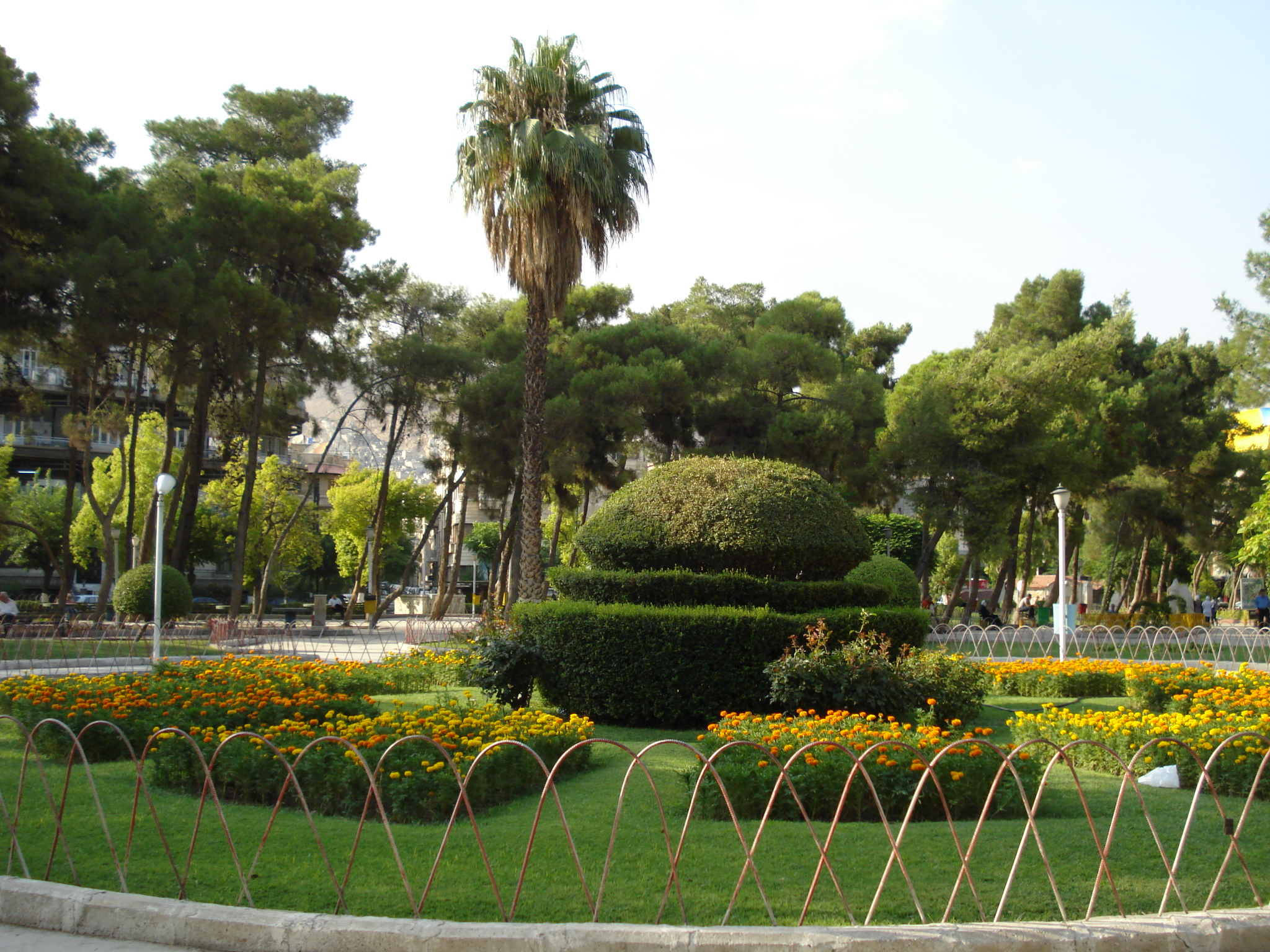
al-Subki park in Sha'alan, named after Taqi al-Din al-Subki

Sha'alan (Arabic: الشعلان) is a neighborhood of Damascus, Syria.

== History ==
The neighborhood is named after Nuri Al Shaalan, the chieftain of Ruwallah tribe who bought Yasin al-Hashimi's house in the region in 1920s, and built a mosque there. During the French Mandate, the neighborhood was inhabited by the French and Italian expats in Syria, in the vicinity of nearby Franciscan institutes.

When the Abu Nidal Organization moved its operations into Syria in the 1980s, it established its head office in Sha'alan. The organization expanded the facility so it included a prison, a technical unit that forged passports, and the Intelligence Directorate unit. Weapons were hidden in the intelligence directorate offices, under floors and in walls. The facility included CCTV equipment to monitor area streets. The office included a press used for creating magazines and pamphlets. It also included a travel agency used for booking airline tickets, a news agency used as a front for the group's intelligence gathering plans, and an estate agency used to care for the organization's real estate.
