= Nawwaf bin Nuri Al Sha'alan =

Arabian tribal chief (1883–1921)

Nawwaf bin Nuri Al Sha'alan نواف بن نوري الشعلان
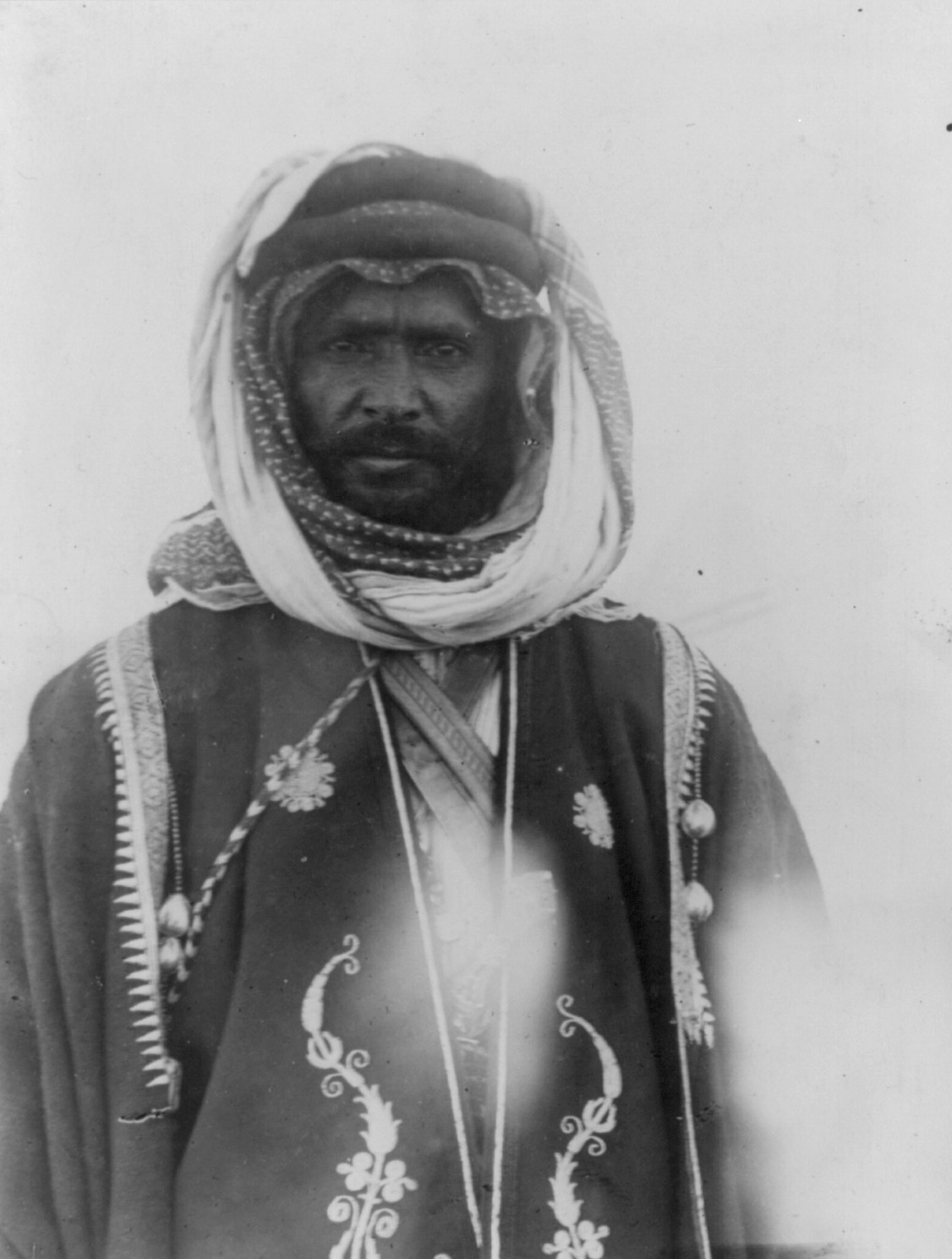
- Emir of Al Jawf: 1909–1919
- Born: 1883
- Died: 1921 (aged 37–38); Al-Qaryatayn, Syria
- Issue: List: Prince Sultan, governor of Al Jawf; Prince Fawwaz, Sheikh of the Ruwallah; Prince Nawash; Prince Nayef; Princess Hessa; Princess Fawza, wife of King Saud of Saudi Arabia; Princess Nouf, wife of King Abdulaziz of Saudi Arabia; Princess Tarfa
- House: Al Sha'alan
- Father: Nuri bin Hazaa Al Shalaan
- Occupation: Governor of Al Jawf

Nawwaf bin Nuri Al Sha'alan (Arabic: نواف بن نوري الشعلان, romanized: Nawwaf bin Nouri as-Shaalan; 1883–1921) was the son of the paramount chief of the Ruwallah, Nuri bin Hazaa Al Shalaan, and governor of Al Jawf from 1909 to 1921, when it was re-captured by the Emirate of Jabal Shammar. He died in 1921 and was succeeded by his young son Prince Sultan, who reconquered it in August 1921 and remained governor until Al Jawf's annexation by Ibn Saud in 1922.

== Early life ==
Nawwaf was born in 1883. He was the eldest son of Nuri bin Hazaa Al Shalaan. According to British sources, while Nawwaf was a less colourful personality than his father, he was more educated and considered by the Arab Unionist Party in Damascus to be the most advanced political thinker in the desert. Nawwaf married Jawaher bint Sattam bin Fendi Al-Fayez who is also the sister of Mithqal Pasha Al-Fayez, she gave birth to Princess Nouf and Prince Nayef. Princess Nouf would later marry King Abdulaziz of Saudi Arabia and had Princes Thamir, Mashhour, and Mamdouh. Mashhour's daughter is the wife of Crown Prince Mohammed bin Salman.

== Career ==
Al Jawf was retrieved by Sheikh Faisal Al Sha'alan against the Al Rashid family. The Al Sha’alan experienced internal conflicts for the rule within the family, which resulted on losing the rule upon Al Jawf. It was captured by Muhammad bin Abdullah Al Rashid in the 1860s. In 1889, Prince Sattam Al Shalaan captured Al Jawf, then it was recaptured again by Al Rashid Family after their agreements with the Ottomans. Al Jawf remained in Rashidi hands until a seizure of the territory by a rebellious member of the Al Rashid family in 1905, Sultan bin Hamoud Al Rashid. This followed with the assassination of reigning emir Mutaib bin Abdulaziz Al Rashid in December 1906 by Sultan and his brothers, and Sultan's subsequent accession to the throne. Sultan was deposed by his brother Saud bin Hamoud Al Rashid in July 1907, who ruled until September 1908, when he was overthrown by Hamoud bin Sabhan Al Sabhan and the surviving brother of the assassinated Emir, Saud bin Abdulaziz Al Rashid was crowned.

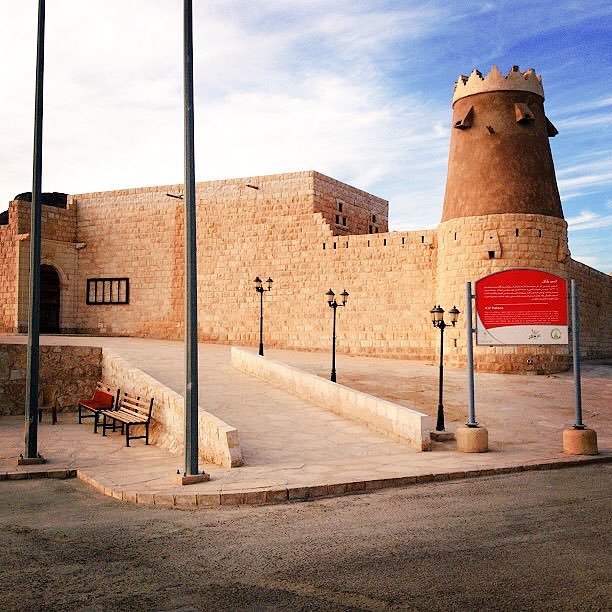
Nawwaf's palace in Kaf

After this weakening of the Emirate of Ha'il, in February 1909, Nawwaf came with 35 slave soldiers and annexed the territory of Al Jawf. He was subsequently appointed the governor by his father, the Sheikh Nuri Al Sha'alan. Nawwaf appointed his slave Amer Al-Mushwarib as his deputy governor, who proved to be a vastly unpopular leader. Amer was assassinated by locals who called on Ibn Rashid to reoccupy during Prince Nawwaf Al Shalan’s absence in 1919.

Nawwaf built two palaces. One was a palace in Kaf in Qurayyat, which he was busy building for several years until it was finished in 1918, which still stands today. He used it as a center for his rule during the completion of construction operations. As for the other, it was located in Sakakah and has since disintegrated.

== Death ==
Nawwaf died prematurely from smallpox in Syria during the summer of 1921.
