= Battle of Aqaba =

1917 battle during the Arab Revolt of World War I

- Part of the Arab Revolt on the Middle Eastern theatre of the First World War
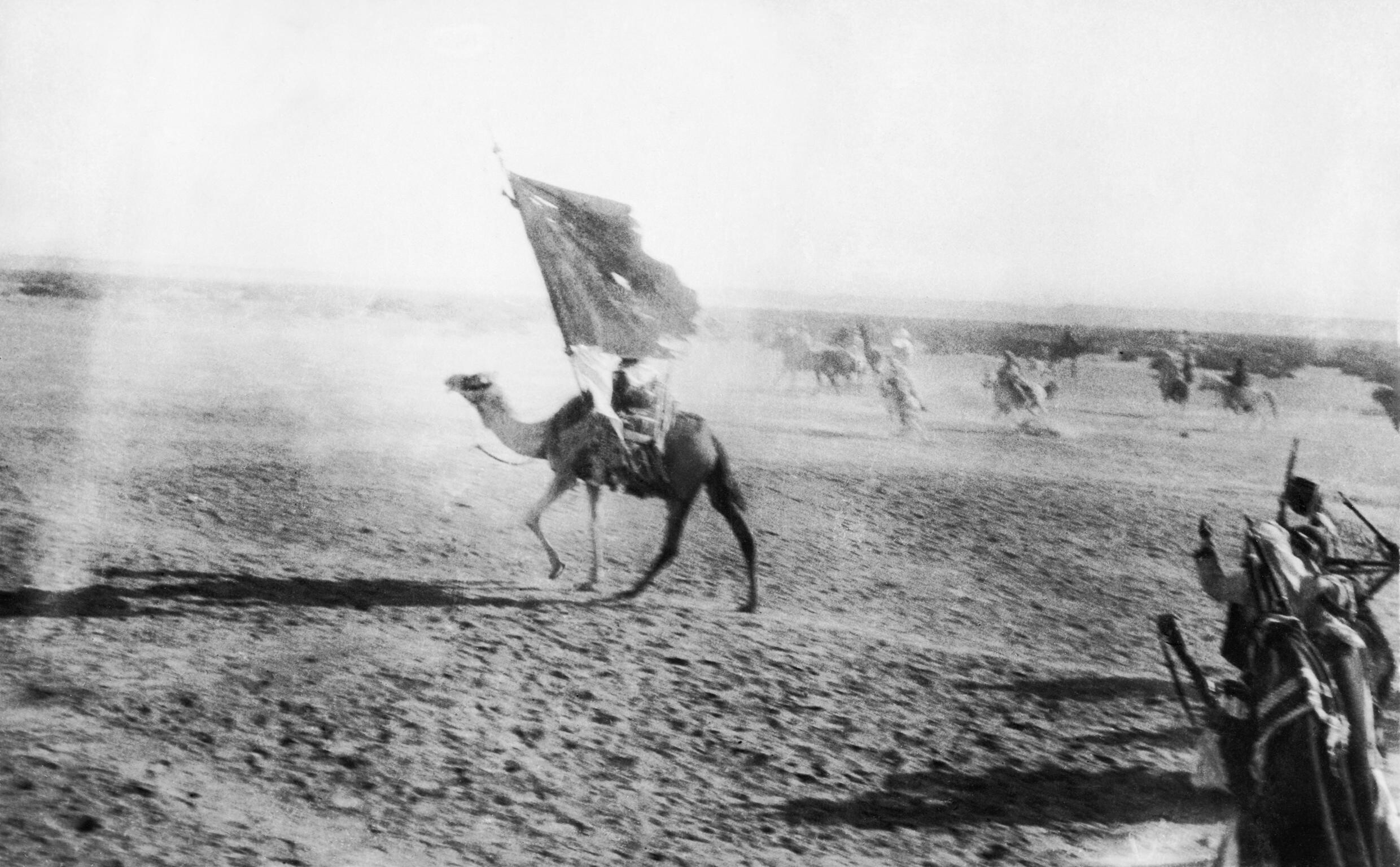
- A flag bearer mounted on a dromedary leading the triumphal entry into Aqaba
Date	6 July 1917
Location	Aqaba, Jordan
Result	Arab victory
Territorial changes	Arabs gain control of Aqaba

Belligerents
(Arab Revolt) Kingdom of Hejaz (United Kingdom of Great Britain and Ireland) United Kingdom	Ottoman Empire

Commanders and leaders
(Arab Revolt) Auda Abu Tayi (Arab Revolt) Sherif Nasir (United Kingdom of Great Britain and Ireland) T. E. Lawrence	Unknown

Strength
(Arab Revolt) 5,000 men (United Kingdom of Great Britain and Ireland) Naval assistance	(Ottoman Empire) Garrison: 550 men (Ottoman Empire) One infantry battalion (approximately 450 men)

Casualties and losses
2 killed Unknown wounded	300 killed and wounded 700 captured

The Battle of Aqaba was fought for the Red Sea port of Aqaba (now in Jordan) during the Arab Revolt of World War I. The attacking forces, led by Sherif Nasir and Auda abu Tayi and advised by T. E. Lawrence ("Lawrence of Arabia"), were victorious over the Ottoman Empire defenders.

== Background ==
When the Ottoman Empire entered World War I, British warships bombarded the 100 man Ottoman fort at Aqaba on November 1, 1914.

Gilbert Clayton had already told Lawrence, "The move to Aqaba on the part of Feisal is not at present desirable..." This was due to the McMahon-Hussein Correspondence being superseded by the Sykes-Picot Agreement. Lawrence, however, decided to go his own way, without orders. Lawrence called it a private venture, void of British support, since "Feisal provided money, camels, stores and explosives."

The 600-mile (970 km) desert journey was led by Sherif Nasir, while Lawrence was accompanied by Nesib el-Bekri and Auda Abu Tayi, leader of the northern Howeitat tribe of Bedouin. Total strength on 9 May 1917, when they embarked, was 45 Howeitat and Ageyl camel men.

Aqaba was surrounded by mountains north and east, and connected to the interior by Wadi Itm. The long and narrow gorge could be used by the Ottomans to bottle up any British invasion by sea, though it did not stop the Royal Navy from bombarding the site. By 1917, the Ottoman garrison had grown to 300 – mainly Ottoman-Arab gendarmerie – up from 100 in 1914. According to Neil Faulkner, "The British high command had long been anxious about Aqaba." The British feared that an Ottoman Aqaba would threaten Archibald Murray's flank, or Ottoman raids could develop into the Sinai, or that it could be used as a base for German submarines in the Red Sea.

According to T.E. Lawrence, "The Arabs needed Akaba: firstly, to extend their front, which was their tactical principle; and, secondly, to link up with the British." Lawrence also says, "I was working out with Auda abu Tayi a march to the Howeitat in their spring pastures of the Syrian desert. From them we might raise a mobile camel force, and rush Akaba from the eastward without guns or machine-guns. The eastern was the unguarded side, the line of least resistance, the easiest for us."

== Battle and campaign ==
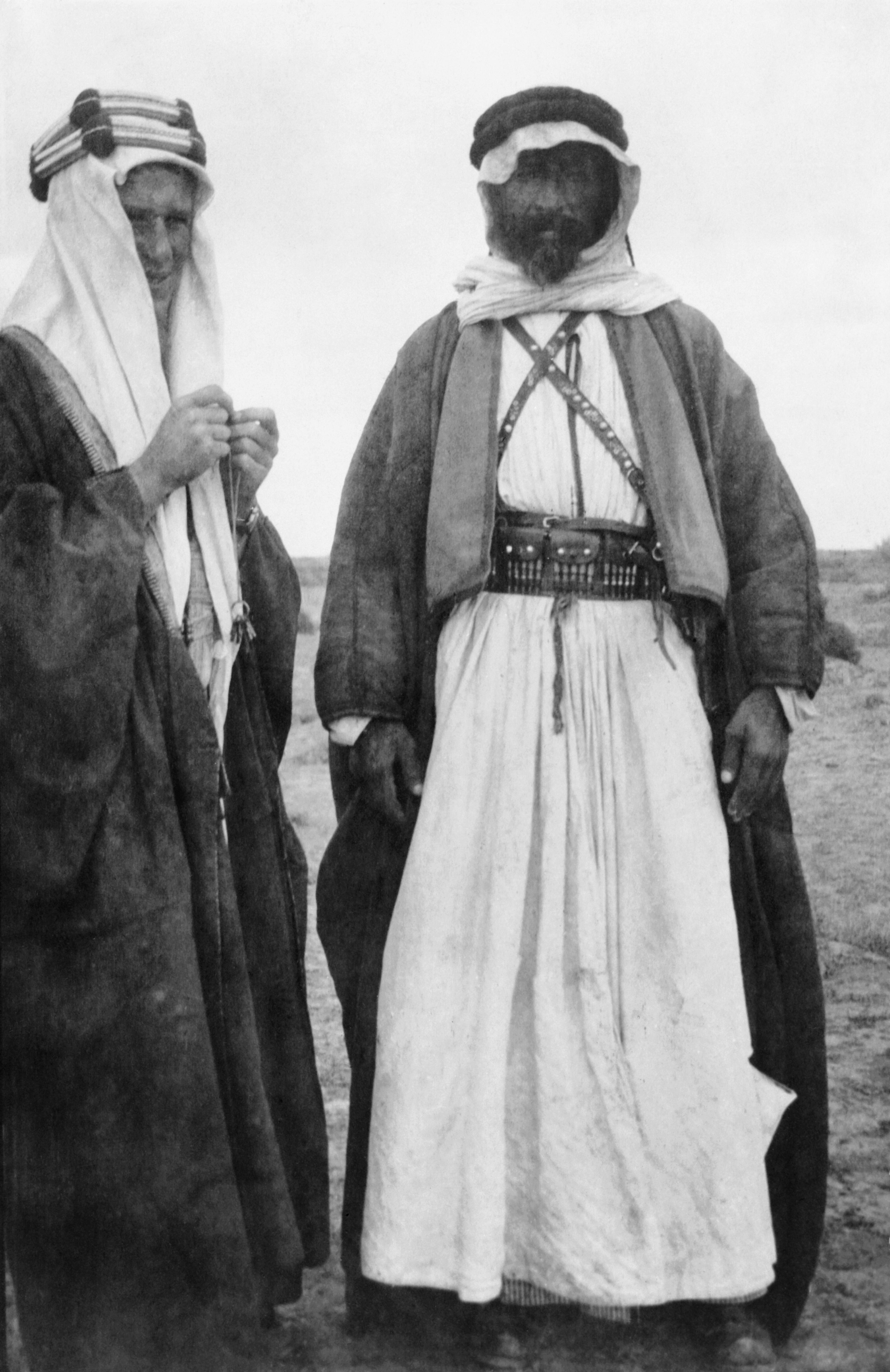
Auda abu Tayi with T. E. Lawrence, 1917

=== Prelude ===
Newcombe and Lawrence contrived to deceive the Turkish army that their objective was an attack on Damascus and Aleppo, drawing attention away from their real goal of Aqaba. The expedition started moving towards Aqaba in May. They lost three men to attacks by snakes in the Wadi Sirhan region, while Nuri al-Shaalan was paid 6,000 pounds sterling (equivalent to £360,000 in 2025) in gold for the use of Wadi Sirhan as a base. While in Bair, Lawrence and Auda decided to attack the rail line in the area of Daraa, to convince the Turks the main Arab force was at Azrak in Sirhan. Finding no suitable targets that far north, Lawrence and Zaal ended up attacking the Atwi station south of Amman, before returning to Bair.

=== Aba al Lasan and Aqaba ===
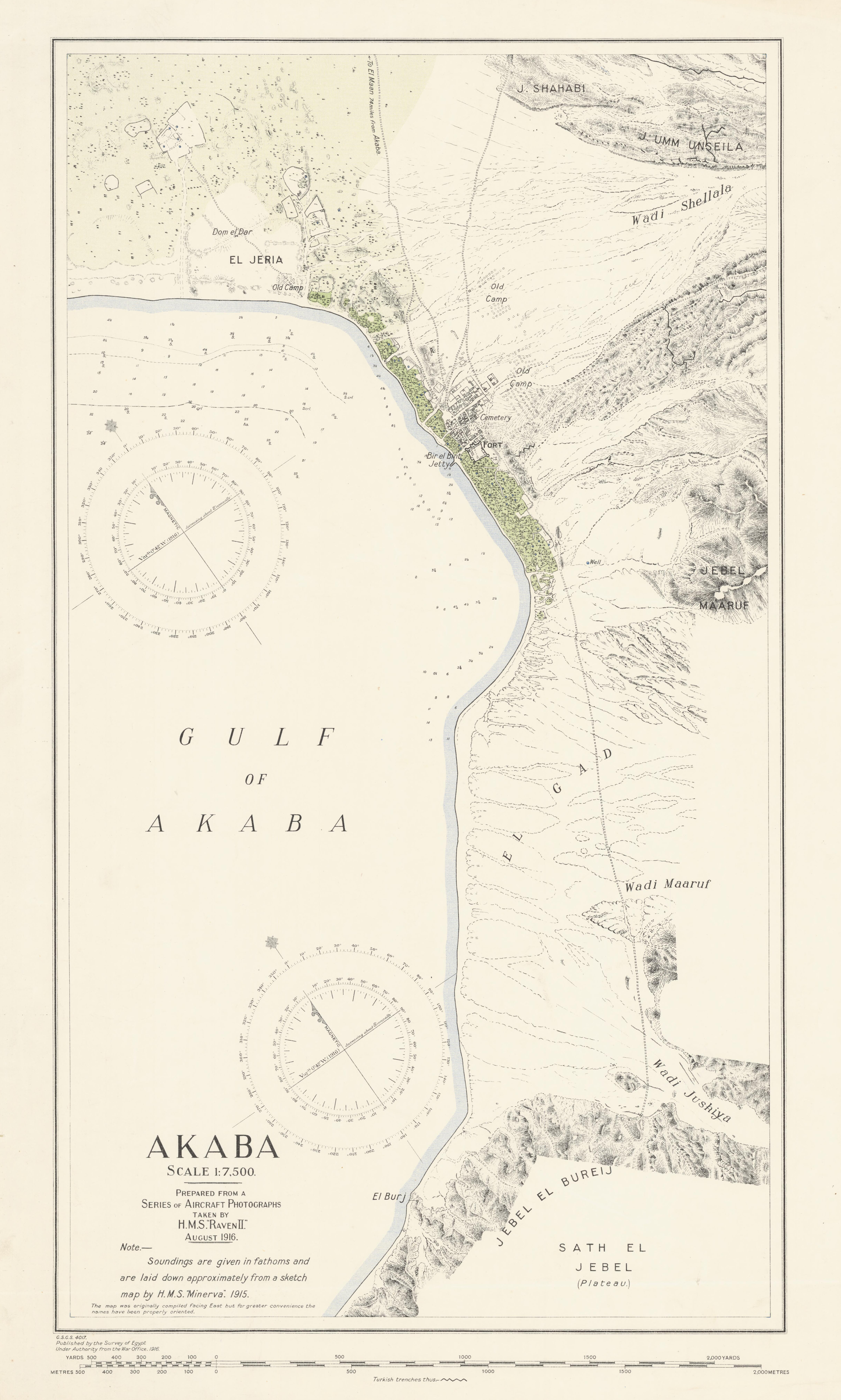
Map of Aqaba (1916)

Three Howeitat clans on Nagb el Shtar, the Dhumaniyeh, the Darausha, and the Dhiabat, aided the effort to secure the pass of Aba el Lissan, along the Maan–Aqaba road. The Dhumaniyeh attacked the Fuweilah blockhouse at the pass while the Arab force under Auda and Lawrence attacked the Ghadir el Haj garrison along the rail line south of Maan, destroying ten bridges. However, the Dhumaniyeh were unable to keep control of the pass when a Turkish relief battalion under Niaz Bey arrived, occupying Aba el Lissan.

Auda personally led a charge of 50 horsemen against the Turkish troops on 2 July, while 400 camelmen under Nasir and Lawrence charged into their flank. The result was 300 Turkish casualties and only 160 prisoners, while the Arabs lost two dead. Lawrence was nearly killed in the action after he accidentally shot his camel in the head with his pistol. Auda was hit by six bullets, which destroyed his field glasses, holster, and scabbard; but left him unharmed.

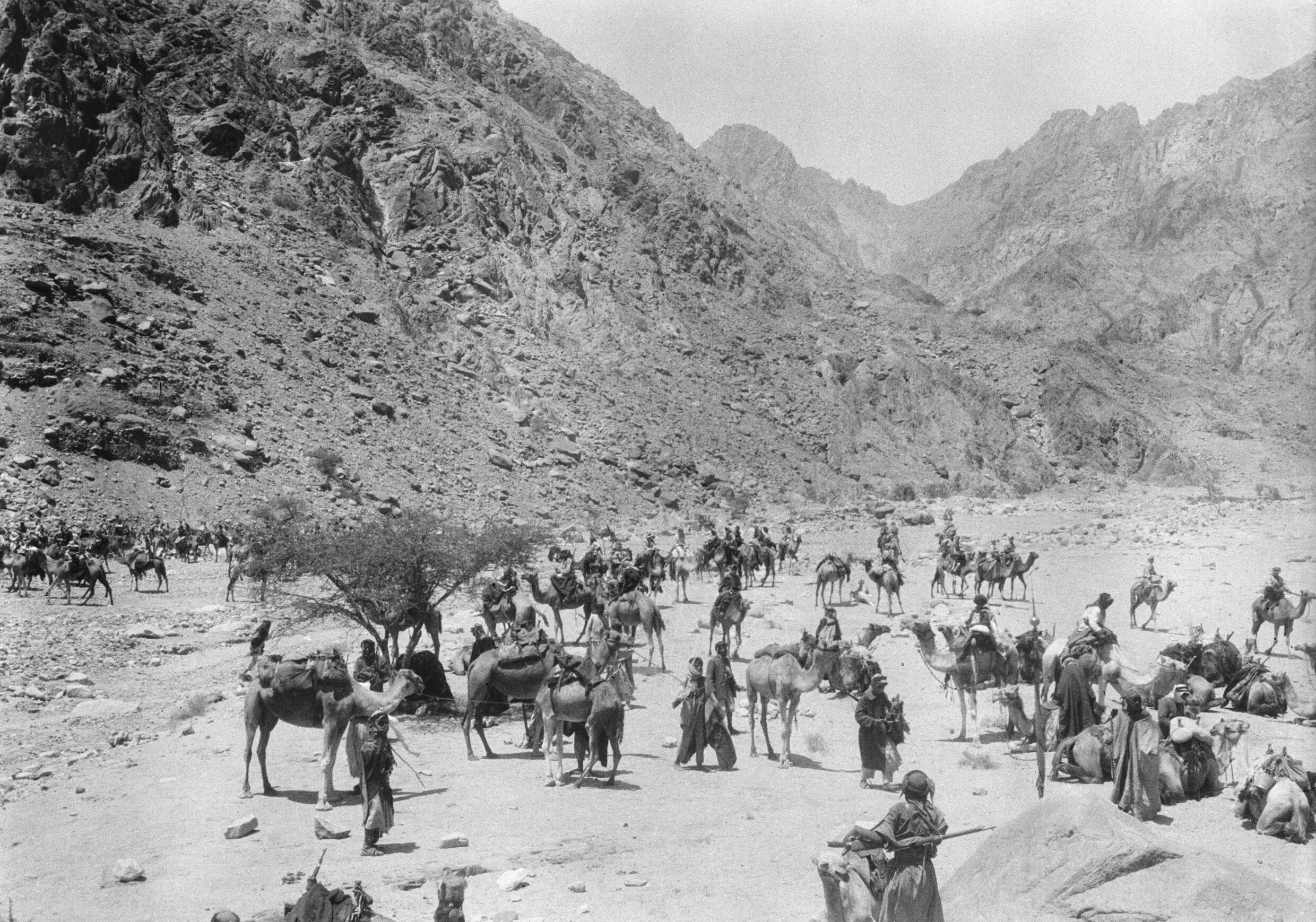
Discussing surrender terms, 5 July

Three more Turkish posts lay ahead on the way to Aqaba: Guweira, Kethera, and Khadra. Guweira was captured by Sheikh ibn Jad by the time Auda and Lawrence arrived, and the 120 soldiers in that Turkish garrison had become prisoners. Kethira was taken on the night of 4 July, aided by a lunar eclipse. Khadra, at the mouth of the Itm, and its 300-man garrison surrendered on the 6th. Four miles (6.4 km) onward, Aqaba and the sea now lay open.

== Aftermath ==
The Arab force had swelled to 2,000 Howeitat by the end of the engagement, and they had taken 700 prisoners, including 42 officers. Auda established an advance post at Guweira with 600 of his clan, which they held for the next month and a half, enough time for the gain of Aqaba to be consolidated, even though the Ottomans were able to retake Abu al-Lissan and Fuweilah. Arab outposts were also established at Nabathean Petra, Delagha, and Batra, along the Maan highlands.

Lawrence, accompanied by eight others, traveled 160 miles (260 km) across the Sinai Peninsula via the Mitla Pass to Suez, in 49 hours. At Ismailia Station, Lawrence convinced Burmester and Admiral Wemyss to send HMIS Dufferin to Aqaba with food, bringing back the prisoners on the return trip. Lawrence then took a train to Cairo. In Cairo, Lawrence reported to Clayton and then Allenby, from whom Lawrence requested arms, supplies, an immediate £16,000 in gold to pay debts incurred, and a further 200,000 sovereigns to support his plans to threaten communications with Jerusalem. Allenby promised Lawrence to do what he could, and subsequently told Robertson, "...even the partial success of Captain Lawrence's scheme would seriously disorganise Turkish railway communications south of Aleppo, while its complete success would destroy effectively his only main artery of communication..."

Aqaba became a major Royal Navy depot, supplying and transporting Feisal's forces upon his arrival on 23 August, as HMS Euryalus and then HMS Humber guarded the port. A landing strip was built at Kuntilla; and by August 4 the Royal Flying Corps was bombing Maan, Abu al-Lissan, and Fuweilah, supplementing continued attacks by Auda on the Hejaz railway. According to Lawrence, "In the next four months our experts from Akaba destroyed seventeen locomotives. Traveling became an uncertain terror for the enemy."

== Popular culture ==
The campaign and battle was depicted in the film Lawrence of Arabia, albeit with some creative liberties taken and events compressed.

The battle was reenacted by Major Crum in the video game Wallace & Gromit's Grand Adventures episode 2: The Last Resort.

== Bibliography ==
Notes

References

- Lawrence, T.E. (1926). Seven Pillars of Wisdom: a Triumph. Doubleday, Doran & company, inc. - Total pages: 672
- Rogan, Eugene (10 March 2015). The Fall of the Ottomans:The Great War in the Middle East. Basic Books. ISBN 9780465056699. - Total pages: 512
- Thomas, Lowell (2017). With Lawrence in Arabia. Skyhorse Publishing, Inc. ISBN 978-1510715738. - Total pages: 428
- Tucker, Spencer C. (2005). World War I: Encyclopedia, Band 1. ABC-CLIO. ISBN 978-1851094202. - Total pages: 1661
- Wilson, Jeremy (1992). Lawrence of Arabia: The Authorized Biography of T.E. Lawrence. Collier Books. ISBN 978-0020826620. - Total pages: 453
