= Nuri bin Hazaa Al Shalaan =

Arabian tribal chief (1847–1942)

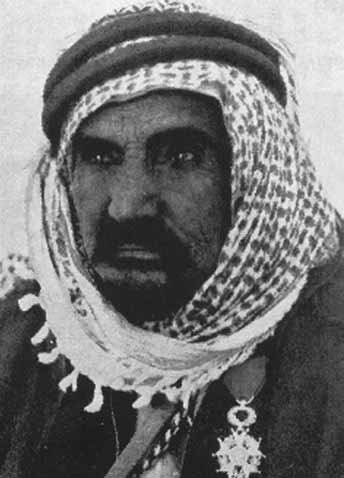
- Nuri Al Shalaan (photo by Carl Raswan in 1927)

Emir of the Ruwallah tribe
- In office: 1904–1942
- Predecessor: Fahd bin Hazaa Al Shalaan
- Successor: Fawwaz bin Nawwaf Al Shalaan
- Born: 1847
- Died: 1 July 1942 (aged 94–95); Damascus, Syria
- Burial: Adra, Syria
- Issue: Nawwaf bin Nuri Al Sha'alan
- House: Al Shalaan
- Father: Hazaa Al Shalaan
- Occupation: Prince of the Ruwalla tribe
- Military career
- Allegiance: Kingdom of Hejaz
- Branch: Sharifian Army
- Conflicts: Arab Revolt; Battle of Megiddo; Battle of Daraa; Capture of Damascus; Great Syrian Revolt

Nuri bin Hazaa Al Shalaan (Arabic: نوري بن هزاع الشعلان, romanized: Nuri ibn Hazaa as-Shaalan; 1847–1942) was the Prince of Ruwallah tribe settled in northern Arabia and the Syrian Desert. He headed the tribe between 1904 and 1942 and developed alliances with various ruling forces in the region.

== Early life ==
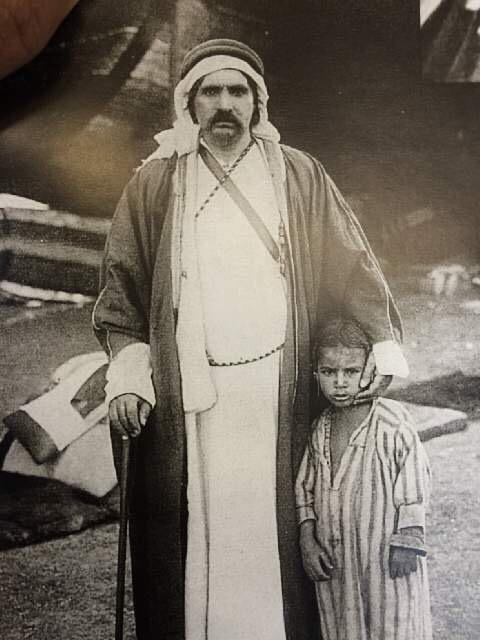
Al Shalaan with his son Nawaf in 1899

Al Shalaan was born in 1847 as one of the children of the Emir of the Ruwallah tribe. The tribe belonged to the Anizah Confederation. They settled in Syria in late 18th century, due to the Wahhabi attacks.

== Tribal chieftaincy and activities ==
After the death of his father, Al Shalaan's brother Sattam succeeded him as the Emir of the Ruwallah tribe. Nuri's brother was killed in 1904, then he inherited the rule becoming the ruler of the tribe. He occupied Al Jawf region in 1909 that had been under the control of Al Rashid forces. Following this he was called Emir of Jawf. He had good relations with the Ottomans, and their alliance continued until 1910 when he was exiled by the Ottomans to Spain because of his clash with an Ottoman official, as he declined to join Sami Pasha al-Farouqi's campaign against the Hauran Druze Rebellion. His exile ended in 1916 and he returned to Damascus.

In that period, the Ruwallah tribe was one of the most influential nomadic groups in the Syrian Badiya and northern saudi, with loose encampments that could spread over hundreds of kilometres. Al Shalaan was responsible for the management of water and pastoral resources across these encampments and maintaining peace amongst the various factions within the tribal confederacy.

Then Al Shalaan became an ally of the Hashemites as a result of the Allies' influence, particularly of T. E. Lawrence, and was financially assisted by Emir Faisal, son of Sherif Hussein. Al Shalaan first rejected the offer of Emir Faisal to join the Arab revolt against the Ottomans, and his meeting with Lawrence in July 1917 was not fruitful. Because he was suspicious of the Sykes–Picot Agreement and the British. Al Shalaan accepted the offer in September 1917 only after the arrest of his son, Fawwaz.

Al Shalaan made significant efforts in the occupation of Daraa and capture of Damascus by the Hashemite forces. His forces were the most significant Arab armed units which entered Damascus on 1 October 1918. However, his alliance with Emir Faisal did not last long since he began to support the occupying French forces from July 1920 and was paid by them for his services. In addition, he presented General Henri Gouraud with two Arabian horses and a gold-plated sword during the latter's visit to Damascus.

He gave the Al Jawf region in 1920 to Ibn Saud. Al Shalaan's alliance with the French was also short-lived, ending in July 1921 due to the emergence of a new cooperation between him and Emir Abdullah, another son of Sherif Hussein.

During this period, the adoption of modern technology such as automobiles by the Ruwallah tribe enabled the group an advantage in the desert. It changed the nature of tribal conflict and raiding. Al Shalaan himself owned multiple vehicles and in 1926 attached machine guns to these early automobiles to create a fleet of three "armoured cars", according to reports by the French military administration. These innovations drew protest from other tribal leaders.

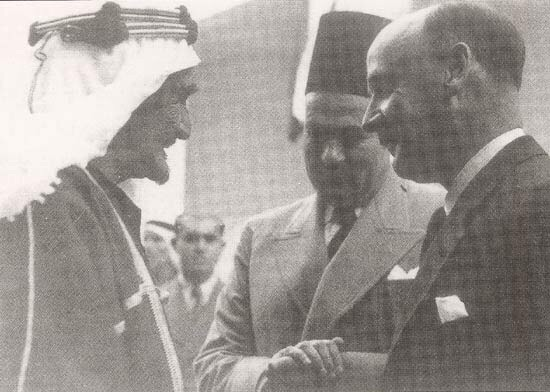
Al Shaalan (left) with Bahij al-Khatib and the French High Commissioner Gabriel Puaux in 1939

When the Hashemite forces were defeated by the Saudi forces led by Ibn Saud and lost their rule in Hejaz, he managed to develop an alliance with Ibn Saud in 1926 after his visit to him in Mecca. Al Shalaan started an anti-Hashemite propaganda among his tribesmen which led to the end of the financial aid from Emir Abdullah. State|url=https://link.gale.com/apps/doc/CS219617950/TTDA?u=wikipedia&sid=bookmark-TTDA&xid=e9edaed9 |access-date=12 August 2023|work=The Times|issue=44259|date=30 April 1926|location=Beirut}}</ref> The French financial aid to him resumed in 1927. He was also financially assisted by Ibn Saud. During the French Mandate in Syria Al Shalaan was given the title of emir. In the meantime, he allied himself with the French forces against the Druze during the Great Syrian Revolt, in exchange for getting aerial support against his tribal adversaries. He was also awarded the medal of Knight of the Legion of Honour.

Al Shalaan signed a peace treaty with the chief of the Sba'a tribe, Rakan bin Mershed, in June 1930. The Sba'a tribe was also part of the Anizah confederation. Al Shalaan was one the richest tribal chiefs in the region since his lands produced the best wheat in Syria and headed one of the most influential tribal confederation. However, he could not manage to establish his tribal alliance as an emirate.

== Personal life ==
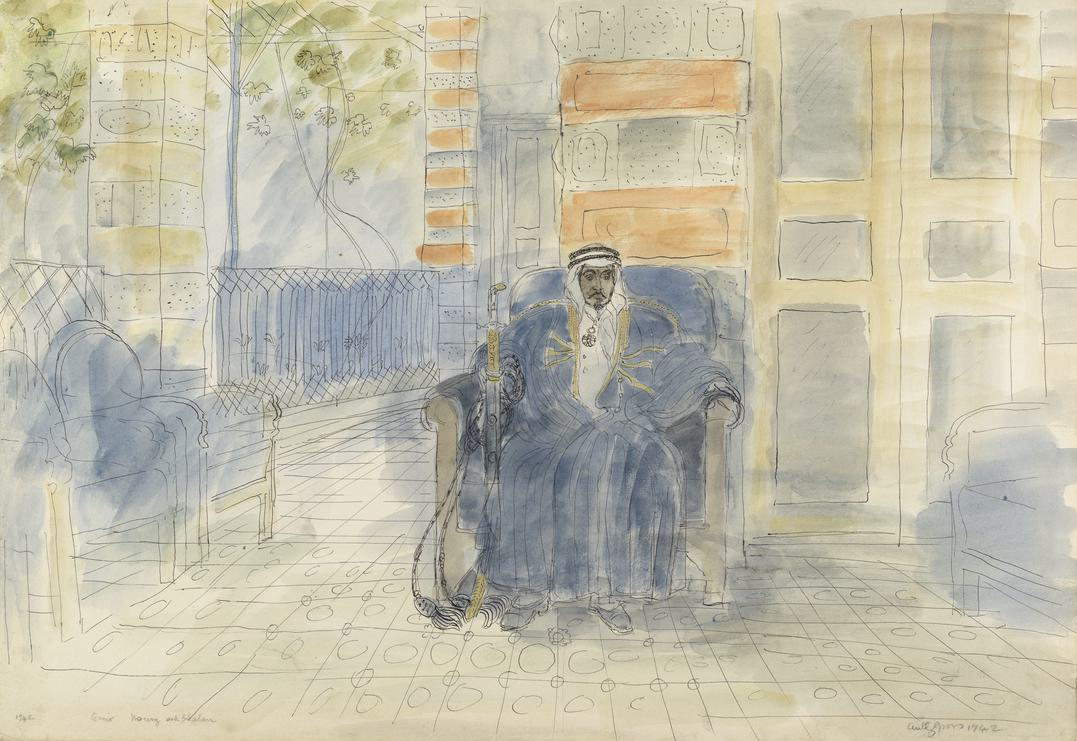
Al Shalaan in 1942

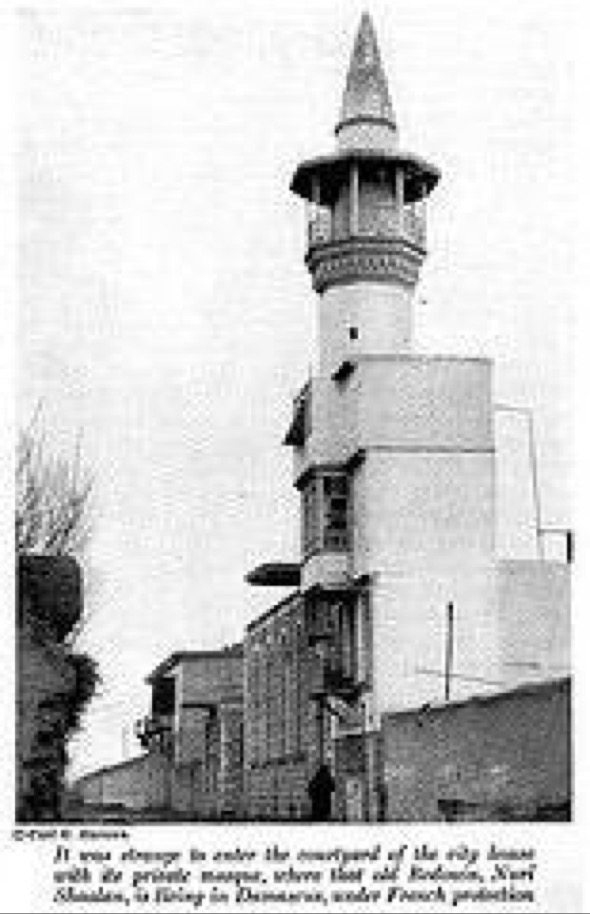
Emir Nuri Al Shaalan Mosque in Damascus

Al Shalaan bought a large residence in Damascus in 1920 which included a mosque and gardens, and his family moved there. This area became a modern and cosmopolitan district over time and is named after him.

His most notable son was Nawwaf, known as the most advanced thinker in the desert, who participated in Al Shalaan's military activities. One of his granddaughters, Nouf bint Nawwaf, married Ibn Saud. She had three sons from her marriage to Ibn Saud: Prince Thamir, Prince Mamdouh and Prince Mashour. Nuri's another granddaughter, Fawzia bint Nawwaf, married Prince Saud, heir of Ibn Saud, but they divorced. Fawzia's daughter from her later marriage wed another son of Ibn Saud, Abdullah bin Abdulaziz. Al Shalaan's other granddaughters also married to the Al Saud members, including Mishaal bin Abdulaziz and Nasser bin Abdulaziz. These marriages improved the relations between Al Shalaan and Ibn Saud.

Al Shalaan was a warrior poet and produced many short poems and sayings. He died in Damascus on 1 July 1942 and was succeeded by his grandson Fawwaz as Emir of the Ruwallah. He was buried in Adra, near Damascus, on land he owned.

== Sources ==
- Bidwell, Robin (2012). Dictionary of Modern Arab History – An A to Z of over 2,000 entries from 1798 to the present day. Routledge: Taylor & Francis Group. ISBN 9781136162916.
