= Auda Abu Tayi =

Bedouin Arab leader (1874–1924)

Auda Abu-Tayeh عودة أبو تايه
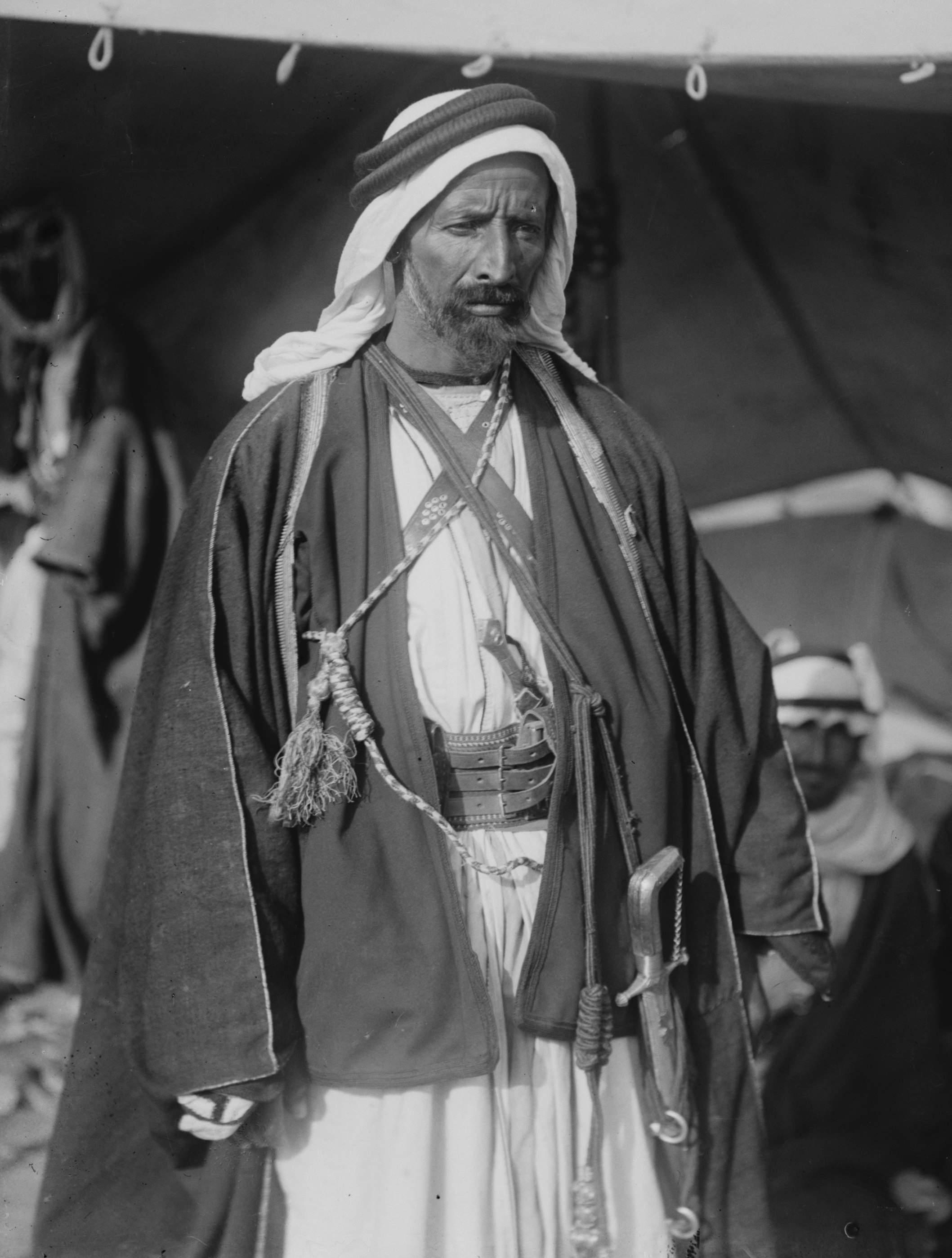
- Photograph of Auda abu Tayi, probably taken by G. Eric Matson (1888–1977).Tabuk, Hejaz 1921
- Born: 11 January 1874; Hejaz Vilayet, Ottoman Empire
- Died: 27 December 1924 (aged 50); Amman, Emirate of Transjordan
- Relatives: Mohammed al-Dheilan (cousin); Ibn Zaal (nephew)
- Military career
- Allegiance: (Arab Revolt) Bedouin Arabs
- Branch: Huwaytat
- Conflicts: Arab Revolt: Siege of Medina; Battle of Fwelia; Battle of Aba el Lissan; Battle of Aqaba; Battle of Talifeh; Battle of Daraa; Capture of Damascus

Auda Abu Tayeh or Awda Abu Tayih (Arabic: عودة أبو تايه 11 January 1874 – 27 December 1924), nicknamed the Commander of the People or the Desert Falcon, was the Sheikh of a section of the Howeitat or Huwaytat tribe of Bedouin Arabs at the time of the Great Arab Revolt during the First World War. The Howeitat lived in what is now Saudi Arabia/Jordan.

Auda led the Arab forces in several battles, the most significant ones being the battle of Aqaba, where he managed to capture the city, seizing the entire Ottoman garrison, and the siege of Damascus, when he took the city alongside Faisal. He died in 1924 and was buried in Amman. He is considered a national hero in Jordan.

In the Arab world, he is seen as a generous and honorable man. However, outside of the Arab world, he is mainly known through his portrayal in T. E. Lawrence's 1926 autobiographical work Seven Pillars of Wisdom and from the fictionalised depiction of him in David Lean's 1962 film Lawrence of Arabia. Those accounts, which presented him as a greedy and slick man, have been criticized by historians.

== Biography ==
=== Early life ===
Auda was the son of Harb Abu Tayi (? – 1904). He was the fourth among five brothers and one sister and had a rough youth.

When he was young, he learned the Bedouin way of life, grazing herds along the farms first, and later elsewhere as he grew. His mother was particularly tough; during a confrontation with another tribe, Auda, still a child, pursued attackers and killed several. Upon returning to the camp, he found his mother, holding a knife, telling him that if he hadn't been brave, she would have cut off the breast that nursed him. As a result of this upbringing, he remained illiterate throughout his life, not knowing how to read or write. However, he had a perfect understanding of Bedouin customary traditions and became a competent Bedouin judge in cases requiring tribal judgments.

He married relatively late, around the age of twenty, which was uncommon in Bedouin society at that time. This is likely due to the fact that he was in love with another woman in his youth, and Harb Abu Tayi, his father, refused to let him marry her because her father was reputed to be a coward. Later, she married another man. Auda married another woman but throughout his life, he sent gifts to this woman. However, he refused to accept her offer of divorcing her husband to marry him when she proposed it later on.

Lawrence recorded that the Jazi Howeitat had formerly been under the leadership of the House of Rashid, the amirs of Ha'il, but had since fragmented and that Auda had come to control the Eastern Howeitat, known as the abu Tayi. Auda had taken up the claims of his father, Harb abu Tayi (? – 1904), who had contested the tribe's chieftainship with Arar ibn Jazi.

Auda and his ibn Jazi rival, Arar's half-brother Abtan, diverted the energies of the Howeitat—previously settled farmers and camel herders—into raiding, greatly increasing the tribe's wealth but introducing a mainly nomadic lifestyle. Tensions between them and the Ottoman administration had increased after an incident in 1908, when two soldiers were killed who had been sent to demand payment of a tax that Auda claimed to have already paid.

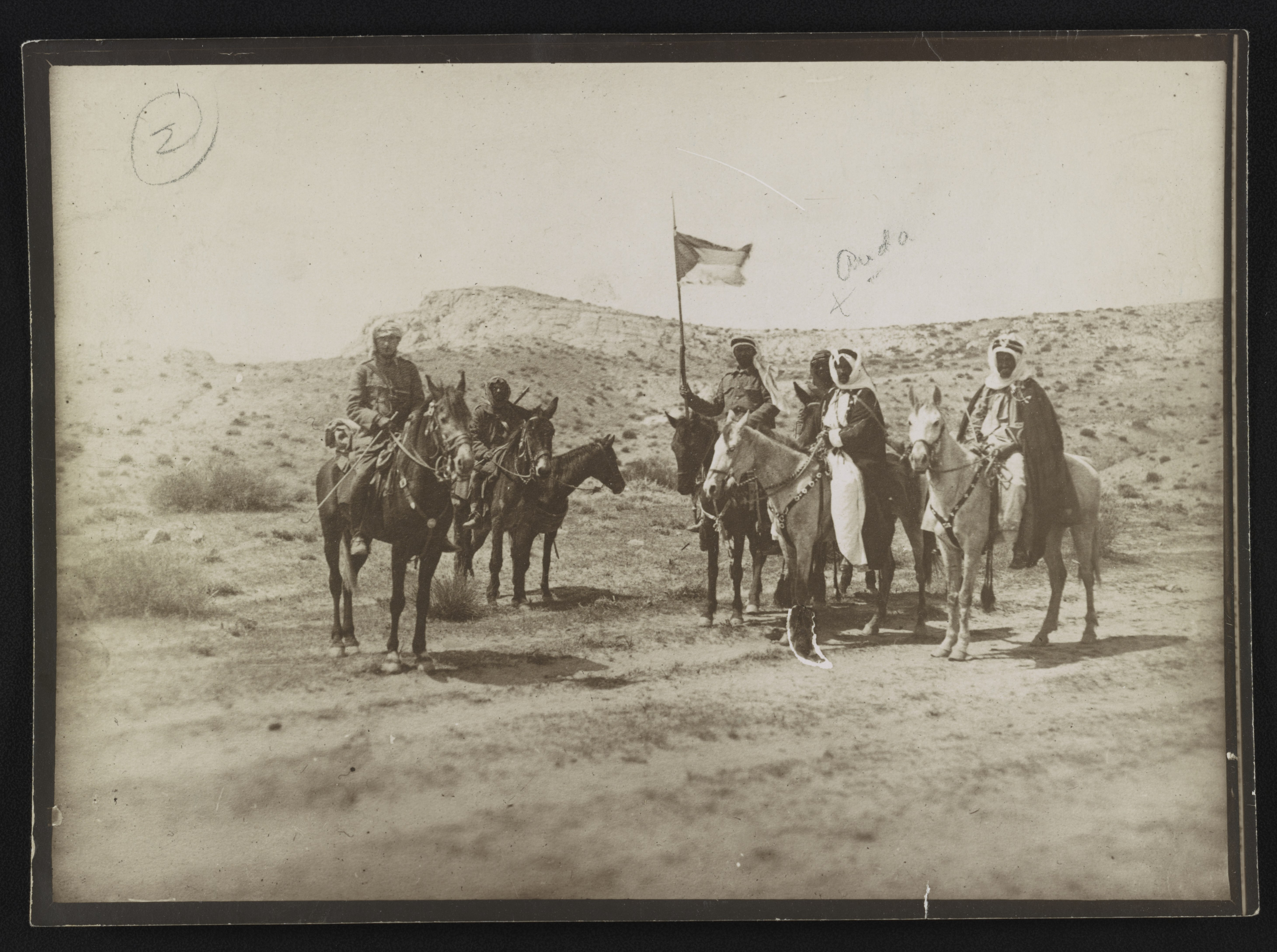
Auda Abu Tayi (marked with an X) of the Howeitat offers allegiance to the King; a soldier next to him bears the Arab flag. (1917)

According to historian Mahmoud Obeidat, Auda was the "only person among the tribal leaders whom the Turkish authorities were pursuing, the only person who rejected the decisions of the Turkish administration, and the only person who saw himself as far superior to the Ottoman governor".

According to Suleiman al-Mousa and Mahmoud Krishan, after killing these two Turkish soldiers, Auda was sought by the police. While secretly heading to Ma'an to visit a friend, the police received information about his presence and surrounded the house where he was hiding. Unconcerned, he got up, had his breakfast—despite the owner's invitations to leave through a back door quickly—and decided to exit through the main door, greeting the Ottoman troops who had come to arrest him. In this way, he managed to evade the Turkish police, who let him pass.

He had three sons, the only surviving one, Muhammad, died in 1987, and it is said that he provided him with a good education in the tribal lifestyle. He had thirteen grandchildren, all of whom live in Jordan.

=== Great Arab revolt ===
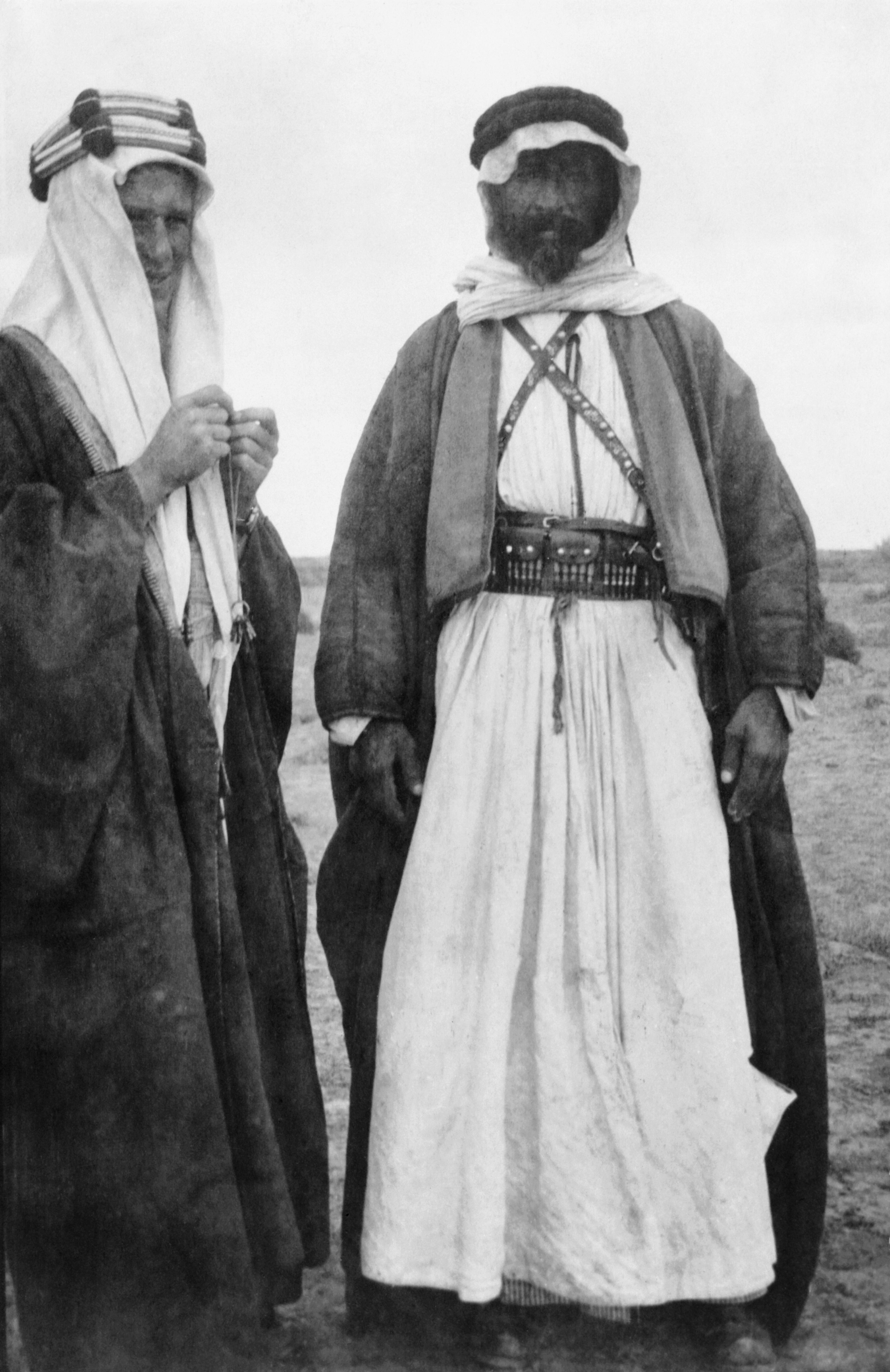
Auda abu Tayi with T. E. Lawrence, 1917

At the beginning of the Great Arab Revolt, he joined the Sharif of Mecca, Hussein bin Ali alongside the Howeitat tribe.

According to several researchers, his and his tribe's mobility and knowledge of the desert were significant factors contributing to the success of the Arab Revolt and stood out as one of their assets. He and his tribesmen were lead forces in the fall of Aqaba (July 1917) and Damascus (October 1918).

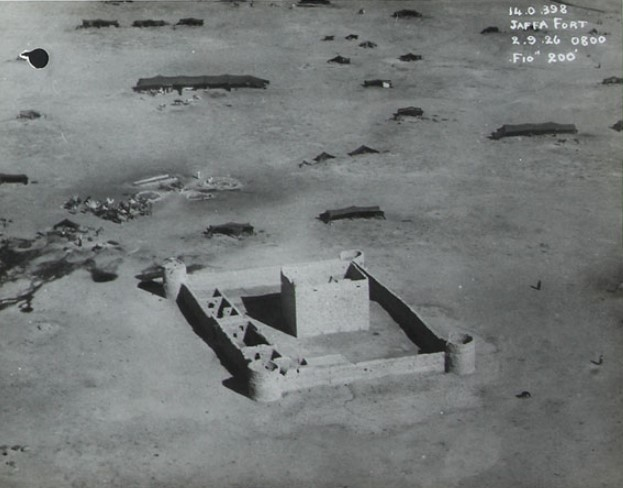
Al-Jafr castle in Jordan, 1927, this building was started by Auda Abu Tayi after WWI. However, he died before the completion of the building.

Auda abu Tayi is considered a hero of the Arab revolt. In reward for his services rendered, he received a sword from the hands of Hussein as a token of friendship.

About his role in the Great Arab Revolt, he declared:

In my body, there are twenty-two wounds, the most cherished of which are the last wounds, which were for the glory of the Arabs. I will not hesitate to offer what remains of my intact body to my nation and people, and I swear to Allah, what I say is a sacrifice.

He managed to take Aleppo, in the last days of World War I.

=== Post-war years ===
He continued raiding, for example, in 1921, he tried to do a raid in Iraq, engaging in a march of more than 600 km in the desert. However, the expedition resulted in a disaster after their enemies spotted them near their arrival point and started depleting all water supplies, destroying the whole expedition except a small dozen of tribesmen, including Auda and his son Muhammad.

Auda subsequently helped the ephemeral army of Hashemite Syria, led by Faisal. After the collapse of the Arab government in Damascus, which was invaded by France, Auda retired to the desert, building a modern fort at Al-Jafr east of Ma'an with Turkish prisoners of war. Before it was completed, however, he died in 1924 of natural causes. He was buried in Ras al-Ain, Amman, Jordan.

Nowadays, only ruins remain of his building due to it being in the desert and not receiving heritage care and restoration.

=== Name ===
His full genealogy was, in Arabic: عودة بن الحرب بن صباح بن فرج بن محمد بن فرج بن فرج بن سلامة بن علوان بن قبال بن حويط بن غازي، المعروف باسم أبو تايه الحويطي (أبو عناد)., romanized: ʿUdah ibn al-Harb ibn Ṣabāḥ ibn Faraj ibn Muḥammad ibn Faraj ibn Faraj ibn Salāmah ibn ʿAlwan ibn Qābal ibn Huwaiṭ ibn Ghāzī, al-maʿrūf bismi Abu Tayeh al-Huwaītī (Abu Anād).

He received the nicknames of "Commander of the People" and of "Desert Falcon".

== Legacy ==
=== Historical legacy ===
He was presented by some people, on the account of the movie, and to a lesser extent on Seven Pillars of Wisdom as being a sly and greedy individual. Much of this modern-day presentation has been described by the historian Graham Dawson as being rooted in his sensationalised depiction by the American writer, broadcaster, and documentary filmmaker Lowell Thomas as a figure of anarchic, primitive masculine energy deliberately contrasted against the British imperial masculinity Thomas viewed Lawrence as embodying. However, historians have criticized these accounts of Auda, viewing them as misrepresenting him and wider Bedouin society in general.

=== Political legacy ===
He is considered a national figure by the Jordanian people.

=== Artistical legacy ===
==== Literature ====
He is an important figure in Lawrence's semi-fictionalized account of the Arab Revolt, "Seven Pillars of Wisdom", which represents him and the Arab people in a romanticized way. Lawrence portrayed him as someone who epitomized everything noble, powerful, and proud about the Bedouin, "the greatest fighting man in northern Arabia," with an impressive lineage spanning many generations of great desert Howeitat warriors of the Arabian Peninsula.

He was described as a generous man by Khayr al-Din al-Zirikli in one of his books and by Abdal Fattah al-Yaffi.in his Memories.

==== Cinema ====
He was portrayed in the David Lean film Lawrence of Arabia by Anthony Quinn, which included various stereotypes against Arabs and his figure. Auda's descendants were so incensed by the portrayal of their ancestor that they sued Columbia Studios, the film's producers; the case was eventually dropped.

Auda was also featured as a supporting character in Terence Rattigan's Lawrence-themed play Ross.

He is also portrayed in 2009 Qatari film Auda abu Tayeh, which talks about his life in Arabia to Arab Revolt, and his death. In 2008, there was also a series about him produced and filmed in Jordan.

=== Family ===
His granddaughter, Evon Abu-Taieh, served as the head of the Computer Information Systems and Business Technology faculties at the Aqaba branch of the University of Jordan. In 2005, she earned her PhD in Computer Information Systems from the Arab Academy for Banking and Financial Sciences in Amman, Jordan. She was present in a 2016 documentary, The Great Arab Revolt.
