= Robin Leonard Bidwell =

English orientalist & author (1927–1994)

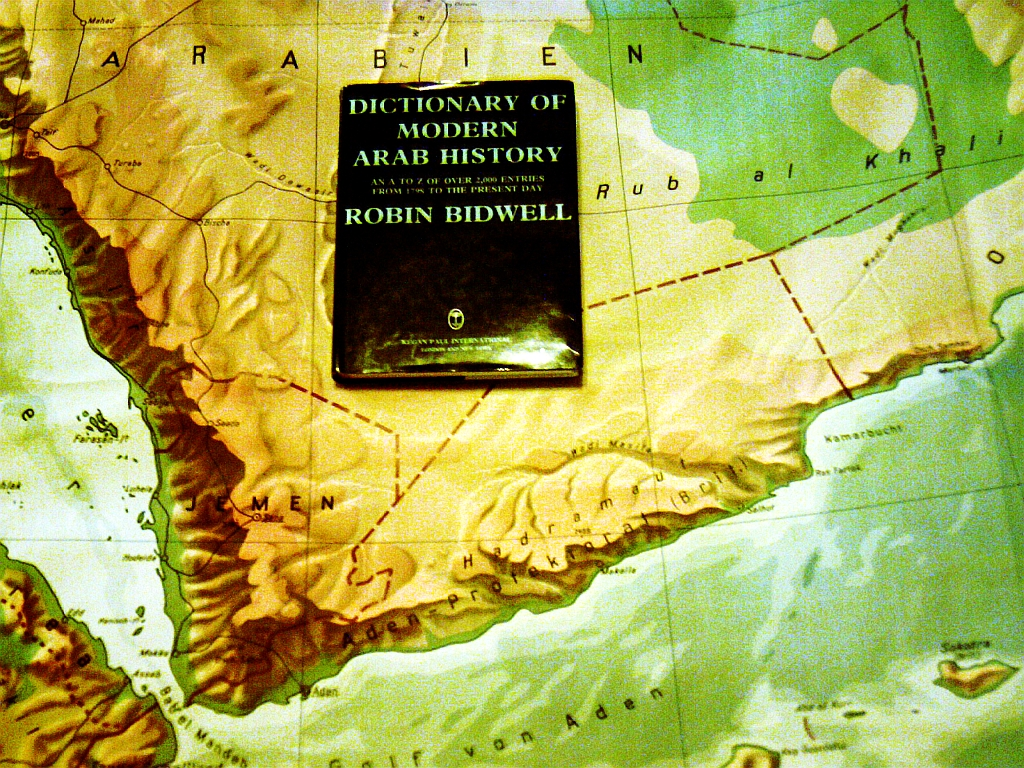
In the Western Aden Protectorate Bidwell served as Political Officer and started to become an expert for Yemen and the Arab World. His Dictionary of Modern Arab History became his life-time-work.

Robin ("Rob") Leonard Bidwell (25 August 1927 in St Giles, London – 1994 in Coney Weston or Bury St Edmunds) was an English orientalist and author. He published many books about Yemen and Arabia as well as about French and British colonial history.

After education at Stonyhurst College, Downside School and Pembroke College, Cambridge, he was sent as Intelligence Corps sergeant to the Suez Canal Zone. From 1955 to 1959 he served as Political officer in Western Aden Protectorate in the hinterland of present-day Yemen. Thereafter as Oxford University Press travelling editor for the Middle East he visited all Middle East and North African countries. In 1965 he returned to Cambridge University where he earned his PhD in 1968 about the French administration in Morocco. Between 1968 and 1990 he had been Secretary and Librarian of the Middle East Centre in the Faculty of Oriental Studies in the University of Cambridge. From 1980 on he dedicated the rest of his life to his masterpiece Dictionary of Modern Arab History – An A to Z of over 2,000 entries from 1798 to the present day.

== Bibliography (selection) ==
- Guide to Government Ministers (1971/73)
- Affairs of Kuwait (1971/73)
- Affairs of Arabia (1971/73)
- Morocco Under Colonial Rule – French Administration of Tribal Areas 1912–1956 (1973)
- Arabian Studies (1974)
- Travellers in Arabia (1976)
- Guide to African Ministers (1978)
- The Two Yemens (1983)
- Arabian Gulf Intelligence (1985)
- Arabian Personalities of the Early Twentieth Century (1986)
- The Bulletin of the Arab Bureau in Cairo 1916–19 (1986)
- New Arabian Studies (1993)
- Dictionary of Modern Arab History (1998)
