= Khirbet es-Samra =

Archaeological site in Mafraq, Jordan

- خربة السمراء (Arabic)
- Hatita
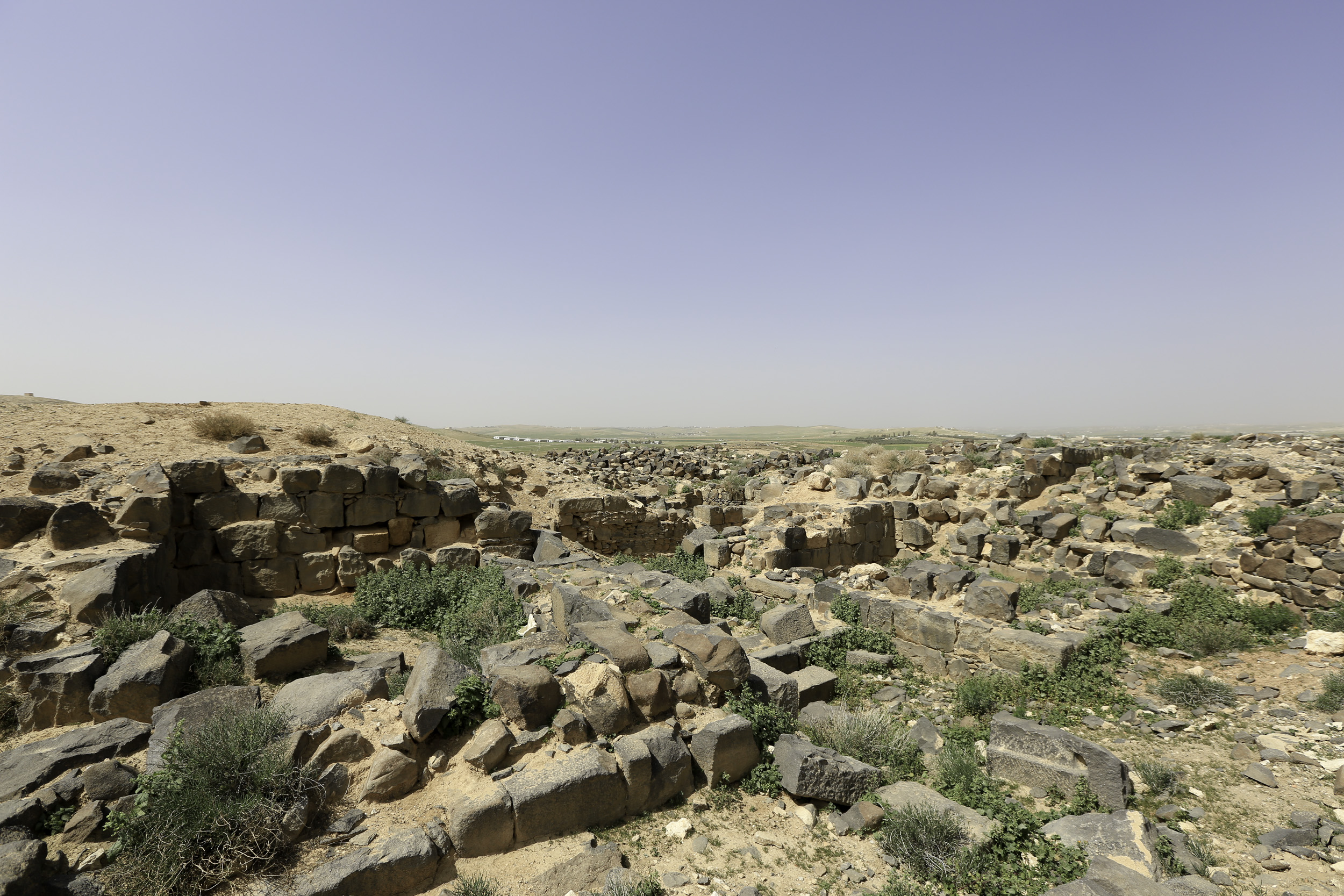
- Ruins at Khirbet es-Samra

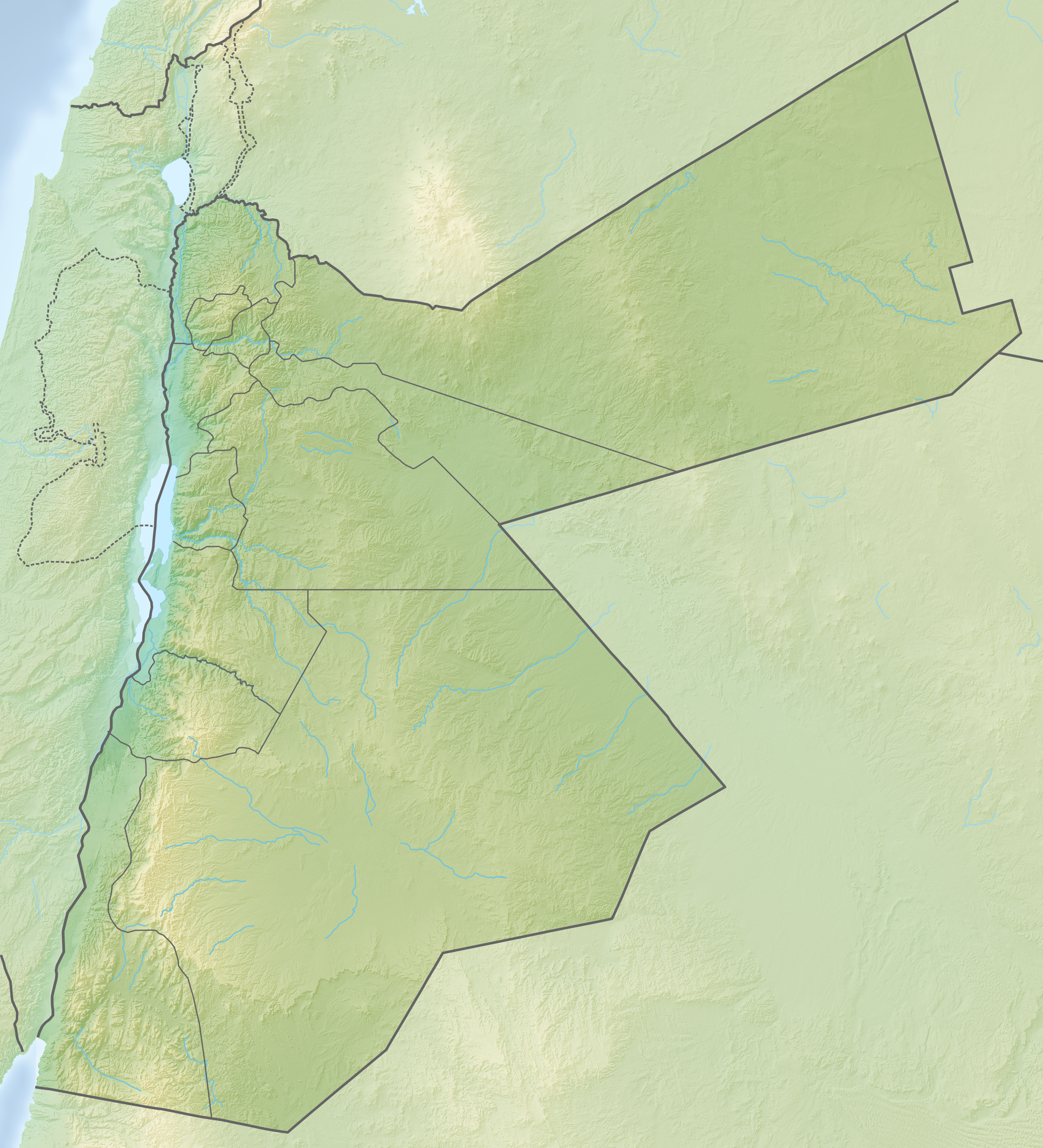
- Location within Jordan
- 32°10′49.2″N 36°09′45″E
- Type: settlement, mansio (road station)
- Location: Mafraq Governorate, Jordan
- PAL: 260/177

History
- Abandoned: 15th century

Site notes
- Material: Basalt, limestone
- Condition: In ruins
- Public access: Yes

Khirbet es-Samra (Arabic: خربة السمراء, lit. 'the dark ruin'; ancient Hatita on the Tabula Peutingeriana) is an archaeological site comprising a Roman and Byzantine era village and an adjacent roadside station (mansio) located along the Via Traiana Nova in northern Jordan.

The inscriptions from the ancient cemetery at Khirbet es-Samra reflect a multilingual environment, including texts in Greek, Melkite Aramaic, Nabataean, and Hismaic. The faunal remains from the roadside station indicate a diet based primarily on sheep and goat meat, supplemented by poultry, beef, and pork, with occasional consumption of game, fish, and possibly imported marine products.

== Location and name ==
Khirbet es-Samra is located approximately 40 km (25 mi) northeast of Amman, in a region that was once part of the rural hinterland of Bosra, the capital of the Roman province of Arabia. The site stands on a hill, situated on the basaltic plateau east of Via Traiana Nova, a Roman road that linked Bosra to Ayla, constructed between 107 and 114 CE under governor Gaius Claudius Severus and the Emperors Trajan and Hadrian.

Referred to in antiquity as Hatita on the Peutinger Table, a medieval copy of an ancient Roman map, the site is known today as Khirbet es-Samra, meaning "dark ruins" in Arabic.

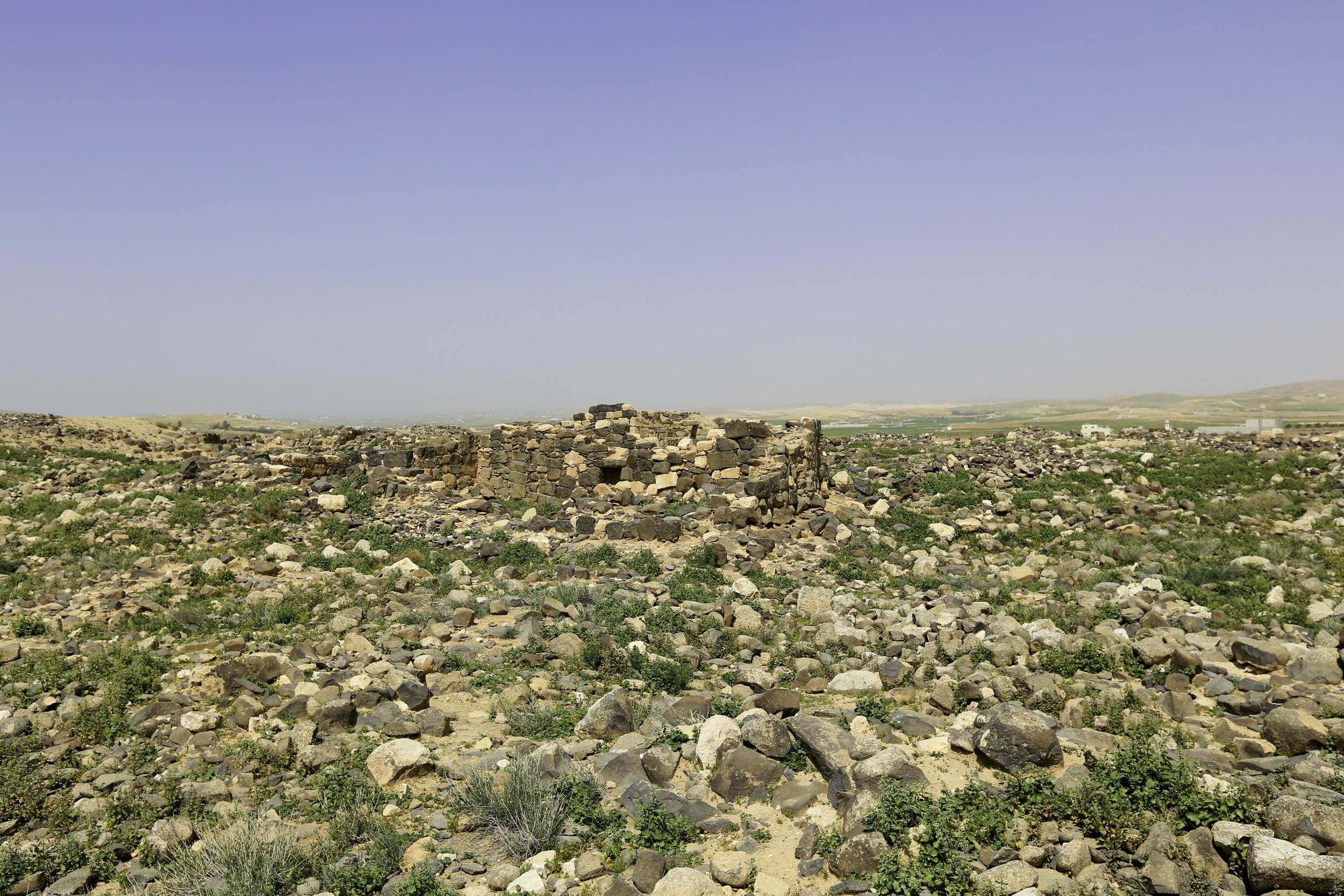
Khirbet es-Samra

== History ==
=== Roman mansio ===
The earliest significant occupation at the site is dated to the 2nd and 3rd centuries CE. A mansio (a Roman road station) active between 150 and 250 CE was discovered approximately 600 meters from the ruins of the ancient village, which in the Roman period served as the location of a fortress. The mansio likely served travelers on the imperial road system (cursus publicus), although its exact function is unclear; it may also have operated as a statio, taberna, or mutatio. Following the abandonment of the station (likely due to the disuse of the adjacent road), its stone walls were dismantled and reused in the construction of the village.

=== Byzantine village ===
In the late 4th century CE, Khirbet es-Samra underwent a phase of reorganization during the reigns of Valentinian I, Valens, and Gratian. In the Byzantine period, a village developed around the fortress, and by the 6th century, the site had ceased to serve a military role, though it remained inhabited as an active Christian community; it probably reached its peak prosperity in the following century. Archaeological excavations have revealed eleven churches, some adorned with mosaics featuring geometric motifs, animals, depictions of walled towns, and Greek inscriptions.

=== Middle Ages ===
The village continued to exist during the Umayyad period (7th–8th centuries), remaining Christian even after the Muslim conquest. However, like many rural settlements in the region, Khirbet es-Samra declined in the following centuries. During the Ayyubid or Mamluk period (13th–15th centuries), a small mosque was constructed within the ruins of a former Byzantine church. The site appears to have been abandoned by the 15th century CE and remained uninhabited until the 20th century.

=== Hejaz railway ===
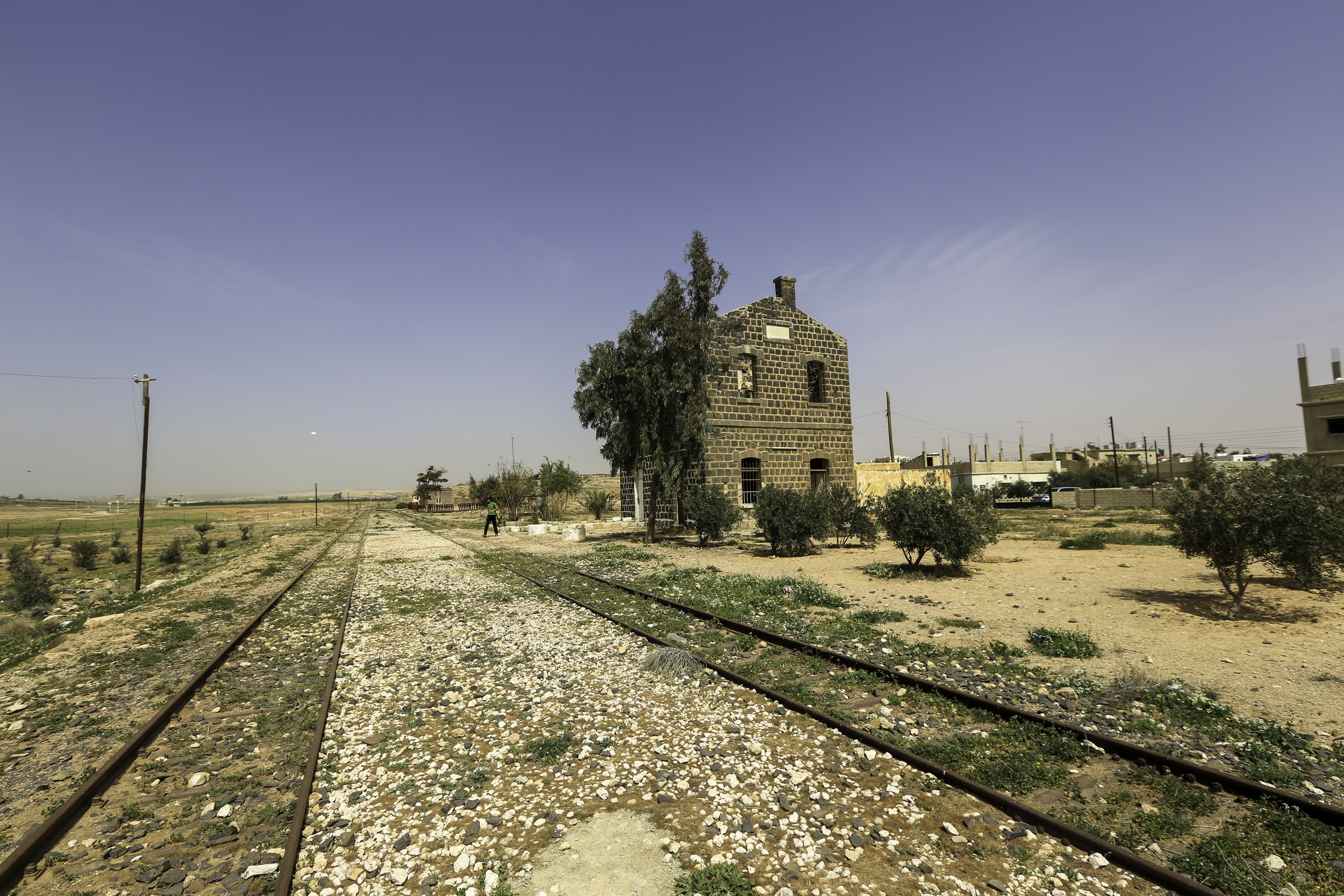
A railway station in Khirbet es-Samra

The Ottomans built the Hejaz railway by the site. In the 1960s, Beni Hassan Bedouin tribe settled next to the ruins, on the site of the old cemetery. In 1981, the ancient remains were studied by a French archaeological mission from the CNRS and the École Biblique, under the direction of Jean-Baptiste Humbert, Alain Desreumaux and Gérard Thébault. A major sewage treatment plant, reprocessing Amman's sewage, was built south of the village in 2002.

== Research history ==
The site was visited by John Edward Gray Hill in 1897. In the same year, Alfred von Domaszewski and Rudolf Ernst Brünnow excavated the site, as part of the Limes Arabicus in the province of Arabia Petraea. British archaeologist George Macrae Findlater reported that the site could not be regarded as a military building, but it might have belonged to a huge agricultural enterprise with its aqueducts and complex irrigation system. Meanwhile, American archaeologist Samuel Thomas Parker discovered rectangular fortifications at the nearby similar sites, and concluded military use by late antique border guards. However, David L. Kennedy reported in 2004 that the site contained either caravanserai or early Islamic residences.

== Archaeology ==
=== Faunal remains ===
Excavations at the mansio yielded an assemblage of 5,180 faunal remains. The assemblage included mammals, birds, fish, seashells, and unidentifiable bone fragments. The most frequent species were sheep/goat (747 remains; MNI: 12), followed by chicken (145 remains; MNI: 12), pig (86 remains; MNI: 5), and cattle (69 remains; MNI: 3). Caprine skeletal profiles indicate that all anatomical parts were present, and overrepresentation of the fore- and hindlimbs was noted. Butchery marks were found on five bones, and 73 caprine bones showed traces of calcination. Age data indicate most caprines were slaughtered between two and three years old.

Other species identified include camel (26 remains), equids (16 remains), dog (8 remains), gazelle (7 remains), and Cape hare (15 remains). Three ostrich eggshell fragments were also recovered. Fish remains included tuna (likely preserved through drying or salting), tilapia, and carp, while 12 seashells from five families were found. Both the tuna and the seashells indicate trade activity along the Via Nova Traiana, having been carried as imports from the Red Sea.

A total of 376 burned bones (7.3% of the assemblage) were documented, mostly recovered from the central courtyard, and involved only species known to have been consumed. The faunal remains were found across all parts of the building, with the highest concentration in the courtyard, and are interpreted as food waste linked to human activity.

=== Funerary inscriptions ===
Excavations at the cemetery of Khirbet es-Samra, carried out since 1995 by the University of Hamburg, have uncovered a number of inscribed funerary stones. These include Greek, Melkite Aramaic, Nabataean, and Hismaic (North Arabian) texts. Earlier work by French archaeologists led to the publication of a large volume on the site's epigraphy in 1998, which documented inscriptions not only from Khirbet es-Samra, but also from Rihab and other nearby sites. The majority of inscriptions are engraved on tombstones, often found reused in later graves or structures.

The Greek inscriptions fall into two types. Type 1 consists of semi-rectangular stelae without Christian symbols. These usually record the name of the deceased in the nominative, sometimes with a patronym and age, and occasionally include an exclamation such as Θάρσι ("Courage!"). This type is dated to the 3rd–4th centuries CE. Type 2 includes larger, irregular stones bearing crosses, with short inscriptions in Greek or Melkite Aramaic, usually consisting only of the deceased's name. This type is restricted to Khirbet es-Samra and is assigned to the Byzantine period.

One stone (KS-1261), bearing a Greek inscription and a cross, is dated to 457 of the era of Provincia Arabia, or 562/3 CE, making it the only dated Type 2 inscription found so far. Another stone (KS-1326), written in Melkite Aramaic, was found among rubble in Site C and includes a cross and a short personal name. A gravestone in Nabataean script (KS-1685) was recovered from a reused context in Tomb 517. It is the only Nabataean tombstone discovered so far at the site and names Ma'nu son of Taym-'Obodat. A Hismaic inscription was recorded on fragments of a reused basalt block (KS-1331 + KS-1332 + KS-1382), discovered in Tomb 357. The script is identified as Hismaic, with some letters damaged or unclear, and the reading remains tentative.

== See also ==
- Hejaz railway
- Umm el-Jimal

== Bibliography ==
- Findlater, George MacRae (2003). Imperial Control in Roman and Byzantine Arabia: A Landscape Interpretation of Archaeological Evidence in Southern Jordan. The University of Edinburgh.
- Hill, John Edward (1897). "A Journey to Petra". Palestine Exploration Quarterly. 29.
- Kennedy, David L. (2004). The Roman Army in Jordan. London: Council for British Research in the Levant. ISBN 0-9539102-1-0.
- Monchot, Hervé (2022). "Quid novum ad mensam hodie? The faunal remains from a Roman road station at Khirbet es-Samra, Jordan". Journal of Roman Archaeology. 35 (1): 86–106. doi:10.1017/S1047759422000034. ISSN 1047-7594.
- Nabulsi, Abdalla J.; Macdonald, Michael C. A. (2014-06-01). "Epigraphic Diversity in the Cemetery at Khirbet Es-Samrāʾ, Jordan". Palestine Exploration Quarterly. 146 (2): 149–161. doi:10.1179/0031032814Z.00000000082. ISSN 0031-0328.
- Nriagu, Jerome O. (2008). Encyclopedia of Environmental Health. Elsevier Science. ISBN 9780444522726.
- Parker, Samuel Thomas (1976). Archaeological Survey of the "Limes Arabicus": A Preliminary Report. Annual of the Department of Antiquities of Jordan.
