= Ruwallah =

Arabian tribe

The Ruwallah (Arabic: الرولة, Rwala Arabic ir-Rwāle, singular Ruweili/Ruwaili) are a large Arab tribe of the northern Arabian Peninsula and Syrian Desert, including Jordan.

== History ==
Until the demarcation of borders in the Middle East in the early 20th century, the Ruwallah were an almost entirely warrior tribe centered in the region of al-Jawf and Sirhan Valley in northern Arabia, though their tribal territories extended as far southwards as al-Qasim and as far northwards as Damascus. The tribe came to being sometime in the 16th century, or shortly thereafter, and belongs to the Dhana Maslam branch of the large Anizah tribal confederation. They were active in the Arab Revolt during the reign of Nuri bin Hazaa Al Shalaan against the Ottoman Empire during World War I. The leadership of the tribe is with the House of Sha'lan or Al Sha'lan, who in recent decades have had close ties with the Lebanese Government and Saudi royal family. Most of the tribe's members have settled into sedentary or urban life in Saudi Arabia, Jordan, and Syria.

== Branches ==
The Ruwallah tribe mostly consists of five major branches:

- Al-Kwakbah – singular (Kwikbi)
- Al-Doughman – singular (Doughmani)
- Al-Murre 'eth – singular (Murr 'ethee)
- Al-Frrejah – singular (Frreeji)
- Al-Ga' 'a' 'gaah – singular (Ga 'ee'ga'ae)
- Al-Alrahmoun

== Sources ==
- Bidwell, Robin (2012). Dictionary of Modern Arab History – An A to Z of over 2,000 entries from 1798 to the present day. Routledge: Taylor & Francis Group. ISBN 9781136162916.
- Tauber, Eliezer (2014). The Arab Movements in World War I. Taylor & Francis. ISBN 9781135199852.

== See also ==
- 'Anizzah
- Bani Sakhr
- Majali
