= Rosario Pisani =

French officer of North African descent

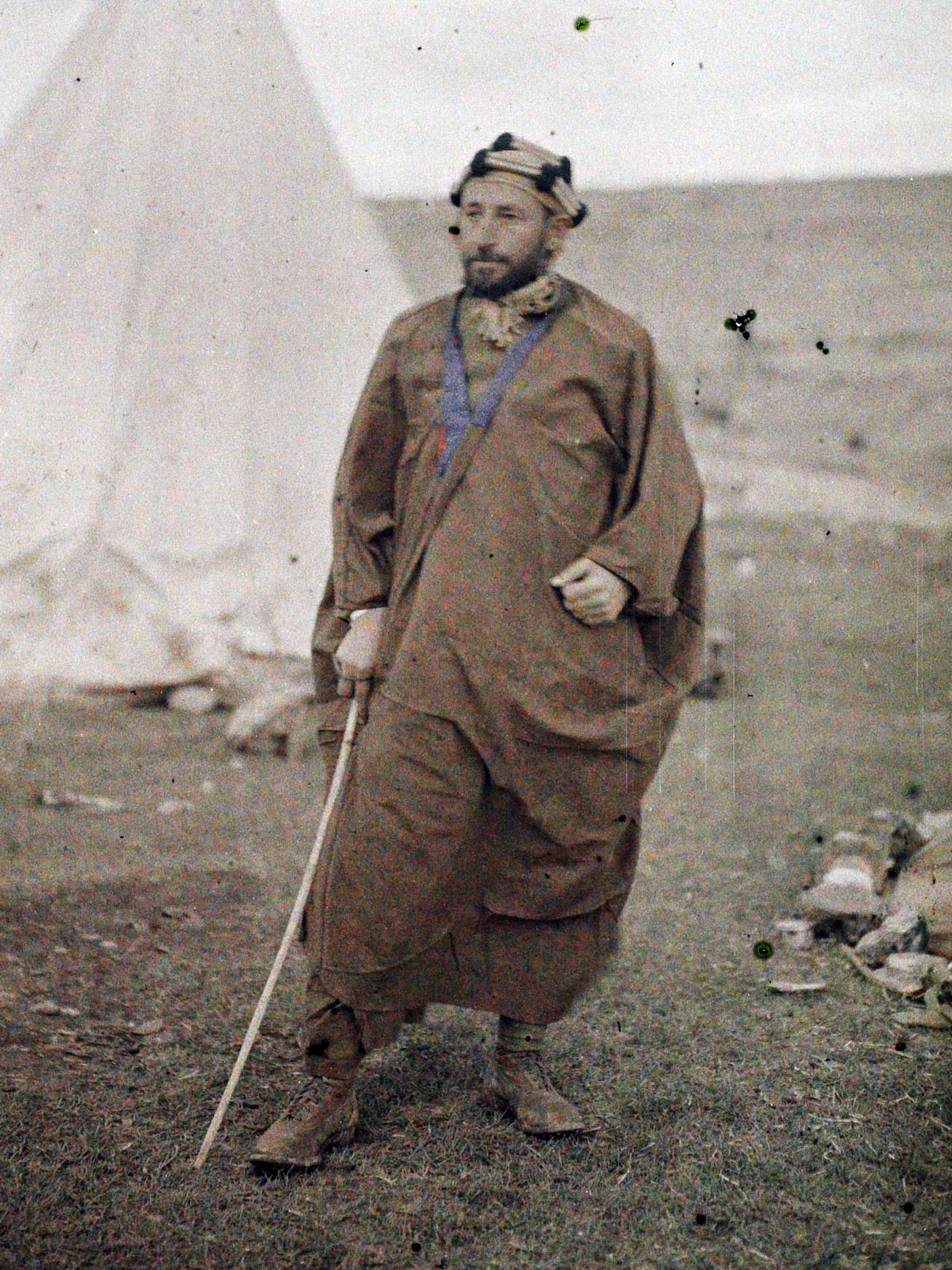
- Rosario Pisani in Quweira, Arabia, during the Arab Revolt, 1918. Autochrome by Paul Castelnau
- Born: 1880; La Calle
- Died: 1952 (aged 71–72); Fez
- Military career
- Allegiance: France
- Rank: Captain
- Unit: Leader of the French contingent in the Arab Revolt

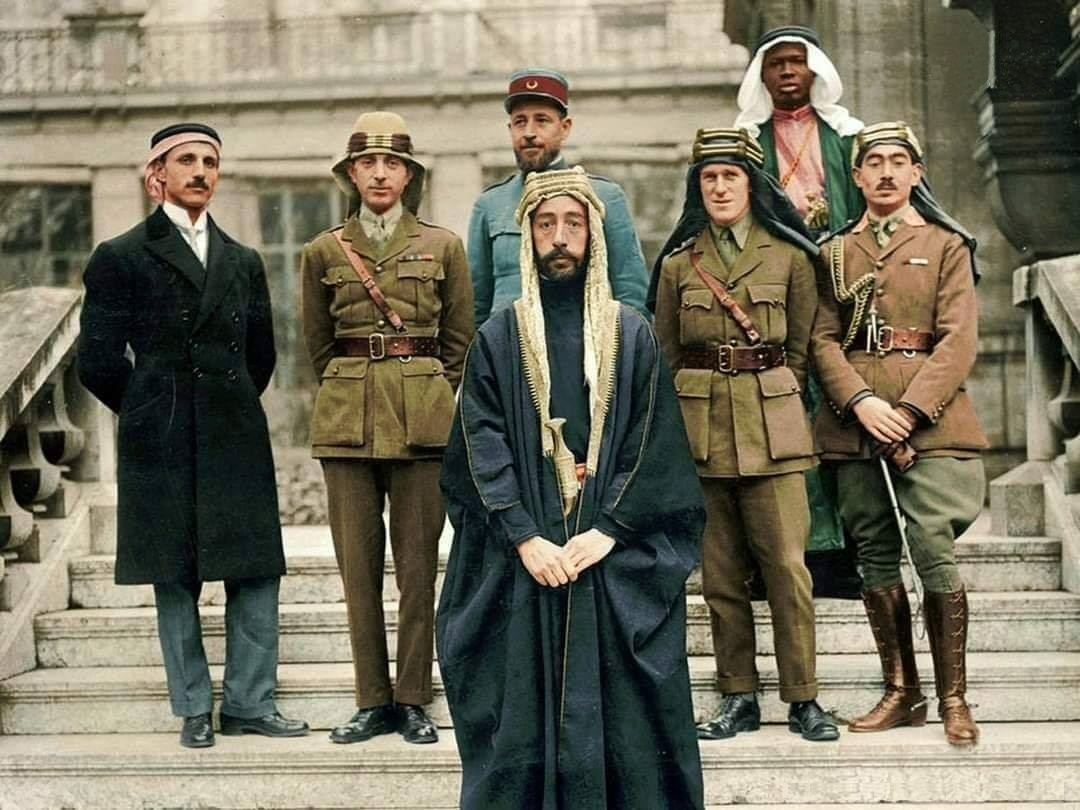
Emir Faisal's delegation at Versailles, during the Paris Peace Conference of 1919. Left to right: Rustam Haidar, Nuri as-Said, Prince Faisal, Captain Rosario Pisani(behind Faisal), T. E. Lawrence, Feisal's personal slave (name unknown), Captain Tahsin Kadry.

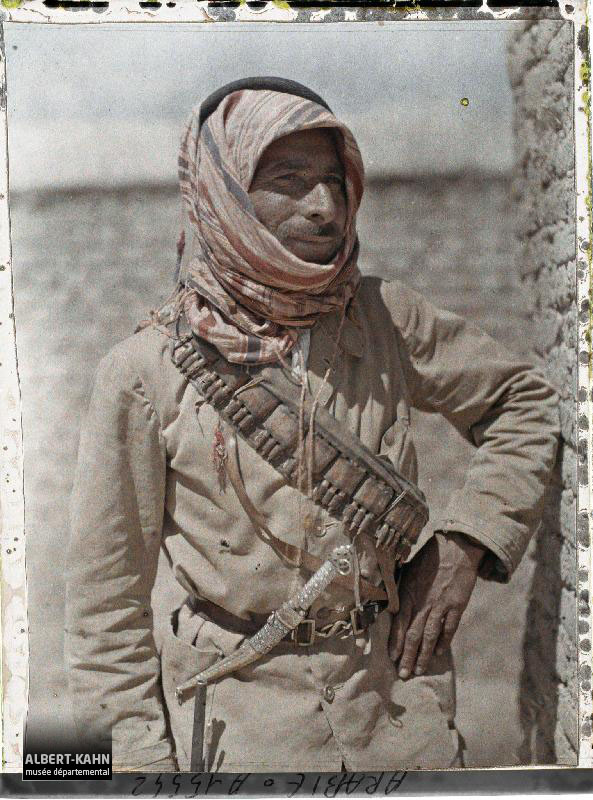
French Captain Rosario Pisani while helping with the Arab Revolt, Albert-Kahn collection, The Archives of the Planet

Rosario Pisani (La Calle, 1880 – Fez, 1952), was a French Captain of Northern African descent who fought against the Ottoman Empire in World War I. Pisani's force would grow into what would become the Arab Northern Army and he was one of the most successful raiders during the Arab Revolt.

== French forces in the Arab Revolt ==
The French military mission in charge of fighting the Ottoman Empire was commanded by Colonel Édouard Brémond. A French officer, Pisani, had arrived from Morocco to command 200 North African soldiers in the Arab Uprising. This force had Arabic-speaking junior officers volunteers who were mostly born in North Africa as well as another 12 officers that were French specialists. In the book Setting the Desert on Fire the author quoted a British officer as saying Pisani was a "brigand disguised unconvincingly as a French officer."

On 27 September 1917, Lawrence set off for another raid on the Hejaz railway. He took Captain Pisani hoping to train him and some Syrians to take over these raids as they took up a lot of time. Lawrence found it exhausting playing tribal mediator. During this raid, he settled "twelve cases of assault, four camel-thefts, one marriage settlement, fourteen feuds, two evil eyes, and a bewitchment."

== After the First World War ==
During the fighting against the Ottomans, Feisal took a liking to Pisani and asked him to come to the Paris Peace Conference to advise him alongside T. E. Lawrence aka Lawrence of Arabia.

== See also ==
- Arab Revolt

== Bibliography ==
Notes

References

- Barr, James (2011). Setting the Desert on Fire: T.E. Lawrence and Britain's Secret War in Arabia, 1916-18. Bloomsbury Publishing. ISBN 9781408827895. - Total pages: 384
- Didier, Philippi (Aug 29, 2020). "Rosario Pisani, l'artilleur de Lawrence d'Arabie" [Rosario Pisani, Lawrence of Arabia's gunner] (in French). militaria-mag.com.
- Greenhalgh, Elizabeth (2014). The French Army and the First World War. Cambridge University Press. ISBN 9781107012356. - Total pages: 469
- Johnson, Robert (2020). Lawrence of Arabia on War: The Campaign in the Desert 1916–18. Bloomsbury Publishing. ISBN 9781472834881. - Total pages: 256
- Murphy, David (2008). The Arab Revolt 1916–18: Lawrence Sets Arabia Ablaze. Publisher:Bloomsbury USA. ISBN 9781846033391. - Total pages: 96
- Wilson, Jeremy (1990). Lawrence of Arabia. Athenaeum. ISBN 9780689119347. - Total pages: 1188
