= Rustam Haidar =

Iraqi politician (1889 – 1940)

- رستم حيدر
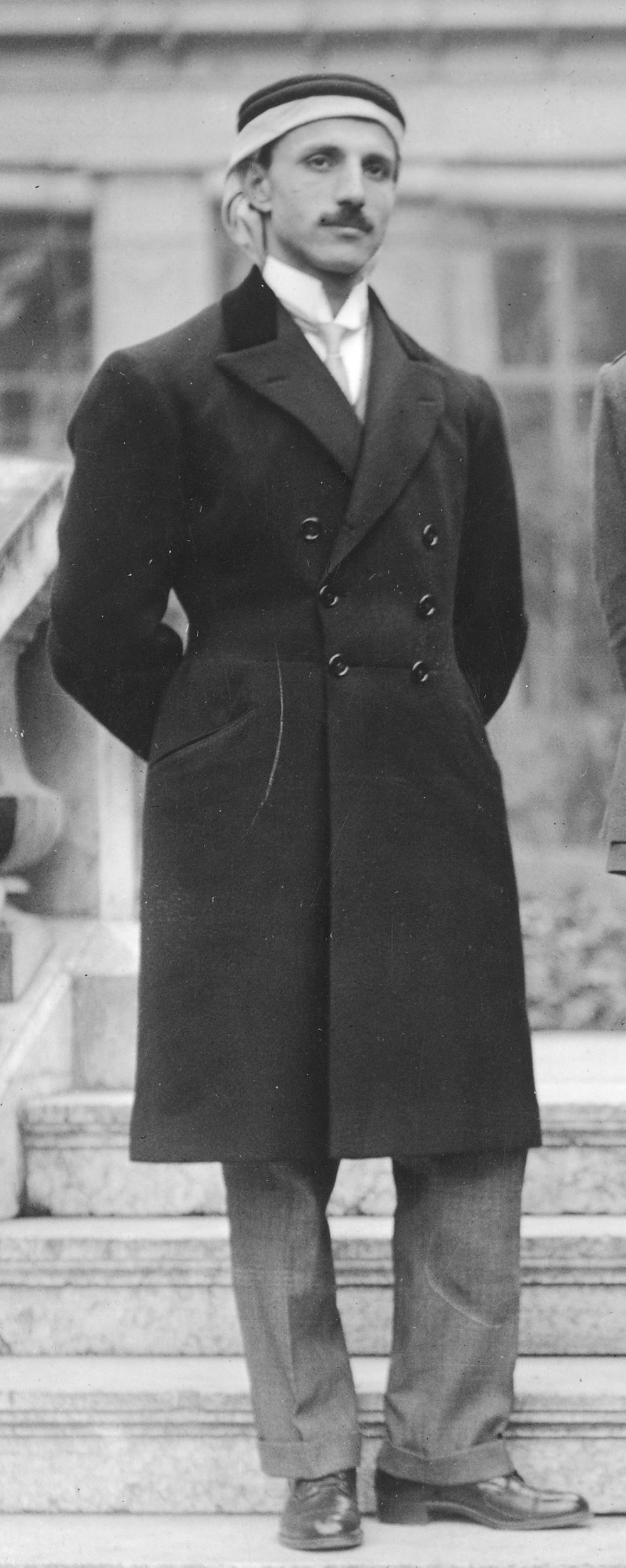

Minister of Finance
- In office December 25, 1938 – January 22, 1940
- Monarch: King Faisal II
- Prime Minister: Nuri al-Said
- Preceded by: Ra'ouf al-Bahrani
- Succeeded by: Mustafa Mahmud al-Umari

Minister of Finance
- In office September 30, 1930 – November 3, 1932
- Prime Minister: Nuri al-Said
- Preceded by: Ali Jawdat al-Ayyubi
- Succeeded by: Nusrat al-Farsi

Personal details
- Born: 1889 Baalbek, Ottoman Empire
- Died: 1940 (aged 50–51)
- Resting place: Iraqi Royal Cemetery
- Occupation: King Faisal I's aide; Politician; Economist

Rustam Haidar (Arabic: رستم حيدر; 1889 – 22 January 1940) was an Iraqi politician of Lebanese descent, who served as Minister of Finance of the Kingdom of Iraq from 1930 to 1932 and from 1938 to 1940. He also was an aide to King Faisal I, Defense Minister, and Finance Minister of Iraq. Rustam Haidar is considered an important figure in the history of the modern Iraqi state and worked in many Iraqi ministries despite being of Lebanese origin. Joining the forces of Faisal I, he was a companion of the young emir throughout his life until his death during a trip to Switzerland. Seven years later, Haidar was subjected to a mysterious assassination and was buried next to King Faisal I at the Iraqi Royal Cemetery in Baghdad.

== Early education and career ==
Muhammad bin Rustam bin Ali Haider was born in 1889 in the Lebanese city of Baalbek under the Ottoman Empire to a well-known family, which originated from the Shia Arab Bani Asad tribe. Much of his childhood is unknown but Haidar attended and studied primary, middle and high school studies. He completed his studies in Constantinople at the Shahani School and graduated in 1910. Then he traveled to Paris and studied at the University of Paris and worked in and founded al-Fatat society along with his two colleagues, Awni Abd al-Hadi, a law student, and Ahmed Qadri, a medical student, with the motivation of spreading a nationalistic spirit. Furthermore, he worked in other political and national fields. Haidar later obtained a high grade from the university and returned to Baalbek in 1913 to work in the education fields. During World War I, Rustam worked as a history and economics teacher in Jerusalem.

During the height of the Arab Revolt which was led against the Ottomans, Haidar decided to join the forces of Faisal I due to being a founding member of al-Fatat Society. He helped head the military campaign heading to the Levant to expel the Ottoman army with direct support from European forces. Because of his background, Haidar was described as "calm in nature and extremely intelligent." After his work in the revolt, Rustam Haidar managed to rise to major positions under the rule of King Faisal I, even after Faisal I was crowned as King of Iraq. By this point, Haidar became the King's private and trusted advisor and secretary and was the writer of the King's speeches and statements and the confidant of his secrets. On November 22, 1918, he left with Faisal I, heading to Paris to attend the Paris Peace Conference. They were accompanied by Nuri al-Said, Dr. Ahmed Qadri, and Fayez al-Fusain, and then they left for London on January 7, 1919. Haidar first set soil in Iraq on June 23, 1921, along with Faisal I after they departed the "Northbrook" ship. After that, Haidar acquired Iraqi citizenship in accordance with the new law, which was written down by the newly crowned King Faisal I, and remained in the service of the Kingdom of Iraq as head of the newly established royal court. Haidar lived in al-Karkh in a simple house with a rent of only 3 dinars.

== Political career ==
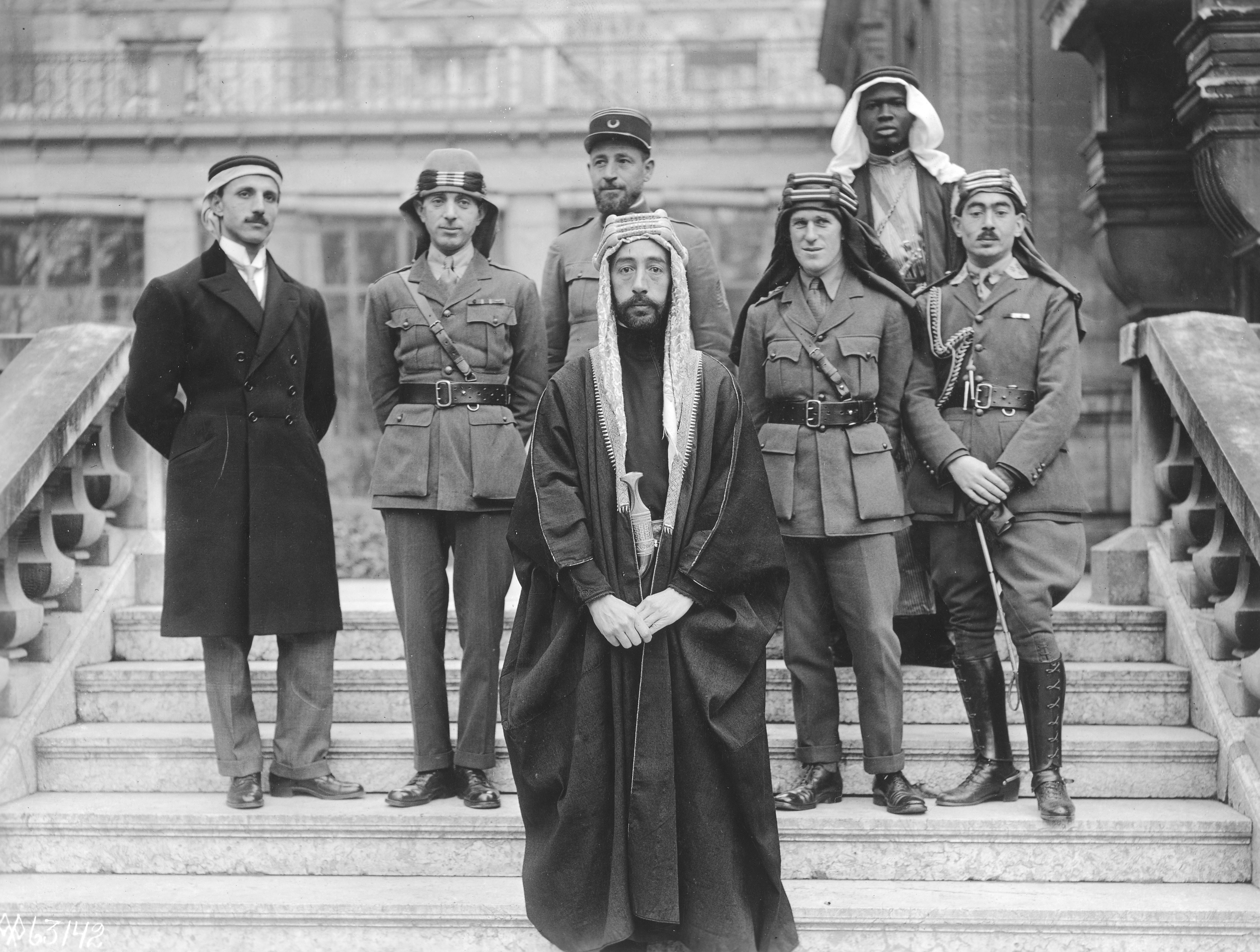
Emir Faisal's delegation at Versailles, during the Paris Peace Conference of 1919. Left to right: Rustum Haidar, Nuri al-Said, Emir Faisal, Captain Pisani (behind Faisal), T. E. Lawrence, Faisal's servant, Captain Tahsin Kadry.

Rustam Haidar worked as an Iraqi minister seven times, and lastly as the minister of finance where he was described as a "brave and solid" person during his service. These ministries included the Minister of Finance, Minister of the Economy, and the Minister of Transportation, as well as working in four ministries headed by Nuri al-Said, and the other two of them during the period of former Prime Minister Rashid Ali al-Gaylani, and one under former Iraqi Prime Minister Jamil al-Midfai. Haidar also supported the integration of Kuwait to Iraq as he referred to Kuwait in one of his speeches as an inseparable part of Basra due to Basra's limited access to the sea.

As the Minister of Finance, he ordered the seizing of King Faisal I's funds after Haidar had issued a new law to collect overdue debts to the government, and most of those who delayed collecting debts were influential people. These included ministers and tribal sheikhs. The law was first taken into action by Haidar on the private royal treasury. In addition to other positions, in 1929, he was the first diplomatic representative of Iraq in Pahlavi Iran. On 20 April 1929, Haidar was dispatched to Tehran after Reza Shah telegrammed King Faisal I congratulating him on achieving independence. He was sent to convey the Shah the King's appreciation for his telegram. The mission was warmly welcomed by the Iranian government and on the 25th, Haidar was received in audience by the Shah who had informed him of recognition of Iraq. Haidar then headed back to Baghdad on the 30th after the mission was concluded with the first Iranian minister appointed to Baghdad, Ayatollah Khan Sami'i. Rustam Haidar also played a role in issuing the Iraqi currency in 1932 for the first time after the Indian rupee was the currency in circulation in Iraq.

Rustam seemed to be interested in the progress that could occur in nations as a result of the efforts of their leaders. He reportedly wrote about Muhammad Ali Pasha of Egypt in his Sorbonne University thesis and apparently pledged King Faisal I to support him in playing a renaissance role in building the new Iraqi nation. Rustam often called on the state to focus most of its attention on education, the health conditions of the people, and the happiness and well-being of the citizens due to over 400 years of Ottoman rule which led the Iraqi people into backwardness. However, due to his honesty, many of the former students of T. E. Lawrence who later worked in the Iraqi government, became troubled by his Shi'i Muslim sect. As such, they pinned accusations of sectarianism on him.

Rustam Haidar, along with Nuri al-Said and Yasin al-Hashimi, accompanied King Faisal I when he was invited by King George V to London, United Kingdom, in the summer of 1933. But the group had to return quickly to Iraq due to the Simele massacre which was carried out by al-Gaylani and Bakr Sidqi. That same year however, King Faisal I and Rustam Haidar had to return to Europe during a treatment trip to Bern, Switzerland. Haidar, along with Ali of Hejaz and Nuri al-Said, were next to Faisal I's deathbed, and listened to his last words before he died suddenly from a heart attack on the morning of September 8, 1933.

Even after the death of King Faisal I, Rustam remained the head of the Royal Court under King Ghazi. During the 1936 Iraqi coup d'état, Haidar helped deliver letters to King Ghazi that were received to him by the coup leaders.

== Personal life ==
Rustam Haidar was an extremely busy person, he lived alone in a residence in Baghdad and was characterized as "a man with no enemies." Rustam remained unmarried throughout his life until his death.

== Assassination ==
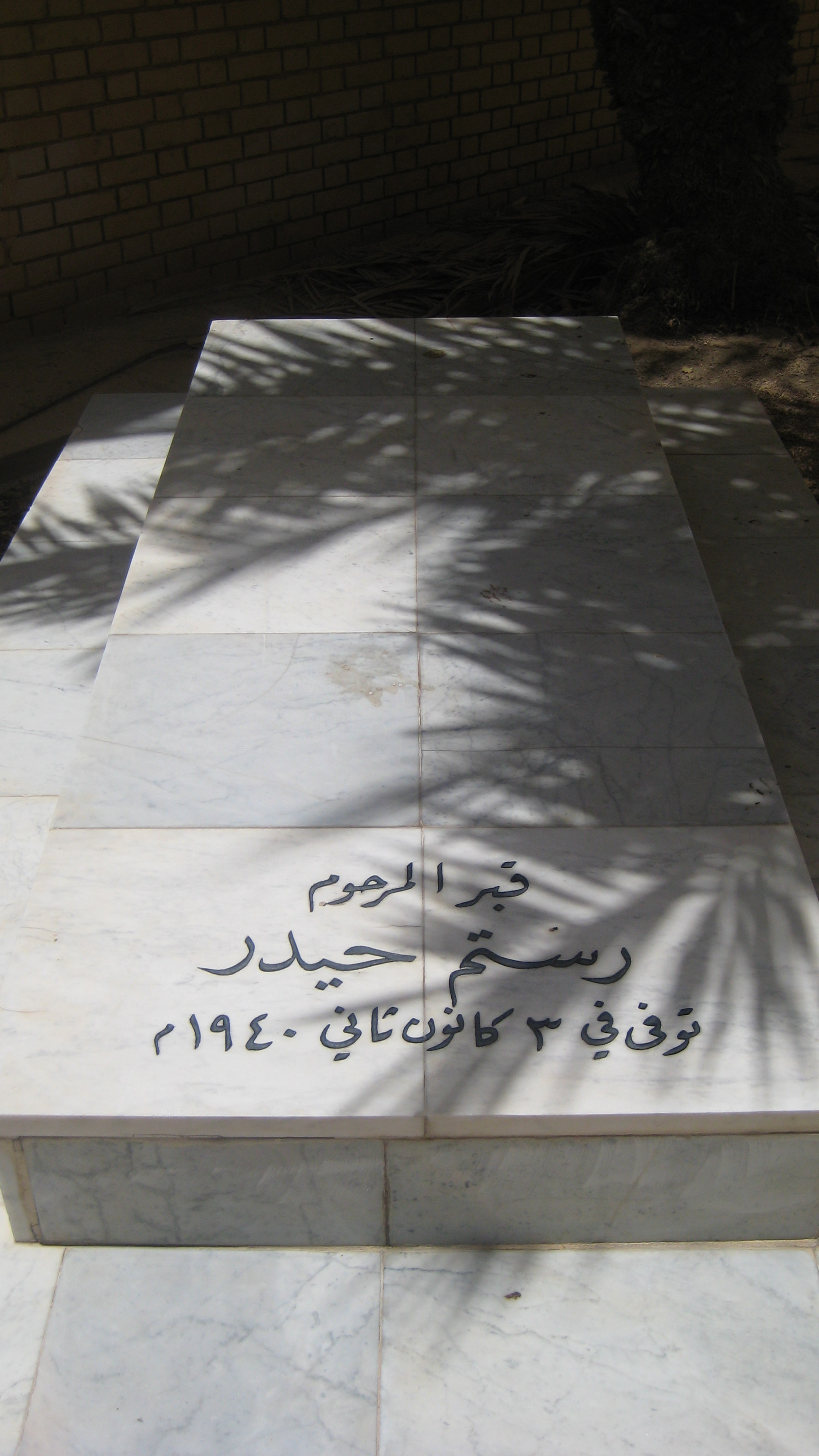
Tomb of Rustam Haidar in the Iraqi Royal Cemetery in Baghdad.

Haidar was targeted by other leading politicians for his faith. On January 18, 1940, at around 11 AM before noon, Haidar was sitting in his office when a dismissed police commissioner named Hussein Fawzi Tawfiq ran into the office and confronted Haidar. Before Haidar could leave the office, he was shot 3 times by Tawfiq on his left side, and he died four days later in the royal hospital from his wounds. This assassination began a widespread political and sectarian social controversy and struggle, as well as materializing many rumors and gossip about the true motives and reasons for the assassination.

The investigation judge of al-Rusafa area at the time, Jamil al-Orfali, immediately rushed to the Royal Hospital to meet up with Haidar but was unable to interrogate him because he was unable to speak due to his condition, so he went to the building of the General Police Directorate because the perpetrator was detained in it. He was interrogated in the presence of the Public Prosecutor and Tawfiq had confessed that he disgruntled with Haidar due to not giving him a job he promised and acted on it all alone.

The government announced the passing of Rustam Haidar much to the shock of the Iraqis. Despite Tawfiq's confession to the crime, opinions on the motive behind the assassinations differ and the events and motives behind the assassination remained a mystery. Some consider it personal, political, or sectarianist in nature. Nevertheless, the killer was executed at dawn on Wednesday, March 27, 1940, by hanging in Bab al-Moatham. After the execution, it was reported that Nuri al-Said rushed to cover what Hussein said before his execution

=== Controversy and theories ===
Due to Rustam Haidar's personality, he was characterized as a "man with no enemies and was not of the violent or confrontational type. Rather, he was generous, kind, and polite to everyone." The events and motives behind his assassination baffled Iraqis. Furthermore, Nuri al-Said's action following the execution of the killer added more suspicion to the controversy. Some noted Haidar's Shi'i Muslim origin as most of the royal class were of Sunni Muslim background. Because of the rise of Nazi Germany at the time and the start of World War II, along with Iraq's important strategic location in such conflict, many also pointed to the possibility that Nazi Germany and its dictator, Adolf Hitler, were behind the assassination. The motive would've been to incite sectarian conflict to weaken the country. Mir Basri noted that Rustam Haidar:

Came to Iraq as a stranger, but he loved the country and its people, and was loyal to his king and his new homeland. He advised the king to unite the people of the country and bring them together under his umbrella without discrimination or tyranny, and he urged him to bring the Shi'ites closer together, educate them, and invite them to participate in governance after they were like strangers during the era of the Sunni Turkish government.

Iraqi historian Abd al-Razzaq al-Hasani mentioned in his book “The History of the Iraqi Ministries, Part 5” that he “understood from Salih Jabr that Rustam Haider had fallen victim to a conspiracy hatched by Nuri al-Said’s opponents to weaken his ministry, or that the Germans were the ones who planned the crime." But some believe that Nuri al-Said had no interest in the assassination, as he was not in enmity with Rustam Haider, but rather hired Haidar in every ministry he had until his assassination.

At the time, Minister of Defense, Taha al-Hashimi, wrote in his memoirs about the day of the execution of Hussein Fawzi Tawfik the following:

Saeed Yahya, who attended Executing the sentence against the murderer of Rustam Haidar. He said that the death sentence was not communicated to the criminal until before the hanging, so he chanted for the life of Hitler and chanted for the downfall of Nuri al-Said, who had taught him deviation. I doubted Nuri's behavior towards the criminal. He called him at night without supervision, and then the criminal rushed to confess after Nuri left his room. Whereas before that, he had denied all his incitement and stated that he assassinated Rustam because he believed he would harm Iraq, and that he had not fulfilled her request... I remember that I told Nuri one day that I doubted the Fifth Column’s connection to the assassination incident, and it is possible that the German agents incited the killer.

Salih Jabr wasn't the only person to believe that the Nazis had a hand in the assassination, diplomat Gerald de Gaury frankly attributes the assassination to Nazi Germany which started to intrigue in Iraq in the beginning of World War II. However, de Gaury did not indicate the source on which he based what he said, nor did he support his statement with evidence that could be believed or disproved. Nevertheless, Nuri al-Said took advantage of the incident to attack a number of his political opponents.

== See also ==
- Al-Fatat Society
- British Mandate of Mesopotamia
