= Arab Revolt =

1916–1918 uprising against the Ottoman Turks

Arab Revolt الثورة العربية
- Part of the Middle Eastern theatre of World War I
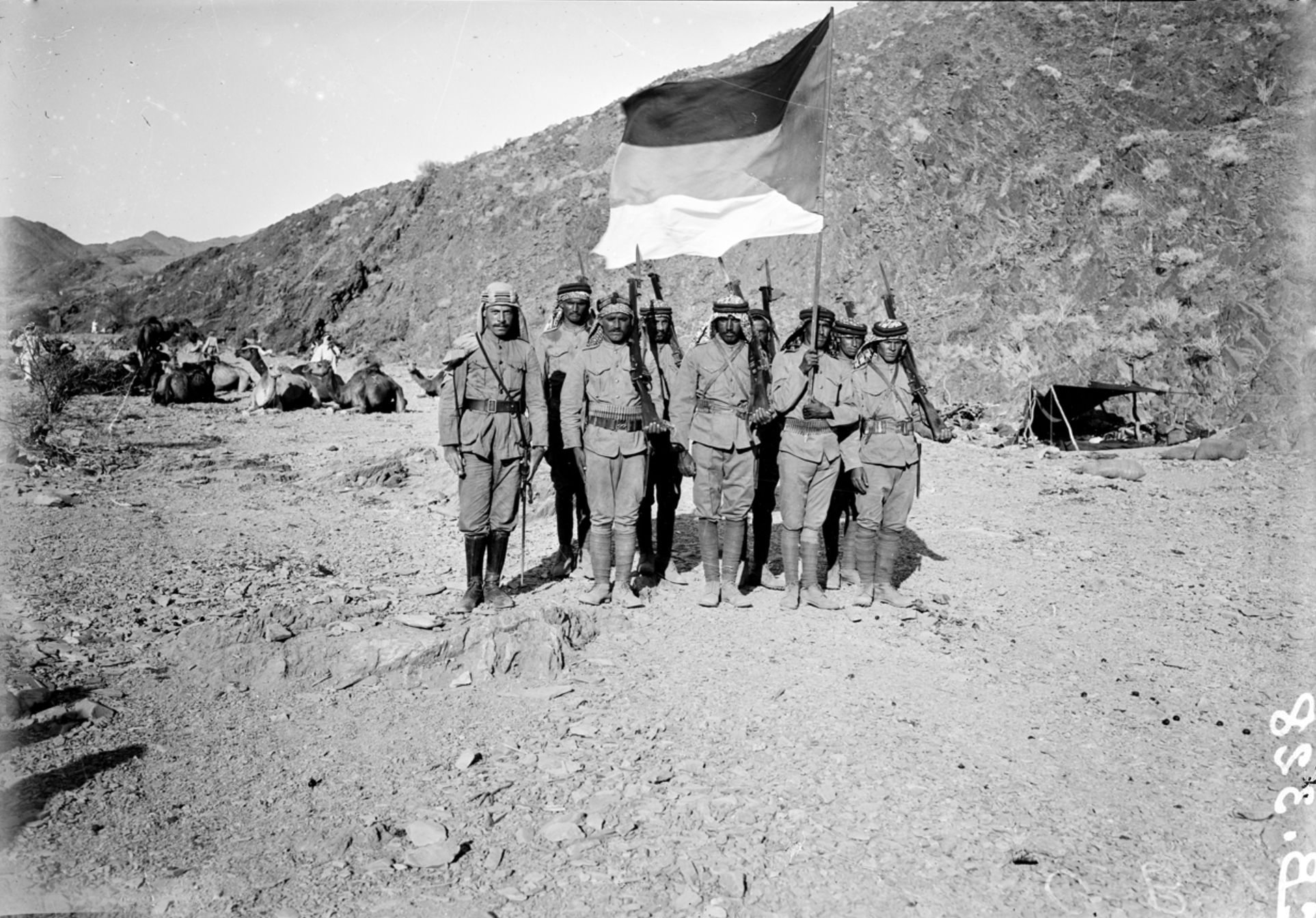
- Soldiers of the Sharifian Army carrying the flag of the Arab Revolt in southern Yanbu
Date	10 June 1916 – 25 October 1918 (2 years, 4 months, 2 weeks and 1 day)
Location	Middle East
Result	Arab rebel victory
Territorial changes	Partition of the Ottoman Empire and Sykes–Picot Agreement: Independence of the Hejaz; British occupation of Palestine and Mesopotamia; French occupation of Syria and Lebanon

Belligerents
Hejaz; other Arab rebels; Supported by: United Kingdom; France	Ottoman Empire; Pro-Ottoman Arabs; Supported by: Jabal Shammar; Al-Muntafiq; Germany

Commanders and leaders
Hussein bin Ali; Faisal bin Hussein; Abdullah bin Hussein; Ali bin Hussein; Zeid bin Hussein; Auda Abu Tayi (WIA); Edmund Allenby; T. E. Lawrence; Édouard Brémond	Djemal Pasha; Fakhri Pasha (POW); Kemal Pasha; Muhiddin Pasha; Recep Peker; Nureddin Pasha; Saud bin Abdulaziz; Ajmi al-Sa'dun (WIA); (German Empire) F. K. von Kressenstein (WIA)

Strength
Total: 100,000+ June 1916: 30,000 troops October 1918: 50,000+ troops	May 1916: 6,500–7,000 troops September 1918: 25,000 troops 340 guns

Casualties and losses
Unknown total: 20,000+ killed	47,000+ total: 5,000 killed; 10,000 wounded; 22,000+ captured; ~10,000 disease-related deaths

The Arab Revolt (Arabic: الثورة العربية al-Thawra al-'Arabiyya), also known as the Great Arab Revolt (الثورة العربية الكبرى al-Thawra al-'Arabiyya al-Kubrā), was an armed uprising by the Hashemite-led Arabs of the Hejaz against the Ottoman Empire amidst the Middle Eastern theatre of World War I.

On the basis of the McMahon–Hussein Correspondence, exchanged between Henry McMahon of the United Kingdom and Hussein bin Ali of the Kingdom of Hejaz, the rebellion against the ruling Turks was officially initiated at Mecca on 10 June 1916. (Note: although his sons 'Ali and Faisal had already initiated operations at Medina starting on 5 June) The primary goal of the Arab rebels was to establish an independent and unified Arab state stretching from Aleppo to Aden, which the British government had promised to recognize.

The Sharifian Army, led by Hussein and the Hashemites with backing from the British military's Egyptian Expeditionary Force, successfully fought and expelled the Ottoman military presence from much of the Hejaz and Transjordan. By 1918, the rebels had captured Damascus and proclaimed the Arab Kingdom of Syria, a short-lived monarchy that was led by Hussein's son Faisal I.

The Arab-majority Ottoman territories of the Middle East were broken up into a number of League of Nations mandates, jointly controlled by the British and the French. Amidst the partition of the Ottoman Empire, the defeated Ottomans' mainland in Anatolia came under a joint military occupation by the victorious Allies. This was gradually broken by the Turkish War of Independence, which established the present-day Republic of Turkey.

Most Arabs in the Ottoman territories stayed loyal to the local Ottoman authorities, and did not join or support the revolt of Hussein bin Ali. Hussein bin Ali's Arab Revolt army did not play a decisive military role in the war. The liberation was led primarily by British and French forces, with the Arab Revolt forces playing a more limited supporting role.

== Name ==
The uprising is conventionally known as the Arab Revolt or the Great Arab Revolt, but its name and the extent of its representative character have been disputed by historians. Aviel Roshwald argues that the designation Arab Revolt is misleading because the uprising was centred on Sharif Hussein and his Hashemite supporters in the Hejaz, rather than constituting a general rebellion by the Ottoman Empire's Arab population. Nuri Yeşilyurt instead uses the term Hijaz Revolt, arguing that it did not represent an overwhelming expression of Arab or Islamic opposition to the Ottoman Empire, but was primarily a local reaction supported by Britain.

The designation Sharifian Revolt is also used in academic literature to emphasise the leadership of Sharif Hussein and the Hashemites. Efraim and Inari Karsh likewise questioned the expanded designation Great Arab Revolt, interpreting the uprising principally as a Hashemite dynastic project rather than as a movement representative of the Arab Ottoman population as a whole.

== Background ==
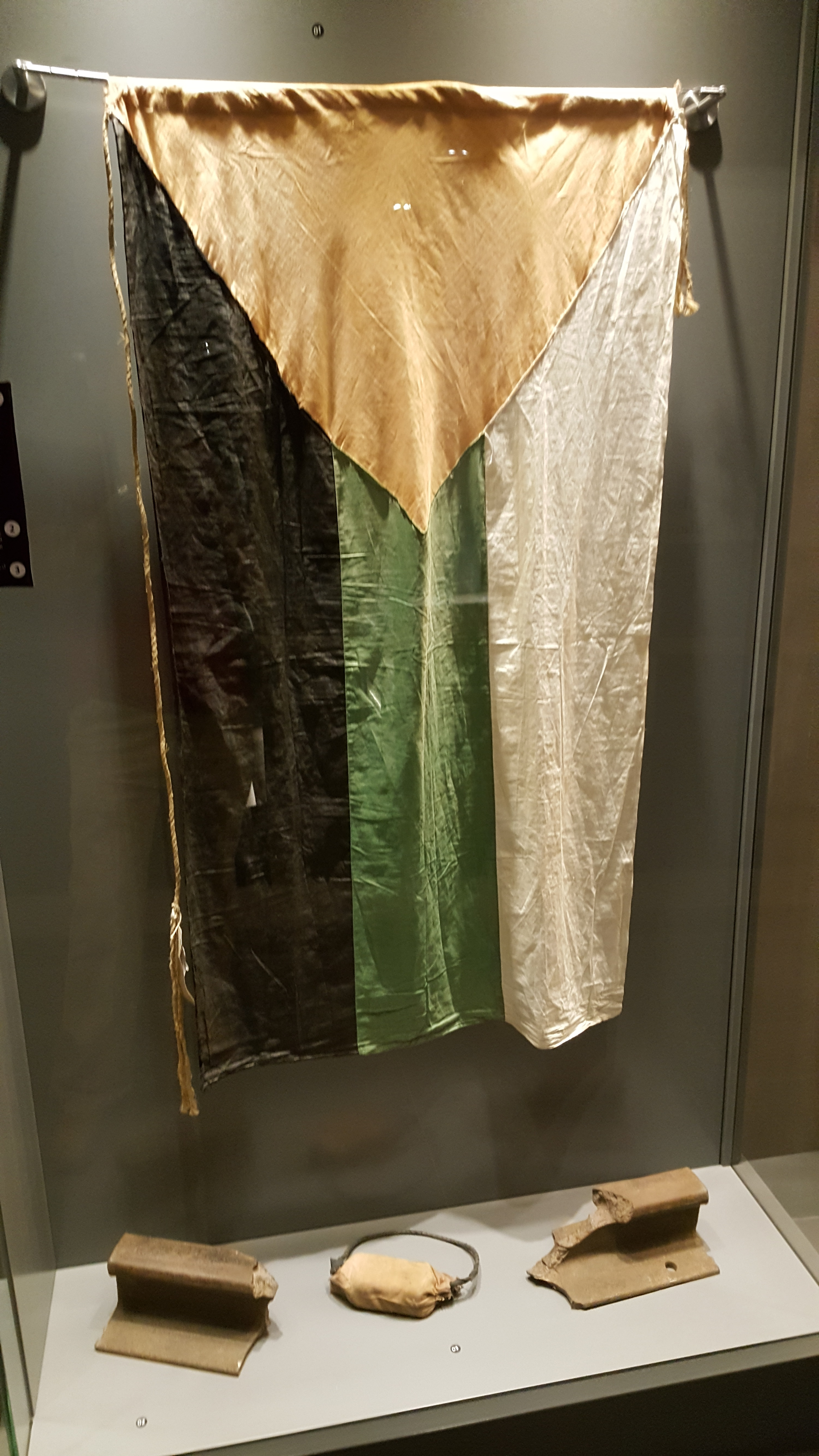
The flag of the Arab Revolt in the Martyrs' Memorial, Amman, Jordan.

The rise of nationalism in the Ottoman Empire dates from at least 1821. Arab nationalism has its roots in the Mashriq, the Arab lands east of Egypt, particularly in countries of the Levant. The political orientation of Arab nationalists before World War I was generally moderate. Their demands were of a reformist nature and generally limited to autonomy, a greater use of Arabic in education and changes in peacetime conscription in the Ottoman Empire to allow Arab conscripts local service in the Ottoman army.

The Young Turk Revolution began on 3 July 1908 and quickly spread throughout the empire. As a result, Sultan Abdul Hamid II was forced to announce the restoration of the 1876 constitution and the reconvening of the Ottoman parliament. The period is known as the Second Constitutional Era. In the 1908 elections, the Young Turks' Committee of Union and Progress (CUP) managed to gain the upper hand against the Liberal Union, led by Sultanzade Sabahaddin. The new parliament had 142 Turks, 60 Arabs, 25 Albanians, 23 Greeks, 12 Armenians (including four Dashnaks and two Hunchaks), five Jews, four Bulgarians, three Serbs and one Vlach.

The CUP now gave more emphasis to centralisation and modernisation. It preached a message that was a mixture of pan-Islamism, Ottomanism, and pan-Turkism, which was adjusted as the conditions warranted. At heart, the CUP were Turkish nationalists who wanted to see the Turks as the dominant group within the Ottoman Empire, which antagonised Arab leaders and prompted them to think in similarly nationalistic terms.

Arab members of the parliament supported the countercoup of 1909, which aimed to dismantle the constitutional system and to restore the absolute monarchy of Sultan Abdul Hamid II. The dethroned sultan attempted to restore the Ottoman Caliphate by putting an end to the secular policies of the Young Turks. He was driven away to exile in Selanik by the 31 March Incident, in which the Young Turks defeated the countercoup. He was eventually replaced by his brother Mehmed V.

In 1913, intellectuals and politicians from the Mashriq met in Paris at the First Arab Congress. They produced a set of demands for greater autonomy and equality within the Ottoman Empire, including for elementary and secondary education in Arab lands to be delivered in Arabic, for peacetime Arab conscripts to the Ottoman army to serve near their home region and for at least three Arab ministers in the Ottoman cabinet.

== Forces ==
It is estimated that the Arab forces involved in the revolt numbered around 5,000 soldiers. This number probably applies to the Arab regulars who fought during the Sinai and Palestine campaign with Edmund Allenby's Egyptian Expeditionary Force, and not the irregular forces under the direction of T. E. Lawrence and Faisal, though other sources place this number lower, at 2,000-3,500 soldiers. On a few occasions, particularly during the final campaign into Syria, this number grew significantly. The Arab Bureau of the British Empire in Cairo believed that the revolt would draw the support of all Arabs throughout the Ottoman Empire and Arab lands.

Faisal and Sharif Hussein reportedly expected to be joined by 100,000 Arab troops. The large desertions predicted by the British Arab Bureau never materialized, as the majority of Arab officers remained loyal to the Ottomans until the end. Many Arabs joined the Revolt sporadically, often as a campaign was in progress, or only when the fighting entered their home region. During the Battle of Aqaba, for instance, while the initial Arab force numbered only a few hundred, over a thousand more from local tribes joined them for the final assault on Aqaba. Estimates of Faisal's effective forces vary, but through most of 1918 at least, they may have numbered as high as 30,000 men, though it is claimed that the initial forces numbered at 70,000, and even 100,000+.

The Hashemite Army comprised two distinctive forces: tribal irregulars who waged a guerrilla war against the Ottoman Empire and the Sharifian Army, which was recruited from Ottoman Arab POWs and fought in conventional battles. Hashemite forces were initially poorly equipped, but later received significant supplies of weapons, most notably rifles and machine guns from Britain and France.

In the early days of the revolt, Faisal's forces were largely made up of Bedouins and other nomadic desert tribes, who were only loosely allied, loyal more to their respective tribes than the overall cause. The Bedouin would not fight unless paid in advance with gold coin. By the end of 1916, the French had spent 1.25 million gold francs in subsidizing the revolt. By September 1918, the British were spending £220,000/month to subsidize the revolt.

Faisal had hoped that he could convince Arab troops serving in the Ottoman Army to mutiny and join his cause, but the Ottoman government sent most of its Arab troops to the Western front-lines of the war, and thus only a handful of deserters actually joined the Arab forces until later in the campaign.

By the beginning of the First World War, Arab conscripts constituted about 30% of the wartime Ottoman military of 3 million, serving in all ranks, from the lowest to the highest, and forming a crucial component of the Ottoman Army. Ottoman troops in the Hejaz numbered 20,000 men by 1917. At the outbreak of the revolt in June 1916, the VII Corps of the Fourth Army was stationed in the Hejaz. It was joined by the 58th Infantry Division, commanded by Lieutenant-Colonel Ali Necib Pasha, the 1st Kuvvie- Mürettebe (Provisional Force) led by General Mehmed Cemal Pasha, which had the responsibility of safeguarding the Hejaz railway and the Hejaz Expeditionary Force (Turkish: Hicaz Kuvve-i Seferiyesi), which was under the command of General Fakhri Pasha.

In face of increasing attacks on the Hejaz railway, the 2nd Kuvve i Mürettebe was created by 1917. The Ottoman force included a number of Arab units who stayed loyal to the Sultan-Caliph and fought well against the Allies. (Note: During the First World War, between 100,000 and 300,000 Arabs served in the Ottoman Army.)

The Ottoman troops enjoyed an advantage over the Hashemite troops at first, in that they were well supplied with modern German weapons. The Ottoman forces had the support of both the Ottoman Aviation Squadrons, air squadrons from Germany and the Ottoman Gendarmerie or zaptı. The Ottomans relied upon the support of Emir Saud bin Abdulaziz Al Rashid of the Emirate of Jabal Shammar, whose tribesmen dominated what is now northern Saudi Arabia, and tied down both the Hashemites and Saʻudi forces with the threat of their raiding attacks.

The great weakness of the Ottoman forces was they were at the end of a long and tenuous supply line in the form of the Hejaz railway, and because of their logistical weaknesses, were often forced to fight on the defensive. Ottoman offensives against the Hashemite forces more often faltered due to supply problems than to the actions of the enemy.

The main contribution of the Arab Revolt to the war was to pin down tens of thousands of Ottoman troops who otherwise might have been used to attack the Suez Canal and to conquer Damascus, allowing the British to undertake offensive operations with a lower risk of counter-attack. This was the British justification for supporting the revolt, a textbook example of asymmetric warfare that has been studied time and again by military leaders and historians alike.

== History ==
=== Revolt ===
The Ottoman Empire took part in the Middle Eastern theatre of World War I, under the terms of the Ottoman–German Alliance. Many Arab nationalist figures in Damascus and Beirut were arrested, then tortured. The flag of the resistance was designed by Sir Mark Sykes, in an effort to create a feeling of "Arab-ness", in order to fuel the revolt.

==== Prelude (November 1914 – October 1916) ====
Outline map of Hejaz

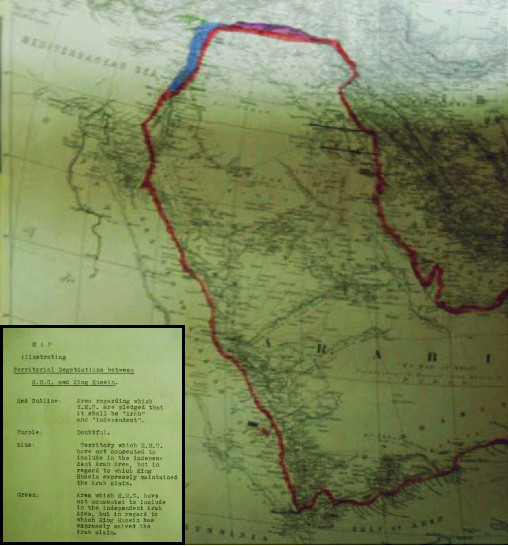
1918 British government map: Map illustrating Territorial Negotiations between H.M.G. and King Hussein.

When Herbert Kitchener was Consul-General in Egypt, contacts between Abdullah and Kitchener culminated in a telegram of 1 November 1914 from Kitchener, recently appointed as Secretary of War, to Hussein, wherein Britain would, in exchange for support from the Arabs of Hejaz, "guarantee the independence, rights and privileges of the Sharifate against all foreign external aggression, in particular that of the Ottomans." The Sharif indicated that he could not break with the Ottomans immediately, and it did not happen till the following year.

From 14 July 1915, to 10 March 1916, ten letters, five from each side, were exchanged between Sir Henry McMahon and Sherif Hussein. Hussein's letter of 18 February 1916 appealed to McMahon for £50,000 in gold, plus weapons, ammunition, and food. Faisal claimed that he was awaiting the arrival of 'not less than 100,000 people' for the planned revolt. McMahon's reply of 10 March 1916 confirmed British agreement to the requests and concluded the correspondence.

Hussein, who until then had officially been on the Ottoman side, was now convinced that his assistance to the Triple Entente would be rewarded by an Arab empire, encompassing the entire span between Egypt and Qajar Iran, with the exception of imperial possessions and interests in Kuwait, Aden, and the Syrian coast. He decided to join the Allied camp immediately, because of rumours that he would soon be deposed as Sharif of Mecca by the Ottoman government in favor of Sharif Ali Haidar, leader of the rival Zaʻid family. The much-publicized executions of the Arab nationalist leaders in Damascus led Hussein to fear for his life if he were deposed in favour of Ali Haidar.

Hussein had about 50,000 men under arms, but fewer than 10,000 had rifles. On 5 June 1916, two of Hussein's sons, the emirs ʻAli and Faisal, began the revolt by attacking the Ottoman garrison in Medina, but were defeated by an aggressive Turkish defence, led by Fakhri Pasha. The revolt proper began on 10 June 1916, when Hussein ordered his supporters to attack the Ottoman garrison in Mecca. In the Battle of Mecca, there ensued over a month of bloody street fighting between the out-numbered, but far better armed Ottoman troops and Hussein's tribesmen. Hashemite forces in Mecca were joined by Egyptian troops sent by the British, who provided much needed artillery support, and took Mecca on 9 July 1916.

Indiscriminate Ottoman artillery fire, which did much damage to Mecca, turned out to be a potent propaganda weapon for the Hashemites, who portrayed the Ottomans as desecrating Islam's most holy city. Also on 10 June, another of Hussein's sons, the Emir Abdullah, attacked Ta'if, which after an initial repulse, settled down into a siege. With the Egyptian artillery support, Abdullah took Ta'if on 22 September 1916.

French and British naval forces cleared the Red Sea of Ottoman gunboats early in the war. The port of Jeddah was attacked by 3,500 Arabs on 10 June 1916 with the assistance of bombardment by British warships and seaplanes. The seaplane carrier HMS Ben-my-Chree, provided crucial air support to the Hashemite forces. The Ottoman garrison surrendered on 16 June. By the end of September 1916, the Sharifian Army had taken the coastal cities of Rabigh, Yanbu, al Qunfudhah, and 6,000 Ottoman prisoners with the assistance of the Royal Navy.

The capture of the Red Sea ports allowed the British to send over a force of 700 Ottoman Arab POWs, who primarily came from what is now Iraq, who had decided to join the revolt led by Nuri al-Saʻid and a number of Muslim troops from French North Africa. Fifteen thousand well-armed Ottoman troops remained in the Hejaz. A direct attack on Medina in October resulted in a bloody repulse of the Arab forces.

==== Arrival of T. E. Lawrence (October 1916 – January 1917) ====
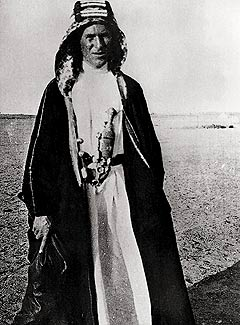
Lawrence at Rabegh, north of Jeddah, 1917.

In June 1916, the British sent out a number of officials to assist the revolt in the Hejaz, most notably Colonel Cyril Wilson, Colonel Pierce C. Joyce, and Lt-Colonel Stewart Francis Newcombe. Herbert Garland was also involved. In addition, a French military mission commanded by Colonel Édouard Brémond was sent out. The French enjoyed an advantage over the British in that they included a number of Muslim officers, such as Captain Muhammand Ould Ali Raho, Claude Prost, and Laurent Depui. The latter two converted to Islam during their time in Arabia. Captain Rosario Pisani of the French Army, though not a Muslim, played a notable role in the revolt as an engineering and artillery officer with the Arab Northern Army.

In October 1916, the British government in Egypt sent a young officer, Captain T. E. Lawrence, to work with the Hashemite forces in the Hejaz. Lawrence arrived in Jeddah together with Ronald Storrs, Secretary for the Orient at the Cairo Residency and Sir Henry McMahon's trusted aide in the delicate negotiations with Sharif Hussein bin Ali.

Lawrence judged that there was potential for success for the rebels in the war against the Ottomans if the British cooperated with Feisal and equipped the rebels with more modern weapons and weapon specialists. Lawrence traveled to Cairo and submitted a long report to his superior and to General Reginald Wingate. The British historian David Murphy wrote that though Lawrence was just one of many British and French officers serving in Arabia, historians often write as though Lawrence alone represented the Allied cause in Arabia.

David Hogarth credited Gertrude Bell for much of the success of the Arab Revolt. She had travelled extensively in the Middle East since 1888 after graduating from Oxford with a First in Modern History. Bell met Sheikh Harb of the Howeitat in January 1914 and thus was able to provide a "mass of information" which was crucial to the success of Lawrence's occupation of Aqaba, covering the "tribal elements ranging between the Hejaz Railway and the Nefud, particularly about the Howeitat group." It was this information, Hogarth emphasized, which "Lawrence, relying on her reports, made signal use of in the Arab campaigns of 1917 and 1918."

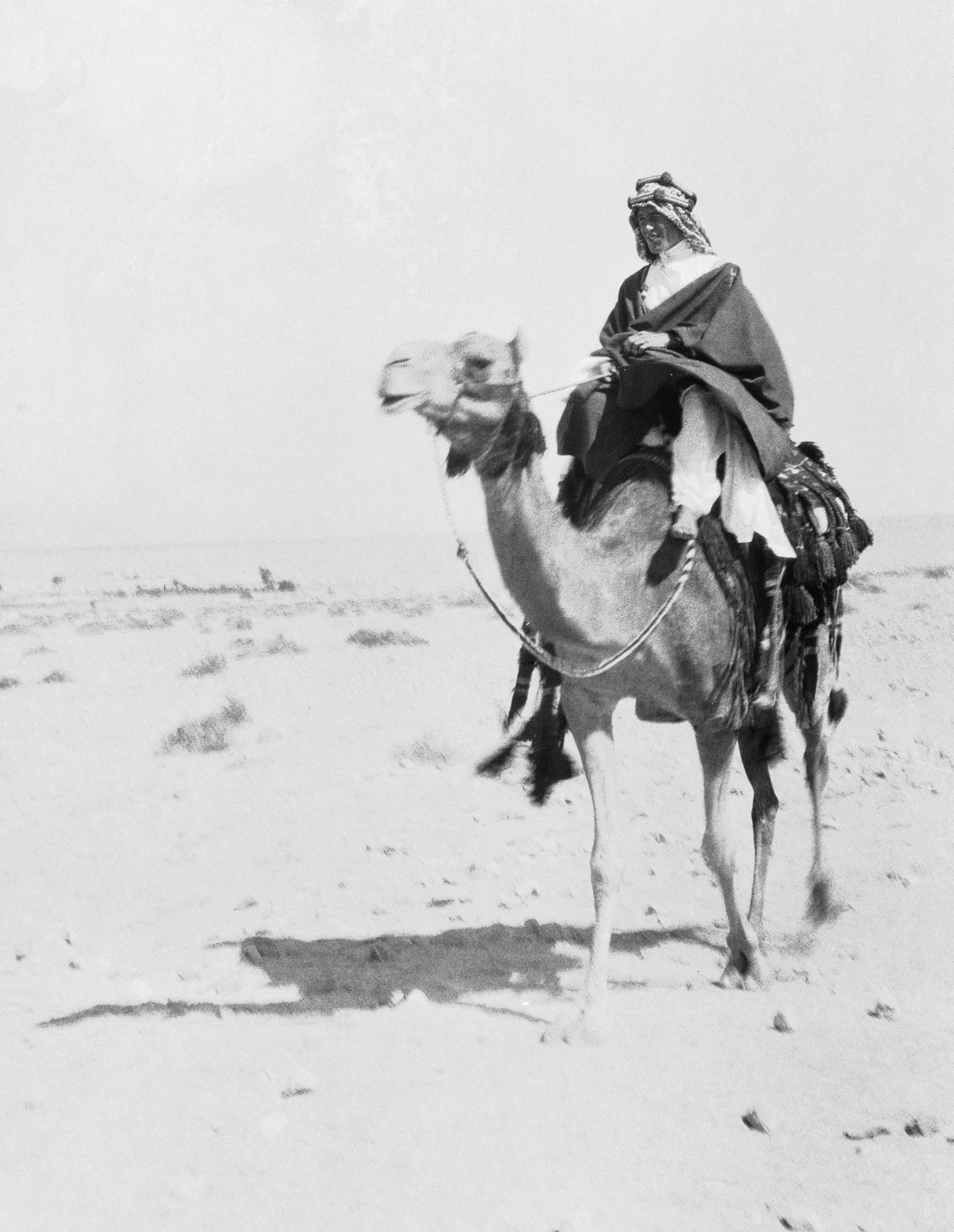
Lawrence of Arabia after the Battle of Aqaba.

Lawrence obtained assistance from the Royal Navy to turn back an Ottoman attack on Yenbu in December 1916. Lawrence's major contribution to the revolt was convincing the Arab leaders, Faisal and Abdullah, to coordinate their actions in support of British strategy. Lawrence developed a close relationship with Faisal, whose Arab Northern Army was to become the main beneficiary of British aid.

Since Lawrence's relations with Abdullah were not as good, Abdullah's Arab Eastern Army received considerably less in way of British aid. Lawrence persuaded the Arabs not to drive the Ottomans out of Medina. Instead, the Arabs attacked the Hejaz railway on many occasions. This tied up more Ottoman troops, who were forced to protect the railway and repair the constant damage.

On 1 December 1916, Fakhri Pasha began an offensive with three brigades out of Medina, with the aim of taking the port of Yanbu. At first, Fakhri's troops defeated the Hashemite forces in several engagements, and seemed set to take Yanbu. On 11–12 December 1916, it was fire and air support from the five ships of the Royal Navy Red Sea Patrol that defeated the Ottoman attempts to take Yanbu, with heavy losses. Fakhri then turned his forces south to take Rabegh, but owing to the guerrilla attacks on his flanks and supply lines, air attacks from the newly established Royal Flying Corps base at Yanbu, and the over-extension of his supply lines, he was forced to turn back on 18 January 1917, to Medina.

The coastal city of Wejh was to be the base for attacks on the Hejaz railway. On 3 January 1917, Faisal began an advance northward along the Red Sea coast with 5,100 camel riders, 5,300 men on foot, four Krupp mountain guns, ten machine guns, and 380 baggage camels. The Royal Navy resupplied Faisal from the sea during his march on Wejh. While the 800-man Ottoman garrison prepared for an attack from the south, a landing party of 400 Arabs and 200 Royal Navy bluejackets attacked Wejh from the north on 23 January 1917. Wejh surrendered within 36 hours, and the Ottomans abandoned their advance toward Mecca in favor of a defensive position in Medina, with small detachments scattered along the Hejaz railway.

The Arab force had increased to about 70,000 men, armed with 28,000 rifles and deployed in three main groups. Ali's force threatened Medina, Abdullah operated from Wadi Ais harassing Ottoman communications and capturing their supplies, and Faisal based his force at Wejh. Camel-mounted Arab raiding parties had an effective radius of 1,000 miles (1,600 km), carrying their own food and taking water from a system of wells approximately 100 miles (160 km) apart.

In late 1916, the Allies started the formation of the Regular Arab Army, also known as the Sharifian Army, raised from Ottoman Arab POWs. The soldiers of the Regular Army wore British-style uniforms with the keffiyahs and, unlike the tribal guerrillas, fought full-time and in conventional battles. Some of the more notable former Ottoman officers to fight in the Revolt were Nuri as-Said, Ja'far al-Askari and 'Aziz 'Ali al-Misri.

==== Northward expeditions (January–November 1917) ====
The Hejaz railway, on the Damascus-Mecca pilgrim route, built at great expense by the Ottoman Empire in the early 20th century. It quickly fell into disrepair after the Arab revolt of 1917.

The year 1917 began well for the Hashemites, when the Emir Abdullah and his Arab Eastern Army ambushed an Ottoman convoy led by Ashraf Bey in the desert, and captured £20,000 worth of gold coins that were intended to bribe the Bedouin into loyalty to the Sultan. Starting in early 1917, the Hashemite guerrillas began attacking the Hejaz railway. At first, guerrilla forces commanded by officers from the Regular Army such as al-Misri, and by British officers such as Newcombe, Lieutenant Hornby and Major Herbert Garland focused their efforts on blowing up unguarded sections of the Hejaz railway. Garland was the inventor of the so-called "Garland mine", which was used with much destructive force on the Hejaz railway.

In February 1917, Garland succeeded for the first time in destroying a moving locomotive with a mine of his own design. In February 1917, around Medina, Captain Muhammad Ould Ali Raho of the French Military Mission carried out his first railway demolition attack. Captain Raho emerged as one of the leading destroyers of the Hejaz railway. In March 1917, Lawrence led his first attack on the Hejaz railway. Typical of such attacks was the one commanded by Newcombe and Joyce, who on the night of 6/7 July 1917, planted over 500 charges on the Hejaz railway, which all went off at about 2 am. In a raid in August 1917, Captain Raho led a force of Bedouin in destroying 5 kilometers of the Hejaz railway and four bridges.

In March 1917, an Ottoman force joined by tribesmen from Jabal Shammar led by Ibn Rashid carried out a sweep of the Hejaz, that did much damage to the Hashemite forces. However, the Ottoman failure to take Yanbu in December 1916 led to the increased strengthening of the Hashemite forces, and led to the Ottoman forces to go on the defensive. Lawrence later claimed that the failure of the offensive against Yanbu was the turning point that ensured the ultimate defeat of the Ottomans in the Hejaz.

In 1917, Lawrence arranged a joint action with the Arab irregulars and forces under Auda Abu Tayi, until then, in the employ of the Ottomans, against the port city of Aqaba. This is now known as the Battle of Aqaba. Aqaba was the only remaining Ottoman port on the Red Sea and threatened the right flank of Britain's Egyptian Expeditionary Force defending Egypt, and preparing to advance into Sanjak Maan of the Syria Vilayet. Capture of Aqaba would aid transfer of British supplies to the Arab revolt. Lawrence and Auda left Wejh on 9 May 1917 with a party of 40 men, to recruit a mobile force from the Howeitat, a tribe located in the area. On 6 July, after an overland attack, Aqaba fell to those Arab forces with only a handful of casualties.

Lawrence then rode 150 miles to Suez to arrange Royal Navy delivery of food and supplies for the 2,500 Arabs and 700 Ottoman prisoners in Aqaba. Soon the city was co-occupied by a large Anglo-French flotilla, including warships and sea planes, which helped the Arabs secure their hold on Aqaba. Even as the Hashemite armies advanced, they still encountered sometimes fierce opposition from local residents. In July 1917, residents of the town of Karak fought against the Hashemite forces and turned them back. Later in 1917, British intelligence reports suggested that most of the tribes in the region east of the Jordan River were "firmly in the Ottoman camp." The tribes feared repressions and losing the money they had received from the Ottomans for their loyalty.

Later in 1917, the Hashemite warriors made a series of small raids on Ottoman positions in support of British General Allenby's winter attack on the Gaza–Bersheeba defensive line, which led to the Battle of Beersheba. Typical of such raids was one led by Lawrence in September 1917, that saw Lawrence destroy a Turkish rail convoy by blowing up the bridge it was crossing at Mudawwara and then ambushing the Turkish repair party. In November 1917, as aid to Allenby's offensive, Lawrence launched a deep-raiding party into the Yarmouk River valley, which failed to destroy the railway bridge at Tel ash-Shehab, but succeeded in ambushing and destroying the train of General Mehmed Cemal Pasha, the commander of the Ottoman VII Corps. Allenby's victories led directly to the British capture of Jerusalem just before Christmas 1917.

==== Increased Allied assistance and the end of fighting (November 1917 – October 1918) ====
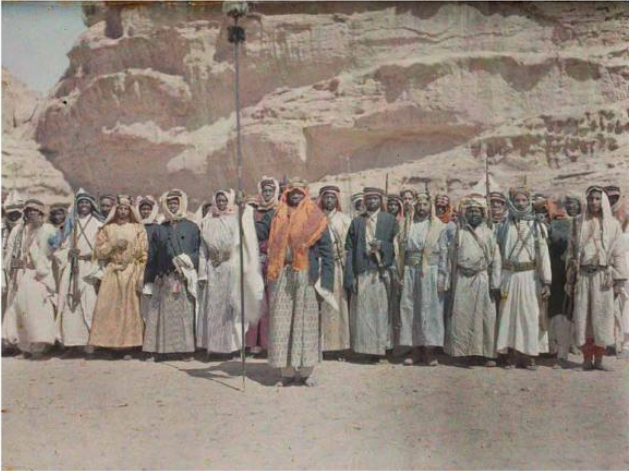
Arab fighters in Aqaba on 28 February 1918. Autochrome colour photograph.

By the time of Aqaba's capture, many other officers joined Faisal's campaign. A large number of British officers and advisors, led by Lt. Col.s Stewart F. Newcombe and Cyril E. Wilson, arrived to provide the Arabs rifles, explosives, mortars, and machine guns. Artillery was only sporadically supplied due to a general shortage, though Faisal had several batteries of mountain guns under French Captain Pisani and his Algerians for the Megiddo Campaign. Egyptian and Indian troops also served with the Revolt, primarily as machine gunners and specialist troops, a number of armoured cars were allocated for use. The Royal Flying Corps often supported the Arab operations, and the Imperial Camel Corps served with the Arabs for a time.

The French military mission of 1,100 officers under Brémond established good relations with Hussein and especially with his sons, the Emirs Ali and Abdullah, and for this reason, most of the French effort went into assisting the Arab Southern Army commanded by the Emir Ali that was laying siege to Medina and the Eastern Army commanded by Abdullah that had the responsibility of protecting Ali's eastern flank from Ibn Rashid. Medina was never taken by the Hashemite forces, and the Ottoman commander, Fakhri Pasha, only surrendered Medina when ordered to by the Turkish government on 9 January 1919. The total number of Ottoman troops bottled up in Medina by the time of the surrender were 456 officers and 9,364 soldiers.

Under the direction of Lawrence, Wilson, and other officers, the Arabs launched a highly successful campaign against the Hejaz railway, capturing military supplies, destroying trains and tracks, and tying down thousands of Ottoman troops. Though the attacks were mixed in success, they achieved their primary goal of tying down Ottoman troops and cutting off Medina. In January 1918, in one of the largest set-piece battles of the Revolt, Arab forces, including Lawrence, defeated a large Ottoman force at the Battle of Tafilah, inflicting over 1,000 Ottoman casualties for the loss of a mere forty men.

In March 1918 the Arab Northern Army consisted of

Arab Regular Army commanded by Ja'far Pasha el Askeri

brigade of infantry
one battalion Camel Corps
one battalion mule-mounted infantry
about eight guns

British Section commanded by Lieutenant Colonel P. C. Joyce

Hejaz Armoured Car Battery of Rolls-Royce light armoured cars with machine guns and two 10-pdr guns on Talbot lorries
one Flight of aircraft
one Company Egyptian Camel Corps
Egyptian Camel Transport Corps
Egyptian Labour Corps
Wireless Station at 'Aqaba

French Detachment commanded by Captain Pisani

two mountain guns
four machine guns and 10 automatic rifles

In April 1918, Ja'far al-Askari and Nuri as-Said led the Arab Regular Army in a frontal attack on the well-defended Ottoman railway station at Ma'an, which after some initial successes was fought off with heavy losses to both sides. However, the Sharifian Army succeeded in cutting off and thus neutralizing the Ottoman position at Ma'an, who held out until late September 1918. The British refused several requests from al-Askari to use mustard gas on the Ottoman garrison at Ma'an.

In the spring of 1918, Operation Hedgehog, a concerted attempt to sever and destroy the Hejaz railway, was launched. In May 1918, Hedgehog led to the destruction of 25 bridges of the Hejaz railway. On 11 May Arab regulars captured Jerdun and 140 prisoners. Five weeks later, on 24 July Nos. 5 and 7 Companies of the Imperial Camel Corps Brigade commanded by Major R. V. Buxton, marched from the Suez Canal to arrive at Aqaba on 30 July, to attack the Mudawwara Station.

A particularly notable attack of Hedgehog was the storming on 8 August 1918, by the Imperial Camel Corps, closely supported by the Royal Air Force, of the well-defended Hejaz railway station at Mudawwara. They captured 120 prisoners and two guns, suffering 17 casualties in the operation. Buxton's two companies of Imperial Camel Corps Brigade continued on towards Amman, where they hoped to destroy the main bridge. 20 miles (32 km) from the city they were attacked by aircraft, forcing them to withdraw eventually back to Beersheba where they arrived on 6 September; a march of 700 miles (1,100 km) in 44 days.

For the final Allied offensive intended to knock the Ottoman Empire out of the war, Allenby asked that Emir Faisal and his Arab Northern Army launch a series of attacks on the main Turkish forces from the east, which was intended to both tie down Ottoman troops and force Turkish commanders to worry about their security of their flanks in the Levant. Supporting the Emir Faisal's army of about 450 men from the Arab Regular Army were tribal contingents from the Rwalla, Bani Sakhr, Agyal, and Howeitat tribes. In addition, Faisal had a group of Gurkha troops, several British armored car squadrons, the Egyptian Camel Corps, a group of Algerian artillery men commanded by Captain Pisani and air support from the RAF to assist him.

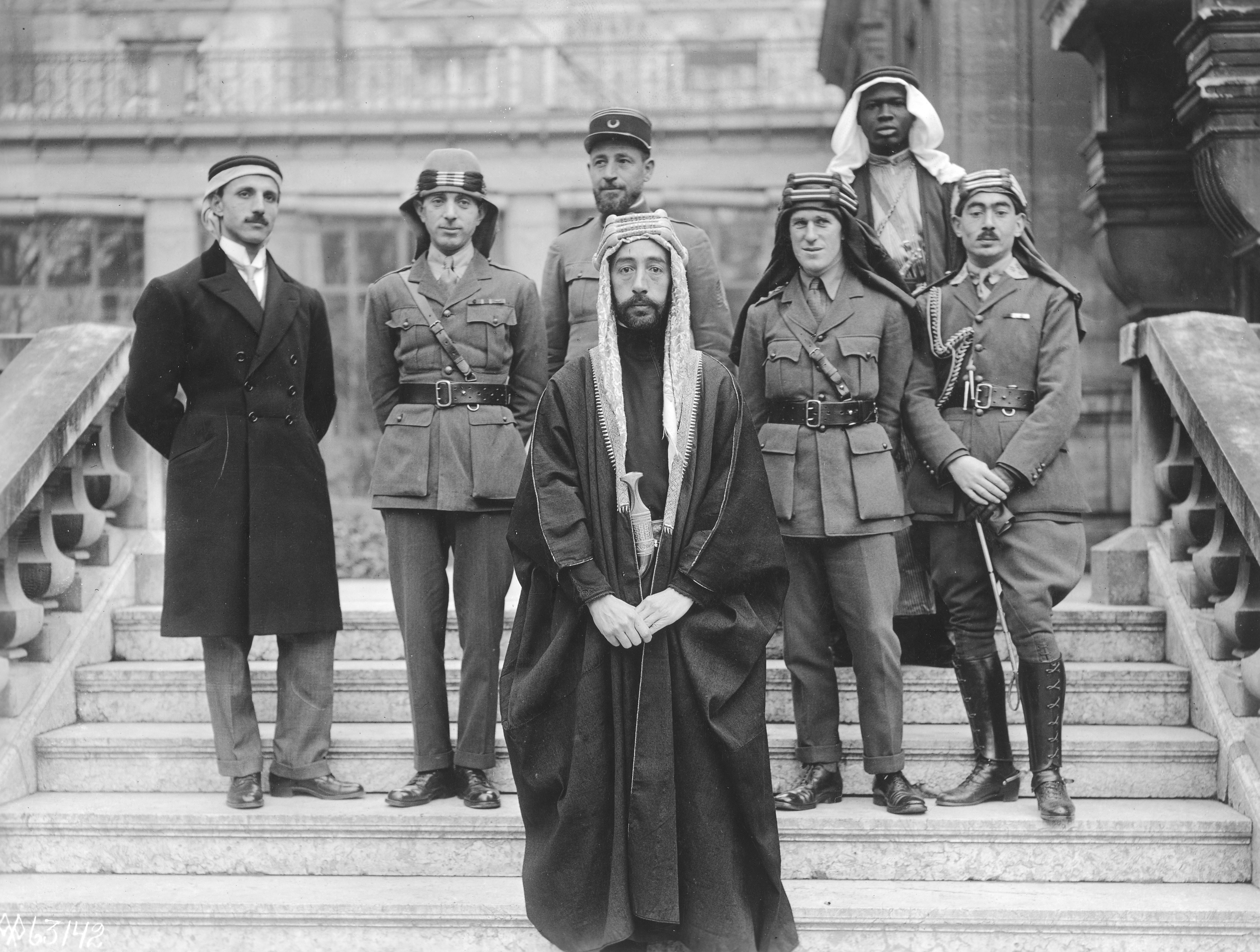
Feisal's party at the Versailles Conference. Left to right: Rustum Haidar, Nuri as-Said, Prince Faisal (front), Captain Rosario Pisani (rear), T. E. Lawrence, unknown member of his delegation (name unknown), Captain Hassan Khadri.

In 1918, the Arab cavalry gained in strength, as it seemed victory was at hand, and they were able to provide Allenby's army with intelligence on Ottoman army positions. They harassed Ottoman supply columns, attacked small garrisons, and destroyed railway tracks. A major victory occurred on 27 September when an entire brigade of Ottoman, Austrian and German troops, retreating from Mezerib, was virtually wiped out in a battle with Arab forces near the village of Tafas, which the Turks had plundered during their retreat.

This led to the so-called Tafas massacre, in which Lawrence claimed in a letter to his brother to have issued a "no-prisoners" order, maintaining after the war that massacre was in retaliation for the earlier Ottoman massacre of the village of Tafas, and that he had at least 250 German and Austrian POWs together with an uncounted number of Turks lined up to be summarily shot. Lawrence later wrote in Seven Pillars of Wisdom that "In a madness born of the horror of Tafas we killed and killed, even blowing in the heads of the fallen and of the animals; as though their death and running blood could slake our agony." In part due to these attacks, Allenby's last offensive, the Battle of Megiddo, was a stunning success.

By late September and October 1918, an increasingly demoralized Ottoman Army began to retreat and surrender whenever possible to British troops. "Sherifial irregulars" accompanied by Lieutenant Colonel T. E. Lawrence captured Deraa on 27 September 1918. The Ottoman army was routed in less than 10 days of battle. Allenby praised Faisal for his role in the victory: "I send your Highness my greetings and my most cordial congratulations upon the great achievement of your gallant troops ... Thanks to our combined efforts, the Ottoman army is everywhere in full retreat."

On 30 September 1918, the first Arab Revolt forces to reach Damascus were Sharif Naser's Hashemite camel cavalry and the cavalry of the Ruwallah tribe, led by Nuri Sha'lan. The bulk of these troops remained outside of the city with the intention of awaiting the arrival of Sharif Faisal. A small contingent from the group was sent within the walls of the city, where they found the Arab Revolt flag already raised by surviving Arab nationalists among the citizenry. Later that day Australian Light Horse troops marched into Damascus. Auda Abu Ta'yi, T. E. Lawrence and Arab troops rode into Damascus the next day, 1 October. At the end of the war, the Egyptian Expeditionary Force had seized Palestine, Transjordan, Lebanon, large parts of the Arabian peninsula and southern Syria. Medina, cut off from the rest of the Ottoman Empire, surrendered in January 1919.

== Aftermath ==
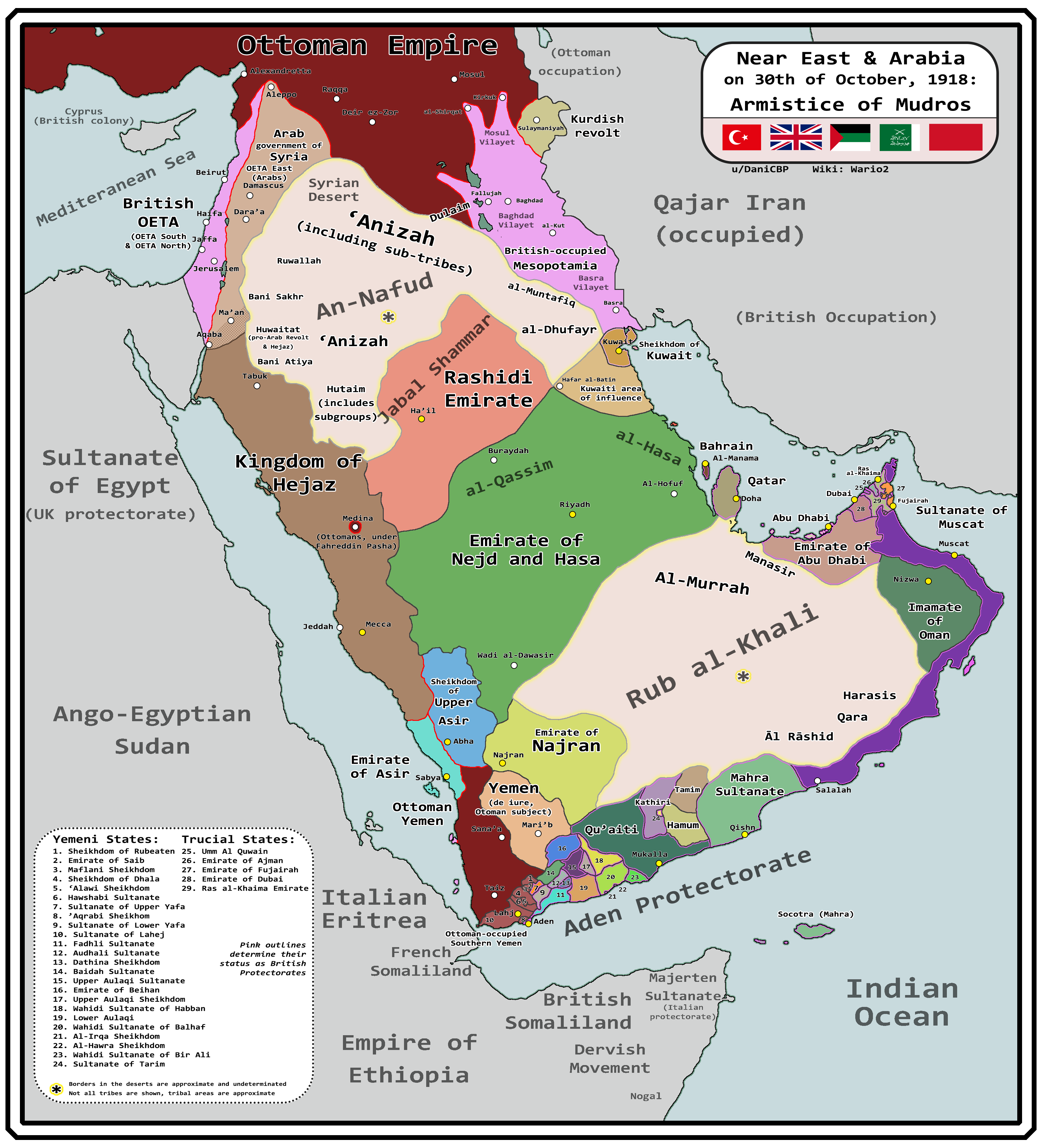
A map of the region at the end of the war

The United Kingdom agreed in the McMahon–Hussein Correspondence that it would support Arab independence if they revolted against the Ottomans.

However, the United Kingdom and France reneged on the original deal and divided up the area under the 1916 Sykes–Picot Agreement in ways that the Arabs felt were unfavourable to them. Further confusing the issue was the Balfour Declaration of 1917, which promised support for a Jewish "national home" in Palestine. This series of events is often characterised as a betrayal of the Arabs by the British. For a brief period, the Hejaz region of western Arabia became a self-declared state, without being universally recognised as such, under Hussein's control. Although both Ibn Saud and Hussein received British aid, it was eventually conquered by Ibn Saud in 1925, as part of his military and sociopolitical campaign for the unification of Saudi Arabia.

The Arab Revolt is seen by historians as the first organized movement of Arab nationalism. It brought together different Arab groups for the first time with the common goal to fight for independence from the Ottoman Empire. Much of the history of Arab independence stemmed from the revolt beginning with the kingdom that had been founded by Hussein.

After the war, the Arab Revolt had implications. Groups of people were put into classes that were based on whether they had fought in the revolt and their rank. In Iraq, a group of Sharifian officers from the Arab Revolt formed a political party that they headed. The Hashemites in Jordan remain influenced by the actions of the revolt's Arab leaders.

== Underlying causes ==
=== Sharif Hussein of Mecca ===
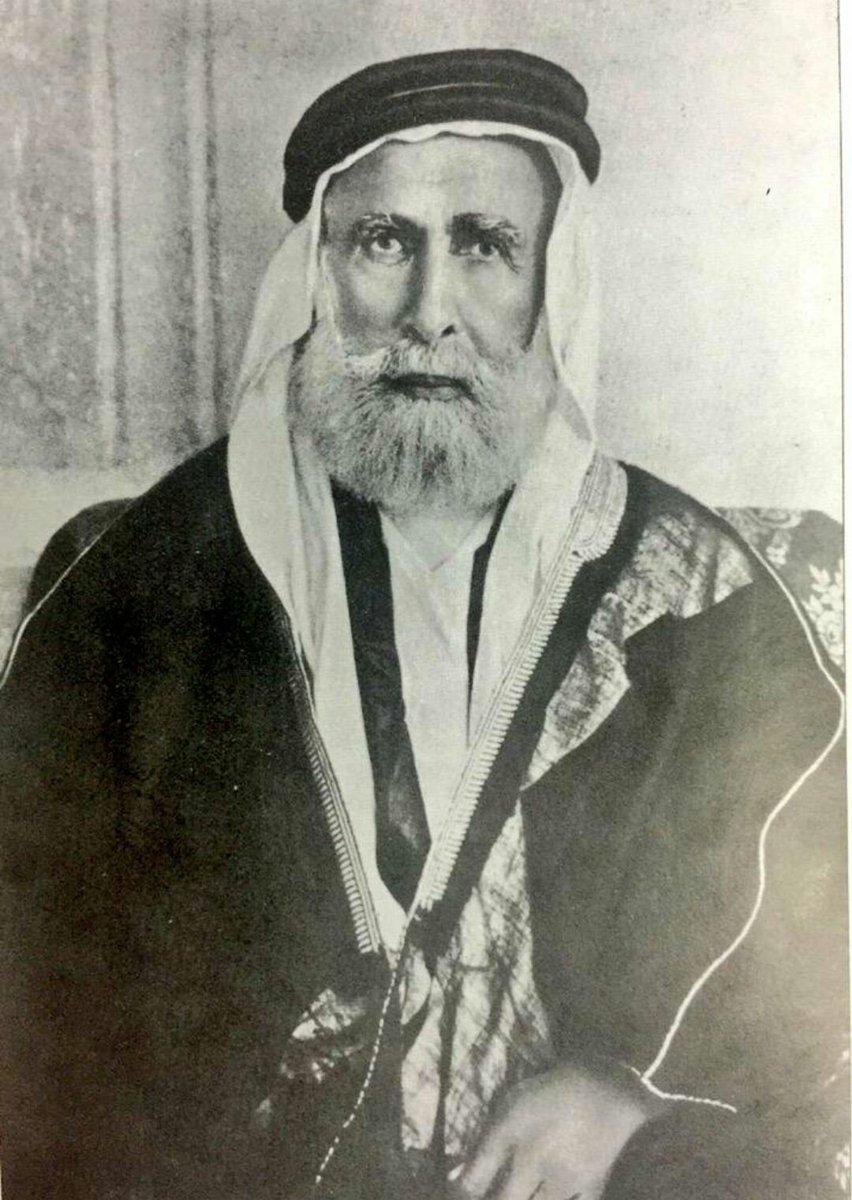
Hussein bin Ali, the Sharif and Emir of Mecca from 1908 to 1924 and King of the Hejaz from 1916 to 1924.

Hussein bin Ali, the Sharif and Emir of Mecca from 1908, enthroned himself as King of the Hejaz after proclaiming the Great Arab Revolt against the Ottoman Empire, and continued to hold both of the offices of Sharif and King from 1916 to 1924. At the end of his reign he also briefly laid claim to the office of Sharifian Caliph. He was a 37th-generation direct descendant of Muhammad, as he belongs to the Hashemite family.

A member of the Dhawu Awn clan (Banu Hashim) from the Qatadid emirs of Mecca, he was perceived to have rebellious inclinations and in 1893 was summoned to Istanbul, where he was kept on the Council of State. In 1908, in the aftermath of the Young Turk Revolution, he was appointed Emir of Mecca by the Ottoman sultan Abdul Hamid II.

In 1916, with the promise of British support for Arab independence, he proclaimed the Great Arab Revolt against the Ottoman Empire, accusing the Committee of Union and Progress (CUP) of violating tenets of Islam and limiting the power of the sultan-caliph. Shortly after the outbreak of the revolt, Hussein declared himself "King of the Arab Countries". However, his pan-Arab aspirations were not accepted by the Allies, who recognized him only as King of the Hejaz.

In the aftermath of World War I, Hussein refused to ratify the Treaty of Versailles, in protest at the Balfour Declaration and the establishment of British and French mandates in Syria, Iraq, and Palestine. He later refused to sign the Anglo-Hashemite Treaty and thus deprived himself of British support when his kingdom was attacked by Ibn Saud. After the Kingdom of Hejaz was invaded by the Al Saud-Wahhabi armies of the Ikhwan, on 23 December 1925 King Hussein bin Ali surrendered to the Saudis, bringing both the Kingdom of Hejaz and the Sharifate of Mecca to an end.

According to Efraim Karsh of Bar-Ilan University, Sharif Hussein of Mecca was "a man with grandiose ambitions" who had first started to fall out with his masters in Istanbul when the dictatorship, a triumvirate known as the Three Pashas, General Enver Pasha, Talaat Pasha, and Cemal Pasha, which represented the radical Turkish nationalist wing of the Committee of Union and Progress (CUP), seized power in a coup d'état in January 1913 and began to pursue a policy of Turkification, which gradually angered non-Turkish subjects. Hussein started to embrace the language of Arab nationalism only after the Young Turk Revolution against the Ottoman sultan Abdul Hamid II in July 1908. The fighting force of the revolt was mostly combined from Ottoman defectors and Arabian tribes loyal to the Sharif.

=== Religious justification ===
Though the Sharifian revolt was described in retrospect as rooted in a secular Arab nationalist sentiment, the Sharif did not present it in those terms. Rather, he accused the Young Turks of violating the sacred tenets of Islam by pursuing the policy of Turkification and discriminating against its non-Turkish population, and called Arab Muslims to sacred rebellion against the Ottoman government. The Turks answered by accusing the rebelling tribes of betraying the Ottoman Caliphate during a campaign against imperialist powers attempting to divide and govern Muslim lands. The Turks said the revolting Arabs gained nothing after the revolt; rather, the Middle East was carved up by the British and French.

=== Ethnic tensions ===
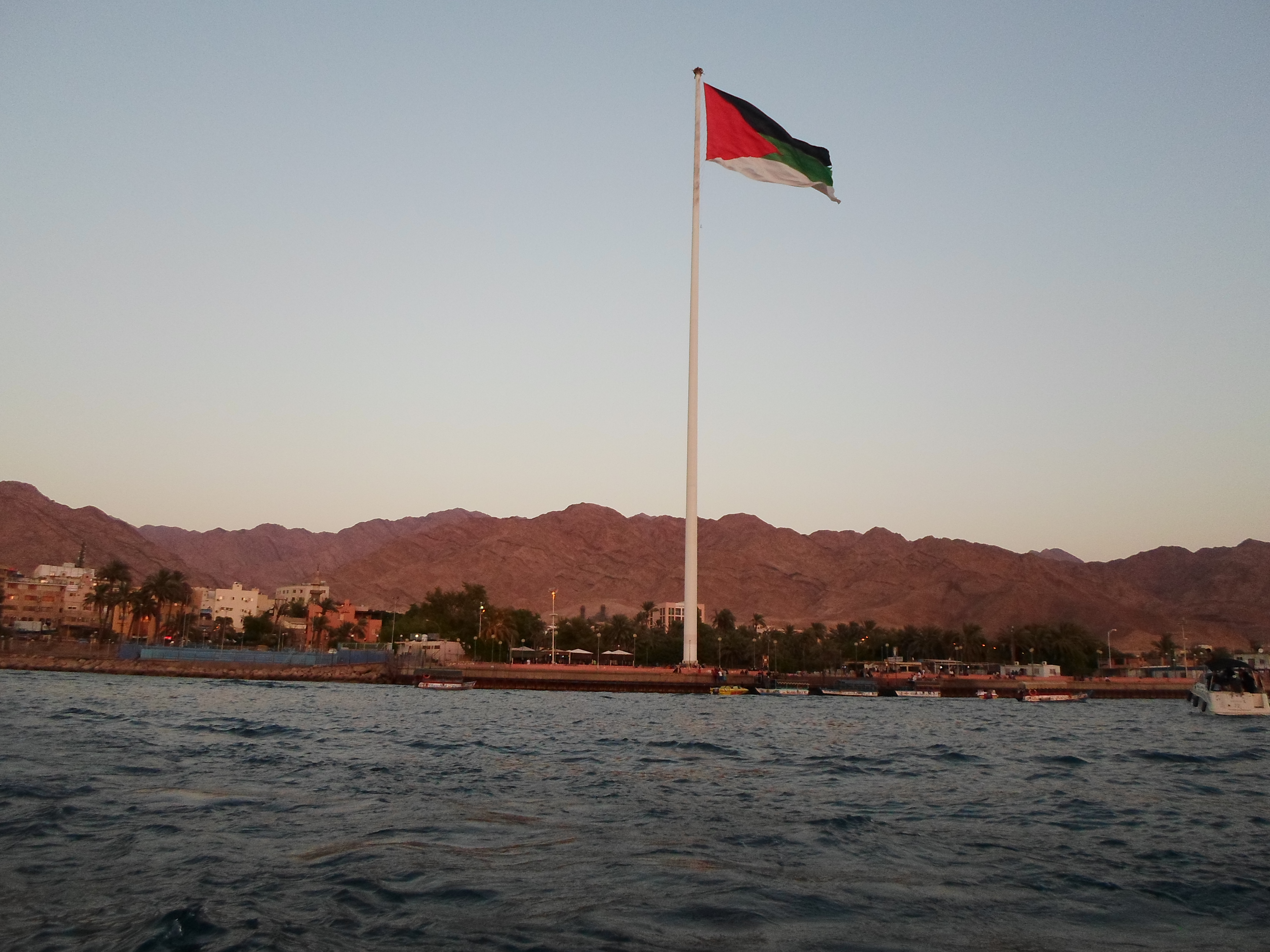
The Aqaba Flagpole holding the flag of the Arab Revolt, commemorating the site of the Battle of Aqaba.

This early Arab nationalism came about when the majority of the Arabs living in the Turkish Empire were loyal primarily to their own families, clans, and tribes despite efforts of the Turkish ruling class, who pursued a policy of Turkification through the Tanzimat reforms and hoped to create a feeling of "Ottomanism" among the different ethnicities under the Ottoman rule. Liberal reforms brought about by the Tanzimat also transformed the Ottoman Caliphate into a secular empire, which weakened the Islamic concept of Ummah that tied the different races together. The rise of the Committee of Union and Progress (CUP) to power and the creation of a one-party state in 1913 which mandated Turkish nationalism as a state ideology, worsened the relationship between the Ottoman state and its non-Turkish subjects.

In the United States, Arabs and Hebrews who immigrated from Ottoman Turkey petitioned the U.S. Department of State to not be classified as "Turkish", but as "Arab" or "Hebrew".

== See also ==
- Campaigns of the Arab Revolt
- Flag of the Arab Revolt
- History of Saudi Arabia
- South Arabia during World War I

== Sources ==
- Cleveland, William L. and Martin Bunton. (2016) A History of the Modern Middle East. 6th ed. Westview Press.
- Falls, Cyril (1930) Official History of the Great War Based on Official Documents by Direction of the Historical Section of the Committee of Imperial Defence; Military Operations Egypt & Palestine from June 1917 to the End of the War Vol. 2. London: H. M. Stationery Office
- Erickson, Edward. Ordered to Die: A History of the Ottoman Army in the First World War. Westport, CT: Greenwood. ISBN 978-0-313-31516-9.
- Khalidi, Rashid (1991). The Origins of Arab Nationalism. Columbia University Press. ISBN 978-0-231-07435-3.
- Murphy, David (2008) The Arab Revolt 1916–18 Lawrence sets Arabia Ablaze. Osprey: London. ISBN 978-1-84603-339-1.
- Parnell, Charles L. (August 1979) CDR USN "Lawrence of Arabia's Debt to Seapower" United States Naval Institute Proceedings.
