= Martyrs' Memorial (Amman) =

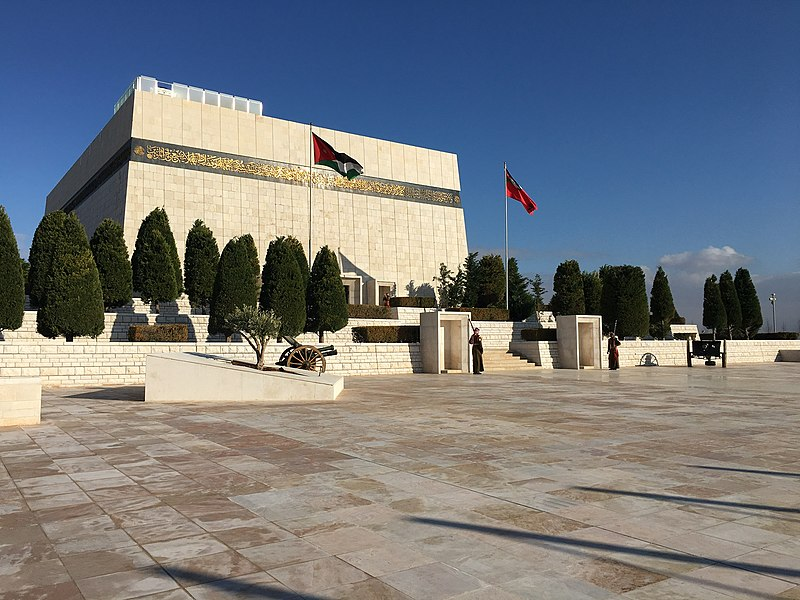
- Martyrs' Memorial entrance
- Established: 1977
- Location: Amman, Jordan
- Coordinates: 31°59′12″N 35°54′23″E
- Type: Memorial

The Martyrs' Memorial is a memorial and museum located next to the Amman Sport City in Amman, Jordan. It was established upon King Hussein's wishes and inaugurated by him on July 25, 1977. The museum showcases a rare collection of Jordan's military weapons, clothing and vehicles. It also serves as a memorial to the martyrs who sacrificed their lives in the service of Jordan as early as 1915, starting with the Great Arab Revolt, which was led by King Hussein's great-grandfather, Hussein bin Ali.

Approximately 70,000 people visit the museum every year, and entry is free for all visitors regardless of nationality.

== Building ==
The memorial was designed by an anonymous Jordanian architect, and the construction was carried out by the Royal Engineering Corps in collaboration with local companies.

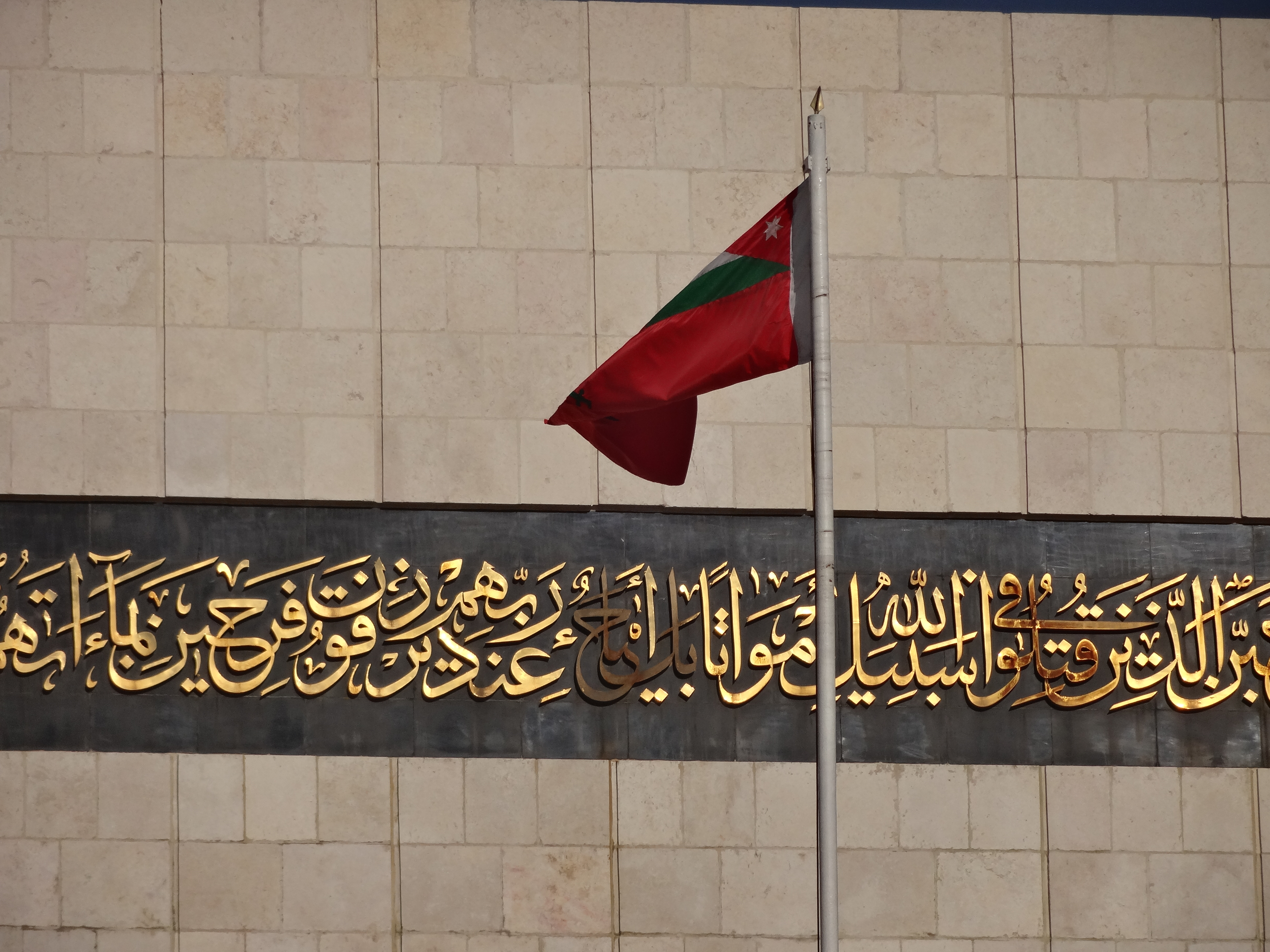
Gold-plated Quranic verses on the memorial's exterior

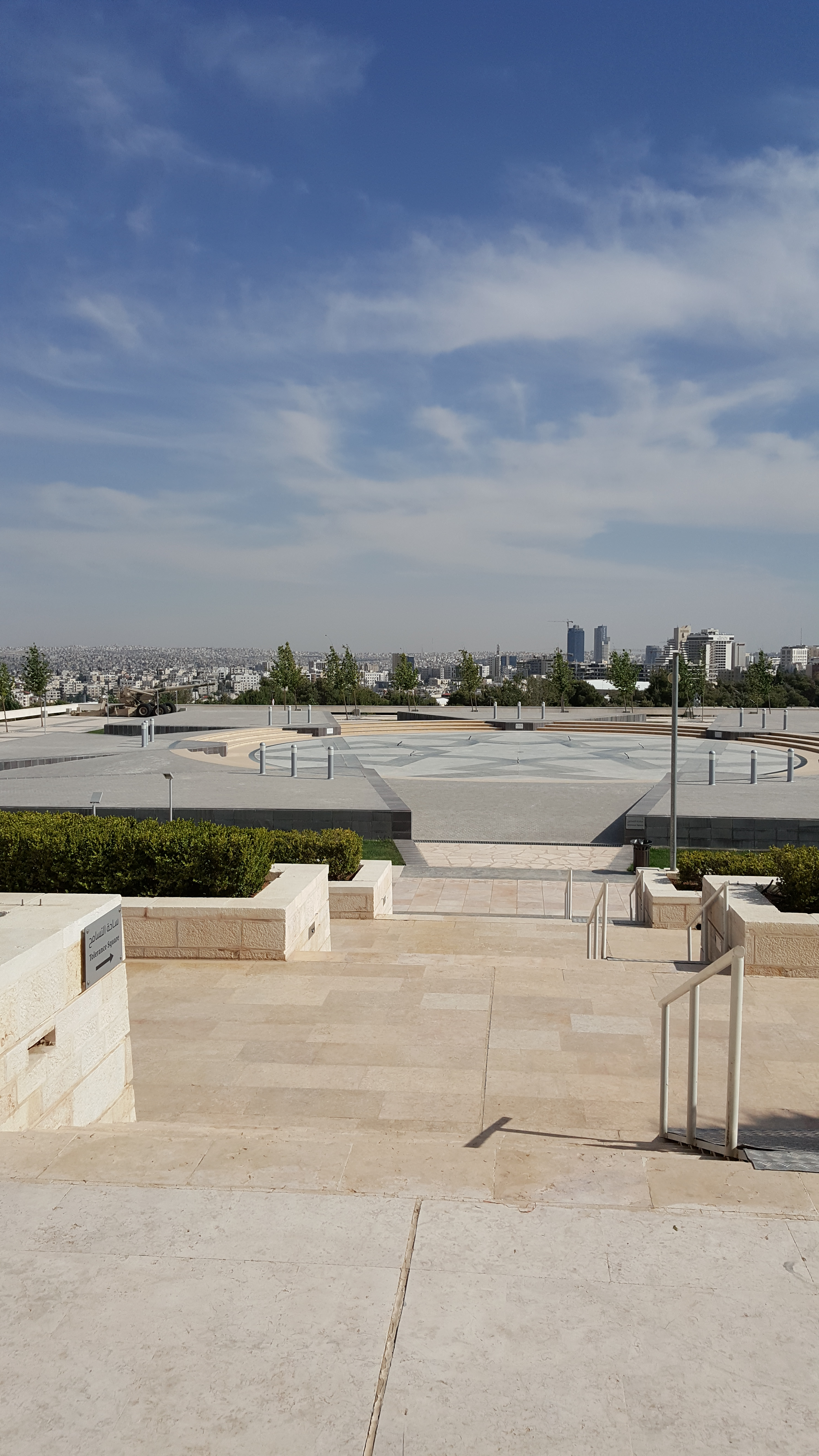
A distant view of Tolerance Square

The main building is shaped as a cuboid with gentle tapering. Its exterior is mainly made of white limestone. Near the top, a black basalt strip goes all around the building with gold-plated Quranic verses about martyrdom (Al Imran, Verse 169). This resembles the physical form of the Kaaba in Mecca, which demonstrates the ties between Jordanian views of martyrdom and Islamic values.

== Renovation ==
In 2014, the Museum underwent a two-year-long renovation mainly targeted towards the front and side courtyards, interior layout and journey sequencing, and the roof. The roof previously featured a grass lawn with (landscape features) and an olive tree at the center, known as ‘The Tree of Life’. As an annual tradition, the King watered this tree on June 10th in memory of the Great Arab Revolt. The renovation led to the removal of all vegetation on the roof (replaced with tiles), and replacing the tree of life with a seven pointed star-shaped skylight that sits directly above the tomb of the unknown martyr. The tree was moved to the front courtyard, in place of a tank that was previously parked there. Moreover, the side courtyards received new tiling (see more below). As for non-physical changes, the memorial received a logo revamp designed by ALAZAAT Studio and Syntax.

== Courtyards ==
=== Entrance and Main Courtyard (Memorial Square) ===
The entrance to the museum features a long ascending staircase leading to the front courtyard. This is said to symbolize the ascension of martyrs’ souls to heaven. The courtyard is an open, square, symmetric area primarily composed of white limestone; it serves as the lead to the main entrance. Additionally, the courtyard is decorated with military vehicles, artillery, and fighter planes used in wars that Jordan fought in 1948 (Arab-Israeli War), 1966 (Battle of Samu), and 1967 (Battle of Karameh). All vehicles have signs attached to them displaying information about name, manufacture, weaponry, and service period. A notable object on display is a Hawker Hunter warplane belonging to the Royal Jordanian Air Force that participated in the Battle of Samu in 1966. It was led, at the time, by Pilot Captain Ihsan Shardam and shot down two Israeli fighter planes.

=== Right Courtyard (Tolerance Square) ===
Tolerance Square is a large area located right of the museum’s entrance. It contains an elevated platform with tiles forming embedded 7-pointed-star designs originating from the center, resembling the 7-pointed-star in the Jordanian flag. Currently, the Jordanian flag sits at its center on a short pole. The tiling patterns encircling the center stem from Islamic geometric design principles; these were added with the renovation. The tiles are made from slate.

== Interior ==
=== First Level ===
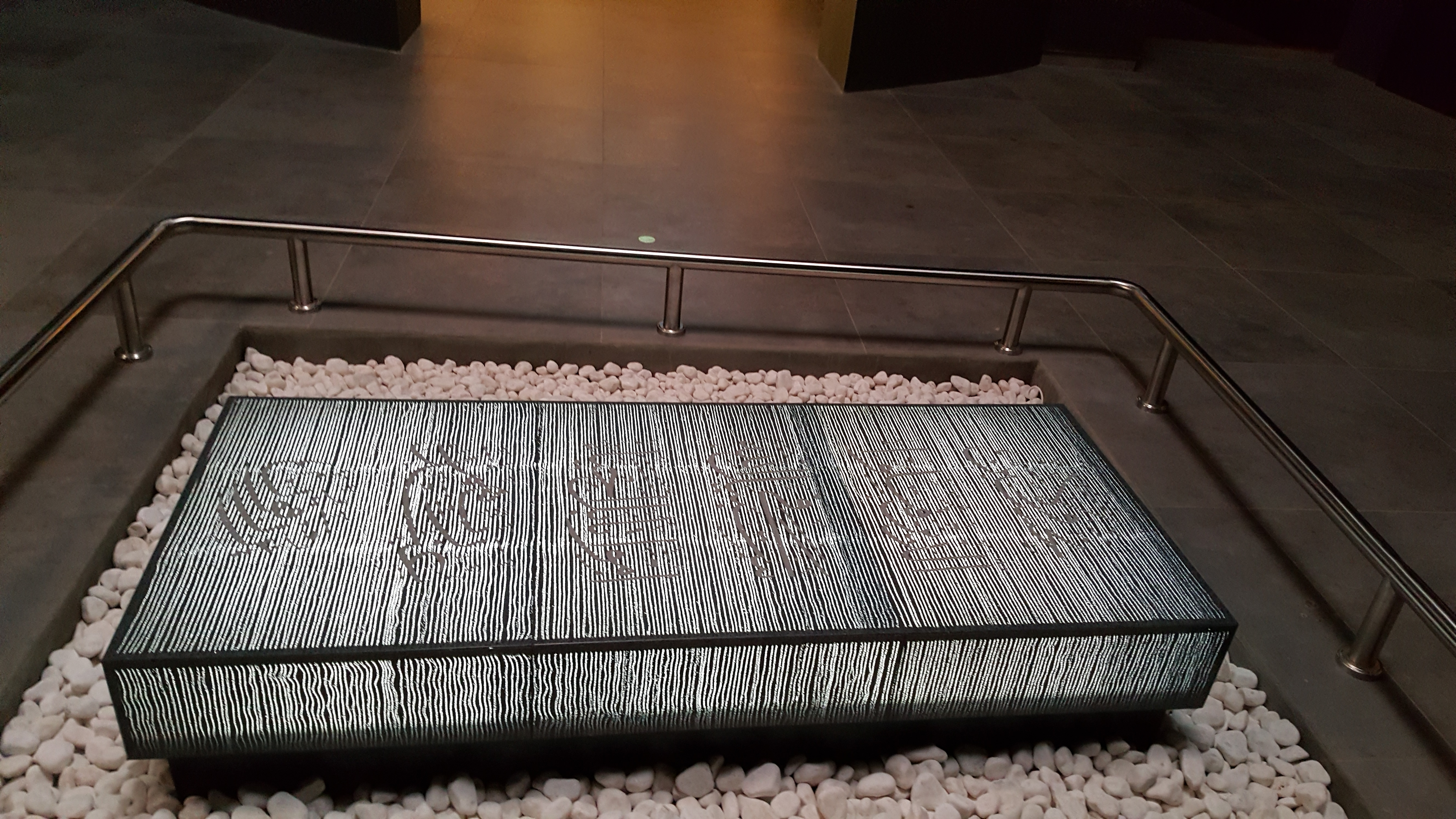
Tomb of the Unknown Martyr with illuminated LUCEM concrete

Upon entering the museum, visitors are greeted with a wall displaying 23 badges for each warfare branch of the Jordanian Armed Forces (JAF). The overall ambience is dim, with spaced overhead dispersive light, and a gray-based color palette. This is said to create a reflective space that respects the gravity of the martyrs’ sacrifices. The first floor is themed ‘Land of Sacrifice and Struggle’; it features ten glass tombs, each with illuminated tombstones that have a martyr trait written on them, as well as old pictures of soldiers and military uniform/memorabilia displays throughout. Just before the ramp leading to the second floor is reached, the entrance to the Tomb of the Unknown Soldier appears with a lofty archway decoration. The tomb holds the remains of an unidentified JAF soldier who died in the Jerusalem Battles. This section was added to the memorial during the 2016 renovation by Paradigm Design House. This area dramatizes the dim ambience with black walls, and displays an illuminated word map with pins highlighting places where Jordanian martyrs have died. Additionally, a seven-pointed star skylight rests right above the tomb, which sits at the center. When the sun is not directly overhead, the tomb is luminescent. This is achieved using a translucent concrete design by LUCEM. On the contrary, when the sun is overhead, the concrete shows its natural colors and engravings of verse 169 from Surat Al Imran become more visible.

=== Second Level ===
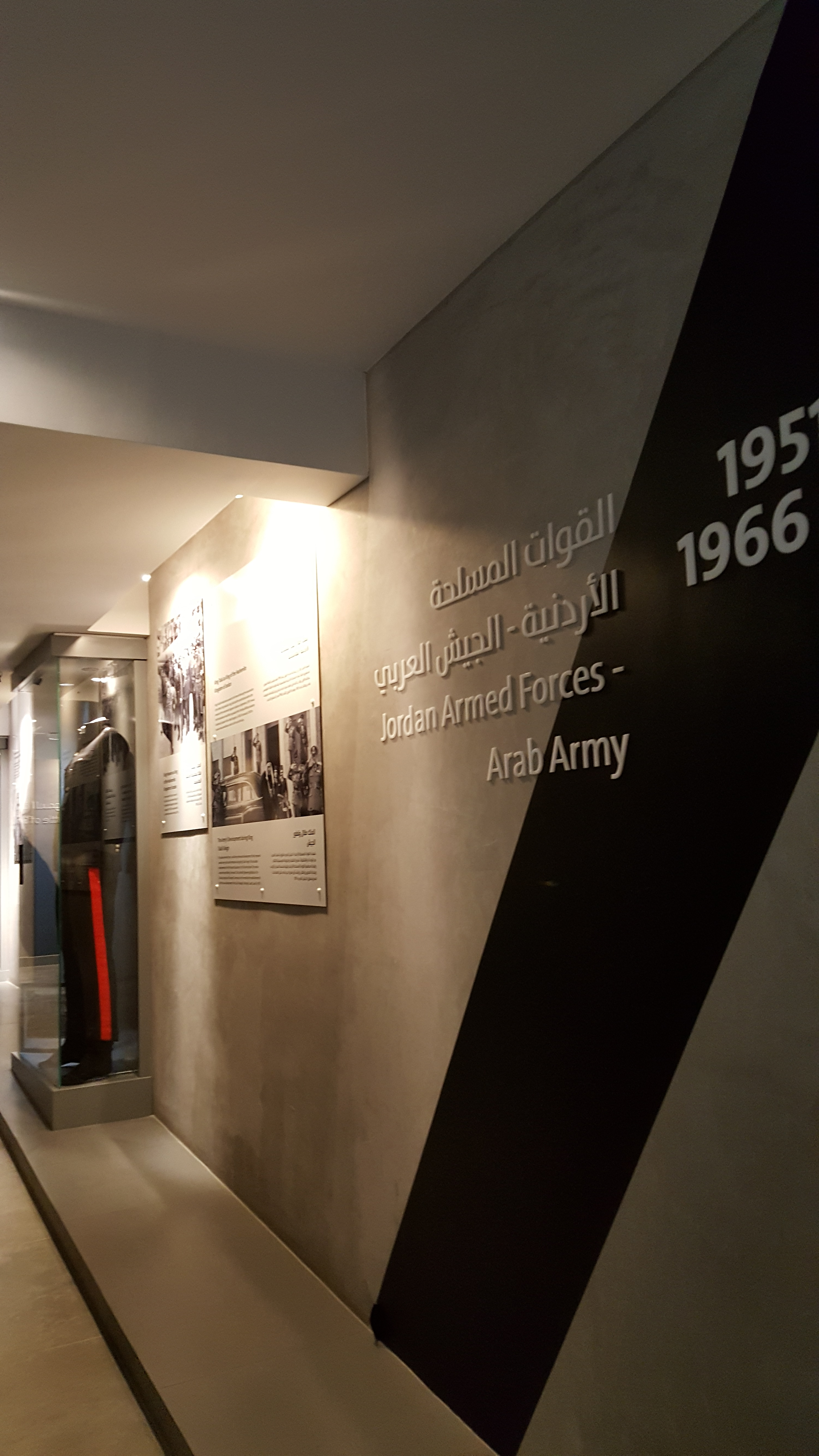
Section on the second level covering Jordan Armed Forces - Arab Army (1951-1966)

The second level is themed ‘Story of a Nation, Story of Humanity’ and is accessed by a shallow ramp. This is where the historical narratives of several pivotal points in Jordanian military history are displayed; these include:

- The Great Arab Revolt (1916)
- The Establishment of The Emirate of Transjordan (1921 - 1945)
- The Independence of the Hashemite Kingdom of Jordan (1946)
- The first Arab Israeli War (1948)
- Jordan Armed Forces - Arab Army (1951 - 1966)
- Battle of Samu (1966)
- The Six-Day War (1967)
- The Battle of Karamah (1968)
- October War - The Golan Heights (1973)
- Jordan Peace Ambassadors (1989)
- Milestones in the Development of the Jordan Armed Forces - Arab Army (1999 - 2016)

These stages are presented along continually ascending ramps that coil around the building’s central axis, linking chronology progression with height increase and maintaining the idea of ascending to heaven. Near the upper portion of the second level (where the ascension reaches its end), the ambience of the museum shifts with brighter light (including sunlight) and lighter hues of gray on the walls. This segment features personal belongings of martyrs, such as diaries, as well as displays of old newspapers that show the inauguration of the Martyr’s Memorial by King Hussein.

The final stop inside the memorial is ‘The Kings’ Hall’ - an area dedicated for displaying the Jordanian Kings’ royal military uniforms, possessions, decorative items, and the King Abdullah II Royal Chamber. Towards the end of this hall, an open roof is present with the star skylight as well as plates distributed around the walls containing names of all Jordanian martyrs; this area is called Martyr’s Square.
