= Iraqi Royal Cemetery =

Historic site in Baghdad, Iraq

Coordinates: 33°21′57″N 44°21′29″E

Royal Cemetery
- المقبرة الملكية
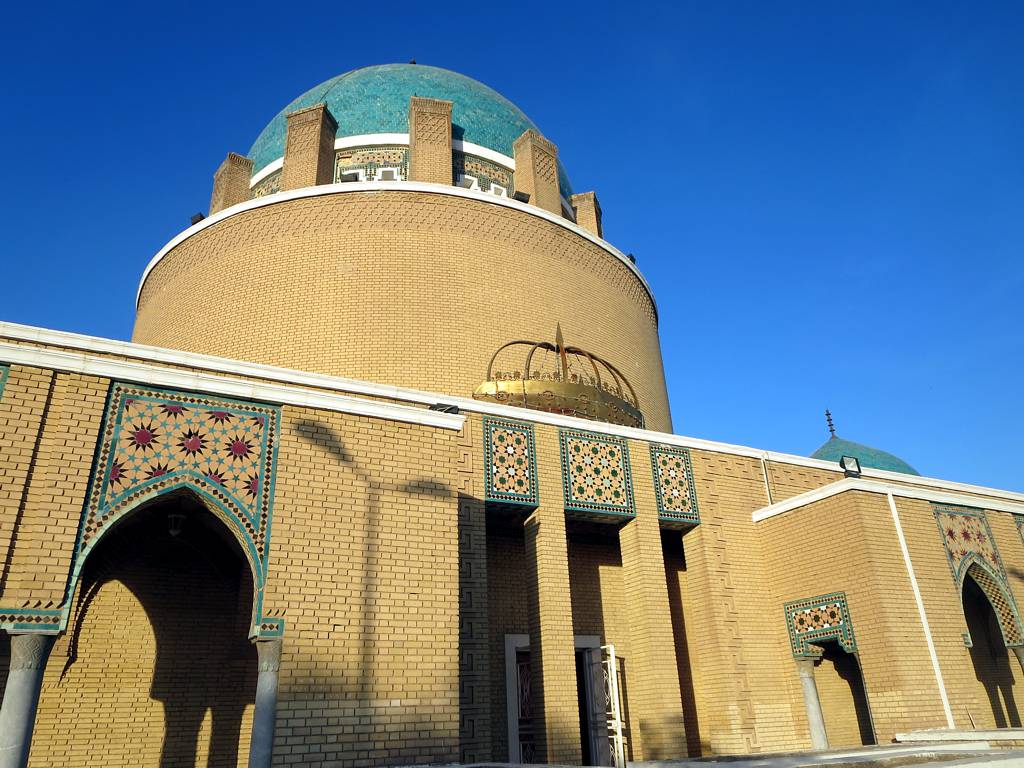
- Interactive map of the Royal Cemetery area

General information
- Location: Baghdad, Iraq
- Year built: 1934-1936
- Renovated: 2021

Design and construction
- Architect: John Brian Cooper

The Royal Cemetery in Baghdad, Iraq, is the site of the royal mausoleum where the Iraqi Royal Family is buried. Also known as the Royal Mausoleum, it was designed by the British architect John Brian Cooper and was built between 1934 and 1936 in the style of Islamic architecture.

== Description ==
The royal cemetery is a building located in the Adhamiyah district between the Iraqi University building and the Safina area. It is surrounded by streets on all sides. It was built in the style of Islamic architecture and has three blue domes covered painted in blue livery, decorated with Islamic motifs, and distinctive architecture. The royal cemetery was built of boulder rock called "beach stone", and it was covered with bricks. The doors and windows are made of teak wood.

On March 27, 2021, the Cemetery was restored and reopened to the public, and its historical importance was recognized. This coincided with the announcement that King Abdullah II of Jordan, a relative of the royal family, and Egyptian President Abdel Fattah el-Sisi would visit the cemetery.

== Burials ==
- Faisal I of Iraq (1888-1933)
- Ghazi of Iraq (1912-1939)
- Faisal II of Iraq (1935-1958)
- Regent Abd al-Ilah (1913-1958)
- Ali of Hejaz (1879–1935)
- Queen Huzaima (1884-1933)
- Queen Aliya (1911-1950)
- Ja'far al-Askari (1885-1936)
- Rustam Haidar (1889-1940)
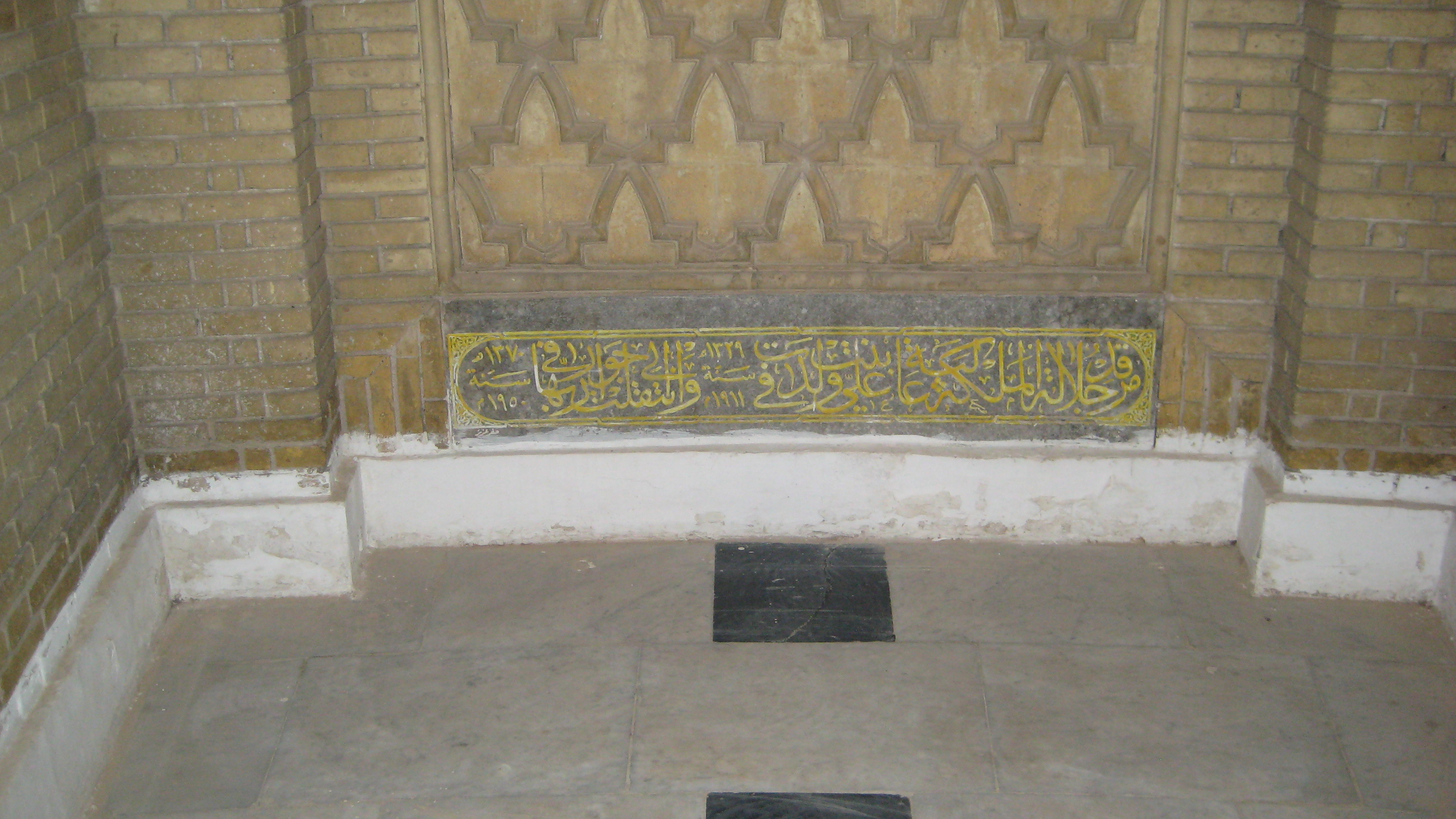
Tomb of Queen Aliya

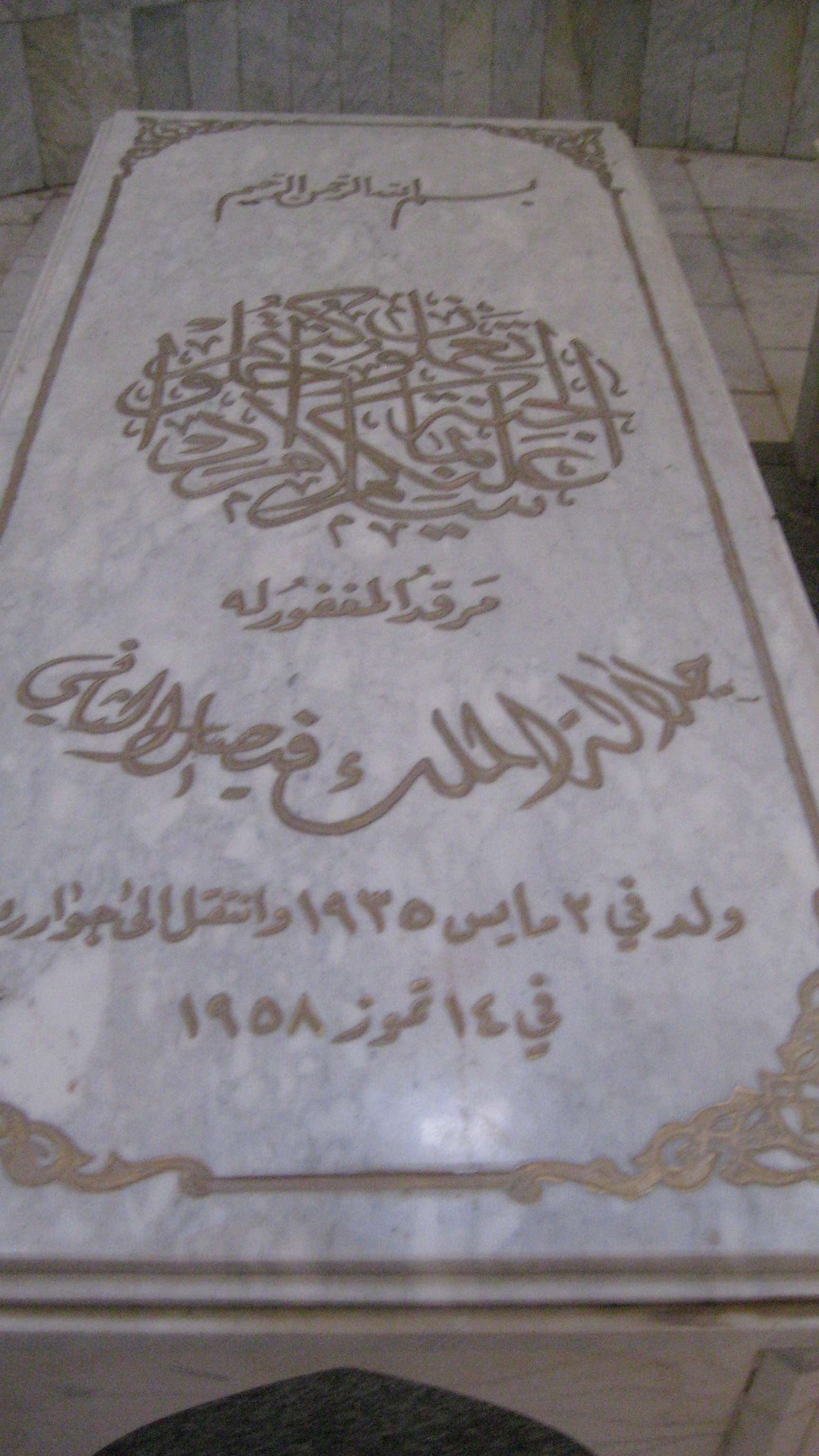
Tomb of King Faisal II of Iraq

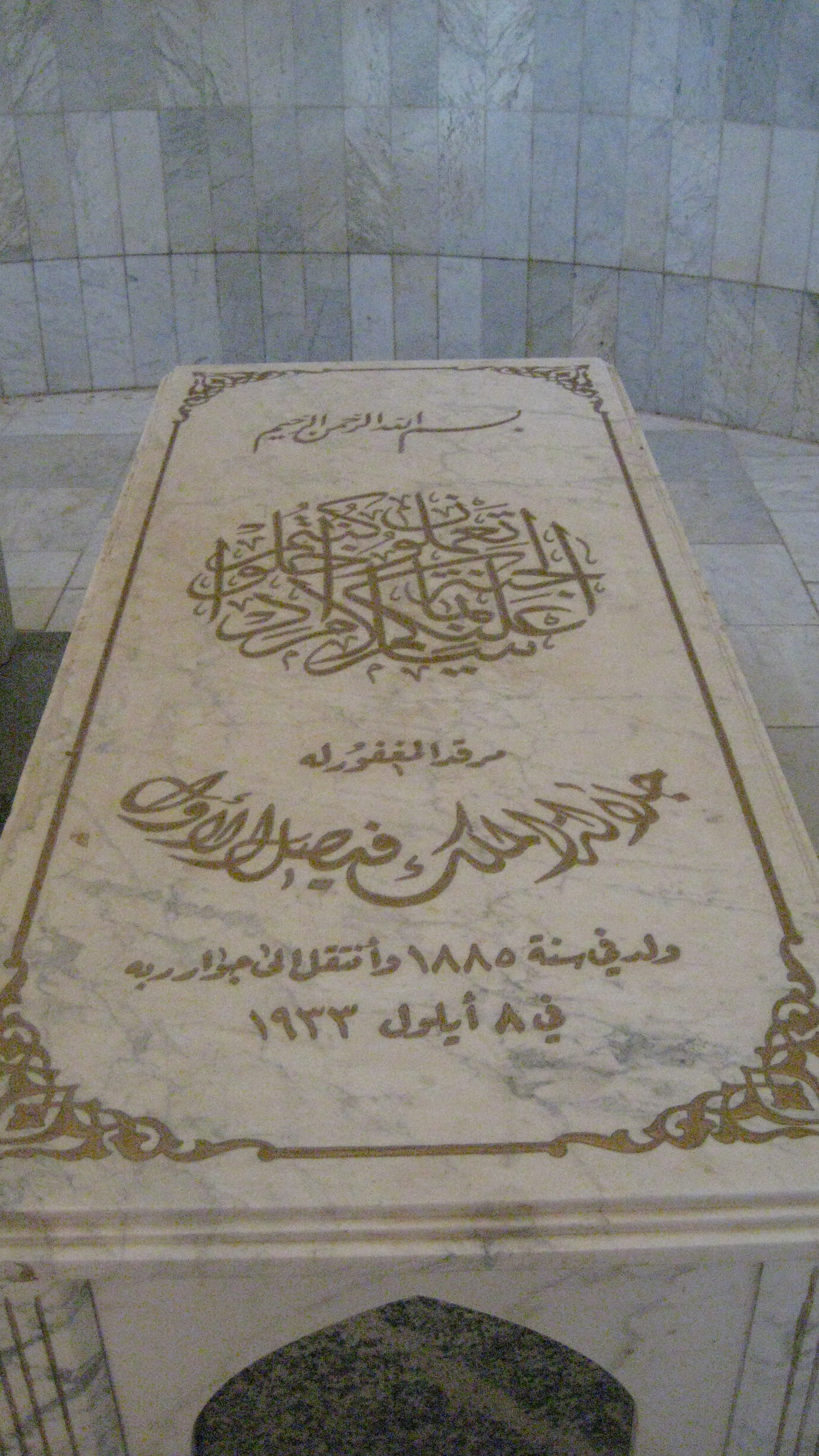
Tomb of King Faisal I of Iraq

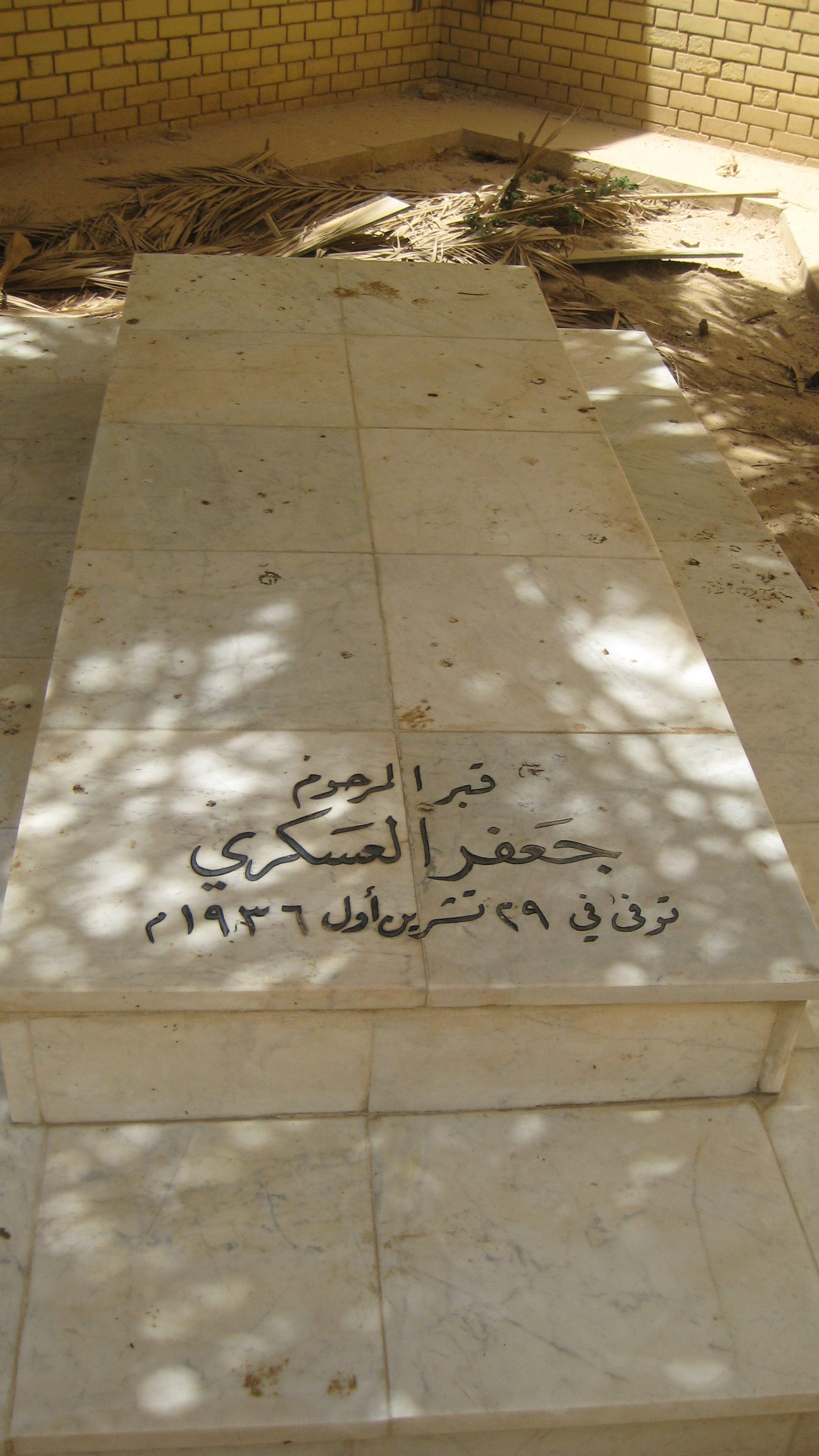
Grave of Ja'far al-Askari

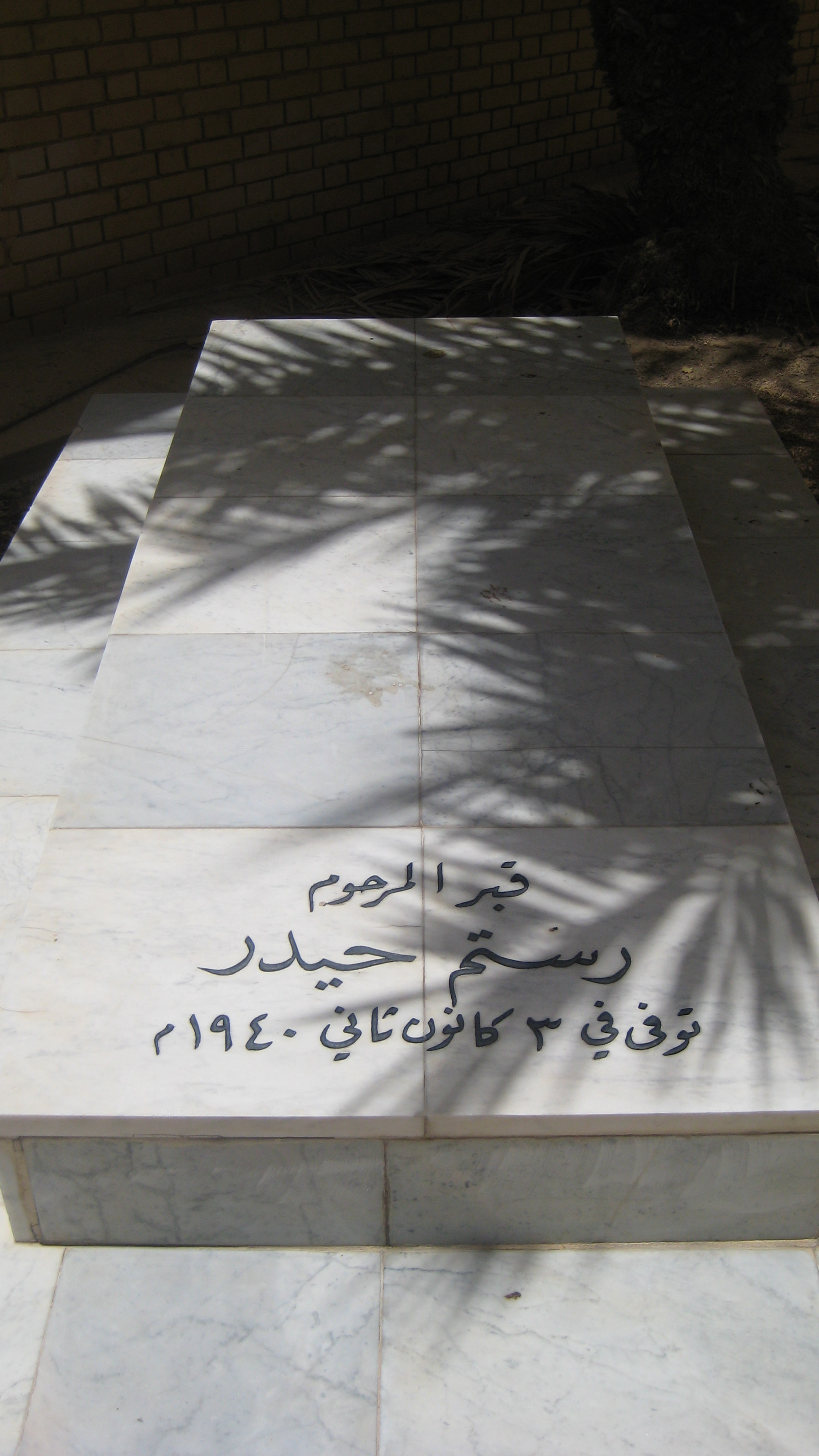
Grave of Rustam Haidar
