= Édouard Brémond =

French soldier (1868–1948)

- Born: 5 November 1868; Paris, France
- Died: 22 November 1948 (aged 80); Paris, France
- Military career
- Allegiance: France
- Branch: French Army
- Service years: 1888–1928
- Rank: Brigadier general
- Conflicts: Franco-Hova Wars; French conquest of Morocco; World War I; Arab Revolt
- Awards: Legion of Honour

Édouard Brémond (5 November 1868, in Paris – 22 November 1948, in Paris) was a French Army general and colonel for the French Third Republic, who served as commanding officer of the French Colonies to the Hejaz from 1914 to 1916, and as chief administrator of Cilicia from 1919 to 1920. He is best remembered as a contemporary of T. E. Lawrence in Arabia, and for his war memoirs La Cilicie en 1919-1920 (1921), and Le Hedjaz dans la guerre mondiale (1931).

== Career ==
A graduate of the École spéciale militaire de Saint-Cyr in 1890, Brémond was first posted as a second lieutenant at the 1st Regiment of Algerian tirailleur in southern Algeria from 1895, then at the 1st detachment in Antananarivo, Madagascar, where he took part in the Franco-Hova Wars. Afterwards, he studied at the École supérieure de guerre in 1899–1901, to be assigned to the staff of the Constantine division in 1901–1904, where he also had to perform tasks in the Aurès. In 1904–1907, he became an Officer of the 2nd regiment of tirailleurs, in which he had to create a post in Sidi Bou Djenane. In 1907–1908, he was responsible for the Moroccan ports police, then a deputy head of the French military mission in Morocco in 1909, administrator of the city of Rabat and its suburbs in 1912–1913, head of the intelligence service of the Henrys column in March–September 1913 to the Beni Mtir tribe, and finally commander of arms in Kenitra in 1913–1914.

In August 1914, Brémond returned to France in order to command the 64th Infantry Regiment, in which he fought on the French front from two years, where he was wounded. Later on, he was appointed head of the French military mission in Egypt and Hejaz from August 1916 to December 1917. During the events of the Arab Revolt, France intended to assert its influence in the region. Hence, the French authorities relied on the veteran officer of African campaigns, Brémond, who arrived at Alexandria on 1 September 1916, then Jeddah on the 20th of that month. He later had the mission of advising the Bedouin forces in sabotaging of the Hejaz railway. In the meantime, his English rival T. E. Lawrence tried to undermine his influence in the war. Brémond then became the Chief Administrator in Cilicia in the Occupied Enemy Territory Administration between 1 January 1919 and September 1920.

Following the Battle of Marash, Brémond reflected on the decision of French withdrawal:

The decision for the retreat remains a mystery. It was not made in Beirut, nor in Adana, but at Marash. There seems to be no doubt that the order to leave would not have been given if a wireless outfit had been available in Marash permitting unbroken communication with Adana.

—

Later on, he commanded the 54th Infantry Regiment in Compiègne. He ended his military career as a brigadier general, commanding the 2nd group of subdivisions of the 17th region in Toulouse in 1923–1928. He eventually died in Paris on 22 November 1948, aged 80.

== Awards ==
- Grand Officer of the Legion of Honour

== Sources ==
- Anderson, Scott (2014). Lawrence in Arabia: War, Deceit, Imperial Folly and the Making of the Modern Middle East. Atlantic Books. ISBN 978-1-78239-201-9.
- Fromkin, David (2010). A Peace to End All Peace: The Fall of the Ottoman Empire and the Creation of the Modern Middle East. Henry Holt and Company. ISBN 9781429988520.
- Kerr, Stanley (1973). The Lions of Marash: Personal Experiences with American Near East Relief, 1919-1922. State University of New York Press. ISBN 978-1-4384-0882-8.
- Larive, M.; Ardei, P.; Sibille, C. (2003). Fonds Edouard Brémond (1868-1948) (in French). Archives nationales (France) – Pierrefitte-sur-Seine.
