= Shura Island =

Island in Saudi Arabia

Native name: جزيرة شورى
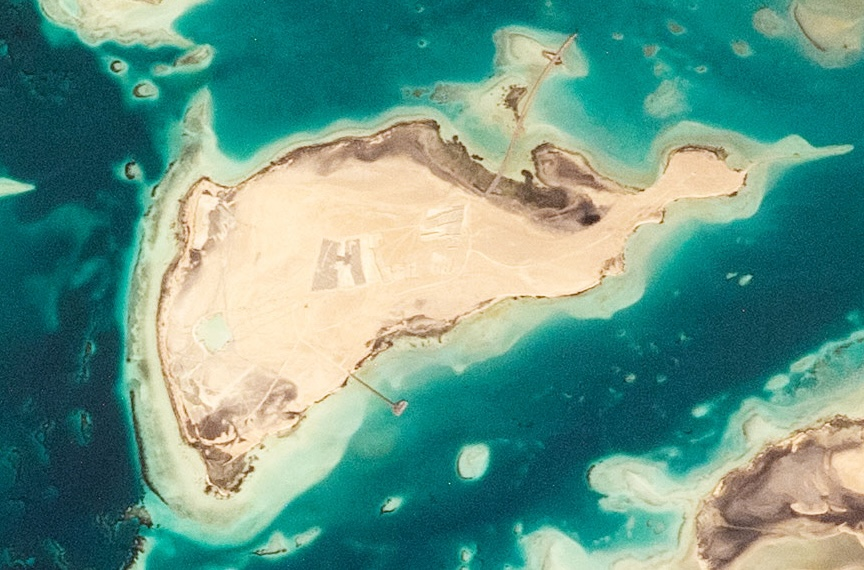
- NASA photograph of Shura

- Location within Saudi Arabia

Geography
- Location: Red Sea
- Coordinates: 25°30′15″N 36°57′27″E
- Area: 5.6 km^{2} (2.2 sq mi)

Administration
- Saudi Arabia
- Province: Tabuk

Demographics
- Population: Uninhabited

Additional information
- Time zone: Arabian Standard Time (UTC+3)

Shura Island, also known as Shurayrah, is a resort island in the Red Sea coast of Tabuk Province, Saudi Arabia. Shura is the main island of The Red Sea Destination, a tourism megaproject that is being constructed on a 92-island archipelago off the Red Sea coast.

== Location ==
The 5.6 km^{2} island is located on the west coast of Saudi Arabia between the cities of Umluj and Al-Wajh, 0.9 nautical miles off the coast. The island is one of 92 islands that lie within an archipelago in Al Wajh lagoon, a pristine 2,081 km^{2} area that includes valuable habitats (coral reefs, seagrass, and mangroves) and species of global conservation importance.

The island's natural shape has been described as resembling the outline of a dolphin.

== Background ==
Shura is home to "Coral Bloom", The Red Sea Project's most ambitious construction design. Coral bloom includes hotels from 11 different brands. Coral Bloom was designed by the London-based architecture firm Foster and Partners.

In addition, the island includes Saudi Arabia's first 18-hole golf course and clubhouse. The 7,500 yard course was designed by Brian Curley, with the clubhouse designed by Foster + Partners and is expected to open in 2025.

Shura is linked to the mainland by Saudi Arabia's longest water bridge, which stretches a total of 1.2 km. The bridge was designed and constructed by Athens-based construction firm Archirodon.

== History ==
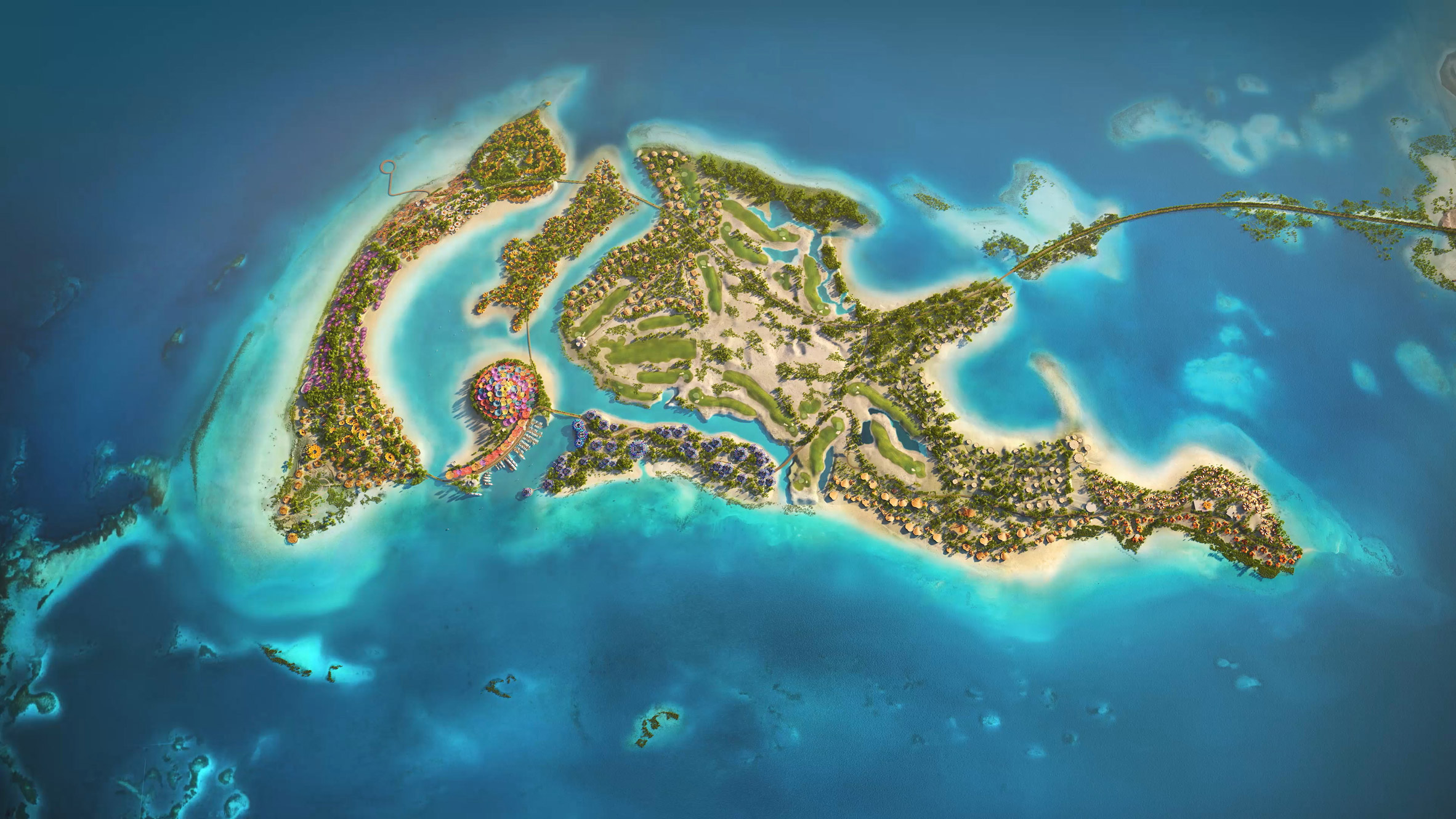
Concept image of Coral Bloom project in The Red Sea Project

Shura island remained uninhabited and undeveloped for most of its history until a plan to develop the red sea coast of the Saudi Arabia was announced in July 2017 by Crown Prince Mohammed bin Salman as part of Saudi Vision 2030 to develop the kingdom's tourism sector. The island is developed by Red Sea Global, previously "The Red Sea Development Company", which is one of the various companies owned by the Public Investment Fund.

== List of hotels ==
Shura is home to different hotels from various brands. The following is a list of all 11 hotels on Shura Island:

Hotel	Manager	Capacity	Ref
Grand Hyatt The Red Sea	Hyatt	430 keys	
Four Seasons Resort Red Sea at Shura Island	Four Seasons Hotels and Resorts	149 keys	
Faena The Red Sea	Faena (Accor)	150 keys	
Fairmont Red Sea	Fairmont Hotels and Resorts (Accor)	200 keys	
The Red Sea Edition	Edition Hotels (Marriott International)	240 keys	
InterContinental The Red Sea	InterContinental (IHG Hotels & Resorts)	210 keys	
Raffles The Red Sea	Raffles Hotels & Resorts (Accor)	200 keys	
Jumeirah The Red Sea	Jumeirah (hotel chain)	159 keys	
Rosewood The Red Sea	Rosewood Hotel Group	200 keys	
Miraval The Red Sea	Miraval Resorts (Hyatt)	180 keys	
SLS The Red Sea	SLS Hotels (Accor)	153 keys	

== See also ==
- List of islands of Saudi Arabia
- Sheybarah Island
- Saudi Red Sea Authority
- Amaala
- List of Saudi Vision 2030 projects
