= Sheybarah Island =

Island in Saudi Arabia

Native name: جزيرة شيبارة
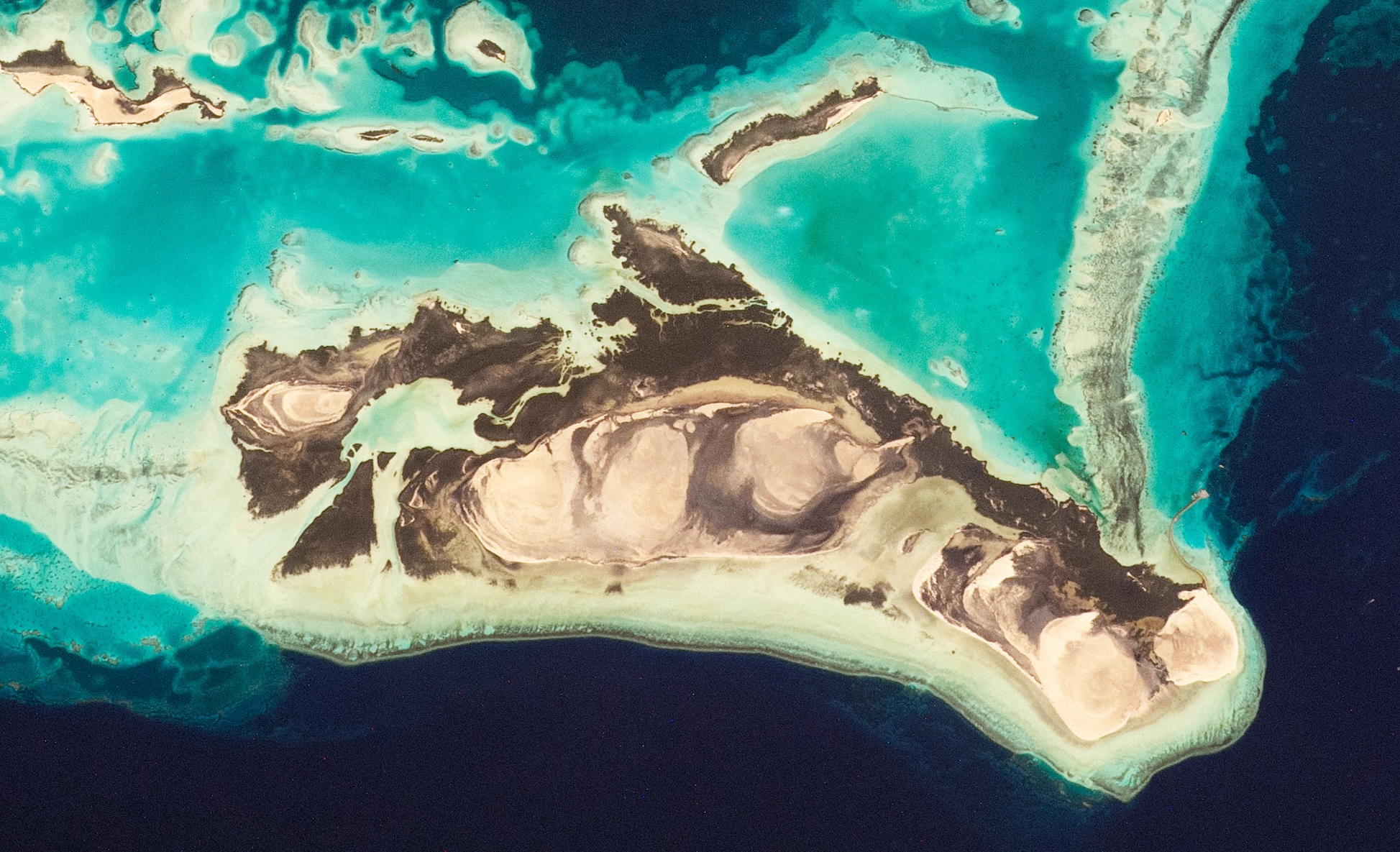
- NASA photograph of Sheybarah

- Location within Saudi Arabia

Geography
- Location: Red Sea
- Coordinates: 25°21′56″N 36°53′42″E
- Area: 19.8 km^{2} (7.6 sq mi)

Administration
- Saudi Arabia
- Province: Tabuk

Demographics
- Population: Uninhabited

Additional information
- Time zone: Arabian Standard Time (UTC+3)

Sheybarah Island, also known as Shebara, is a resort island in the Red Sea coast of Tabuk Province, Saudi Arabia. Sheybarah is part of a 92-island archipelago that is being developed for tourism as part of The Red Sea Project and is home to Shebara resort, a 73-key resort which was opened to tourists in November 2024.

== Location ==
The 19.8 km^{2} island is located on the west coast of Saudi Arabia between the cities of Umluj and Al-Wajh. The island is one of 92 islands that lie within an archipelago in Al Wajh lagoon, a pristine 2,081 km^{2} area that includes valuable habitats (coral reefs, seagrass, and mangroves) and species of global conservation importance.

== History ==
Sheybarah island remained uninhabited and undeveloped for most of its history until a plan to develop the red sea coast of the Saudi Arabia was announced in July 2017 by Crown Prince Mohammed bin Salman as part of Saudi Vision 2030 to develop the kingdom's tourism sector.

The island is developed by Red Sea Global, previously "The Red Sea Development Company", which is one of the companies owned by the Public Investment Fund.

In November 2024, Sheybarah island was officially opened for tourists with the opening of the Shebara resort. The resort features 73 oval-shaped reflective steel villa, 38 of which are overwater villas. The resort was designed by Killa Design, and was featured in TIME Magazine's "World's Greatest Places" of 2025.

== See also ==
- List of islands of Saudi Arabia
- Shura Island
- Amaala
- Saudi Red Sea Authority
- List of Saudi Vision 2030 projects
