= The Protection of Underwater Cultural Heritage Center in Saudi Arabia =

The Protection of Underwater Cultural Heritage Center
- Founded: 2020
- Location: Saudi Arabia

The Protection of Underwater Cultural Heritage Center in Saudi Arabia is a center affiliated with the Heritage Commission, a key entity operating under the Saudi Ministry of Culture. Established in November 2020, the center's executive strategy was launched in August 2022, with the aim of preserving and discovering underwater cultural heritage. It operates in collaboration with several local and global universities, including King Abdullah University of Science and Technology (KAUST) and its Red Sea Research Center, King Abdulaziz University in Jeddah and the University of Naples “L’Orientale.”

== Discovered Sites ==
The Heritage Commission undertook its underwater survey of the area between Ras Al-Sheikh Hamid and the Umluj shipwreck from 13 July to 5 September 2022, which led to the discovery of 25 archaeological sites spanning the northeastern Saudi city of Tabuk, namely Ras Al-Sheikh Hamid at the tip of the Gulf of Aqaba, Duba Governorate, Al-Wajh Governorate and Umluj Governorate.

== Discovery of Umluj Shipwreck ==
The Umluj shipwreck area was previously surveyed in a collaborative effort by the Heritage Commission and an Italian team from the University of Naples “L’Orientale” in 2015 and 2016, which determined that the wreck dates back over 100 years. During the latest survey, the vessel's visible remains were cleaned. A mound of pottery, hundreds of high-quality Chinese porcelain pieces and various metals were unearthed around the wreck site, which was a part of the ship's cargo.
