= SRSA =

SRSA may refer to:

- Rescue Services Agency (Sweden)
- Saudi Red Sea Authority
- Sport and Recreation South Africa, a former government department
- State Records of South Australia, a state government department in Australia
