= Ghurayyah mine =

Tantalum mine in Saudi Arabia

- Location: Tabuk Province, Saudi Arabia
- Products: Tantalum

The Ghurayyah mine is a large mine located in the western part of Saudi Arabia in Tabuk Province. Ghurayyah represents one of the largest tantalum reserves in Saudi Arabia having estimated reserves of 385 million tonnes of ore grading 0.025% tantalum.
