= Resort island =

Hotel complex

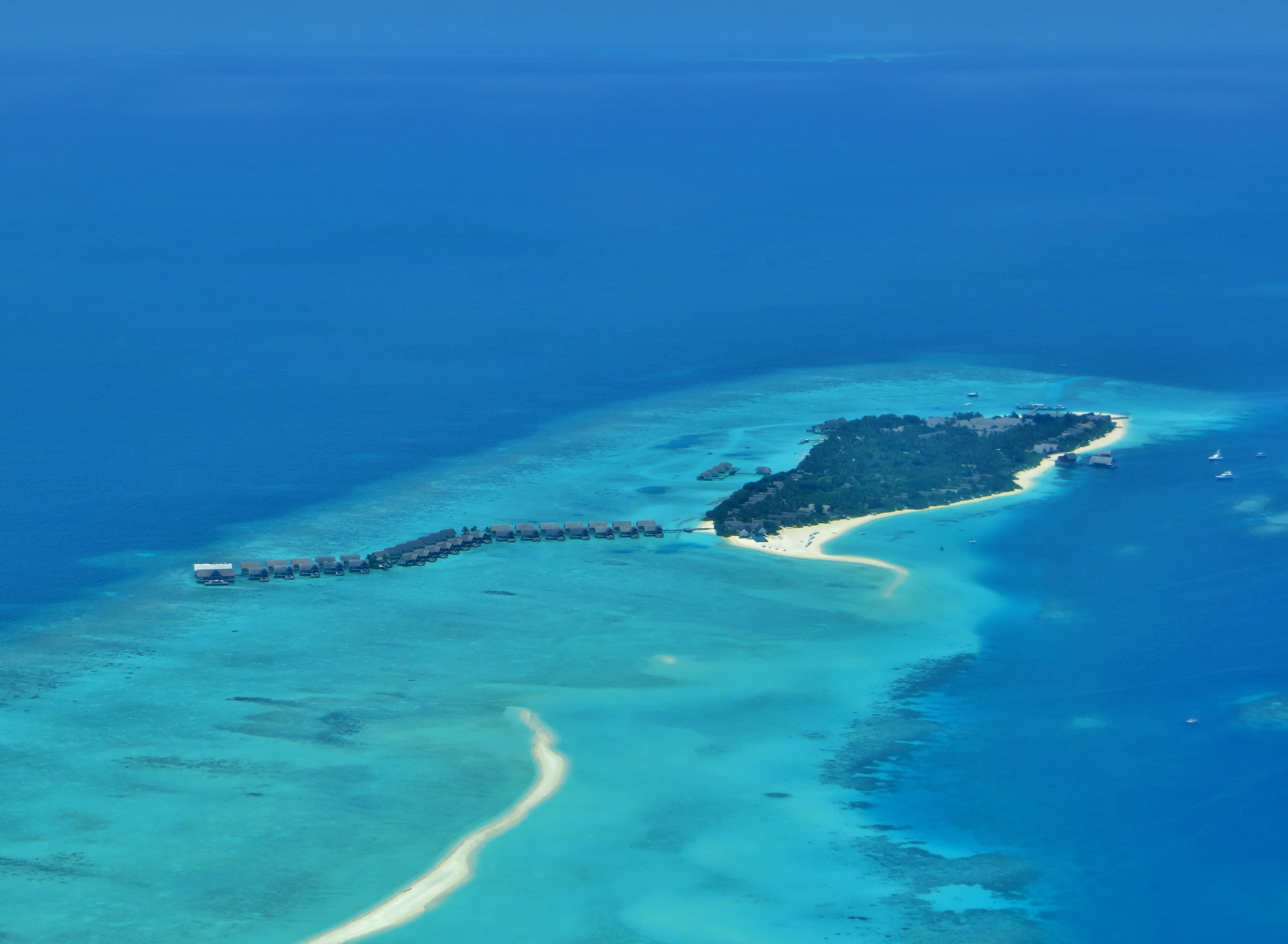
The resort island of Landaa Giraavaru, Baa Atoll, Maldives

A resort island (French Île-hôtel; "hotel island") is a hotel complex located on an island; in many cases one luxury hotel may own the entire island. More broadly, resort island can be defined as any island or an archipelago that contains resorts, hotels, overwater bungalows, restaurants, tourist attractions and its amenities, and might offer all-inclusive accommodations. It primary focus on tourism services and offer leisure, adventure, and amusement opportunities.

Resort island is often confused or identified with island resort, which is a resort located on an island. Island resort is almost the same with seaside resort or beach resort, which offers beaches and water sport activities, such as sunbathing, swimming, snorkeling, scuba diving and surfing, the only difference is that seaside resorts might located on the continent's seaside, while island resorts must be located on an island or archipelago. Maldives has the most island resorts in the world.

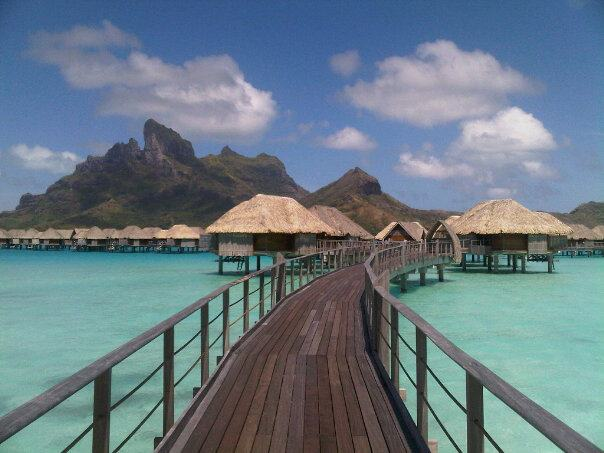
Four Seasons Resort Bora Bora, overwater bungalows at Bora Bora, French Polynesia

Resort islands mostly rely on their natural environment to attract visitors, such as beaches, biodiversity of coral reefs and forest, or secluded and private locations. Others might rely on their man-made built attractions, such as spas, amusement parks, casinos or nightlife.

On the one hand, the development of a small island into a resort often entails serious environmental degradation (reef digging, sewage, sand pumping...); on the other, a resort island complex can provide shelter for heavily poached species, as resorts own security services that no marine protected area can afford.

== Resort islands around the world ==
=== Australia ===
- Bedarra Island
- Brampton Island
- Daydream Island
- Dunk Island
- Fitzroy Island (Queensland)
- Great Keppel Island
- Green Island (Queensland)
- Haggerstone Island
- Hamilton Island (Queensland)
- Hayman Island
- Hinchinbrook Island
- Lindeman Island
- Lizard Island
- Long Island (Whitsunday Islands)
- South Molle Island

=== China ===
- Hainan Island

=== France ===
- Corsica

=== French Polynesia ===
- Bora Bora
- Moorea
- Tahiti

=== Greece ===
- Mykonos
- Santorini
- Crete

=== India ===
- Bangaram Island

=== Indonesia ===
- Bali
- Lombok
- Flores
- Raja Ampat Islands
- Gili Islands
- Bangka Belitung Islands
- Bintan Island
- Derawan Islands
- Mentawai Islands
- Moyo Island
- Sumba
- Saronde Island
- Thousand Islands
- Wakatobi
- Weh Island

=== Iran ===
- Kish

=== Italy ===
- Capri
- Sicily
- Sardinia

=== Japan ===
- Okinawa Islands

=== Korea ===
- Jeju

=== Malaysia ===
- Langkawi
- Sabah

=== Mexico ===
- Cozumel
- Isla Mujeres
- Holbox

=== Mozambique ===
- Vamizi Island
- Bazaruto Archipelago

=== Philippines ===
- Amanpulo
- Balesin Island Club
- Boracay
- Coron
- Mactan
- Siargao
- Sicogon

=== Portugal ===
- Madeira

=== Saudi Arabia ===
- The Red Sea Destination
- Sheybarah Island
- Shura Island

=== Singapore ===
- Sentosa Island

=== Spain ===
- Ibiza
- Mallorca
- Menorca
- Canary Islands

=== Taiwan ===
- Penghu Islands

=== Tanzania ===
- Zanzibar

=== Thailand ===
- Ko Samui
- Phuket

=== United Kingdom ===
- Burgh Island
- Guernsey
- Herm
- Isles of Scilly
- Isle of Wight
- Jersey

=== United States ===
- Hawaii
- Washington Island (Wisconsin)

=== Vietnam ===
- Phu Quoc
