= BeOnd =

International airline in the Maldives

beOnd
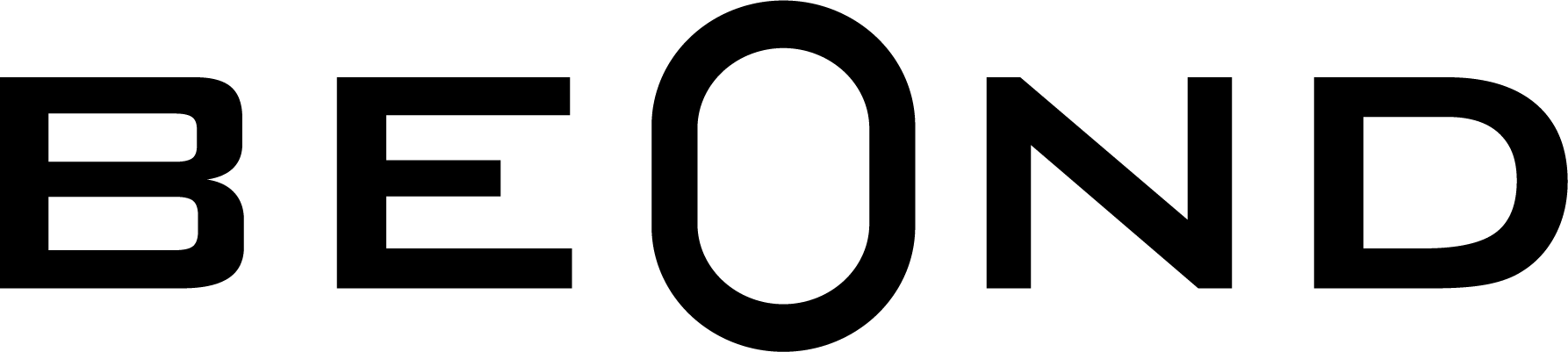

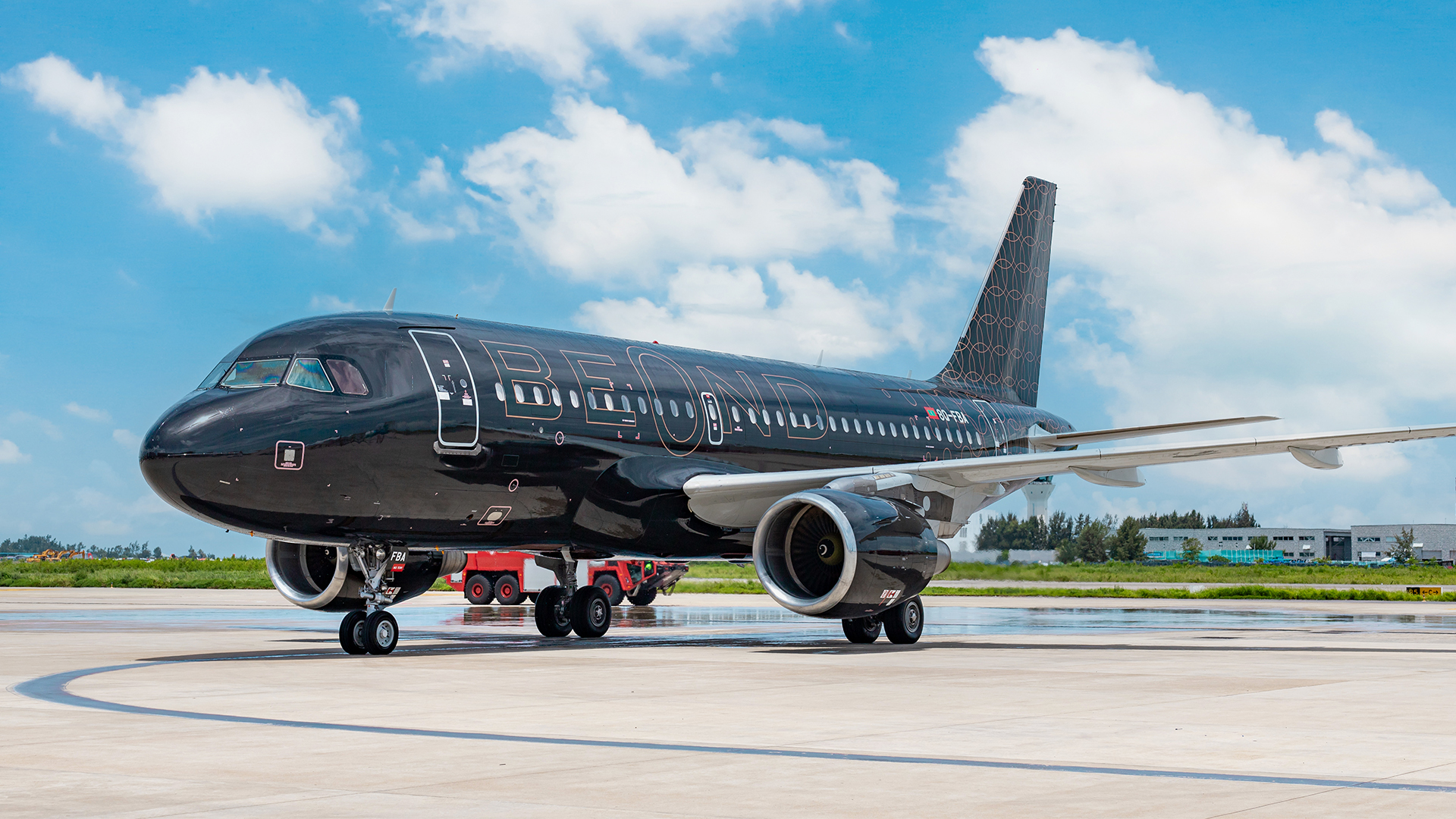
- A Beond Airbus A319-100
IATA	ICAO	Call sign
B4	BYD	BEOND
- Founded: January 2022; 4 years ago
- Commenced operations: 15 November 2023; 2 years ago
- Operating bases: Velana International Airport
- Fleet size: 2
- Destinations: 6
- Parent company: Beond Holding Limited
- Headquarters: Dubai, United Arab Emirates
- Founders: Max Nilov; Sascha Feuerherd; Tero Taskila
- Website: flybeond.com

beOnd is a Maldivian airline headquartered in Dubai and based at Velana International Airport near the capital of the Maldives, Malé. It was founded by Max Nilov and Tero Taskila in November 2022. The airline is a joint venture formed by the investment firm Arabesque, and the Maldivian hospitality company SIMDI Group.

== History ==
=== Foundation ===
The only way to enter the Maldives from all countries is by air. At present, international airlines dominate operations at Velana International Airport, because the Maldives' flag carrier, Maldivian, has too small a fleet to cater to the growth at the airport and to compete with international airlines, along with connecting more worldwide destinations.

Max Nilov, Tero Taskila and Sascha Feuerherd decided to create a new airline by forming a joint venture of two companies, Arabesque and SIMDI Group. beOnd plans to connect the Maldives to multiple European and Asian countries with their cities, as well as to Australia. It announced plans to operate to over 50 destinations in more than 25 countries with a fleet of over 30 aircraft in the next few years.

On 10 August 2023, the first aircraft, an Airbus A319, joined the fleet with 44 lie-flat seats in a 2-2 configuration. Its Airbus A321 joined the fleet on 2 September 2024 with a seat configuration of 68 lie-flat seats in a 2-2 format.

Planned initial destinations were originally disclosed to include Dubai, Delhi, Hong Kong, Milan, Munich, Paris, Riyadh, Singapore, Taipei, Vienna and Zürich and a potential connection to Perth and Melbourne, along with seasonal destinations such as Finland.

=== Start of operations ===
beOnd was originally slated to begin commercial operations by September 2023. The actual start was in November 2023.

In February 2024, the airline announced it would downgrade its services to Munich to a seasonal route, citing economic reasons. At the same time, the new route to Bangkok originally announced for a start in July 2024 had also been cancelled.

== Destinations ==
Countries served by Beond

As of March 2026, beOnd serves the following scheduled destinations.

Country	City	Airport	Notes	Refs
France	Paris	Paris Charles de Gaulle Airport		
Germany	Munich	Munich Airport	Seasonal	
Italy	Milan	Milan Malpensa Airport		
Maldives	Malé	Velana International Airport	Hub	
Russia	Moscow	Sheremetyevo International Airport	Begins 18 December 2026	
Saudi Arabia	Riyadh	King Khalid International Airport		
Saudi Arabia	Red Sea	Red Sea International Airport		
Switzerland	Zürich	Zurich Airport		
United Arab Emirates	Dubai	Al Maktoum International Airport		
United Kingdom	London	London Heathrow Airport		

== Fleet ==
=== Current fleet ===
As of July 2026, BeOnd operates the following aircraft:

Aircraft	In service	Orders	Passengers	Notes
Airbus A319-100	1	—	44	8Q-FBA
Airbus A321-200	1	—	68	8Q-FBB
Total	2	—		

== See also ==
- List of airlines of the Maldives
