= Sindalah =

Island in Tabuk, Saudi Arabia

Sindalah سندالة (Arabic)
- Island
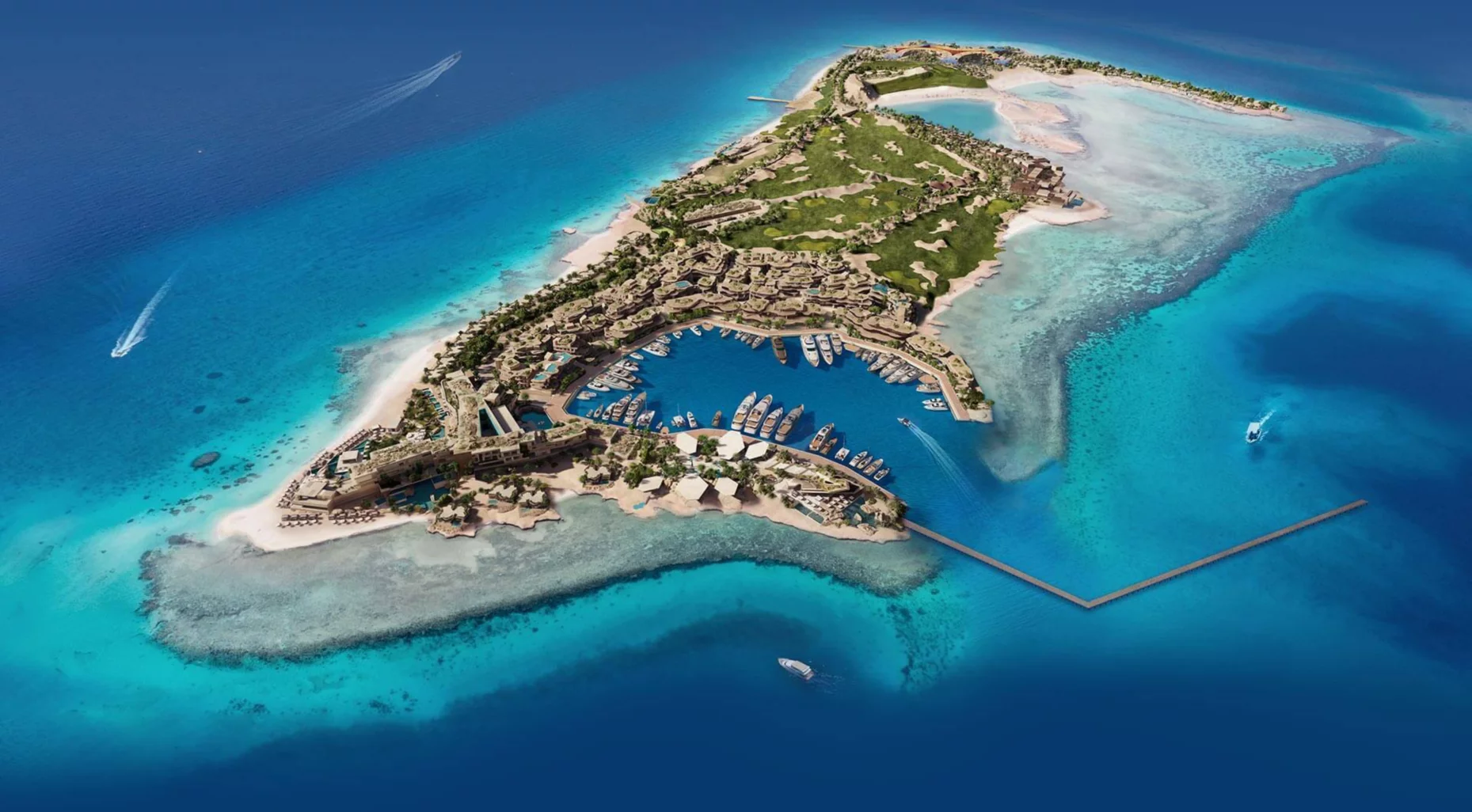
- Concept of the complete project

- Location within Saudi Arabia
- Coordinates: 28°2′49″N 34°42′47″E
- Country: Saudi Arabia
- Province: Tabuk
- City: Neom
- Announced Opened: 5 December 2022; 27 October 2024; 2 years ago
- Founder: Mohammed bin Salman

Area
  - Total: 0.84 km^{2} (0.32 sq mi)
- Elevation: 0 m (0 ft)
- Time zone: UTC+03 (Arabian Standard Time)
- Website: www.neom.com/en-us/regions/sindalah

Sindalah (Arabic: سندالة) is a luxury island destination in Tabuk Province, Saudi Arabia. Sindalah is one of the various announced regions in Neom City. The island covers a total area of 840,000 m^{2} (9 million sq ft). Sindalah held a "grand opening" party in October 2024, three years after its scheduled opening date and coming in at a cost of nearly $4 billion, three times its initial budget. As of August 2025 the resort is still not open to the public.

The luxury island is part of Saudi Arabia's Vision 2030 efforts to decrease dependency on oil within the country by improving urbanization and international tourism. As of 2022, Sindalah aimed to attract 2,400 visitors per day by the year 2028.

== Design ==
The island is 20 acres in size and was designed by Luca Dini who sought it to be akin to a village of luxury resorts. The island has a sports club, spa and wellness center, more than 51 luxury retail outlets, a golf course, and 38 restaurants, 12 of which are run by Michelin star chefs including Carlo Cracco, as well as a MasterChef partnership. Dini wanted the island to also blend into the coral reefs and clear waters of the Red Sea. The island incorporates "interactive" quartz pillars to sensory experiences and includes thousands of coral pieces that were relocated from abroad to "enhance" the existing reef around the island. The urban core of Sindalah is aptly called The Village and consists of luxury hotels and retail offerings.

Sindalah was designed from the ground up to be a superyacht destination, namely to compete with yachting in the Caribbean as a winter destination. The island's marina has 85 berths for yachts up to 165 feet, and buoys just outside the harbor to accommodate yachts up to 550 feet. The island is 17 hours away from most Mediterranean yachting destinations and will act as NEOM’s entry point to the Red Sea - providing easy access for European, Saudi and GCC boat owners.

== History ==
=== Background ===
The island was officially announced in December 2022 by Crown Prince Mohammed bin Salman as part of Saudi Arabia's Vision 2030 to diversify the Saudi economy away from oil. About 40,000 workers worked on the Sindalah project. The Saudi government hired four local contracting partners and up to 60 subcontractors.

Following its announcement, several hotel projects are currently in the pipeline on Sindalah. Marriott International has signed a deal to open three properties in 2024, including a 70-key Luxury Collection beach resort, a 115-key Luxury Collection city hotel, and a 66-key Autograph Collection, while a 277-key Four Seasons hotel is slated for opening in 2026.

=== Opening party ===
Sindalah announced its opening on 27 October 2024, with a party organized by Robb Report consisting of 65 superyachts with celebrities including Alicia Keys, Katherine Jenkins, and Chris Tucker alongside the Armenian State Symphony Orchestra. The opening party cost at least $45 million, according to Neom official documents. At the time of its opening the island was still under development, with the island planning 413 luxury hotel rooms and 333 apartments.

Project sponsor Crown Prince Mohammed bin Salman was expected to be at the opening ceremony, but he did not show. The Times reported that the crown prince was "unimpressed" with the megaproject and Dini's design, and fired Neom CEO Nadhmi al-Nasr shortly afterwards.

== Status ==
Despite the "opening" party, the Wall Street Journal reported that as of March 2025, Sindalah remains closed to the public and its fate is uncertain.

== See also ==
- The Line
- Trojena
- The Red Sea Project
- Amaala
- Gulf of Aqaba
