= Red Sea International Airport =

International airport in Saudi Arabia

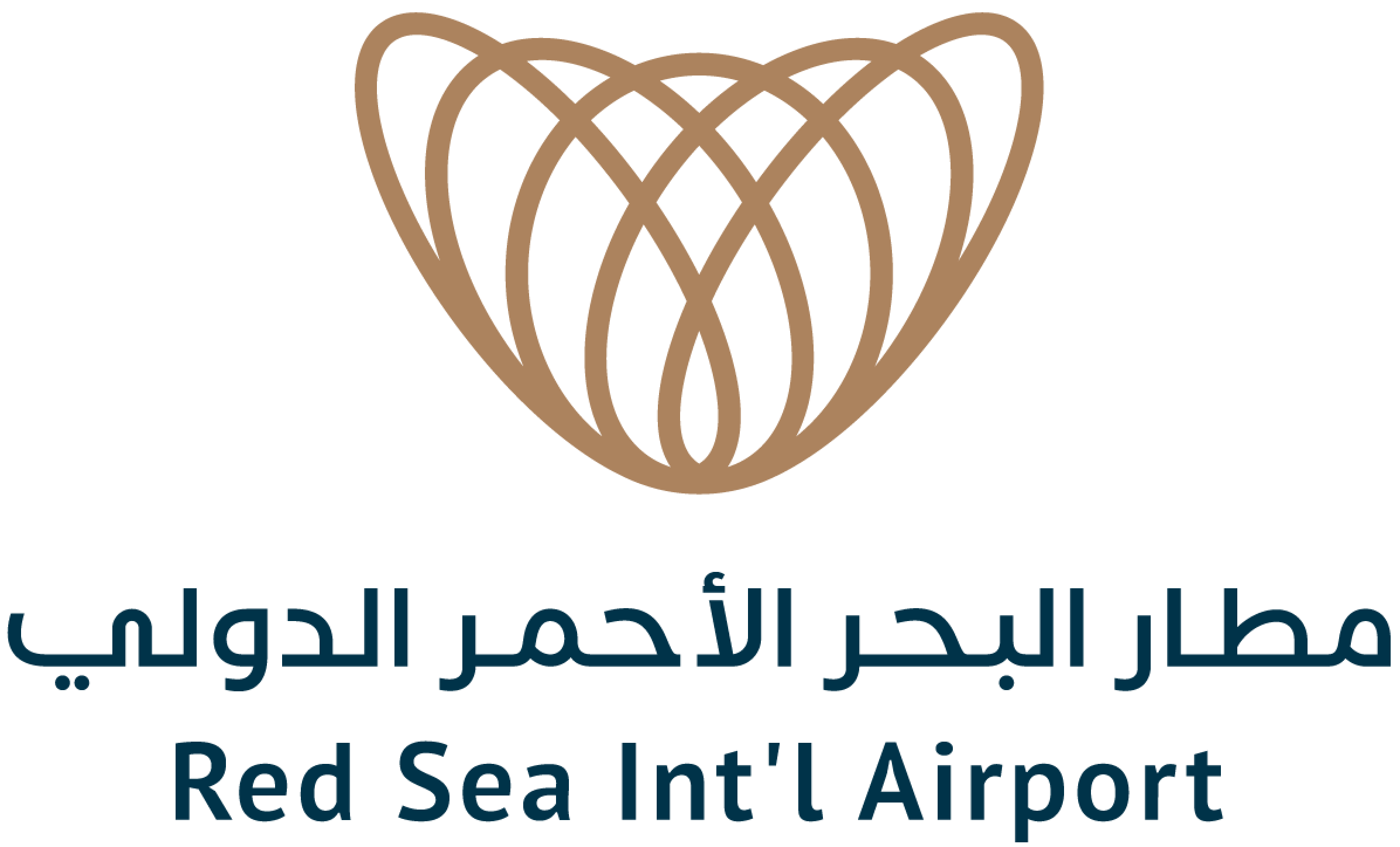
- IATA: RSI; ICAO: OERS

Summary
- Airport type: Public
- Owner: Red Sea Global
- Serves: The Red Sea Destination
- Location: Hanak, Tabuk Province, Saudi Arabia
- Opened: 21 September 2023; 3 years ago
- Elevation AMSL: 164 ft (50 m)
- Coordinates: 25°37′49″N 37°4′42″E
- Website: rsiairport.sa/en/

Map
- Location in Saudi Arabia RSI/OERS (Middle East) RSI/OERS (Asia)

Runways
Direction	Length		Surface
Direction	m	ft	Surface
15/33	3,700	12,139	Asphalt

Red Sea International Airport (IATA: RSI, ICAO: OERS) is an international airport in Hanak, Tabuk Province in northwestern Saudi Arabia serving the tourism megaproject in development The Red Sea Destination. Designed by British architects Foster + Partners, the airport began operations on 21 September 2023, and is expected to serve one million passengers per year in 2030.

== Background ==
The airport is purposely situated 20 km from the coastal lagoons and islands that are also in development as part of The Red Sea Destination. The airport will be able to serve amphibious seaplanes with a dedicated water runway.

=== History ===
On 20 and 21 July 2022, the first flight tests were carried out at the airport.

On 21 September 2023, Saudia launched the first regular service between King Khalid International Airport in Riyadh and Red Sea International, operating twice weekly on Thursdays and Saturdays.

On 18 April 2024, Red Sea International Airport welcomed its first international flight from Dubai International Airport via flydubai.

== Airlines and destinations ==
=== Passenger ===
Airlines	Destinations
BeOnd	London–Heathrow (begins 15 December 2026), Malé, Milan–Malpensa, Moscow–Sheremetyevo (begins 18 December 2026), Paris–Charles de Gaulle (begins 17 December 2026)
flydubai	Dubai–International
Qatar Airways	Doha
Saudia	Jeddah, Riyadh

== See also ==
- List of airports in Saudi Arabia
- List of the busiest airports in the Middle East
- Red Sea Global
- Amaala
