= Red Sea Global =

Saudi real estate development company

- Native name: البحر الأحمر الدولية
- Formerly: The Red Sea Development Company (TRSDC)
- Type: Private
- Industry: Real estate development
- Founded: 31 July 2017; 9 years ago
- Founder: Mohammed bin Salman
- Headquarters: Tabuk, Saudi Arabia
- Key people: Mohammed Bin Salman (Chairman); John Pagano (CEO); Ahmad Darwish (CAO)
- Owner: Public Investment Fund
- Subsidiaries: The Red Sea Destination; Amaala; Thuwal; RSG Hospitality; Fly Red Sea; Red Sea Residences; Botanica; Red Sea Health
- Website: www.redseaglobal.com/en/

Red Sea Global (RSG; Arabic: البحر الأحمر الدولية), previously The Red Sea Development Company, is a fully integrated real estate developer and operator based in Tabuk, Saudi Arabia. The company was founded in July 2017 by the Saudi crown prince Mohammed bin Salman, and is owned by the Public Investment Fund. As one of Saudi Arabia's Vision 2030 goals, Red Sea Global aims to diversify the Saudi economy away from fossil fuels by contributing to the growth of its tourism sector.

== History ==
Red Sea Global was officially launched by the Saudi Public Investment Fund on 31 July 2017 as "The Red Sea Development Company". It is one of the 5 Saudi Vision 2030 megaprojects which are Neom, Roshn, Qiddiya City, and Diriyah Company.

== Projects ==
=== The Red Sea destination ===
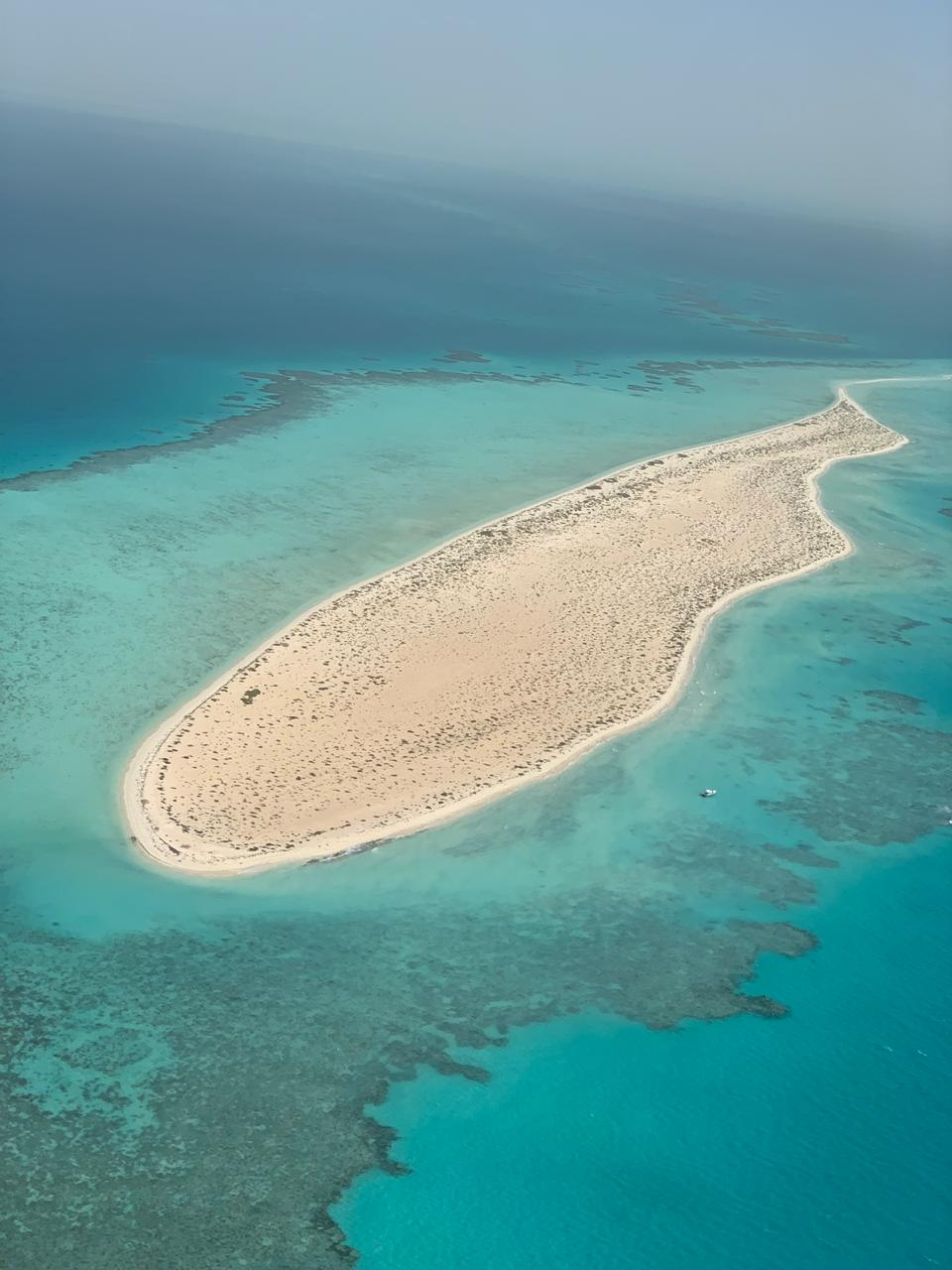
One of the 92 islands that form an archipelago at The Red Sea tourism destination on the west coast of Saudi Arabia.

Built in an archipelago consisting of 92 different islands, The Red Sea destination is the largest of Red Sea Global's projects in terms of scale, covering more than 28,000 square kilometres. The construction of the project official began in February 2019. As of October 2026, 13 luxury resorts are operational and welcoming guests.

The Red Sea is the first destination in the world to be Forbes Travel Guide Verified.

The project includes the following destinations:

- Shura Island: The island is the main hub of The Red Sea project. Shura island is home to the Coral Bloom resort cluster project designed by Foster and Partners.
- Ummahat Islands: Ummahat is home to both St. Regis Red Sea Resort and Nujuma, a The Ritz-Carlton Reserve.
- Sheybarah Island: The island is home to Shebara Resort, which features reflective overwater orb villas designed by Killa Design. The 150-ton villas were transported and installed by Mammoet.
- Southern Dunes: A luxury inland resort by Six Senses, 100km northeast of the town of Umluj.
- Desert Rock: A luxury inland resort of villas and hotel rooms carved into granite mountains. The destination is designed by Oppenheim Architecture.
- Laheq Island: a 400-hectare private residential island. The island was designed by Foster and Partners and is expected to be open in 2028.

The Red Sea destination is accessed by the Red Sea International Airport (RSI). The airport began operations in September 2023 with an inaugural flight from King Khalid International Airport, Riyadh, via Saudia. In April 2024, the airport received its first international flight from Dubai International Airport via flydubai.

=== AMAALA ===
Announced in September 2018, AMAALA is a tourist destination that covers an area of 3,800 km^{2}. It is located around 200 kilometres north of The Red Sea destination on Saudi Arabia's northwest coast. The nearest airport is Al Wajh International, located around 45 minutes from AMAALA, or Red Sea International Airport which is 90 minutes from AMAALA.

AMAALA is a luxury tourist destination with a focus on wellness and personal development.

As of October 2026, 7 of 9 luxury resorts are operational. These include properties from Four Seasons, Six Senses, Rosewood, Equinox, Nammos and Jayasom.

The AMAALA Yacht Club is a focal point of the marina and in July 2027 will host the Grand Finale of The Ocean Race.

=== Thuwal ===
Opened in December 2024, Thuwal is a buy-out-only private island for up to 12 guests. Thuwal covers an area of 17,000 m^{2}.

== Sustainability and regenerative tourism ==
Red Sea Global (RSG) is taking a regenerative approach to its tourism developments at The Red Sea and AMAALA, building ecosystems that are better for people and planet.

RSG is targeting a 30% net conservation gain across its destinations by 2040, by enhancing biologically diverse habitats including mangroves, seagrass, corals, and land vegetation.

Before development commenced, RSG conducted comprehensive environmental baseline surveys across marine, coastal, and terrestrial ecosystems to establish a robust benchmark for measuring long-term environmental impact and tracking progress against conservation and regeneration goals.

As of end of 2025, 3.1 million mangrove seedlings had been planted, 100 artificial reef habitats deployed and 10,000 coral fragments restored.

RSG's landscape nursery, Botanica, has grown and provided 11 million plants to destinations so far. In total, it will provide 15-18 million plants for The Red Sea and AMAALA.

The Red Sea and AMAALA are 100% powered by sunlight thanks to 1.1 million+ PV panels and one of the world’s largest off-grid battery energy storage system (BESS) at 1,900+ MWh.

== Promotion ==
In March 2024, famous football player Cristiano Ronaldo, which at the time was a player for the Saudi team Al Nassr, visited the Red Sea destination. Ronaldo promoted the destination on his Instagram account, which at the time had more the 600 million followers.

In April 2024, Red Sea Global announced a collaboration with Warner Bros. Discovery to produce a documentary titled "Beneath the Surface: The Fight for Corals". This collaboration has resulted in a number of short films covering everything from sustainability to supply chain, archaeology to astronomy.

In June 2023, Red Sea Global signed a deal with Al-Ahli Football Club to become its platinum sponsor. In August 2026, that sponsorship transferred to AMAALA, Red Sea Global's latest tourism destination.

In July 2025, Red Sea Global signed a three-year sponsorship deal with South Korean esports organization T1. The terms of the agreement include the company's name on the front of T1's jerseys, and sponsoring T1's video content.

== See also ==
- List of Saudi Vision 2030 Projects
- Saudi Red Sea Authority
- Saudi Vision 2030
- Public Investment Fund
