= The Red Sea Destination =

Tourism megaproject in Saudi Arabia

The Red Sea البحر الأحمر (Arabic)
- Tourism destination
- Logo

- Location within Saudi Arabia
- Coordinates: 25°30′18″N 36°57′18″E
- Province: Tabuk Province
- Country: Saudi Arabia
- Body of water: Red Sea
- Announced: 31 July 2017; 9 years ago

Government
  - CEO: John Pagano

Area
  - Total: 28,000 km^{2} (11,000 sq mi)
- Time zone: UTC+03 (Arabian Standard Time)
- Developer: Red Sea Global
- Website: www.visitredsea.com/en/

The Red Sea Destination (Arabic: مشروع البحر الأحمر), simply referred to as The Red Sea (Arabic: البحر الأحمر), is a tourism megaproject on the Red Sea coast of Saudi Arabia. The project, which is developed by Public Investment Fund-owned Red Sea Global, forms part of the Saudi Vision 2030 program. The project was announced by the Saudi crown prince Mohammad bin Salman in July 2017. The Red Sea aims to have 50 hotels with 8,000 rooms, and more than 1,000 residential properties across 22 islands and 6 inland sites.

== Location ==
The project is located on the west coast of Saudi Arabia in a 28,000 km^{2} area in Tabuk province between the cities of Umluj and Al-Wajh. The area includes more than 90 unspoiled offshore islands, 200 km of coastline on the Red Sea, beaches, desert, mountains and volcanoes. This also incorporates the Al Wajh lagoon, a pristine 2,081 km^{2} area that includes valuable habitats (coral reefs, seagrass, and mangroves) and species of global conservation importance.

== History ==
The project was announced by crown prince Mohammed bin Salman in July 2017 as one of Saudi Arabia's Vision 2030 projects to diversify the Saudi economy away from fossil fuels. The project is developed by Red Sea Global, one of the various companies founded by the Public Investment Fund, Saudi Arabia's sovereign wealth fund.

Construction began at The Red Sea in February 2019 and was expected to be completed by 2030. The first three hotels were expected to open in 2023, while 16 hotels, the Red Sea International Airport, a yachting marina, historical sites and recreation centers were expected to open in 2024.

In November 2023, The Red Sea Project's first destination, Six Senses Southern Dunes, was opened for guests.

In January 2024, St. Regis Hotels & Resorts opened The Red Sea Project's second destination, and its first island resort, in the Ummahat Islands archipelago. The following May, the Ummahat Islands welcomed its second hotel, Nujuma, a Ritz-Carlton Reserve.

In October 2024, Red Sea Global announced the opening of Shebara Resort the following November, making it the project's fourth destination to start welcoming visitors.

In December 2024, Desert Rock Resort became the second inland and the fifth overall destination to open its doors to guests.

In September 2025, Shura Island, the main hub island of the project, opened 3 of its 11 total resorts. These resorts were InterContinental The Red Sea Resort, SLS The Red Sea Resort, and The Red Sea Edition Resort.

== Destinations ==
The Red Sea Project consists of 6 tourist destinations as of September 2025. Two of the destinations, Southern Dunes and Desert Rock, are located inland. The other four destinations are located on 4 of the 92-island archipelago.

=== Shura Island ===
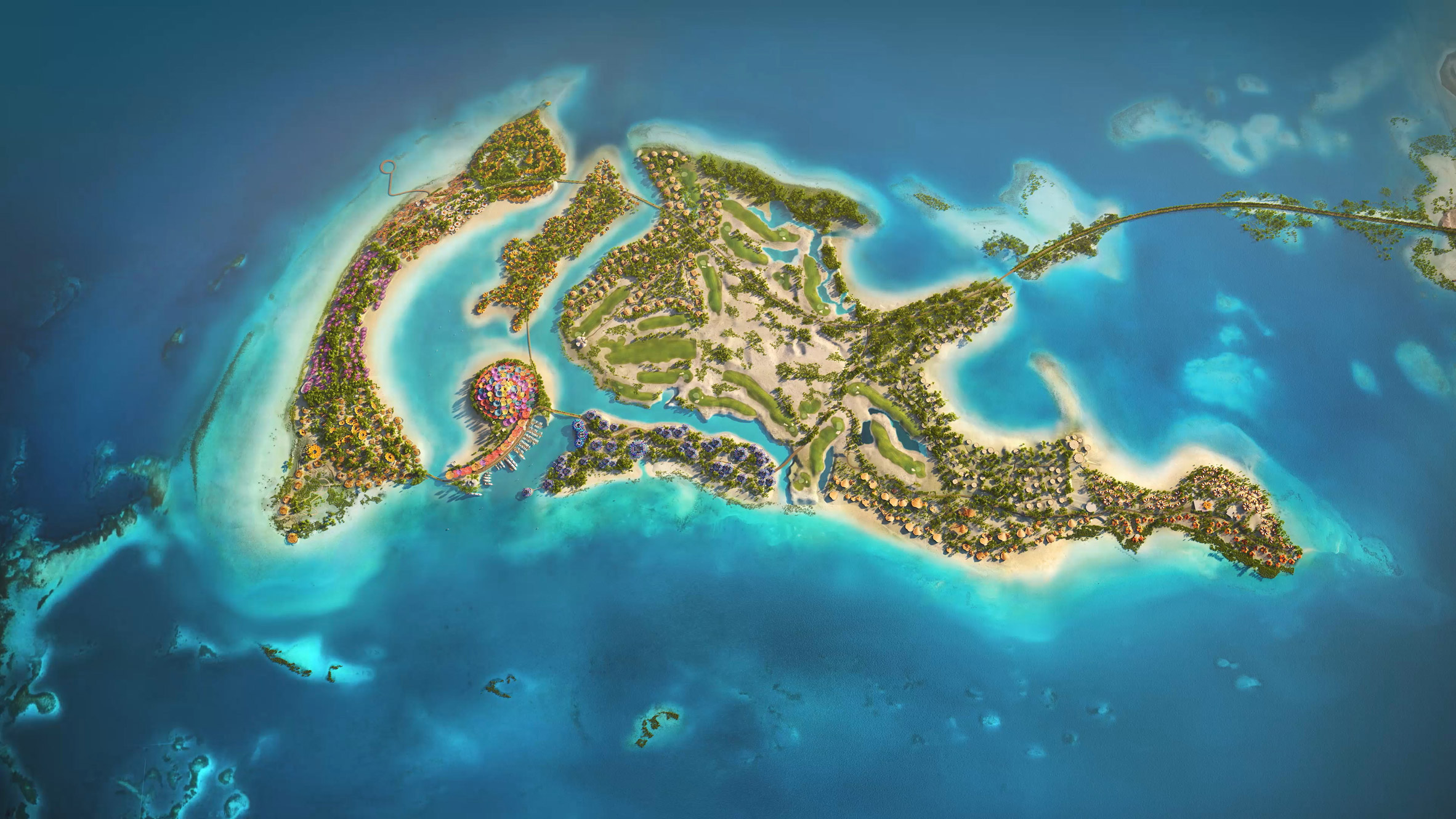
Concept of Coral Bloom project on Shura Island

Shura Island, also known as Shurayrah Island, is the hub island of The Red Sea Project. The island is home to Coral Bloom, the project's most ambitious construction project. Coral Bloom was launched in February 2021 by crown prince Mohammed bin Salman. The project is designed by London-based architecture firm Foster + Partners.

The island will host 11 hotels from various brands, including Hyatt, Fairmont, InterContinental, Rosewood, Jumeirah, Faena, Raffles, Miraval, Edition, and SLS. In addition, it will include Shura Links, Saudi Arabia's first 18-hole golf course and clubhouse. The 7,500 yard course was designed by Brian Curley, with the clubhouse designed by Foster + Partners and is expected to open in 2025.

Shura is linked to the mainland by Saudi Arabia's longest water bridge, which stretches a total of 1.2 km. The bridge was designed and constructed by Athens-based construction firm Archirodon.

In October 2023, Red Sea Global signed a $533 million deal with Kingdom Holding Company to open a Four Seasons resort on the island. The hotel is expected to open in early 2025.

=== Ummahat Islands ===
The Ummahat Islands archipelago, also known as Ummhat Alshaikh Islands, hosts both St. Regis Red Sea Resort and Nujuma, a Ritz Carlton Reserve. Both are accessible via a seaplane or a chartered boat.

==== Nujuma, a Ritz-Carlton Reserve ====
Nujuma was named the best new hotel by Forbes., by 2026 Forbes Travel Guide completed its inspection of Nujuma and awarded it 5 Stars, Nujuma is ranked as the Top Hotel in the Red Sea by Hotels Digest, Nujuma was ranked second by Michelin Keys.

The 63-key Nujuma, a Ritz-Carlton Reserve, opened in May 2024 as the most expensive hotel in the Middle East, costing around $3,431 a night. It is the seventh Ritz-Carlton property within the Reserve sub-brand and the first to be located in the Middle East. The Reserve has 63 luxury villas, each with a sea view private pool. Nujuma was designed by Foster + Partners.

==== The St. Regis Red Sea Resort ====
The St. Regis was the first island destination to start welcoming guests in the Red Sea Project in January 2024. The 90-key resort was designed by Kengo Kuma.

=== Sheybarah Island ===
Sheybarah Island is home to Shebara Resort, a 73-room luxury hotel that is managed by a hotel brand created by Red Sea Global named "Red Sea Global Hospitality". The resort consists of overwater reflective stainless steel villas made in the shape of orbs, designed by Dubai-based architecture firm Killa Design. The resort opened its doors in November 2024.

The 150-ton villas were created by Grankraft in Sharjah, then transported to the island and installed by Mammoet.

Shebara was featured in the 2025 "World's Greatest Places" list by Time Magazine.

=== Southern Dunes ===
Six Senses Southern Dunes is an inland resort located in Alnesai desert, almost a 100 km northeast of the town of Umluj. The resort includes 40 villas and a 36-room hotel complex. Southern Dunes was the first Red Sea Project destination to start welcoming visitors in November 2023.

Southern Dunes was designed by Foster + Partners.

=== Desert Rock ===
Desert Rock is a 64-key inland luxury resort of villas and hotel rooms built into granite mountains. The resort officially opened bookings starting from 11 December 2024.

Desert Rock was designed by Miami-based Oppenheim Architecture.

=== Laheq Island ===
Laheq Island, also known as Abu Laheq Island, is a 400-hectare private residential island. The announcement of Laheq in April 2025 marked the beginning of the second phase of the Red Sea Project. The island is expected to open in 2028.

The main feature of the island is "The Ring", an 800-meter structure encircling the island's lagoon, housing luxury apartments, hotels, and retail spaces. The island was designed by Foster + Partners.

== Transportation ==
The Red Sea Project can be accessed via the Red Sea International Airport, a dedicated airport set to be fully completed in 2025. The airport received its first flight in September 2023 by Saudia from King Khalid International Airport, Riyadh. The first international flight to the airport was by flydubai from Dubai International Airport in April 2024. The airport, whose curved design is inspired by sand dunes, was designed by Foster + Partners.

Upon arrival to the airport, Lucid Air electric vehicles are used to transport visitors to their destinations. Saudi Arabia's sovereign wealth fund, the Public Investment Fund, owns over 60% stake at Lucid Motors. The Red Sea Project includes Saudi Arabia's largest off-grid charging network, which has 150 charging stations to serve its initial fleet of 80 Lucid Air and Mercedes-Benz EQS EVs. A 400-MW solar microgrid with 1.3 GWh battery is being built to supply the area.

Some island sites, such as Ummahat islands, are only accessible via yachts and seaplanes. Red Sea Global established Saudi Arabia's first seaplane company, Fly Red Sea, which will transport visitors to the islands using an initial fleet of 4 Cessna Caravan 208 seaplanes.

== Promotion ==
In March 2024, famous football player Cristiano Ronaldo, who at the time was a player for the Saudi team Al Nassr, visited St. Regis Red Sea Resort in the Red Sea destination. Ronaldo promoted the destination on his Instagram account, which at the time had more than 600 million followers. The following June, he visited Nujuma, a Ritz-Carlton Reserve, shortly after it started welcoming visitors.

In April 2024, Red Sea Global announced a collaboration with Warner Bros. Discovery to produce a documentary titled "Beneath the Surface: The Fight for Corals".

== See also ==
- List of Saudi Vision 2030 Projects
- Tourism in Saudi Arabia
- Amaala
- Saudi Red Sea Authority
- Sindalah
