= Al-Wajh Domestic Airport =

Airport in Saudi Arabia

Al-Wajh Domestic Airport مطار الوجه المحلي
- IATA: EJH; ICAO: OEWJ

Summary
- Airport type: Public
- Owner: General Authority of Civil Aviation
- Operator: General Authority of Civil Aviation
- Serves: Al-Wajh and Umluj
- Location: Al-Wajh, Tabuk Province, Saudi Arabia
- Opened: 1977; 49 years ago
- Elevation AMSL: 66 ft / 20 m
- Coordinates: 26°11′54″N 036°28′34″E

Map
- Location of airport in Saudi Arabia

Runways
Direction	Length		Surface
Direction	m	ft	Surface
15/33	3,050	10,007	Asphalt

Al-Wajh Domestic Airport (IATA: EJH, ICAO: OEWJ) is an airport located in the city of Al-Wajh, serving Al-Wajh Governorate and the neighboring governorate of Umluj in Saudi Arabia.

== Facilities ==
The airport resides at an elevation of 66 feet (20 m) above mean sea level. It has one runway designated 15/33 with an asphalt surface measuring 3,050 by 45 metres (10,007 ft × 148 ft).

== Airlines and destinations ==
Airlines offering scheduled passenger service:

Airlines	Destinations
Saudia	Jeddah, Riyadh

== See also ==
- List of airports in Saudi Arabia
