= Ras Alsheikh Hamid =

Coordinates: 28.1329677°N 34.5928069°E

Ras Alsheikh Hamid (Arabic: راس الشيخ حميد) is an uninhabited headland located in the Tabuk Region in Saudi Arabia between the beginning of the Gulf of Aqaba and the end of the Red Sea. It is known to be the location where Catalina N5593V, a Consolidated PBY-5A amphibious aircraft have landed in 1960 with an American family on board, where later were found and taken to Jeddah and handed to the American Embassy there.

In April 2016, the Saudi Arabia and Egypt approved the Saudi Egypt Causeway. A plan suggested that the causeway will link Ras Alsheikh Hamid to Sharm el-Sheikh.

Western end of THE LINE
