= Archirodon =

Greek construction company

Archirodon Group NV
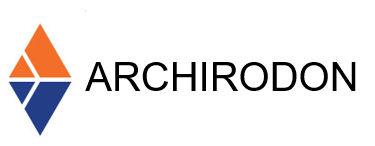
- Company type: Private
- Industry: Construction, Marine services, Oil & Gas
- Founded: 1959
- Headquarters: Dordrecht, Netherlands & Athens, Greece
- Area served: Europe, Middle East, Africa, CIS, United States
- Key people: Hazem Sadek (CEO)
- Revenue: €1 billion (2021)
- Number of employees: 16,000 (2022)
- Website: http://www.archirodon.net

Archirodon Group NV is a Dutch entity with headquarters in Dordrecht, Netherlands and major presence in KSA, UAE, Egypt and Greece, that provides services relating to the construction and maintenance of maritime infrastructure and other construction works on an international basis. The main fields of construction work are marine, dredging and land reclamation contractors; heavy contractors for the oil and gas, power and water industries; electromechanical and infrastructure contractors; geotechnical and foundation engineering services.

Archirodon owns and operates a fleet of 155 vessels which are used for transportation, dredging, towing and docking.

== History ==
Archirodon Construction company was established in 1959 in the form of a J.V. of the Greek firms ARCHIMIDIS, Greece's foremost marine contractor at that time, and ODON & ODOSTROMATON, a road and bridge construction specialist group.

The J.V. started its professional life by building the Port of Benghazi in Libya (1961) and subsequently the Port of Beirut in Lebanon (1962). Its success soon led it to develop into a major contractor in its own merit, establishing itself in 1971 as ARCHIRODON CONSTRUCTION (OVERSEAS) CO.S.A...

== Major Projects ==
- Jorf Lasfar
- Al Hamriya Port
- Port of Jebel Ali -Terminal-2
- Port of Tripoli
- Khalifa Port
- Sheikh Zayed Bridge
- Port of Salalah
- Palm Islands
- King Salman International Complex for Maritime Industries and Service
- Shura island bridge in The Red Sea Project

== Offices ==
Archirodon maintains offices in:

- Dubai, Abu Dhabi & Ras Al Khaimah, United Arab Emirates
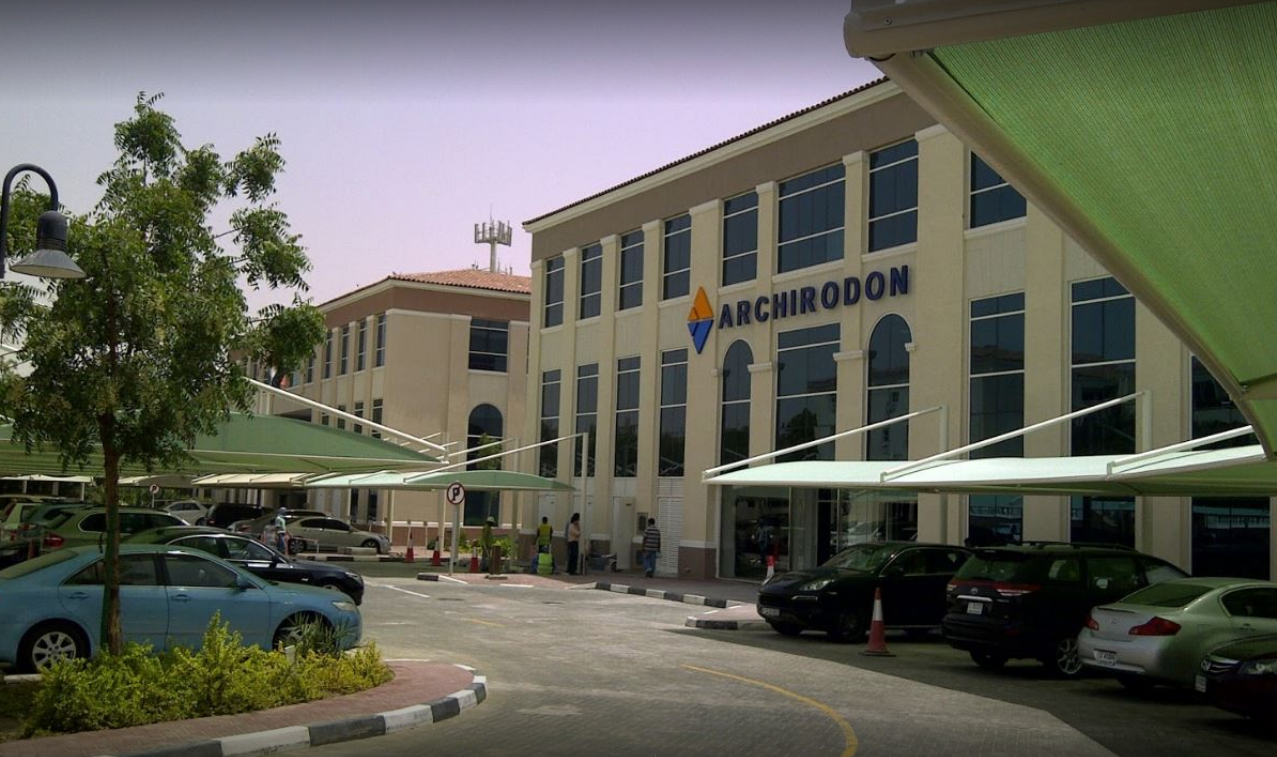
  Arco Dubai office
- Cairo, Egypt
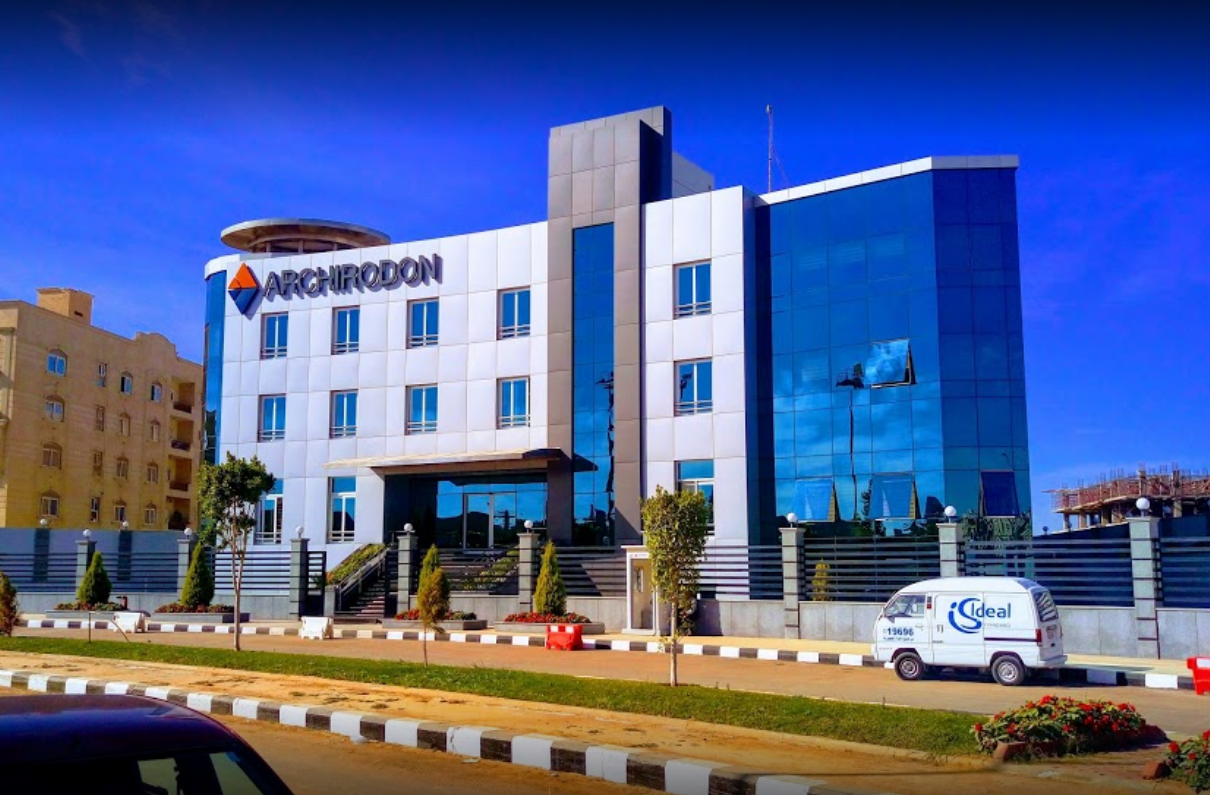
  Arco Cairo office
- Jeddah and KSA, Saudi Arabia
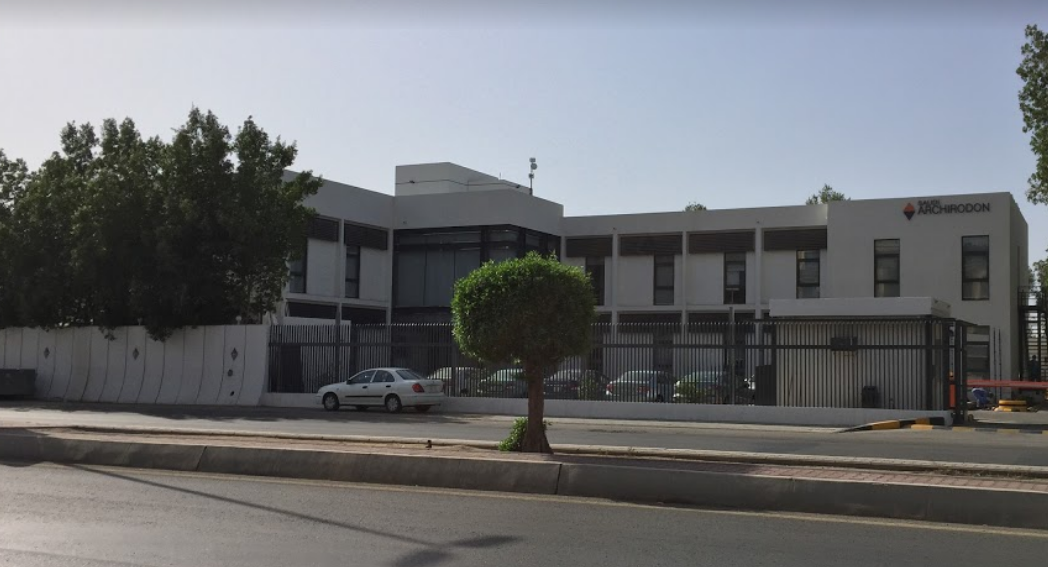
  Arco Saudi office
- Dordrecht, Netherlands
- Aktau, Kazakhstan
- Ashgabat, Turkmenistan
- Athens, Greece
- Limassol, Cyprus
- Arlington, Virginia, United States
- Casablanca, Morocco
- Muscat, Oman
- Geneva, Switzerland

== Subsidiaries ==
Subsidiary	Country	Area
Archirodon Construction (Overseas) Company Limited	Cyprus	Europe
Archirodon N.V	Greece	Europe
Archipetrol S.A	Greece	Europe
Archirodon Group N.V	Netherlands	Europe
Overseas Dredging Rental B.V	Netherlands	Europe
Archirodon Construction (Overseas) Co. S.A.	Switzerland	Europe
SemArco LLP	Kazakhstan	Europe
ARCHIRODON CONSTRUCTION (OVERSEAS) CO. S.A. KUWAIT	Kuwait	Middle East
HANI ARCHIRODON LLC	Oman	Middle East
ARCHIRODON CONSTRUCTION (OVERSEAS) CO. S.A	Qatar	Middle East
SAUDI ARCHIRODON LTD	Saudi Arabia	Middle East
SAUDI CONDRECO LTD.	Saudi Arabia	Middle East
ARCHIRODON CONSTRUCTION (OVERSEAS) CO. LTD.	United Arab Emirates	Middle East
ARCOMET FZC	United Arab Emirates	Middle East
ARCHIRODON CONSTRUCTION (OVERSEAS) CO. S.A. Egypt	Egypt	Africa
ARCHIRODON CONSTRUCTION (OVERSEAS) CO. S.A.	Libya	Africa
Archirodon Group N.V	Morocco	Africa
American International Contractors, Inc	United States	America

== Criticism ==
In 2001, Archirodon was involved in corruption and bid-rigging with construction bids for Egyptian water projects as discussed in the Camp David peace accord.

In 2022, Archirodon drew criticism on its involvement in the port of El Aaiún, in the disputed territory of the Western Sahara, from where OCP currently only exports phosphate rock.
