= Brian Curley =

American golf course architect

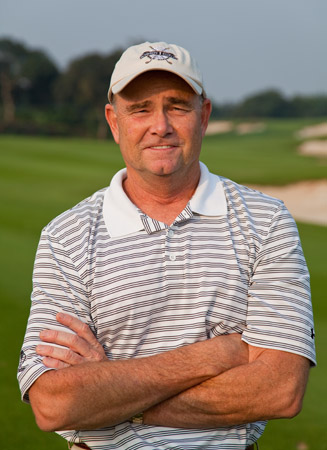
Brian Curley

Brian Curley (born November 12, 1959) is a golf course architect. He was raised in Pebble Beach, California where he played, caddied and worked at the area’s iconic courses. He currently resides in Scottsdale, Arizona. Curley is a member of the American Society of Golf Course Architects (ASGCA) and currently serves on its Board of Governors.

== Education ==
Curley is a 1982 graduate of the School of Architecture and Environmental Design, California Polytechnic University, San Luis Obispo, California.

== Work experience ==
Much of his early years in design were spent working alongside golf course designer Pete Dye and future design partner, Lee Schmidt, while working with Landmark Design Company from 1984 to 1992. Formative years were spent building Kiawah Island (Ocean Course) among other golf courses under Pete Dye.

In 1997, he and Schmidt formed Schmidt-Curley Design, working primarily in the southwest United States.

Schmidt-Curley soon focused much of its business interests on the burgeoning Asian market with a strong emphasis on China. They are considered leaders of the China golf course development movement and were subsequently cited by Golf Inc. in 2011 as one of golf’s most influential architects. Schmidt-Curley was also named “Architect of the Year” by GOLF Magazine in 2011 and “Best Golf Course Architect – Asia-Pacific” by Asian Golf Monthly in both 2011 and 2012. Curley’s design credits include 20 courses at China’s Mission Hills Golf Club.

Schmidt-Curley designed the 10 courses at Mission Hills Haikou, “World’s Largest Golf Club”, which opened in 2010 and is located one hour north of Hong Kong. The resort’s Lava Fields Course was named the “Best New Course” in the International category by GOLF Magazine in 2011. The Blackstone Course was voted the “No. 1 Course in China” and “Best Championship Course – Asia-Pacific” in 2012 by Asian Golf Monthly.

== Golf Courses (Original Design) ==
United States of America

- Bali Hai Golf Club - Paradise, Nevada
- Crosby National Golf Club - Rancho Santa Fe, California
- The Plantation - Indio, California
- Marriott's Shadow Ridge - Palm Desert, California
- Oak Quarry, California
- Shadow Hills Golf Club-Indio, California
- Southern Dunes Golf Club - Maricopa, Arizona
- The Wilderness Club - Eureka, Montana

Egypt

- Katameya Dunes - New Cairo, Egypt

Saudi Arabia

- Shura Links - The Red Sea Project, Saudi Arabia

Sweden

- Vidbynäs Golf Club - Stockholm, Sweden (2 Courses)

Cambodia

- Phnom Penh, East (expected 2024)
- Phnom Penh, West (expected 2024)

China

- Mission Hills Golf Club - Shenzhen, China (10 courses)
- Mission Hills Golf Club - Haikou, China (10 courses)
- Stone Forest International Country Club - Kunming, China (3 Courses)
- Tianjin Binhai Lake - Tianjin, China (2 Courses)

Mexico

- Amanali Country Club, Mexico City, Mexico

Thailand

- Chiangmai Highlands Golf, Chiang Mai, Thailand
- Siam Country Club (Old), Chon Buri, Thailand
- Siam Country Club (Plantation), Chon Buri, Thailand
- Siam Country Club (Rolling Hills), Chon Buri, Thailand

Vietnam

- An Bien, Ha Long, Vietnam
- FLC Halong Bay, Ha Long, Vietnam
- FLC Quang Binh (Ocean Dunes), Dong Hoi, Vietnam
- FLC Quang Binh (Forest Dunes), Dong Hoi, Vietnam
- FLC Quy Nhon (Mountain), Binh Dinh, Vietnam
- Stone Valley #2, Hanoi, Vietnam
- Stone Valley #3, Hanoi, Vietnam

== Select awards ==
- GOLF Magazine – “Architect of the Year” (2011)
- Asian Golf Monthly – “Best Golf Course Architects” (2011, 2012, 2013)
- GOLF Magazine – “Best New” Asia Course (Blackstone Course, Mission Hills Hainan) (2010)
- GOLF Magazine – “Best New” International Course (Lava Fields Course, Mission Hills Hainan) (2011)
- Golf World Magazine – “World Top 100” (Lava Fields Course, Mission Hills Hainan) (2011)
- GOLF INC – #8 Asia's Most Powerful Person in Golf
