= Saudi Red Sea Authority =

Saudi Government authority

Saudi Red Sea Authority الهيئة السعودية للبحر الأحمر
- Formation: 30 November 2021; 4 years ago
- Type: authority
- Location: Riyadh, Saudi Arabia
- Region served: Saudi Arabia
- Leader: Mohammed Al- Nasser
- Parent organization: Ministry of Tourism (Saudi Arabia)
- Website: Saudi Red Sea Authority

Saudi Red Sea Authority (SRSA) was established by a Council of Ministers’ decision November 30, 2021, as an enabler and regulator of marine and navigational tourism activities within the geographical scope of Saudi Arabia's Red Sea. It is the primary government body responsible for development of the Red Sea Destination, a Vision 2030 plan to diversity the Saudi economy away from petroleum exploitation.

== Mandate and regulatory role ==
The Saudi Red Sea Authority is responsible for regulating and enabling coastal and marine tourism activities within the geographical scope of Saudi Arabia's Red Sea. Its work includes issuing licenses and permits, developing policies and strategies, identifying infrastructure requirements, supporting investment, preserving the marine environment, and promoting navigational and marine tourism activities.

A central part of the authority's role is the development of regulatory frameworks for maritime and coastal tourism activities. In 2023, the authority issued seven regulations covering private visiting yachts, large yacht chartering, cruise ships, marina design and operation, maritime tourism agents, marine tour operators, and the classification of marine tourism watercraft. These regulations set requirements for licensing, operational procedures, safety, environmental protection, and the responsibilities of operators and service providers working within the Red Sea coastal tourism sector.

The authority's licensing activities also include permits for tourist marinas and other coastal tourism operators. In 2024, the authority announced the issuance of its first three licenses to tourist marina operators, including Al-Ahlam Marina in Jeddah, Al-Ahlam Marina in Jazan, and Red Sea Marina in Jeddah. These licenses were issued as part of the authority's regulatory functions for coastal tourism activities and service providers.

The Saudi Red Sea Authority has also reported coordination with government entities and private sector participants to support planning and implementation in the sector. In 2023, the authority said that its work included approving and implementing a coastal tourism strategy, issuing regulations for navigational tourism activities, signing memoranda of understanding with public and private sector entities, and collaborating with government bodies on a geographical navigation map of the Saudi Red Sea.

These activities are connected to the authority's wider regulatory functions, including the identification of navigational routes, the development of service standards, support for investors, and the protection of the marine environment in areas where coastal and marine tourism activities take place.

== Board of Directors ==
1. Minister of Sports
2. Minister of Culture
3. Undersecretary of the Ministry of Interior
4. A representative from the Ministry of Interior (General Directorate of Border Guards)
5. A representative from the Ministry of Environment, Water and Agriculture
6. A representative from the Ministry of Tourism
7. A representative from the Ministry of Municipal and Rural Affairs and Housing
8. A representative from the Saudi Ports Authority
9. A representative from the Transport General Authority
10. A representative from the Saudi Tourism Authority
11. A representative from the Public Investment Fund
12. Mayor of Jeddah Governorate
13. CEO of NEOM
14. CEO of Red Sea Global
15. President of the Water Sports Association
16. Specialists and experts, no less than (three) and no more than (five) in fields related to the Authority's work

== SRSA mandates ==
- Developing policies, strategies, plans, programs, and initiatives.
- Issuing the necessary licenses and permits for operating navigational and marine tourism activities.
- Identifying areas, routes, and navigational maps for the conduct of navigational and marine tourism activities, in coordination with relevant entities.
- Identifying infrastructure requirements in cooperation with the relevant entities.
- Putting in place a mechanism to protect of the maritime environment in areas where navigation and marine tourism activities take place.
- Implementing measures to incentivize and attract investment in navigational and marine tourism activities, in collaboration with relevant entities.
- Promoting navigational and marine tourism activities to attract practitioners.
- Developing a technical system that includes databases and information relevant to Saudi Red Sea Authority's activities.
- Enhancing human capability by providing access to national training programs in fields relating to the Saudi Red Sea Authority's objectives and responsibilities.

== SRSA regulation ==
Regulation Name	Purpose of Regulation	Activity/Stream	Regulation Details
Private Visiting Yachts.	This regulation aims to regulate the entry and exit of private foreign yachts visiting the Saudi territorial waters on the Red Sea coast.	Yachting & Motorized.	Visiting Private Yacht Regulation
Large Yachts Chartering Regulation.	This regulation aims to allow large yachts carrying foreign flags to be chartered in Saudi territorial waters on the Red Sea coast through the chartering permit system.	Yachting & Motorized.	Large Yacht Chartering Regulation
Cruise Ships Regulation.	Define the terms, conditions and procedures that regulate the activity and business of cruise ships in the geographical location that falls within the jurisdiction of the Kingdom of Saudi Arabia. It also aims to present the requirements necessary for the operator to practice the profession within the geographical scope and presenting the obligations and rights of each relevant party in the operation of cruise ships, taking into account safety, security, health, and environmental procedures.	Cruising.	Cruise Ships Regulation
Marinas Design and Operation Regulation.	This regulation aims to establish the terms, conditions and procedures regulating the activity and business of marina operators and the design of the tourist marinas within the geographical scope. It includes setting requirements for the operations of tourist marinas and present the main health, safety, and environmental, protection considerations required of the marina operator to obtain the operating license.	Yachting & Motorized.	Visiting Private Yacht Regulation
Maritime Tourism Agents Regulation.	These requirements serve to present the required considerations from the maritime tourism agent and these conditions must be used in obtaining the operating license.	Yachting & Motorized.	Maritime Tourism Agent Regulation
Marine Tour Operator Regulation.	This regulation aims to establish the terms, conditions and procedures that regulate the activity and work of tour operators within the geographical scope.	Yachting, Cruising, Motorized, infrastructure and other activities.	Marine Tour Operator Regulation
Marine Tourism Watercraft Classification Regulation.	This Regulation aims to classify the marine tourism watercraft used in coastal tourism, in which related Regulations will be issued by the Authority that enables the practice of maritime and marine activities within the Geographical Scope.	Yachting, Cruising & Motorized	Marine Tourism Watercraft Classification Regulation

== SRSA Achievements ==
=== 2023 ===
- Approving and implementing the first strategy for coastal tourism in Saudi Arabia, which include: 6 primary objectives and 24 KPIs.
- 7 regulations have been issued for navigational tourism activities.
- 16 MoUs signed with public and private sectors both locally and internationally.
- 19 government entities have been collaborated with to create the first geographical navigation map of the Red Sea in Saudi Arabia.
- 30 entities from the public and private sectors have been collaborated with to lead national initiatives through 7 subcommittees.
- Working with entities within the environmental ecosystem to oversea environmental protection.
- Participation in various local and international conferences and exhibitions.
- 14 on-ground inspections completed in line with current regulations to facilitate license issuance.

== See also ==
- Ministry of Tourism
- The Red Sea Destination
- Tourism in Saudi Arabia
- Saudi Ports Authority
