= Tabuk Province =

Province of Saudi Arabia

Tabuk Province منطقة تبوك
- Province
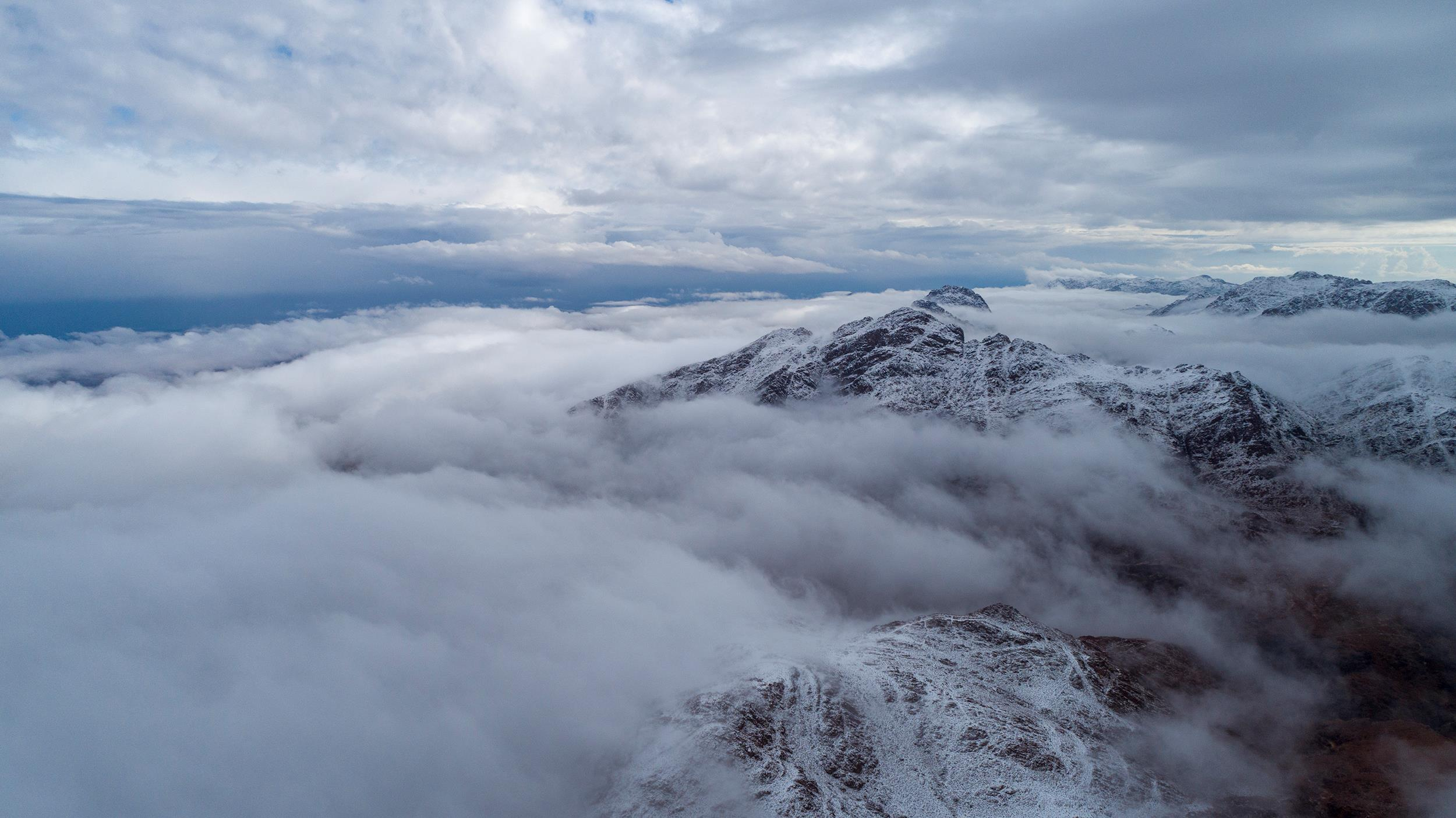
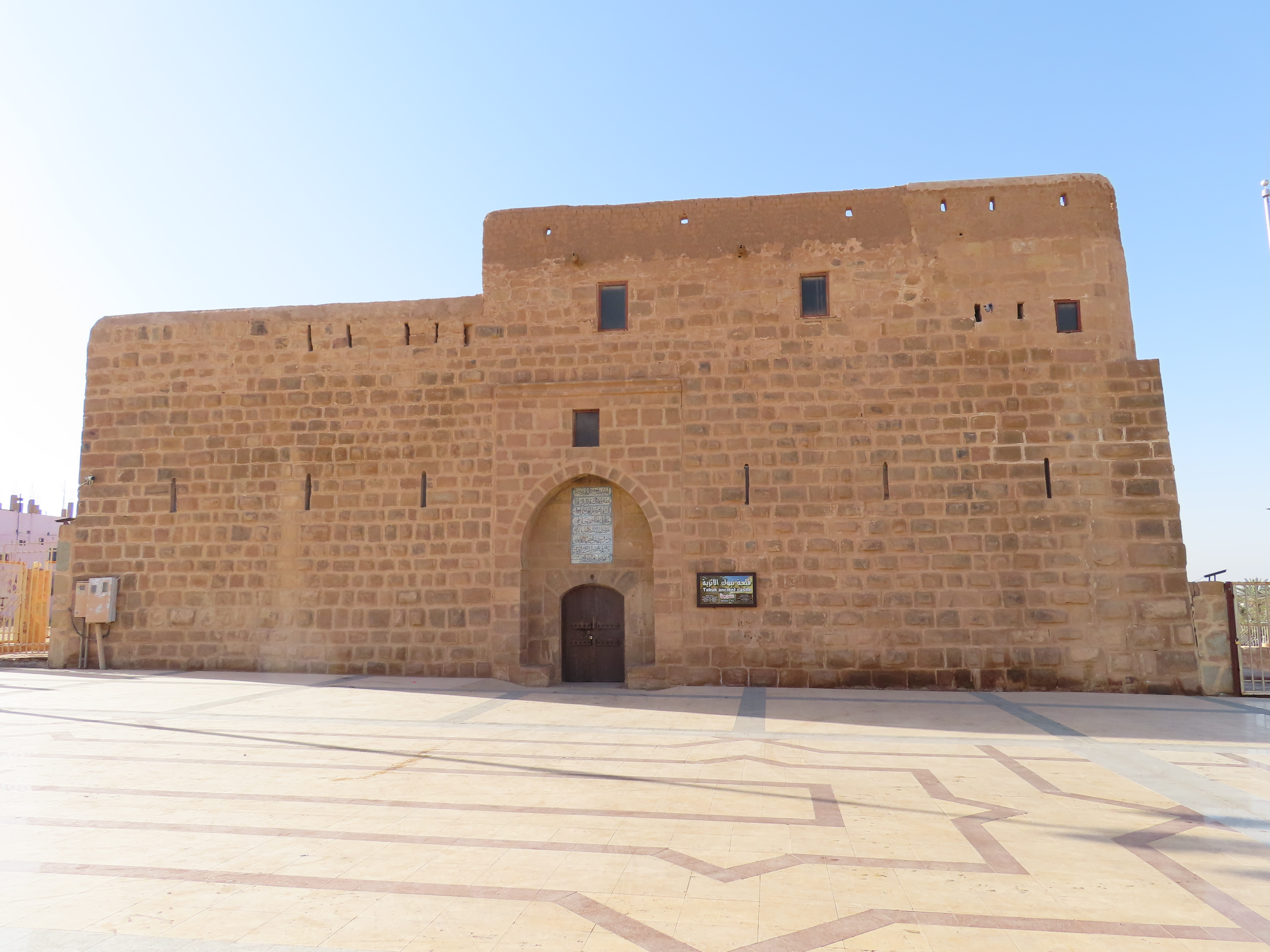
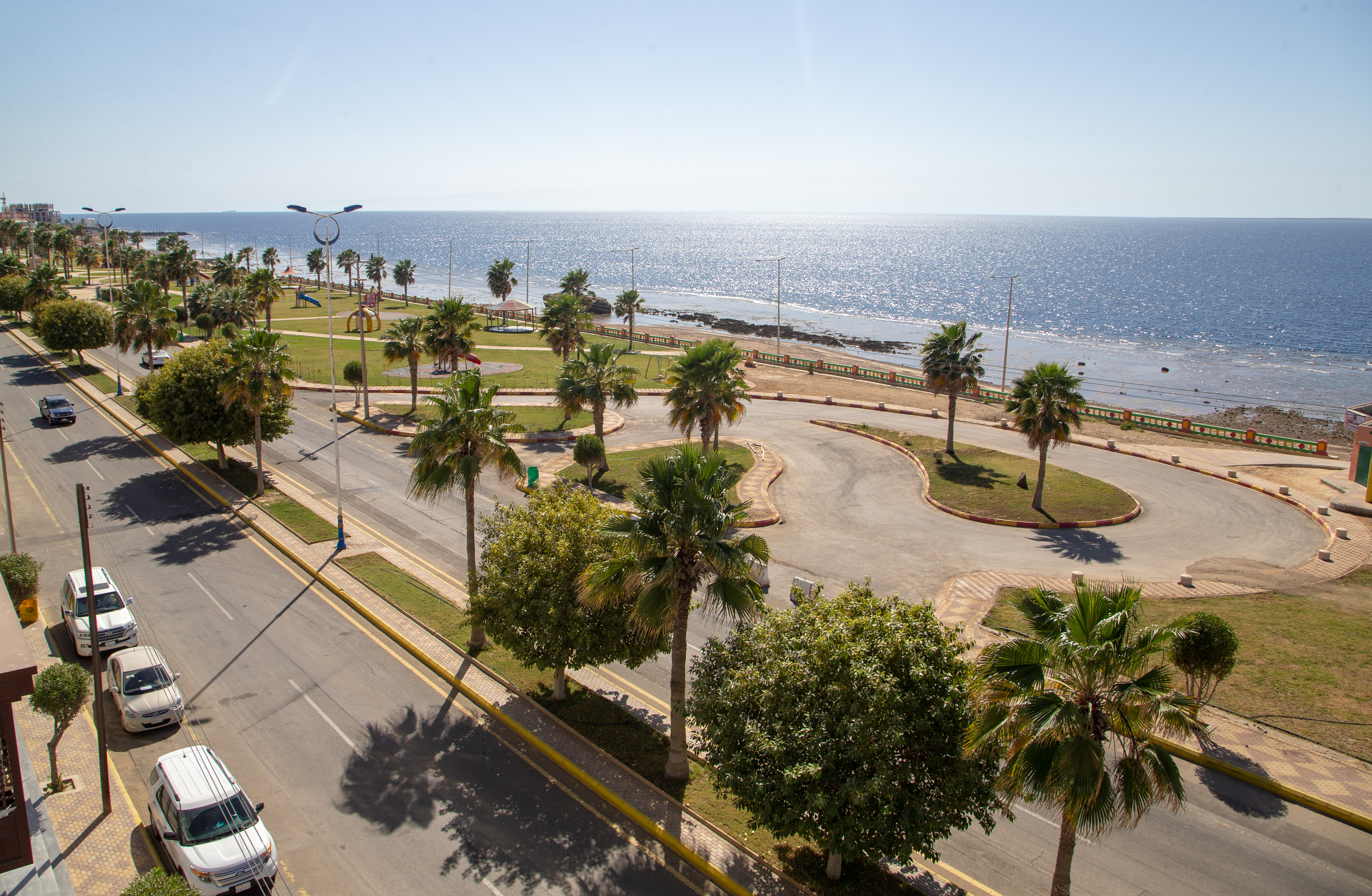
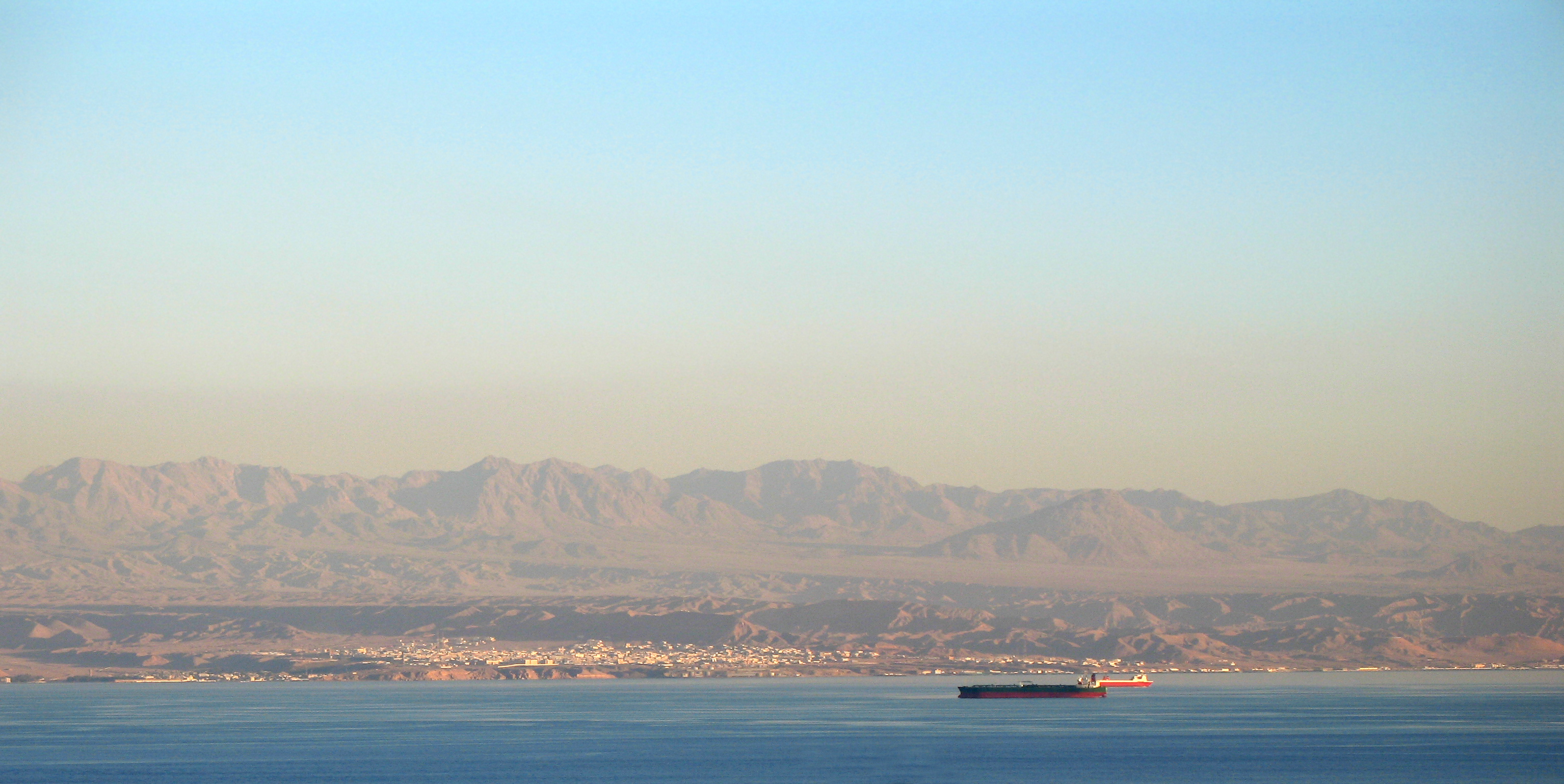
- Snow covering Mount Jabal al-Lawz Tabuk Castle Al-Wajh Beach Haql

- Seal

- Map of Saudi Arabia with Tabuk highlighted
- Coordinates: 28°0′N 37°0′E
- Country: Saudi Arabia
- Region: Hejaz
- Seat: Tabuk City
- Governorates: 6

Government
  - Type: Municipality
  - Body: Tabuk Municipality
  - Governor: Fahd bin Sultan
  - Deputy Governor: Khalid bin Saud

Area
  - Total: 146,072 km^{2} (56,399 sq mi)
- Highest elevation (Mount Jabal al-Lawz): 2,556 m (8,386 ft)

Population (2022 census)
  - Total: 886,036
  - Density: 6.06575/km^{2} (15.7102/sq mi)
- Time zone: UTC+03:00 (SAST)
- ISO 3166-2: SA–07
- Area code: 014
- Website: tabukm.gov.sa

Tabuk Province (Note: also known as the Tabuk Region (Arabic: منطقة تبوك, romanized: Minṭaqat Tabūk)) is a province in Saudi Arabia, located along the northwestern coast of the country on the Red Sea. It borders Jordan to the north and is part of the Hejaz region.

== History ==
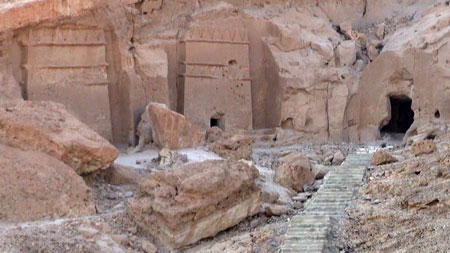
Ancient temples in what used to be Midian, nowadays the province of Tabuk

The history of Tabuk province dates back to 3,000 B.C.E. The province is identified with the land of Midian. The province is traversed by the Hejaz railway, which was built during the Ottoman Empire under the Sultan Abdul Hamid II and was a focus for attacks during the Arab Revolt of 1916–1918. The province has traditionally been inhabited by the Huwaytat tribe.

In recent years, the province has received substantial media attention due to the Saudi government's planned Neom City project in the province.

== Population ==
Historical population
Year	Pop.	±% p.a.
1992	486,134	—
2004	691,716	+2.98%
2010	796,425	+2.38%
2018	930,507	+1.96%
2022	886,036	−1.22%

== Governorates ==
Map of Tabuk Province

Tabuk Province comprises six governorates, with Tabuk City serving as the seat of the province. The governorates are categorized into Category A and Category B based on the availability of services.

Seat
Governorate (A)
Governorate (B)

#	Governorate	2010 Census	2022 Census
–	Tabuk City	571,717	623,665
1	Umluj	61,670	69,656
2	Al-Wajh	44,811	49,948
3	Duba	53,162	54,917
4	Tayma	36,666	42,164
5	Haql	28,399	27,712
6	Al-Bad'	18,673	17,973

== Economy ==
Tabuk is an active commercial center, serving pilgrims passing through towards Mecca. Due to its moderate climate, it's also the site of several dairy and poultry farms. The region (Astra) exports flowers to Europe, mainly lilies, statices and gladiolas. In the past, a narrow-gauge railway (1,050 mm / 3 ft 511/32 in track gauge) ran from Damascus to Medina through Tabuk. Remains of the railway can be found in Tabuk, where a large station was built. The station has since been restored.

== Education ==
Tabuk has a range of educational institutions, including elementary, intermediate, and secondary schools operated by the Ministry of Education throughout the province. Higher education is available for both men and women through several institutions, including the University of Tabuk, Fahd bin Sultan University, and a branch of the Saudi Electronic University.

Technical and vocational education in the region is managed by the Technical and Vocational Training Corporation (TVTC). Colleges for male students include Umluj Technical College, Tabuk Technical College, Haql Technical College, Al-Wajh Technical College, and branches in Tayma and Duba. For female students, the Technical College for Girls in Tabuk offers vocational training.

== Transportation ==
=== Air ===
Tabuk Province is served by several airports that provide domestic and international air links:

- Prince Sultan bin Abdulaziz Airport in Tabuk City serves as the main airport of the province. It handles both civilian and military operations and offers regular domestic flights along with limited international services. The airport has seen a 25% increase in flight operations, reflecting the region’s growth and alignment with Saudi Arabia’s Vision 2030 transportation goals.
- Red Sea International Airport in Hanak on the Red Sea coast began operations in 2023. It serves as a key gateway for Red Sea Global projects, including The Red Sea Destination and Amaala, and is expected to handle up to one million passengers annually by 2030.
- Neom Bay Airport near Sharma began limited operations in 2019 and currently serves as the initial air hub for the Neom development.
- Al-Wajh Domestic Airport serves Al-Wajh and Umluj Governorates, providing regional air connectivity.

=== Border Crossings ===
Tabuk Province shares two international land border crossings with Jordan, supporting both regional trade and religious tourism.

The Durra Border Crossing connects Haql in Tabuk Province to Aqaba in Jordan. Established in 1966 and upgraded in 1988, it facilitates pedestrian and vehicular movement and offers full immigration and visa services.

The Halat Ammar Border Crossing is located near the town of Halat Ammar, southwest of Tabuk city. It serves as a key point of entry for pilgrims traveling to Mecca for Hajj and Umrah. It is operated by the Zakat, Tax and Customs Authority. In recent years, it has been upgraded as part of Saudi Vision 2030 to enhance logistical infrastructure.

== Provincial government ==
The province is governed by a governor (Emir) appointed by the King of Saudi Arabia, assisted by a deputy governor.

Governor	Term of Office	Monarch(s)
Office established
Mohammad bin Abdulaziz	1926 – 1930	Abdulaziz
Abdullah bin Saad Al-Qunb	1930 – 1931	Abdulaziz
Abdullah bin Saad Al-Sudairi	1931 – 1935	Abdulaziz
Saud bin Hathloul	1936 – 1937	Abdulaziz
Musaed bin Abdullah	1938 – 1950	Abdulaziz
Suleiman bin Mohammed	1950	Abdulaziz
Abdulrahman bin Mohammed	1950 – 1953	Abdulaziz
Khalid bin Ahmed	1953 – 1955	Saud
Musaad bin Ahmed	1955 – 1972	Saud, Faisal
Sulaiman bin Turki	1972 – 1980	Faisal, Khalid
Abdul Majeed bin Abdulaziz	1980 – 1986	Khalid, Fahd
Mamdouh bin Abdulaziz	1986 – 1987	Fahd
Fahd bin Sultan	1987 – present	Fahd, Abdullah, Salman

== Destinations ==
- Tabuk Castle.
- The Red Sea Destination
- Amaala
- Sheybarah Island
- Sindalah
- Trojena
- Neom
- Midian
- Al-Naslaa Rock
- The Birds Garden
- The Park of Prince Fahd bin Sultan

== See also ==
- Provinces of Saudi Arabia
- List of governorates of Saudi Arabia
- List of cities and towns in Saudi Arabia
- List of islands of Saudi Arabia
