= Umluj =

Governorate in Tabuk Province, Saudi Arabia

Umluj Governorate محافظة أملج
- Governorate
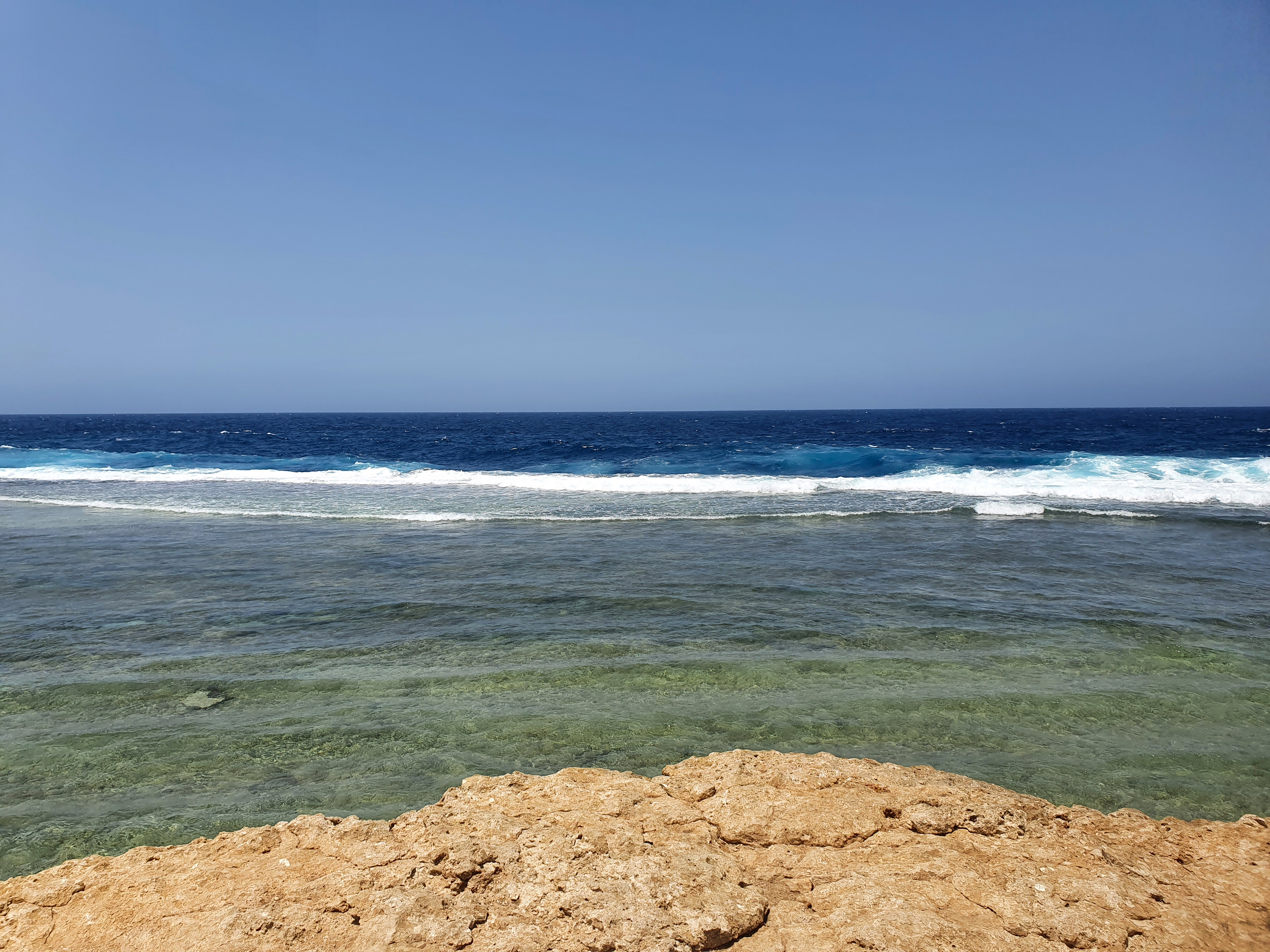
- Umluj Red Sea

- Location of Umluj within Tabuk Province

- Location of Umluj within Saudi Arabia
- Country: Saudi Arabia
- Province: Tabuk Province
- Region: Hejaz
- Seat: Umluj City

Government
  - Type: Municipality
  - Body: Umluj Municipality

Area
  - Governorate: 16,000 km^{2} (6,200 sq mi)

Population (2022)
  - Metro: 69,656
- Time zone: UTC+03:00 (SAST)
- Area code: 014

Umluj (Arabic: أملج) is a governorate in the Tabuk Province of Saudi Arabia. Its administrative seat is the city of Umluj.

== Population ==
Historical population
Year	Pop.	±% p.a.
2016	61,162	—
2022	69,656	+2.19%

== Transportation ==
=== Air ===
Although Umluj does not have its own airport, the governorate is served by the nearby Al-Wajh Domestic Airport, located in the neighboring Al-Wajh Governorate. It offers flights to several major destinations within Saudi Arabia, including Jeddah, Riyadh, and Medina.

== See also ==
- Provinces of Saudi Arabia
- List of islands of Saudi Arabia
- List of governorates of Saudi Arabia
- List of cities and towns in Saudi Arabia
