= Amaala =

Upcoming tourist destination in Saudi Arabia

Amaala أمالا (Arabic)
- Tourism destination

- Location within Saudi Arabia
- Coordinates: 26°38′37″N 36°13′33″E
- Country: Saudi Arabia
- Province: Tabuk
- Body of water: Red Sea
- Announced: 30 September 2018; 8 years ago

Area
  - Total: 4,200 km^{2} (1,600 sq mi)
- Elevation: 0 m (0 ft)
- Time zone: UTC+03 (Arabian Standard Time)
- Developer: Red Sea Global
- Website: www.amaala.com

Amaala (stylized AMAALA; Arabic: أمالا) is a tourism megaproject under construction in Saudi Arabia. The project, which is developed by Public Investment Fund-owned Red Sea Global, forms part of the Saudi Vision 2030 program. The project consists of three main developments: The Coastal Development, Amaala Island, and Triple Bay.

The project is under the patronage of Prince Mohammed bin Salman and is managed by the Public Investment Fund. Amaala is planned to span over 4,200 square kilometers.

In November 2025, Red Sea Global announced the opening of Amaala Triple Bay, with the destination set to open to visitors in the coming months. The initial launch was announced as including six luxury resorts, a yacht club, the Corallium marine life institute, Triple Bay Marina and Marina Village.

== History ==
Announced in 2018 as a "gigaproject" in service of Saudi Arabia's Saudi Vision 2030 projects, Amaala was developed by Red Sea Global, the same company that is responsible for the ongoing development of The Red Sea Destination. Compared to the latter, it was envisioned to focus more on wellness and health tourism. Upon completion, the project was planned to feature 25 hotels with 3,000 rooms as well as 200 retail establishments, fine dining, wellness, and recreational facilities. Amaala will run entirely on renewable energy.

In February 2023, Red Sea Global announced the first hotel in Amaala, the 65-key Clinique La Prairie Health Resort, slated for opening in mid-2024.

In March 2023, the 153-key Jayasom Wellness Resort was announced, with a planned opening year of 2025. Later in the same month, the 110-key Rosewood Amaala was announced, with design provided by ACPV Architects. Both properties will feature branded residences.

In June 2023, the 100-key, plus 25-residence, Six Senses Amaala was announced. Originally planned for a 2025 opening, the resort was designed by U+A, while Studio Carter will design the interiors. The resort opened in July 2026 with a unique dedicated sound dome built for sound-healing sessions. Rooms are a minimum of 102 metres square, ranging up to four bedrooms.

In July 2023, Equinox Hotels announced the 128-key Equinox Resort Amaala, designed by Foster and Partners.

In October 2023, Red Sea Global announced a partnership with Monaco Marina Management to create a yacht club that will serve as the centerpiece of Amaala. Designed by HKS, it will be built on a 10-hectare basin and contain 120 berths.

In March 2024, the Four Seasons Resort and Residences Amaala at Triple Bay was announced. Designed by U+A and slated to be opened in 2025, it will feature 220 keys and 26 branded residences.

In April 2025, Amaala unveiled Nammos Resort Amaala in Triple Bay, making it the only Nammos Hotels & Resorts' hotel outside of Greece. The hotel is designed by Foster and Partners and will feature 110 keys and 20 branded residences.

== See also ==
- List of Saudi Vision 2030 Projects
- The Red Sea Project
