= Al-Wajh =

Governorate in Tabuk Province, Saudi Arabia

Al-Wajh Governorate محافظة الوجه
- Governorate
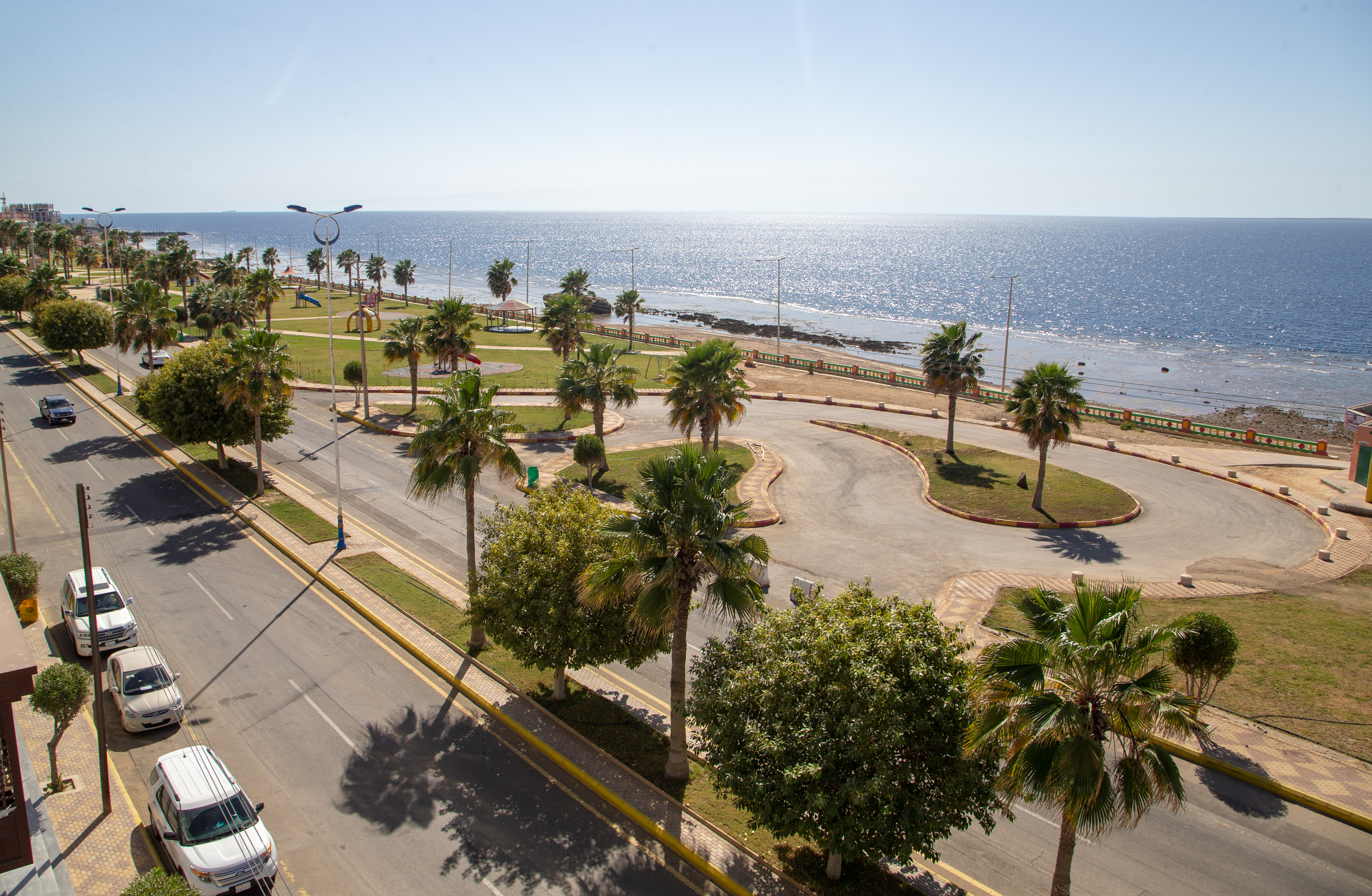
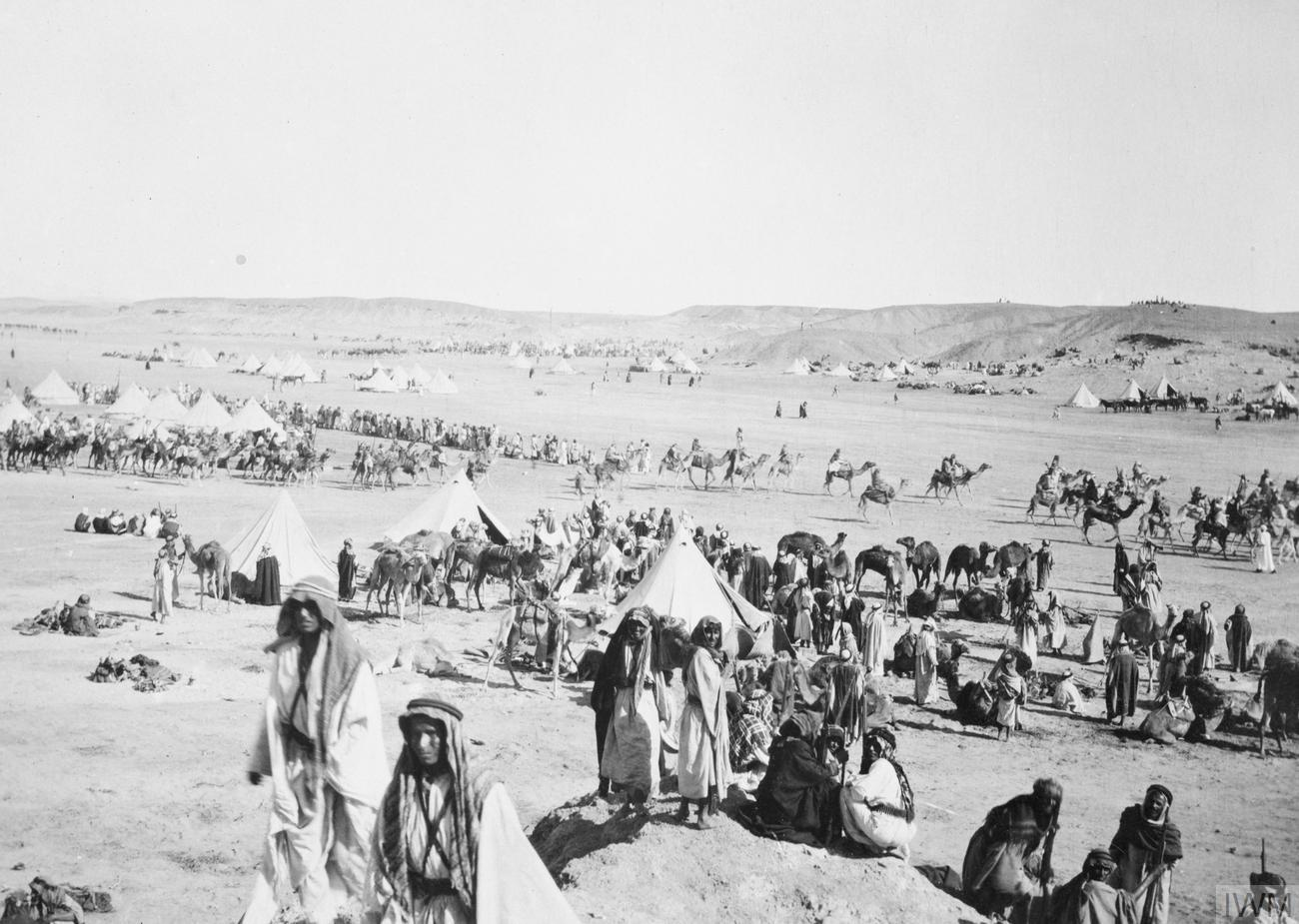
- Beach promenade in Al-Wajh (top) and Al-Wajh during World War I (bottom)

- Map Showing the Governorate’s Location within Tabuk Province

- Location within Saudi Arabia
- Coordinates: 26°17′0″N 36°25′0″E
- Country: Saudi Arabia
- Province: Tabuk Province
- Region: Hejaz
- Seat: Al-Wajh City

Government
  - Type: Municipality
  - Body: Al-Wajh Municipality

Population (2022)
  - Metro: 49,948
- Time zone: UTC+03:00 (SAST)
- Area code: 014

Al-Wajh (Arabic: الوجه) is a coastal governorate in northwestern Saudi Arabia, located on the Red Sea in Tabuk Province. Its seat is Al-Wajh City.

== History ==
Al-Wajh played a pivotal role during the Arab Revolt in World War I. In 1917, the city was taken by the forces of Faisal I, and it was subsequently used as a strategic base for launching a series of coordinated attacks on the Hejaz railway. (See HMS Anne for the British side of that operation.)

Historically, the city has been known by several other names, including Al-Hijr Port, Hegra, Al-Yaqoubi, and Al-Udhri.

== Population ==
Historical population
Year	Pop.	±% p.a.
2013	50,000	—
2022	49,948	−0.01%

== Transportation ==
=== Air ===
The governorate is served by the Al-Wajh Domestic Airport, a small airport located on its outskirts. It offers flights to several major destinations within Saudi Arabia, including Jeddah, Riyadh, and Medina.

== In Art and Literature ==
Al-Wajh is the subject of a painting by Clarkson Frederick Stanfield, an engraving of which was published in Fisher's Drawing Room Scrap Book, 1832 as El Wuish, Red Sea. along with a poetical illustration by Letitia Elizabeth Landon that reflects on the slowness of navigation amongst the numerous coral reefs in the area.

== Climate ==
Climate data for Al-Wajh Domestic Airport (1991–2020)
Month	Jan	Feb	Mar	Apr	May	Jun	Jul	Aug	Sep	Oct	Nov	Dec	Year
Record high °C (°F)	34.2 (93.6)	36.0 (96.8)	38.4 (101.1)	41.8 (107.2)	48.0 (118.4)	46.0 (114.8)	46.0 (114.8)	45.5 (113.9)	45.2 (113.4)	43.0 (109.4)	40.0 (104.0)	37.0 (98.6)	48.0 (118.4)
Mean daily maximum °C (°F)	24.7 (76.5)	25.5 (77.9)	27.4 (81.3)	29.8 (85.6)	32.3 (90.1)	33.4 (92.1)	34.5 (94.1)	34.7 (94.5)	33.7 (92.7)	32.6 (90.7)	30.1 (86.2)	26.7 (80.1)	30.5 (86.9)
Daily mean °C (°F)	19.4 (66.9)	20.2 (68.4)	22.2 (72.0)	24.9 (76.8)	27.6 (81.7)	29.0 (84.2)	30.3 (86.5)	30.6 (87.1)	29.3 (84.7)	27.8 (82.0)	24.6 (76.3)	21.2 (70.2)	25.6 (78.1)
Mean daily minimum °C (°F)	13.9 (57.0)	14.7 (58.5)	16.8 (62.2)	19.7 (67.5)	22.8 (73.0)	24.1 (75.4)	25.6 (78.1)	26.2 (79.2)	24.7 (76.5)	22.8 (73.0)	19.2 (66.6)	15.9 (60.6)	20.5 (68.9)
Record low °C (°F)	5.1 (41.2)	6.1 (43.0)	9.5 (49.1)	12.0 (53.6)	16.4 (61.5)	19.2 (66.6)	21.4 (70.5)	22.0 (71.6)	19.0 (66.2)	15.5 (59.9)	12.4 (54.3)	9.2 (48.6)	5.1 (41.2)
Average precipitation mm (inches)	11.0 (0.43)	3.8 (0.15)	1.4 (0.06)	0.5 (0.02)	0.5 (0.02)	0.0 (0.0)	0.0 (0.0)	0.0 (0.0)	0.1 (0.00)	0.9 (0.04)	10.1 (0.40)	8.2 (0.32)	36.4 (1.43)
Average precipitation days (≥ 1.0 mm)	1.5	0.6	0.4	0.1	0.1	0.0	0.0	0.0	0.0	0.1	0.5	0.8	4.1
Average relative humidity (%)	57	58	58	60	67	73	74	74	75	67	59	57	65
Mean monthly sunshine hours	260	249	288	294	313	345	357	347	294	295	258	239	3,539
Mean daily sunshine hours	8.4	8.8	9.3	9.8	10.1	11.5	11.5	11.2	9.8	9.5	8.6	7.7	9.7
Source 1: NOAA
Source 2: Deutscher Wetterdienst (humidity 1970–1979, sun 1986-1990)

== See also ==
- Provinces of Saudi Arabia
- List of islands of Saudi Arabia
- List of governorates of Saudi Arabia
- List of cities and towns in Saudi Arabia
