= Linear city =

Linear city may refer to:

- Linear settlement
- Linear city (Soria design), an 1882 concept of city planning
- Linear city (Graves and Eisenman design), a 1965 proposal for a settlement in New Jersey
- The linear city model of Hotelling's law

== See also ==
- The Line, Saudi Arabia
