= The Line, Saudi Arabia =

Project to construct a linear smart city in Tabuk, Saudi Arabia

The Line ذا لاين (Arabic)
- City: Arcology; Linear settlement; Smart city
- Official logo in Arabic and English
- Coordinates: 28°06′00″N 35°18′00″E
- Country: Saudi Arabia
- Province: Tabuk
- City: Neom
- Announced: 10 January 2021; 5 years ago
- Founder: Mohammed bin Salman

Government
  - Director: Nadhmi Al-Nasr (2018–2024); Aiman Al-Mudaifer (2024–)

Area
  - Total: 34 km^{2} (13 sq mi)

Dimensions
  - Length: 170 km (110 mi)
  - Width: 0.2 km (0.12 mi)

Population
  - Total: 0 (Note: The proposed population is 9,000,000 residents.)
- Time zone: UTC+03 (Arabian Standard Time)
- Website: www.neom.com/ar-sa/regions/theline

The Line (Arabic: ذا لاين) is a planned linear settlement in Neom, Tabuk Province, Saudi Arabia, to be housed entirely in a single very long arcology. Announced in 2021, it was envisioned as a smart city with no cars, streets or carbon emissions. The project was conceived by Saudi ruler Mohammed bin Salman, the leader of the project. By 2025, the megaproject had been substantially scaled down or suspended.

The initial plan, announced in 2021, called for the city to span 170 kilometres (110 mi) at a height of 500 m (1,600 ft) and a width of 200 metres (660 ft), with the capacity to accommodate a population of 9 million (25% of Saudi Arabia's 2022 population of 35.5 million). The Line was planned to have an entirely glass mirror exterior, with all basic services within a five-minute walking distance. The city is one of the five announced regions of Neom and was a part of the Saudi Vision 2030 project. From the start, the Line has been criticised for unrealistic costs and timelines, an impractical shape, environmental harm, and human rights violations. Thousands of people have been forcibly moved to make way for the project and villages have been razed. In 2025, the Wall Street Journal reported on an internal audit of the megaproject which found extensive problems, including "evidence of deliberate manipulation", by the managers of the project.

Saudi Arabia stated that it aimed to complete a 5 km (3.1 mi) segment by 2030, with completion of the full 170 km (110 mi) project in 2045. In 2024, the Wall Street Journal and Bloomberg reported that the first phase would only be 2.4 km (1.5 mi) long; Saudi officials denied this and stated that the project was continuing as planned. After $50 billion had been spent, the project was reported to be facing problems including large cost increases and delays. The aim had become to complete the first half-mile section in 2034. The Wall Street Journal said that a 2023 draft board presentation estimated completion in 2080 at a cost of $8.8 trillion—25 times the annual Saudi budget—and $370 billion by 2035 for the first phase, mostly funded by the Saudi state, with the hope of later private investment.

By the end of 2025, the project appeared to have been suspended and no construction work was taking place. International media described The Line as a "likely failure". In May 2026, Semafor reported that Saudi Arabia had delayed the construction of The Line until at least after 2030.

== Proposal ==
Artist's conception of the outdoor interior space within The Line

The Line was planned to extend 170 kilometres (110 miles) from near the Red Sea to the city of Tabuk, and to accommodate up to nine million residents, with a projected average population density of 260,000 per square kilometre (670,000/sq mi). This was six times that of Manila, the world's most densely populated city in 2020 (44,000 per square kilometre (110,000/sq mi)), and over a fifth of that of the Kowloon Walled City (1.2 million per square kilometre (3 million/sq mi)). The Line's design consisted of two mirrored buildings with an outdoor space in between, having a total width of 200 metres (660 ft) and a height of 500 metres (1,600 ft). This would have made it the third-tallest building in the country after the Abraj Al-Bait Clock Tower and the Jeddah Tower, and approximately the 12th-tallest building in the world.

The city was to be powered entirely by renewable energy. It would have consisted of three layers: one on the surface for pedestrians, one underground for infrastructure, and another underground for transportation. Artificial intelligence would have monitored the city and used predictive and data models to find ways to improve daily life for its citizens, with residents being paid for submitting data to The Line.

The estimated construction cost was US$100–200 billion (400–700 billion SAR), with some estimates as high as $1 trillion. It was claimed by the Saudi government that it would have created 460,000 jobs, spurred economic diversification, and contributed 180 billion SAR (US$48 billion) to domestic GDP by 2030. According to Crown Prince Mohammed bin Salman in 2022, the first phase project was expected to cost SAR 1.2 trillion (US$320 billion), with the Saudi sovereign wealth fund Public Investment Fund (PIF) providing half of the sum.

=== Feasibility ===
According to architect and urban planner Etienne Bou-Abdo, "the 3D images presented were not classical 3D architecture images", and the designers of the project "have rather called upon video game designers". Bou-Abdo stated that the plan included "a lot of technology that we don't have today". Many of the project's key announcements, particularly in the areas of energy and transportation, were based on technologies that did not exist even in prototype form.

=== Reported scaling back ===
In April 2024, it was reported that the project had been "scaled back." According to Torbjorn Soltvedt, principal analyst at risk consultancy firm Maplecroft, foreign investors had shown limited interest in the crown prince's vision for the project. Fluctuating global oil prices had contributed to the decision.

The Saudi Minister of Economy and Planning, Faisal F. Alibrahim, disputed reports of scaling back. He said in an interview during a World Economic Forum special meeting in Riyadh in 2024 that "For NEOM, the projects, the intended scale is continuing as planned. There is no change in scale". As of October 2024, Saudi Arabia intended to complete a 5 km (3.1 mi) central segment of The Line by 2030. Completion of the full 170 km (110 mi) project was rescheduled for 2045. According to CNBC, in July 2025, Saudi Arabia’s sovereign wealth fund used consulting firms to conduct a strategic review into the feasibility of The Line as part of “common practice” strategic checks on long-term megaprojects.

The Times reported in August 2025 that Saudi Arabia's sovereign wealth fund had written down $8 billion from major projects, including the Neom development. According to The Times, "many of the projects faced delays and cost overruns and had reportedly been scaled back." The report added that Neom faced "repeated delays" after other infrastructure projects were given priority.

On September 16, 2025, the Saudi sovereign wealth fund PIF suspended work on the construction project until further notice. The PIF is expected to spend $16 billion on the task of cancelling contracts and remediating the effects of shutting down the project.

== Planning ==
The Line concept contained elements of architectural ideas from the industrial era.

- In 1882, the Spanish urban planner Arturo Soria imagined a linear city based on innovative use of the tramway. He applied part of his idea to a neighborhood in Madrid, but lack of support ended the scheme.
- In the 1950s, the French architect Yona Friedman proposed the concept of an integrated, modular and vertical "spatial city" to solve the problem of urban sprawl, but the idea remained an intellectual curiosity.
- In the 1960s, the Italian avant-garde group Superstudio presented a radical artistic project: the continuous monument, "an architectural model for total urbanization", which was supposed to cover the entire Earth but without any feasibility or real utility. The proposal was a criticism of Modernism, monumentality, design and capitalism.

The first plan for The Line was announced on 10 January 2021 by Saudi Crown Prince Mohammed bin Salman in a presentation broadcast on state television. Earthworks began in October 2021 and crews working on the project were to move in during 2024. As of July 2022, the first phase of the project was scheduled to be completed in 2030. Bin Salman, as chairman of the Neom board of directors, released a statement and promotional video on 25 July 2021 which led to more widespread media coverage of the project. This caused questions to be raised about the merits of the design and environmental issues, with critics concerned that the project would create a "dystopian" and "artificial" facility that had already displaced the Huwaitat indigenous tribe and would impact the migration of birds and wildlife.

=== Architects ===
The project management required all architects to sign confidentiality agreements. As a result, no reference to The Line appears on their websites. German newspaper Süddeutsche Zeitung reported that several architects were involved with the project, including David Adjaye, Ben van Berkel (UN Studios), Massimiliano Fuksas, the London office of the late Zaha Hadid, Rem Koolhaas, the Laboratory for Visionary Architecture (LAVA), Delugan Meissl, and Wolf D. Prix from Coop Himmelb(l)au. The Süddeutsche reported on questions raised regarding the sustainability aspects of the project and included commentary on the participation of architects in relation to broader ethical considerations. In November 2024, it was announced that Delugan Meissl Associated Architects and Gensler had been appointed as the architects for phase one of the project.

== Construction ==
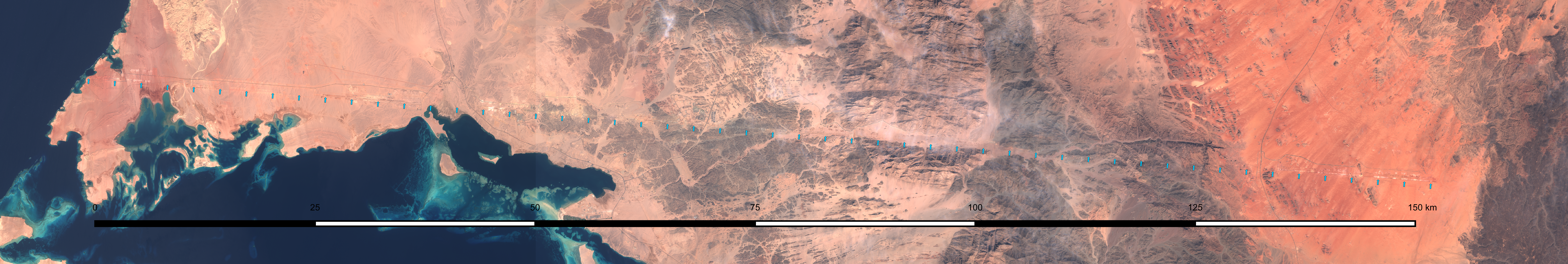
Excavation progress of The Line (marked with blue arrows, 150-kilometre (95-mile) ruler for scale), October 2022

By October 2022, construction was underway, with excavation taking place along the entire length of the project. Saudi Arabia commissioned a SAR 700 million (almost US$190 million) multi-plant concrete factory capable of producing up to 20,000 cubic meters (roughly 700,000 cubic ft) of concrete per day.

=== The Spine ===
Early plans proposed an underground railway with 510-kilometre-per-hour (317 mph) trains that could travel from one end of The Line to the other in 20 minutes. As of 2023, short tunnels had been dug for the start of the railway, while a train was in a prototype stage of development.

In August 2023, Webuild and Shibh Al Jazira Contracting Company (SAJCO) signed a 1.4 billion contract to construct 57 kilometres of a high-speed rail line in Neom. Referred to as the “Connector,” the rail will link Oxagon with The Line.

=== Modules 40–50 ===
By March 2023, more than 4,500 piles had been driven in module 43, reaching a peak of 60 piles per day. Piling work then shifted towards modules 45, 46 and 47, located at The Hidden Marina. Excavation of about 1 million cubic metres (35 million cubic feet) of earth was taking place each week at the marina.

=== The Hidden Marina ===
The design includes a marina, approximately twice the size of existing marinas, on the northern side of the development, away from the sea. Plans call for a tunnel and canal to be constructed through The Line, large enough to accommodate cruise ships to pass through. Construction started in April 2022, with an intended opening to visitors and residents by 2030. By February 2024, over 90 million cubic metres of material had been excavated and moved.

In February 2025, it was announced that construction of the first segment of The Line, the Hidden Marina district, had begun. The development is planned to cover approximately 21 million square metres and involve over 140,000 workers, with around 40% identified as Saudi nationals. It is projected to accommodate more than 200,000 people through a mix of housing, hotel rooms, retail and commercial spaces, as well as supporting community infrastructure, including fire stations and schools.

In May 2025, it was reported that construction progress had reached record levels, including what were described as the world’s largest dewatering and piling operations, as part of one of the largest construction sites globally.

=== NEOM Stadium ===
Saudi Arabia revealed plans for Neom Stadium within The Line in August 2024, as the home for a men’s and women’s professional football club. Following this, in December 2024, it was announced that the Kingdom would host the 2034 FIFA World Cup, of which several matches would have been hosted at Neom Stadium. The project has now been scrapped as of 2026.

=== Dewatering system ===
As part of The Line, the world's largest dewatering system is proposed. A large-scale dewatering system forms part of the construction infrastructure for The Line and is used to support excavation and piling works along the project corridor. Reporting on the project has described the associated dewatering and earthworks operations as among the largest of their kind globally.

== Reception ==
=== Urban planning and environmental concerns ===
In an interview with Dezeen, Marshall Brown of Princeton University said that, while he believed in such large-scale urban planning, it would be difficult to achieve the slick, futuristic aesthetic seen in the concept art for the project because of the large number of factors involved: for example, one of the images depicted a picnic on a 200-metre-high (660 ft) ledge, which would probably have been dangerous in real life. Hélène Chartier of C40 Cities compared The Line to other unrealised linear city projects such as Soria's 1882 design and a 1965 proposal in New Jersey. Dutch architect Winy Maas said that while he would love to live in such an environment, its profile as seen in the concept art was monotonous, and he believed it would facilitate unfavourable wind flow through the interior.

Philip Oldfield of the University of New South Wales said that the quality of life would probably come down to whether the city was well-managed, rather than to its visual flair. Oldfield said the project would have a carbon footprint of about 1.8 gigatonnes (2,000 million short tons) of CO_{2} equivalent in the glass, steel, and concrete, because "you cannot build a 500-metre-tall [1,600 ft] building out of low-carbon materials". He said the 170-kilometre (110-mile) profile would create a large-scale barrier to adjacent ecosystems and migratory species similar to that created by highways, and the mirrored exterior facade would be dangerous for birds.

Researchers from the Vienna Complexity Science Hub suggested that a circle shaped city with the same area as the line, and thus of a 3.3 km (2.1 mi) radius would have had much shorter commuting times than a linear city. The average distance between two inhabitants of a linear city would be 57 km (35 mi), as opposed to 2.9 km (1.8 mi) for a circular city. In a linear city, each inhabitant would have only 1.2% of the population in walking distance as "people are as far away from others as possible", as opposed to 24% in a circular city. In a linear city, walking and cycling would not be popular and travel time in a fast train would be disproportionately long, while a compact circular city would allow active mobility and fast trains would not be needed. The required density in a circular city would be much lower, which would allow it to be built with existing technology, reducing the environmental footprint of buildings. A railway line disruption would immobilize a linear city but have less impact on a circular city.

=== Concerns about policy and human rights ===
Digital rights researchers such as Vincent Mosco have suggested that the city's data collection scheme could make it a "surveillance city", because of arrangements that would distort consent to sharing data, and because Saudi Arabia's poor human rights record might imply potential misuse of data. Neom CEO Joseph Bradley said that the Neom coordinators were resolving privacy issues and that Saudi Arabia had a personal data protection law.

Aside from the merits of the projected city, there was also scrutiny of the actions of the Saudi government in pursuing the project. In October 2022, three men of the Howeitat tribe, Shadli, Ibrahim, and Ataullah al-Huwaiti, were sentenced to death when they refused to vacate their village as part of the NEOM project. Shadli al-Huwaiti was the brother of Abdul Rahim al-Huwaiti, who was shot dead by security forces in April 2020 in his home in Al-Khariba, in the part of Tabuk province earmarked for NEOM, after he posted videos on social media opposing the displacement of local residents to make way for the project. In response to reports of human rights violations, one company, Solar Winds, pulled out of the project in 2022.

== See also ==
- Groundscraper
- List of Saudi Vision 2030 projects
- King Abdullah Economic City
- Masdar City
- Megastructure
- Palm Islands
- Prince Abdulaziz Bin Mousaed Economic City
- Saudi–Egypt Causeway – proposed bridge over the Straits of Tiran from Saudi Arabia to Egypt
- Jabal Omar
