= Rabih Alenezi =

Former Saudi Intelligence Officer

Rabih Alenezi (Arabic: رابح العنزي) is a former intelligence officer and Saudi dissident colonel in the Saudi Arabian police force. Known for his vocal criticism of the Saudi Arabian government, particularly Crown Prince Mohammed bin Salman, Alenezi has been living in exile in the United Kingdom. He has made significant contributions to the discourse on human rights in Saudi Arabia, particularly with respect to the Neom project, a planned megacity in the desert. His allegations of human rights violations and his personal experiences have brought international attention to the issue. Despite facing numerous threats, Col. Alenezi continues to speak out against oppression and advocate for human rights. According to Human Rights Watch, hundreds of migrants are said to have been shot dead on the border with Yemen on the orders of MBS. In a ZDF interview (Second German Television), Col. Rabih spoke of an order that has been carried out for three years: In 2020, a killing order came from Mohammed bin Salman himself. The order said to kill anyone who comes near the Saudi border, any person near the border was considered a terrorist to be neutralized immediately. On the British channel itv, Col. Rabih Alenezi appeared in the movie (Kingdom Uncovered: Inside Saudi Arabia) and confirmed that he had received an order to use lethal force against any resistance from the Al-Huwaitat tribe. However, he pretended to be very ill and apologized for carrying out the mission for fear of being involved in human rights violations. Despite this, the mission proceeded and ended with the killing of Abdul Rahim al-Huwaiti, who refused to evacuate his house for the NEOM LINE project. Furthermore, Colonel Rabih appeared in the documentary The Future of Saudi Arabia with Mohammed bin Salman, aired on France 5, which also shed light on certain human rights abuses in Saudi Arabia.

== Early life and career ==
Alenezi studied both his bachelor’s and master’s degrees in the UK. In addition to that, he worked with American police officers and studied security in Phoenix the capital city of Arizona in the United States. He also served as a senior official in Saudi Arabia's security service for two decades. During his tenure, he claims he was ordered to commit human rights abuses.

== Defection and asylum ==
Col. Alenezi defected from Saudi Arabia's General Directorate of Public Security. He requested asylum in the UK after he claimed he had been ordered to commit human rights abuses. He announced his defection and began speaking out online.

== Threats and fears ==
Since his defection, Alenezi has received numerous death threats. He was receiving an average of 50 death threats a week. The Saudi royal court reportedly had a $250,000 (£200,000) bounty on his head. The British police therefore advised him to adopt the lifestyle of Edward Snowden, the former US intelligence operative who is currently hiding in Russia. Alenezi fears for his life and lives in hiding now.

Alenezi, who carries a diplomatic passport, arrived in London in February 2023. He feared he could be killed in the same way as Jamal Khashoggi, a journalist and vocal critic of the Saudi regime who was murdered inside the Saudi embassy in Istanbul in 2018. According to the BBC in 2024, Alenezi is now based in the UK but still fears for his security. He says an intelligence officer told him that he would be offered $5M (£4M) if he attended a meeting at London's Saudi embassy with the Saudi interior minister but he refused.

Manisha Ganguly, an investigative reporter for The Guardian, stated on her account on the X platform that Saudi government agents continue to offer rewards for Alenezi‘s capture, despite the fact that he lives in exile, and she attached a screenshot of a post from a verified account named @whatsayeezy which quoted a post by Alenezi and stated: "First person to geolocate this individual and where he rests his head at night gets $15,000,000 in clean crypto serious offer only" Alenezi also drew attention to this threatening post, whose author is now suspended.

Alenezi, now seeking asylum in the UK after having thus bounty put on his head, said the culture of fear rules under the de facto ruler. He said that the death penalty, often carried out by beheading with a sword or shooting, is a way to “intimidate people and terrorise society because Mohammed bin Salman knows that people hate him”, including ministers.“He does not believe that people will carry out his orders and accept his projects without fear,” he added.

== Activism ==
Col. Alenezi has used his platform to speak out against Prince Mohammed bin Salman. He has gained a high number of followers online and lives on donations from them.

== Involvement in the Neom project ==
Colonel Rabih Alenezi blasted Prince Mohammed's pet project Neom, a planned megacity in the desert, on the US-based Alhurra channel, arguing it is not a national project because the Saudi Crown Prince ignored Saudi residents' concerns.Similar concerns were also raised by United Nations human rights experts, who expressed alarm over alleged forced evictions, the displacement of members of the Huwaitat tribe, and reprisals against those opposing the Neom project. He made numerous allegations of human rights abuses he was asked to carry out, including the Saudi Interior Ministry's order to crack down on the Howeitat tribe in Tabuk province in 2020, planned location of project. He claimed that Saudi authorities authorized the use of lethal force to clear land for the Neom project. Speaking to Dezeen, Alenezi urged companies involved in the project to withdraw from it. "I think Neom firms should pull out of this contentious project immediately lest they be implicated in Saudi Arabian human rights abuses," he said. "I would like to remind architects that housing is an inalienable human right and that it is not rational to demolish entire towns and force their inhabitants to flee in the name of a wild, impractical plan."

== Political Influence of Col. Rabih Alenezi’ Revelations on Neom and UK-Saudi Relations ==
In May 2024, a UK trade mission to Saudi Arabia, led by Deputy Prime Minister Oliver Dowden, was overshadowed by allegations of human rights abuses tied to the Neom project, part of Saudi Arabia’s Vision 2030. The "Great Futures" summit in Riyadh, attended by a 450-person delegation including Business Secretary Kemi Badenoch and Culture Secretary Lucy Frazer, aimed to boost trade, tourism, education, and innovation, focusing on Neom’s £400 billion linear city, "The Line." A BBC investigation, published May 8, 2024, cited former Saudi intelligence officer Colonel Rabih Alenezi, now exiled in the UK, alleging that in April 2020, Saudi authorities ordered lethal force to evict Howeitat tribe members from al-Khuraybah for The Line. Alenezi claimed villager Abdul Rahim al-Huwaiti was killed for resisting eviction, contradicting Saudi claims he fired on forces. ALQST and the UN reported 47 detentions, with 40 still held and five facing death sentences. Human rights groups urged an investigation, with Amnesty International warning businesses of complicity risks and ALQST suggesting UK leverage for detainees’ release. The Trade Justice Movement criticized UK trade talks with the Gulf Cooperation Council.The Prime Minister’s office confirmed Dowden discussed the villagers’ treatment with Saudi officials, balancing economic ties with human rights concerns. Foreign Secretary David Cameron promised to review the claims, while Frazer highlighted Vision 2030 opportunities. Saudi authorities and Neom did not comment.According to the BBC, a source familiar with the operations of the Saudi intelligence directorate confirmed that Colonel Rabih Alenezi’s testimony regarding the communication and content of the clearance order aligned with their knowledge of such missions in general. The source further stated that Alenezi’s senior rank was appropriate for leading such an assignment. This corroboration by a credible and knowledgeable authority likely accounts for the significant international and legal attention his revelations have attracted.

== Case of Colonel Rabih al‑Enezi Highlighted by the U.S. State Department ==
The U.S. Department of State documented the case of Colonel Rabih al‑Enezi in its 2023 Country Report on Human Rights Practices in Saudi Arabia, noting that authorities sought to intimidate critics abroad and abduct dissidents for forced repatriation. Al‑Enezi’s experience was cited as an example of these practices.

In March, Colonel Rabih al‑Enezi, a former Saudi police officer who had openly criticized the country’s leadership and sought asylum in the United Kingdom, reported fearing for his life after a verified X account, allegedly linked to a Jeddah influencer, announced a financial bounty for information on his location. On March 17, his X account was hacked, with his critical posts replaced by images of Crown Prince Mohammed bin Salman Al Saud. The same account also claimed responsibility for calling a UK restaurant to disrupt al‑Enezi while he livestreamed criticism of Saudi Arabia. This incident was documented in the U.S. Department of State’s 2023 Country Report on Human Rights Practices in Saudi Arabia.

== See also ==
- Abdul Rahim al-Huwaiti
