= Sanafir Island =

Island in Saudi Arabia

Native name: Jazīrat Ṣanafir جزيرة صنافر
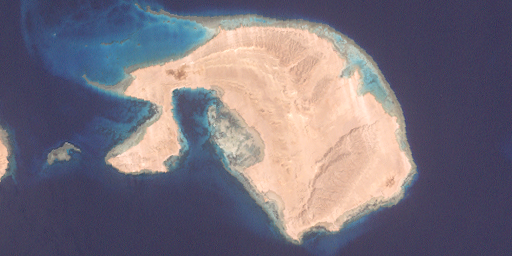
- The island from space
- Interactive map of Sanafir Island

Geography
- Location: Red Sea
- Coordinates: 27°55′48″N 34°42′36″E
- Total islands: 1
- Area: 33 km^{2} (13 sq mi)
- Highest elevation: 49 m (161 ft)

Administration
- Saudi Arabia

Demographics
- Population: Uninhabited

Sanafir Island (Arabic: جزيرة صنافر, romanized: Jazīrat Ṣanafir, pronounced [ɡeˈziːret sˤɑnɑˈfiːɾ]) is a Saudi island in the Red Sea. It was previously administered by Egypt. Its area is about 33 km^{2} (13 sq mi) and it is located at the entrance to the Straits of Tiran, which separates the Gulf of Aqaba from the Red Sea. The island is about 2.5 km from Tiran Island. The island is characterized by floating coral reefs.

== Etymology ==
The name comes from Coptic ⲥⲉⲛⲛⲟⲩϥⲣⲓ Sanufri which itself comes from Egyptian s.t-n-nfr.t, "place of good profit".

== Transfer to Saudi Arabia ==
On 9 April 2016, the Egyptian government declared that Sanafir and Tiran Islands fall within the territorial waters of Saudi Arabia, as codified in the maritime border agreement signed with the government of Saudi Arabia on the previous day. However, the agreement had to be ratified by the Parliament of Egypt.

The proposed deal was quashed by an Egyptian judge, and an Egyptian court gave its final ruling in January 2017, rejecting the deal and affirming Egyptian sovereignty over both islands, supported by much of the Egyptian public. The proposed deal caused turmoil in Egyptian politics and across the country, erupting mass protests that accused President Sisi of "selling" Egyptian land.

On 14 June 2017, Egypt's House Committee on Defence and National Security unanimously approved the transfer of Tiran and Sanafir islands to Saudi Arabia, and the plan was passed by the Egyptian Parliament later the same day. The deal moves forward the idea of building the Saudi–Egypt Causeway.

The island was under Egyptian control in the past but reverted to Saudi Arabian sovereignty on 8 April 2016, after the completion of transfer procedures (Pending). On 17 June 2017, Egyptian President Abdel Fattah el-Sisi ratified the maritime demarcation agreement between the two countries. It was adopted on maps and official documents on 17 August 2017 and approved by the Egyptian House of Representatives on 14 June 2017, which approved the transfer of the island and its neighbor to Saudi Arabia. The United Nations was notified in accordance with the Charter of Article 102 of the provisions of subsidiarity and sovereignty relating to islands and maritime territory.

== History ==
In World War II, the Egyptian forces on Tiran and Sanafir islands were part of the Egyptian troops protecting Suez Canal, according to Egypt's representative at the 659th UN security council meeting on 15 February 1954:

60. A disparaging reference has been made in this Council to Egyptians being on the two islands of Tiran and Sanafir on the Red Sea, islands which had been occupied by Egyptians long before the Israel armed forces advanced to the Gulf of Aqaba a few days after the signature of the Egyptian-Israel General Armistice Agreement. Here I feel bound to state that the records of the Second World War contain official evidence that Egyptian units had been using these two islands as part of the Egyptian defensive system during that war. Egyptian detachments on these two islands co-operated with the Egyptian air force and the naval units entrusted at the time with the task of protecting Allied shipping in the Red Sea against submarine attack. While Egyptian air force units were covering the coast for Allied shipping in the Mediterranean, a force of 8,000 Egyptian troops undertook the defence of the entire length of the Suez Canal and its ports against continuous, hostile air attacks throughout the Second World War.

In the same meeting, Egypt's representative considered Tiran and Sanafir islands an integral part of the territory of Egypt, since they have been under Egypt's administration since 1906:

132. The Israel representative spoke to us of the islands situated at the entrance to the Gulf of Aqaba. He alleged that these islands had been suddenly occupied by Egypt. He read out a declaration of the Egyptian Government transmitted in a letter addressed to the United States Embassy at Cairo. Those islands were not suddenly occupied; they were occupied, may I point out, in 1906. At that time it had been found necessary to delimit the frontiers between Egypt and the Ottoman Empire. With a view to this delimitation, Egypt, for technical reasons, proceeded to occupy the two islands. The occupation was the subject of discussions, exchanges of views and even letters between the Ottoman Empire and the Khedivial Government of Egypt. Consequently, there was no surprise. The islands have in fact been occupied since 1906, and it is an established fact that from that time on they have been under Egyptian administration. 133. While it is true that after relations between Egypt and the Ottoman Empire were broken off these islands became exclusively Egyptian, and that another State was able to initiate discussions concerning the occupation of the two islands; the fact is that that State was Saudi Arabia. An agreement was concluded between Egypt and Saudi Arabia, confirming what I would call, not the annexation, but the occupation of these islands and, what is more important, the recognition that they form an integral part of the territory of Egypt.

== See also ==
- List of islands in the Red Sea
- List of islands of Saudi Arabia
