= Neom =

Planned city in Tabuk, Saudi Arabia

- City
- Logo

- Neom in Saudi Arabia
- Coordinates: 28.131088°N 34.920757°E
- Country: Saudi Arabia
- Province: Tabuk
- Announced: 24 October 2017; 9 years ago
- Founder: Mohammed bin Salman

Government
  - CEO: Aiman Al-Mudaifer

Area
  - Total: 26,500 km^{2} (10,200 sq mi)
- Time zone: UTC+03 (Arabian Standard Time)
- Website: www.neom.com

Neom (Arabic: نيوم, romanized: Niyōm; Hejazi Arabic pronunciation: [nɪˈjo̞ːm]; stylized as NEOM) is a megaproject and planned city in Tabuk Province in Saudi Arabia. Crown Prince Mohammad bin Salman, the project's main supporter and chairman, launched it in 2017.

The project was part of Saudi Vision 2030, with the intent being to diversify the country’s oil-dependent economy by creating a sustainable, carbon-neutral smart city powered by renewable energy and advanced technology. At its peak, Neom was the world's largest construction project. The site is at the northern tip of the Red Sea, east of Egypt across the Gulf of Aqaba and close to Jordan. Neom's total planned area was 26,500 km^{2} (10,200 sq mi). Planners envisioned multiple regions, including a floating industrial complex, a global trade hub, and tourist resorts.

However, Neom faced heavy criticism for its unrealistic plans. Costs were originally estimated at $1.6 trillion, growing to $8.8 trillion by 2025—more than 25 times the annual Saudi governmental budget.

By July 2022, only two buildings had been constructed, and most of the project area remained bare desert. By 2024, there were reports that Neom's size and scale would be sharply reduced from original plans. An internal audit of Neom found extensive financial problems, including "evidence of deliberate manipulation" by Neom management. By 2025, new contracts for Neom ceased and there was no mention of Neom in Saudi Arabia's pre-budget statement for 2026. In March 2026, large contracts for extensive work were cancelled.

Neom has also been criticized for environmental destruction and human rights violations. There are reports of high rates of death among workers on-site. An estimated 20,000 people are subject to forced displacement, and multiple villages have been razed. Members of the local Howeitat tribe protested against their forced expulsion. Howeitat members have been killed resisting evictions, including activist Abdul Rahim al-Huwaiti, who was killed by Saudi security forces under disputed circumstances. Three other members of the tribe were sentenced to death.

== Etymology ==
Neom means "new future". The first three letters are the Greek prefix neo meaning "new", and the fourth letter, M, represents the Arabic word for "future" (Arabic: مستقبل, romanized: Mustaqbal, Hejazi Arabic pronunciation: [mʊsˈtaɡbal]).

== History ==
Salman announced plans for the planned city at the Future Investment Initiative conference in Riyadh on October 24, 2017. He said that it would operate independently from the "existing governmental framework" with its own tax and labour laws and an "autonomous judicial system". Egypt announced in 2018 that it would contribute some land to the Neom project.

The initiative to create the region of Neom emerged from Saudi Vision 2030, a plan to reduce Saudi Arabia's dependence on oil, diversify its economy, and develop public-service sectors. According to project announcements, robots are expected to perform functions such as security, logistics, home delivery, and caregiving and for the region to be powered solely by renewable energy sources, including wind and solar power.

On January 29, 2019, the Saudi government announced that it had established a closed joint-stock company named Neom. The company, which is solely dedicated to developing the NEOM economic zone, is wholly owned by the Public Investment Fund, the Saudi government’s sovereign wealth fund.

Klaus Kleinfeld was announced by Mohammed bin Salman as the inaugural director for the NEOM project upon its launch. Kleinfeld was then announced as an advisor to Crown Prince Mohammed bin Salman and Nadhmi Al-Nasr became the CEO of Neom.

In July 2020, Neom, the American company Air Products & Chemicals, Inc., and Saudi Arabia’s ACWA Power announced plans to build what was described as the world's largest green hydrogen plant in Saudi Arabia, at Neom. Neom is an equal partner in the US$5 billion project.

In 2023, Crown Prince Mohammed bin Salman responded to critics of the project, stating: "They say in a lot of projects that happen in Saudi Arabia, it can't be done, this is very ambitious. They can keep saying that. And we can keep proving them wrong." The Wall Street Journal reported that an internal audit of the gigaproject found "evidence of deliberate manipulation" of finances by "certain members of management." A Neom spokeswoman stated the WSJ was "incorrectly interpreting" and misrepresenting the figures. By 2025, few new contracts for Neom were reported, and the project was not mentioned in Saudi Arabia's pre-budget statement for 2026.

In October 2024, an opening party for Sindalah, a luxury island destination, was held, the first in the Neom region. Following the event, Sindalah was reported by multiple outlets to have received only limited or invitation-only access and remained closed to the general public as of 2025, with its full operational status not confirmed in independent reporting. A few weeks after the opening party, Neom CEO Al-Nasr was succeeded by Aiman Al-Mudaifer, head of the Local Real Estate division at Saudi Arabia's Public Investment Fund.

According to former Neom employees, the working culture resembled Hans Christian Andersen's fairy tale "The Emperor’s New Clothes", with concerns that dissent was ignored or punished. According to the Financial Times, in 2025, Crown Prince Mohammed bin Salman, as chair of the project, proposed ambitious ideas that some staff expressed concerns about in terms of feasibility.

== Planned regions ==
=== Full list ===
Name	Announced
The Line	10 January 2021
Oxagon	16 November 2021
Trojena	3 March 2022
Sindalah	5 December 2022
Magna regions
Leyja	15 October 2023
Epicon	15 November 2023
Siranna	29 November 2023
Utamo	13 December 2023
Norlana	27 December 2023
Aquellum	10 January 2024
Zardun	24 January 2024
Xaynor	7 February 2024
Elanan	21 February 2024
Gidori	6 March 2024
Treyam	20 March 2024
Jaumur	8 May 2024

=== The Line ===
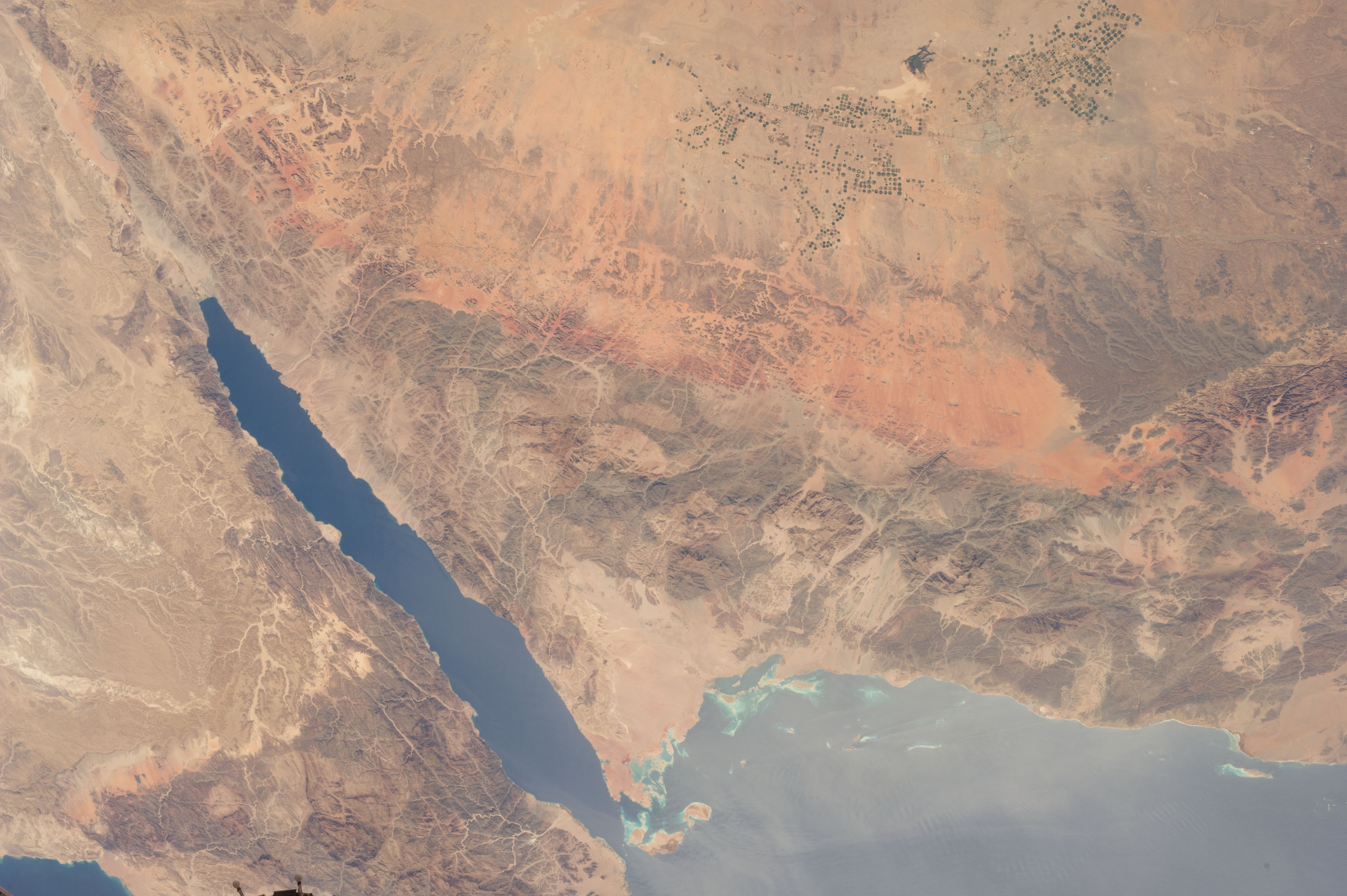
The region between the Red Sea and Tabuk, a view from ISS (2013 photo)

The Line (Arabic: ذا لاين) is a planned linear settlement in Neom, Tabuk Province, Saudi Arabia, to be housed entirely in a single very long arcology. Announced in 2021, it was envisioned as a smart city with no cars, streets or carbon emissions. The project was conceived by Saudi ruler Mohammed bin Salman, the leader of the project. By 2025, the megaproject had been substantially scaled down or suspended.

The initial plan, announced in 2021, called for the city to span 170 kilometres (110 mi) at a height of 500 m (1,600 ft) and a width of 200 metres (660 ft), with the capacity to accommodate a population of 9 million (25% of Saudi Arabia's 2022 population of 35.5 million). The Line was planned to have an entirely glass mirror exterior, with all basic services within a five-minute walking distance. The city is one of the five announced regions of Neom and was a part of the Saudi Vision 2030 project. From the start, the Line has been criticised for unrealistic costs and timelines, an impractical shape, environmental harm, and human rights violations. Thousands of people have been forcibly moved to make way for the project and villages have been razed. In 2025, the Wall Street Journal reported on an internal audit of the megaproject which found extensive problems, including "evidence of deliberate manipulation", by the managers of the project.

=== Neom Bay ===
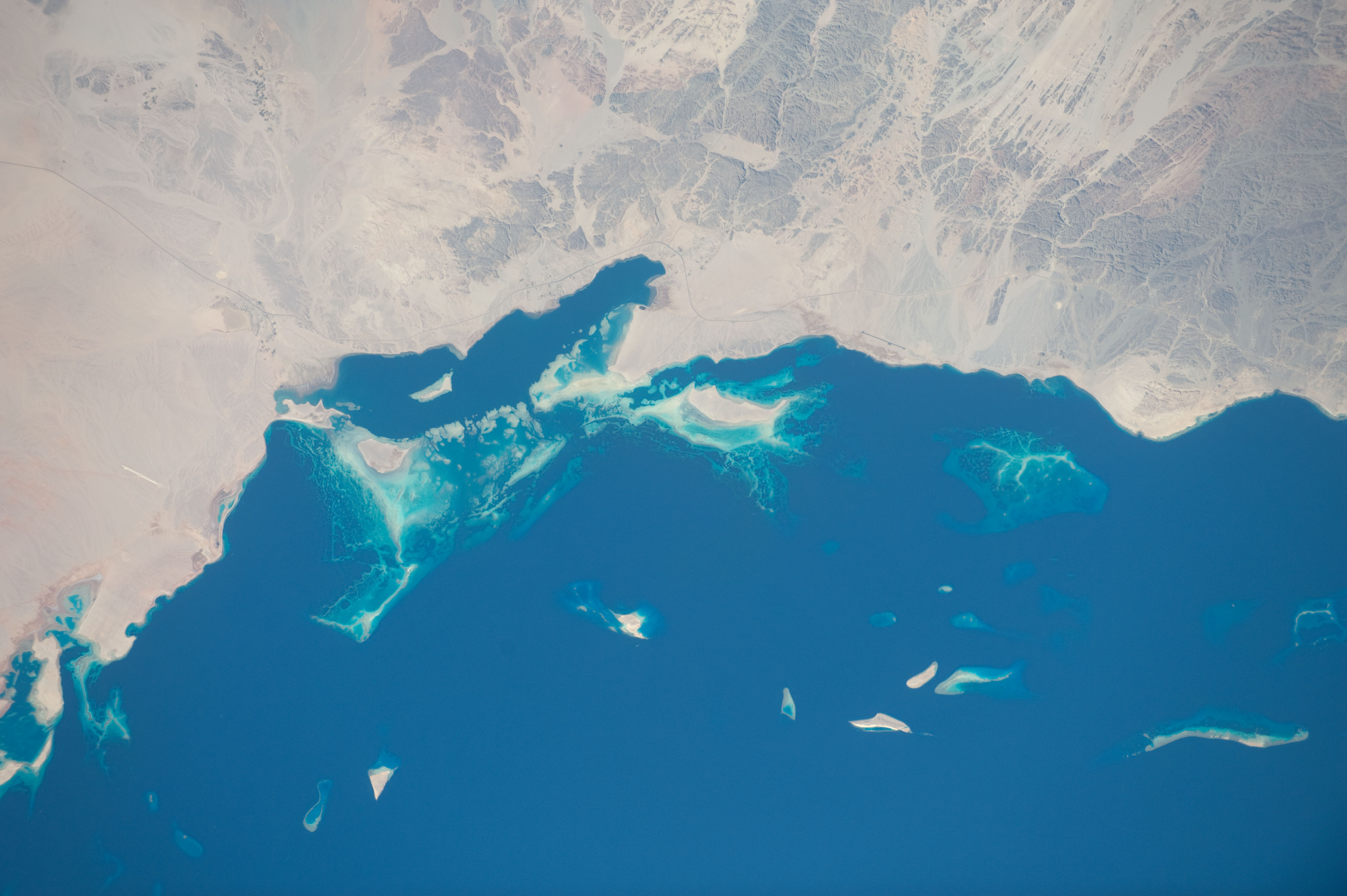
Coast and islands, Neom peninsula (middle)

The development work of the project's first phase, Neom Bay, was planned to start in the first quarter of 2019 with completion by 2020. The developments were to include constructing the airport at Sharma, which would operate regular commercial flights between Riyadh and Neom. The plan of Neom Bay's developments also involves building the first residential area in Neom as part of Phase 1.

==== Neom Bay Airport ====
In June 2019, it was announced that the Neom Bay Airport would begin commercial flight traffic after the first phase of the airport was completed with a runway length of 3,757 m (12,326 ft). The first commercial flight was by Saudia from Riyadh. The planned airport has been registered by the International Air Transport Association (IATA) with the code NUM.

=== Oxagon ===
Oxagon (originally named Neom Industrial City) was announced as a floating industrial complex in the shape of an octagon. According to the announcement, it will be located around 25 kilometres (16 mi) north of the town of Duba, and cover roughly 200–250 square kilometres (77–97 mi^{2}) of land, of which approximately 40 square kilometres (15 mi^{2}) will form the city. Oxagon is designed to focus on manufacturing, industrial research and development, incorporating the former Duba port, which has been renamed the "port of Neom". The plans for the complex include a desalination plant, a hydrogen plant, and an oceanographic research center. It will also be home to the cognitive multinational company Tonomus (originally NEOM Tech & Digital Company), which is the first subsidiary company to evolve from NEOM.

On 16 December 2022, Saudi Arabia's Ministry of Industry and Mineral Resources, the Saudi Authority for Industrial Cities and Technology Zones and Neom signed a memorandum of understanding to facilitate collaboration and legislation in support of Neom's Future Factories Program.

=== Trojena ===
On 3 March 2022, the Trojena project was launched, which could become the first major outdoor skiing destination in the Arabian Peninsula. The project's site is about 50 kilometres (31 mi) from the Gulf of Aqaba coast in the Sarat Mountains, with elevations ranging from 1,500–2,600 metres (4,900–8,500 ft). Although it is in the desert, the site's climate is considerably cooler than is the rest of Neom's territory. Ennismore, a lifestyle and hospitality company, was announced as the inaugural partner with its brands 25hours Hotels and Morgans Originals. In September 2023, Zaha Hadid Architects designed a 330 m (1,080 ft) tall skyscraper for Trojena which will stand on a mountain overlooking an artificial lake. Renders of the skyscraper, which will be connected to the lakeside development by a cable car, showed a crystalline structure made of numerous columns that narrow towards the peak.

=== Sindalah ===
In December 2022, Neom announced plans for Sindalah, an 1,100,000-cubic-yard luxury resort complex on an island off the Neom coast. It is planned to include an 86-berth marina and three luxury hotels, with a reported capacity of up to 2,400 visitors per day. A nine-hole golf course overlooking the sea was constructed in 2023.

=== Aquellum ===
In January 2024, Neom announced Aquellum, a "subterranean digitalized community of the future" that would "invert architectural principles to integrate with nature". Described as an "upside-down skyscraper", it is planned to be dug into a 450 m-high (1,480 ft) mountain, with access from an underwater square.

=== Leyja ===
Leyja is a planned tourist destination that is designed to support the Saudi Vision 2030 plan for a sustainable tourism industry. According to the Saudi Press Agency, 95 percent of Leyja's land area will be preserved for natural space. Leyja includes three Hotels which are the Adventure Hotel, designed by Office for Metropolitan Architecture (OMA), Oasis Hotel, designed by Mario Cucinella Architects (MCA), and the Wellness Hotel, designed by Killa Design. The hotels will provide 120 boutique rooms and suites.

=== Elanan ===
Announced on February 24, 2024, Elanan is a planned 80 room and suite ultra-luxury wellness retreat for guests to find "peace, rest, and rejuvenation" and is designed to blend with the surrounding nature with Mark Foster Gage as the project's architect.

=== Agriculture ===
Neom plans for 6,500 hectares (16,000 acres) of the surrounding land to become agricultural fields and to rely heavily on genetically engineered crops.

=== Utilities ===
A subsidiary, ENOWA, has been founded to provide renewable energy, green hydrogen, and zero waste desalination.

== International relations ==
In May 2022, Indian conglomerate Larsen & Toubro was awarded the contract to construct a 2,930-megawatt solar power plant, a 1,370-megawatt wind farm, a 400-megawatt battery energy storage system, and a power transmission network of about 190 km (120 mi).

After opening its first international office in London in November 2023, Neom opened its second one in New York in February 2024.

=== Suggestion of Israeli cooperation ===
Despite historically antagonistic relations, Israel is speculated to play a significant role in the development of NEOM, with some suggesting that Saudi Arabia may be expressing interest in Israeli intellectual capabilities for this purpose. It is also suggested that Israel has reciprocated this interest. In line with this, Saudi Arabia is reported to hope to establish an economic partnership with Israel to promote NEOM's economic development. In particular, analysts suggest that Saudi Arabia may be interested in enhancing economic relations with Israel's high-tech industries, which are essential to NEOM's technological vision. According to a report in an Israeli newspaper, there is purportedly evidence of coordination between Arab businessmen and diplomats in Tel Aviv, with companies in Israel said to be prepared to secure contracts worth billions of dollars. The Saudi Arabian government is also reportedly involved in such communications. Consequently, analysts have proposed that NEOM could serve as a potential impetus for normalisation between Saudi Arabia and Israel.

=== Sponsorship ===
In March 2020, Neom signed a partnership deal as a principal partner with Mercedes-EQ Formula E Team. In June 2022, Neom became the title sponsor of McLaren Racing's electric motorsport division as NEOM McLaren Electric Racing. McLaren's Formula E and Extreme E teams were also renamed as NEOM McLaren Formula E Team and NEOM McLaren Extreme E Team, respectively. Following McLaren's exit from Formula E and Extreme E, Neom continued their partnership by sponsoring McLaren's F1 Academy entrants for the 2026 season, including being the title sponsor of McLaren's second entrant as McLaren Oxagon.

In March 2021, Neom signed a four-year global sponsorship agreement with the Asian Football Confederation.

In 2022, Neom hosted Extreme E's 2022 Desert X-Prix and held the naming rights to the series' Island X-Prix in Sardinia.

== Controversies ==
=== High mortality rates ===
Researchers documented alarmingly high mortality rates among migrant workers from India, Bangladesh, and Nepal employed on Saudi construction projects, including NEOM. Government sources show that 70–80% of worker deaths are officially classified as "natural causes", but investigations reveal many workers actually collapsed at their workplaces before dying. A 2024 ITV documentary reported approximately 21,000 foreign worker deaths since construction began in 2017, with an additional 100,000 workers reported missing. This information pertains to the construction projects of "Saudi Vision 2030", which includes NEOM.

Workers report extreme conditions, including 16-hour workdays for 14 consecutive days in temperatures reaching 50°C. Many describe feeling like "trapped slaves", with some required to pay fines equivalent to five months' salary to leave their positions. Researchers collected information about migrant workers' deaths from Indian, Bangladeshi, and Nepali government sources. Across nationalities, the large majority of deaths of workers were attributed to "natural causes", which accounted for 74 percent of 1,420 Indian migrant worker deaths recorded just at the Indian embassy in Riyadh in 2023; 80 percent of 887 Bangladeshi deaths during the first 6 months of 2024; and 68 percent of 870 Nepali migrant worker deaths from 2019 to 2022. At least 13,685 Bangladeshis died in Saudi Arabia between 2008 and 2022, according to records kept by the Bangladeshi government. More than 1,500 Bangladeshis died in 2022 alone, a rate of more than four a day. Approximately 20 percent of Neom workers are from Bangladesh. Five of the nine cases Human Rights Watch documented of deaths that official documents classify as non-work-related, including by "natural causes", involved workers who collapsed at their workplace and later died, their families said.

=== Abusive work culture ===
In 2022, former employees reported NEOM project CEO Nadhmi Al-Nasr for promoting a management culture that "belittled expatriates, made unrealistic demands, and neglected discrimination in the workplace". The resignation letter of a former chief executive, Andrew Wirth, accused Nasr's leadership of being "consistently inclusive of disparagement and inappropriately dismissive and demeaning outbursts". Nasr, appointed by Prince Mohammed with the responsibility to lead NEOM, was accused in his tenure of berating and scaring his employees, as confirmed by present and former staff members. Two gigaprojects under the Saudi Vision 2030 were merged in 2022, while the remaining three projects lost their expatriate chief executives and turned over the senior management.

The Saudi government refused to comment, while Neom declined to make Nasr available for answers or interview requests. However, Neom issued a written statement in defense of Nasr and the management culture at the megaproject, asserting that Neom represented "a scale and ambition the world has never seen before" and that it continued to retain and attract more talent because "employees are passionate about what they do and deeply committed to living up to, and delivering on, the Neom vision".

Anthony Harris, a former director of innovation at Neom's education team, accused the crown prince Mohammed bin Salman of fostering a toxic workplace culture, saying, "Nadhmi takes his cue from his boss, and everyone else at Neom takes their cue from Nadhmi." At one company meeting, Nasr said on record, "I drive everybody like a slave, when they drop down dead, I celebrate. That's how I do my projects." He also threatened to replace employees stuck in other countries during the COVID-19 pandemic lockdown in 2020, which included the former director of branding and marketing.

In late 2018, Neom's progress suffered after the assassination of Jamal Khashoggi. Advisers to Neom, including Daniel L. Doctoroff and architect Norman Foster, were reported to have distanced themselves from the project and the "toxic" Saudi crown prince.

=== Evictions and executions ===
It is estimated that 20,000 people will be forced to relocate to accommodate the planned city. The Howeitat tribe, who are native to the area, have said that they do not oppose the city but would rather not face forced expulsion and violence. On 13 April 2020, activist Abdul Rahim al-Huwaiti posted videos online announcing that Saudi security forces were trying to evict him and other members of the Howeitat tribe from their historical homeland to make way for the development of Neom.

In the videos, Abdul Rahim al-Huwaiti said that he would defy the eviction orders, although he expected that Saudi authorities would plant weapons in his house to incriminate him. He was later shot and killed by Saudi security forces, who claimed he had opened fire on them. London-based human rights activist and fellow Howeitat tribe member Alya Alhwaiti disputed this version of events, stating that al-Huwaiti did not own firearms.

al-Huwaiti's funeral was held near the village of al-Khoraibah and was well attended despite the presence of Saudi security forces. Eight cousins of al-Huwaiti have been arrested for protesting against the eviction order, but Alhwaiti has said that she and other human rights activists hoped to challenge the arrests.

In June 2020, Salman signed a $1.7 million contract with the American public relations and lobbying firm Ruder Finn to counter criticism and controversy surrounding the Neom city project. In November 2020, British lawyers representing the Howeitat tribe urged Foreign Secretary Dominic Raab to boycott the G20 Summit in Saudi Arabia, arguing that the United Kingdom has a moral imperative to take a stand in defense of the tribe and confront Saudi Arabia over its human-rights issues.

In October 2022, the Specialized Criminal Court of Saudi Arabia sentenced three members of the Howeitat tribe to death for resisting displacement. The three men were arrested in 2020 for opposing the eviction of their tribe for the project. One of the condemned men, Shadli al-Howeiti, was the brother of Abdul Rahim al-Huwaiti. In May 2024, a former intelligence officer for Saudi Arabia named Col. Rabih Alenezi claimed that Saudi authorities have permitted the use of lethal force to clear land for Neom and he was ordered to shoot a villager for refusing to be evicted.

=== Surveillance ===
Designers of The Line announced plans to use data as a currency to manage and provide facilities such as power, waste, water, healthcare, transport, and security. It was said that data would also be collected from the smartphones of the residents, their homes, facial recognition cameras and multiple other sensors. According to Joseph Bradley, the chief executive of Neom Tech & Digital Co., the data sweep would help developers feed the collected information to the city to better predict and tailor to every user's needs.

However, Saudi Arabia's poor human rights record and use of espionage and surveillance technology for spying on its citizens emerged as a roadblock, according to digital rights experts. Vincent Mosco, a researcher into the social effects of technology, stated that "the surveillance concerns are justified" while further adding that "it is, in effect, a surveillance city". The Saudi Ministry of Communications and Information Technology did not respond to digital rights experts and researchers' requests for comments.

=== Viability and concept ===
The project has been critiqued as a "laboratory of false solutions" in the sense that carbon capture and storage (CCS), green hydrogen, and carbon-offsetting are said by their critics to be self-serving panaceas backed by the fossil fuel industry which do not work at scale.

In October 2022, Neom was announced as the host of the 2029 Asian Winter Games, a decision that drew criticism for its potential environmental impact. Amidst increasing global-warming concerns, the project drew multiple points of concern, including the expected high temperatures in the desert land, the energy impact, and detour of local water resources to the construction of artificial ski slopes from scratch. Raphael Le Magoariec, a political scientist and specialist in the geopolitics of sports in the Persian Gulf region said that Riyadh "mainly wants to promote its city of the future". International Ski and Snowboard Federation secretary general Michel Vion expressed surprise at the decision of the Olympic Council of Asia and Olympic downhill silver medalist Johan Clarey said, "it is awful for our sport." In 2026, Kazakhstan replaced Neom as the host the 2029 Asian Winter Games, as plans to build the Neom ski resort were scaled back.

Furthermore, Mohammed bin Salman's vision for the city includes futuristic technologies such as flying cars, robot maids, dinosaur robots, and even a giant artificial moon. Former managers and executives involved in Neom have said that the megaproject's projections are completely unrealistic and that some of them refused to sign off on plans. Dissenters and skeptics have been removed from Neom-related projects.

=== Internal audit ===
In March 2025, the Wall Street Journal reported on an internal audit of the Neom megaproject wherein it was found that executives, aided by McKinsey & Company, had relied on unrealistically rosy assumptions to justify cost overruns. The audit found "evidence of deliberate manipulation" of finances by "certain members of management". McKinsey's fees have reached $130 million in a single year.

=== NEOM Stadium plans cancelled ===
Yasir Al-Rumayyan, governor of NEOM's owner the Public Investment Fund, announced in April 2026 that The Line was not vital before 2030, and though Reuters reported in October 2026, relying on two sources, that the NEOM Stadium, planned as a venue for the 2034 World Cup, had been shelved indefinitely, Al-Rumayyan denied that any projects had been cancelled.

== See also ==
- List of Saudi Vision 2030 Projects
- Neom SC
- Ecological urbanism
- Megacity
- King Abdullah Economic City
- The Red Sea Destination
- Masdar City
- Qiddiya City
- New Murabba
- Solarpunk
- al-Ula
- Al-Ahsa Oasis
- Saudi–Egypt Causeway
