= Andrew Wirth =

American businessman and philanthropist

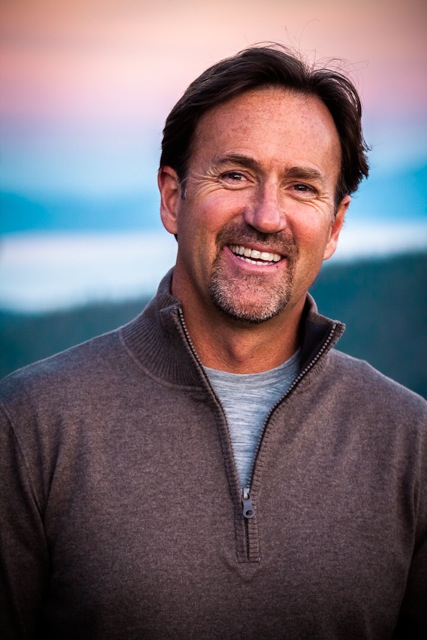
- Born: 25 July 1963 (age 63); Neubrücke, West Germany
- Education: Bachelor of Science
- Alma mater: Colorado State University
- Occupation: CEO

Andrew Wirth (born 25 July 1963) is an American businessman in the mountain resort and hotel industry. He was most recently the president and CEO of Squaw Valley Ski Holdings, the parent company of Palisades Tahoe and Alpine Meadows ski resorts in Olympic Valley, CA until 2018.

He has previously worked for Steamboat Springs Resort and Intrawest. In 2010, he became president and CEO of Palisades Tahoe. In October 2013, Wirth's right arm was torn off and surgically reattached, as a result of a skydiving accident in Lodi, California.

In 2020, Wirth worked as chief executive on NEOM, a megaproject by the authoritarian government in Saudi Arabia. NEOM has been the subject of a number of controversies including Saudi ruler bin Salman's implication in the Assassination of Jamal Khashoggi in 2018, and the 2020 attempt to evict the Howeitat Tribe from their historic homeland to make way for the development of Neom. Wirth resigned in 2022 over disagreements with NEOM CEO Nadhmi Al-Nasr.

== Early life and education ==
Wirth was born in Neubrucke, West Germany on 25 July 1963.

He has a Bachelor of Science degree from Colorado State University, and attended Edinburgh University in Scotland.

== Early career ==
Wirth's early career was with Steamboat Ski and Resort Corporation (starting in 1986). In 2007, he was promoted into the parent company Intrawest, which completed acquisition of Steamboat in 2006 for $265 million, and he was named the chief marketing officer and executive vice president of sales and marketing. At Intrawest, he managed domestic and global marketing strategy, overseeing Intrawest's full portfolio of mountain and ski resorts.

== Palisades Tahoe (Squaw Valley) ==
In 2010, Wirth was appointed the president and CEO of Palisades Tahoe ski resort. He replaced former CEO Nancy Cushing, who was exited from the position after 16 years as president and CEO. Until Wirth took over, Palisades Tahoe had always been under the direction of the Cushing family after the ski resort was founded by Wayne Poulsen in the 1940s and later owned by Nancy's late husband, Alex Cushing. Under Wirth's direction as CEO, the company underwent a $70 million upgrade.

In September 2011, it was announced that Alpine Meadows Ski Resort and nearby Palisades Tahoe would merge to offer a combined ticket pass to customers. Wirth led the acquisition of Alpine Meadows and was the president and CEO of both resorts.

Wirth is featured on the 8 March 2013 episode of Undercover Boss, where he goes undercover at his Palisades Tahoe and Alpine Meadows ski resorts.

In 2017, Squaw Valley Ski Holdings, KSL Capital Partners and the Henry Crown Company merged. The resulting holding company acquired Intrawest Resort Holdings and Mammoth Resorts.

By 2018, Palisades Tahoe announced a plan to get electricity from carbon-free sources. The company started using renewable energy at two of its resorts, building a mountain-side storage facility for Tesla Inc. batteries. Wirth stated that Palisades Tahoe would be operated by 100% renewable-sourced energy by the end of the 2018 to reduce its carbon footprint.

Andy Wirth announced his retirement from Palisades Tahoe on 14 April 2018.

== Personal life ==
He is the grandson of former US National Park Service Director Conrad Wirth and the great grandson of Theodore Wirth.

In 2013, Wirth was featured in a Wall Street Journal article about his workout routine and trail running. He has competed in half-marathons and triathlons.

In October 2013, Wirth's right arm was torn off and surgically reattached, as a result of a skydiving accident in Lodi, California. Due to changing wind conditions and other factors, Wirth, an experienced and licensed skydiver, along with other skydivers, were not able to make it to the designated landing area. He landed on steel posts and wires in a vineyard outside the landing area. He was able to slow bleeding of his brachial artery until he was airlifted to the University of California, Davis trauma center, where his arm was reattached. Additional surgeries were performed at the Buncke Clinic at the California Pacific Medical Center. Wirth returned to work after 50 days in the hospital and over 23 surgeries on his right arm.

Wirth was the Fall 2014 commencement speaker at the graduation ceremony for Colorado State University's Warner College of Natural Resources. In January 2016, he was named the chairman and president of Reno-Tahoe Regional Air Service Corporation. He is also a former board of directors member at Capital Public Radio, an NPR affiliate in the Sacramento area.

Wirth is a recipient of multiple community service and professional awards. In 2012, he was awarded the Chairman's Outstanding Service Award from the Reno-Tahoe Airport Authority Board of Trustees. He was the recipient of the 2002 Steamboat Springs Business Leader of the Year Award. In 2009, he was also awarded a spot on the HSMAI Top 25 Minds in Hospitality and Travel Sales and Marketing list. In 2014, he was recognized as Citizen of the Year by Disabled Sports USA, and received the Community Five Award.
