= Saudi–Egypt Causeway =

Proposed structure in the Strait of Tiran

Coordinates: 28.1°N 34.5°E

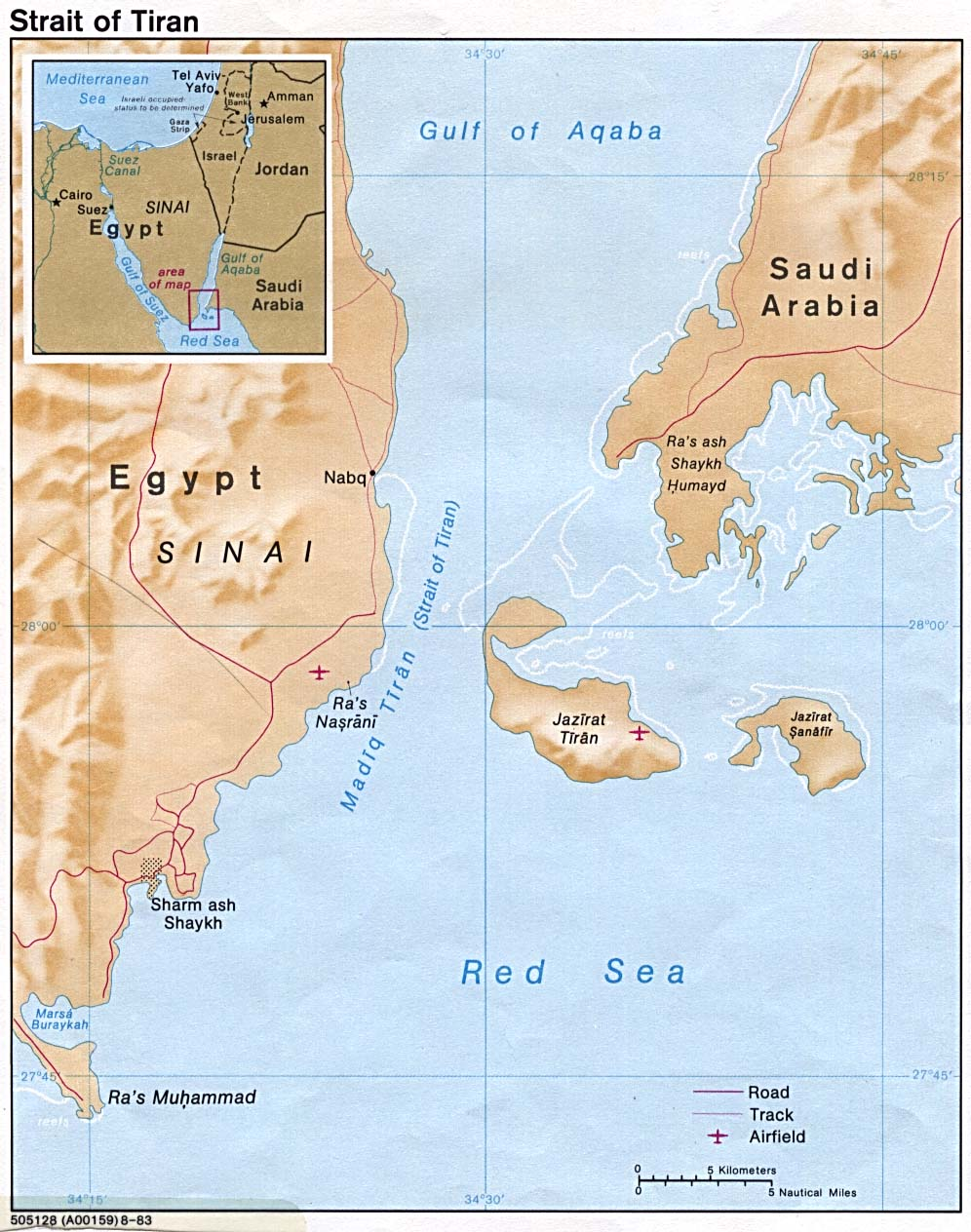
Strait of Tiran, site of the proposed project.

The Saudi–Egypt Causeway, also known as the Moses Bridge (جسر موسى, Jisr Mūsā), is a causeway and bridge project proposed to link Egypt and Saudi Arabia across the Red Sea.

The entire project is expected to cost about 4 billion US dollars and will be financed by Saudi Arabia as part of the Saudi Vision 2030 strategic framework. The causeway would link Tabuk to the Red Sea resort of Sharm el-Sheikh on the Sinai Peninsula and would pass through Tiran Island at the entrance of the Gulf of Aqaba. Funding for the causeway was announced from the Saudi Binladin Group, which would work with the Egyptian government-run firm Arab Contractors.

The proposed construction projects aim to create closer links between the two nations and create jobs on both sides. This is part of a greater plan by the Egyptian government, which intends to populate the Sinai peninsula. It will also provide an alternative pilgrimage route, and is expected to serve a million passengers and pilgrims annually.

Concerns have been raised about environment effects and by neighbors regarding security. The extra traffic and additional development could cause a further decline of the threatened Red Sea dugong population and increase damage to coral reefs and fisheries. One such organization, the Hurghada Environmental Protection and Conservation Association (HEPCA), approves a bridge subject to reefs not being harmed and an environmental survey with recommendations implemented. Article V of the Camp David Accords between Israel and Egypt provides for the right of freedom of navigation through the Strait of Tiran.

== History ==
The project was suspended in 2005 by the Hosni Mubarak government, due to security concerns voiced by Israel. Before it lost power, the Mohamed Morsi administration was reported to be interested in finalizing plans for the project in 2012 and 2013.

In April 2016, on a rare visit to Egypt, King Salman of Saudi Arabia announced with Egypt's President El-Sisi an agreement to build a bridge between the two countries. The announcement followed Egypt and Saudi Arabia signing an agreement on maritime border demarcation and marking the islands of Tiran and Sanafir within Saudi regional waters. Israel announced that it does not object to the island transfer. Egyptian president Abdel Fattah el-Sisi suggested naming the proposed structure "King Salman bin Abdulaziz Bridge" in 2016.

In 2017, Tiran and Sanafir completed the process of being transferred from Egyptian to Saudi jurisdiction, allowing planning to proceed. In November 2025, Egyptian Transport Minister announced that the planning was complete, but that construction had not yet begun.

== See also ==
- King Fahd Causeway
- The Line, Saudi Arabia
- Transport in Saudi Arabia
- Transport in Egypt
- NEOM, a planned city within Saudi Arabia
- List of bridges in Saudi Arabia
- List of international bridges
