= Straits of Tiran =

Sea passages between Egypt and Saudi Arabia

Coordinates: 28°00′14″N 34°27′55″E

- Location within Sinai Location within Egypt Location within Africa

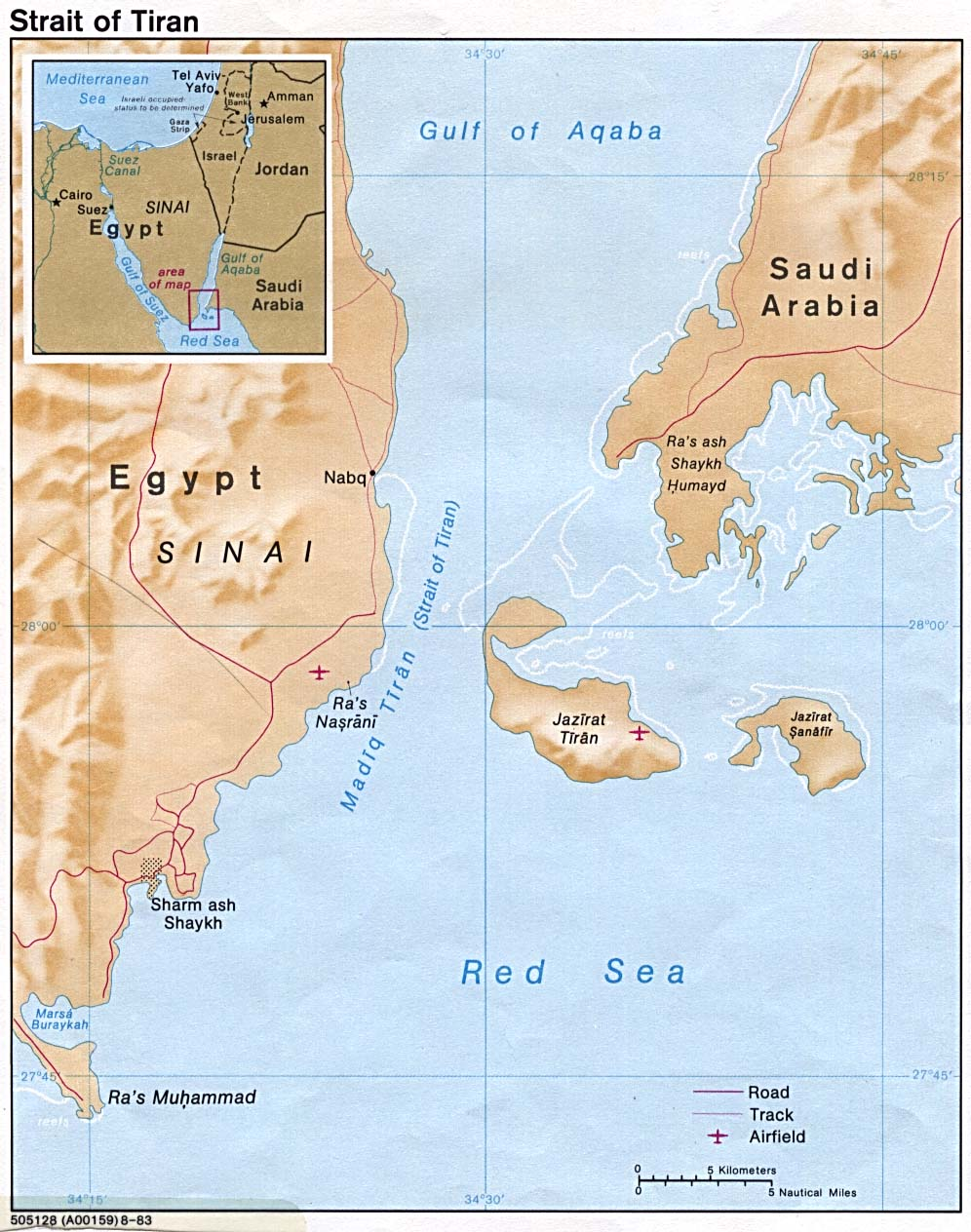
- Max. width: 13 km (7 nmi)
- Average depth: 290 m (950 ft)
- Islands: Tiran Island

The Straits of Tiran (Arabic: مضيق تيران Maḍīq Tīrān) are the narrow sea passages between the Sinai and Arabian peninsulas that connect the Gulf of Aqaba and the Red Sea. The distance between the two peninsulas is about 13 km (7 nautical miles). The Multinational Force and Observers monitors the compliance of Egypt in maintaining freedom of navigation of the straits, as provided under the Egypt–Israel peace treaty.

The body is named after Tiran Island, located at its entrance 5 or 6 km (3 or 4 mi) from the Sinai. Sanafir Island lies to the east of Tiran, southeast of the shallow strait between Tiran and Saudi Arabia.

The straits give access to Eilat, a port on the southeast tip of Israel. The blockade of Israeli passage through the Suez Canal and Straits of Tiran led to two wars, in 1956 and 1967.

== Background ==
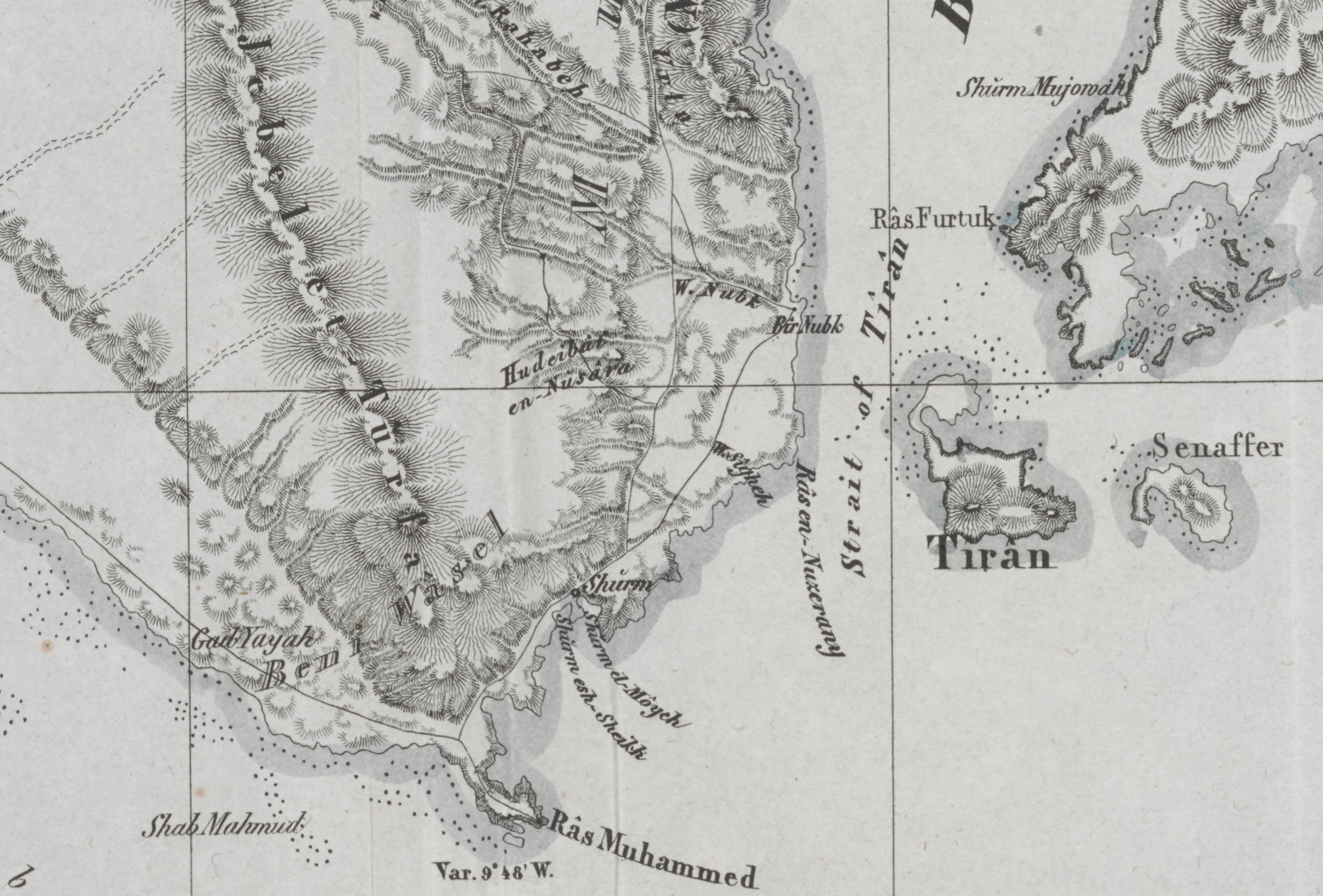
Sharm el Sheikh and the Strait of Tiran in the 1840 Kiepert map of the Sinai Peninsula.

International documents inconsistently refer to both the "Straits of Tiran" and the "Strait of Tiran". There are several passages formed by the islands between Egypt and Saudi Arabia. The westernmost strait, between Egypt and the island of Tiran, overlooked by the Egyptian city Sharm El Sheikh, is the "Strait of Tiran", 5 or 6 km (3 or 4 mi) wide. It has two passages deep enough to be navigable by large ships. The Enterprise passage, 290 metres (950 ft) deep, is adjacent to the Egyptian side, while the 73-metre (240 ft)-deep Grafton passage, surrounded by shallows, is to the east, nearer to the island of Tiran. To the east of Tiran, between it and Saudi Arabia, the other strait has reefs and shallows with a single channel 16 metres (52 ft) deep.

== Closures in 1948–1956 and 1967 ==
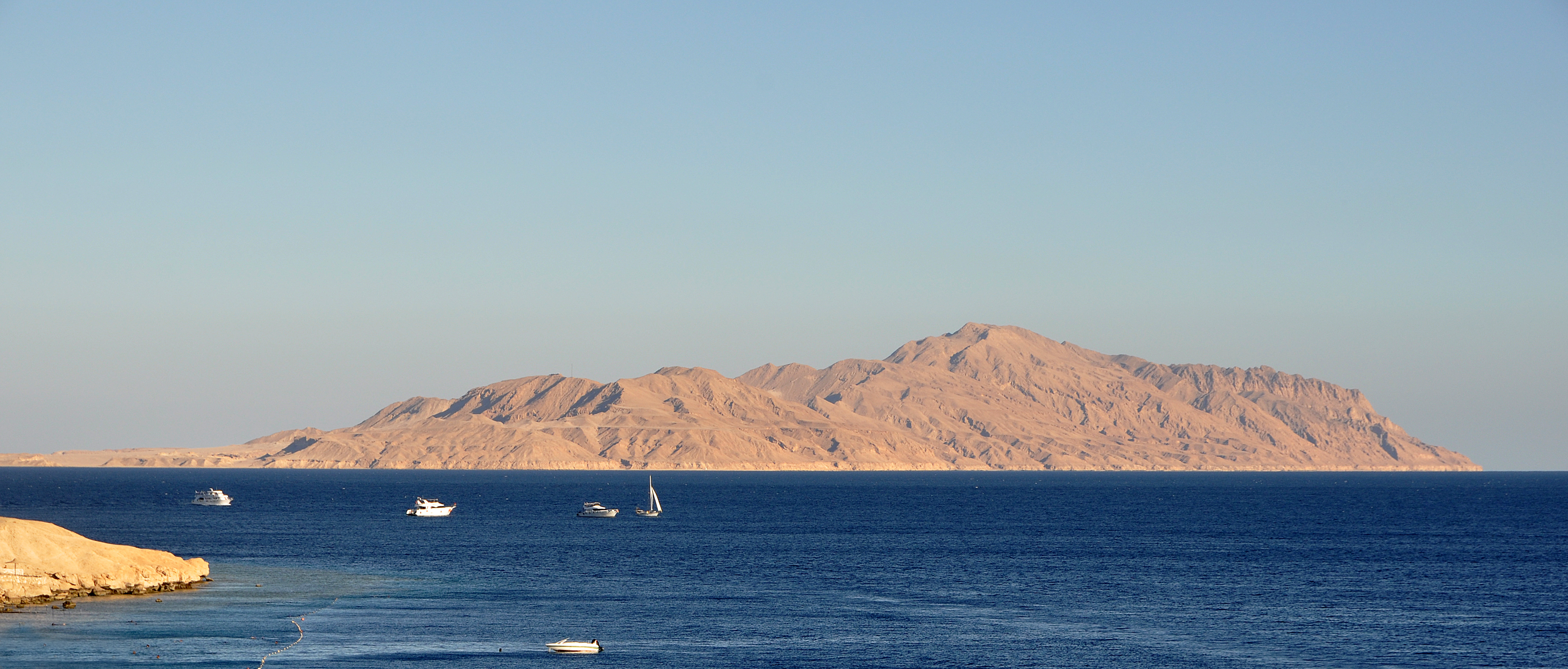
The Strait of Tiran and Tiran Island

Access to Jordan's only seaport of Aqaba and to Israel's only Red Sea seaport of Eilat is through the Gulf of Aqaba, which gives the Straits of Tiran strategic importance. In 1967, 90% of Israeli oil passed through the Straits of Tiran, making it a target of Egyptian blockade during the Arab League boycott of Israel.

In May 1967, Israeli Prime Minister Levi Eshkol repeated declarations that Israel had made in 1957, saying that closure of the Straits of Tiran would be an act of war. Egypt then blockaded the straits on May 22, 1967, and oil tankers that were due to pass through the straits were required to submit documents ensuring their cargo was not destined for an Israeli port. At that time, Israel viewed the Straits of Tiran as a vital interest as it is where Israel received vital imports, mainly oil from Iran, and a blockade threatened Israel's ability to develop the Negev.

In May 1967, Major-General Indar Jit Rikhye was the Commander of the United Nations Emergency Force (UNEF) in the Sinai Peninsula when Egypt deployed its own troops in that territory and demanded that Rikhye withdraw all of his troops. Rikhye did withdraw, including from the port at Sharm El Sheikh adjacent to the straits. The subsequent closure of the Tiran Straits by Egypt was closely linked to the preceding UNEF withdrawal, because having the peacekeepers (rather than the Egyptian military) at Sharm El Sheikh was important for keeping that waterway open. Later in life, General Rikhye sought to downplay the importance that Israel attached to keeping that waterway open, saying that Israel's accusation in 1967 of a blockade was "questionable" given that an Israeli-flagged ship had not passed through the straits in two years, and that "The U.A.R. [Egyptian] navy had searched a couple of ships after the establishment of the blockade and thereafter relaxed its implementation". Egypt had initially requested UNEF withdrawal from locations other than Sharm El Sheikh, but UN Secretary-General U Thant demanded an all-or-nothing withdrawal.

The US president at the time, Lyndon Johnson, said the following about closure of these straits being a cause of the Six-Day War:

"If a single act of folly was more responsible for this explosion than any other, it was the arbitrary and dangerous announced decision that the Straits of Tiran would be closed. The right of innocent, maritime passage must be preserved for all nations."

== Bridge project ==
The Saudi–Egypt Causeway, a proposed project to build a 15-kilometre (9.3 mi) bridge across the straits, linking Egypt and Saudi Arabia, is under consideration by the Egyptian Government.

== See also ==
- Sanafir Island
- Suez Crisis
- Six-Day War
- Yom Kippur War
- Closure of the Suez Canal (1967–1975)
- The Line, Saudi Arabia
- Saudi–Egypt Causeway, proposed bridge over the Straits of Tiran from Saudi Arabia to Egypt
- Tiran Island
- Israeli passage through the Suez Canal and Straits of Tiran
