= Linear city (Graves and Eisenman design) =

Urban plan proposed in 1965

The linear city was an urban plan proposed in 1965 by Michael Graves and Peter Eisenman for a 34 kilometer (21.1 miles) long linear settlement between New Brunswick and Trenton, New Jersey. If built, the proposed city would have been 1.6 kilometers (1 mile) wide.

Between 2014 and 2015, the Grounds For Sculpture, located near where the city would have been located, hosted an exhibit featuring the models and designs for this project.

== See also ==
- Arcology
- The Line, Saudi Arabia
- Linear city (Soria design)
- U.S. Route 1 in New Jersey
