= Tiran Island =

Island in Saudi Arabia

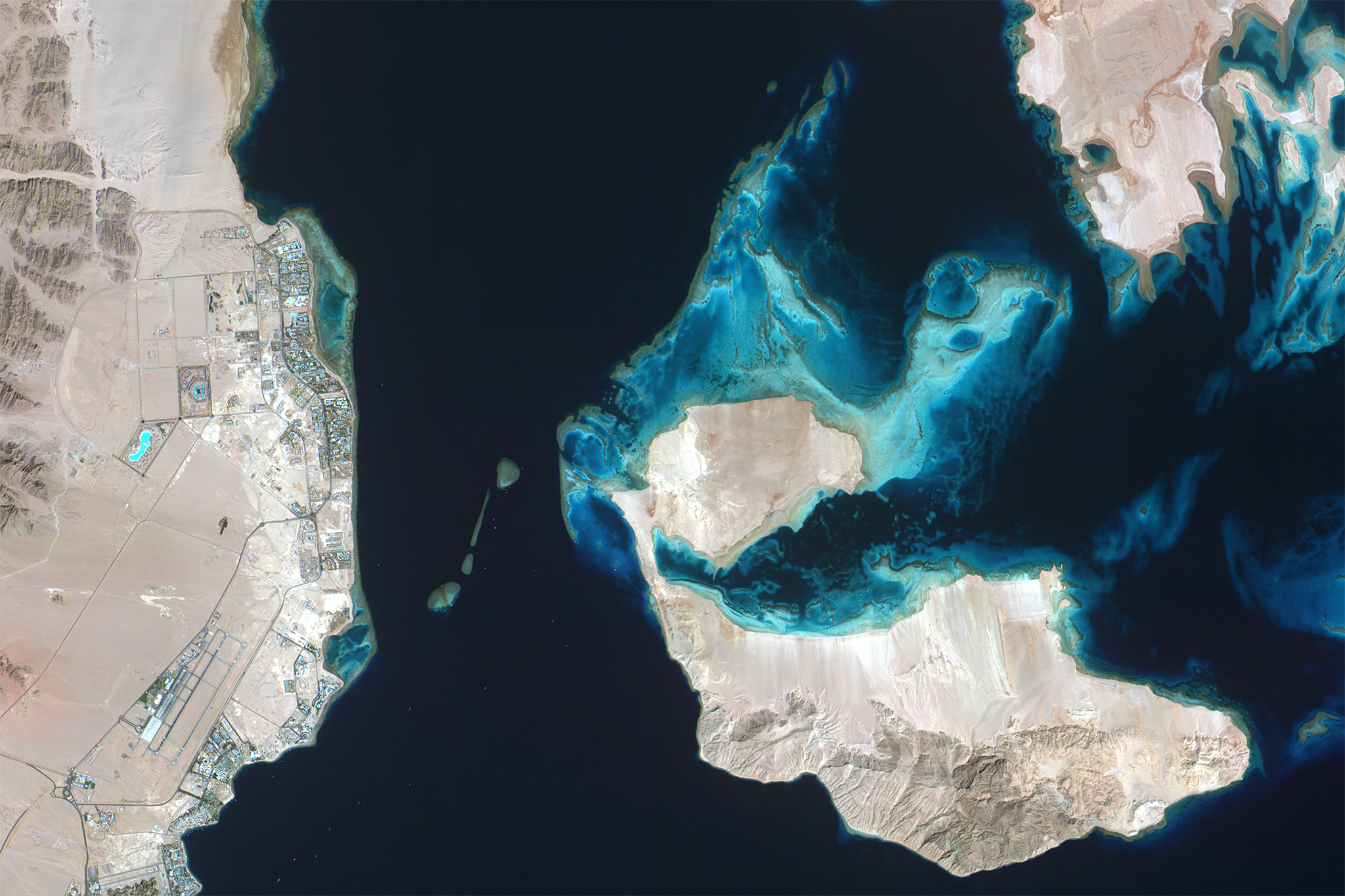
- Tiran Island viewed from space
- Interactive map of Tiran Island

Geography
- Location: Strait of Tiran, Red Sea
- Coordinates: 27°57′24″N 34°33′43″E
- Area: 80 km^{2} (31 sq mi)
- Length: 15.1 km (9.38 mi)
- Width: 7.2 km (4.47 mi)
- Highest elevation: 524 m (1719 ft)
- Highest point: Jabal Tiran

Administration
- Saudi Arabia
- Province: Tabuk Province

Demographics
- Population: 0 (2026)
- Pop. density: 0/km^{2} (0/sq mi)

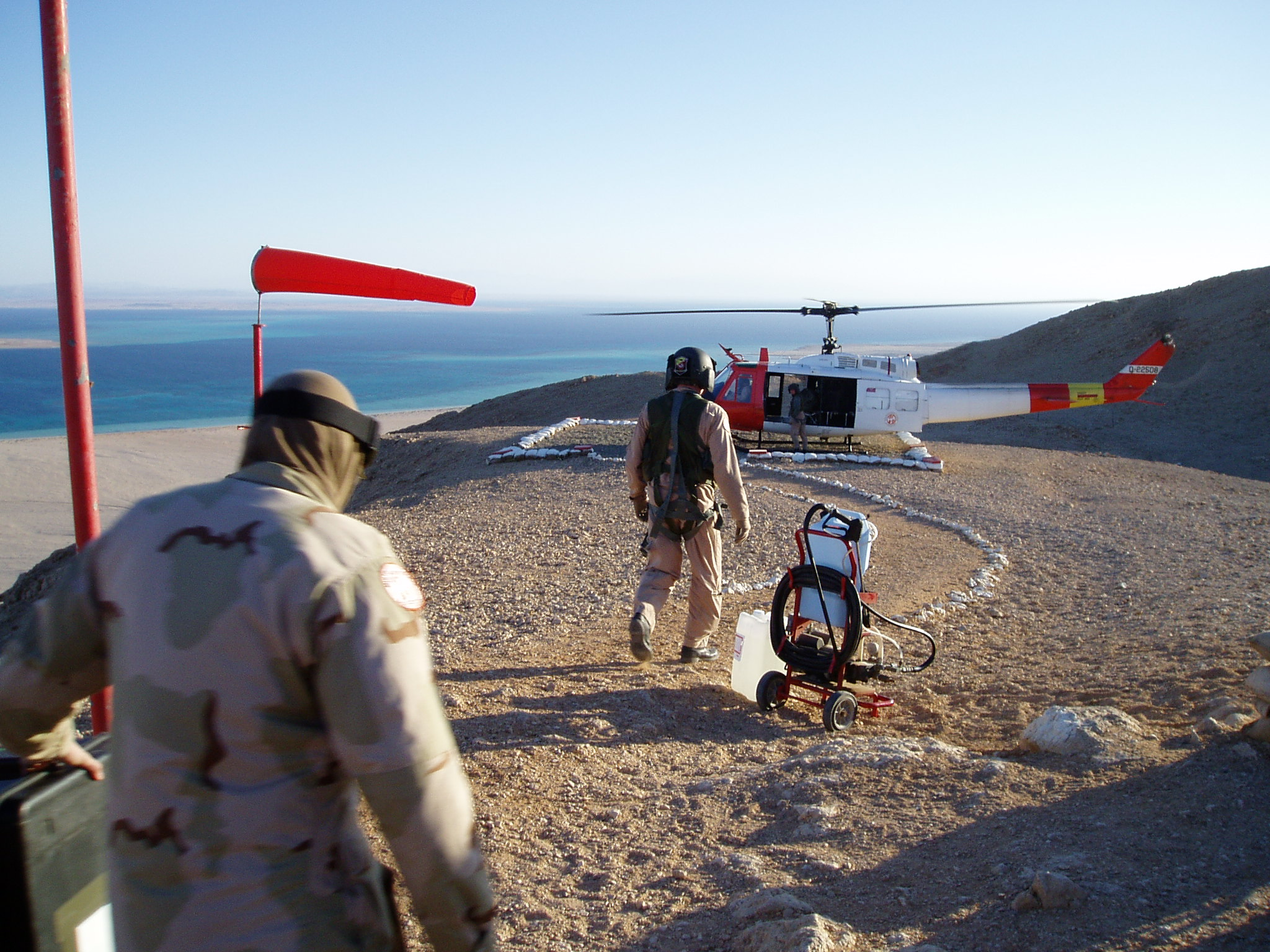
United States Task Force Sinai soldiers prepare to leave Tiran Island in 2004.

Tiran, officially Thiran Island (Arabic: جزيرة ثيران), is a Saudi Arabian island in the Red Sea, located at the entrance to the Strait of Tiran.

The island's administration was temporarily transferred by King Abdulaziz to Egypt in 1950 due to concerns of Israeli expansion while Saudi Arabia lacked a naval capability to protect the island. The island was captured by Israel during the Six-Day War and was returned to Egypt during the 1979 Egypt–Israel peace treaty. The island's administration was transferred back to Saudi Arabia by Egypt in April 2016.

== Geography ==
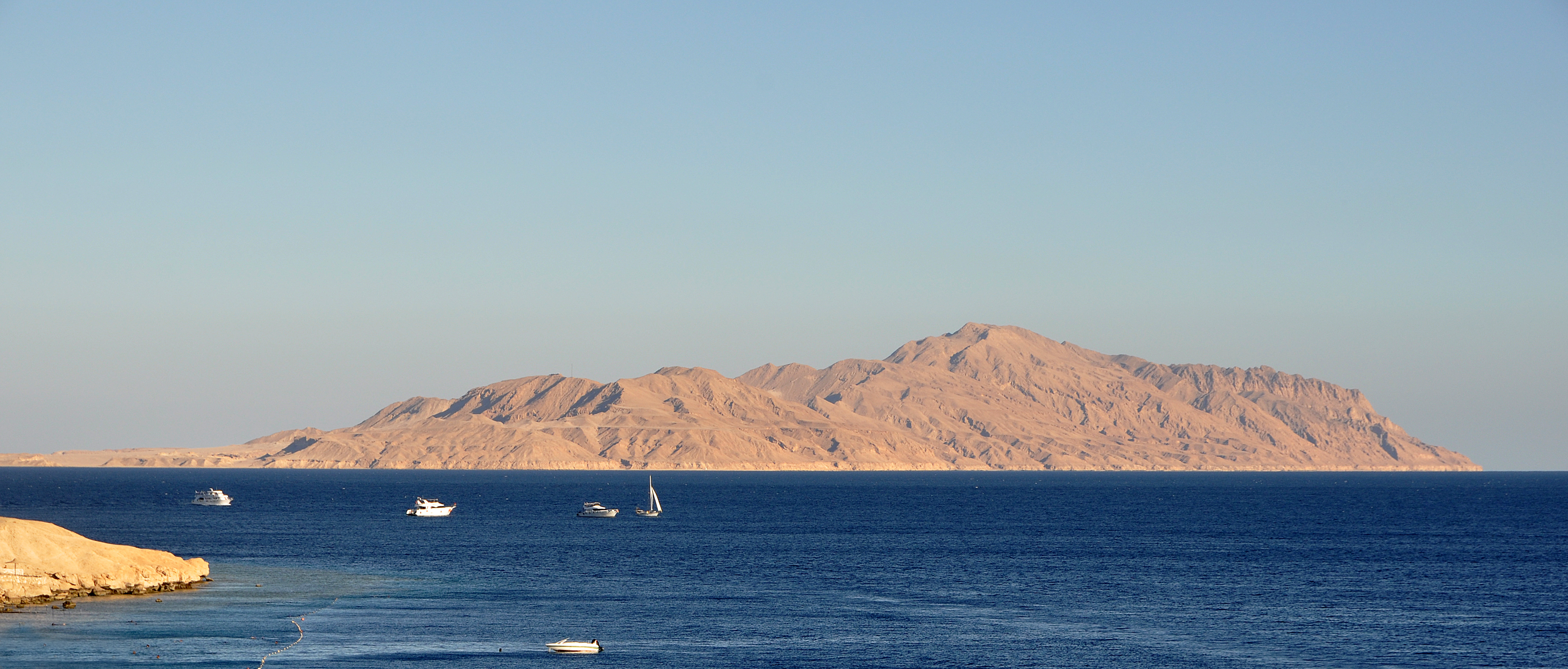
The Strait of Tiran and Tiran Island

The island is located at the entrance of the Strait of Tiran, which connect the Red Sea to the Gulf of Aqaba. It has an area of about 80 square kilometres (31 square miles) and was part of the Ras Muhammad National Park. The Straits of Tiran are Israel's only access from the Gulf of Aqaba to the Red Sea, and Egypt's blockade of them on 22 May 1967 was the casus belli for Israel starting the Six-Day War.

== History ==
=== Pre-Islamic period ===
Tiran is often identified with an island that Procopius called Iotabe (in Greek: Ἰωτάβη), which was an important toll station for shipping in the area, although other islands in the Gulf of Aqaba have also been proposed as alternative identifications. In 473, a Saracen named Amorkesos captured the island and appropriated the revenues, but the Byzantine Empire retook it 25 years later, granting its inhabitants autonomy whilst subject to payment of taxes on goods exported to India. Around 534, the Byzantines had to retake it again from a group whom Choricius of Gaza called an unholy race, and whom some scholars suppose to have been the Jewish inhabitants who had refused to pay the taxes. The existence of a Jewish population on the island is also shown by Procopius and a local inscription.

The earliest and latest dates mentioned in relation to Iotabe are given in relation to the participation of bishops of the island in the church councils: Macarius in the Council of Chalcedon in 451 (in whose acts the diocese is listed as belonging to the Roman province of Palaestina Tertia), and Anastasius in a synod held at Jerusalem in 536.

There is no mention of Iotabe in accounts of the Islamic conquests, which suggests that by then, it had become uninhabited.

Since it is no longer a residential bishopric, Iotabe, called in its Latin form Iotapa, in Palaestina, is today listed by the Roman Catholic Church as a titular see.

According to Procopius, at the island, the "Hebrews had lived from of old in autonomy, but in the reign of this Justinian they have become subject to the Romans." The reference by Procopius to an autonomous Jewish community on the island until the 6th century figures in Israeli rhetoric during the Suez crisis and during and immediately after the Six-Day War.

=== 20th and 21st centuries ===
During World War II, the Egyptian forces on Tiran and Sanafir islands were part of the contingent of Egyptian troops protecting the Suez Canal, according to Egypt's representative at the 659th UN Security Council meeting on 15 February 1954. In the same meeting, Egypt's representative considered Tiran and Sanafir an integral part of the territory of Egypt since they had been under Egypt's administration since 1906.

Egypt occupied the island in 1949 with concurrence by the Saudi government and restricted passage through the strait. Egypt and Saudi Arabia clarified their sovereignty claims to the islands in 1954, when Egypt informed the United Nations Security Council that the two islands had been sovereign Egyptian territory since the delimitation of the frontier between Egypt and the Ottoman Empire in 1906. Saudi Arabia asserted its sovereignty of the island in 1957 in a memorandum of understanding with the United Nations.

==== Israeli passage ====
In March 1949, Israeli forces took control of the area around the coastal village of Umm al-Rashrash, later renamed Eilat, as part of Operation Uvda. The uninhabited islands of Tiran and Sanafir gained strategic importance since they controlled all shipping to Eilat, Israel's only access to the Red Sea. In May 1948, Egypt blocked passage through the Suez Canal to Israeli-registered ships and to ships (Israeli or otherwise) carrying cargo to and from all Israeli ports. Since all land trade routes were blocked by other Arab states, Israel's ability to trade with East Africa and Asia, mainly to import oil from the Persian Gulf, was severely hampered.

In December 1949, Egypt started to erect military installations on Tiran, Sanafir and the Sinai coast opposite the islands to control the straits. Soon after, the Egyptian Government officially denied an intention to interfere with peaceful navigation, communicating its accord with Saudi Arabia to the UK and the US on 30 January and 28 February 1950 respectively:

Taking into consideration certain velleities which have manifested themselves recently on the part of Israel authorities on behalf of the Islands of Tiran and Sanafir in the Red Sea at the entrance of the Gulf of Aqaba, the Government of Egypt acting in full accord with the Government of Saudi Arabia has given orders to occupy effectively these two islands. This occupation is now an accomplished fact.

In the same accord, Egypt claimed its right to the islands as well as possible right for the Kingdom of Saudi Arabia:

In doing this Egypt wanted simply to confirm its right (as well as every possible right of Kingdom of Saudi Arabia) in regard to the mentioned islands which by their geographical position are at least 3 nautical miles off the Egyptian side of Sinai and 4 miles approximately off the opposite side of Saudi Arabia, all this in order to forestall any attempt on or possible violation of its rights.

==== Sovereignty agreement ====
In 1950, King Abdulaziz transferred the island ownership to Egypt under King Farouk since Ibn Saud was concerned Israel would invade the island and expand their presence while Saudi Arabia did not have a navy to protect the island. The island were not subject to the 1979 Egyptian-Israeli peace treaty as the treaty does not recognize Egyptian ownership of the islands.

According to a 2016 statement by the Egyptian Cabinet Information and Decision Support Centre, the Egyptian Chief Delegate to the UN had denied any territorial claims on the islands in May 1967, after the then Egyptian President Gamal Abdel Nasser closed the Straits of Tiran to Israeli shipping (which was considered as a casus belli by Israel to initiate the Six-Day War): "Egypt did not seek at any time to claim that the sovereignty of the two islands has been transferred to it. Rather Egypt sought only to take over defending the two islands." Shortly thereafter Tiran Island was captured by Israeli Defence Forces troops during the Six-Day War. In January 1968, the US government stood behind a failed attempt to induce Israeli withdrawal from that island as an opening move to a larger peace process.

Tiran remained under Israeli control until its return to Egypt in 1982 in fulfillment of the 1979 peace treaty signed by Egypt and Israel. The treaty includes a guarantee of freedom of Israeli shipping through the Straits of Tiran.

The 2016–2017 agreement by Egypt to hand over the islands of Tiran and Sanafir to Saudi Arabia required the approval of Israel to modify the military annex to the peace treaty. Israel was notified in writing about the transfer weeks before it was made public, and gave its approval in writing to Egypt and, indirectly, to Saudi Arabia. Saudi Foreign Minister Adel al-Jubeir publicly stated that his country would honour the Egypt–Israel peace treaty's terms as regards the island and the continued stationing of the Multinational Force and Observers (MFO) forces on the island. Israel also agreed to the construction of the Saudi–Egypt Causeway between the Egyptian and Saudi mainlands which would pass through Tiran.

However, an Egyptian court issued a final ruling that rejected the transfer of the islands to Saudi Arabia after a team of lawyers have presented historical documents in support of Egypt's integral ownership of the islands, both historically and geographically, before the court. The court confirmed Egypt's sovereignty over the two islands and stated that the government failed to provide evidence that the islands ever belonged to Saudi Arabia and that Egypt had merely been a custodian.

On 14 June 2017, however, Egypt's House Committee on Defence and National Security unanimously approved the transfer of Tiran and Sanafir Islands to Saudi Arabia, and the plan was passed by the Egyptian Parliament later the same day. On Wednesday 21 June 2017, Egypt's top court temporarily halted all court verdicts on the agreement to transfer the two Red Sea islands to Saudi Arabia. Finally, on Saturday 24 June 2017, President Abdel Fattah el-Sisi of Egypt ignored the court ruling and ratified the agreement that cedes sovereignty over the two Red Sea islands, Tiran and Sanafir, to Saudi Arabia. On 14 July 2022, Israel agreed to the deal between Saudi Arabia and Egypt. Shortly afterwards the United States announced that MFO forces would be withdrawn from the islands by the end of the year, as Saudi Arabia had not been a party to the treaty and MFO arrangement between Egypt and Israel.

== Transport ==
The proposed Saudi–Egypt Causeway would pass through Tiran Island.

== See also ==
- List of islands in the Red Sea
- List of islands of Saudi Arabia
