= Nadhmi Al-Nasr =

Saudi businessman

- نظمي النصر

Personal details
- Born: 1956 (age 69–70) Qatif, Saudi Arabia
- Education: King Fahd University of Petroleum and Minerals (KFUPM) in Dhahran, Saudi Arabia
- Occupation: CEO, Consultant, Businessman, Manager
- Title: Former CEO, Neom
- Term: 2018 – 2024
- Predecessor: Position established
- Successor: Aiman al-Mudaiferas

Nadhmi A. Al-Nasr (Arabic: نظمي النصر) is the former CEO of the NEOM project from 2018 to 2024 and is the former Executive Vice-President for Administration and Finance at King Abdullah University of Science and Technology and has held this office since 2008. He was born in 1956 in Saihat. He was the interim president of the institution in 2006 when the university was still in its infancy. Nasr's management of the NEOM project has attracted controversy, with former employees alleging abusive working conditions.

== Career ==
He has held many managerial positions, including managing the Shaybah Development Project. He spent 13 years working with international engineering and consulting firms in the US, UK, Netherlands, and Japan. In March 2006, he was named vice president of Engineering Services at Saudi Aramco. He assumed this position in April 2006.

In August 2018, he was appointed CEO of the NEOM project.

On 12 November 2024, he was replaced by the newly appointed CEO Aiman Al-Mudaifer following bad behavior, uncertainty and worker deaths.

== Controversy ==
In 2022, former employees of the NEOM project stated that Nasr had promoted a management culture that "belittled expatriates, made unrealistic demands, and neglected discrimination in the workplace". Former team members alleged Nasr had threatened to "take a gun from under [his] desk and shoot [them]"; Nasr was also recorded in a meeting saying "I drive everybody like a slave. [...] When they drop down dead, I celebrate. That's how I do my projects." Andrew Wirth, a former chief executive of NEOM, in his resignation letter accused Nasr's leadership of being "consistently inclusive of disparagement and inappropriately dismissive and demeaning outbursts."

The Wall Street Journal alleged that dozens of expatriate employees had left the project because of Nasr's management. The Saudi government refused to comment, while NEOM declined to make Nasr available for answers or interview requests. However, NEOM issued a written statement in defense of Nasr and the management culture.

== 2020 real estate power list ==
Nasr was featured in Cityscape Intelligence's most influential people in the MENA real estate industry.
