= Linear city (Soria design) =

1882 urban plan

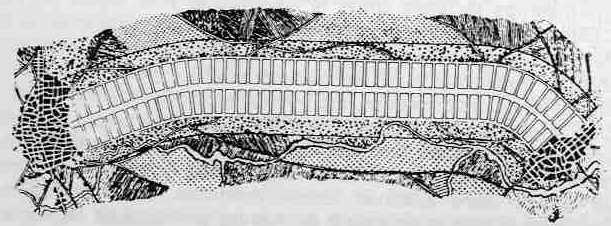
The concept of Arturo Soria's linear city.

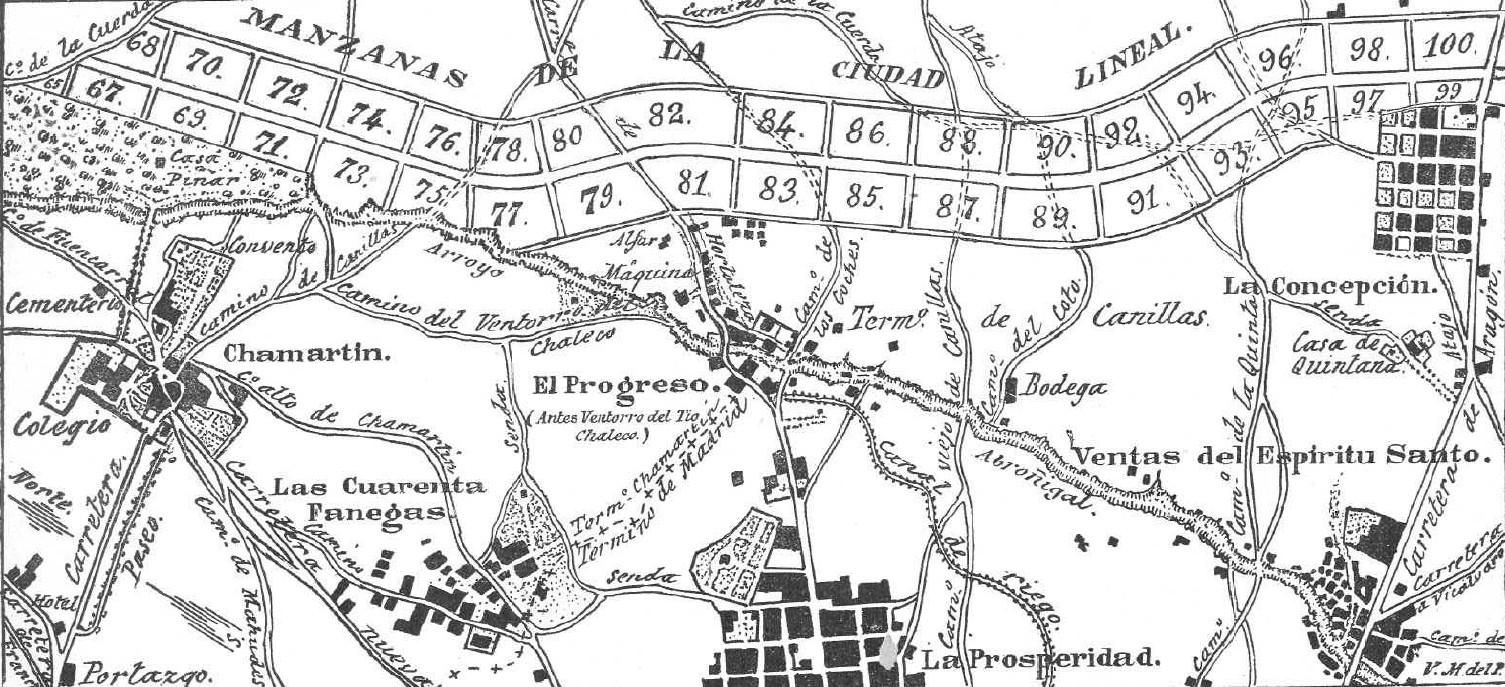
The planning of Ciudad Lineal (1895-1910) published by Madrid Urbanization Company.

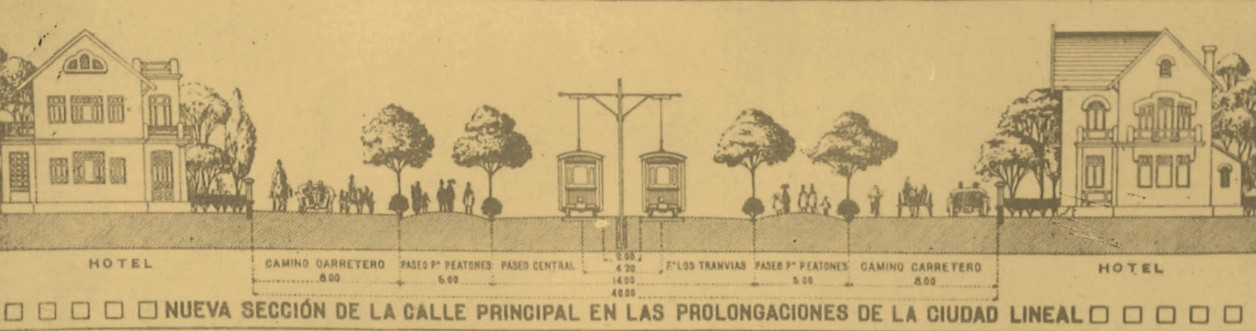
Cross-section of a linear city, with wide highways with separate sections for vehicles, pedestrians and trams.

The linear city is an urban plan for an elongated urban formation that was proposed by Arturo Soria y Mata in 1882. The city would consist of a series of functionally specialized parallel sectors. Generally, the city would run parallel to a river and be built so that the prevailing wind would blow from the residential areas to the industrial strip. The sectors of a linear city would be:

1. a purely segregated zone for railway lines,
2. a zone of production and communal enterprises, with related scientific, technical and educational institutions,
3. a residential zone, including a band of social institutions, a band of residential buildings and a "children's band",
4. a park zone,
5. an agricultural zone with gardens and state-run farms (sovkhozy in the Soviet Union).

As the city expanded, additional sectors would be added to the end of each band, so that the city would become ever longer, without growing wider.

The linear city design was first developed by Arturo Soria y Mata in Madrid, Spain during the 19th century, but was promoted by the Soviet planner Nikolay Alexandrovich Milyutin in the late 1920s. Milyutin justified placing production enterprises and schools in the same band with Engels' statement that "education and labour will be united".

Ernst May, a famous German functionalist architect, formulated his initial plan for Magnitogorsk, a new city in the Soviet Union, primarily following the model that he had established with his Frankfurt settlements: identical, equidistant five-story communal apartment buildings and an extensive network of dining halls and other public services.

== See also ==
- Ivan Leonidov
- Ciudad Lineal, a district in Madrid, planned as a linear city around the Arturo Soria avenue.
- Linear city (Graves and Eisenman design)
- The Line, Saudi Arabia, a proposed linear city.
- Kryvyi Rih, Ukraine
- Volgograd, Russia
