= Abdul Rahim al-Huwaiti =

Saudi citizen killed in 2020 by security forces

Abdul Rahim Ahmad Mahmoud al-Huwaiti
- Born: Al-Khraybah, Saudi Arabia
- Died: 13 April 2020; Al-Khraybah, Saudi Arabia
- Occupation: Government employee at the Ministry of Finance
- Known for: Resistance against eviction for the Neom project

Abdul Rahim Ahmad Mahmoud al-Huwaiti (died 13 April 2020) was a Saudi Arabian citizen and member of the Howeitat tribe, known for his resistance against the Saudi government's eviction orders for a mega-project. A government employee at the Ministry of Finance, al-Huwaiti became a symbol of protest after he was killed by Saudi security forces in April 2020, following his refusal to give up his ancestral land. His death sparked international criticism and brought attention to the impact of Saudi Arabia's Neom project on the local population.

== Early life and career ==
Al-Hawiti was a civil servant in the Ministry of Finance.

== Conflict with Saudi government ==
In April 2020, Al-Hawaiti and other residents were being pressured by the Saudi government to give up their properties and accept financial compensation for a proposed mega new city named Neom. Al-Hawaiti refused to allow the Land Registry Committee to enter his house. He posted several videos on social media protesting against the eviction.

On 13 April 2020, he posted videos online announcing that Saudi security forces were trying to evict him and other members of the Howeitat tribe from their historical homeland to make way for the development of Neom. In the videos, Al-Huwaiti said that he would defy the eviction orders, although he expected that Saudi authorities would plant weapons in his house to incriminate him.

== Death ==
Al-Hawaiti was shot dead by Saudi security forces after he refused to hand over his property for the mega project on the Red Sea. According to Saudi activists, al-Hawaiti was shot dead after recording his last video of security forces storming his property. The Saudi government has not commented on the alleged killing.

Al-Huwaiti's funeral was held near the village of al-Khoraibah and was well attended despite the presence of Saudi security forces.

Authorities in Saudi Arabia have permitted the use of lethal force to clear land for Neom, a $500 billion smart city project planned by Crown Prince Mohammed bin Salman. The BBC spoke to Colonel Rabih Alenezi, a former intelligence officer, who said he was ordered to evict villagers to make way for The Line, part of Neom. The outlet also said that one person was shot and killed for protesting against eviction. Neom is part of Saudi Vision 2030.

== Aftermath ==
On 9 June 2020, the MENA Rights Group and ALQST submitted a letter to the Special Rapporteur on extrajudicial, summary or arbitrary executions, alleging that al-Hawaiti was subjected to excessive torture by law enforcement officials and executed as a result of the use of disproportionate force acting on behalf of Saudi Arabia.

== Legacy ==
Al-Hawaiti's death sparked international attention and criticism of the Saudi government's handling of the Neom project and its impact on the local population.

== See also ==
- Rabih Alenezi
