= Linear settlement =

Type of village

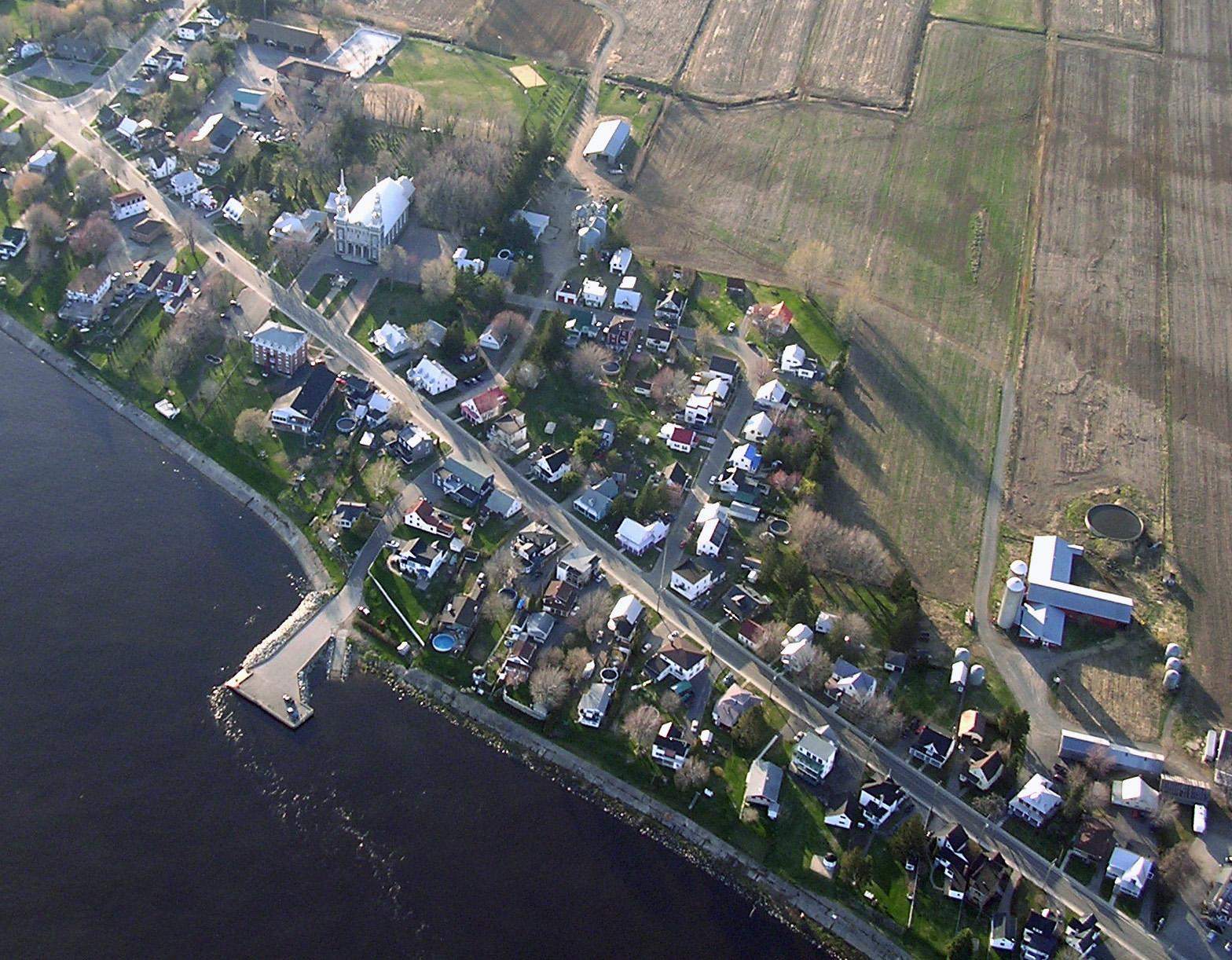
Some communities along the Saint Lawrence River in Quebec, Canada, developed as linear settlements, as is still clearly seen in Champlain

A linear settlement is a (normally small to medium-sized) settlement or group of buildings that are formed in a long line. Many of these settlements are formed along a transport route, such as a road, river, railway, tramway, or canal. Others form due to physical restrictions, such as coastlines, mountains, hills or valleys. Linear settlements may have no obvious centre.

In the case of settlements built along a route, the route predated the settlement, and then the settlement grew along the transport route. Often, it is only a single street with houses on either side of the road. Mileham, Norfolk, England is an example of this pattern. Later development may add side turnings and districts away from the original main street. Places such as Southport, England developed in this way.

A linear settlement is in contrast with ribbon development, which is the outward spread of an existing town along a main street, and with a nucleated settlement, which is a group of buildings clustered around a central point.

A sketch of a street village

Particular types of linear settlements are linear village, chain village, street village (Polish: ulicówka; German: Straßendorf, Lithuanian: gatvinis kaimas, French: village-rue), and some others. Different countries have varying classifications of linear settlements.

Sułoszowa, Poland, is notable for its 9 km long, single main street and its thin strips of farmland, inhabited by 3500 people.

== Cities and city districts ==
Linear designs have also been proposed for new city and district development projects, such as Arturo Soria y Mata's linear city, Michael Graves and Peter Eisenman's linear city, Madrid's Ciudad Lineal district, and Saudi Arabia's The Line. Such designs have been criticized as expressing a simplistic understanding of the process of urban growth and ignoring the human factor in design, resulting in inefficiency and limited growth potential.

== See also ==
- Reihendorf
- Ribbon farm
- Zeilendorf
