= Arturo Soria y Mata =

Spanish urban planner (1844–1920)

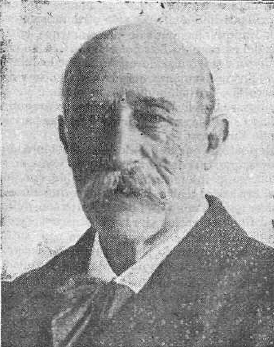
- Arturo Soria (c. 1914).
- Born: December 15, 1844; Madrid
- Died: November 6, 1920 (aged 75); Madrid
- Occupation: Architect
- Projects: Linear city (1892)

Arturo Soria y Mata (1844–1920) was an internationally important Spanish urban planner whose work remains highly inspirational today. He is most well known for his concept of the Linear City (exemplified in Madrid's Ciudad Lineal). He studied the civil engineer career (Ingeniero de Caminos), but he didn't finish it.

Arturo Soria y Mata's idea of the Linear City (1882) replaced the traditional idea of the city as a centre and a periphery with the idea of constructing linear sections of infrastructure - roads, railways, gas, water, etc.- along an optimal line and then attaching the other components of the city along the length of this line. As compared to the concentric diagrams of Ebenezer Howard and other in the same period, Soria's linear city creates the infrastructure for a controlled process of expansion that joins one growing city to the next in a rational way, instead of letting them both sprawl. The linear city was meant to ‘ruralize the city and urbanize the countryside’, and to be universally applicable as a ring around existing cities, as a strip connecting two cities, or as an entirely new linear town across an unurbanized region.
