= Huwaytat =

Hashemite clan

Huwaytat الحويطات
- Hashemite Arab tribe
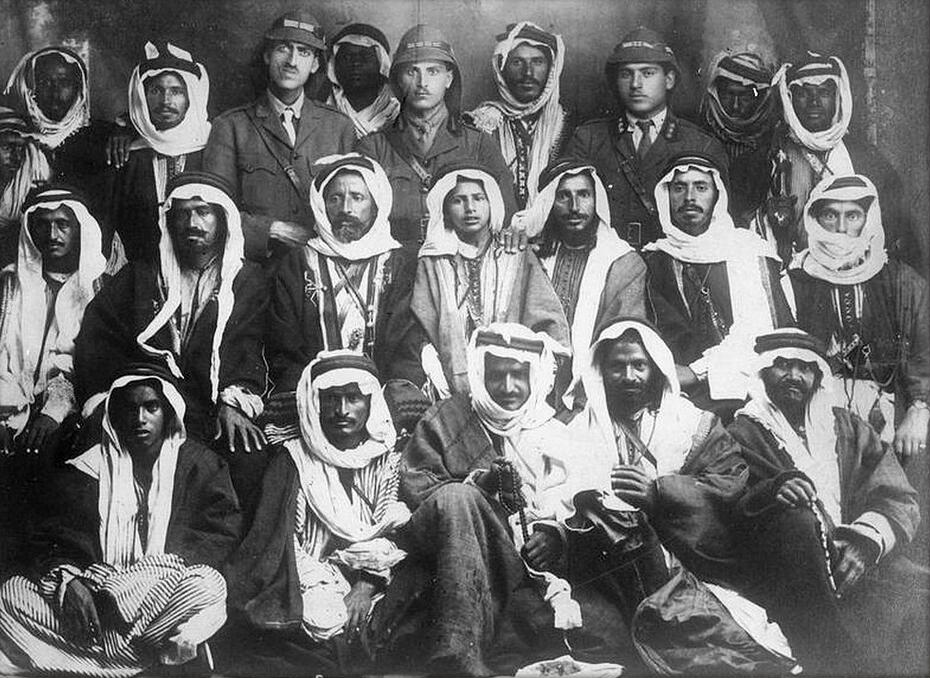
- Sheikh Auda Abu Tayi and men of his tribe with a group of officers of the Arab Army in 1916.
- Ethnicity: Arab
- Nisba: al-Huwayti
- Location: Hejaz, southern Jordan, The Negev, Sinai, Sharqia
- Descended from: ‘Alayān al-Ḥuwayṭ ibn Jamāz ibn Hāshim ibn Sālim ibn Mahnā ibn Dāwūd ibn Mahnā ibn Jamāz ibn al-Qāsim ibn Mahnā al-A‘raj ibn Ḥusayn ibn Mahnā ibn Dāwūd ibn Aḥmad al-Qāsim ibn ‘Ubaydillāh al-Amīr ibn Ṭāhir Shaykh al-Ḥijāz ibn Yaḥyā al-Nassābah ibn al-Ḥusayn ibn Abī Muḥammad Ja‘far al-Ḥujjah ibn ‘Ubaydillāh al-A‘raj ibn al-Ḥusayn al-Aṣghar ibn al-Imām ‘Alī Zayn al-‘Ābidīn ibn al-Imām al-Ḥusayn ibn al-Imām ‘Alī ibn Abī Ṭālib
- Parent tribe: al-Jammazah of the Sharif Banu al-Husayn of the Banu Hashim of the Quraysh
- Language: Arabic (Northwest Arabian dialect)
- Religion: Sunni Islam

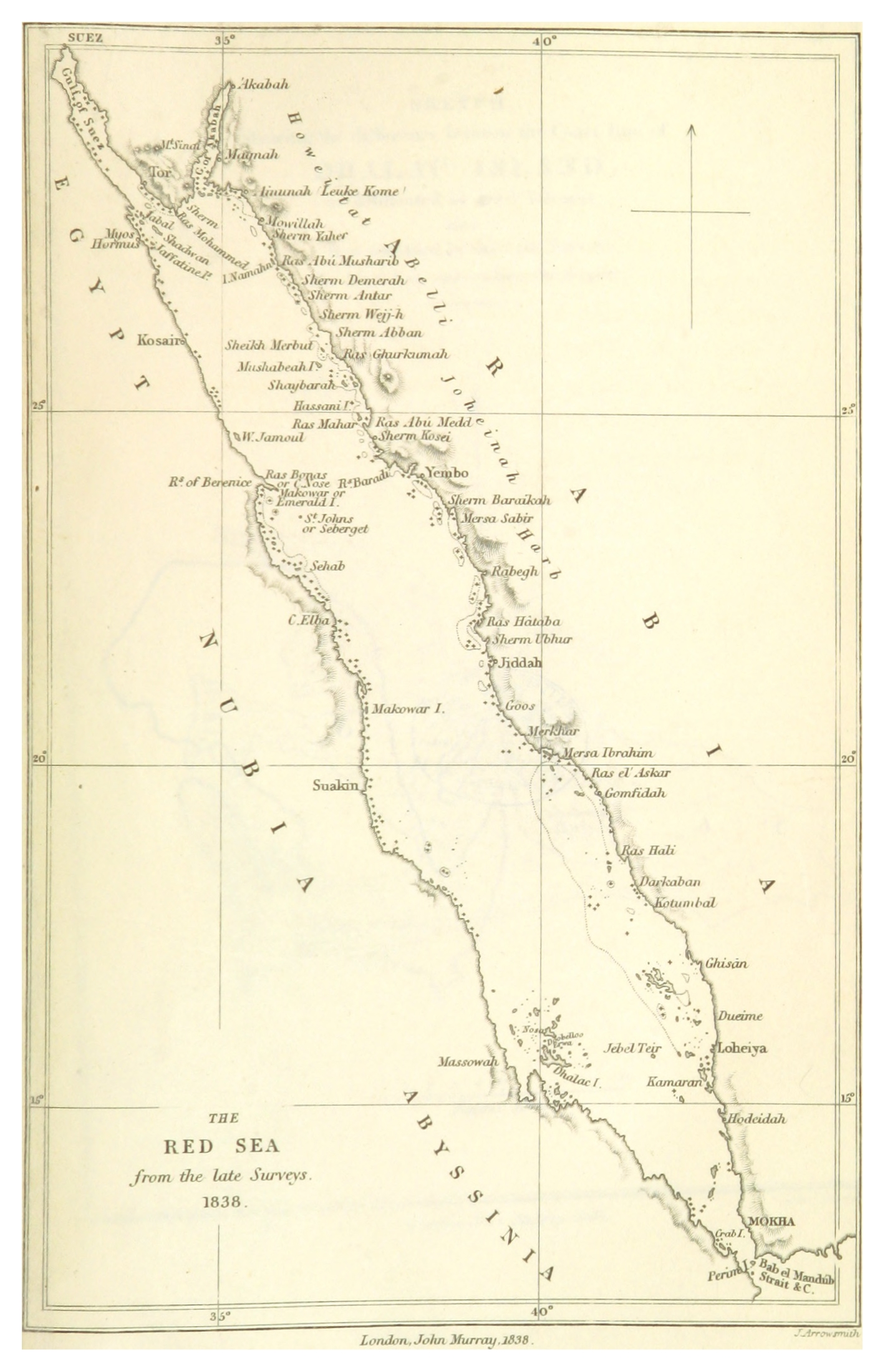
1838 map of the Red Sea region; the Howeitat are marked with a red arrow in the north section, to the east of the Gulf of Aqaba.

The Huwaytat (Arabic: الحويطات al-Ḥuwayṭāt, Northwest Arabian dialect: ál-Ḥwēṭāt) are a large Hashemite Ashraf tribe descending from Husayn ibn Ali that inhabits areas of present-day southern Jordan, the Sinai Peninsula and Sharqia governorate in Egypt, the Negev in Israel, and northwestern Saudi Arabia. The Huwaytat comprise of several branches, notably the Ibn Jazi, the Abu Tayi, the Anjaddat, and the Sulaymanniyin, in addition to a number of associated tribes.

== Genealogy and origin ==
The ancestor of the Huwaytat, Alayan al-Jammazi al-Husayni al-Hashimi, had arrived in the Syrian desert from Medina accompanied with other members of the ashraf social class in the city. He had fallen sick while upon this journey and had to stop travelling, he was taken in by the chief of the Ma'azah tribe in al-Aqaba, Atiyyah. Here Alayan had become settled, him being the only learned and literate person in the vicinity of the tribe meant that he would be able to unfold fraudulent activities and deceit done by the people of the area, thus they called him al-Huwayt, literally meaning the little wall as he kept unravelling their schemes. This name would be then taken up by his descendants.

Alayan al-Jammazi was a descendant of Ali al-Sajjad, son of Husayn ibn Ali, son of Ali and Fatima. His lineage is as follows;

‘Alayān al-Ḥuwayṭ ibn Jamāz ibn Hāshim ibn Sālim ibn Mahnā ibn Dāwūd ibn Mahnā ibn Jamāz ibn al-Qāsim ibn Mahnā al-A‘raj ibn Ḥusayn ibn Mahnā ibn Dāwūd ibn Aḥmad al-Qāsim ibn ‘Ubaydillāh al-Amīr ibn Ṭāhir Shaykh al-Ḥijāz ibn Yaḥyā al-Nassābah ibn al-Ḥusayn ibn Abī Muḥammad Ja‘far al-Ḥujjah ibn ‘Ubaydillāh al-A‘raj ibn al-Ḥusayn al-Aṣghar ibn al-Imām ‘Alī Zayn al-‘Ābidīn ibn al-Imām al-Ḥusayn ibn al-Imām ‘Alī ibn Abī Ṭālib.

== History and presence ==
Huwaytat nomads were recorded as the only tribesmen living in the southern, inland area of the Karak Sanjak of the Ottoman Empire in the 16th century.

They developed into a partly settled tribe, combining farming in the fertile areas of al-Sharat with pastoralism, but early in the 20th century were rendered more or less nomadic by the activities of two rival sheikhs, Abtan ibn Jazi and Auda Abu Tayi, who concentrated on raiding, collection of tribute and camel-herding.

== Role during the Arab revolt ==
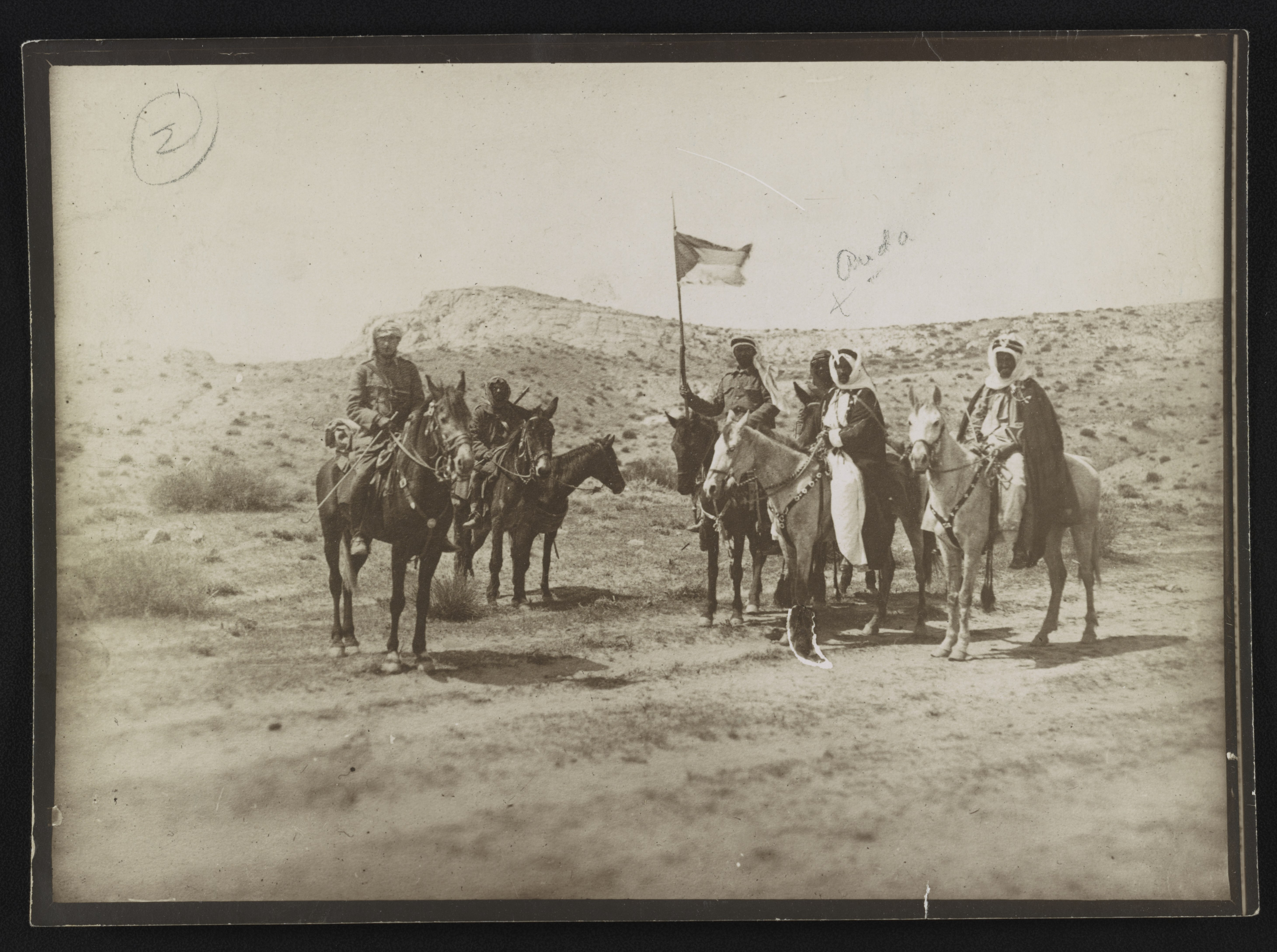
Auda Abu Tayi, chief of the Howeitat tribe, offers allegiance to King Faisal in 1917.

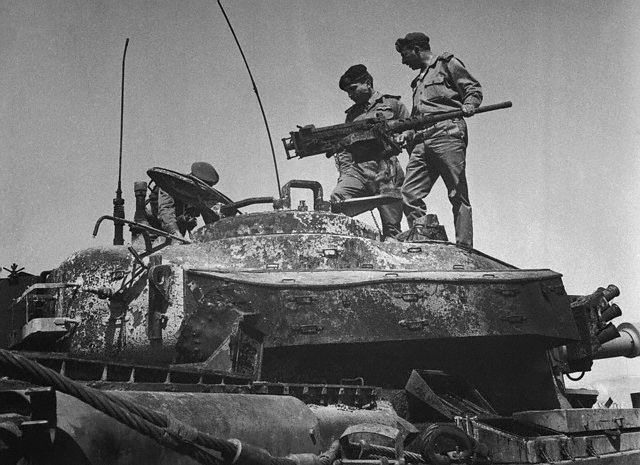
Mashour Haditha Al-Jazy (right) and the Hashemite King Hussein atop an abandoned Israeli Centurion tank, that crossed the bridge from the Jordan River's West Bank to the East Bank, in the aftermath of the Battle of Karameh.

The Abu-Tayi subclan of the tribe were supporters of the Hashemite cause during the Arab Revolt, in which they formed an important part of Faisal's forces; Auda Abu Tayi was able to muster a force of Bedouin tribesmen willing to march on Aqaba under the banner of Prince Feisal bin Hussein. The ibn-Jazi subclan of the tribe remained loyal to the Ottoman Empire: their leader Hamad ibn Jazi was decorated by the empire in early 1917. In later years, the Howeitat returned to farming; they were also prominent in the Arab Legion, the Ibn Jazi section becoming the most powerful component in the federation. The Huwaytat still have possession of large areas of land around Wadi Rum and stretching into Saudi Arabia; they have historically been a significant source of manpower for the Saudi Arabian National Guard and the Royal Jordanian Land Force.

In 1938, the Huwaytat tribe in Transjordan was estimated to be around 1,000 tents. They resided in the Ma'an and 'Aqaba region, around Tafilah, and in the plan of ash-Sher'ah in Edom.

== Present-day status and Saudi displacement ==
Nowadays, the Huwaytat tribe has largely given up its nomadic lifestyle, and settled into villages. On 13 April 2020 a Howeitat man named Abdul Rahim al-Huwaiti posted videos online announcing that Saudi security forces were trying to evict him and other members of the tribe from their historic homeland to make way for the development of Neom. Alya Abutayah Alhwaiti, a Saudi human rights activist also of the Howeitat tribe, circulated the videos. In the videos Abdul Rahim al-Huwaiti said he would defy the eviction orders though he expected Saudi authorities would plant weapons in his house to incriminate him.

He was later killed by Saudi security forces, who claimed he had opened fire on them. This version of events was disputed by Alya Abutayah Alhwaiti who said that he did not own firearms. His funeral was held near the village of al-Khoraibah and was well attended despite the presence of Saudi security forces.

Eight cousins of Abdul Rahim al-Huwaiti have been arrested for protesting against the eviction order but Alya Abutayah Alhwaiti said that she and human rights activists in the west hoped to challenge the arrests. Alhwaiti says that the Howeitat are not opposed to the development of Neom, but do not want to be evicted from their traditional homeland. Alya Abutayah Alhwaiti says she has received death threats from people she says are supporters of Mohammed bin Salman. She reported the threats to British police.

On 6 October 2020, The Independent reported that ancient Saudi Arabia's tribe Howeitat was in danger because of the $1.5 trillion hi-tech city project called Neom. In recent months the Saudi authorities allegedly arrested, harassed, hounded and even killed members of the tribe on being questioned for their plans and denied the sale of their land to the state. According to a London-based activist and spokesperson of the tribe, Alya Alhwaiti, and members of the tribe called the United Nations to investigate the matter. Alhwaiti claimed that the kingdom's crown prince Mohammed Bin Salman promised the tribe in 2016 to be a part of the Neom project along with a share in the development and improvement of the area. However, in 2020 the Howeitat tribe was instead forced to leave their land without a place to stay in exchange. In May 2023, the Saudi Arabian government convicted six members of the Howeitat tribe of "terrorism" due to their opposition to the planned city's development. Three of the convicted men received the death penalty, while the other three received sentences ranging 27 to 50 years. UN Special Rapporteurs working on behalf of the Office of the United Nations High Commissioner for Human Rights dispute the veracity of the charges and sentencing, stating that the men were "arrested for resisting forced evictions", along with alleging torture of the detained.

== Language ==
The Huwaytat speak a variety of Bedouin Arabic, specifically Northwest Arabian Arabic.

== In literature ==
The Huwaytat are often mentioned in Richard Francis Burton's travelogue The Land of Midian, in which he gives the following account of their origin:

According to their own oral genealogists, the first forefather was a lad called ‘Alayán, who, travelling in company with certain Shurafá ("descendants of the Apostle"), and ergò held by his descendants to have been also a Sherif, fell sick on the way. At El-‘Akabah he was taken in charge by ‘Atíyyah, Shaykh of the then powerful Ma’ázah tribe, who owned the land upon which the fort stands. A "clerk," able to read and to write, he served his adopted father by superintending the accounts of stores and provisions supplied to the Hajj. The Arabs, who before that time embezzled at discretion, called him El–Huwayti’ ("the Man of the Little Wall") because his learning was a fence against their frauds. He was sent for by his Egyptian friends; these, however, were satisfied by a false report of his death: he married his benefactor’s daughter; he became Shaykh after the demise of his father-in law; he drove the Ma’ázah from El-‘Akabah, and he left four sons, the progenitors and eponymi of the Midianite Huwaytát. Their names are ‘Alwán, ‘Imrán, Suway’id, and Sa’id; and the list of nineteen tribes, which I gave in The Gold–Mines of Midian, is confined to the descendants of the third brother.

— Richard Francis Burton

They are also mentioned in T. E. Lawrence's Seven Pillars of Wisdom and the film Lawrence of Arabia.
