= Farasan =

Farasan may refer to:

- Farasan Islands - archipelago in the Red Sea
- Farasan Island - largest island of the archipelago
- Farasan - largest city of the archipelago
