= Juraid Island =

Island in Saudi Arabia

Native name: جزيرة الجريد
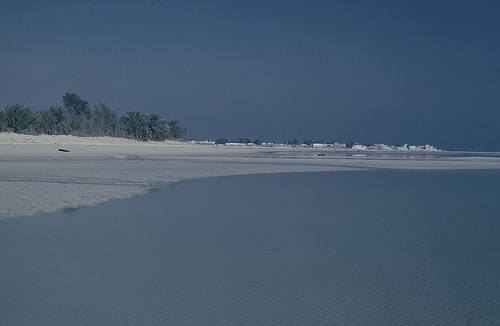
- Juraid Island in the 1970s
- Interactive map of Juraid Island (click to zoom or switch to satellite view)

Geography
- Location: Persian Gulf (45 km (28 mi; 24 nmi) northeast of Jubail)
- Coordinates: 27°11′54″N 49°57′24″E
- Area: 0.2 km^{2} (0.077 sq mi)

Administration
- Saudi Arabia
- Province: Eastern Province
- Governorate: Jubail Governorate

Juraid Island or Al-Juraid Island (Arabic: جزيرة الجريد) is a Sand island in Saudi Arabia, located in the Persian Gulf as part of Jubail Governorate in the Eastern Province. It has an area of 0.2 km^{2} (0.077 sq mi) and lies approximately 45 km (28 mi; 24 nmi) northeast of the coast.

== Wildlife ==
Juraid Island is characterized by its rich biodiversity, supporting coral reefs, diverse marine life, and significant bird populations.

=== Marine life ===
Extensive coral reefs surround the island, extending more than 0.25 mi (0.40 km; 400 m) into the Gulf. These reef systems consist primarily of brain coral (Meandra) and Acropora palmata, forming canyons, tunnels, and plateaus that sustain a diverse marine ecosystem. The reefs support numerous fish species, including Arabian angelfish, butterfly fish, and parrot fish, which display vibrant colors ranging from yellows and pinks to greens and blacks. They also harbor more dangerous species such as the zebra fish (Scorpaenidae pterois), moray eels (family Muraenidae), and various species of sharks, including the hammerhead shark (Sphyrna zygaena).

The island is a significant nesting ground for green sea turtles (Chelonia mydas), which visit the island during their breeding season from June to October. Female turtles, weighing up to 300 lb (140 kg), come ashore at night to lay between 75 and 100 eggs in carefully constructed nests. The hatching period occurs between August and late November, though many hatchlings face predation from both terrestrial and marine predators.

=== Birds ===
The island serves as an important habitat for various bird species, with three distinct tern species maintaining separate territories:

- Yellow-billed (lesser crested) tern (Sterna bengalensis) – occupies the northern shore for nesting
- Bridled tern (Sterna anaethetus) – inhabits the island's shrubland
- White-cheeked tern (Sterna repressa) – populates the remaining beach areas

The hoopoe (Upupa epops), locally known as "hud-hud", is also occasionally observed on the island and is considered a good omen in Arab culture.

== Development ==
The island is located near THE RIG, an offshore adventure tourism project developed by the Oil Park Development Company (OPDC) and announced by the Public Investment Fund in 2021.

== Gallery ==
Juraid Island in the 1970s
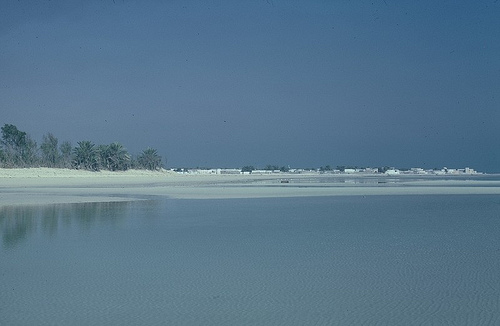

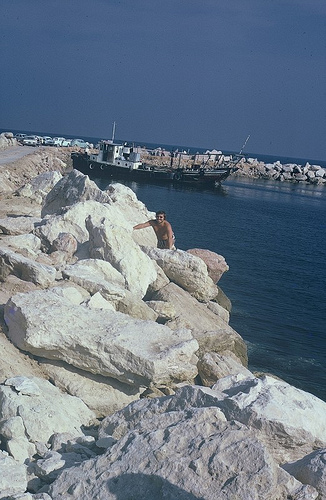

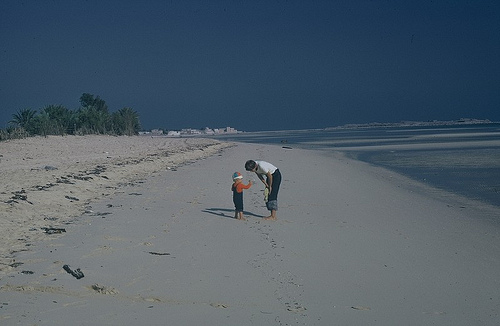

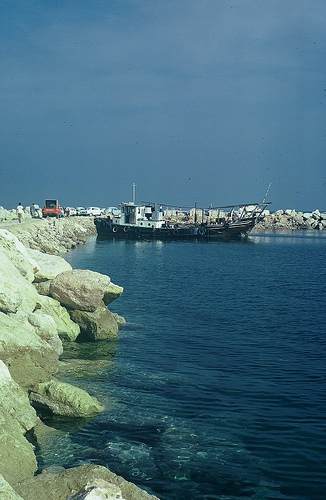

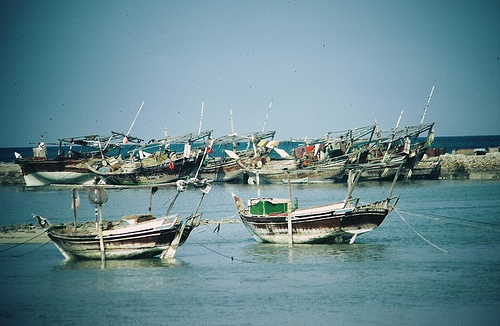

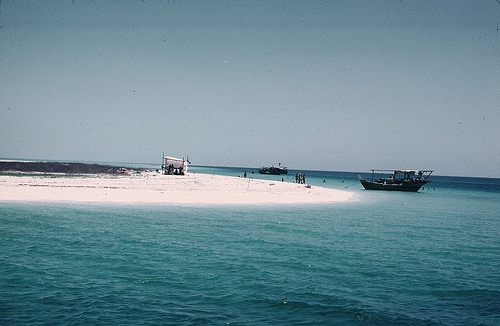

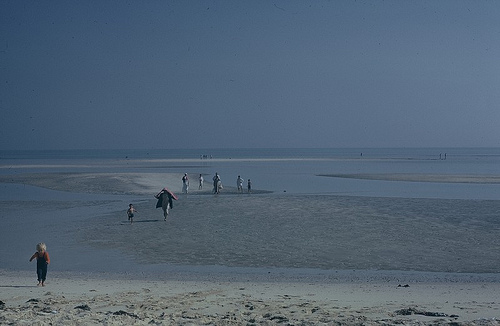

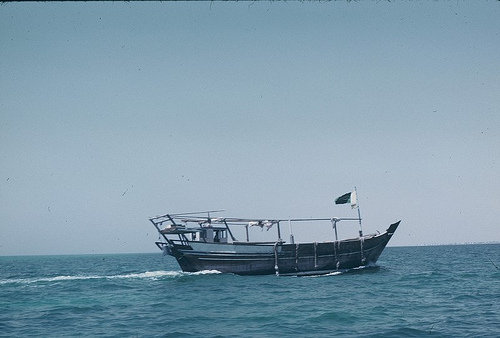
.

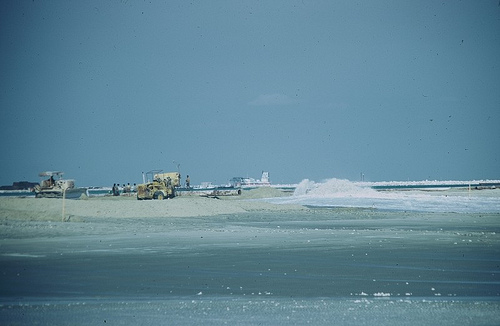
.

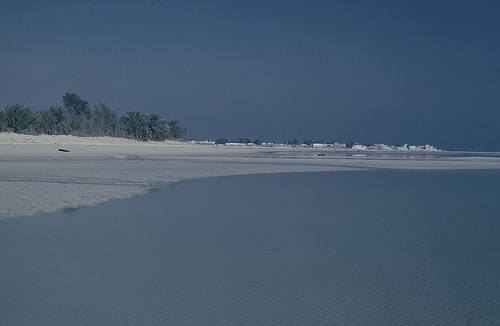
.

== See also ==
- The Red Sea Destination
- Provinces of Saudi Arabia
- List of islands in the Red Sea
- List of islands of Saudi Arabia
- List of islands in the Persian Gulf
- List of governorates of Saudi Arabia
- List of cities and towns in Saudi Arabia
