= List of islands in the Red Sea =

Islands and island groups in the Red Sea

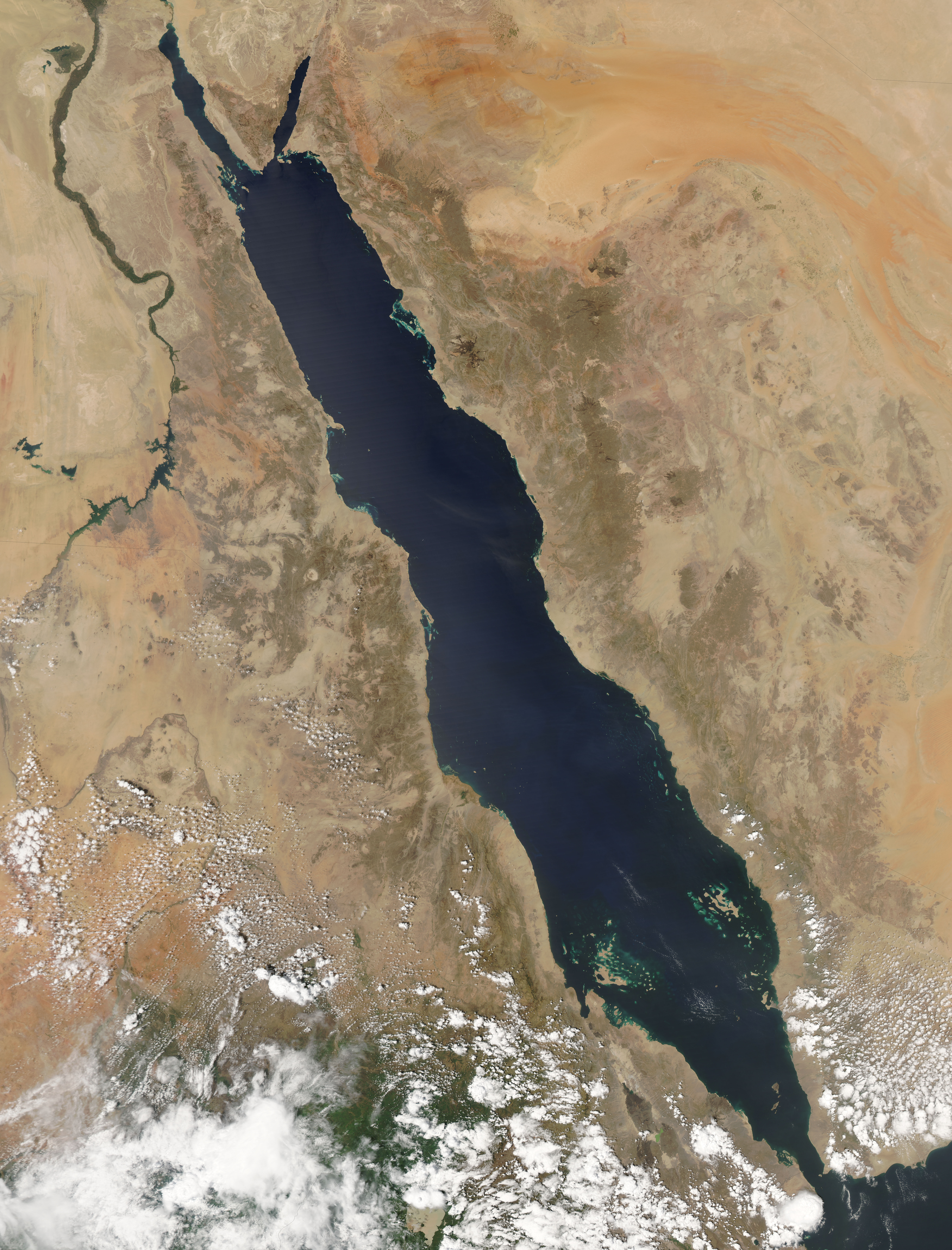
Red Sea image from NASA

Topographic map

This is a list of islands in the Red Sea. The islands in the Gulf of Suez, Gulf of Aqaba, and Bab-el-Mandeb are included. The islands are grouped by the country that administers them, disputed islands are listed under the administering country.

== Notable islands by country ==
=== Djibouti ===
- Doumeira Islands
- Kaḏḏa Dâbali
- Rocher Siyyan
- Seven Brothers Islands
- Siyyan Himar

=== Egypt ===
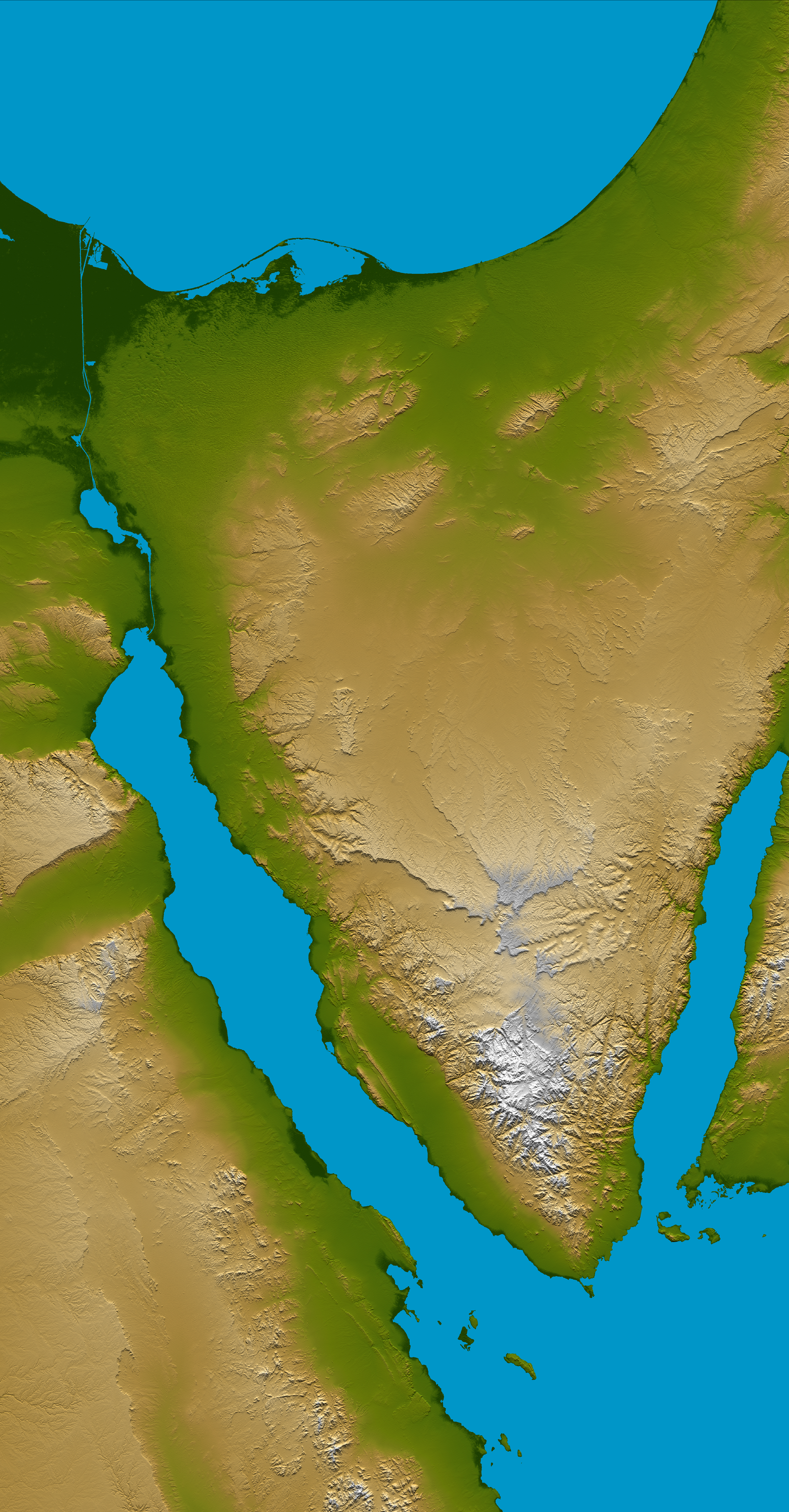
Northern Red Sea by the Sinai Peninsula, Gulf of Aqaba, and Gulf of Suez.

- El Ikhwa Islands
- Giftun Islands
- Green Island
- Mukawwa Island
- Pharaoh's Island
- Rocky Island
- Shadwan Island
- Siyal Islands
- Zabargad Island

=== Eritrea ===
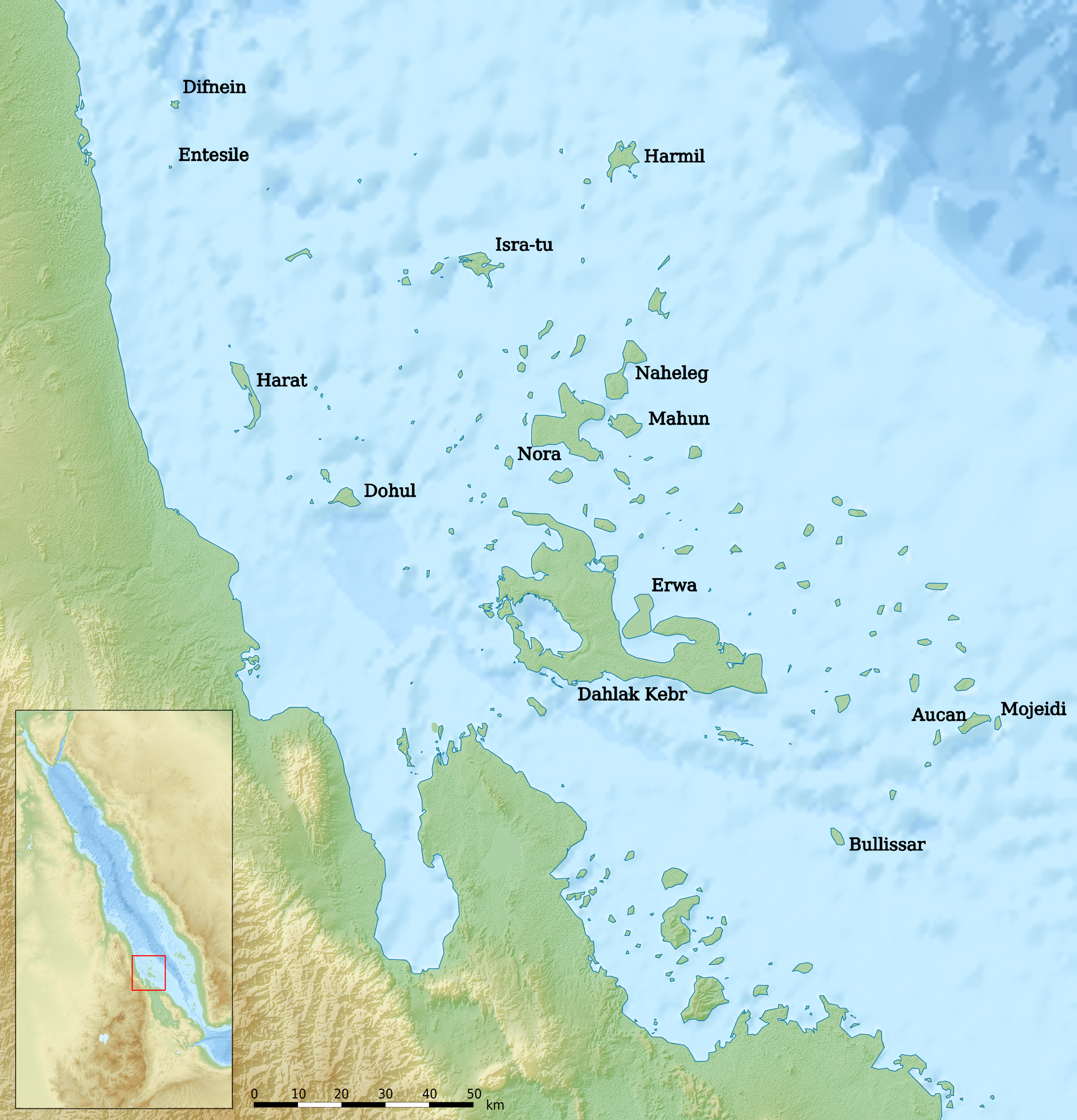
Dahlak Archipelago

- Dahlak Archipelago
- Dahlak Kebir
- Dissei
- Hando
- Harmil
- Nakura
- Nora

=== Saudi Arabia ===
- Dumsuk Island
- Farasan Island
- Farasan Islands
- Qummah Island
- Sajid Island
- Sanafir Island
- Saso Islands
- Sheybarah Island
- Shura Island
- Sindalah
- Tiran Island
- Ummahat Island

=== Sudan ===
Sudan

- Mukkawar Island
- Suakin Island

=== Yemen ===
Islands of Yemen
- Hanish Islands
- Jabal al-Tair Island
- Kamaran
- Perim
- Zubair Group
- Sholan Island: emerged during a 25-day eruption that began in December 2011
- Jadid Island: emerged during an eruption that began in late September 2013.
- Zuqar Island

== See also ==
- Archipelago
- Gulf of Aden
- List of islands near the strait of Bab-el-Mandeb
- List of islands
- List of islands of Africa
- List of geographical features of the Red Sea
