= List of islands of Saudi Arabia =

Saudi Arabia is a country in West Asia covering the bulk of the Arabian Peninsula. The country encompasses between 1,285 and 1,300 islands and islets, making it the only nation with islands in both the Persian Gulf and the Red Sea, with the vast majority of these islands situated along the Red Sea coast. This is a list of notable islands on both coasts.

== Eastern Coast ==
Island Name	Area (km²)	Distance from Coast (NM)
Eastern Province.
Abu Ali	59.3	4.5
Al-Batinah	33.7	0.7
Tarout	20.3	0.5
Al-Zakhnuniyah	12.1	0.6
Qunnah	5.4	0.8
Al-Haylamiyah	3.9	0.1
Al-Duayyinah	3.7	0.3
Al-Musallamiyah	3.1	0.5
Al-Qarmah	2.6	0.2
Mishab	1.0	0.4
Karan	1.0	31.0
Passport Island	0.88	6.75
Juthaim	0.6	0.2
Al-Thumairi	0.3	0.6
Hathba	0.25	0.2
Al-Tuyour	0.25	0.2
Northern Kaskouse	0.22	5.0
Jana	0.2	20.0
Al-Juraid	0.2	20.0
Al-Huwaysat	0.2	5.0
Halat Za'al	0.2	1.0
Southern Kaskouse	0.2	4.6
Qatif Fish Market	0.12	0.32
Al-Arabiya	0.1	50.0
Sayyad	0.1	0.2
Al-Huwaylat	0.1	0.2
Kareen	0.1	29.5
Al-Marjan	0.07	0.97
Al-Baynah	0.04	5.0
Harqus	0.03	33.5
Ajdan	0.02	0.08
Unaibir	0.01	3.0
Al-Hizah	0.01	0.1
Al-Dughaither	0.01	0.05

== Western Coast ==
Island Name	Area (km²)	Distance from Coast (NM)
Jazan Province
Farasan Al-Kabir	380.0	20.5
Sajid	150.0	23.8
Ad-Disan	36.0	39.0
Zufaf	31.3	38.0
Western Sasuh	19.4	46.0
Qummah	15.4	29.5
Dumsuk	11.2	32.1
Ras Al-Rusaybib	10.2	25.7
Mandhar Abu Al-Shouke	6.8	33.2
Kayyarah	5.0	39.0
Jabal Abu Hummad	4.5	35.3
Mandhar Sajid	4.1	22.0
Dushuk	4.1	35.8
Eastern Sasuh	3.2	45.7
Shurah	2.9	24.4
Western Rukbayn	2.3	25.2
Abkar	2.1	35.4
Ramayn	2.0	27.3
Slobah	1.6	32.8
Hubar	1.1	6.9
Aminah	1.1	7.3
Northern Soleen	1.1	17.4
Dhu Thalath (Marrak)	1.0	44.1
Tabuk Province.
Tiran	61.5	3.4
Sanafir	24.5	4.5
Sheybarah	19.8	8.4
Birrim	19.0	12.6
Umm Arumah	12.6	7.2
Jabal Hassan	10.5	7.2
Qumma'an	10.5	5.9
Suwayhil	8.7	1.7
Al-Numan	5.7	1.6
Shura (Shurayrah)	5.6	0.9
Umm Qusur	5.3	0.8
Abu Laheq	5.2	3.0
Al-Muqayti	4.4	0.1
Madrah	3.6	1.8
Al-Furshah	3.6	0.9
Southern Umm Al-Husani	3.1	0.71
Zubaydah	2.8	0.1
Ad-Dahmaniyyah	2.5	1.7
Al-Thaghba'a	2.0	1.51
Yabu'a	1.5	10.8
Central Umm Al-Husani	1.3	0.4
Reekhah	1.2	5.3
Al-Aqir	1.2	1.4
Shushah	1.0	8.2
Baraqan Al-Kabeer	1.0	7.3
Mecca Province.
Hatibah	19.5	0.2
Sharifa	18.5	0.4
Jabal As-Sabaya	11.2	10.5
Jabal Dawqah	4.8	7.8
Jabal Al-Lith	4.0	11.5
Al-Dulaydilah	3.5	0.1
As-Saqqa	2.7	5.0
Al-Ajuzah	2.6	0.9
Al-Ultah	2.1	0.5
Al-Taweela	1.8	4.6
Du'amah	1.8	0.2
Al-Dissan Al-Sagheerah	1.6	36.0
Umm Rubays	1.5	2.6
Aby Marzouq	1.3	0.2
Umm Al-Oud	1.2	2.8
Umm Al-Khidri	1.2	0.1
Umm Al-Bil	1.1	0.14
Ghurab	1.1	0.2
Thara'a	1.1	3.9
Umm Al-Qindeel	1.0	0.3
Umm Dinar	1.0	0.47
Aseer Province.
Qutnah	3.2	11.4
Hisr	1.1	0.8
Jabal Thahban	1.0	0.3

== Gallery ==
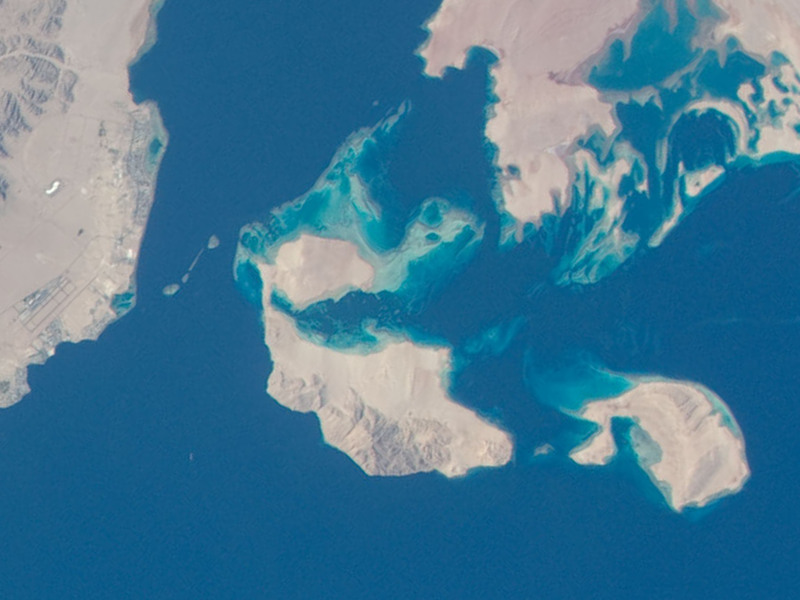
Thiran and Sanafr islands from space.

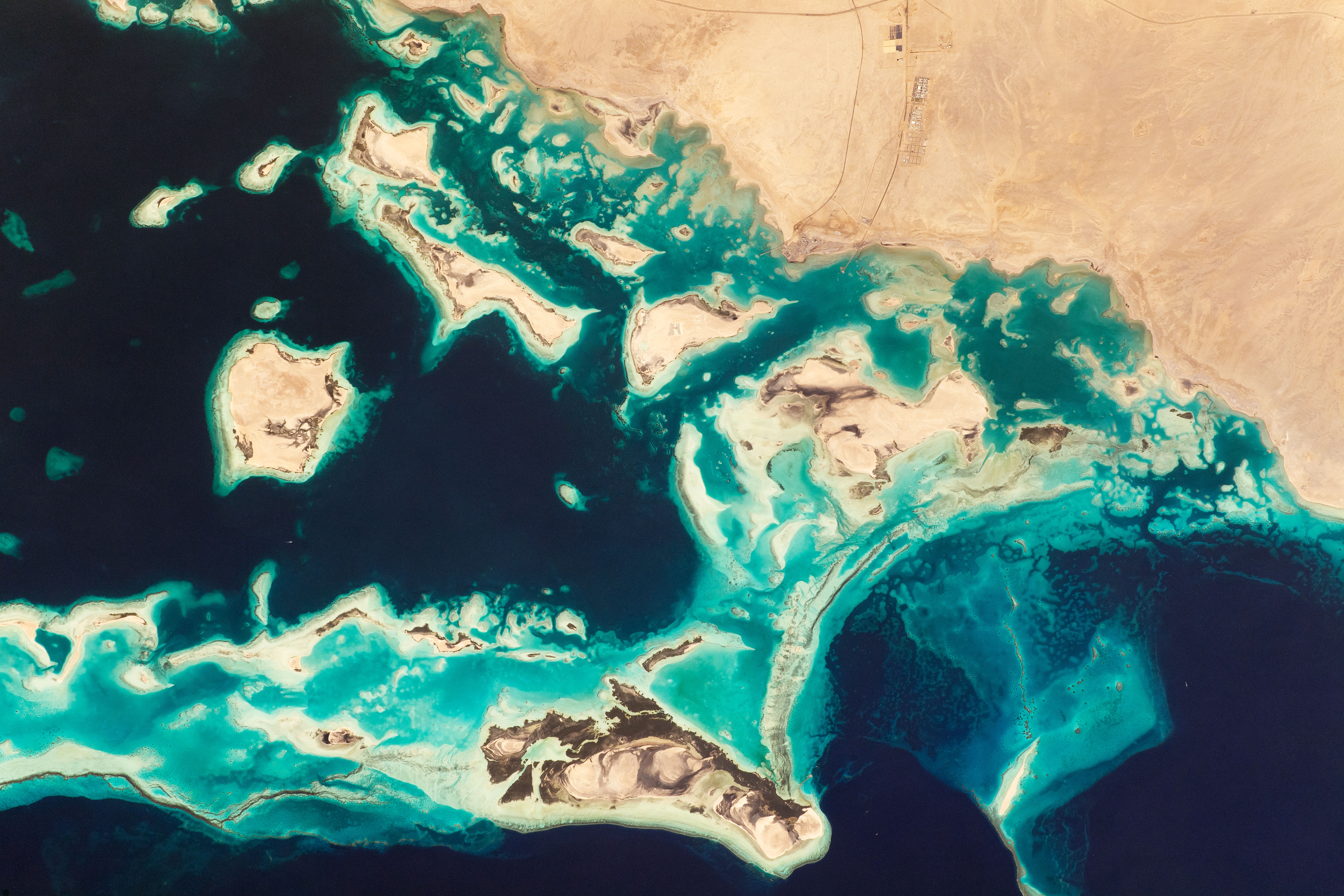
Al-Wajh Lagoon, now part of The Red Sea Destination, from space.

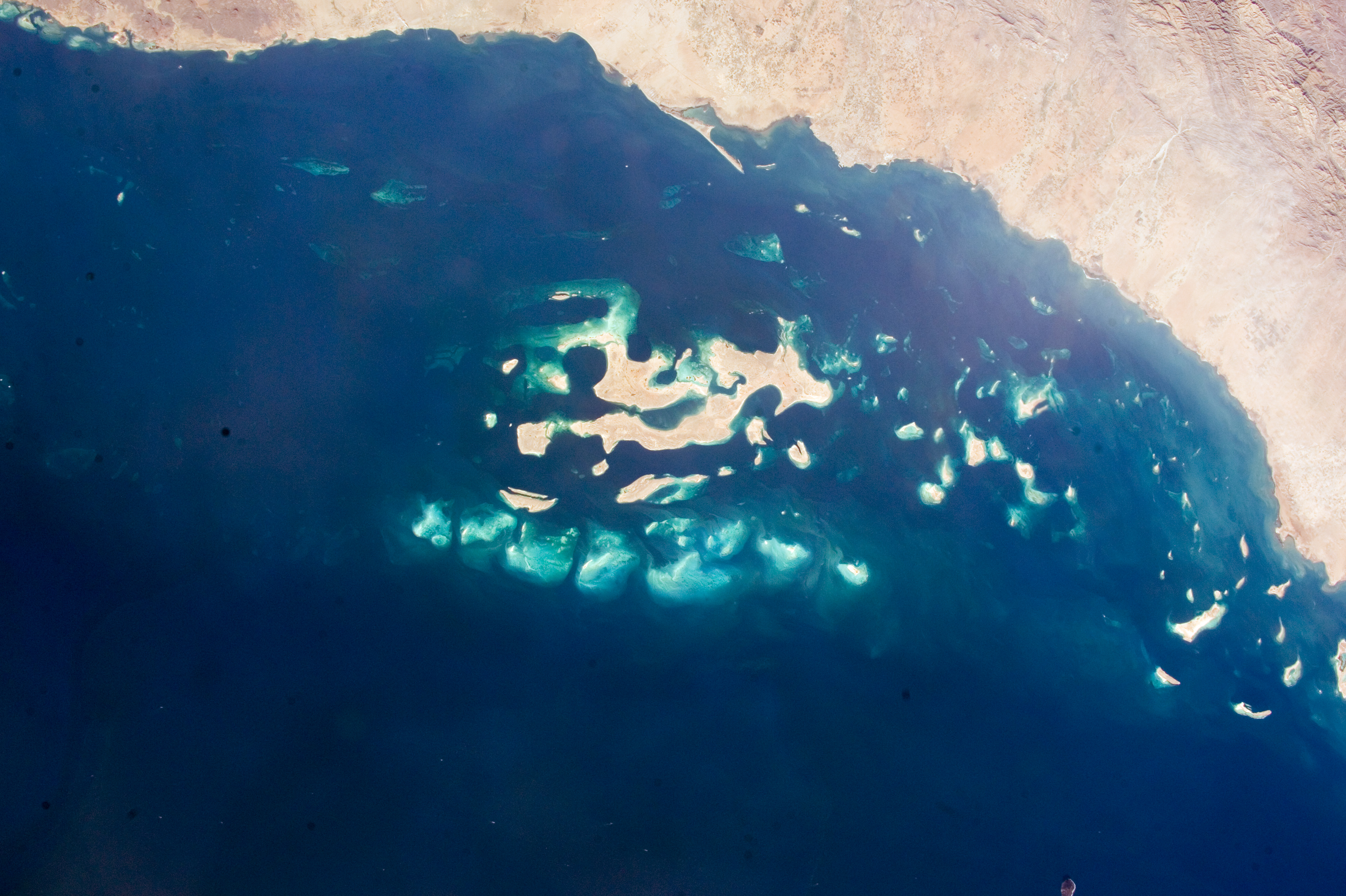
Farasan Islands Archipelago from space.

== See also ==
- The Red Sea Destination
- Provinces of Saudi Arabia
- List of islands in the Red Sea
- List of islands in the Persian Gulf
- List of governorates of Saudi Arabia
- List of cities and towns in Saudi Arabia
