= Arabi Island =

Island in Saudi Arabia

Al-Arabiya Island
Native name: جزيرة العربية
- Interactive map of Al-Arabiya Island (click to zoom or switch to satellite view)

Geography
- Location: Persian Gulf (50 nmi (93 km; 58 mi) off the coast)
- Coordinates: 27°46′43″N 50°10′34″E
- Area: 0.10 km^{2} (0.039 sq mi)
- Highest elevation: 2 m (7 ft)

Administration
- Saudi Arabia
- Province: Eastern Province
- Governorate: Jubail Governorate

Al-Arabiya Island (Arabic: جزيرة العربية), also known as Arabi Island, is an island in Saudi Arabia, located in the Persian Gulf as part of Jubail Governorate in the Eastern Province. It has an area of 0.10 km^{2} (0.039 sq mi) and lies approximately 50 nmi (93 km) off the coast.

== History ==
=== Territorial settlement ===
Both Saudi Arabia and Iran previously claimed sovereignty over Al-Arabiya Island and nearby Farsi Island. On 24 October 1968, the two countries signed an offshore boundary agreement in Tehran (entering into force on 29 January 1969) that resolved the dispute by mutually recognizing Saudi Arabian sovereignty over Al-Arabiya Island and Iranian sovereignty over Farsi Island, with an equidistant maritime boundary drawn between their overlapping territorial waters.

=== 1984 air clash ===
During the Tanker War phase of the Iran–Iraq War, the airspace near Al-Arabiya Island was the site of the first direct aerial engagement between Saudi Arabia and Iran on 5 June 1984. After Islamic Republic of Iran Air Force F-4 Phantom II fighter-bombers entered Saudi airspace near the island to target shipping lanes, two patrolling Royal Saudi Air Force F-15 Eagle fighters—supported by a United States Air Force E-3 Sentry AWACS surveillance aircraft and aerial refueling tankers—intercepted them and fired air-to-air missiles, destroying the Iranian aircraft. Iran subsequently scrambled 11 additional F-4s into the area, prompting the Royal Saudi Air Force to launch an equal number of F-15s; after a brief aerial standoff, the Iranian jets withdrew to their base without further combat.

== See also ==
- The Red Sea Destination
- Provinces of Saudi Arabia
- List of islands in the Red Sea
- List of islands of Saudi Arabia
- List of islands in the Persian Gulf
- List of governorates of Saudi Arabia
- List of cities and towns in Saudi Arabia
