= Jana Island =

Island in Saudi Arabia

Native name: جزيرة جنا
- Interactive map of Jana Island (click to zoom or switch to satellite view)

Geography
- Location: Persian Gulf (20 km (12 mi; 11 nmi) northeast of Jubail)
- Coordinates: 27°22′08″N 49°53′52″E
- Length: 1.05 km (0.652 mi)
- Width: 0.30 km (0.186 mi)

Administration
- Saudi Arabia
- Province: Eastern Province
- Governorate: Jubail Governorate

Jana Island (Arabic: جزيرة جنا) is a coral island in Saudi Arabia, located in the Persian Gulf as part of Jubail Governorate in the Eastern Province. It lies approximately 40 km (25 mi; 22 nmi) off the coast, situated on the southern edge of a shallow coral reef.

== Ecology ==
The island falls within the Jubail Important Shark and Ray Area (ISRA) in Saudi Arabia's exclusive economic zone, where whale sharks frequently gather. Its shores also serve as an important nesting ground for both the green sea turtle and the hawksbill sea turtle.

== See also ==
- The Red Sea Destination
- Provinces of Saudi Arabia
- List of islands in the Red Sea
- List of islands of Saudi Arabia
- List of islands in the Persian Gulf
- List of governorates of Saudi Arabia
- List of cities and towns in Saudi Arabia
