= 1984 Arabi Island incident =

Iran-Saudi Arabia air battle of the Iran–Iraq War

1984 Al-Arabiya Island incident
- Part of Iran–Iraq War and Tanker war
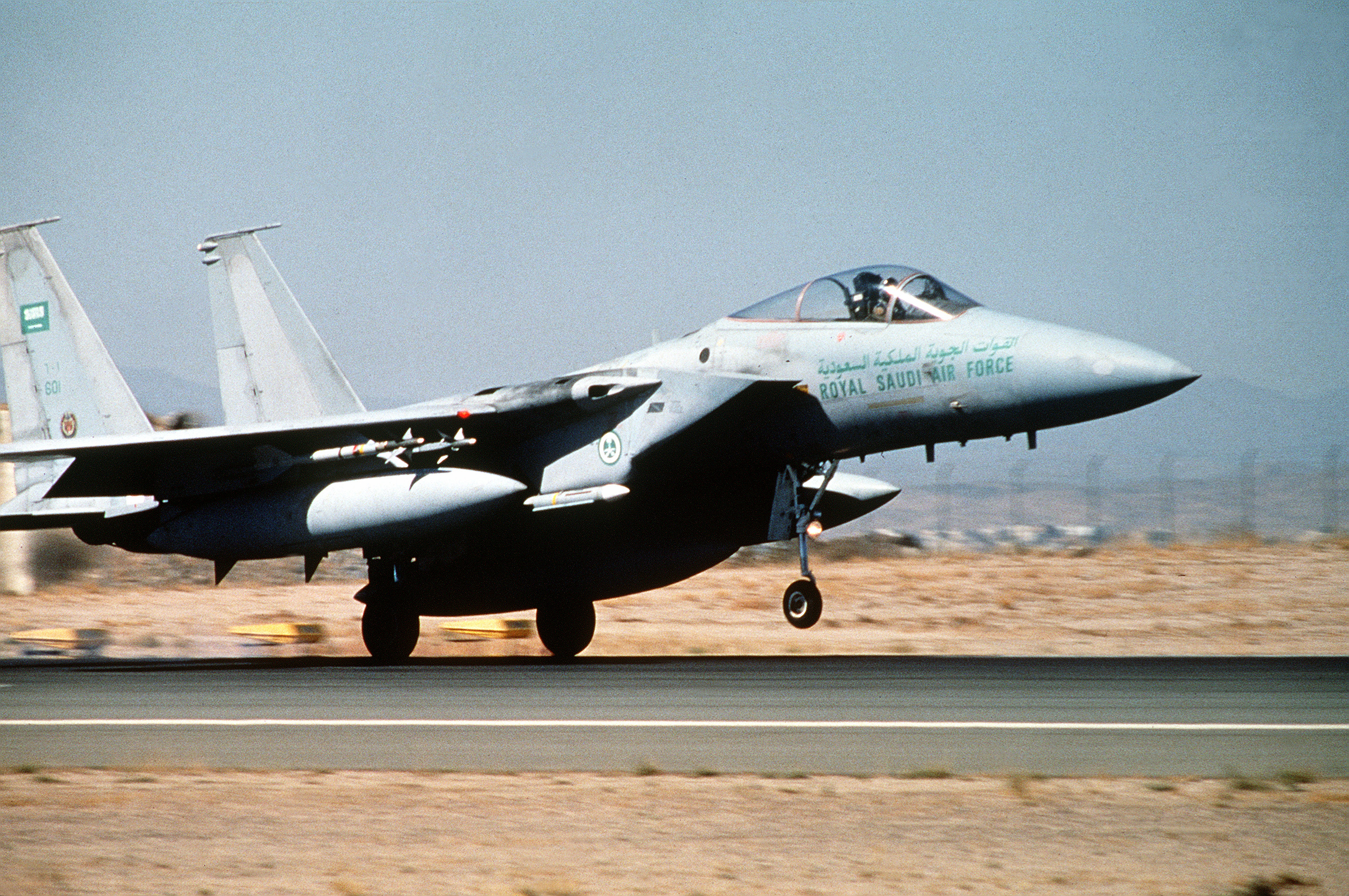
Date	5 June 1984
Location	Al-Arabiya Island, Saudi Arabia
Result	Saudi victory

Belligerents
Saudi Arabia	Iran

Strength
(Saudi Arabia) 13 F-15 Eagles	(Iran) 13 F-4 Phantoms

Casualties and losses
None	2 F-4 Phantoms lost 2 pilots killed

On 5 June 1984, fighters of the Royal Saudi Air Force and the Islamic Republic of Iran Air Force clashed over the Saudi island of Al-Arabiya in the Persian Gulf, marking the first direct armed engagement between the two countries.

== Background ==
Saudi Arabia had been one of the Arab states backing Iraq during its war with Iran. Iranian Supreme Leader Ruhollah Khomeini threatened to attack Saudi Arabia and other Arab states supporting Iraq.

== Air battle ==
Two Iranian Air Force F-4 Phantoms from Bushehr Air Base, had intruded into Saudi airspace, setting up for an attack on oil tankers. The planes were tracked by a United States Air Force E-3 Sentry AEW&C aircraft, which directed two patrolling Saudi F-15 Eagles armed with AIM-9 Sidewinder missiles to intercept the Iranians.

The Saudis shot down one Iranian Phantom, killing 1st Lts Homayoun Hekmati and weapon systems officer Seyed Sirous Karimi. The second Iranian F-4 was damaged, and made an emergency landing at Kish Airport. The aircraft could not be repaired and was written off. This caused the Iranians to scramble 11 additional F-4s from Bushehr. The tense standoff reportedly lasted "several minutes" before the Iranian jets returned to their airbase.

In response, the Royal Saudi Air Force scrambled 11 additional F-15s. Seeing this, the Iranians backed down, and the Saudis returned to base.

== See also ==
- List of wars involving Saudi Arabia
