= Platyceps insulanus =

Conservation status
- Data Deficient (IUCN 3.1)

Scientific classification
- Kingdom: Animalia
- Phylum: Chordata
- Class: Reptilia
- Order: Squamata
- Suborder: Serpentes
- Family: Colubridae
- Genus: Platyceps
- Species: P. insulanus

Binomial name
- Platyceps insulanus Mertens, 1965
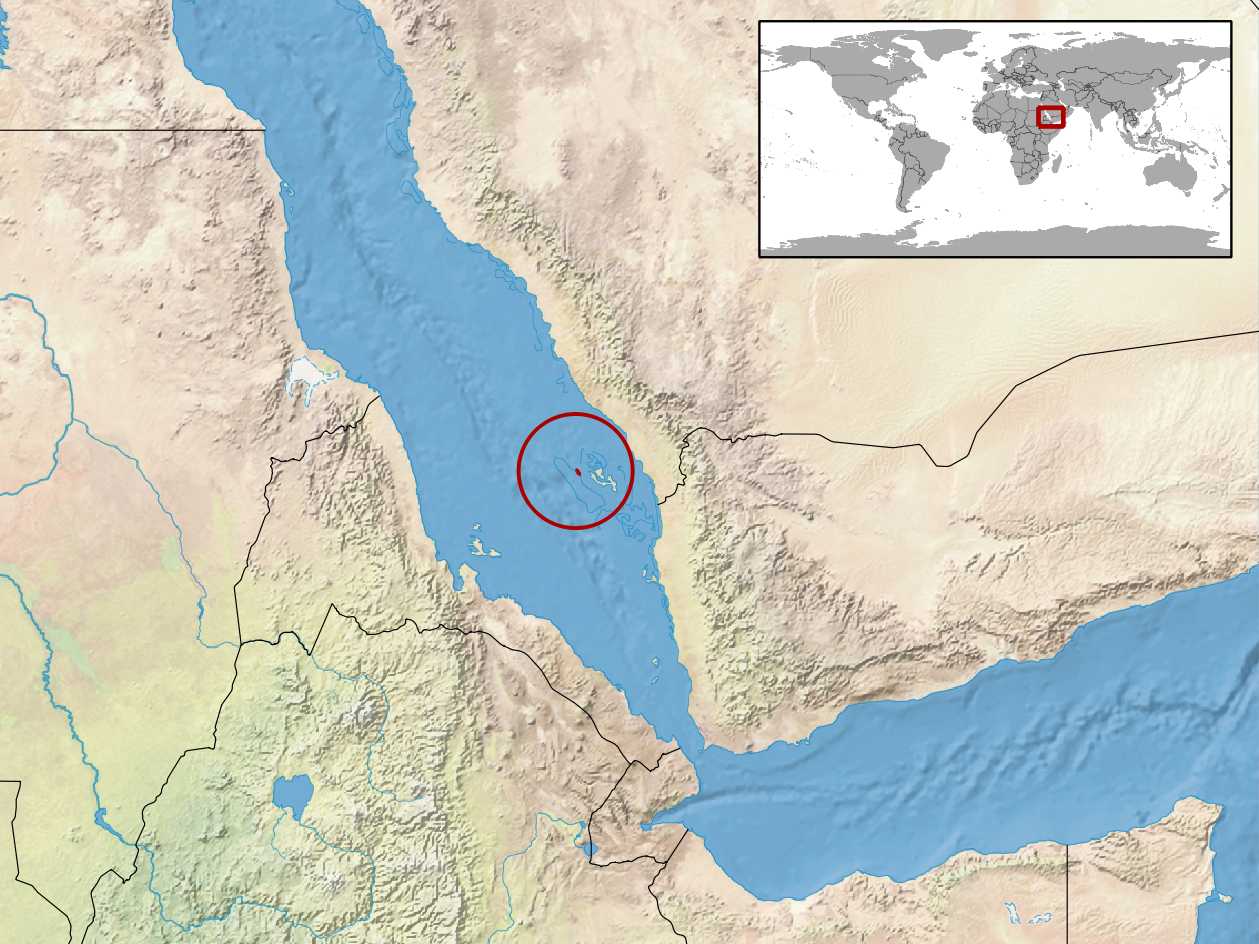

Species of snake

Platyceps insulanus is a species of snake in the family Colubridae. It is commonly known as the Sarso Island racer.

== Geographic range ==
The snake is found on Sarso Island in the Saudi Arabia.
