= Farasan (city) =

Farasan فرسان
- City
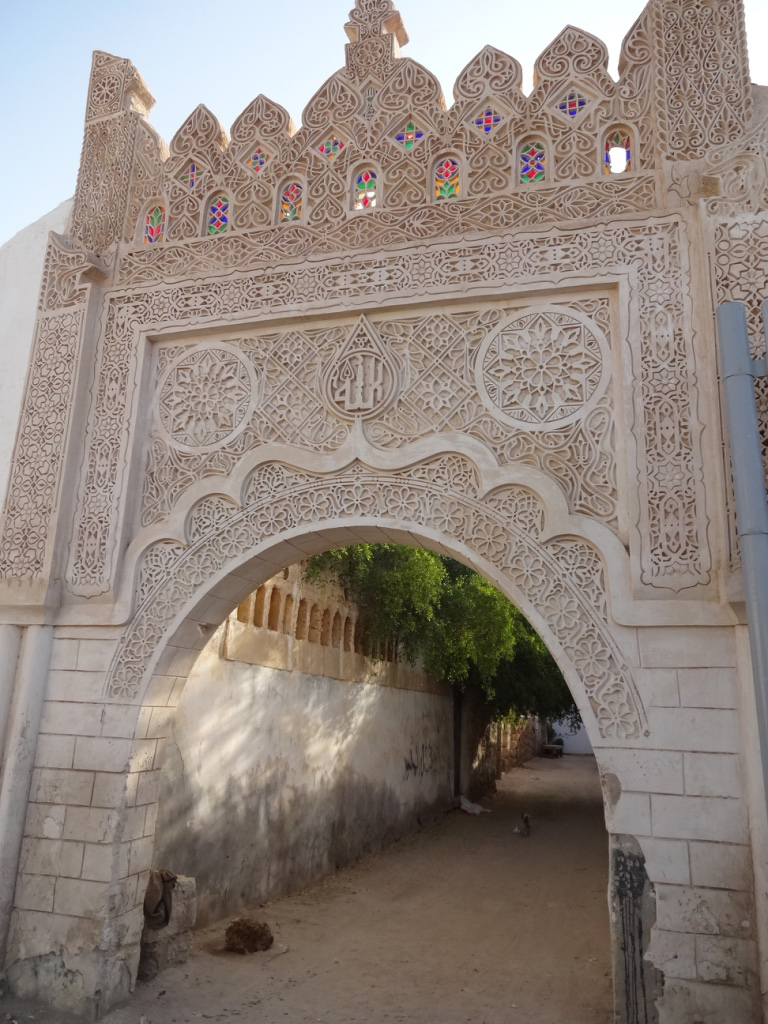
- Al-Rifa'i House

- Location within Saudi Arabia
- Coordinates: 16°42′8″N 42°7′6″E
- Country: Saudi Arabia
- Province: Jazan Province

Population (2022 census)
  - Total: 10.118
- Time zone: UTC+03:00 (SAST)
- Area code: 017

Farasan City (Arabic: فرسان) is the largest settlement and administrative center of the Farasan Islands and serves as the seat of the Farasan Governorate in the Jazan Province of Saudi Arabia. Located on the eastern coast of Greater Farasan Island, the largest island in the Farasan Archipelago, the city had a population of 10,118 as of 2022.

The historic core of the city contains numerous coral-stone buildings, some with elaborated stucco decoration. Others, less elaborate and of similar construction, survive in the quarter in a state of dereliction. The architectural style of these buildings recalls buildings in Zabid in Yemen.

== Al-Rifa'i House ==
The finest survivals of these decorated buildings is Al-Rifai House, built in 1922 by the pearl merchant Ahmad Munawwir Al-Rifa'I. The house is distinguished by its beautiful design and intricate carvings, reflecting the wealth of Farasan during the heyday of the pearl trade.

The house is built of coral stone. Its inner and outer walls are covered with geometric plaster decorations executed in the form of cornices and bands. The windows have decorative arches and recessed vaults. Inside, the sitting room is adorned with stucco decorations covering all four walls. The ceiling is wooden, carved with colourful geometric patterns and Quranic verses in its wooden friese.

The pearl merchant designed his house influenced by patterns of ancient Indian architecture. This style is particularly evident in the stucco carvings on its exterior walls.

== Al-Najdi Mosque ==
Al-Najdi Mosque, built in 1928 by a wealthy pearl merchant, is a coral stone construction covered in mortar. It has a minaret and 12 domes atop thick pillars. Above the main entrance, leading to the courtyard, there is plaster decoration in the form of a semi-circle. The mosque's architecture hints at the island's pearl trade links with India, from where the prayer hall's colourful wooden minbar and mihrab came from.

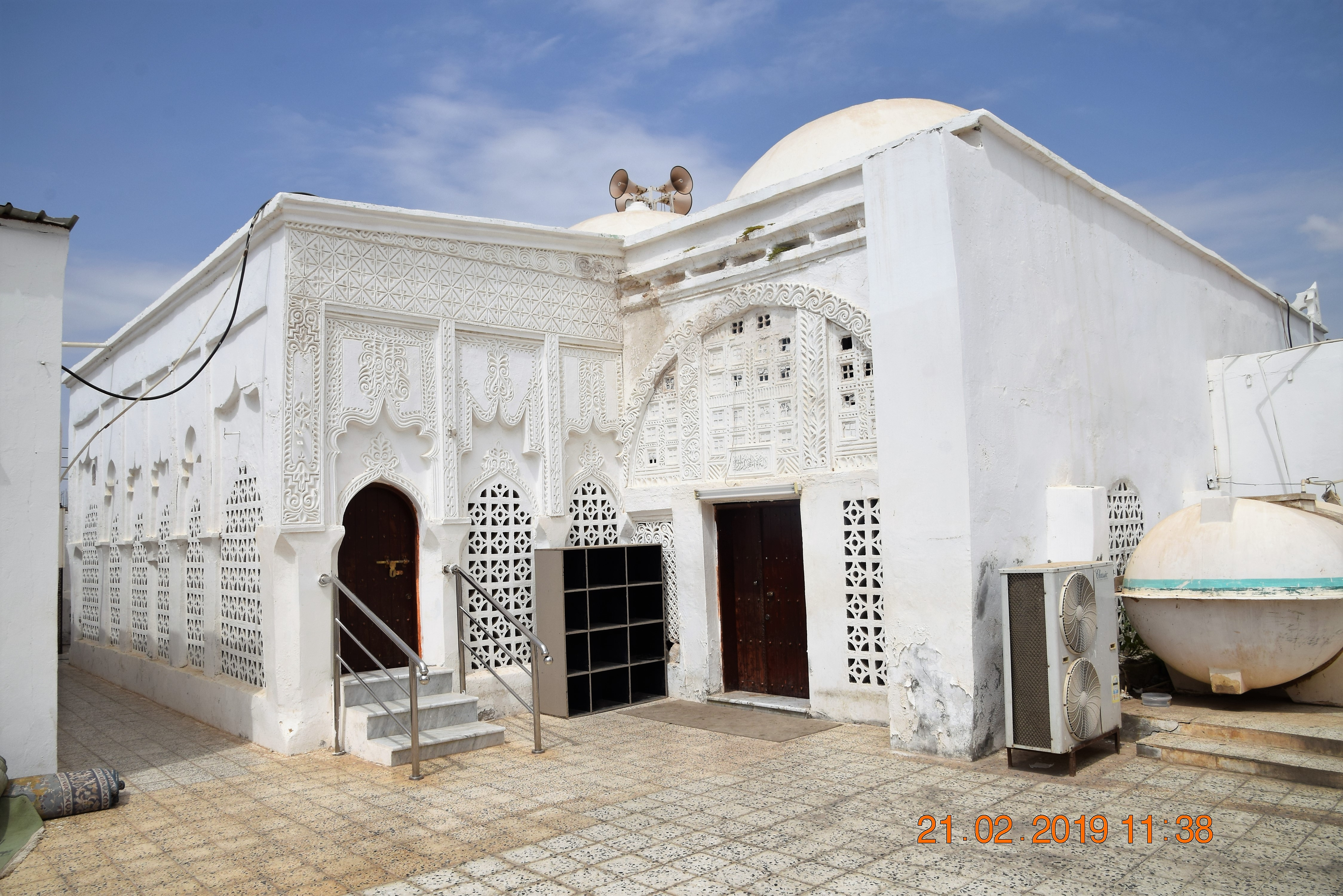
Al-Najdi Mosque

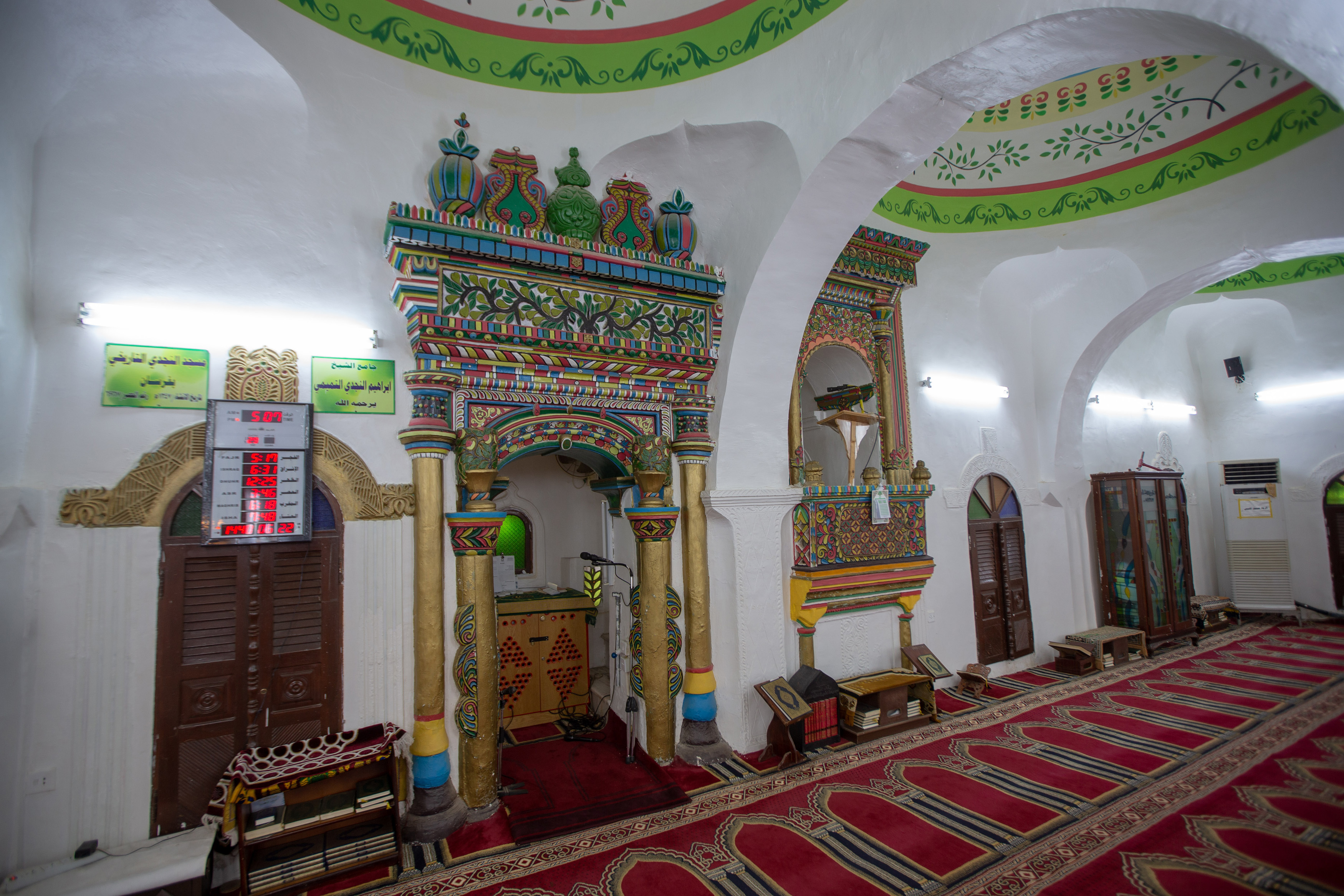
Al-Najdi Mosque

== Climate ==
Climate data for Farasan
Month	Jan	Feb	Mar	Apr	May	Jun	Jul	Aug	Sep	Oct	Nov	Dec	Year
Mean daily maximum °C (°F)	29.6 (85.3)	30.2 (86.4)	31.8 (89.2)	34.1 (93.4)	36.6 (97.9)	37.8 (100.0)	37.4 (99.3)	37.2 (99.0)	37.0 (98.6)	35.9 (96.6)	33.1 (91.6)	30.9 (87.6)	34.3 (93.7)
Mean daily minimum °C (°F)	22.3 (72.1)	21.9 (71.4)	23.5 (74.3)	24.8 (76.6)	26.9 (80.4)	28.6 (83.5)	29.1 (84.4)	29.0 (84.2)	27.8 (82.0)	25.9 (78.6)	23.9 (75.0)	21.7 (71.1)	25.5 (77.8)
Average precipitation mm (inches)	16 (0.6)	8 (0.3)	7 (0.3)	7 (0.3)	7 (0.3)	1 (0.0)	8 (0.3)	18 (0.7)	6 (0.2)	10 (0.4)	15 (0.6)	17 (0.7)	120 (4.7)
Source: Climate-data.org

== See also ==
- Provinces of Saudi Arabia
- List of islands of Saudi Arabia
- List of governorates of Saudi Arabia
- List of cities and towns in Saudi Arabia
