= Qummah Island =

Island in Saudi Arabia

Native name: جزيرة قماح
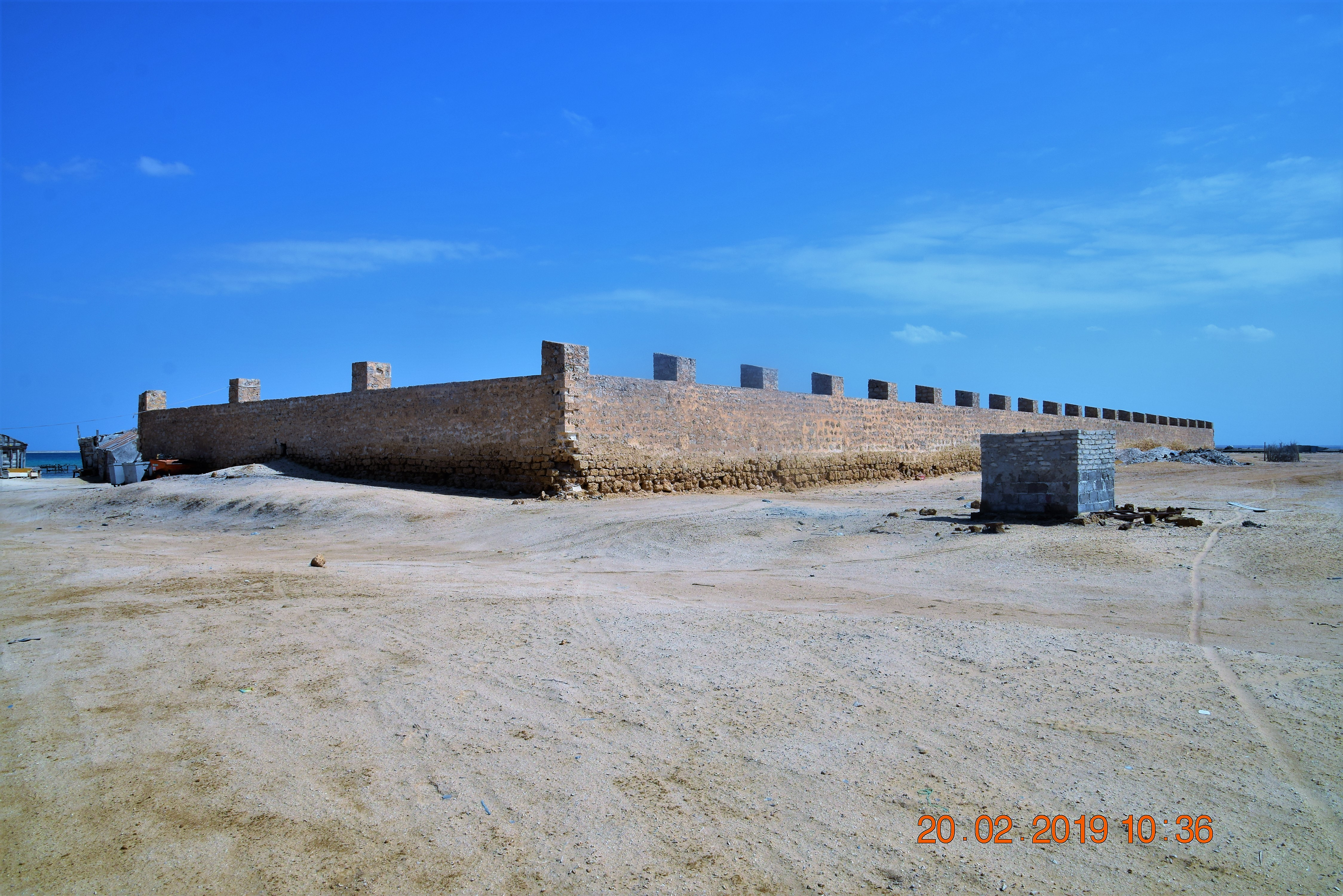
- Bait al-Jarmal

- Location within Saudi Arabia

Geography
- Location: Red Sea, Saudi Arabia
- Coordinates: 16°38′0″N 42°1′6″E
- Archipelago: Farasan Islands
- Adjacent to: Red Sea
- Area: 16 km^{2} (6.2 sq mi)

Administration
- Saudi Arabia
- Jazan Province

Demographics
- Population: 0

Additional information
- Time zone: SAST (UTC+03:00)
- Area code: 017

Qummah Island is an inhabited coral island off the south-western coast of Saudi Arabia. It is part of the Farasan Islands archipelago, located in the southern Red Sea and southwest of Great Farasan Island. The island is characterized by flat, low-lying plains with limited plant growth due to aridity and poor soils. It extends 6.2 km from north to south, 5.1 km from east to west, and covers an area of 16.2 km^{2}.

== Bait al-Jarmal ==
The island is home to the remains of Bait al-Jarmal, a Fuelling station built by the Imperial German Navy in 1901 to supply ships crossing to the Red Sea. However, the building was never completed, as the German Empire abandoned in 1902 its plan to seize the islands from the Ottoman Empire. The rectangular building is 107 m long, 34 m wide and 4 m high.

== See also ==
- Provinces of Saudi Arabia
- List of islands of Saudi Arabia
- List of governorates of Saudi Arabia
- List of cities and towns in Saudi Arabia
