= Sajid Island =

Island in Saudi Arabia

Native name: جزيرة السقيد
- Location within Saudi Arabia

Geography
- Location: Red Sea, Saudi Arabia
- Coordinates: 16°52′40″N 41°54′4″E
- Archipelago: Farasan Islands
- Adjacent to: Red Sea
- Area: 156 km^{2} (60 sq mi)

Administration
- Saudi Arabia
- Jazan Province

Demographics
- Population: 0

Additional information
- Time zone: SAST (UTC+03:00)
- Area code: 017

Sajid Island or Segid Island is an inhabited coral island off the south-western coast of Saudi Arabia. It is part of the Farasan Islands archipelago, located in the southern Red Sea. It is the second-largest island in the archipelago after Greater Farasan. Both islands are connected by a bridge. 24 km long and 12 km wide, the island covers an area of 156.0 km^{2} and its shoreline is 82.7 km.

Natural features include coastal mangrove fringes dominated by Avicennia marina, and coral reefs.

== See also ==
- Provinces of Saudi Arabia
- List of islands of Saudi Arabia
- List of governorates of Saudi Arabia
- List of cities and towns in Saudi Arabia
