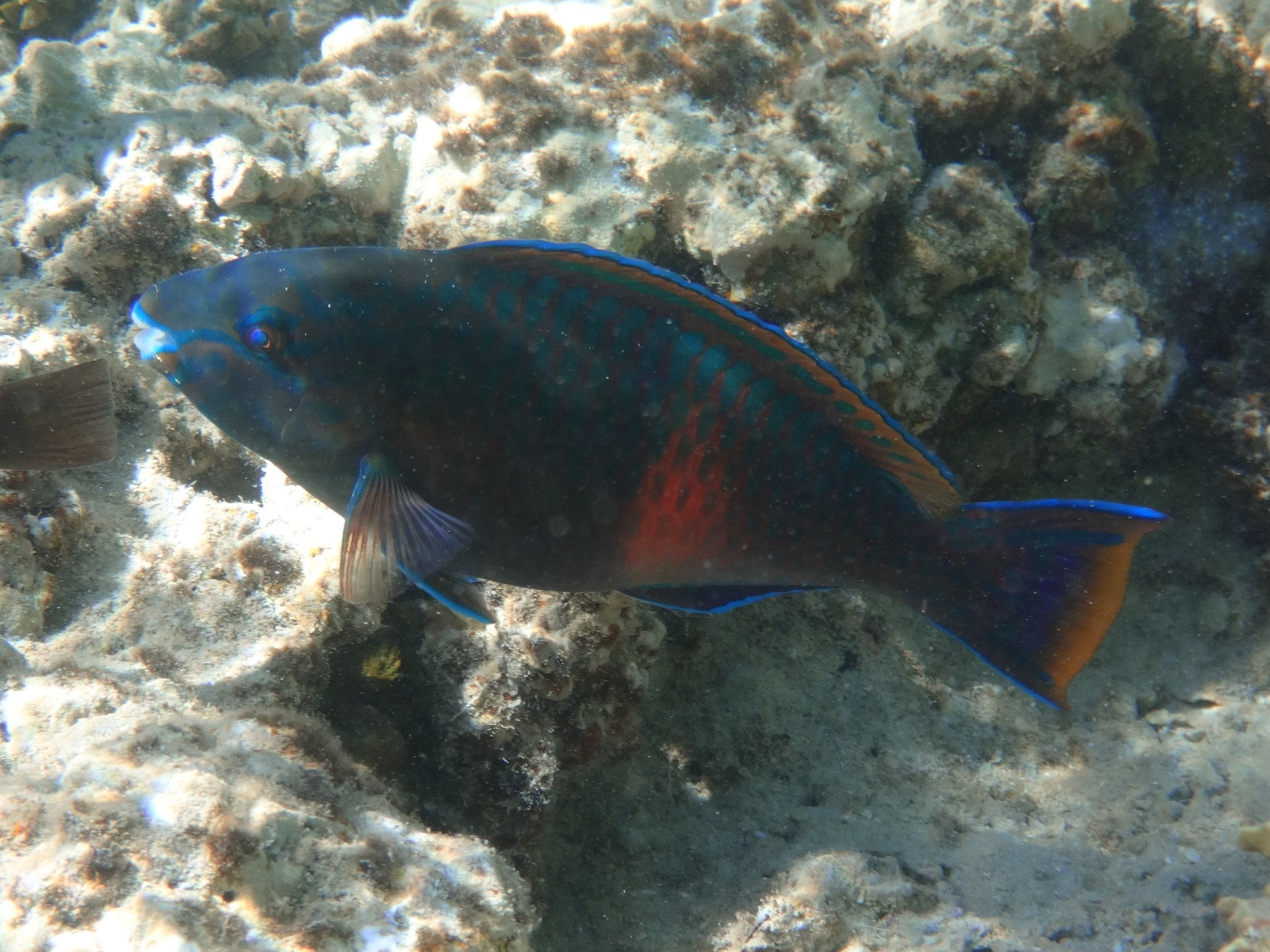
- In the Red Sea

Conservation status
- Least Concern (IUCN 3.1)

Scientific classification
- Kingdom: Animalia
- Phylum: Chordata
- Class: Actinopterygii
- Division: Teleostei
- Order: Labriformes
- Family: Labridae
- Genus: Scarus
- Species: S. fuscopurpureus

Binomial name
- Scarus fuscopurpureus (Klunzinger, 1871)

Synonyms
- Pseudoscarus forskalii fuscopurpureus Klunzinger, 1871

= Scarus fuscopurpureus =

Species of fish

Scarus fuscopurpureus, common name purple-brown parrotfish, is a species of marine ray-finned fish. This species of parrotfish occurs in the western Indian Ocean, the Red Sea, the Gulf of Aden and the Persian Gulf.

== Taxonomy ==
Scarus fuscopurpureus was first formally described as Pseudoscarus forskalii fuscopurpureus in 1871 by the German physician and zoologist Carl Benjamin Klunzinger (1834-1914), with the type locality given as Al-Qusair, Red Sea Governorate, Egypt.

== Distribution ==
Countries in which this species can be found include Bahrain, Djibouti, Egypt, Eritrea, Yemen, Israel, Jordan, Iran, Qatar, United Arab Emirates, Oman, Saudi Arabia, Somalia and Sudan.

== Description ==
Terminal phase males may typically range from 34–41 cm (13–16 in). Colors of these fishes depend on sexes and stage of growth. The dorsal, anal, and caudal fins are deep brown and purple. Initial phase fish show drab purple or brown colouration with light bands, with reddish edges of scales and a truncate to emarginated caudal fin. Terminal phase fish often have a pale (pink or yellow) vertical band on the side, below the soft dorsal, as well as a yellow-edged lunate tail.

== Habitat ==
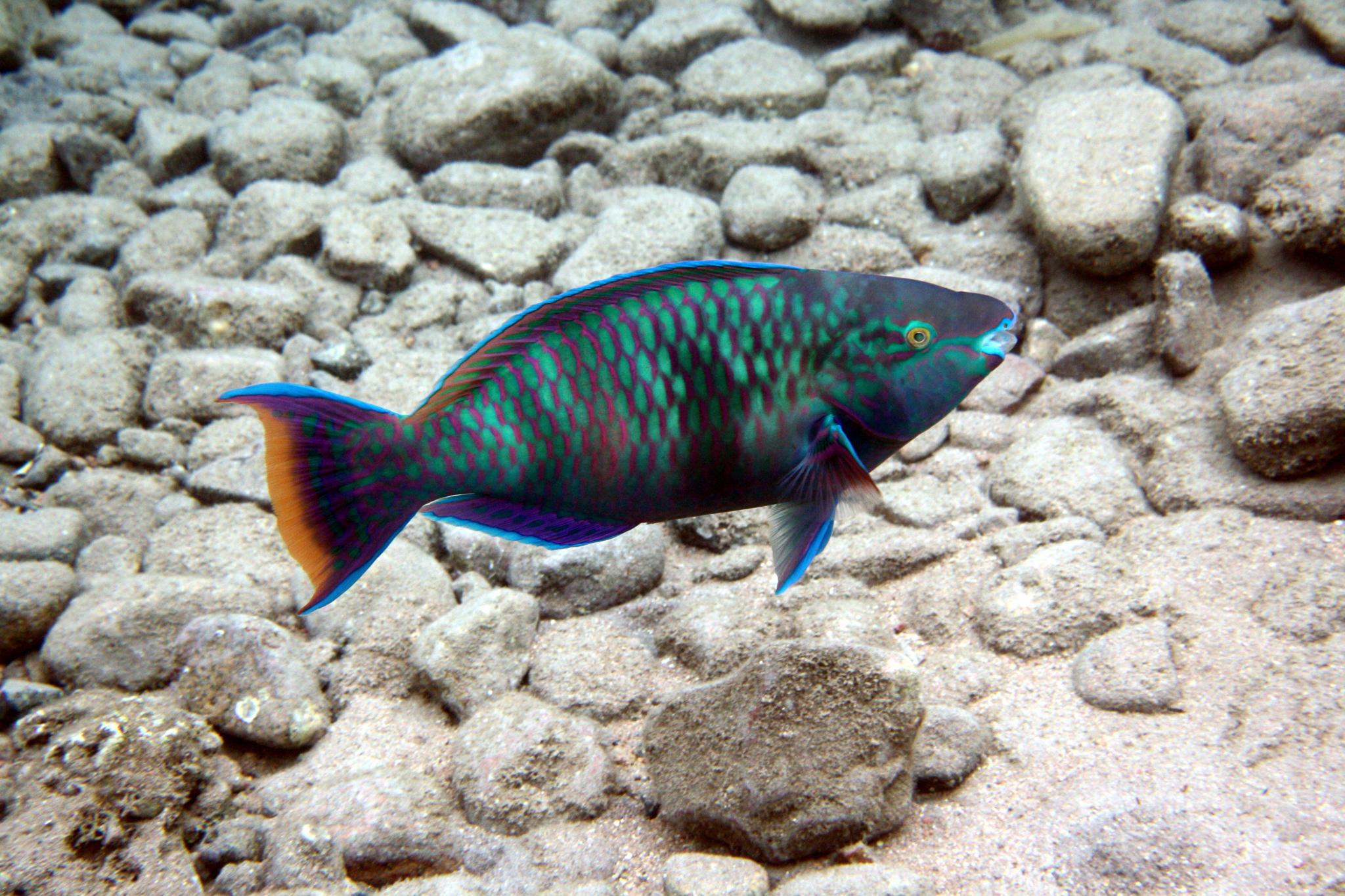
In the Red Sea

This reef-associated species inhabits shallow water, at a depth of 2–20 m (6 ft 7 in – 65 ft 7 in), often over sand with coral heads and abundant vegetation.

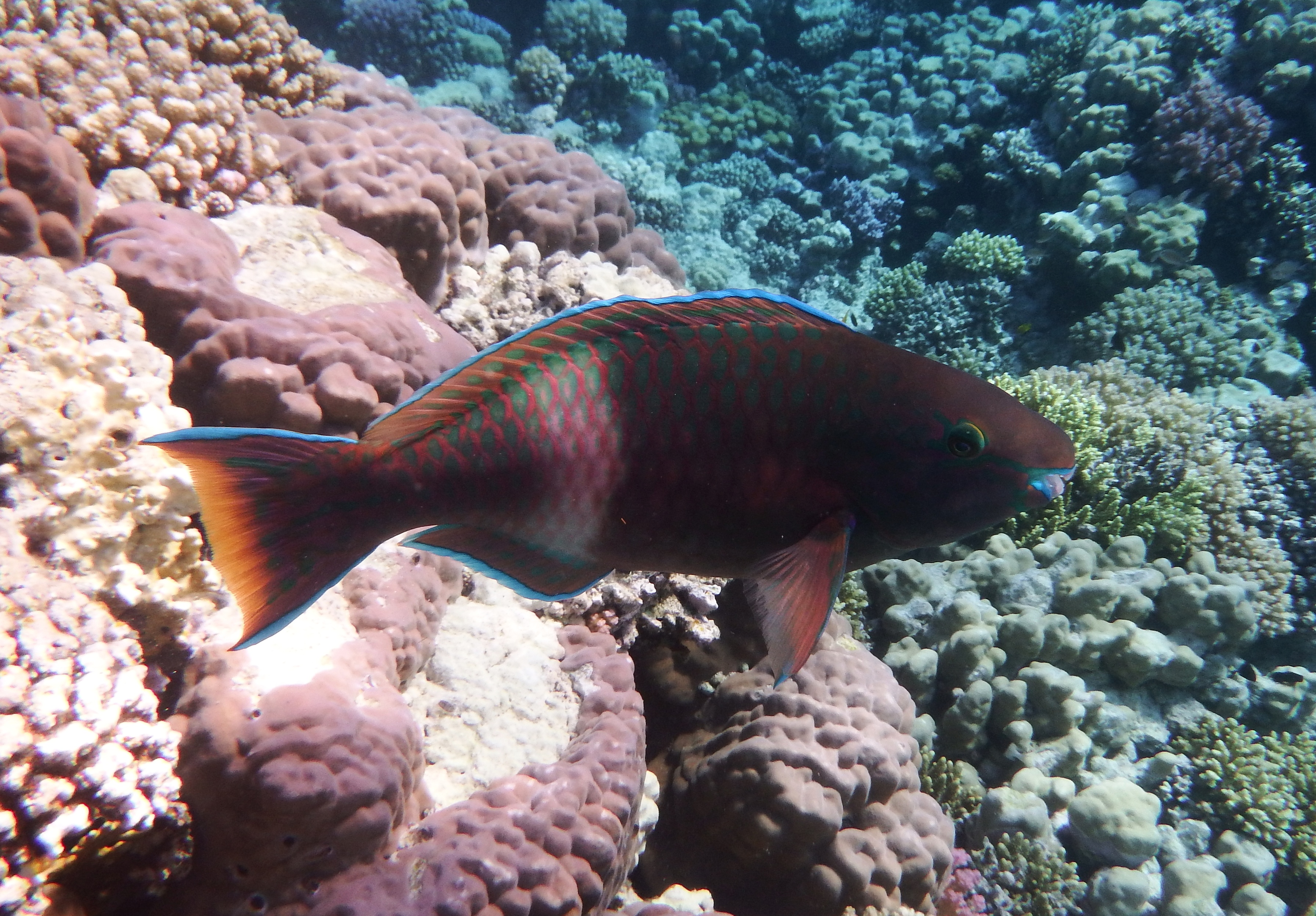
In the Red Sea

== Reproduction ==
Scarus fuscopurpureus is oviparous and the male and female form pairs for spawning. They can be usually found in pairs or small groups. Like many but not all other species of parrotfish, the purple-brown parrotfish also exhibits different colour phases based on sex and life stage.

== Behavior ==
S. fuscopurpureus exhibits diel vertical patterns in which they stay at greater depths at night to sleep, while staying in shallower waters during the day to feed.

== Feeding ==
S. fuscopurpureus, like other parrotfishes, use their strong jaws and teeth to rasp at algae on coral.

== Bibliography ==
- Fenner, Robert M. (2001). The Conscientious Marine Aquarist. Neptune City, USA: T.F.H. Publications.
- Helfman, G.; B. Collette; D. Facey (1997). The diversity of fishes. Malden, Massachusetts, USA: Blackwell Science.
- Hoese, D.F. (1986). A M.M. Smith; P.C. Heemstra (eds.). Smiths' sea fishes. Berlín, Germany: Springer-Verlag.
- Maugé, L.A. (1986). A J. Daget; J.-P. Gosse; D.F.E. Thys van den Audenaerde (eds.). Check-list of the freshwater fishes of Africa (CLOFFA). Vol. 2. ISNB Brusxelles; MRAC, Tervuren, Flandes; & ORSTOM, París, France.
- Moyle, P.; J. Cech (2000). Fishes: An Introduction to Ichthyology (4th ed.). Upper Saddle River, USA: Prentice-Hall.
- Nelson, Joseph S.; Grande, Terry C.; Wilson, Mark V. H. (2016). Fishes of the World (5th ed.). Hoboken: John Wiley and Sons. doi:10.1002/9781119174844. ISBN 978-1-118-34233-6.
- Wheeler, A. (1985). The World Encyclopedia of Fishes (2nd ed.). London: Macdonald.
