= Dumsuk Island =

Island in Saudi Arabia

Native name: جزيرة دمسك
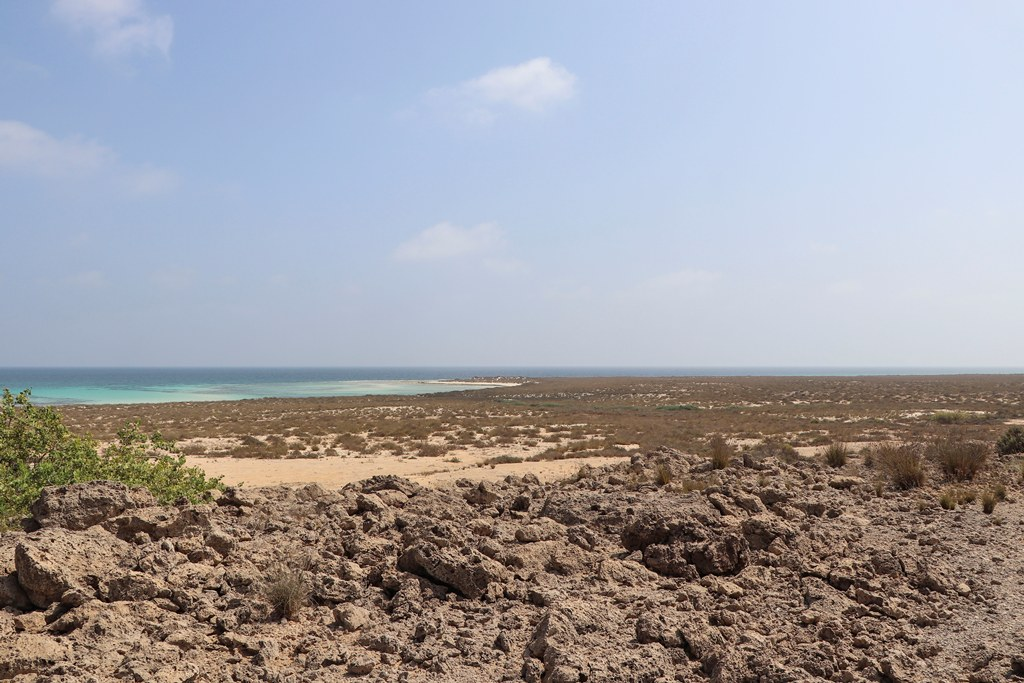

- Location within Saudi Arabia

Geography
- Location: Red Sea, Saudi Arabia
- Coordinates: 16°32′27″N 42°3′2″E
- Archipelago: Farasan Islands
- Adjacent to: Red Sea
- Area: 12 km^{2} (4.6 sq mi)

Administration
- Saudi Arabia
- Jazan Province

Demographics
- Population: 0

Additional information
- Time zone: SAST (UTC+03:00)
- Area code: 017

Dumsuk Island or Dumsuq Island is an uninhabited coral island off the south-western coast of Saudi Arabia. It is part of the Farasan Islands archipelago, located in the southern Red Sea and southwest of Great Farasan Island. The U-shaped island covers an area of 12 km^{2}.

The island is characterized by flat, low-lying plains with limited plant growth due to aridity and salty soils. However, some depressed areas with better moisture regime have dense stands of halophyte and tussocky shrub vegetation.

The French adventurer Henry de Monfreid settled on the island in 1916.
