= Saso Islands =

Islands in Saudi Arabia

Native name: جزر ساسوه
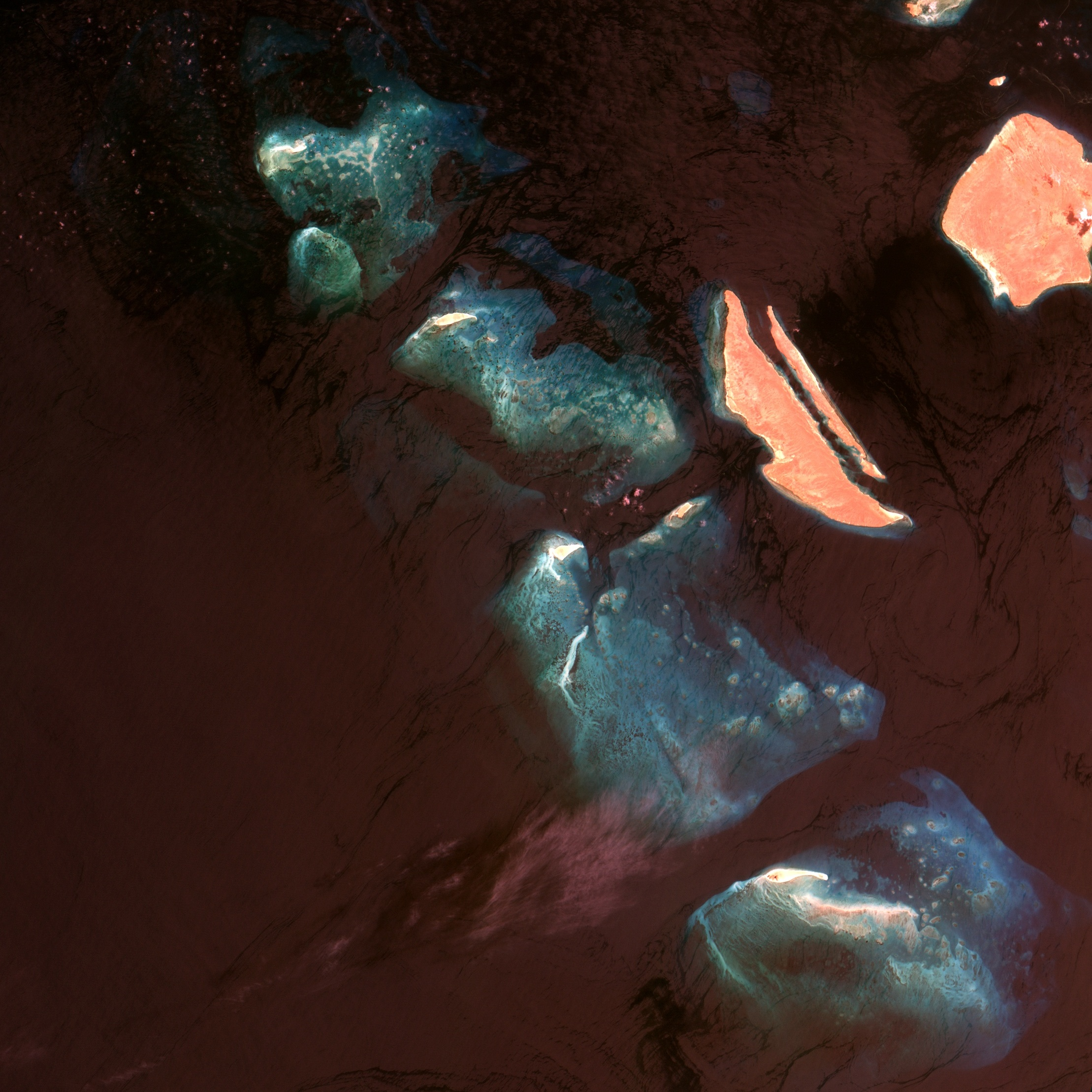
- Satellite picture of Saso Islands

- Location within Saudi Arabia

Geography
- Location: Red Sea, Saudi Arabia
- Coordinates: 16°54′0″N 41°42′0″E
- Archipelago: Farasan Islands
- Adjacent to: Red Sea
- Area: 22.6 km^{2} (8.7 sq mi)

Administration
- Saudi Arabia
- Jazan Province

Demographics
- Population: 0

Additional information
- Time zone: SAST (UTC+03:00)
- Area code: 017

Saso Islands or Sarso Islands or Western Sasuh and Eastern Sasuh Islands are two small, uninhabitated coral-derived islands off the south-western coast of Saudi Arabia. They are part of the Farasan Islands archipelago, located in the southern Red Sea. They are separated by a small north–south drending channel and the size of both islands is about 22.6 square kilometres (8.7 square miles).

== Description ==
Soils on the island are predominantly sandy and saline, derived from weathered coral limestone and aeolian deposits, with no permanent rivers or lakes present. Vegetation is sparse.

In the 15th century, Arab navigators utilized maritime routes in the southern Red Sea that passed to the west of Sarso Islands, serving as a landmark amid the Farasan archipelago's complex reef systems and channels.

== Endemic species ==
The islands are housing same endemic species: The Sarso Island racer (Platyceps insulanus), a rare snake and the crab E. azizi.
