= Farasan Islands =

Saudi Arabian archipelago in the Red Sea and a governorate of Jazan Province

Native name: جزر فرسان
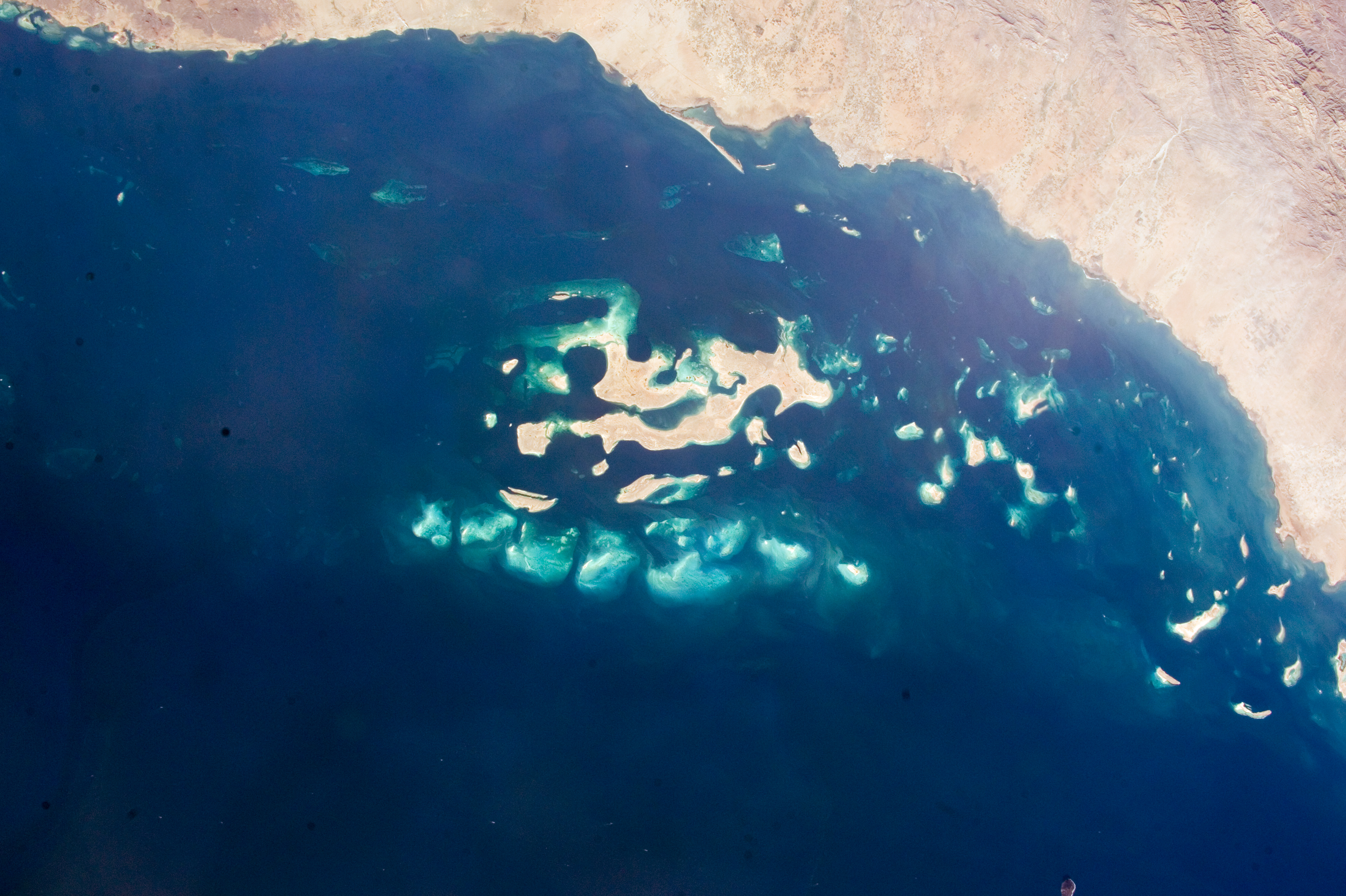
- Farasan Islands seen from the International Space Station

- Location within Saudi Arabia

Geography
- Coordinates: 16°48′00″N 41°51′00″E
- Type: Coral
- Total islands: 200
- Major islands: Farasan Island; Sajid Island; Qummah Island
- Area: 1,050 km^{2} (410 sq mi)

Administration
- Saudi Arabia
- Jazan Province
- Largest Island: Farasan Island

Demographics
- Population: 13,529 (2022)

Additional information
- Time zone: SAST (UTC+03:00)
- Area code: 017

Map of the Farasan archipelago off the coast of Jazan Province

The Farasan Islands, (Note: Arabic: جزر فرسان (romanized: Juzur Farasan)) are an archipelago in the Red Sea, located some 40 km (25 mi; 22 nmi) off the coast of Jizan. Most of the archipelago falls within Saudi Arabia, although its southern extension is Yemeni. The Islands have since Roman times constituted a stopping-off point for maritime activity and, at times, a base for naval forces in the southern Red Sea region.

Administratively, the islands form the Farasan Islands Governorate of Jazan Province. The governorate's capital is the city of Farasan, on Great Farasan Island.

The Islands Protected Area was designated a UNESCO Biosphere Reserve in 2021 and is included on Saudi Arabia's tentative list for World Heritage status.

== Geography ==
The Farasan Islands consist of nearly 200 islands and islets, most of which are coral islands, spread over a sea area of 1050 km^{2} in the southeastern section of the Red Sea. Only three islands are inhabited: Great Farasan, Sajid, and Qummah. The remaining islands are uninhabited and include the pairs Saso Islands and Al-Dassan Islands, as well as Kirah, Zifaf, Dumsuk, Salubah, and Dushak, among others.

The archipelago is low lying, reaching a maximum height of 70 m above sea leve on Great Farasan Island. It consists of fossil-coral plateaux, coral-sand dunes and plains. The largest islands of the archipelago, Greater Farasan and Sajid, are linked by a bridge. A ferry service connects the islands to the mainland.

== Heritage ==
Farasan City contains archaeological sites and monuments including an Ottoman castle, historical decorated stucco buildings such as Al-Rifa'i House and Al-Najdi Mosque as well as boulders with Himyarite inscriptions and historical wells in the nearby wadi Matar.

== History ==
In the 1st century CE, the islands were known as Portus Ferresanus. A Latin inscription dating from 144 CE, found on Great Farasan Island, points to a Roman naval and military presence on the islands. It is believed that the islands may have been attached to the Roman province of Arabia Felix, before being transferred to Aegyptus some time before 144 CE. This fact would make the Farasan Islands the farthest Roman outpost (until at least the 3rd century), being nearly 4,000 km (2,500 mi) from Rome itself. In addition, recent studies have found that the local language has some Latin loanwords. It remained this way up until the Arab Muslim conquest of the islands and subsequent Islamization.

The late medieval seafarer Ahmad ibn Majid gives evidence of availability of water, food and anchorages as well as routes past and around the archipelago. Egyptian Mamluks occupied the islands in the early 16th century, and the Ottomans at the beginning of the 20th century. The latter permitted the establishment of a German coaling station on Qummah Island.

In 1915, the Idrisids captured the islands from the Ottomans. In 1930, the islands were practically annexed by the Saudi State, confirmed by the Treaty of Taif in 1934.

Following their absorption into Saudi Arabia, the islands suffered economically from the collapse of the - already in medieval times attested - pearling industry in the 1930s and 1940s, but revived with the development of the country’s oil economy in later decades and tourism recently.

== Climate ==
The climate in the Farasan Islands is characterized by a long hot season (April–October) and a short mild one (November–March). In the long dry period, high temperatures are usually dominant. The mean annual temperature is 30 °C (86 °F; 303 K). Furthermore, the mean relative humidity in winter ranges from 70% to 80% and in summer between 65% and 78%. The highest rainfall occurs in April and the precipitation is generally unpredictable in the southern part of Red Sea.

Climate data for Farasan Islands
Month	Jan	Feb	Mar	Apr	May	Jun	Jul	Aug	Sep	Oct	Nov	Dec	Year
Mean daily maximum °C (°F)	30 (86)	31 (88)	33 (91)	35 (95)	37 (99)	39 (102)	40 (104)	39 (102)	38 (100)	36 (97)	34 (93)	31 (88)	35 (95)
Daily mean °C (°F)	25.5 (77.9)	26.5 (79.7)	28 (82)	30 (86)	32 (90)	34 (93)	35 (95)	34 (93)	33 (91)	30.5 (86.9)	28.5 (83.3)	26.5 (79.7)	30.3 (86.5)
Mean daily minimum °C (°F)	21 (70)	22 (72)	23 (73)	25 (77)	27 (81)	29 (84)	30 (86)	29 (84)	28 (82)	25 (77)	23 (73)	22 (72)	25 (78)
Source: Weather2Travel – Farasan Islands Climate

== Nature ==
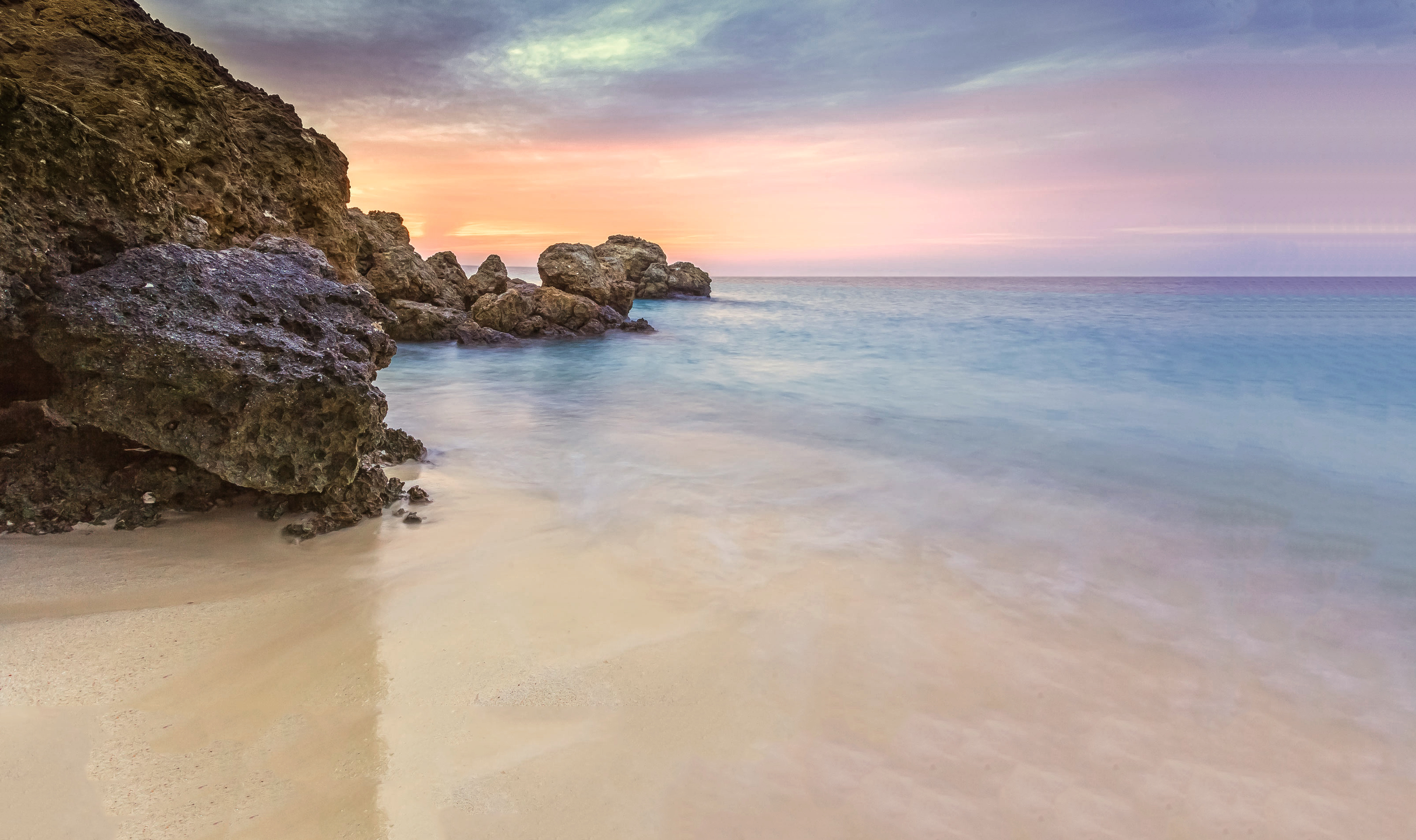
Beach in Farasan Islands

The Farasan Island Marine Reserve is a protected area. It is home to the Arabian gazelle, and, in winter, migratory birds from Europe.

Oceanic animals include manta rays, whale sharks, and several species of sea turtles including endangered and critically endangered green and hawksbill turtles, dugongs, and several species of dolphins and whales with occasional visits by others such as orcas.

== Economy ==
After a French engineer investigated petroleum seeps on the islands in 1912, a 75-year concession was granted to the Red Sea oilfields. At the time, the Farasan Islands supported a small fishing industry.

== Gallery ==
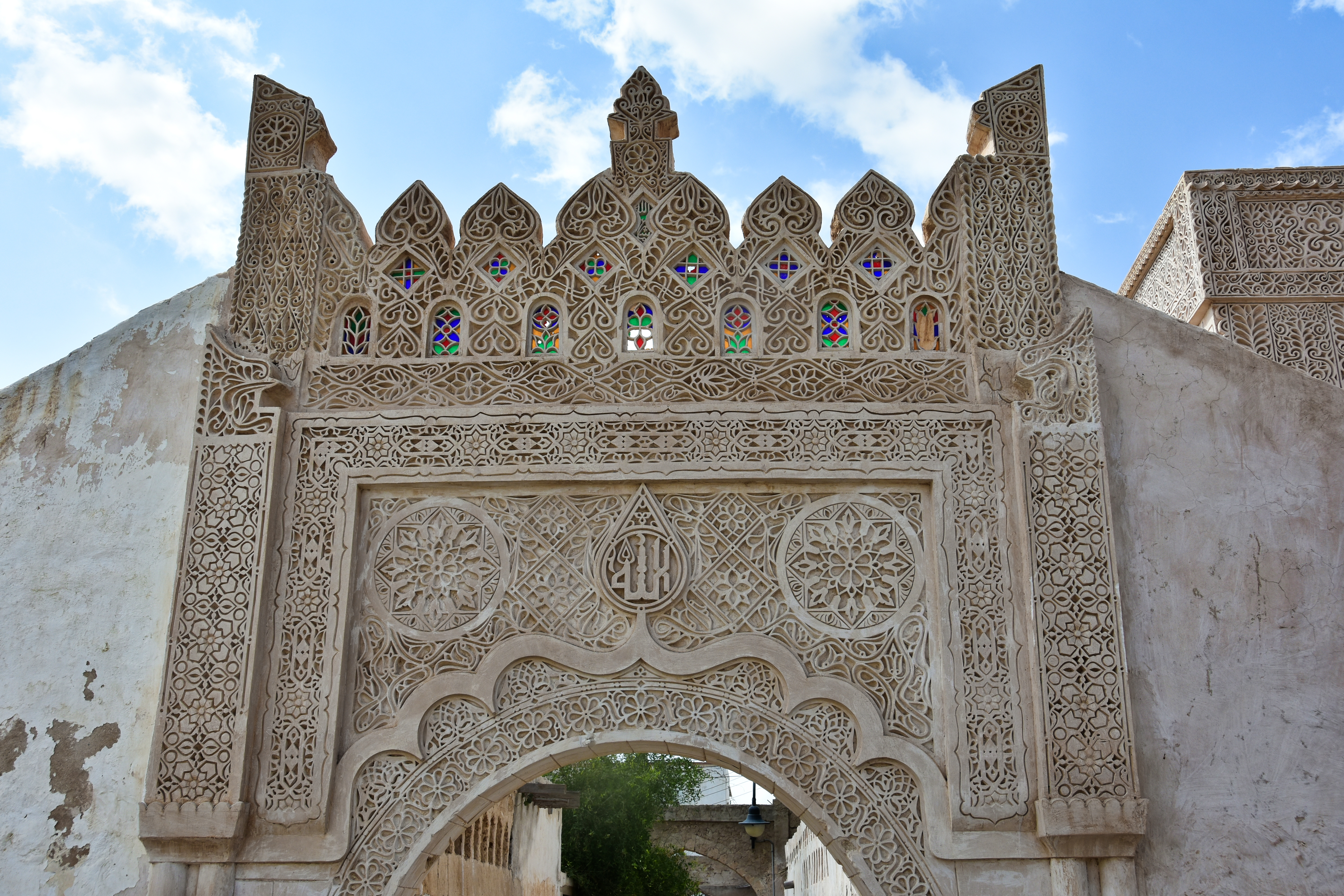
Al-Rifai House built in traditional Farasani architecture

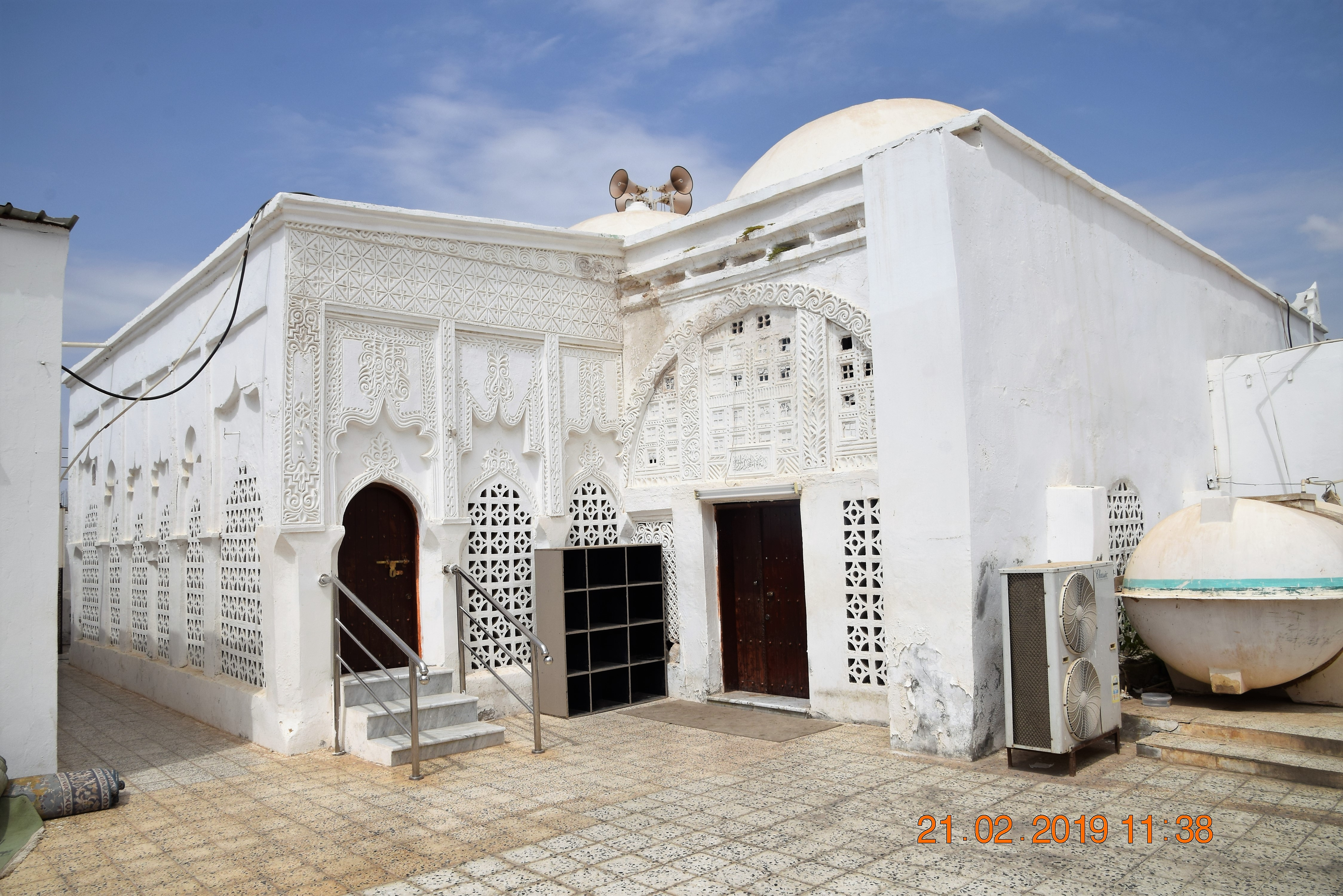
Al-Najdi Mosque in Farsan City

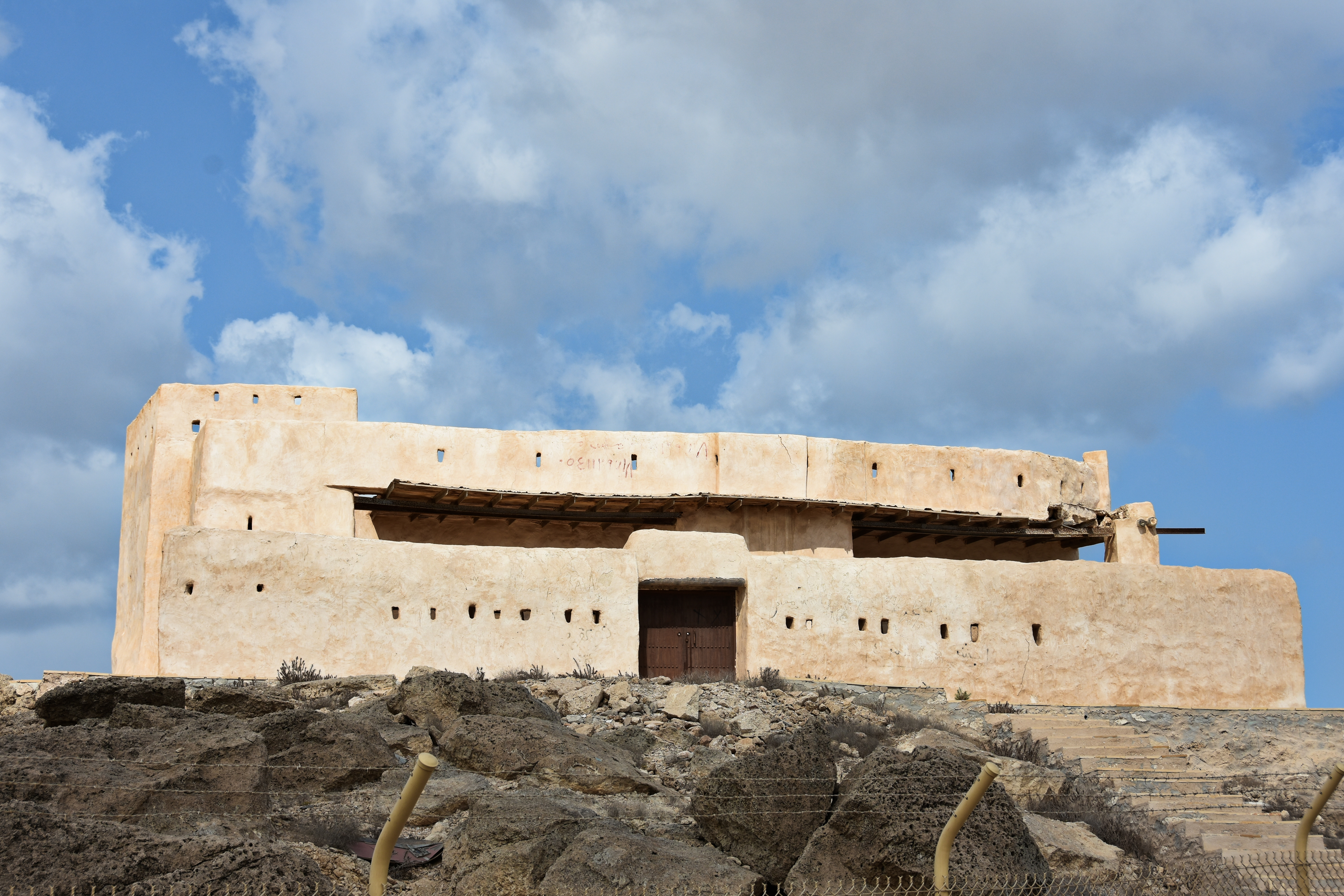
Ottoman fort on Great Farasan Island

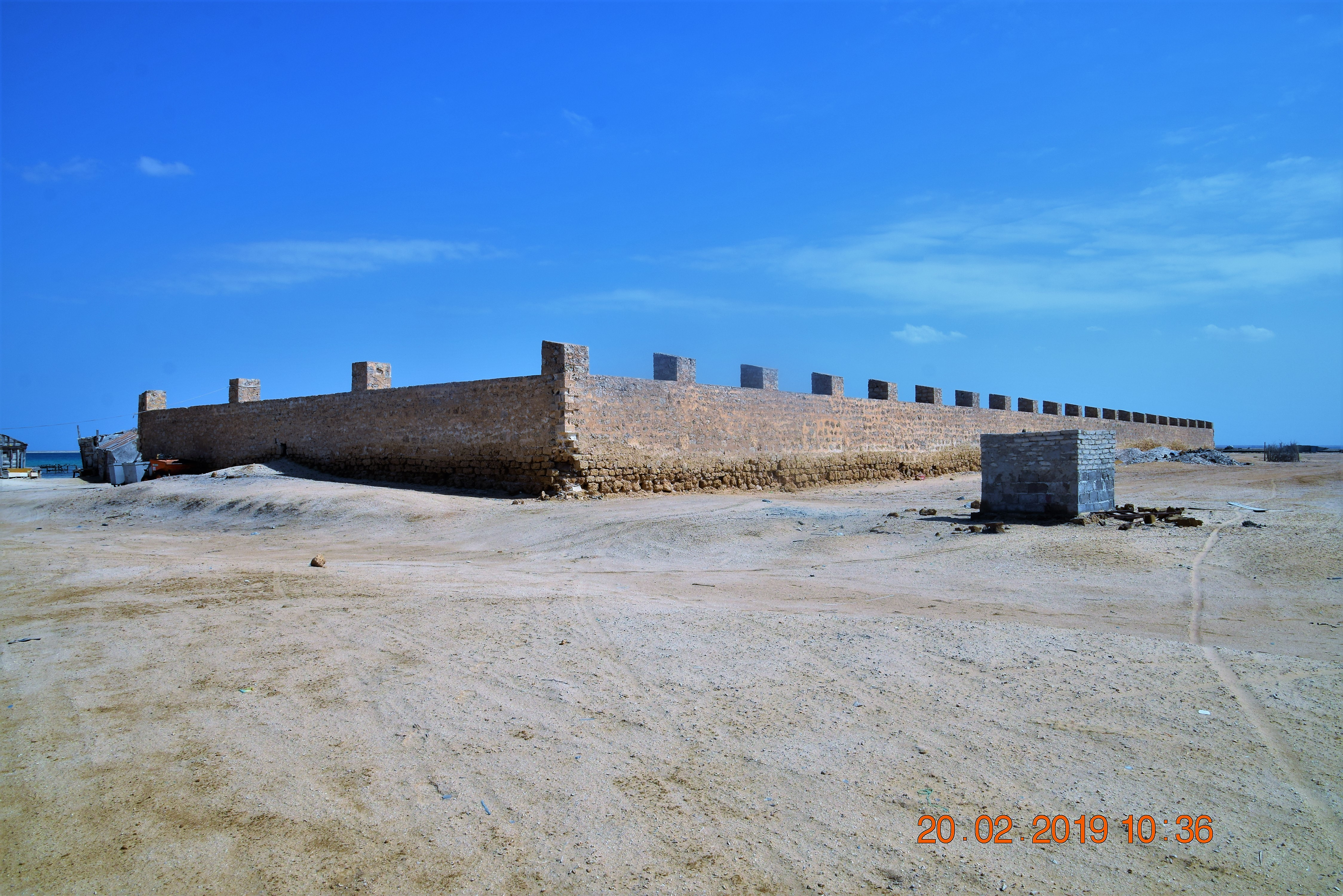
Bait al-Jarmal on Qummah Island

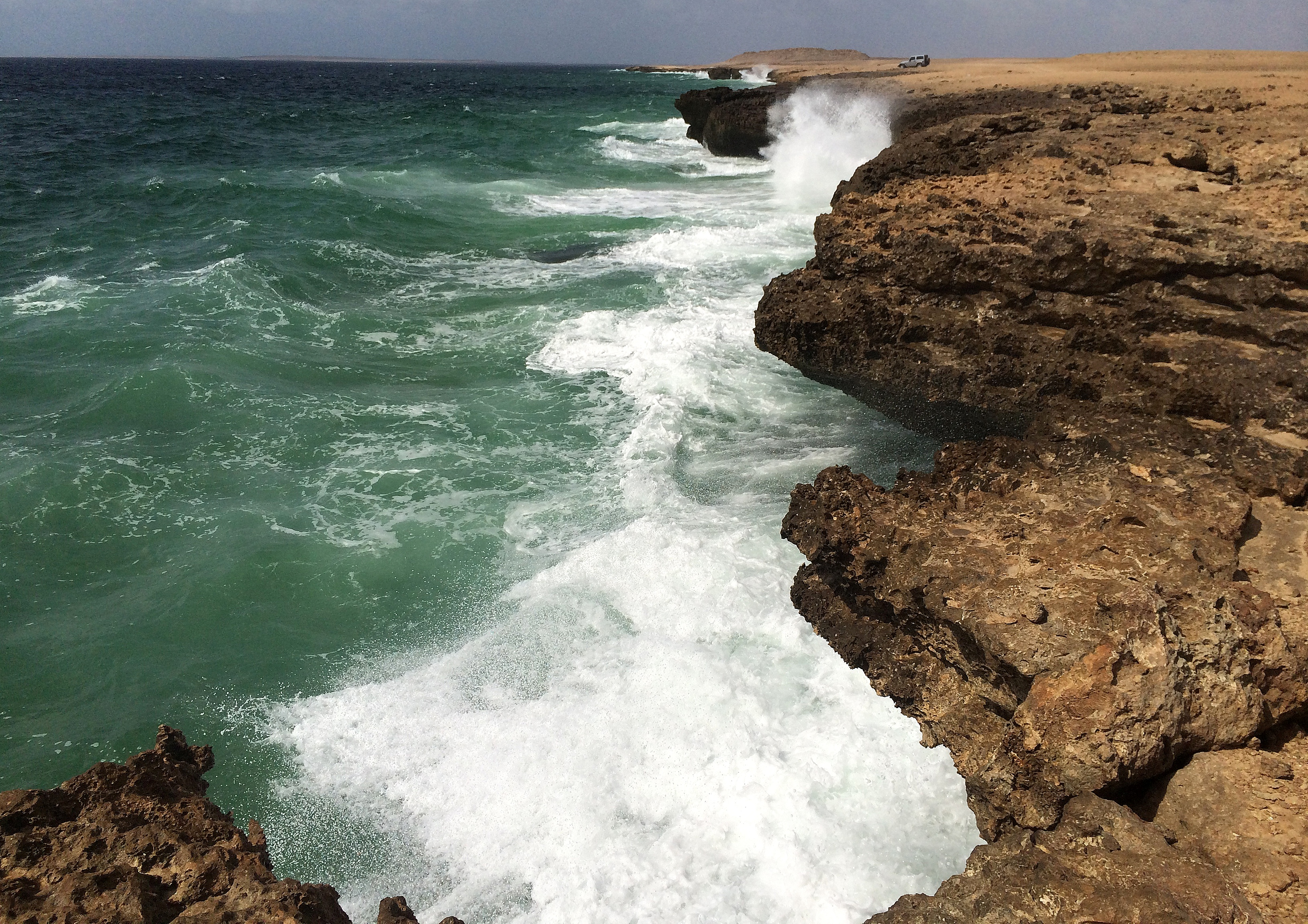
Ras Shada in Farasan Islands

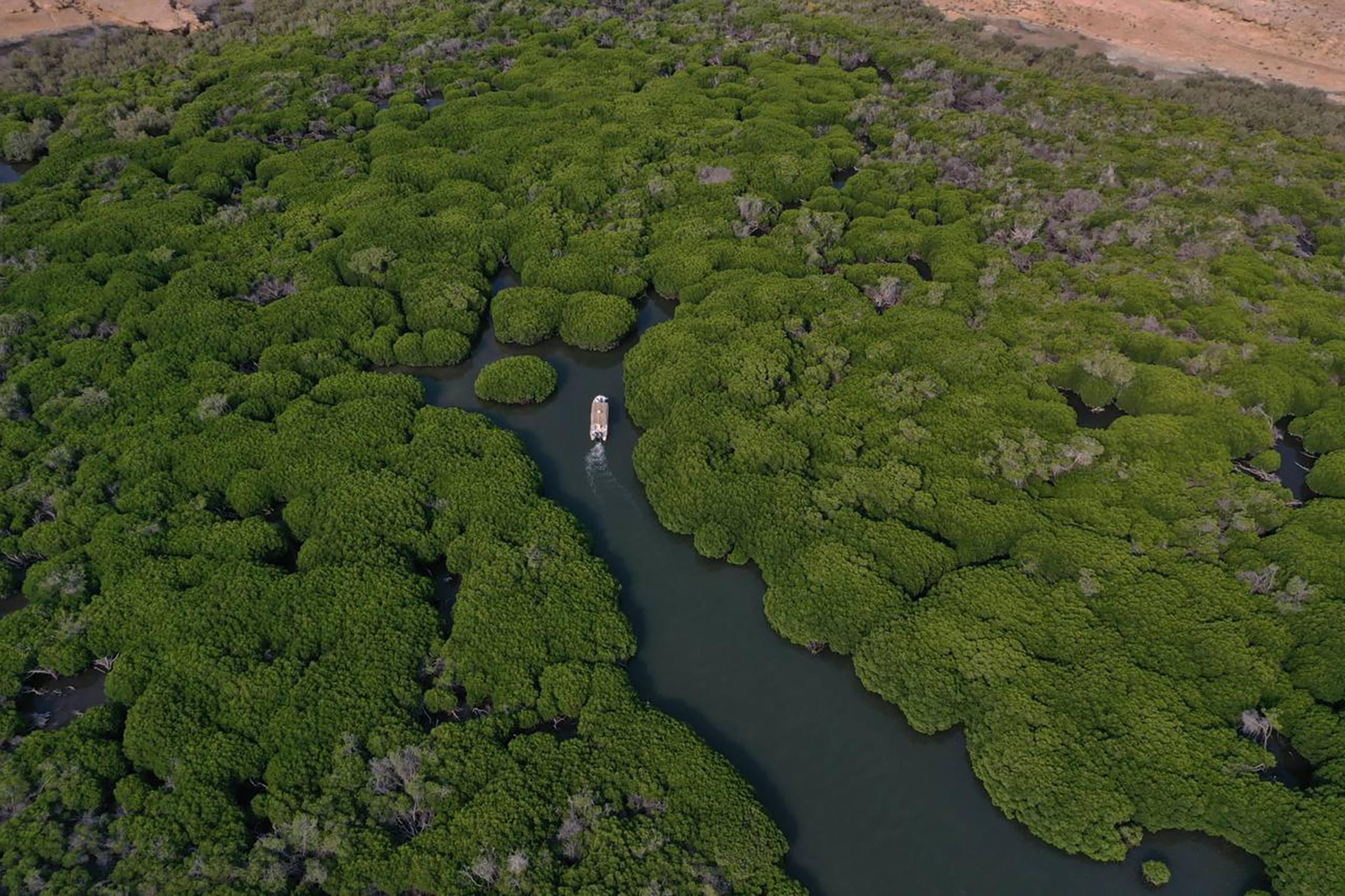
Al-Qandal Forest, Great Farasan Island

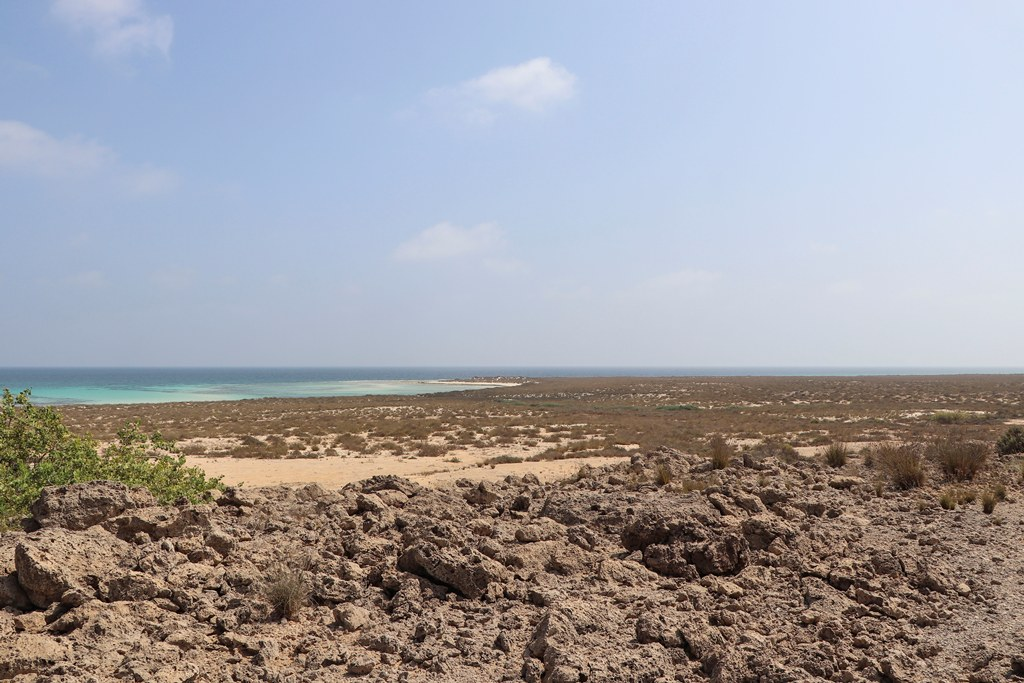
Dumsuk Island

== See also ==
- Provinces of Saudi Arabia
- List of islands of Saudi Arabia
- List of governorates of Saudi Arabia
- List of cities and towns in Saudi Arabia
