= Farasan Island =

Saudi Arabian island in the Red Sea

Native name: جزيرة فرسان
- Location within Saudi Arabia

Geography
- Location: Red Sea, Saudi Arabia
- Coordinates: 16°42′21″N 41°59′0″E
- Archipelago: Farasan Islands
- Adjacent to: Red Sea
- Area: 380 km^{2} (150 sq mi)

Administration
- Saudi Arabia
- Jazan Province

Demographics
- Population: 20,000 (2010)

Additional information
- Time zone: SAST (UTC+03:00)
- Area code: 017

Farasan Island, (Note: Arabic: جزيرة فرسان (romanized: Jazīrat Farasān)) also known as Great Farasan Island, (Note: Arabic: جزيرة فرسان الكبرى (romanized: Jazīrat Farasān al-Kubrā)) is the largest island of the Farasan Islands archipelago with a length of about fifty-seven km and a width of twenty-seven km. It lies in the Red Sea about 50 km (31 mi) offshore from Jizan in southwestern Saudi Arabia. With an area of approximately 380 km^{2} (150 sq mi), it is the largest island in Saudi Arabia and the second-largest in the Red Sea after Dahlak Kebir.

It houses Farasan (city), the administrative center and largest urban area of the Farasan Islands Governorate. Greater Farasan and adjacent Sajid islands are linked by a bridge. A ferry service connects the island to the mainland.

== Archaeological sites ==
Farasan City contains archaeological sites and monuments including an Ottoman castle, historical decorated stucco buildings such as Al-Rifa'i House and Al-Najdi Mosque as well as boulders with Himyarite inscriptions and historical wells in the nearby wadi Matar.

The Ottoman castle is located on an elevated ridge of coral-stone bedrock in the north of the City of Farasan. Built by the Ottomans in the early 20th Century, it consists of two rooms within a rectangular building along with a tower-like structure. The fort is enclosed within a protective wire fence.

Wadi Matar oasis, located some 10 km south-east from the City of Farasan, features many ancient wells, pointing to historically important supplies of near-surface ground water. Most of these wells are edged with four-or-so stone slabs and have shafts cut through the bedrock, often taking advantage of natural fissures.

== Nature ==
The surrounding waters are part of the Farasan Island Marine Reserve, established to protect the region’s marine and coastal biodiversity. Al-Qandal Forest, located on the northern part of the island, is a renowned for its dense mangrove forest.

== Kunnah ==
Kunnah is a festive fishing season; the word is derived from kana'ad, the Arabic word for kingfish. Kunnah season starts at the beginning of summer and finishes with the end of June. It witnesses an abundance of different types of fish including but not limited to the kingfish (Scomberomorus cavalla) and parrotfish (Hipposcarus harid). The fishing seasons combined represent 35% of fish production in the Red Sea and 20% of the Saudi Arabia’s fish production.

During the festival, Jazan looks like a floating city due to the large number of fishing boats, and the lights from the ships illuminate the sea at night. The Jazan region produces about 11,000 metric tons (24,000,000 lb) of fish annually with over 3,200 fishermen working along the coasts of 17 fishing ports. It uses about 1,657 boats, resulting in the investment in fisheries and helping preserving the fishing profession.

== Gallery ==
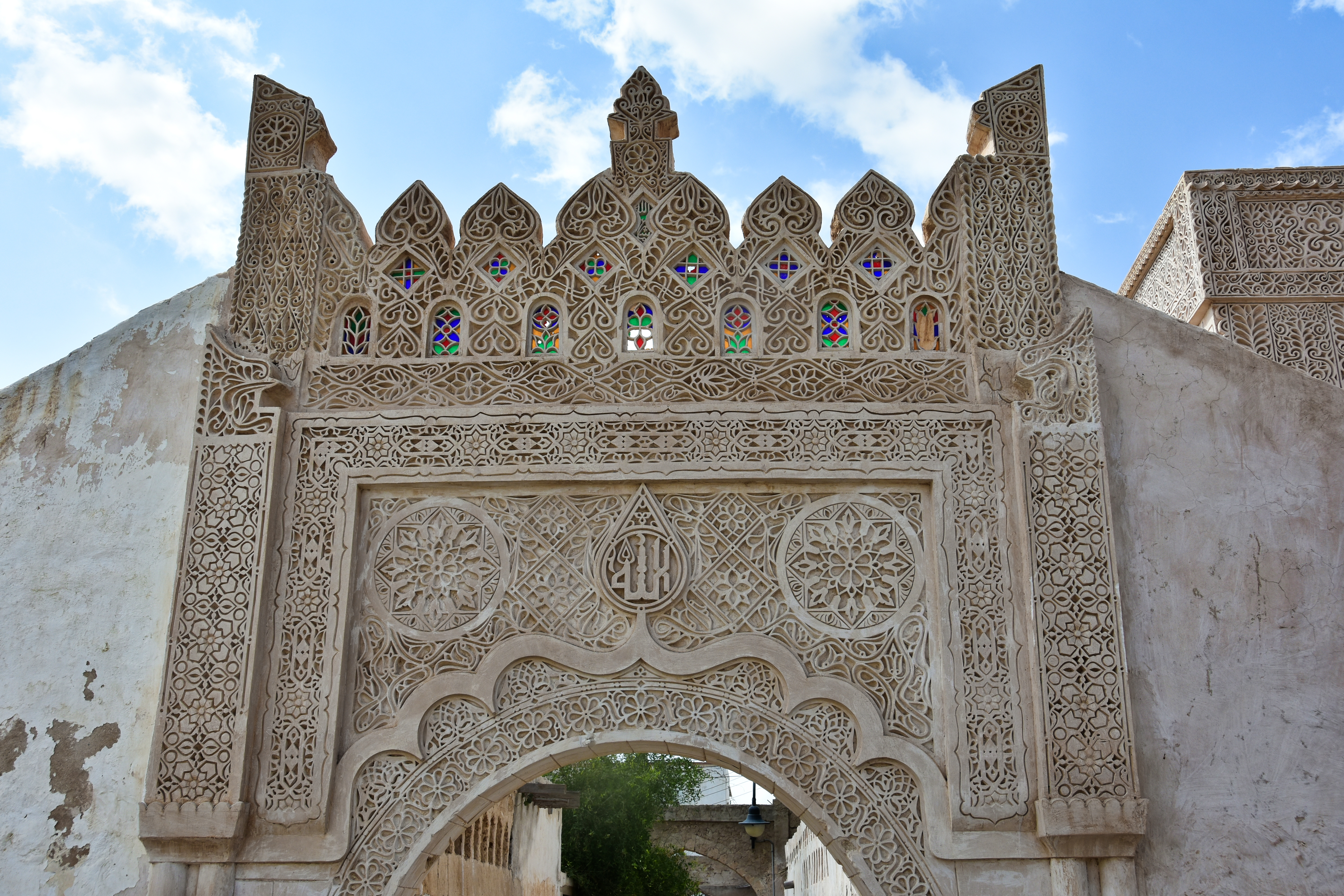
Al-Rifai House built in traditional Farasani architecture

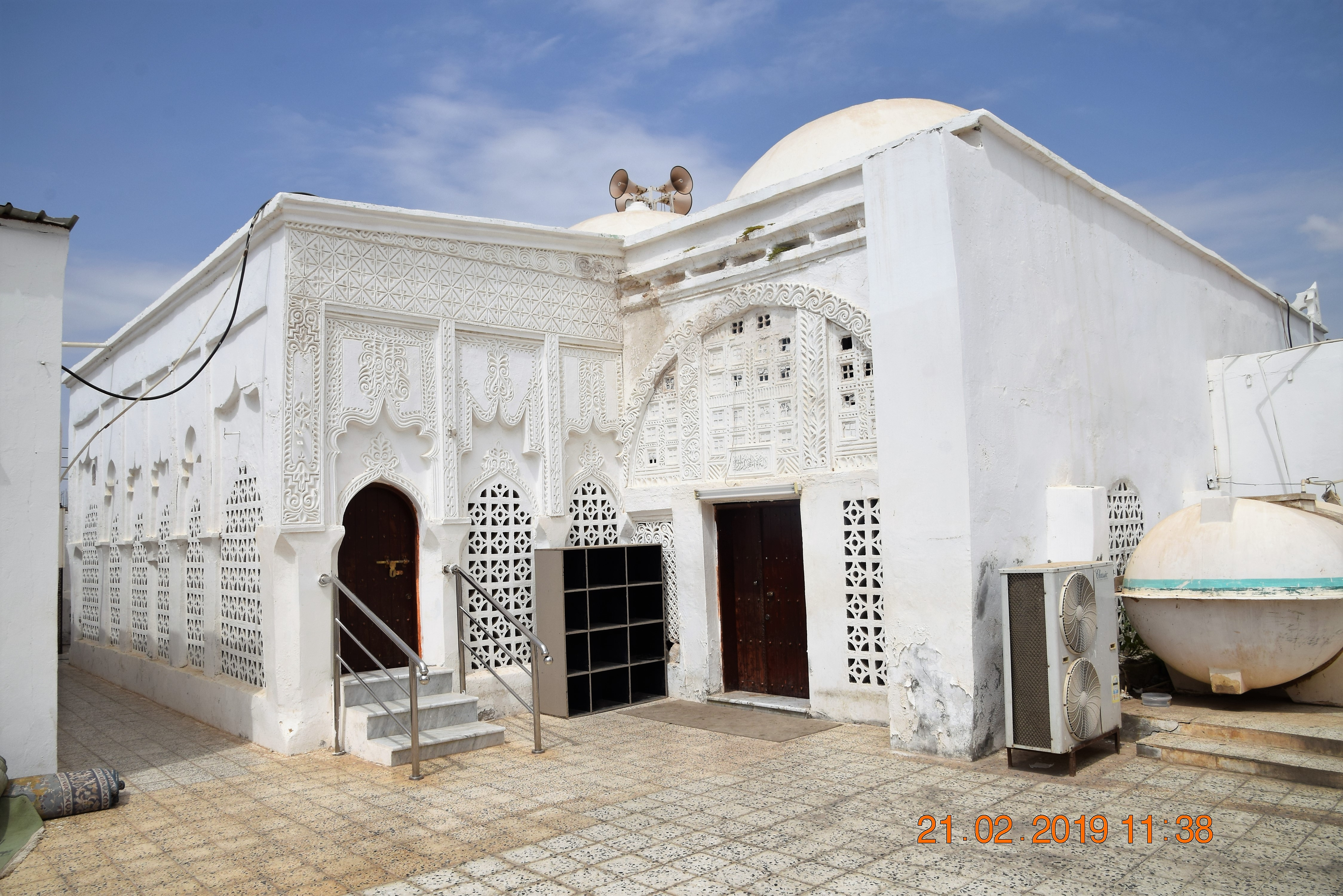
Al-Najdi Mosque in Farsan City

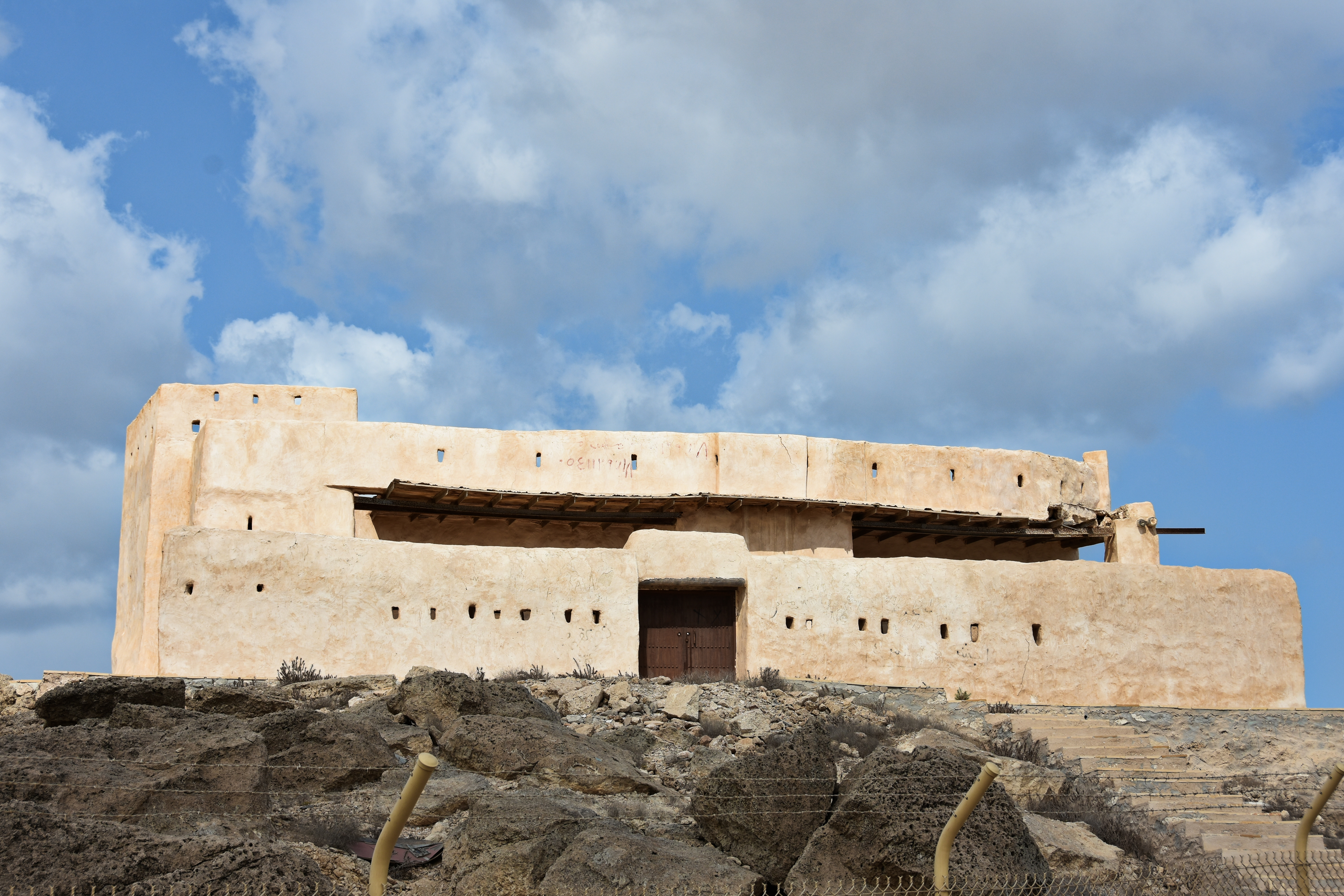
Ottoman fort

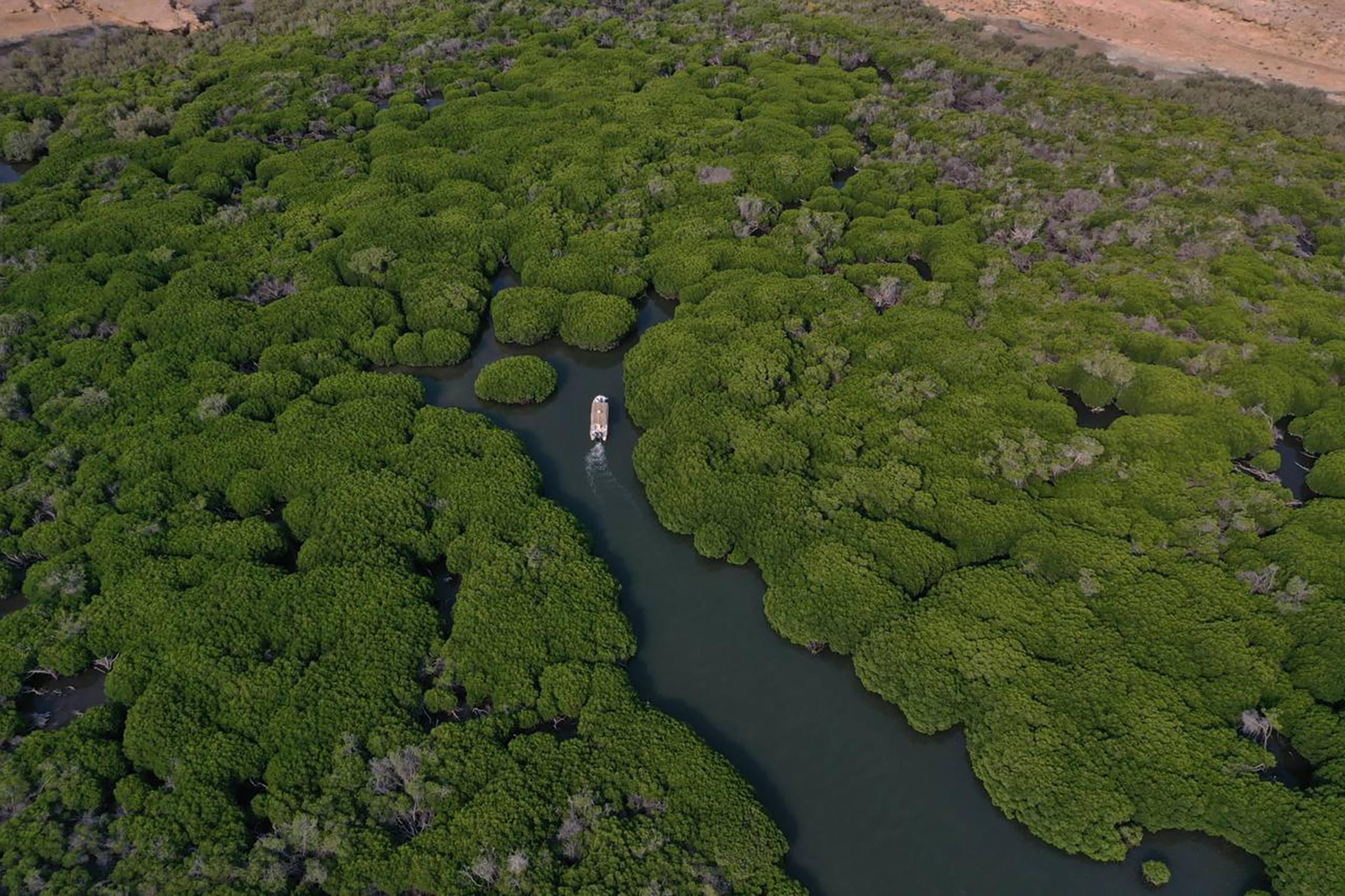
Al-Qandal Forest

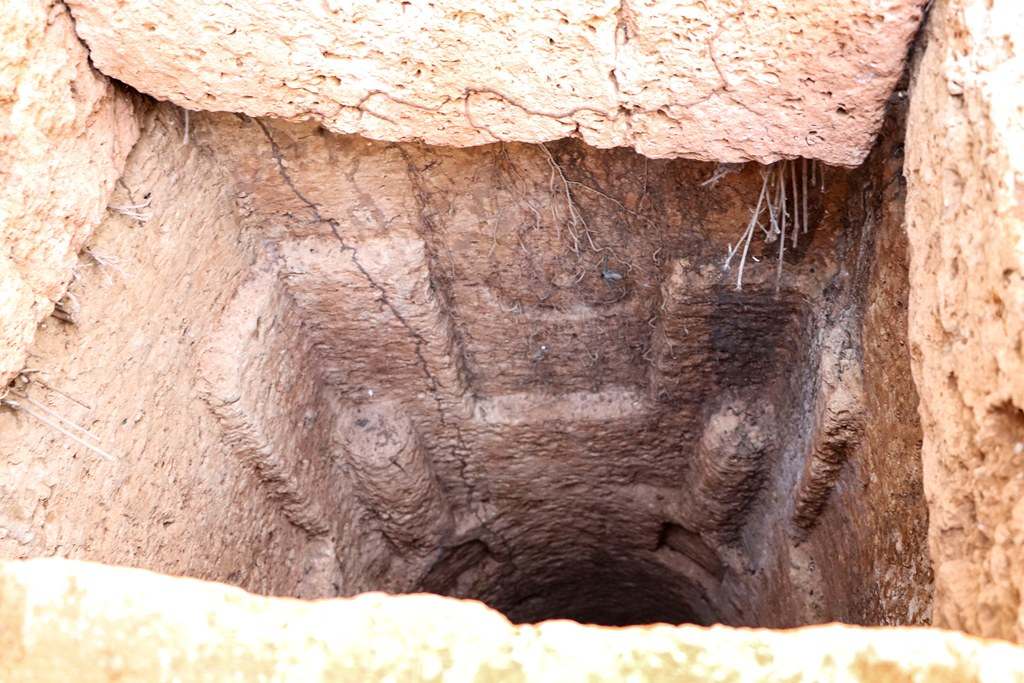
Well in wadi Matar with decoratively carved shaft and carved symbol of the disc and the crescent

== See also ==
- Provinces of Saudi Arabia
- List of islands of Saudi Arabia
- List of governorates of Saudi Arabia
- List of cities and towns in Saudi Arabia
