= List of islands of Djibouti =

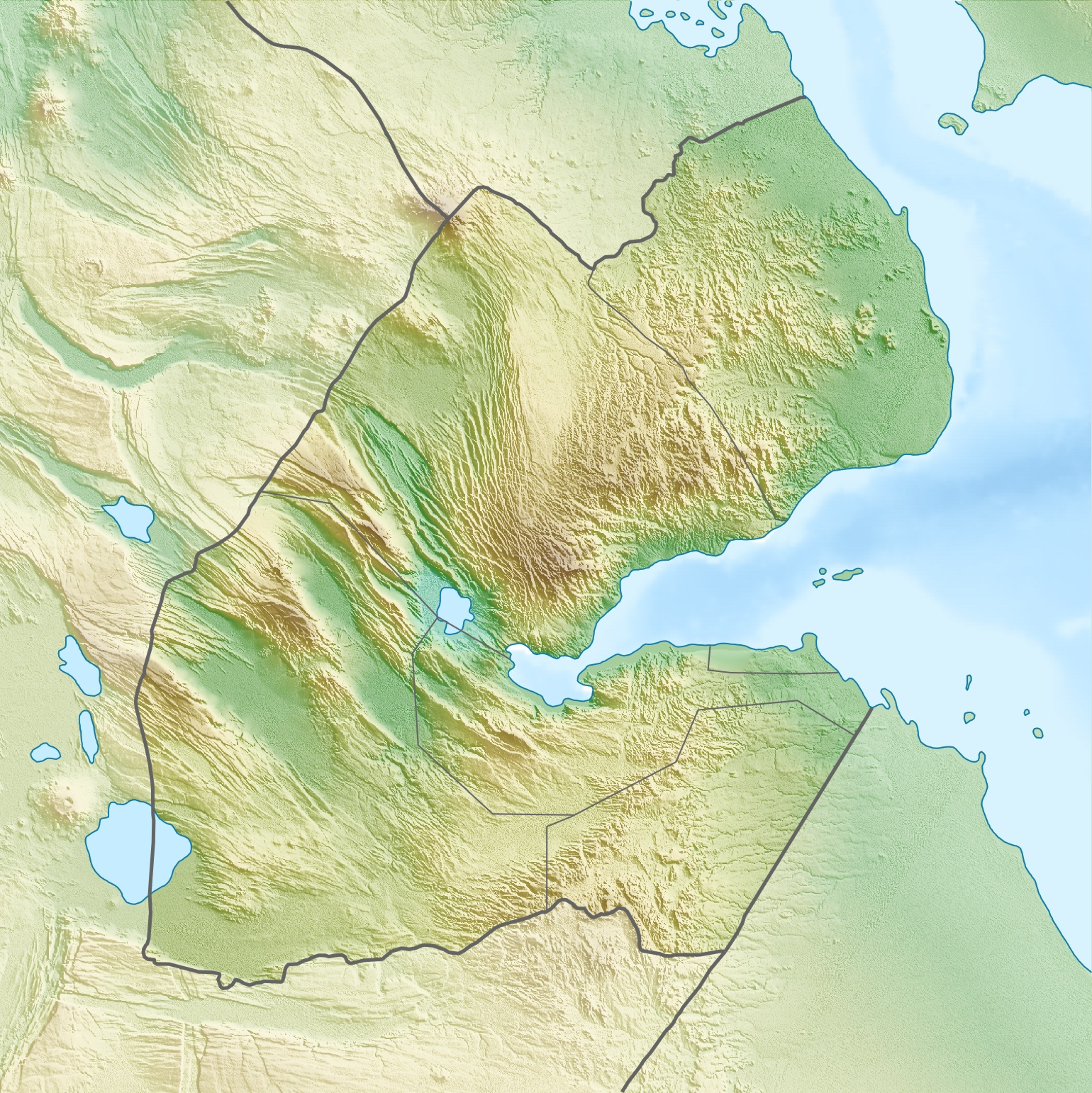
Islands of Djibouti

This is a list of islands of Djibouti:

== Island in the Red Sea ==
- Doumeira (Note: Disputed with Eritrea)

== Islands in the Bab-el-Mandeb ==
- Kaḏḏa Dâbali
- Seven Brothers
- Siyyan Himar
- Rocher Siyyan

== Islands in the Gulf of Tadjoura ==
- Maskali
- Moucha
- Abou Maya
- Warramous

== See also ==
- Geography of Djibouti
- List of islands in the Red Sea
- List of islands of Eritrea
- List of islands of Yemen
