= Bab Iskender =

Eastern section of the Bab-el-Mandeb straits

Coordinates: 12°40′N 43°27′E

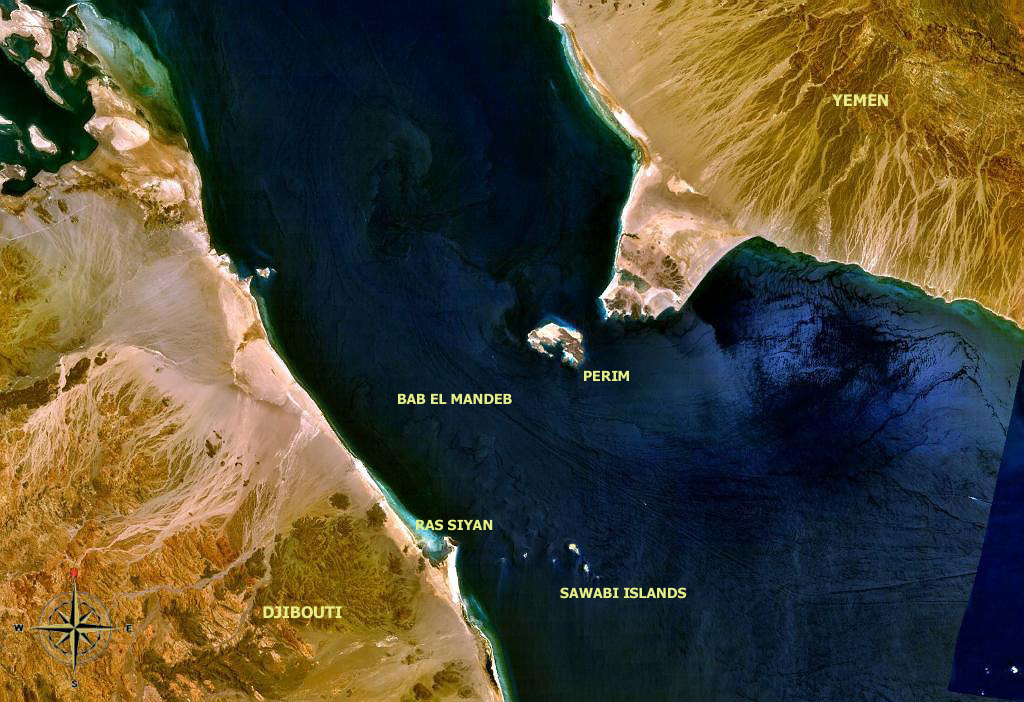
Bab-el-Mandeb area with description

The Bab Iskender (Arabic: باب اسكندر, lit. 'Alexander's Strait'), also variously known as the Eastern Strait, the Small Strait, the Narrow Pass or the Small Pass, is the eastern section of the Bab-el-Mandeb straits, which separates Ras Menheli in Yemen, on the Arabian Peninsula from Ras Siyyan in Djibouti, on the Horn of Africa.

== Geography ==
The strait is 4 miles (6.4 km) wide and 14 fathoms (26 m) deep. The Yemeni island of Perim divides the strait into two channels, Bab Iskender and Dact-el-Mayun respectively.

The western section of the straits, Dact-el-Mayun, (also known as the Western Strait, the Large Strait, the Large Pass or the Wide Pass) has a width of about 15 miles (24 km) and a depth of 180 fathoms (330 m). The straits are about 20 miles (32 km) wide in total.

Near the African coast lies a group of smaller islands known as the Seven Brothers, which belong to Djibouti. Further along, on the Western side of the Dact-el-Mayun, is Eritrea.

The island of Perim, which is owned by Yemen, is a strategic military outpost, due to the Bab-el-Mandeb's position as a shipping route which leads up to the Suez Canal.

Irregular tidal streams make navigation of the Bab Iskender dangerous for ships, however it is still used for shipping, despite frequent shipwrecks in the vicinity of Perim.

In 2008 a project to connect Yemen and Djibouti, crossing the Bab Iskender and Dact-el-Mayun by means of a suspension bridge, via Perim was announced. Al Noor Holding Investment Company launched the $200 billion project, however it was indefinitely delayed in 2010.
