= Dact-el-Mayun =

Coordinates: 12°35′N 43°20′E

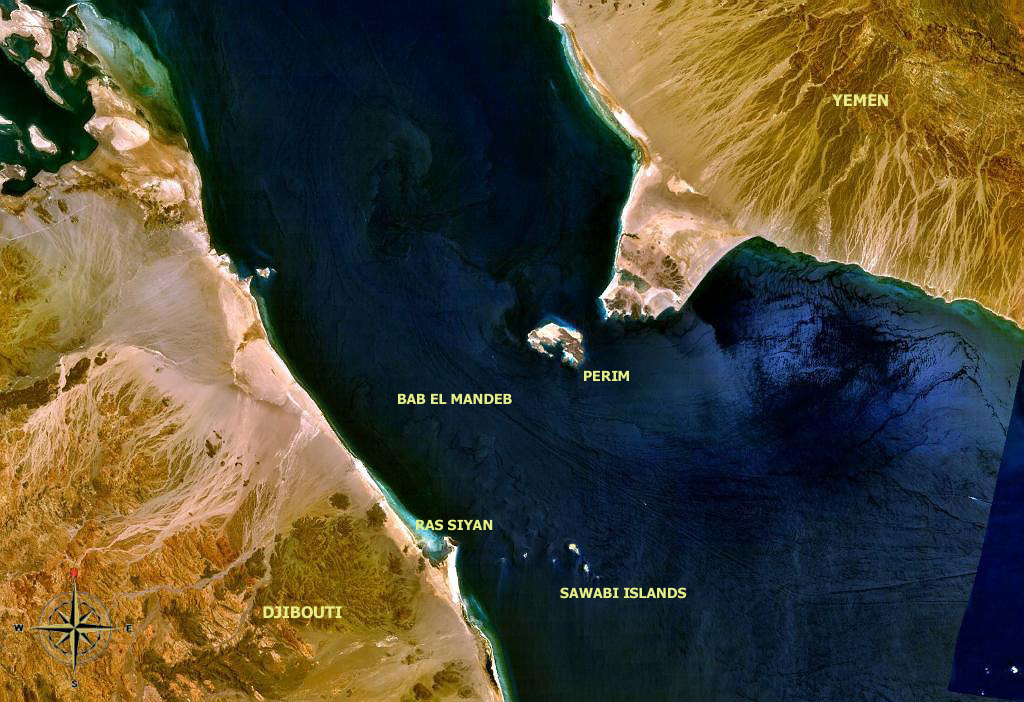
Bab-el-Mandeb area with description

The Dact-el-Mayun (Arabic: داكت الميون), also known as the Western strait, the large strait, the large pass or the wide pass, is the western section of the Bab-el-Mandeb straits, which separates Ras Menheli, Yemen, on the Arabian Peninsula from Ras Siyyan, Djibouti, on the Horn of Africa. The strait has a width of about 16 miles (26 km) and a depth of 170 fathoms (310 m). The Yemeni island of Perim divides the strait into two channels, Bab Iskender and Dact-el-Mayun respectively.

Near the African coast lies a group of smaller islands known as the Seven Brothers.
