= Siyyan Himar =

Islands in Djibouti

Coordinates: 12.5183°N 43.2986°E

Siyyan Himar or Rocher Moulhele is a pair of small islands, about 100 m apart and rising only 1.8 m above sea level, located about 3.8 km off the coast of Djibouti and 4.4 km northeast of the Siyyan peninsula, in the Bab-el-Mandeb strait (between the Red Sea and the Gulf of Aden). They are an uplifted ridge of a fossil coral reef.

== See also ==
- Rocher Siyyan, an islet about 5.5 km south of Siyyan Himar
