= List of geographical features of the Red Sea =

Coastal and marine geographical features of the Red Sea

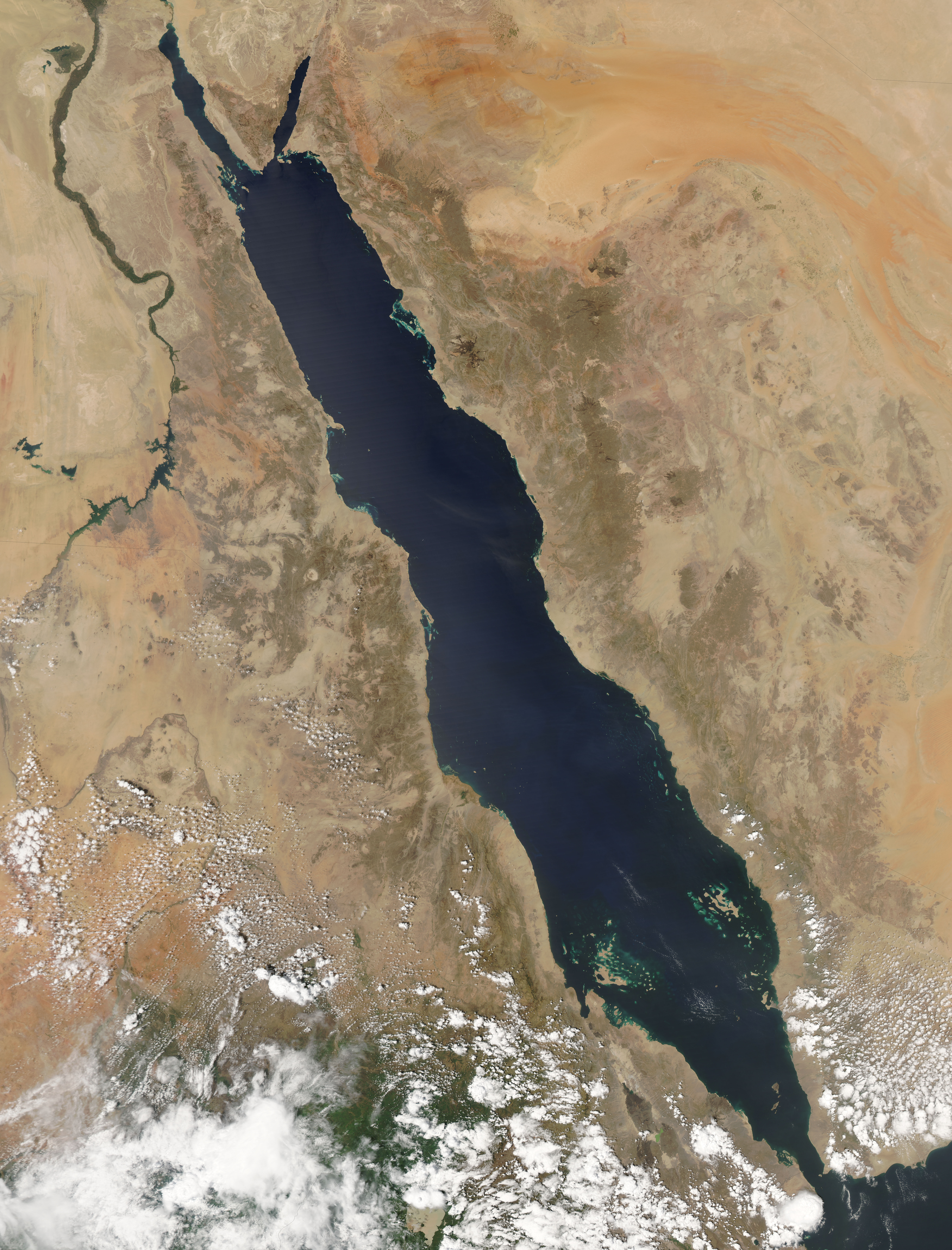
Red Sea image from NASA

Topographic map

This is a list of geographical features of the Red Sea, including named bays, gulfs, peninsulas, capes, straits, inlets, and coastal plains. For the purposes of this list, features of the Gulf of Suez, Gulf of Aqaba, and Bab-el-Mandeb are included. Features shared by more than one country are listed under each adjoining country.

== Geographical features by country ==
=== Djibouti ===
==== Peninsulas and capes ====
- Ras Siyyan

==== Straits ====
- Bab-el-Mandeb

=== Egypt ===
==== Bays and gulfs ====
- Foul Bay
- Gulf of Aqaba
- Gulf of Suez

==== Peninsulas and capes ====
- Ras Banas
- Ras Muhammad
- Sinai Peninsula

==== Straits ====
- Straits of Tiran

=== Eritrea ===
==== Bays and gulfs ====
- Bay of Hawakil
- Gulf of Zula

==== Peninsulas and capes ====
- Buri Peninsula
- Ras Kasar

==== Straits ====
- Bab-el-Mandeb

=== Israel ===
==== Bays and gulfs ====
- Gulf of Aqaba

=== Jordan ===
==== Bays and gulfs ====
- Gulf of Aqaba

=== Saudi Arabia ===
==== Bays and gulfs ====
- Gulf of Aqaba

==== Creeks and inlets ====
- Obhur Creek

==== Coastal plains ====
- Tihamah

==== Straits ====
- Straits of Tiran

=== Sudan ===
==== Bays and gulfs ====
- Dungonab Bay

==== Peninsulas and capes ====
- Ras Kasar

=== Yemen ===
==== Peninsulas and capes ====
- Cheikh Saïd

==== Straits ====
- Bab-el-Mandeb

== See also ==
- Red Sea Rift
- Red Sea Riviera
- Suez Canal
- Tihamah
