= Bab al-Mandab Strait =

Strait between Yemen and Djibouti

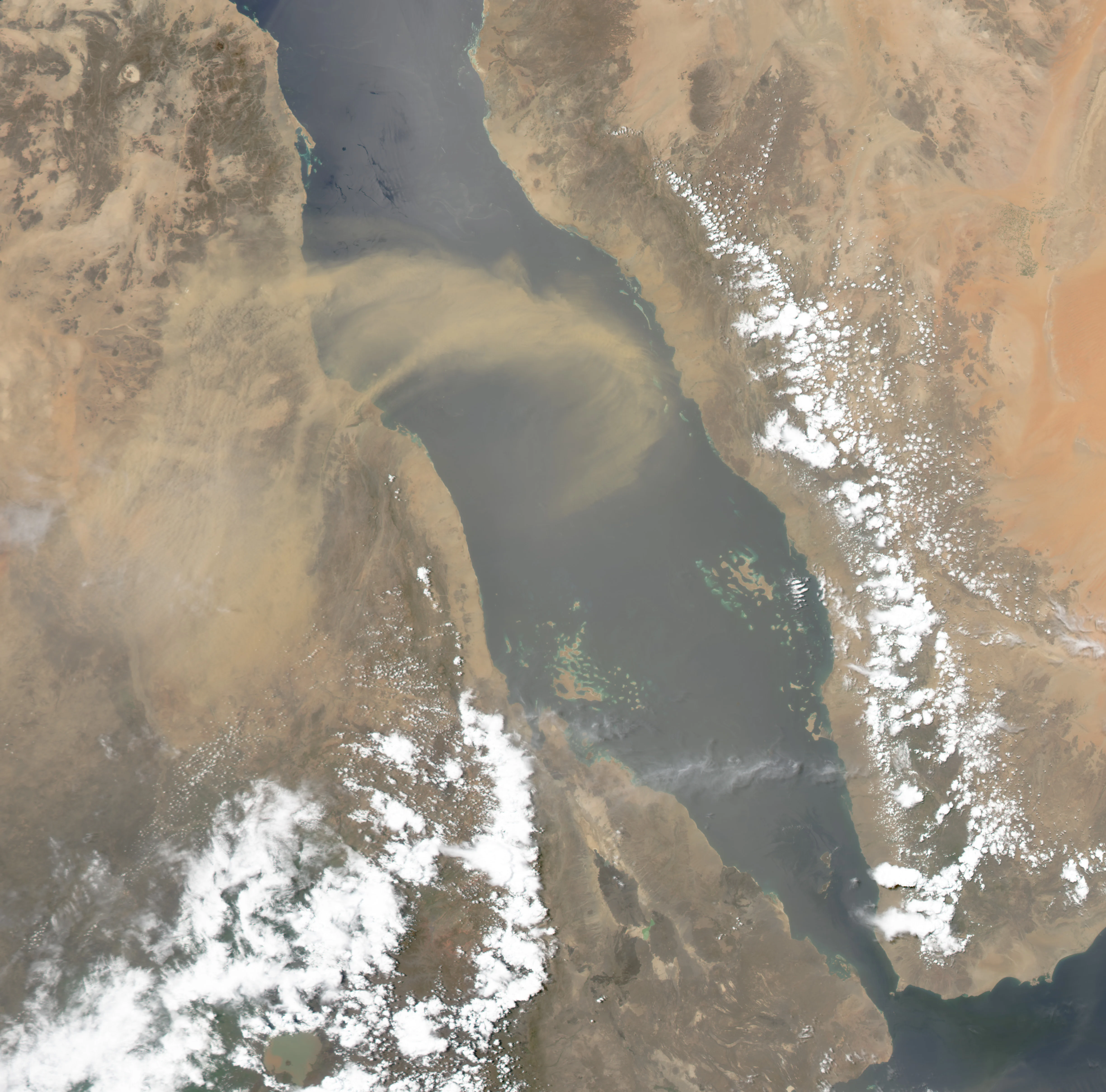
- Sand storm blowing across the Red Sea and the Bab el-Mandeb strait in the south
- Interactive map of Bab al-Mandab Strait
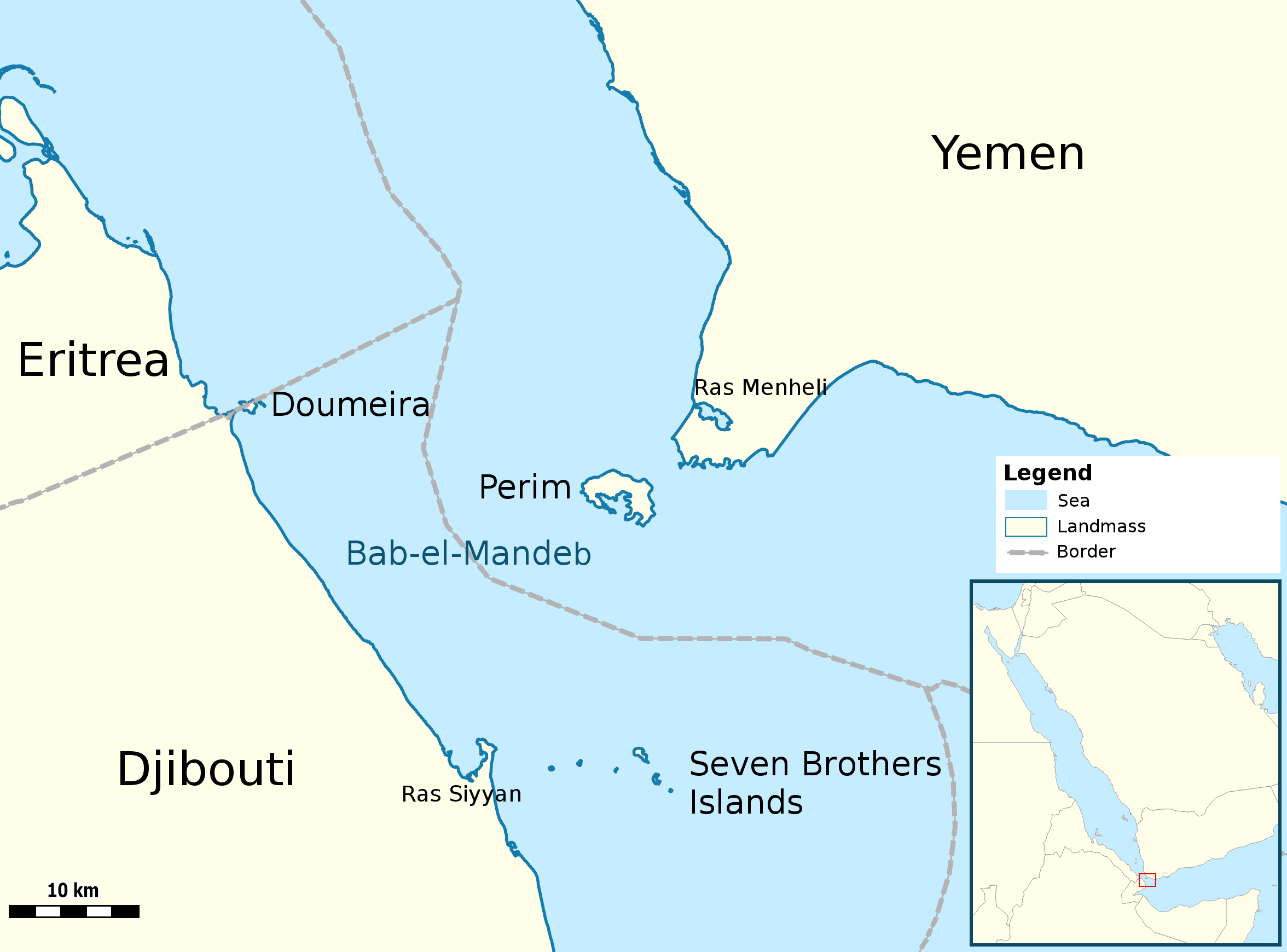
- locator map of the strait
- Location: Between Horn of Africa and South Arabia
- Coordinates: 12°35′N 43°20′E
- Basin countries: Djibouti, Eritrea and Yemen
- Max. length: 31 mi (50 km)
- Min. width: 16 mi (26 km)
- Average depth: 609 ft (186 m)
- Islands: Seven Brothers, Doumeira, Perim

The Bab al-Mandab Strait, (Note: Arabic: باب المندب, lit. 'Gate of Grief') also written simply as the Bab al-Mandab or Bab el-Mandeb, (Note: Alternative spellings include Bab El Mandeb, Bab el-Mandeb, Bab el-Mandab, Bab al-Mandeb and other variants) is a strait and global chokepoint between Yemen on the Arabian Peninsula and Djibouti and Eritrea in the Horn of Africa, connecting the Red Sea to the Gulf of Aden and the Indian Ocean.

== Etymology ==
In Arabic, the term bab means "gate" while mandab translates to "grief" in the English language. The strait derives its name from the dangers attending its navigation or, according to an Arab legend, from the numbers who were drowned by an earthquake that separated the Arabian Peninsula from the Horn of Africa.

== History ==
Paleo-environmental and tectonic events in the Miocene epoch created the Danakil Isthmus, a land bridge forming a broad connection between Yemen and Ethiopia. During the last 100,000 years, eustatic sea level fluctuations have led to alternate opening and closing of the straits. According to the recent single origin hypothesis, the straits of Bab al-Mandab were probably witness to the earliest migrations of modern humans across continents. It is presumed that the oceans were then much lower and the straits were much shallower or dry, which allowed a series of emigrations along the southern coast of Asia.

In Arab tradition it is reported that in ancient times Asia and Africa were joined together, until they were split at the Bab al-Mandab. Yaqut al-Hamawi associates the name Bab al-Mandab with the 6th century crossing of the Aksumites over the sea to Yemen. Two Sabaean inscriptions of the early 6th century mention silsilat al-Mandab in connection with the conflict between Dhu Nuwas and the Aksumites.

The British East India Company unilaterally seized the island of Perim in 1799 on behalf of its Indian empire. The government of Britain asserted its ownership in 1857 and erected a lighthouse there in 1861, using it to command the Red Sea and the trade routes through the Suez Canal. It was used as a coaling station to refuel steamships until 1935 when the reduced use of coal as fuel rendered the operation unprofitable.

The British presence continued until 1967 when the island became part of the People's Republic of South Yemen. Before the handover, the British government had put forward before the United Nations a proposal for the island to be internationalized as a way to ensure the continued security of passage and navigation in the Bab al-Mandab, but this was refused.

In 2008 a company owned by Tarek bin Laden unveiled plans to build a bridge named Bridge of the Horns across the strait, linking Yemen with Djibouti. Middle East Development LLC issued a notice to construct a bridge passing across the Red Sea that would be the longest suspended passing in the world. The project was assigned to two Danish companies: engineering company COWI in collaboration with architect studio Dissing+Weitling. The announced delay to Phase 1 in 2010 and the lack of any further updates since makes this a defunct project.

In September 2026, renewed fighting in Yemen increased international concerns over the security of the Bab-el-Mandeb Strait. The World Food Programme warned that instability around the waterway could affect the movement of food, fuel and commercial goods between Asia, the Middle East, Africa and Europe.

== Significance in the maritime trade route ==
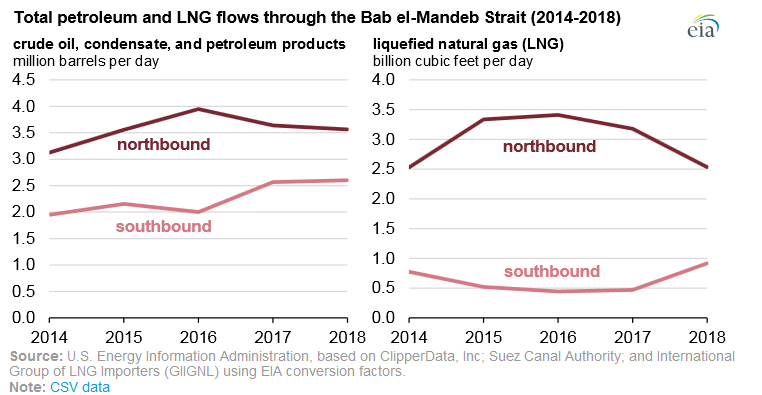
Flows of petroleum products and liquefied natural gas through the strait, 2014–2018

A map of the Red Sea, showing the Bab al-Mandab strait in the south

The Bab al-Mandab acts as a strategic link between the Indian Ocean and the Mediterranean Sea via the Red Sea and the Suez Canal. Most exports of petroleum and natural gas from the Persian Gulf that transit the Suez Canal or the SUMED Pipeline pass through both the Bab al-Mandab and the Strait of Hormuz. While the narrow width of the strait requires vessels to travel through the territorial sea of adjacent states, under the purview of Article 37 of the United Nations Convention on the Law of the Sea, the legal concept of transit passage applies to Bab al-Mandab. Eritrea, unlike the rest of coastal countries, is not a party to the convention.

Chokepoints are narrow channels along widely used global sea routes that are critical to global energy security. The Bab al-Mandab Strait is 26 kilometres (14 nautical miles) wide at its narrowest point, limiting tanker traffic to two 2-mile-wide channels for inbound and outbound shipments.

Closure of the Bab al-Mandab Strait could keep tankers originating in the Persian Gulf from transiting the Suez Canal or reaching the SUMED Pipeline, forcing them to divert around the southern tip of Africa, which would increase transit time and shipping costs.

In 2006, an estimated 3.3 million barrels (520,000 m^{3}) of oil passed through the strait per day, out of a world total of about 43 million barrels per day (6,800,000 m^{3}/d) moved by tankers. (For in-between data, see.) This rose by 2014 to 5.1 million barrels per day (b/d) of crude oil, condensate and refined petroleum products headed toward Europe, the United States, and Asia, then an estimated 6.2 million b/d by 2018.

In 2017, total petroleum flows through the Bab al-Mandab Strait accounted for about 9% of total seaborne-traded petroleum (crude oil and refined petroleum products) in 2017. About 3.6 million b/d moved north toward Europe; another 2.6 million b/d flowed in the opposite direction mainly to Asian markets such as Singapore, China, and India.

== Significance for maritime security and geopolitics ==
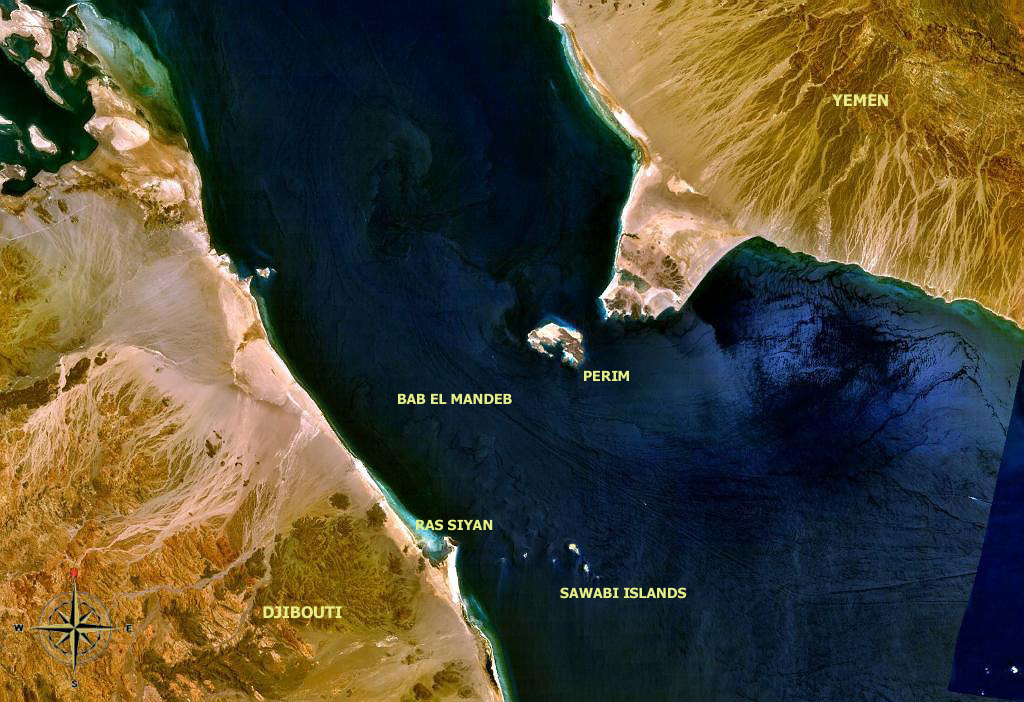
A satellite photo of Bab el-Mandeb, with labels

The Bab al-Mandab is widely regarded to play a key role in international, regional and maritime security in the Middle East, East Africa, the Red Sea, and the Gulf of Aden. The strait is only "9¼ miles (16½ km)" wide at its narrowest point between Djibouti and Perim (the "Large Strait", as opposed to the "Small Strait" on the other side with Yemen), and is considered a choke point, which makes the Bab al-Mandab of economic and strategic interest. The Bab al-Mandab is an important corridor for geostrategic cables underneath the narrow strait passage at the Bab al-Mandab, including power cables and fibre-optic cables used for communication, which attracts the attention of intelligence services for surveillance.

Although the Bab al-Mandab, legally, is an international strait and a transit passage, its strategic position has made command of the sea over the strait key to military influence in the region. The Bab al-Mandab is often discussed alongside other major maritime chokepoints, such as the Suez Canal and the Strait of Hormuz, due to their shared importance for maritime security in the region.

The opening of the Suez Canal in 1869 made the Bab al-Mandab a strategic choke point. Since then, the strait has been subject to claims of control via land-based positions and naval presence. This has been evident between present-day Yemen and the island of Perim on the side of the Arabian Peninsula and Djibouti, Eritrea and the Seven Brothers Islands at the Horn of Africa site, and from sea the Gulf of Aden and the Red Sea.

On the Arabian Peninsula, the British Empire was present in Yemen and at Perim from 1799 until 1967, when the island came under control of People's Democratic Republic of Yemen after its independence from the Aden Protectorate. From 1967 to 1986, there was a strong Soviet presence at Perim and by the Bab al-Mandab. This presence slowly faded out until the end of the Cold War, after which the USSR withdrew their forces.

Today the Yemeni civil war (2014–present) influences the security of the Yemen site. The Iran-backed Houthis and the Yemeni National forces are the key land-based security actors around the Bab al-Mandab, with regional powers including Iran, Israel, Saudi Arabia, and United Arab Emirates trying to influence the conflict.

On the African side of the strait in present-day Djibouti, the French colonial empire was present at the Bab al-Mandab 1862–1967 as French Somaliland and from 1967–1977 as French Territory of the Afars and the Issas, at which point Djibouti voted for its own independence. Other countries were present in colonies such as British Somaliland and Italian Eritrea, among others. Since 1977, France has committed to the independence and territorial integrity of Djibouti, renewed in 2014 and again in 2024.

Djibouti has increasingly become a site for military influence for great powers. Although French forces are still present, the United States overtook Camp Lemonnier from France in 2002. China has the strategically placed People's Liberation Army Support Base in Djibouti. Japan has Japan Self-Defense Force Base Djibouti, and Italy has Italian Military Support Base in Djibouti. Saudi Arabia has established a logistics hub and is in discussions with Djibouti about a military base. Russia has established military relations with Eritrea.

From sea, claims of control of the Bab al-Mandab have been made from the United States since the end of World War II, through US-led naval operations in the area from the United States Naval Forces Central Command in Bahrain. In 2002, the naval partnership Combined Maritime Forces was established. The force conducts maritime control missions in the area and is supported by contributions from 46 countries. This includes latest the Combined Task Force 153 in April 2022 to ensure maritime security for the Bab al-Mandab, the Red Sea and the Gulf of Aden. Measures include efforts to ensure safe transit passage through the strait.

=== Red Sea crisis ===
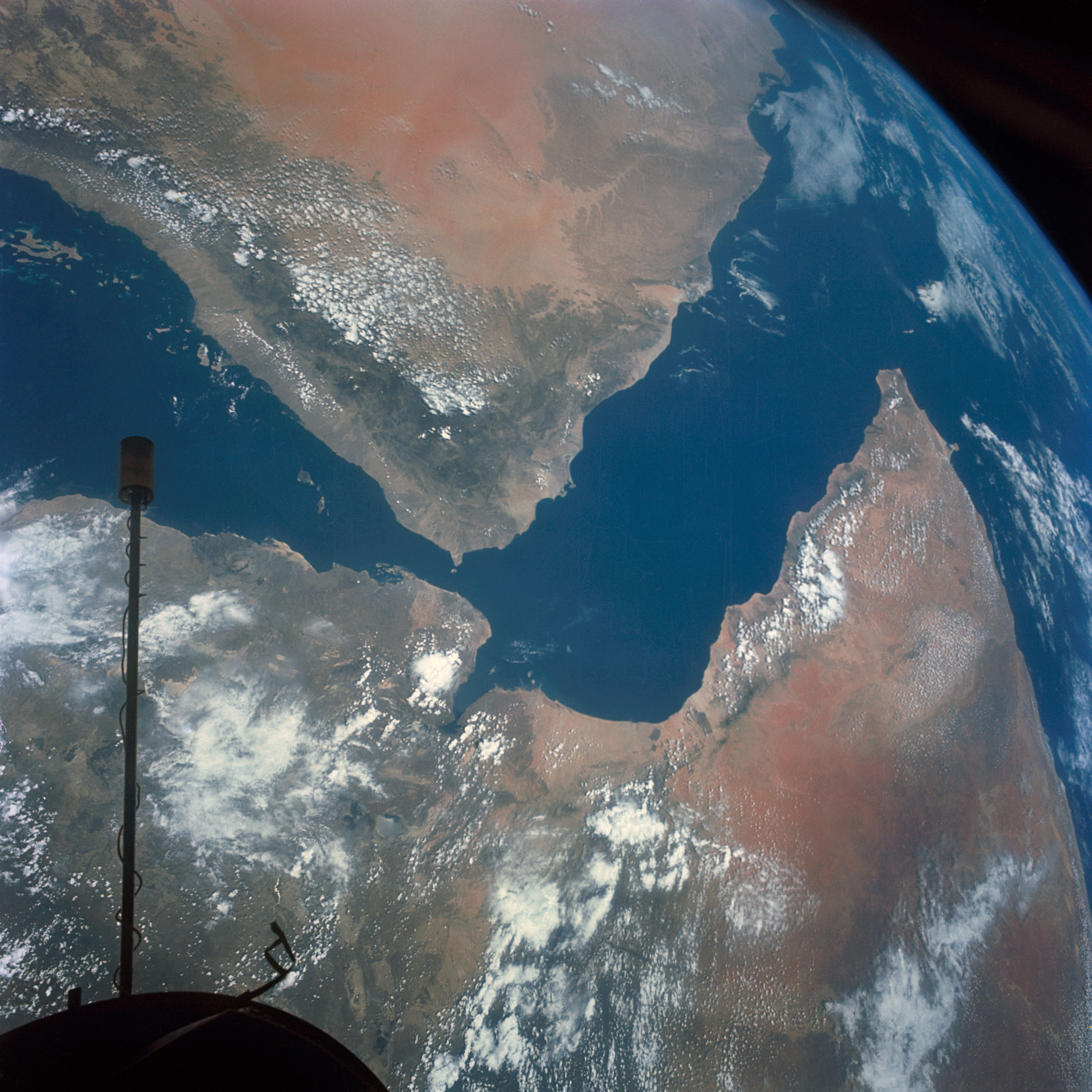
The Bab al-Mandab Strait as seen from the orbiting Gemini 11 above East Africa and the Arabian Peninsula

After the British left in 1967, several attempts were made to deter piracy and ensure safe passage through the strait. Notable is the 2009 Djibouti Code of Conduct, signed on to by twenty-two regional states.

Since the beginning of the Red Sea crisis in 2014, a number of operations were initiated to ensure safe passage through the Bab al-Mandab, including the Saudi led "Operation Golden Spear" (2017), Operation Prosperity Guardian (2023) under the Combined Maritime Forces, and the EU-led Operation Aspides (2024– ).

Following the October 2023 invasion of the Gaza Strip by the IDF after the Hamas attack on Israel of October 7 of that year, the Iran-backed Houthis in Yemen attacked Israel, American and British tankers in the Red Sea, and commercial ships. A conflict continued until a ceasefire was brokered in late 2025. With asymmetric warfare, the Houthis used anti-access/area denial to change the security situation in the Red Sea, using the chokepoint of the Bab al-Mandab and the national waters of Yemen as a strategic advantage. The Houthis have been backed by Iran in the broader Axis of Resistance. The CRINK-alliance have allegedly supported the Houthis with weapons, dual-use weapons and geospatial intelligence. There have been references to tracked navy ships in the area from Russia.

Effective March 11, 2025, Yemeni forces declared the strait closed to all Israeli-owned and Israeli-flagged shipping until all crossings into the Gaza Strip were reopened and the entry of humanitarian supplies was authorized.

In April 2026, Houthi official Hussein al-Ezzi warned that the Bab al-Mandab strait could be closed, stating that "no force would be able to reopen it" if Sanaa makes the decision. The warning came amid heightened tensions over the US naval blockade of Iran.

On 20 July 2026, the Houthis announced that it would stage a marine blockade of ships from Saudi Arabia trying to transit through the Bab al-Mandab, in response to what it called a "continued Saudi siege" of Yemen. Saudi Arabia, which had been increasing its use of ports in the Red Sea to fill tankers which then pass through the strait, said that it would "take all necessary measures to protect its vessels".

On 18 September 2026, the United States lifted sanctions against Eritrea's ruling People's Front for Democracy and Justice and the Eritrean Defense Forces, as well as several Eritrean individuals and entities previously sanctioned over Eritrea's involvement in the Tigray War. The sanctions had been imposed in 2021 by the Biden administration over humanitarian and human rights concerns related to Eritrean military involvement in northern Ethiopia. The decision came amid heightened security concerns around the Red Sea, as recent Houthi advances in Yemen had increased threats to shipping through the Bab el-Mandab Strait, while Eritrea's southern coastline and the port of Assab lie close to the strategic passage connecting the Red Sea and the Gulf of Aden. On 16 September, a senior Eritrean delegation held high-level talks in Saudi Arabia with officials from the Saudi Ministry of Foreign Affairs, Saudi energy officials and Saudi Aramco on expanding bilateral relations, trade and energy cooperation. Egypt had also deepened its strategic and maritime cooperation with Eritrea, with the two countries coordinating on Red Sea security and freedom of navigation, while Egypt reaffirmed its support for Eritrea's sovereignty and territorial integrity. Egypt and Saudi Arabia likewise reaffirmed their strategic coordination over Red Sea security and freedom of navigation through the Bab el-Mandab. The lifting of U.S. sanctions therefore occurred as Washington's relationship with Asmara was shifting at a time when Eritrea's strategic position on the Red Sea had gained renewed importance amid the Houthi threat to maritime traffic and expanding Eritrean ties with Saudi Arabia and Egypt.

== Geography ==
NASA photo south of the strait looking north

The distance across is about 26 kilometres (14 nmi) from Ras Menheli in Yemen to Ras Siyyan in Djibouti. The island of Perim divides the strait into two channels. The eastern, known as the Bab Iskender (Alexander's Strait), is 5.37 kilometres (2.90 nmi) wide and has a depth of 29 metres; 96 feet (16 fathoms). The western, or Dact-el-Mayun, has a width of 20.3 kilometres (11.0 nmi) and a depth of 310 metres; 1,020 feet (170 fathoms).

Near the coast of Djibouti lies a group of smaller islands known as the "Seven Brothers". There is a surface current inwards in the eastern channel, but a strong undercurrent outwards in the western channel. The width between the island of Perim (Yemen) and Big Island (Kaḏḏa Dâbali), Djibouti is just 17 kilometres (9.2 nmi).

=== Islands ===
Islands and archipelagos in and near the Bab al-Mandab include:

- Doumeira Islands — islands between Djibouti and Eritrea.
- Hanish Islands — Yemeni archipelago in the southern Red Sea.
- Perim — Yemeni island dividing the strait into two channels.
- Rocher Siyyan — Djiboutian islet near Ras Siyyan.
- Seven Brothers Islands — Djiboutian archipelago in the Dact-el-Mayun.
- Siyyan Himar — pair of small Djiboutian islands.

=== Demographics ===
Country	Area (km^{2})	Population (2016 est.)	Population density (per km^{2})	Capital	GDP (PPP) $M USD	GDP per capita (PPP) $ USD
Yemen	527,829	27,392,779	51.9	Sanaa	$58,202	$2,249
Eritrea	117,600	6,380,803	54.3	Asmara	$9,121	$1,314
Djibouti	23,200	846,687	36.5	Djibouti City	$3,327	$3,351
Total	668,629	34,620,269	51.8 / km^{2}	Various	$70,650	$1,841

== Population centers ==
The most significant towns and cities along both the Eritrean, Djiboutian and Yemeni sides of the Bab al-Mandab:

=== Eritrea ===
- Assab
- Edd

=== Djibouti ===
- Khôr ʽAngar
- Moulhoule
- Fagal

=== Yemen ===
- At Turbah
- Cheikh Saïd
- Perim

== See also ==
- List of islands in the Red Sea
- List of geographical features of the Red Sea

Strait:

- Red Sea Dam

Region:

- Horn of Africa
- Mashriq
