= Elphinstone Reef =

Small reef in the Egyptian Red Sea

Coordinates: 25°18′31″N 34°51′37″E

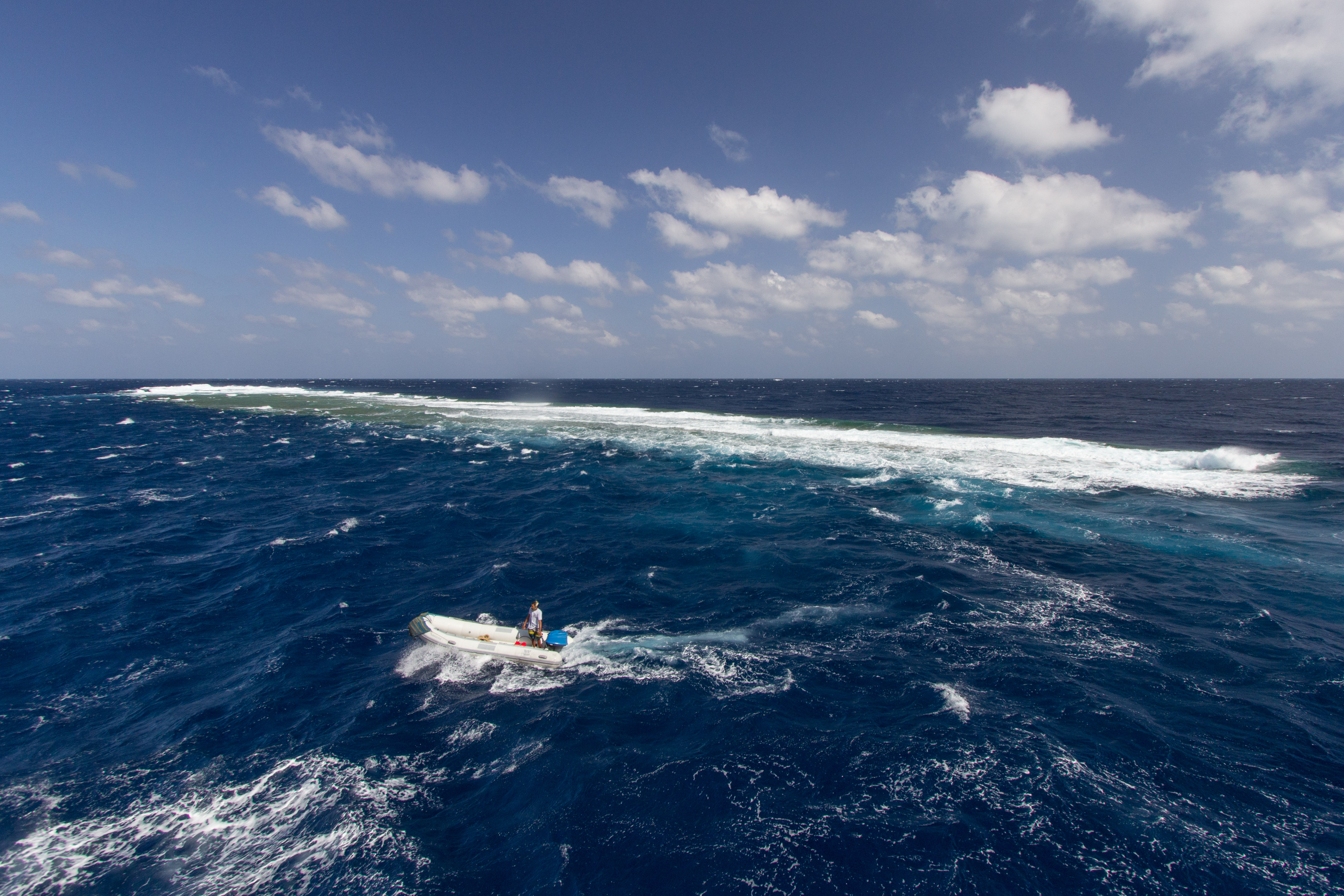
Elphinstone Reef

Elphinstone Reef (also known as Sha'ab Abu Hamra) is a standalone reef in the Egyptian Red Sea situated about 30 kilometers north from the town of Marsa Alam in Egypt. The coral community in this reef is primarily composed of soft corals such as Dendronephthya species.

== Gallery ==
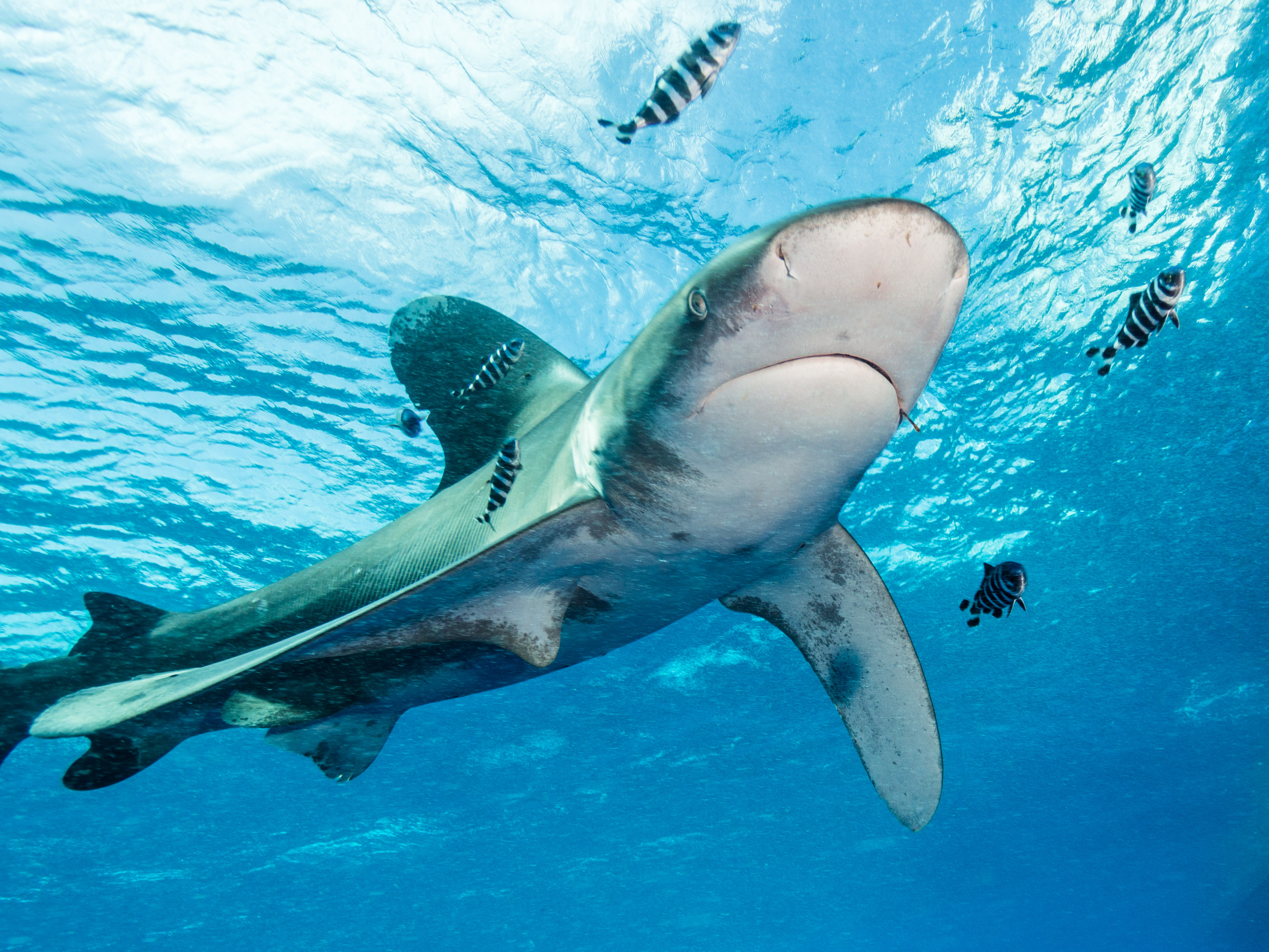
Oceanic whitetip shark at Elphinstone Reef

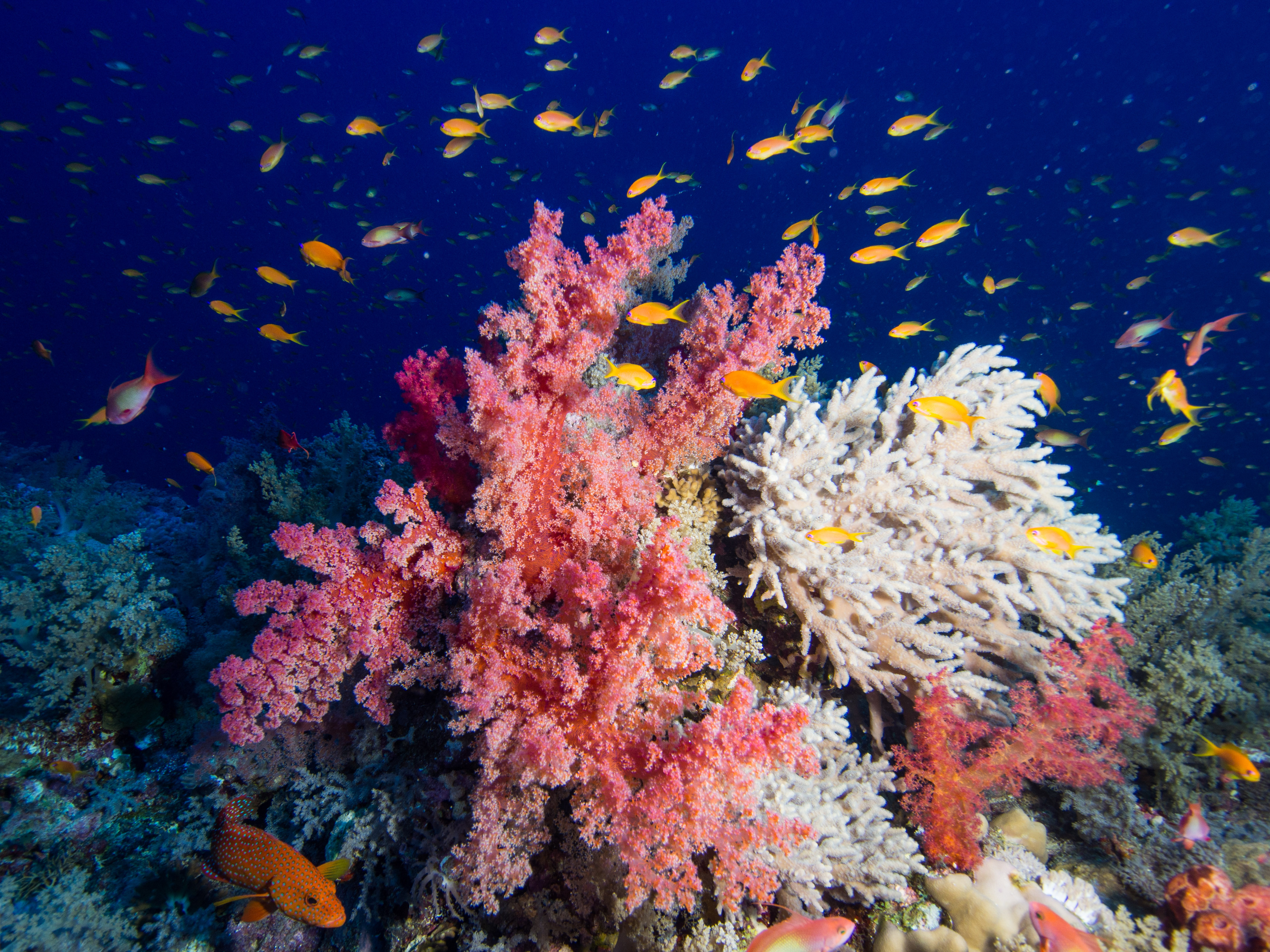
Soft corals and Anthias at Elphinstone Reef

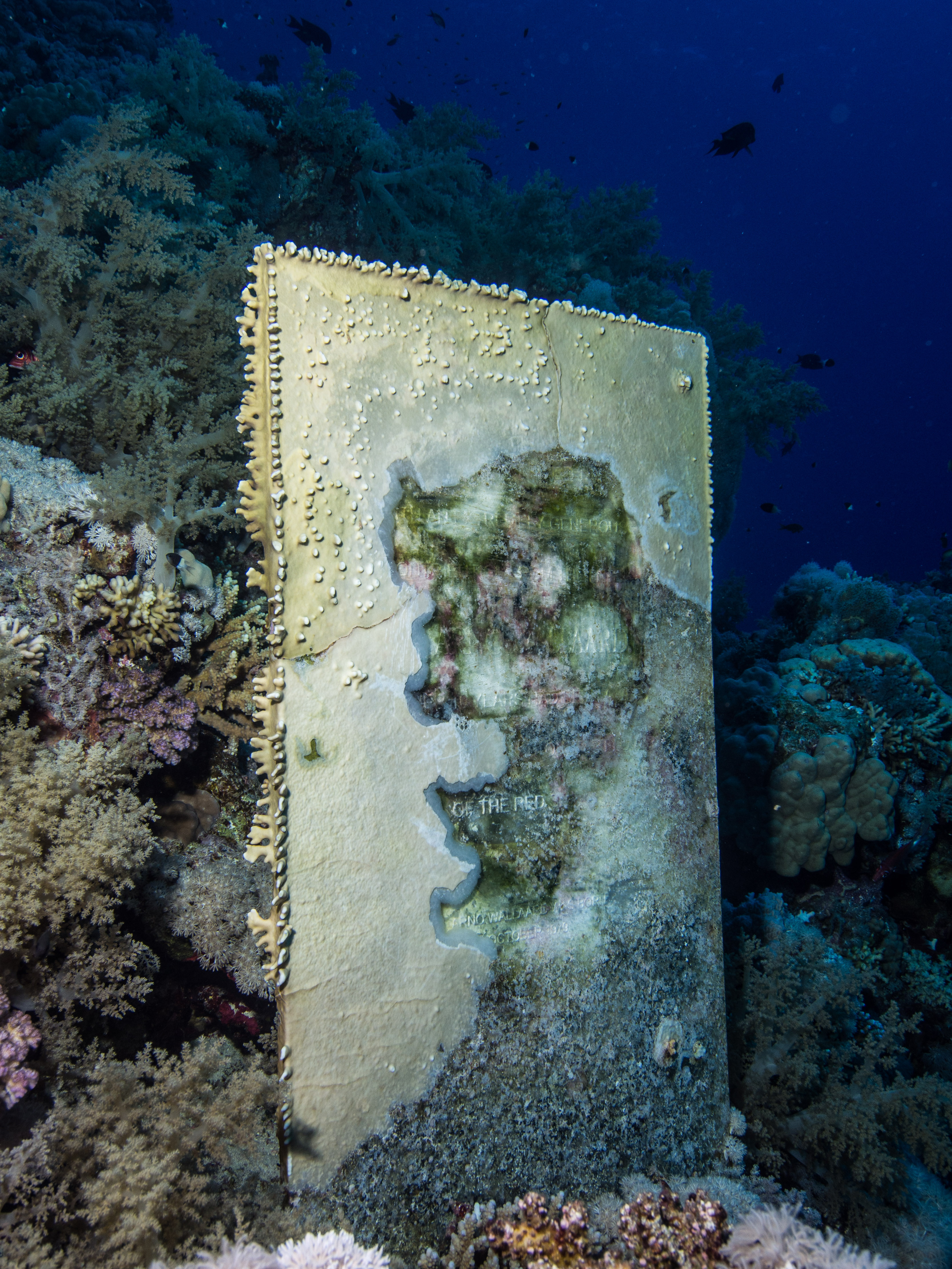
Memorial dedicated to Arno Wallaard on south plato

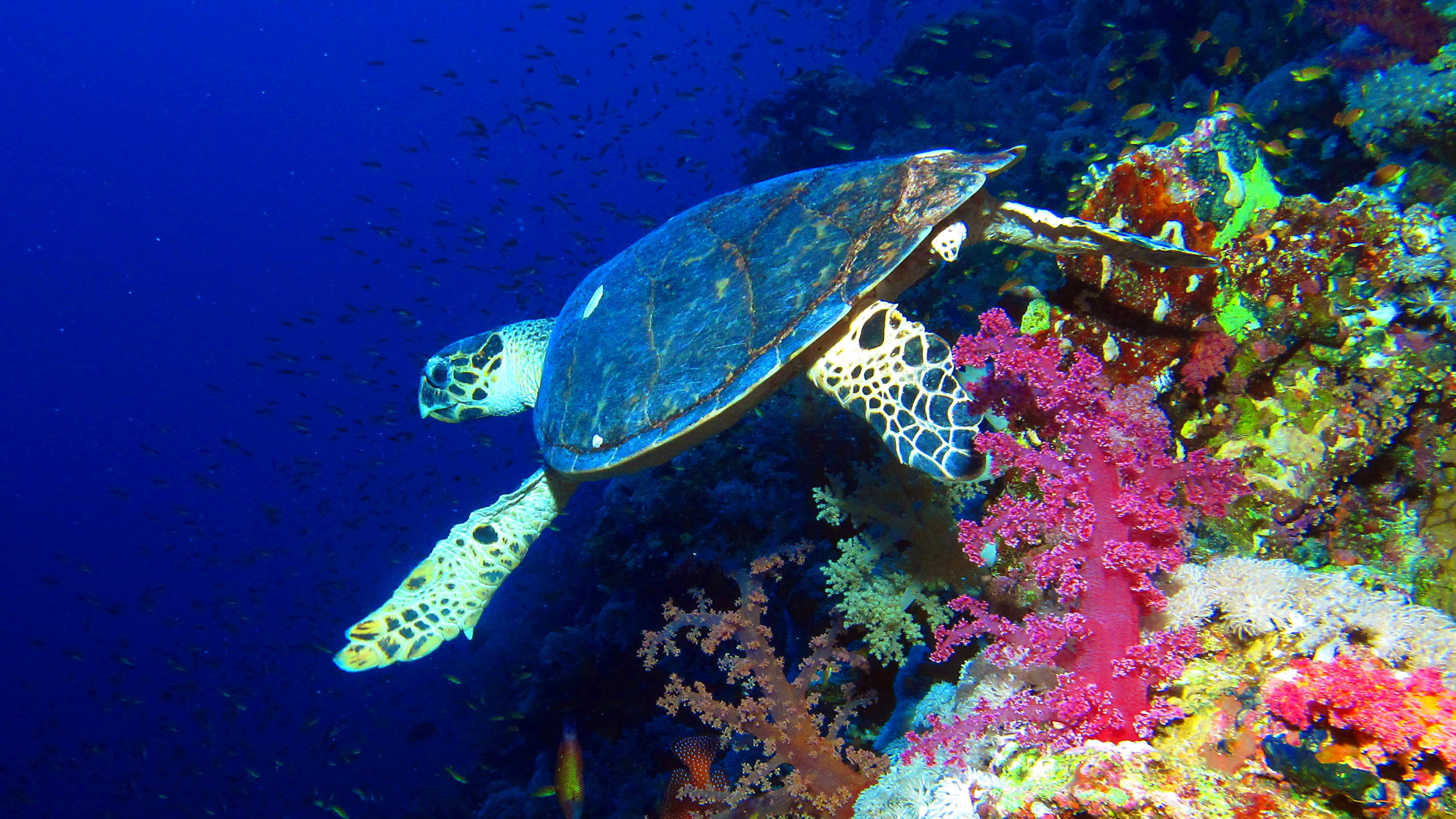
Hawksbill turtle at Elphinstone Reef
Anthias and hard corals at the Elphinstone Reef drop-off Dendronephthya Soft corals at Elphinstone Reef, Egypt. They thrive in the strong currents at this offshore site. A pair of bluecheek butterflyfish (Chaetodon semilarvatus) at Elphinstone Reef, Egypt.
