= Kaḏḏa Dâbali =

Uninhabited island in the Bab-el-Mandeb strait

Kaḏḏa Dâbali Island
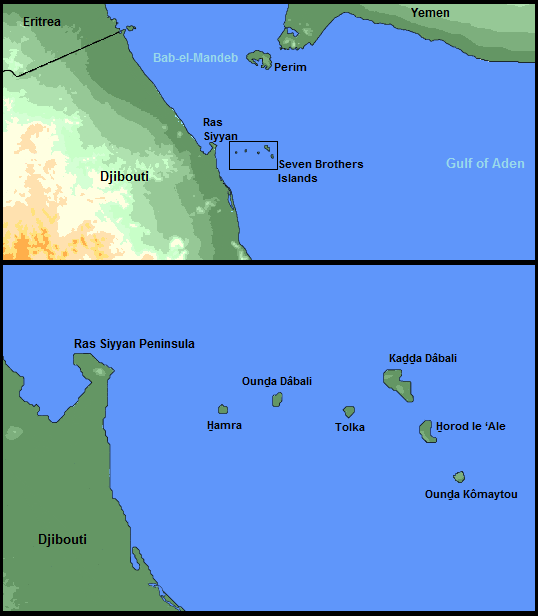
- Kaḏḏa Dâbali Island Map
- Interactive map of Kaḏḏa Dâbali Island

Geography
- Location: Red Sea
- Coordinates: 12.471°N 43.430°E
- Archipelago: Seven Brothers
- Highest elevation: 114 m (374 ft)

Kaḏḏa Dâbali Island, often called Big Island (Modern Arabic: الجزيرة الكبرى), is an uninhabited rocky island off the coast of Obock Region of Djibouti in the Bab-el-Mandeb strait (between the Red Sea and the Gulf of Aden). It is the largest one of the Seven Brothers Islands.
