= Red Sea Dam =

Speculative macro-engineering proposal

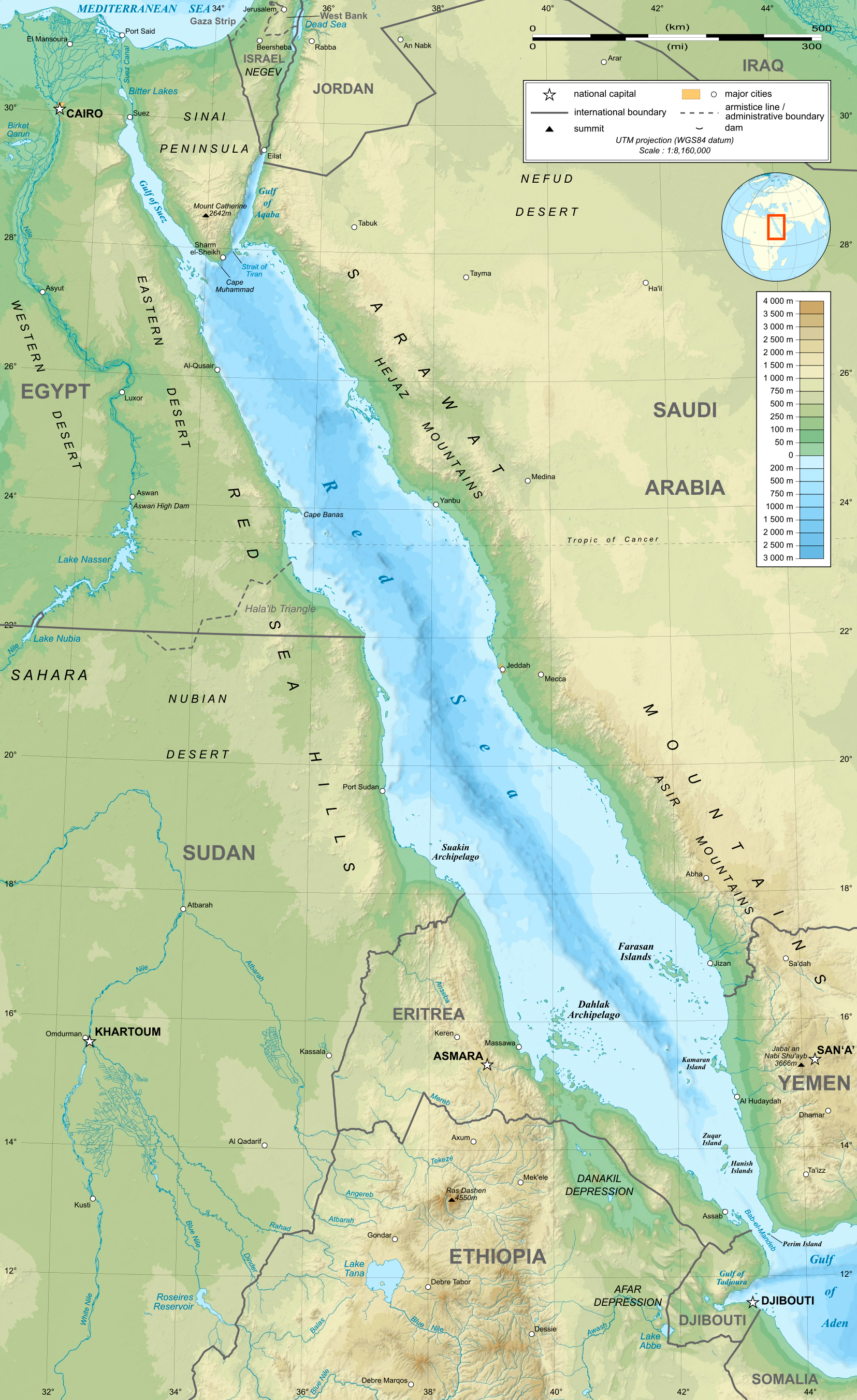
- The proposal is to dam the narrow inlet to the Red Sea, shown at the bottom-right of the image.
- Interactive map of Red Sea Dam
- Location: Djibouti; Yemen
- Coordinates: 12°33′25″N 43°22′20″E

Dam and spillways
- Impounds: Bab-el-Mandeb Strait
- Length: 29 km (18 mi)

Power Station
- Installed capacity: 50,000 MW

The Red Sea Dam is a speculative macro-engineering proposal put forward in 2007 by a group of scientists and engineers. Although the authors' intentions are to explore "the ethical and environmental dilemmas and some of the political implications of macro-engineering", the proposal has attracted both criticism and ridicule.

== Proposal ==
The idea is to dam the Red Sea at its southern end where the Bab-al-Mandab Strait is only 29 km (18 mi) wide. Natural evaporation would rapidly lower the level of the enclosed Red Sea, by about 2.1 meters per year (6.8 feet per year). Water rushing back into the sea would then drive turbines to generate electricity. The dam would have the potential to generate 50 gigawatts of emissions-free hydroelectric power. In comparison, the largest nuclear power plant in the United States has an output of 3.2 gigawatts.

== Implications ==
The proposal's authors point out that "Macro-engineering projects of this size cause massive destruction of existing ecologies", a point emphasized by critics who note the damage caused by current, far smaller schemes.

The authors also note the benefits of the project. Besides helping to satisfy the region's growing energy needs, there are environmental benefits to the scheme: "On the positive side of the environmental scale, however, are the big reductions of greenhouse gas emissions, and the reduced pace of fossil hydrocarbon resource exhaustion".

Peter Bosshard, policy director of International Rivers in California, an anti-dam organization, condemned the scheme as ludicrous.

== See also ==
- Atlantropa
- Bridge of the Horns
- Hydroelectricity
- Qattara Depression Project
