= Red Sea Cable =

Submarine power cable connecting Egypt and Jordan

Red Sea Cable is the designation of a 13.6 km long 400 kV AC submarine power cable under the Red Sea that interconnects the power grids of Egypt and Jordan. The project was commissioned in 1994 and inaugurated in 1998.

The cable has a maximum transmission capacity of 2,000 MW and reaches a maximum depth of 850 metres. It has a cross section of 1,000 mm2 per conductor and is implemented as an oil-filled single core cable insulated with cellulose paper impregnated with a low viscosity mineral oil. A sheath of arsenic lead alloy F3 (0.15% arsenic, 0.1% tin, 0.1% bismuth and 99.65% lead) prevents water from penetrating the paper insulation. The cable is part of a 400 kV-line from Taba in Egypt to Aqaba in Jordan.

== Coordinates ==
- 29.379469 N 34.977669 E: Aqaba Power Station
- 29.432459 N 34.977121 E: Aqaba Cable Terminal
- 29.486346 N 34.875476 E: Taba Cable Terminal
- 29.611148 N 34.841852 E: Taba substation

== See also ==
- Energy in Egypt
