= Rocher Siyyan =

Coordinates: 12.4696°N 43.3083°E

Rocher Siyyan is a striking isolated white islet in the middle of the marshy bay to the west of Ras Siyyan peninsula. It is situated off the coast of Djibouti, in the Bab-el-Mandeb strait between the Red Sea and the Gulf of Aden. The rock belongs to Djibouti's Obock District.

Rocher Siyyan is located about 800 m southwest from the volcanic hill that is the northern tip of Ras Siyyan, and about 1500 m from the mainland's shoreline.

It is 55 meters long, up to 45 meters wide, and has an area of barely 2,000 square meters.
