= Edd, Eritrea =

Edd
- Town
- Location in Eritrea
- Coordinates: 13°56′N 41°42′E
- Country: Eritrea
- Region: Southern Red Sea

Population
  - Estimate: 11,259

Edd is a town in the Southern Red Sea region of Eritrea. It is situated on the main highway that connects Asseb, the former province of Denkalia, and Massawa. The majority of the townspeople belong to the Afar ethnic group.

== Overview ==
Edd was the first port that the French attempted to take possession of; their presence in the town proved ephemeral. A contract for the settlement's purchase dated 12 September 1840 between Sheikh Mahmud Hasan of Edd and Badri Ali on the one side, and representatives of the Compagnie Nanto-Bordelaise on the other, survives.
