= Seven Brothers Islands =

Island of Djibouti

Native name: Îles des Sept Frères / Sawabi
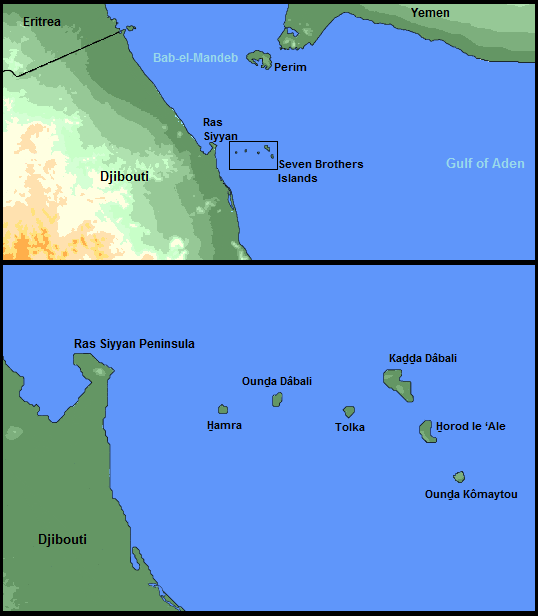
- Interactive map of Seven Brothers Islands

Geography
- Location: Bab-el-Mandeb
- Coordinates: 12°27′46″N 43°24′06″E
- Total islands: 6
- Area: 1.02 km^{2} (0.39 sq mi)
- Highest elevation: 114 m (374 ft)

Administration
- Djibouti
- Region: Obock
- Sub-prefecture: Khor Angar

The Seven Brothers Islands, also known as the Sawabi Islands or Seba Islands, is an archipelago in the Dact-el-Mayun section of the Bab-el-Mandeb strait (between the Red Sea and the Gulf of Aden). They are within the Obock sub-prefecture of Djibouti, and are a notable diving site. Even in English publications, the group is often called by its French name, îles des Sept Frères.

In 2025, the islands were designated as biosphere reserves by UNESCO.

== Geography ==
The archipelago proper is a chain of six volcanic islands spanning about 10 kilometres (6.2 mi) in a rough east-west line:

- West Island, or Red Island (H̱amra), 62 m high
- Double Island (Ounḏa Dâbali), 46 m high
- Low Island (Tolka), 17 m high
- Big Island (Kaḏḏa Dâbali), 114 m high
- East Island (H̱orod le ‘Ale), 83 m high
- South Island (‘Ounḏa Kômaytou), 47 m high

The "seventh brother" is not an island, but the volcanic hill at the northern tip of the Ras Siyyan peninsula.

West Island lies about 4.5 kilometres (2.8 mi) east from the Siyyan peninsula and 6.0 kilometres (3.7 mi) northeast from the coast of Djibouti.

All the islets are surrounded by reefs. All are brownish, except Big Island, which is yellowish. There is a masonry marker on the summit of Big Island.

=== Important Bird Area ===
The archipelago has been designated an Important Bird Area (IBA) by BirdLife International because it supports a breeding colony of lesser and greater crested terns.

=== Climate ===
The warmest month of the year is July with an average temperature of 39.0 °C. The archipelago consists of the main island of Kaḏḏa Dâbali, the five smaller islands of Ounḏa Dâbali, H̱amra, Tolka, H̱orod le ‘Ale, and Ounḏa Kômaytou, as well as small rock outcrops that are uninhabitable for humans but important for seabirds. The sky is always clear and bright throughout the year. The climate of Seven Brothers Islands is classified in the Köppen climate classification as BWh, meaning a desert climate with a mean annual temperature over 29 °C or 84 °F.

Climate data for Seven Brothers Islands
Month	Jan	Feb	Mar	Apr	May	Jun	Jul	Aug	Sep	Oct	Nov	Dec	Year
Mean daily maximum °C (°F)	29.8 (85.6)	29.8 (85.6)	31.4 (88.5)	33.2 (91.8)	35.6 (96.1)	38.2 (100.8)	39.0 (102.2)	38.3 (100.9)	37.1 (98.8)	34.4 (93.9)	31.8 (89.2)	30.3 (86.5)	34.1 (93.3)
Mean daily minimum °C (°F)	22.6 (72.7)	23.4 (74.1)	24.4 (75.9)	25.8 (78.4)	27.9 (82.2)	30.1 (86.2)	30.2 (86.4)	29.4 (84.9)	29.5 (85.1)	26.5 (79.7)	23.8 (74.8)	22.7 (72.9)	26.4 (79.4)
Average rainfall mm (inches)	4 (0.2)	3 (0.1)	6 (0.2)	4 (0.2)	1 (0.0)	0 (0)	5 (0.2)	6 (0.2)	12 (0.5)	4 (0.2)	4 (0.2)	4 (0.2)	53 (2.2)
Source: World Weather
