= Ras Menheli =

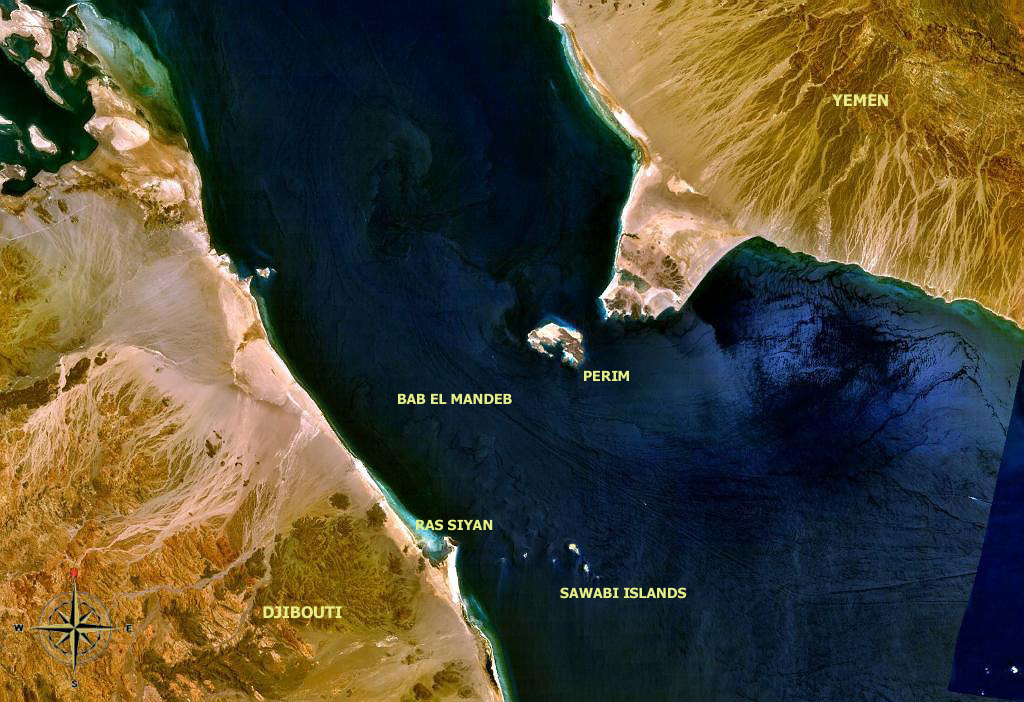
Bab-el-Mandeb area with description

Ras Menheli is a point in Yemen on the coast of Bab-el-Mandeb close to the island of Perim.
