= Ras Siyyan =

Peninsula in Obock Region, Djibouti

Coordinates: 12.4753°N 43.3217°E

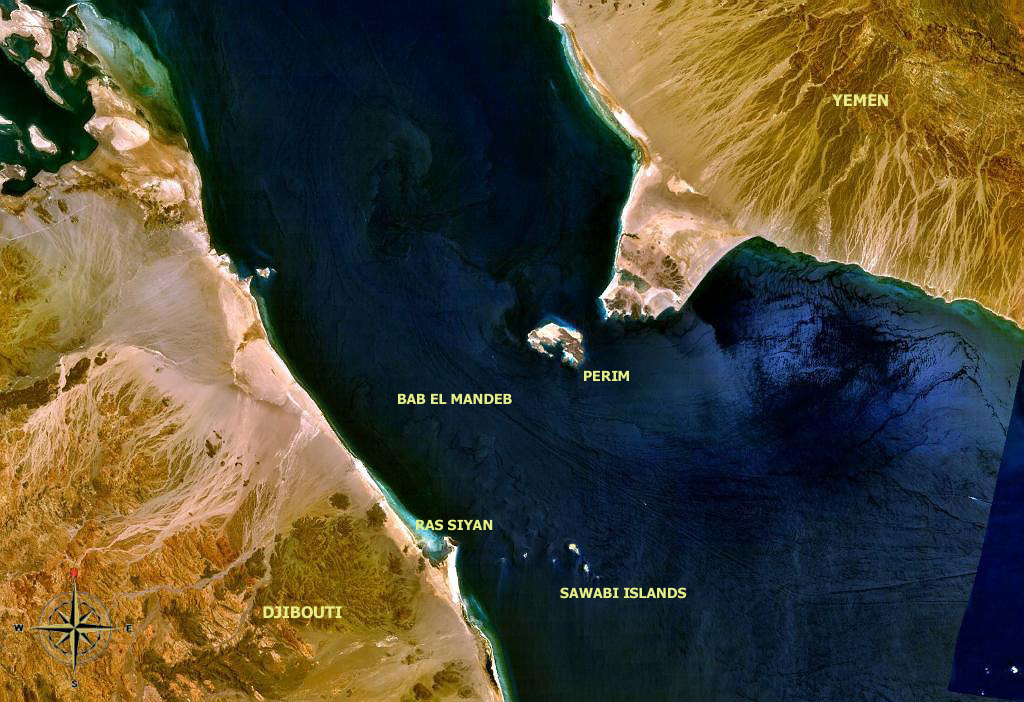
Ras Siyyan in the Bab-el-Mandeb area.

Ras Siyyan or Ras Siyan (Arabic: رأس سيان) is a peninsula in the Obock Region of Djibouti, on the Bab-el-Mandeb strait (between the Red Sea and the Gulf of Aden), about 20 km southwest of Perim Island.

The peninsula consists of a reddish volcanic hill about 1.2 by 0.5 km and 138 m high, connected towards to the mainland by a low sandy strip that stretches south by about 5 km while widening from 500 to 800 m. The Ras Siyyan volcano is currently inactive but young, having erupted through a 21,000-year-old coral reef formation.

To the west of Ras Siyyan there is a shallow marshy bay or lagoon, about 2.5 km wide, protected on the north side by shallow coral banks. The bay is fringed with patches of mangrove bushes (Avicennia marina), in spite of the little input of freshwater. Abundant sea grasses (chiefly Halodule and Thalassia species) form large beds in the bay, and Sharks breed there in October. An isolated white rock, Rocher Siyyan, lies in the bay about 800 m southwest of the volcanic hill.

The hill of Ras Siyyan is sometimes considered the seventh of the Seven Brothers (Sawabi) islands; the other six lie from about 4.5 km to 14.5 km to the east.
