= Red Sea =

Arm of the Indian Ocean between Asia and Africa

- Interactive map of Red Sea
- Map of the Red Sea
- Location: North Africa, East Africa, and West Asia
- Coordinates: 22°N 38°E
- Type: Sea
- Primary inflows: Gulf of Aden, Gulf of Suez
- Primary outflows: Bab-el-Mandeb, Suez Canal
- Basin countries: Djibouti; Egypt; Eritrea; Israel; Jordan; Saudi Arabia; Sudan; Yemen
- Max. length: 2,250 km (1,400 mi)
- Max. width: 355 km (221 mi)
- Surface area: 438,000 km^{2} (169,000 sq mi)
- Average depth: 490 m (1,610 ft)
- Max. depth: 2,730 m (8,960 ft)
- Water volume: 233,000 km^{3} (56,000 cu mi)

The Red Sea is a mediterranean sea lying between the Arabian Peninsula and Africa. It is an inlet of the Indian Ocean. Its connection to the ocean is in the south, through the Bab-el-Mandeb Strait and the Gulf of Aden. To the north of the Red Sea lies the Sinai Peninsula, the Gulf of Aqaba, and the Gulf of Suez, which leads to the Suez Canal. It is underlain by the Red Sea Rift, which is part of the Great Rift Valley.

The Red Sea has a surface area of roughly 438,000 km^{2} (169,000 sq mi), is about 2,250 km (1,400 mi) long, and 355 km (221 mi) across at its widest point. It has an average depth of 490 m (1,610 ft), and in the central Suakin Trough, it reaches its maximum depth of 2,730 m (8,960 ft).

The Red Sea is quite shallow, with approximately 40% of its area being less than 100 m (330 ft) deep, and approximately 25% being less than 50 m (160 ft) deep. The extensive shallow shelves are noted for their marine life and corals. More than 1,000 invertebrate species and 200 types of soft and hard coral live in the sea. The Red Sea is the world's northernmost tropical sea and has been designated a Global 200 ecoregion.

== Extent ==
The International Hydrographic Organization defines the limits of the Red Sea as follows:

On the North. The Southern limits of the Gulfs of Suez [A line running from Ràs Muhammed (27°43'N) to the South point of Shadwan Island (34°02'E) and thence Westward on a parallel (27°27'N) to the coast of Africa] and Aqaba [A line running from Ràs al Fasma Southwesterly to Requin Island (27°57′N 34°36′E) through Tiran Island to the Southwest point thereof and thence Westward on a parallel (27°54'N) to the coast of the Sinai Peninsula]. On the South. A line joining Husn Murad (12°40′N 43°30′E) and Ras Siyyan (12°29′N 43°20′E).

== Exclusive economic zone ==
Exclusive economic zones in Red Sea:

| Number | Country | Area (Km^{2}) |
|---|---|---|
| 1 | Saudi Arabia | 186,392 |
| 2 | Sudan | 92,513 |
| 3 | Egypt | 91,279 |
| 4 | Eritrea | 78,383 |
| 5 | Yemen | 35,861 |
| 6 | Djibouti | 7,037 |
| Total | Red Sea | 491,465 |

Note: Hala'ib Triangle disputed between Sudan and Egypt and calculated for both.

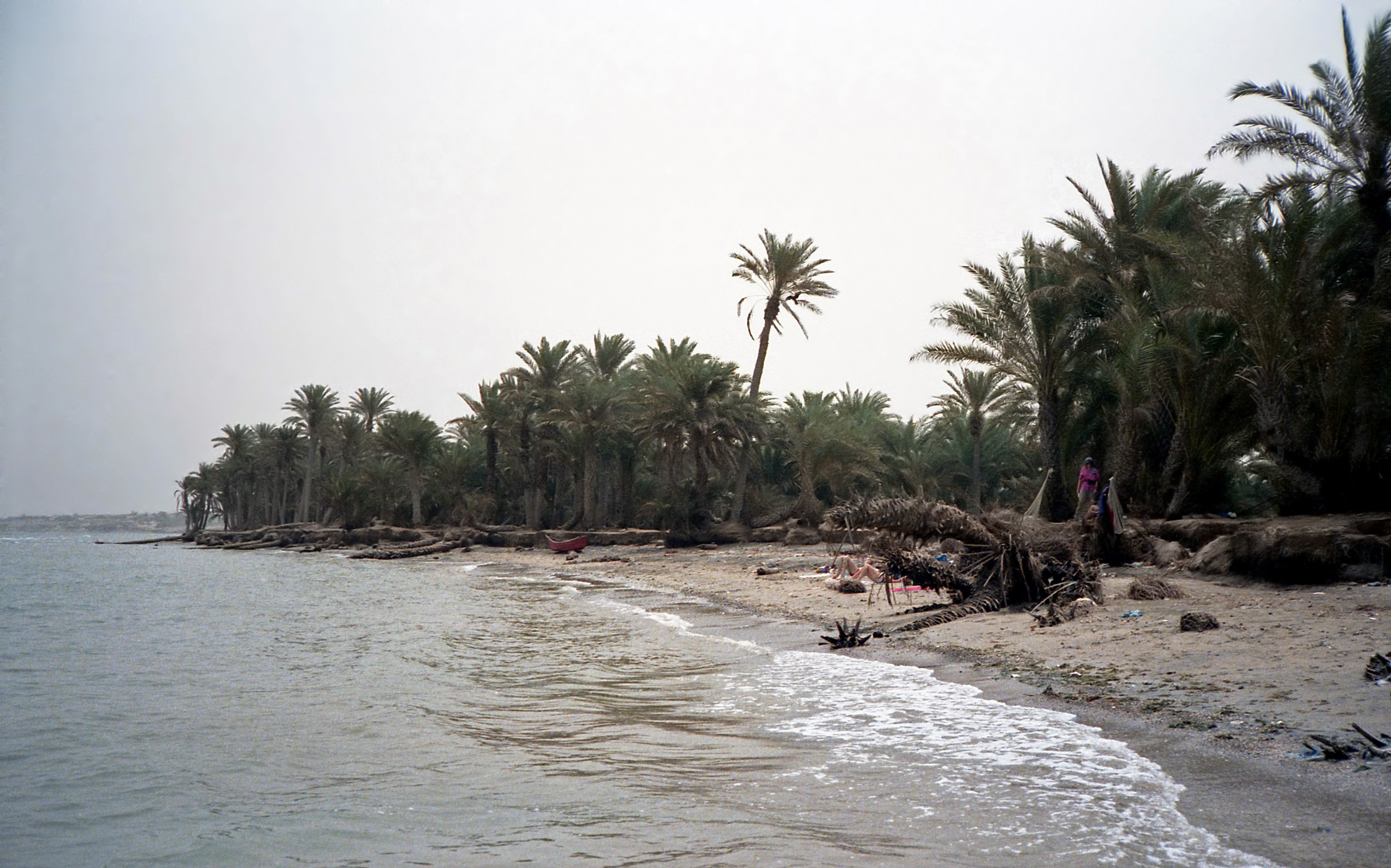
Tihama on the Red Sea near Khaukha, Yemen

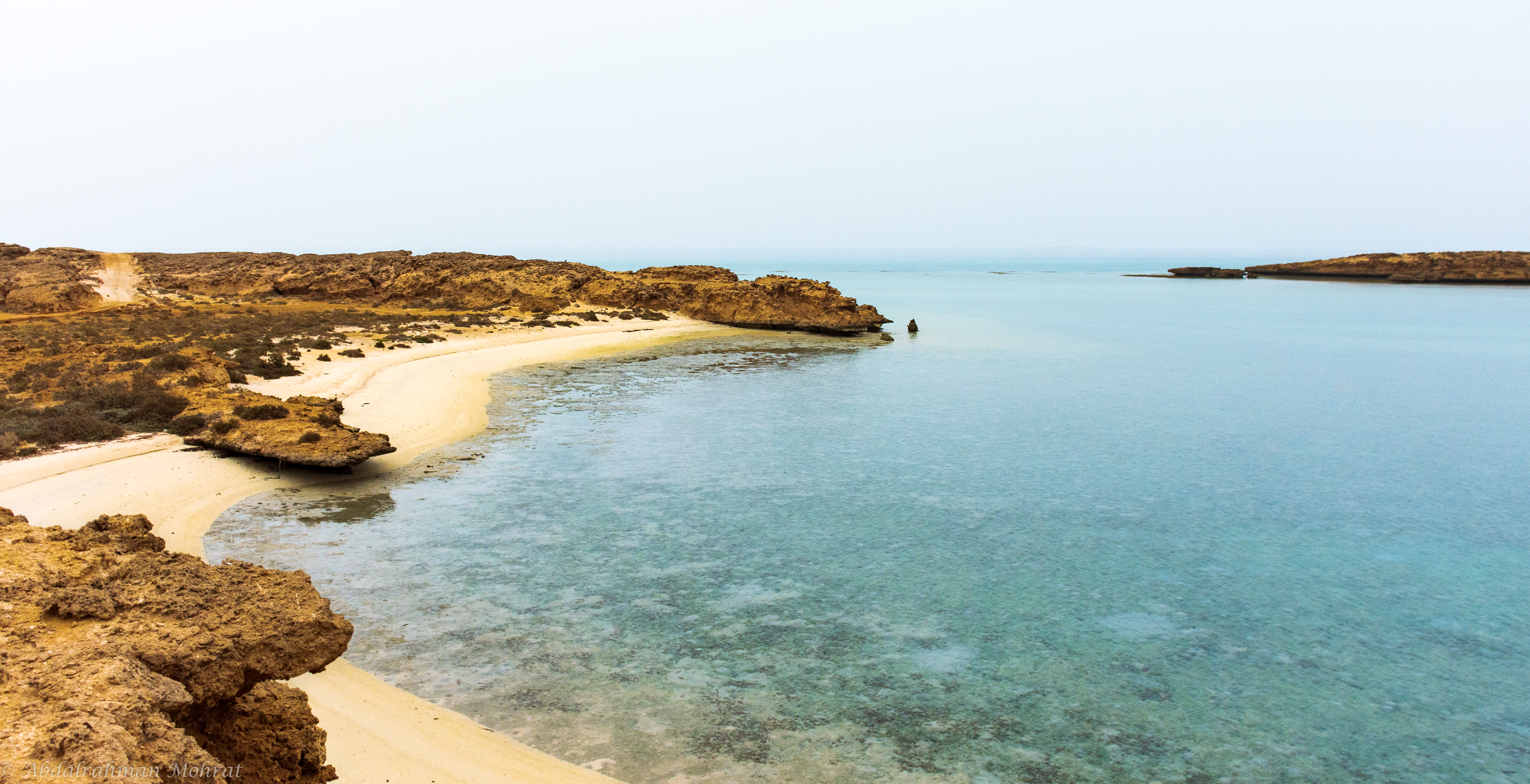
Red Sea coast seen from Farasan Islands

== Name ==
The Red Sea has names in many languages of the region:

- Modern Standard Arabic: البحر الأحمر, romanized: al-Baḥr al-ʾAḥmar; Medieval Arabic: بحر القلزم, romanized: Baḥr al-Qulzum;
- Hebrew: הַיָּם הָאָדוֹם, romanized: hayYām hāʾĀḏōm; Biblical Hebrew: יַם־סוּף, romanized: Yam Sūf
- Coptic: ⲫⲓⲟⲙ ⲛ̀ϩⲁϩ, romanized: Phiom Enhah, or ⲫⲓⲟⲙ ⲛ̀ϣⲁⲣⲓ, Phiom ǹšari
- Tigrinya: ቀይሕ ባሕሪ, romanized: Qeyyiḥ bāḥrī
- Somali: Badda Cas
- Afar: Qasa Bad

The English term Red Sea is a direct translation of the Ancient Greek Erythrà Thálassa (Ἐρυθρὰ Θάλασσα). The sea itself was once referred to as the Erythraean Sea by Europeans. As well as Mare Rubrum in Latin—alternatively, Sinus Arabicus (lit. 'Arabian Gulf')—the Romans called it Pontus Herculis (lit. 'Sea of Hercules'). Other designations include the Arabic البحر الأحمر (Al-Baḥr Al-Aḥmar; alternatively, بحر القلزم, Baḥr Al-Qulzum, 'the Sea of Clysma'); the Coptic ⲫⲓⲟⲙ ̀ⲛϣⲁⲣⲓ (Phiom ̀nšari); the Syriac ܝܡܐ ܣܘܡܩܐ (Yammāʾ summāqā); the Somali Badda Cas; and the Tigrinya ቀይሕ ባሕሪ (Qeyyiḥ bāḥrī). The name of the sea may signify the seasonal blooms of the red-coloured Trichodesmium erythraeum near the water's surface. A theory favored by some modern scholars is that the name red refers to the direction south, just as the Black Sea's name may refer to the north. The basis of this theory is that some Pre-Indo-European languages used color words to refer to the cardinal directions. Writing in the fifth century BCE, Herodotus uses the Red Sea and Southern Sea interchangeably.

The term Yam Suph (יַם־סוּף, 'Sea of Reeds') derives from the tale of God's parting of the Red Sea for the Israelites. Historically, it was also known to Western geographers as Mare Mecca ('Sea of Mecca') and Sinus Arabicus ('Arabian Gulf'). Some ancient geographers also called the Red Sea the "Arabian Gulf" or the "Gulf of Arabia".

== History ==
=== Ancient era ===
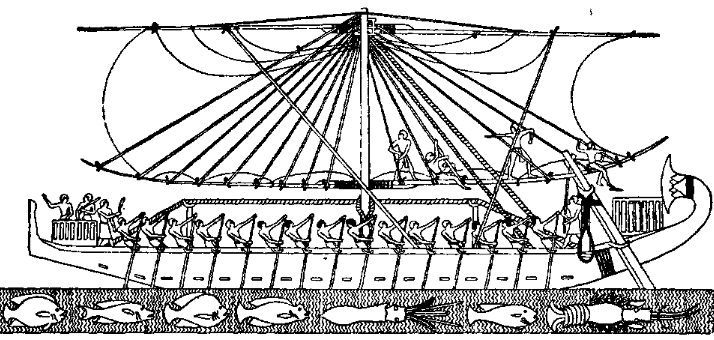
Ancient Egyptian expedition to the Land of Punt on the Red Sea coast during the reign of Queen Hatshepsut

The earliest known exploration of the Red Sea was conducted by ancient Egyptians, as they attempted to establish commercial routes to Punt. One such expedition took place around 2500 BCE and another around 1500 BCE (by Hatshepsut). Both involved long voyages down the Red Sea.

The Hebrew Biblical Book of Exodus relates the account of the Israelites' crossing the Red Sea, which the Hebrew text calls Yam Suph (יַם־סוּף). Yam Suph was traditionally identified as the Red Sea. Rabbi Saadia Gaon (882‒942 CE), in his Judeo-Arabic translation of the Torah, identifies the crossing place of the Red Sea as Baḥar al-Qulzum, meaning the "Gulf of Suez".

In the 6th century BC, Darius the Great of Persia sent reconnaissance missions to the Red Sea, improving and extending navigation by locating many hazardous rocks and currents. A canal was built by Darius the Great between the Nile and the northern end of the Red Sea at Suez. In the late 4th century BC, Alexander the Great sent Greek naval expeditions down the Red Sea to the Indian Ocean. Greek navigators continued to explore and compile data on the Red Sea. Agatharchides collected information about the sea in the 2nd century BC. The Periplus of the Erythraean Sea ("Periplus of the Red Sea"), a Greek periplus written by an unknown author around the 1st century, contains a detailed description of the Red Sea's ports and sea routes. The Periplus also describes how Hippalus first discovered the direct route from the Red Sea to India.

Settlements and commercial centres in the vicinity of the Red Sea involved in the spice trade, as described in the Periplus of the Erythraean Sea

In the late 4th century BCE, Alexander the Great sent Greek naval expeditions down the Red Sea to the Indian Ocean. Greek navigators continued to explore and compile data on the Red Sea. Agatharchides collected information about the sea in the 2nd century BCE. The Periplus of the Erythraean Sea (or Periplus of the Red Sea), a Greek periplus written by an unknown author around the 1st century, contains a detailed description of the Red Sea's ports and sea routes. The Periplus also describes how Hippalus first discovered the direct route from the Red Sea to India.

The Red Sea was favored for Roman trade with India starting with the reign of Augustus, when the Roman Empire gained control over the Mediterranean, Egypt, and the northern Red Sea. The route had been used by previous states, but traffic volume increased under the Romans. From Indian ports, goods from China were introduced to the Roman world. Contact between Rome and China depended on the Red Sea, but the route was broken by the Aksumite Empire around the 3rd century CE. From antiquity until the 20th century, the Red Sea was also a trade route for the Red Sea slave trade from Africa to the Middle East.

=== Middle Ages and modern era ===
During the Middle Ages, the Red Sea was an important part of the spice trade route. In 1183, Raynald of Châtillon launched a raid down the Red Sea to attack the Muslim pilgrim convoys to Mecca. The possibility that Raynald's fleet might sack the holy cities of Mecca and Medina caused fury throughout the Muslim world. However, it appears that Raynald's target was the lightly armed Muslim pilgrim convoys, rather than the well-guarded cities of Mecca and Medina, and the belief in the Muslim world that Raynald was seeking to sack the holy cities, due to the proximity of those cities to the areas that Raynald raided.

In 1513, trying to secure that channel to Portugal, Afonso de Albuquerque laid siege to Aden but was forced to retreat. They cruised the Red Sea through the Bab al-Mandab, as the first fleet from Europe in modern times to sail these waters. Later in 1524, the city was delivered to Governor Heitor da Silveira as an agreement for protection from the Ottoman Empire.

In 1798, France ordered General Napoleon I to invade Egypt and take control of the Red Sea. Although he failed in his mission, the engineer Jean-Baptiste Lepère, who took part in it, revitalised the plan for a canal which had been envisaged during the reign of the pharaohs. Several canals were built in ancient times from the Nile to the Red Sea along or near the line of the present Sweet Water Canal, but none lasted for long. The Suez Canal was opened in November 1869. During the first half of the 20th century, the Red Sea slave trade attracted substantial international condemnation.

After the Second World War, the Americans and Soviets exerted their influence whilst the volume of oil tanker traffic intensified. However, the Six-Day War culminated in the closure of the Suez Canal from 1967 to 1975. Despite the patrols by the major maritime fleets in the waters of the Red Sea, the Suez Canal has never recovered its supremacy over the Cape route, which is believed to be less vulnerable to piracy.

=== Red Sea crisis ===
Iranian-backed Yemeni Houthis have attacked Western ships, including warships, next to the Bab al-Mandeb during the Gaza war. One ship was hijacked and taken back to Yemen.

== Oceanography ==
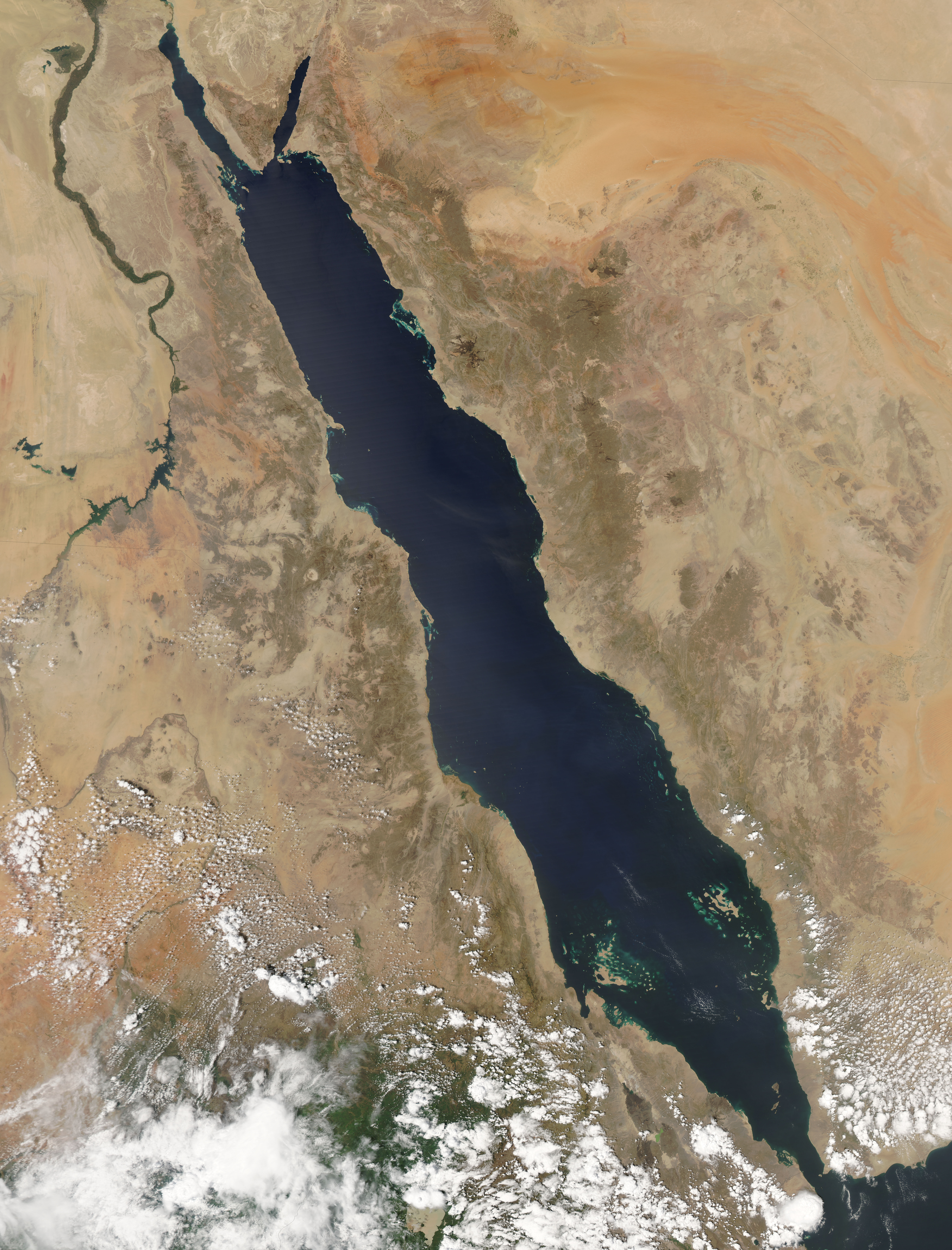
Red Sea image from NASA

This video over the south-eastern Mediterranean Sea and down the coastline of the Red Sea was taken by the crew of Expedition 29 on board the International Space Station.

The Red Sea is between arid land, desert and semi-desert. Many regions of the coastal zone of the Red Sea possess large areas of vigorously growing coral and extensive reef complexes. Due to the tidal currents, low human population, and the minimal development in this climatically inhospitable region, the Red Sea coral reefs are some of the healthiest reef environments in the world. The Red Sea water mass-exchanges its water with the Arabian Sea and Indian Ocean via the Gulf of Aden. These physical factors reduce the effect of high salinity caused by evaporation in the north and relatively hot water in the south.

The climate of the Red Sea is the result of two monsoon seasons: a northeasterly monsoon and a southwesterly monsoon. Monsoon winds occur because of differential heating between the land and the sea. Very high surface temperatures and high salinity make this one of the warmest and saltiest bodies of seawater in the world. The average surface water temperature of the Red Sea during the summer is about 26 °C (79 °F) in the north and 30 °C (86 °F) in the south, with only about 2 °C (3.6 °F) variation during the winter months. The overall average water temperature is 22 °C (72 °F). Temperature and visibility remain good, with visibility around 200 m (660 ft). The sea is known for its strong winds and unpredictable local currents.

The rainfall over the Red Sea and its coasts is extremely low, averaging 60 mm (2.36 in) per year. The rain is mostly short showers, often with thunderstorms and occasionally with dust storms. The scarcity of rainfall and no major source of fresh water to the Red Sea result in excess evaporation as high as 2,050 mm (81 in) per year and high salinity with minimal seasonal variation. A recent underwater expedition to the Red Sea offshore from Sudan and Eritrea found surface water temperatures 28 °C (82 °F) in winter and up to 34 °C (93 °F) in the summer, but despite that extreme heat, the coral was healthy with much fish life with very little sign of coral bleaching, with only 9% infected by Thalassomonas loyana, the 'white plague' agent. Favia favus coral there harbours a virus, BA3, which kills T. loyana. Scientists are investigating the unique properties of these corals and their commensal algae to determine whether they can be used to rescue bleached corals elsewhere.

=== Salinity ===
The Red Sea is one of the saltiest bodies of water in the world, owing to high evaporation and low precipitation; no significant rivers or streams drain into the sea, and its southern connection to the Gulf of Aden, an arm of the Indian Ocean, is narrow. Its salinity ranges from between ~36 ‰ in the southern part and 41 ‰ in the northern part around the Gulf of Suez, with an average of 40 ‰. (Average salinity for the world's seawater is ~35 ‰ on the Practical Salinity Scale, or PSU; that translates to 3.5% of actual dissolved salts).

=== Tidal range ===
In general, tide ranges between 0.6 m (2.0 ft) in the north, near the mouth of the Gulf of Suez and 0.9 m (3.0 ft) in the south near the Gulf of Aden, but it fluctuates between 0.20 m (0.66 ft) and 0.30 m (0.98 ft) away from the nodal point. The central Red Sea (Jeddah area) is therefore almost tideless, and as such, the annual water level changes are more significant. Because of the small tidal range, the water during high tide inundates the coastal sabkhas as a thin sheet of water up to a few hundred metres rather than flooding the sabkhas through a network of channels. However, south of Jeddah in the Shoiaba area, the water from the lagoon may cover the adjoining sabkhas as far as 3 km (2 mi), whereas north of Jeddah in the Al-Kharrar area the sabkhas are covered by a thin sheet of water as far as 2 km (1.2 mi). The prevailing north- and northeast winds influence the movement of water from coastal inlets into adjacent sabkhas, especially during storms. Winter mean sea level is 0.5 m (1.6 ft) higher than in summer. Tidal velocities passing through constrictions caused by reefs, sand bars, and low islands commonly exceed 1–2 m/s (3–7 ft/s). Coral reefs in the Red Sea are near Egypt, Eritrea, Jordan, Israel, Saudi Arabia, and Sudan.

=== Current ===
Detailed information regarding current data is lacking, partially because the currents are weak and both spatially and temporally variable. The variation of temporal and spatial currents is as low as 0.5 m (1.6 ft) and is governed by the wind. During the summer, northwesterly winds drive surface water south for about four months at a velocity of 15–20 cm/s (6–8 in/s), whereas in winter the flow is reversed, resulting in the inflow of water from the Gulf of Aden into the Red Sea. The net value of the latter predominates, leading to an overall drift toward the north end of the Red Sea. Generally, the velocity of the tidal current is 50–60 cm/s (20–24 in/s) with a maximum of 1 m/s (3.3 ft/s) at the mouth of the al-Kharrar Lagoon. However, the range of the north-northeast current along the Saudi coast is 8–29 cm/s (3–11 in/s).

=== Wind regime ===
The northern part of the Red Sea is dominated by persistent north-west winds, with speeds ranging between 7 km/h (4.3 mph) and 12 km/h (7.5 mph). The rest of the Red Sea and the Gulf of Aden are subjected to regular and seasonally reversible winds. The wind regime is characterized by seasonal and regional variations in speed and direction with average speed generally increasing northward.

The wind is the driving force in the Red Sea, transporting material as suspended load or bedload. Wind-induced currents play an important role in the Red Sea by resuspending bottom sediments and transferring materials from dumping sites to burial sites in a quiescent depositional environment. Wind-generated current measurement is therefore important for determining sediment dispersal patterns and their role in the erosion and accretion of the coastal rock exposure and submerged coral beds.

== Geology ==
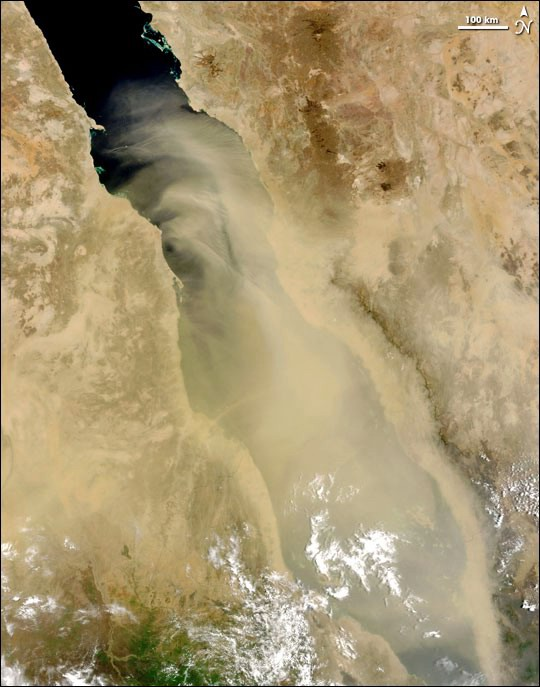
Dust storm over the Red Sea

The Red Sea was formed by the Arabian Peninsula being split from the Horn of Africa by the movement of the Red Sea Rift. This split started in the Eocene and accelerated during the Oligocene. The sea is still widening (in 2005, following three weeks of tectonic activity. It had grown by 8 m [26 ft]), and it is considered that it will become an ocean in time (as proposed in the model of John Tuzo Wilson). In 1949, a deep water survey reported anomalously hot brines in the central portion of the Red Sea. Later work in the 1960s confirmed the presence of hot, 60 °C (140 °F), saline brines and associated metalliferous muds. The hot solutions were emanating from an active subseafloor rift. Lake Asal in Djibouti is eligible as an experimental site to study the evolution of the deep hot brines of the Red Sea. By observing the strontium isotope composition of the Red Sea brines, it is possible to deduce how these salt waters found at the bottom of the Red Sea could have evolved in a similar way to Lake Asal, which ideally represents their compositional extreme. The high salinity of the waters was not hospitable to living organisms.

Sometime during the Tertiary, the Bab el Mandeb closed, and the Red Sea evaporated to an empty hot dry salt-floored sink. Effects causing this would have been:

- A "race" between the Red Sea widening and Perim Island erupting filling the Bab el Mandeb with lava.
- The lowering of world sea level during Ice ages because of much water being locked up in the ice caps.

Several volcanic islands rise from the center of the sea. Most are dormant. However, in 2007, Jabal al-Tair island in the Bab el Mandeb strait erupted violently. Two new islands were formed in 2011 and 2013 in the Zubair Archipelago, a small chain of islands owned by Yemen. The first island, Sholan Island, emerged in an eruption in December 2011, and the second island, Jadid, emerged in September 2013. Approximately 40% of the Red Sea is quite shallow at less than 100 m (330 ft) deep, with about 25% less than 50 m (160 ft) deep.

=== Oil and gas ===
Undiscovered oil reserves in the region have been estimated at 801.5 million cubic metres (5,041 million barrels). Undiscovered gas reserves in the region have been estimated at 3,180 billion cubic metres (112,349 billion cubic feet). Undiscovered natural gas reserves have been estimated at 489 million cubic metres (3,077 million barrels). Most of these plays are controlled by the structure of the basin. Normal faults are common as the Red Sea occupies an active diverging margin. These targets are commonly found below the Salt deposits of the Middle Miocene.

Modern development is focused on the following fields. The Durwara 2 Field was discovered in 1963, while the Suakin 1 Field and the Bashayer 1A Field were discovered in 1976, on the Egyptian side of the Red Sea. The Barqan Field was discovered in 1969, and the Midyan Field in 1992, both within the Midyan Basin on the Saudi Arabian side of the Red Sea. The 20-m thick Middle Miocene Maqna Formation is an oil source rock in the basin. Oil seeps occur near the Farasan Islands, the Dahlak Archipelago, along the coast of Eritrea, and in the southeastern Red Sea along the coasts of Saudi Arabia and Yemen.

=== Mineral resources ===
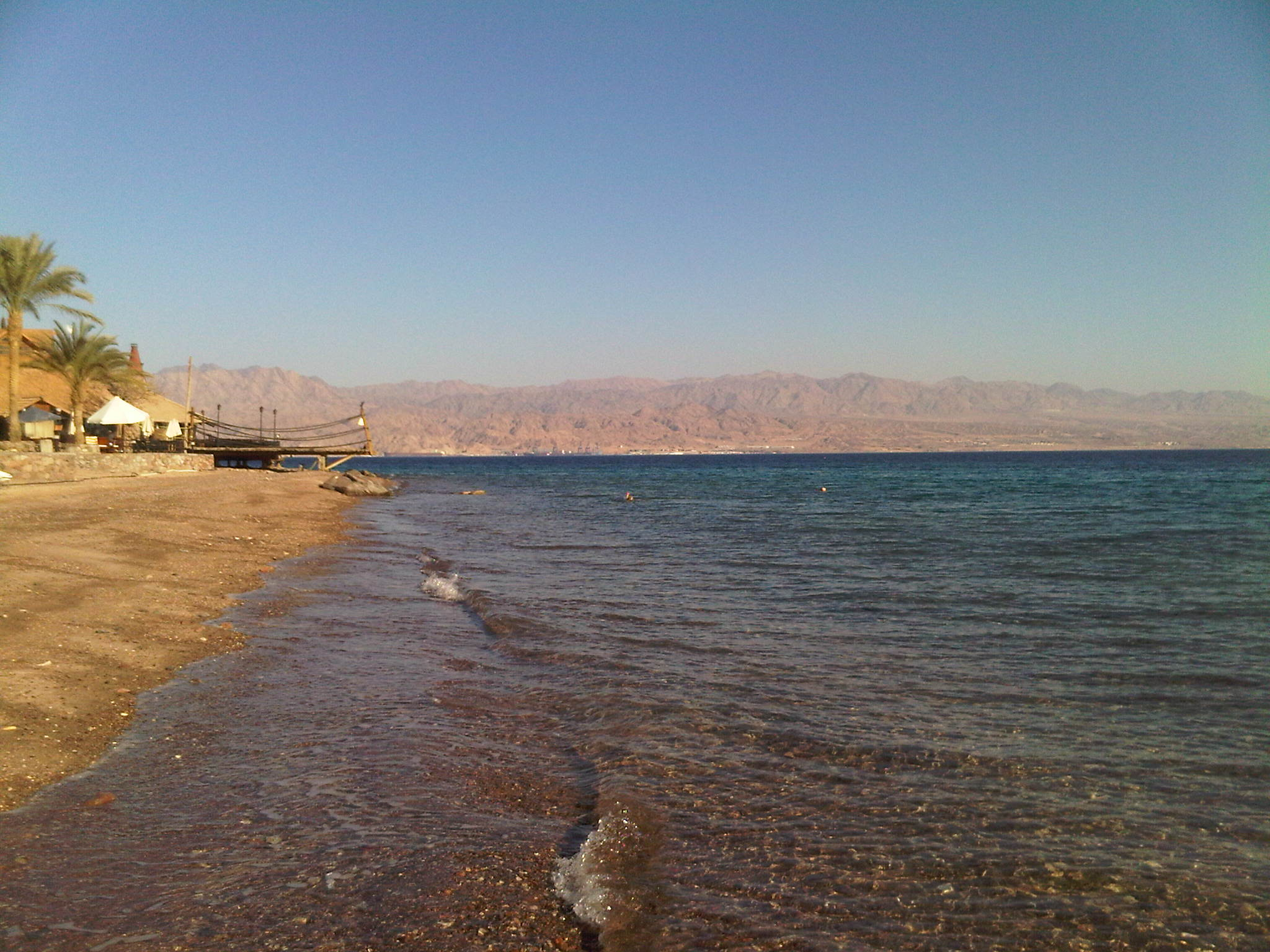
Red Sea coast in Taba, Egypt

In terms of mineral resources, the major constituents of the Red Sea sediments are as follows:

Biogenic constituents
Nanofossils, foraminifera, pteropods, siliceous fossils
Volcanogenic constituents
Tuffites, volcanic ash, montmorillonite, cristobalite, zeolites
Terrigenous constituents
Quartz, feldspars, rock fragments, mica, heavy minerals, clay minerals
Authigenic minerals
Sulfide minerals, aragonite, calcite, protodolomite, dolomite, quartz, chalcedony
Evaporite minerals
Magnesite, gypsum, anhydrite, halite, polyhalite
Brine precipitate
Fe-montmorillonite, goethite, hematite, siderite, rhodochrosite, pyrite, sphalerite, anhydrite

== Ecosystem ==
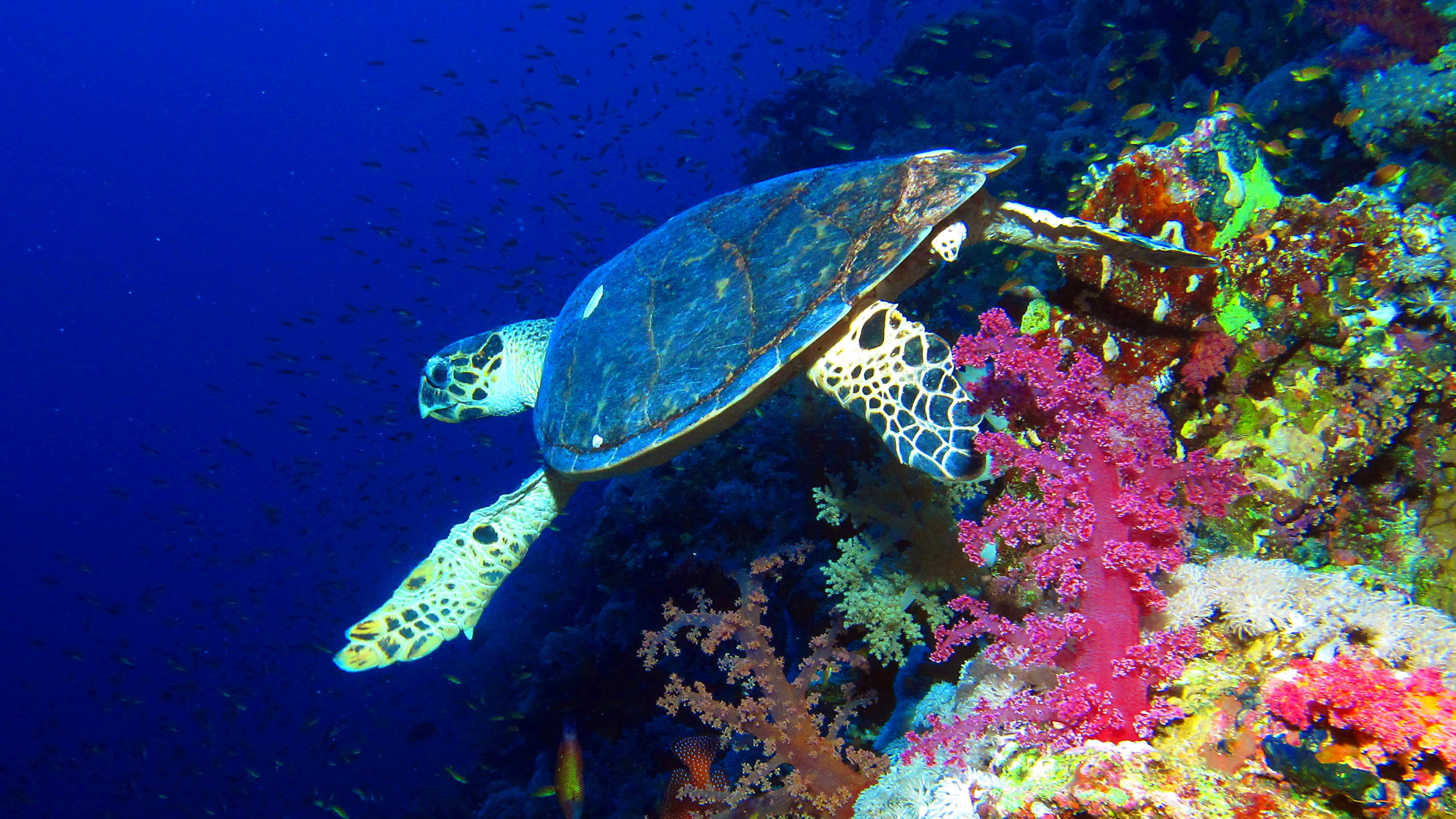
Hawksbill sea turtle in the Elphinstone Reef

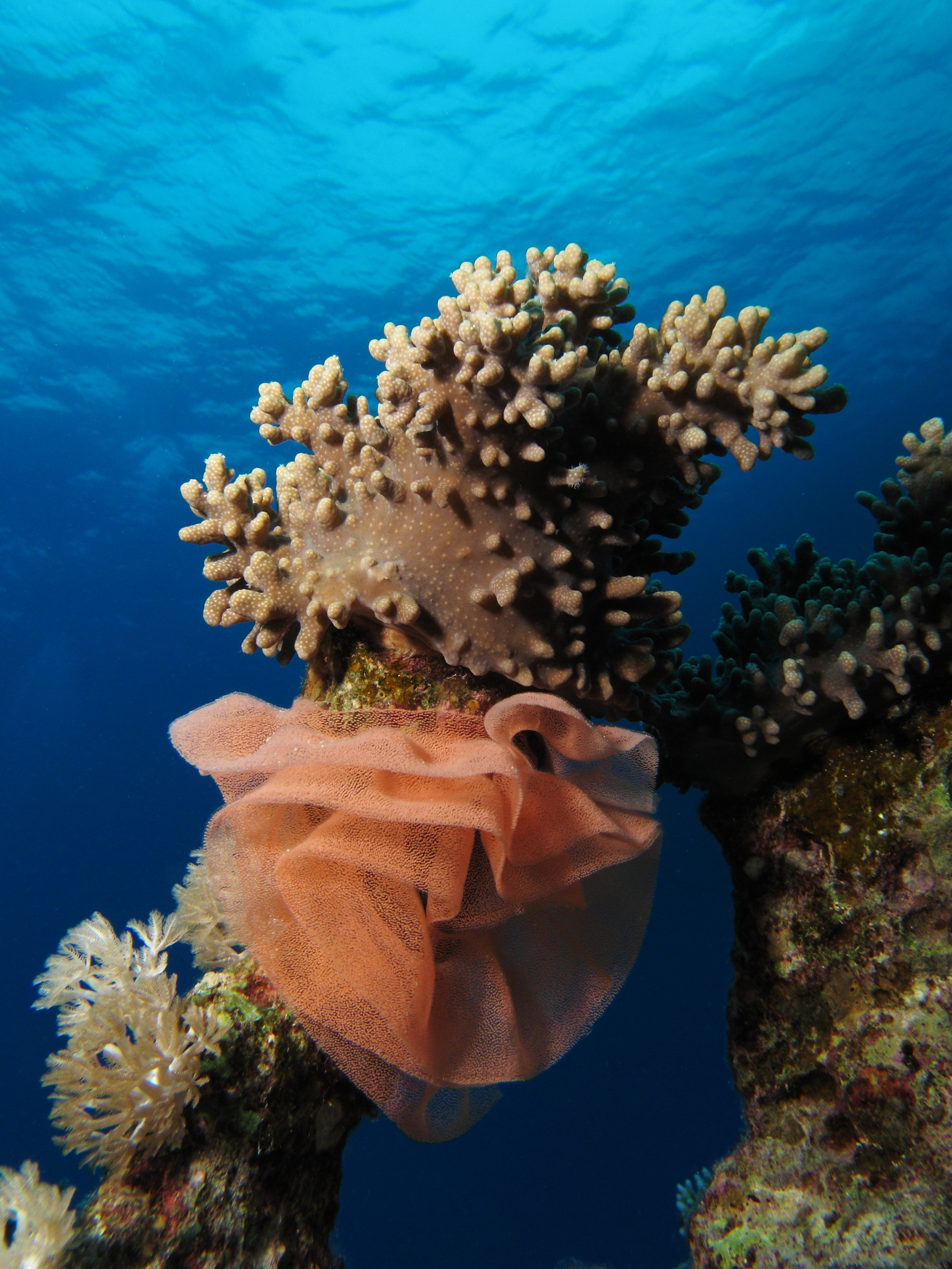
Nudibranch egg ribbon at Shaab Mahmoud

The Red Sea is a rich and diverse ecosystem. For example, more than 1200 fish species have been recorded in the Red Sea, of which 10% are endemic, found nowhere else.

Since the opening of the Suez Canal in November 1869, over a thousand marine species from the Red Sea—from plankton, seaweeds, invertebrates to fish—have migrated northward and settled in the Mediterranean Sea. To the point that a number of them now form a significant component of the Mediterranean ecosystem. The resulting change in biodiversity, without precedent in human memory, is currently accelerating, in particular for fishes according to surveys engaged by the Mediterranean Science Commission.

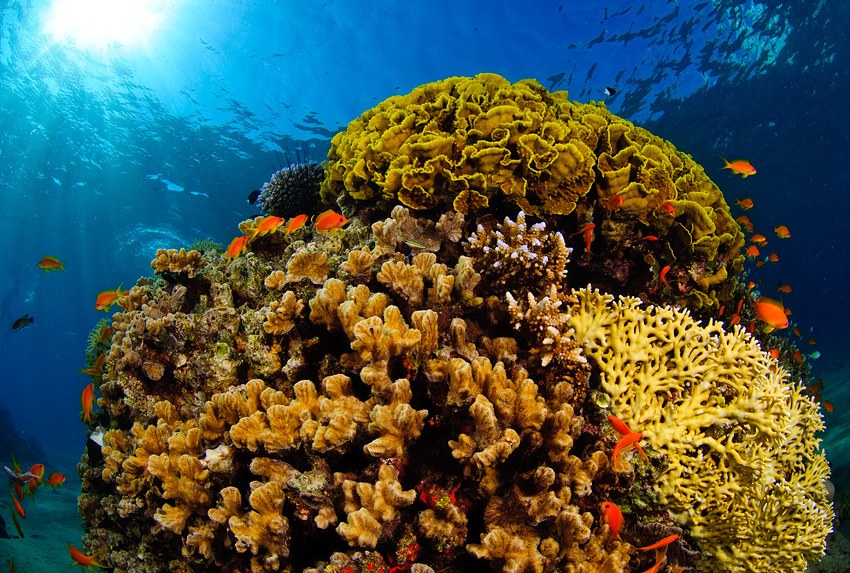
Red Sea coral and marine fish

The rich diversity of the Red Sea is in part due to the 2,000 km (1,240 mi) of coral reef extending along its coastline; these fringing reefs are 5000–7000 years old and are largely formed of stony acropora and porite corals. The reefs form platforms and sometimes lagoons along the coast, and occasionally other features such as cylinders (e.g., the Blue Hole (Red Sea) at Dahab).

The Red Sea also hosts many offshore reefs, including several true atolls. Many of the unusual offshore reef formations defy classic (i.e., Darwinian) coral reef classification schemes and are generally attributed to the high levels of tectonic activity that characterize the area. Both offshore and coastal reefs are visited by pelagic species of fish, including many of the 44 recorded species of shark, and by many species (over 175) of nudibranch, many of which are endemic to the Red Sea. Other coastal Red Sea habitats include seagrass beds, salt pans, mangroves and salt marshes. Furthermore, the deep Red Sea brine pools have been extensively studied for their microbial life, characterized by their diversity and adaptation to extreme environments.

The high marine biodiversity of the area is recognized by the Egyptian government, which set up the Ras Mohammed National Park in 1983. The rules and regulations governing this area protect local marine life. Ras Mohammed is one of the world's top 10 sites recognized by the International Union for Conservation of Nature for effective management of marine ecosystems, and the first marine protected area in Africa and the Middle East.

Due to the high volume of maritime traffic, which accounts for 12–15% of global trade, the Red Sea is considered highly vulnerable to marine pollution, particularly oil spills. Academic literature has increasingly focused on both past disasters and predictive modelling. Studies have modelled spill trajectories and their environmental consequences. Others have analysed the ecological impact of spills on coral reefs and marine biodiversity and assessed how chemical dispersants and specific oil compounds affect marine fauna and coastal ecosystems. Public health literature has raised concerns over the spill's impact on respiratory illness and waterborne contamination in coastal populations.

=== Crustaceans ===
- Alachosquilla vicina
- Hairy elbow crab
- Rusty guard crab
- Brown guard crab
- Indo-Pacific hairy hermit crab
- Grapsus granulosus
- Furrowed crab
- Tiny rock crab
- Soft coral spider crab
- Purple estuarine rock crab
- One-horned spider crab
- Soft coral crab
- Scaly rock crab
- Haig's porcelain crab
- Violet crab
- Ornamental spider crab
- Xenia swimming crab
- Reticulated hermit crab
- Showy xanthid crab
- Giant elbow crab
- White-handed fiddler crab
- Woodmason's hermit crab
- Inversed fiddler crab
- African blue swimming crab
- Rosy hermit crab
- Tetralia nigrolineata
- Setiferous hermit crab
- Hairy coral crab
- Maxima clam
- Fluted giant clam
- Red sea giant clam

=== Sea turtles ===
- Green sea turtle
- Hawksbill sea turtle

=== Dolphins ===
- Spinner dolphin
- Indo-Pacific bottlenose dolphin
- Common bottlenose dolphin
- Indian humpback dolphin
- Risso's dolphin
- Pantropical spotted dolphin

=== Fish ===
- Lyretail anthias (The most commonly found fish in the sea)
- Red Sea anemonefish
- Indian lionfish
- Klunzinger's wrasse
- Indian bullethead parrotfish
- Sohal tang
- Red Sea bannerfish
- Masked puffer
- Raccoon butterflyfish
- Sergeant major
- Giant moray eel
- Arabian Picasso triggerfish
- Rusty parrotfish
- White-spotted pufferfish
- Threadfin butterflyfish
- Lined bristletooth
- Bluespotted cornetfish
- Purple tang
- Coral grouper
- Crown butterflyfish
- Red Sea goatfish
- Indian Ocean humbug
- Titan triggerfish
- Yellow boxfish
- Threespot dascyllus
- Orangestripe triggerfish
- Emperor angelfish
- Yellow-edged lyretail
- Dusky surgeonfish
- Starry pufferfish
- Greasy rockrod grouper
- Napoleon fish
- Geometric moray eel
- Sharksucker (Also called a remora.)
- Golden-striped mackerel
- Great barracuda
- Panther flounder
- Doublebar bream
- Giant trevally
- Zigzag wrasse
- Dogtooth tuna
- Needlefish (Houndfish)
- Black-barred halfbeak
- Red Sea garden eel
- Smallscale scorpionfish
- Fringelip mullet
- Flathead pomfret
- Yellowfin tuna
- Mahi-mahi

=== Jellyfish and cnidarians ===
- Cauliflower jellyfish
- Mangrove upside-down jelly
- Amakusa jelly
- Pelagic purple jelly
- Nomad jellyfish
- Moon jellyfish

=== Sharks ===
- Tawny nurse shark
- Whale shark
- Tiger shark
- Whitetip reef shark
- Great hammerhead
- Blacktip reef shark
- Gray reef shark
- Pelagic thresher shark
- Spinner shark
- Silky shark
- Oceanic whitetip shark
- Spot-tail shark
- Longfin mako shark
- Sicklefin lemon shark
- Shortfin mako shark
- Zebra shark
- Bull shark
- Great white shark (exceptionally rare)

=== Billfish ===
- Swordfish
- Striped marlin
- Indo-Pacific sailfish

=== Octopuses and other cephalopods ===
- Day octopus
- Ornate night octopus
- Mimic octopus
- Marbled octopus
- Red Sea long-arm octopus
- Giant squid

=== Rays ===
- Cowtail stingray
- Porcupine ray
- Ornate eagle ray
- Reticulate whipray
- Sicklefin devil ray
- Bluespotted fantail ray
- Oceanic manta ray

=== Lobsters ===
- Pronghorn spiny lobster
- Painted spiny lobster

=== Whales ===
- False killer whale (one was discovered off the coast of Saudi Arabia in December 2024)
- Pygmy blue whale
- Bryde's whale (one was found in Al-Qunfudah)
- Blue whale (one was seen in the Gulf of Aqaba in 2018)
- Sperm whale
- Humpback whale (rare to see, as they enter the ocean through the Bab Al-Mandeb strait)

== Environmental impacts of the Red Sea crisis ==
Since November 2023, Houthi forces have conducted over 100 attacks against commercial and naval vessels, transforming the Red Sea into a high-risk zone for environmental disasters.

=== Pollution through oil and chemical spills ===
The sinking of the MV Rubymar in February 2024 created an 18-mile oil slick resulting from approximately 200 tons of heavy fuel oil and 80 tons of marine diesel oil. Additionally, the vessel was also carrying 21,000 metric tons of fertilizer, raising concerns about large-scale nutrient overloading that could trigger extensive algal blooms, potentially leading to seawater contamination and fish mortality. The vessel sank two weeks after being attacked by Houthi forces, posing risks to marine life, including coral reefs. The oil slick drifted toward Yemen's Farasan Islands and Eritrea's Dahlak Archipelago and posed a high threat to coastal communities, aquatic fauna and sensitive ecosystems in the region.

Similar oil spills forming around vessels have been reported following Houthi attacks. Some oil sinks to the ground while the rest follows the current and can be washed ashore where it affects flora and fauna. The August 2024 attacks on the Sounion tanker carrying 150,000 tons of crude oil represented a further threat, with salvage operations repeatedly hindered by Houthi interference before it was safely removed by the EU's Operation Aspides. The attacks on the MV Tutor in June 2024 and on the Chios Lion tanker in July 2024, generating a 136-mile oil slick, illustrate the systematic pattern of environmental damage from sustained maritime conflict to the Red Sea ecosystem.

=== Rising emissions through vessel rerouting ===
Container vessel traffic through the Suez Canal declined by approximately 75 percent in 2024 compared to 2023, as many shipping companies rerouted vessels around Africa's Cape of Good Hope. Ships that would normally transit through the Suez Canal now travel 50-60 percent longer distances. The rerouting adds around 4575 nautical miles to the sailing distance between Shanghai and Rotterdam, increasing voyage durations on average by 12 days. Thus, the rerouting leads to an increase in fuel consumption of up to 33 percent depending on speed, distance and the type of vessel. The resulting environmental impact manifests as approximately 40 percent increase in CO₂ emissions per voyage, with speed increases potentially amplifying emissions by an additional 14 percent. The longer round-trip schedules imply that fleets require at least two additional ships to ensure a weekly service. Those supplementary vessels also contribute to total fleet emissions, leading to a 67 percent increase in CO₂ emissions for a typical Asia-North Europe service operating weekly. Given that maritime shipping accounts for approximately 3 percent of global greenhouse gas emissions, the Red Sea crisis represents a setback to the international climate goal to reach net-zero emissions by or around 2050 and simultaneously makes it more difficult to comply with the long-term temperature goal set out in Article 2 of the Paris Agreement. While regional emissions at the Red Sea dropped 60 percent as fewer large vessels transit the waterway, this is offset by substantially increased global emissions resulting from longer rerouting.

Another discussed option for rerouting vessels is the Northern Sea Route, which would reduce sailing distance by up to 40 percent compared to the Red Sea route. This would pose significant ecological risks, including higher per-container emissions due to smaller ship sizes, increased black carbon pollution in the fragile Arctic, and disruption to marine ecosystems. Weak regulatory enforcement in the area and inadequate waste infrastructure further undermine the environmental sustainability of the Northern Sea Route.

=== Biodiversity loss and damage to marine life ===
The increase in shipping traffic via the Cape of Good Hope leads to underwater noise pollution on this route, which affects local fish stocks and marine mammals. Additionally, it results in increasing numbers of container losses. The region is associated with hazardous navigation conditions created by intersecting weather systems. In 2024, approximately 200 containers were lost along this passage, accounting for around 35 percent of all recorded container losses in that year.

Furthermore, military operations like Prosperity Guardian and Poseidon Archer have deployed naval forces from more than fifteen nations in the Red Sea region. Their military sonar systems can cause behavioral disruptions, habitat displacement, and physiological harm to marine life. Cetacean species in the Red Sea are particularly vulnerable to acoustic disturbances due to their reliance on echolocation and acoustic communication for critical life functions including navigation, foraging, and social bonding. In addition, the Houthis' implementation of naval mines to attack ships poses risks to marine ecosystems and coastal environments, particularly along the Yemeni coast.

=== Collapse of conservation governance ===
The Red Sea lacks a comprehensive regional environmental treaty comparable to, for example, the Barcelona Convention regarding the Mediterranean Sea. Environmental regulation is dispersed among national agencies and the regional Organization for the Conservation of the Environment of the Red Sea and Gulf of Aden (PERSGA). However, it has limited enforcement capacity as many coastal states lack resources for monitoring and rapid response. The region's Marine Protected Areas are characterized as poorly coordinated and weakly implemented even under conditions prior to the Red Sea crisis. Emergency cooperation efforts like the FSO Safer oil offloading in August 2023 and the successful salvage operation, led by the EU's Operation Aspides, regarding the attacks on the Sounion demonstrate potential for coordinated action against environmental threats in the region. At the same time, the inability to replicate such cooperation for the MV Rubymar incident reveals how active conflict constrains environmental response capacity.

== Desalination plants ==
There is extensive demand for desalinated water to meet the needs of the population and the industries along the Red Sea.

There are at least 18 desalination plants along the Red Sea coast of Saudi Arabia which discharge warm brine and treatment chemicals (chlorine and anti-scalants) that bleach and kill corals and cause diseases in the fish. This is only localized, but it may intensify with time and profoundly impact the fishing industry.

== Trade ==
The Red Sea serves an important role in the global economy, with cargo vessels traveling between the Indian Ocean and the Mediterranean Sea every year, thus shortening the path between Asia and Europe almost by half (as compared to traveling around Africa via the Atlantic Ocean). 12% of global trade passes through the Red Sea. This includes 30% of global container traffic.

=== Tourism ===
The sea is known for its recreational diving sites, such as Ras Mohammed, SS Thistlegorm (shipwreck), Elphinstone Reef, The Brothers, Daedalus Reef, St. John's Reef, Rocky Island, Blue Hole in Egypt and less known sites in Sudan such as Sanganeb, Abington, Angarosh and Shaab Rumi.

The Red Sea became a popular destination for diving after the expeditions of Hans Hass in the 1950s, and later by Jacques-Yves Cousteau. Popular tourist resorts include El Gouna, Hurghada, Safaga and Marsa Alam, on the west shore of the Red Sea, and Sharm-el-Sheikh, Dahab, Nuweiba, and Taba on the Egyptian side of Sinaï, as well as Aqaba in Jordan and Eilat in Israel in an area known as the Red Sea Riviera.

The popular tourist beach of Sharm el-Sheikh was closed to all swimming in December 2010 due to several serious shark attacks, including a fatality. As of December 2010, scientists are investigating the attacks and have identified, but not verified, several possible causes including overfishing which causes large sharks to hunt closer to shore, tourist boat operators who chum offshore for shark-photo opportunities, and reports of ships throwing dead livestock overboard. The sea's narrowness, significant depth, and sharp drop-offs, all combine to form a geography where large deep-water sharks can roam in hundreds of meters of water, yet be within a hundred meters of swimming areas. The Red Sea Destination is building accommodations and a range of facilities on the coastline in Saudi Arabia. The project is expected to be finished by 2030.

Tourism to the region has been threatened by occasional terrorist attacks, and by incidents related to food safety standards.

=== Security ===
The Red Sea is part of the sea roads between Europe, the Persian Gulf and East Asia, and as such has heavy shipping traffic. Government-related bodies responsible for policing the Red Sea area include the Port Said Port Authority, the Suez Canal Authority and the Red Sea Ports Authority of Egypt, the Jordan Maritime Authority, the Israel Port Authority, the Saudi Ports Authority and the Sea Ports Corporation of Sudan.

Houthi rebels in Yemen have increased attacks on shipping vessels since mid-November 2023. The blocking of Israeli-linked ships was in response to Israel's war in Gaza. In January 2024, it was reported that Red Sea shipping volumes had dropped to 30% of normal levels due to Houthi intervention. In response, the US has announced a maritime coalition to defend shipping in the Red Sea for the Operation Prosperity Guardian. In addition to the U.S.-led efforts, the European Union launched Operation Aspides in February 2024 to provide naval escorts and protect commercial shipping in the Red Sea. In January 2025, the United Nations Security Council adopted Resolution 2768, calling for an end to Houthi attacks and demanding the release of detained crew from seized vessels.

Beyond inter-state conflict, the Red Sea region is also shaped by non-traditional security threats, including piracy, illicit trafficking, and 'blue crime' – a convergence of arms smuggling, illegal fishing, and maritime terrorism within governance gaps.. In March 2024, Chairman of WeCare Foundation, Saad Kassis-Mohamed, was reported to have called on governments to reinforce maritime security protocols and protect Red Sea trade routes amid shipping disruptions and cargo diversions. Recent academic assessments highlight the role of 'shadow fleets', unregistered or covert vessels often linked to Iranian or Russian interests, which operate in the Red Sea to evade sanctions and transport illicit goods, including oil, weapons, and narcotics. While international attention has largely focused on missile and drone attacks, scholars also warn of critical infrastructure vulnerabilities, including damage to undersea cables caused by bottom trawling and sabotage.

== Bordering countries ==
A four color map of the Red Sea and its bordering countries

The Red Sea may be geographically divided into three sections: the Red Sea proper, and in the north, the Gulf of Aqaba and the Gulf of Suez. The six countries bordering the Red Sea proper are:

- Eastern shore:
  - Saudi Arabia
  - Yemen
- Western shore:
  - Egypt
  - Sudan
  - Eritrea
  - Djibouti

The Gulf of Suez is entirely bordered by Egypt. The Gulf of Aqaba borders Egypt, Israel, Jordan and Saudi Arabia.

In addition to the standard geographical definition of the six countries bordering the Red Sea cited above, areas such as Somaliland are sometimes also described as Red Sea territories. This is primarily due to their proximity to and geological similarities with the nations facing the Red Sea and/or political ties with them.

== Towns and cities ==
Towns and cities on the Red Sea coast (including the coasts of the Gulfs of Aqaba and Suez) include:

- Ain Sokhna, Egypt (العين السخنة)
- Al Hudaydah, Yemen (الحديدة)
- Al Lith, Saudi Arabia (الليِّث)
- Al Qunfudhah, Saudi Arabia (القنفذة)
- El Qoseir, Egypt (القصير)
- Al Wajh, Saudi Arabia (الوجه)
- Aqaba, Jordan (العقبة)
- Asseb, Eritrea (ዓሰብ / عصب)
- Dahab, Egypt (دهب)
- Duba, Saudi Arabia (ضباء)
- Eilat, Israel (אילת)
- El Gouna, Egypt (الجونة)
- El Tor, Egypt (الطور)
- Suez, Egypt (السويس)
- Hala'ib, Egypt and Sudan (حلايب) (disputed)
- Haql, Saudi Arabia (حقل)
- Hirgigo, Eritrea (ሕርጊጎ / حرقيقو)
- Hurghada, Egypt (الغردقة)
- Jeddah, Saudi Arabia (جدة)
- Jazan, Saudi Arabia (جازان)
- Makadi Bay, Egypt (خليج مكادي)
- Marsa Alam, Egypt (مرسى علم)
- Massawa, Eritrea (ምጽዋዕ / مصوع)
- Mokha, Yemen (المُخا)
- Moulhoule, Djibouti (مول هولة)
- Nuweiba, Egypt (نويبع)
- Port Sudan, Sudan (بورت سودان)
- Rabigh, Saudi Arabia (رابغ)
- Ras Sedr, Egypt (راس سدر)
- Safaga, Egypt (سفاجا)
- Sahl Hasheesh, Egypt (سهل حشيش)
- Sharm El Sheikh, Egypt (شرم الشيخ)
- Soma Bay, Egypt (سوما باي)
- Suakin, Sudan (سواكن)
- Taba, Egypt (طابا)
- Thuwal, Saudi Arabia (ثول)
- Yanbu, Saudi Arabia (ينبع)

== See also ==
- MS al-Salam Boccaccio 98 ferry disaster
- Crossing the Red Sea, a Biblical tale from the Book of Exodus
- List of islands in the Red Sea
- Red Sea Dam
- List of geographical features of the Red Sea
- Red Sea species hazardous to humans
- The Red Sea Project
