= Ashland =

Ashland may refer to:

== Places ==
=== Canada ===
- Ashland, New Brunswick

=== United Kingdom ===
- Simpson and Ashland, Milton Keynes, Buckinghamshire

=== United States ===
==== Historic sites ====
- Ashland (Henry Clay estate), a historic site in Lexington, Kentucky, and the source of the name of several other Ashlands
- Ashland Home, listed on the National Register of Historic Places (NRHP) in Maryland
- Ashland Plantation in Darrow, Louisiana
- Ashland (Ashland, North Carolina), listed on the NRHP in North Carolina
- Ashland (Henderson, North Carolina), listed on the NRHP in North Carolina

==== Communities ====
- Ashland, Alabama
- Ashland, California
- Ashland, Georgia
- Ashland, Illinois
- Ashland, Indiana
- Ashland, Kansas
- Ashland, Kentucky
- Clay, Kentucky, founded as Ashland
- Ashland, Natchitoches Parish, Louisiana
- Ashland, Maine, a New England town
  - Ashland (CDP), Maine, the main village in the town
- Ashland, Massachusetts
- Ashland, Michigan
- Ashland, Mississippi
- Ashland, Missouri
- Ashland, Montana
- Ashland, Nebraska
- Ashland, New Hampshire, a New England town
  - Ashland (CDP), New Hampshire, the main village in the town
- Ashland, New Jersey
- Ashland, Chemung County, New York
- Ashland, Greene County, New York
- Ashland, Ohio
- Ashland, Oklahoma
- Ashland, Oregon
- Ashland, Pennsylvania
- Ashland, Tennessee
- Ashland, Virginia
- Ashland, West Virginia
- Ashland, Wisconsin, a city
- Ashland (town), Wisconsin, a town

==== Other places with Ashland in its name ====
- Ashland City, Tennessee
- Ashland County, Ohio
- Ashland County, Wisconsin
- Ashland Heights, South Dakota
- Ashland Junction, Wisconsin, an unincorporated community
- Ashland Township, Morgan County, Indiana
- Ashland Township, Michigan
- Ashland Township, Dodge County, Minnesota
- Ashland Township, Pennsylvania

== Ships ==
- USS Ashland (LSD-1), launched 1942
- USS Ashland (LSD-48), launched 1989
- City of Ashland (shipwreck), launched 1883, shipwrecked 1887

== Train stations ==
- Ashland station (CTA Green and Pink Lines), Chicago
- Ashland station (CTA Orange Line), Chicago
- Ashland/63rd station, Chicago
- Ashland/Calumet Park station, Calumet Park, Illinois
- Ashland station (MBTA), Ashland, Massachusetts
- Ashland station (PATCO), Voorhees, New Jersey
- Ashland station (Virginia), an Amtrak station in Virginia
- Ashland Transportation Center, an intermodal transit station in Kentucky
- Ashland station (Soo Line), a former station in Wisconsin
- Ashland Union Station, a former station in Wisconsin

== Other uses ==
- Ashland Airport (disambiguation), several instances
- Ashland Brewing Company, a historic Wisconsin brewery
- Ashland Bridge (disambiguation), several instances
- Ashland Daily Tidings, a newspaper
- Ashland Daily Press, a newspaper
- Ashland High School (disambiguation), several instances
- Ashland Inc., formerly known as Ashland Oil (named for Ashland, Kentucky)
- Marathon Ashland Petroleum, LLC, former name of Marathon Petroleum
- Ashland Railway
- Ashland University in Ashland, Ohio
- Clay-Ashland, Liberia, a township named after Henry Clay and his estate.
- Waking Ashland, a piano rock band whose name was inspired by Ashland, Oregon

== See Also ==
ashfield (disambiguation)
