= AHS =

AHS may refer to:

== Schools ==
- Adelaide High School, Adelaide, Australia
- Aitkin High School, Minnesota, US
- Agoura High School, Agoura Hills, US
- Albemarle High School (Virginia), US
- Alice High School, Texas, US
- Allen High School (disambiguation), various schools
- Alpharetta High School, Georgia, US
- Alternative High School (Calgary), Alberta, Canada
- Ames High School, Iowa, US
- Amsterdam High School, New York, US
- Andrean High School, Indiana, US
- Anglican High School (disambiguation), various schools
- Annandale High School, Virginia, US
- Ashland High School (disambiguation), various schools
- Austin High School (disambiguation), various schools
- Aylesbury High School, Buckinghamshire, UK
- Ancaster High School, Ontario, Canada
- Amesbury High School, Massachusetts, US
- Ajax High School, Ajax, Ontario, Canada
- Attleboro High School, Attleboro, Massachusetts, United States
- Auburn High School (Alabama),, US

== Societies ==
- American Headache Society, of professional headache specialists
- American Helicopter Society International
- American Horticultural Society
- Arizona Historical Society, US
- Abertay Historical Society, Scotland
- National Federation of Atheist, Humanist and Secular Student Societies, UK

== Health-related ==
- Academy of Health Sciences, US Army
- Adventist Health Studies, of Seventh-day Adventists
- Alameda Health System, of Alameda County, California
- Alberta Health Services, a provincial health authority in Alberta, Canada
- Atlantic Health System, a New Jersey health care network

== Other uses ==
- African horse sickness, affecting equines
- AH-Software, a Japanese digital audio workstation brand
- Alien hand syndrome, a neurological disorder affecting the hands
- American Horror Story, an American television series
  - American Horror Stories, an spin-off of the American television series
- American Housing Survey, a statistical survey
- Ashurst (Kent) railway station, England (National Rail code)
- Australian Hospital Ship, prefix
- Automated highway system or Smart Road, for driverless cars

== See also ==
- AH (disambiguation)
- HS (disambiguation)
