= Austin =

Austin refers to:

== Arts and entertainment ==
- Austin (album), by Post Malone, 2023
- "Austin" (Blake Shelton song), 2001
- "Austin" (Dasha song), 2023
- Austin (TV series), a 2024 Australian-British comedy series

== Businesses and organisations ==
=== Businesses ===
- American Austin Car Company, short-lived American automobile maker
- Austin Automobile Company, short-lived American automobile company
- Austin Motor Company, British car manufacturer
  - Austin magazine, produced for the Austin Motor Company by in-house Nuffield Press
- Austin Airways, a former Canadian passenger airline and freight carrier
- Austin cookies and crackers, a Kellanova brand

=== Education ===
- Austin College, in Sherman, Texas, U.S.
- Austin High School (disambiguation), several schools
- University of Austin, in Austin, Texas, U.S.
- University of Texas at Austin, in Austin, Texas, U.S.

== Military ==
- USS Austin, the name of three ships
- Austin-class amphibious transport dock, a former US Navy ship class
- Austin armoured car, a British First World War armoured car

== People ==
- Austin (given name), including a list of people with the name
- Austin (surname), including a list of people with the name
- Augustine of Hippo (354–430), also known as St. Austin, Christian theologian and saint

== Places ==
=== Canada ===
- Austin, Manitoba, an unincorporated community
- Austin, Ontario, a neighbourhood
- Austin, Quebec, a municipality
- Austin Island, Nunavut

=== United States ===
- Austin, Arkansas, a city
- Austin, Colorado, an unincorporated community
- Austin, Chicago, Illinois, a community area
- Austin, Indiana, a city
- Austin, Kentucky
- Austin, Minnesota, a city
- Austin, Missouri, an unincorporated community
- Austin, Mississippi, an unincorporated community and census-designated place
- Austin, Nevada, an unincorporated town and census-designated place
- Austin, Ohio, an unincorporated community
- Austin, Oregon, an unincorporated community considered a ghost town
- Austin, Pennsylvania, a borough
- Austin, Texas, the capital city of Texas
- Austin County, Texas
- Austin Lake, Michigan
- Lake Austin, a reservoir in Austin, Texas
- Austin Township (disambiguation)

=== Elsewhere ===
- Austin, Western Australia, Australia, a ghost town
- Mount Austin (Antarctica), Palmer Land
- Austin Peak, part of the Mirabito Range in Victoria Land, Antarctica
- Mount Austin, Hong Kong, a hill also known as Victoria Peak

== Sports ==
- Austin FC, an American soccer club
  - Austin FC II, reserve team for Austin FC
- Austin Spurs, an American basketball team
- Austin Bruins, an American ice hockey team

== Other uses ==
- Austin (building), a building designed by artist Ellsworth Kelly in Austin, Texas
- Austin, an adjective in England for Augustinian friars

== See also ==
- Austin station (disambiguation)
- Austins (disambiguation)
- Austen (disambiguation)
- Austin Airport (disambiguation)
- Austin Hospital, Melbourne, Victoria, Australia
- Austin Road, Hong Kong
