= Austin Township, Michigan =

Austin Township is the name of some places in the U.S. state of Michigan:

- Austin Township, Mecosta County, Michigan
- Austin Township, Sanilac County, Michigan

== See also ==
- Port Austin Township, Michigan in Huron County
- Austin, Michigan (disambiguation)
- Austin Township (disambiguation)
