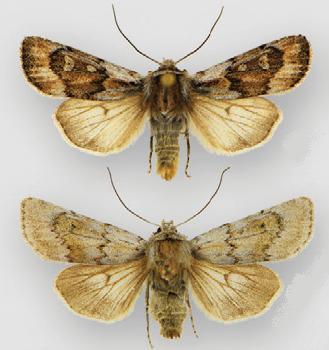
- male (top) female (bottom)

Conservation status
- Imperiled (NatureServe)

Scientific classification
- Kingdom: Animalia
- Phylum: Arthropoda
- Clade: Pancrustacea
- Class: Insecta
- Order: Lepidoptera
- Superfamily: Noctuoidea
- Family: Noctuidae
- Genus: Euxoa
- Species: E. muldersi

Binomial name
- Euxoa muldersi Lafontaine & Hensel, 2010

= Euxoa muldersi =

Species of moth

Euxoa muldersi, the Mulder's dart moth, is a moth of the family Noctuidae. It is known only from north central Canada with most known specimens from the vicinity of Arviat, Nunavut. It is restricted to open dunes where it flies close to the sand. The forewing length is 13–15 mm (0.51–0.59 in).

== Taxonomy ==
Euxoa muldersi was formally described in 2010 based on a male specimen collected from Austin Island in Nunavut, Canada, in 1996. The species is named after Robert Mulders, the biologist who first collected a specimen of the species. It is placed within the subgenus Pleonectopoda and seems to be most closely related to E. hyperborea.

== Description ==
The forewing length is 13–15 mm (0.51–0.59 in).

Compared to Euxoa steideli, it has a smaller size, a more blackish forewing, reduced eyes, a less expressed terminal band on the hind-wing, darker basal hind-wings, and differently shaped valva in males.

== Distribution and conservation ==
Euxoa muldersi is known only from Nunavut and the Northwest Territories in north-central Canada. In Nunavut, it is known from near the hamlet of Arviat, while it has been collected from near Ford Lake in the Northwest Territories. It is only found on open dunes, where it flies near the sand. Vocalizing E. muldersi females have been seen attracting males of E. churchillensis, although no interspecific mating has been seen.

The species has a NatureServe conservation status of G2, Imperiled.
