= List of shipwrecks in August 1887 =

The list of shipwrecks in August 1887 includes ships sunk, foundered, grounded, or otherwise lost during August 1887.

== 2 August ==
List of shipwrecks: 2 August 1887
Ship	State	Description
Rhuddlan Castle	United Kingdom	The ship was sighted in the Atlantic Ocean whilst on a voyage from Fleetwood, Lancashire to Valparaíso, Chile. No further trace, reported missing.

== 7 August ==
List of shipwrecks: 7 August 1887
Ship	State	Description
Treherbert	United Kingdom	The steamship ran aground and sank at Cape Finisterre, Spain. Her crew survived. She was on a voyage from Madeira to Bilbao, Spain.
Unnamed	Flag unknown	The barque was run into by the steamship Denmark (United Kingdom) and sank in the Atlantic Ocean 400 nautical miles (740 km; 460 mi) off the American coast.

== 8 August ==
List of shipwrecks: 8 August 1887
Ship	State	Description
City of Ashland	United States	The paddle steamer caught fire and sank in Chequamegon Bay, Lake Superior 1 nautical mile (1.9 km) south of the Chequamegon Point Lighthouse with the loss of one life.

== 9 August ==
List of shipwrecks: 9 August 1887
Ship	State	Description
Mermaid	United Kingdom	The schooner collided with the barque Minerva (Germany) and sank in the Thames Estuary 1 nautical mile (1.9 km) east north east of the Nore. Her crew were rescued by the smack Star of Whitstable (United Kingdom).

== 10 August ==
List of shipwrecks: 10 August 1887
Ship	State	Description
City of Montreal	United Kingdom	City of Montreal The passenger ship caught fire and sank in the Atlantic Ocean, 400 nautical miles (740 km) off the coast of Newfoundland (43°38′N 53°54′W). All 245 passengers and crew were rescued by York City (United Kingdom). City of Montreal was on a voyage from New York, United States to Liverpool, Lancashire.
Wellesley	United Kingdom	The training ship was run into by the steamship Aviemore (United Kingdom) at Purfleet, Essex and was severely damaged at the stern.

== 12 August ==
List of shipwrecks: 12 August 1887
Ship	State	Description
Careline Corson	United States	The schooner was wrecked at Lanesville, Massachusetts.

== 13 August ==
List of shipwrecks: 13 August 1887
Ship	State	Description
Andrea Vagliano, and Norbiton	Greece; United Kingdom	The steamship Norbiton collided with the steamship Andrea Vagliano and sank in the English Channel off Start Point, Devon with the loss of seven of the twenty people on board. Survivors were rescued by Andrea Vagliano. Norbiton was on a voyage from Cardiff, Glamorgan to Rouen, Seine-Inférieure, France. Andrea Vagliano was severely damaged. She was towed in to Plymouth, Devon waterlogged at the bow by the tug Vixen (United Kingdom).

== 17 August ==
List of shipwrecks: 17 August 1887
Ship	State	Description
Kheidoe Queen	United Kingdom	The Cardiff barquentine stranded at Gorsons. All of the crew were saved.
Marchsea	United Kingdom	The steam yacht was driven ashore at Brighton, Sussex. She was refloated with assistance from the steamship Brighton (United Kingdom).

== 18 August ==
List of shipwrecks: 18 August 1887
Ship	State	Description
Bay of Naples	United Kingdom	The ship capsized at Liverpool, Lancashire.
Terzo	United Kingdom	The ship ran aground at Belfast, County Antrim. She was on a voyage from Quebec City, Canada to Belfast.

== 19 August ==
List of shipwrecks: 19 August 1887
Ship	State	Description
Acklington	United Kingdom	The steamship struck the Runnel Stone and sank. Her crew survived. She was on a voyage from Newport, Monmouthshire to Portland, Dorset.
Joseph	United Kingdom	The Thames barge collided with a dredger and sank in the River Thames at Barking, Essex. Her crew were rescued.

== 20 August ==
List of shipwrecks: 20 August 1887
Ship	State	Description
Lydia J. Crowell	United Kingdom	The fishing schooner was believed to have foundered in a hurricane in the Grand Banks of Newfoundland on this date with the loss of all fifteen crew.

== 21 August ==
List of shipwrecks: 21 August 1887
Ship	State	Description
Arato	United Kingdom	The steamship ran aground on Perkin's Reef, in the Red Sea. She was on a voyage from Calcutta, India to Hull, Yorkshire. Whilst aground, she was plundered by the local inhabitants. She was later refloated and taken in to Perim, Aden Governorate.

== 22 August ==
List of shipwrecks: 22 August 1887
Ship	State	Description
Belle	United Kingdom	The ship departed from Sydney, Nova Scotia, Canada for Saint John's, Newfoundland Colony. No further trace, reported missing.

== 23 August ==
List of shipwrecks: 23 August 1887
Ship	State	Description
Eureka	United Kingdom	The steamship struck the pier at Workington, Cumberland and broke in two. She was on a voyage from Bilbao, Spain to Workington. She was refloated in early September.
Oasis	United States	The barque was abandoned in the Atlantic Ocean. Her crew were rescued by the steamship Carl Konow (Norway). Oasis was on a voyage from Philadelphia, Pennsylvania to Hiogo, Japan.
Sarah Ann	United Kingdom	The barge was run into by the steamship Clifton Grove (United Kingdom) and sank in the River Avon with the loss of a crew member.
Snipe	United Kingdom	The steamship collided with Racine (United Kingdom) and sank in the River Usk.

== 24 August ==
List of shipwrecks: 24 August 1887
Ship	State	Description
Alabama	United Kingdom	The barque was destroyed by fire in the South Atlantic. Her crew were rescued by the barque Orvar Odd (Norway). Alabama was on a voyage from Liverpool, Lancashire to Rio de Janeiro, Brazil.
Enigheden	Norway	The brig was driven ashore and wrecked in Freshwick Bay. Her crew were rescued. She was on a voyage from Drammen to Garlieston, Wigtownshire, United Kingdom.

== 25 August ==
List of shipwrecks: 25 August 1887
Ship	State	Description
Bermuda	Flag unknown	The steamship became flooded in a hurricane. She was on a voyage from the West Indies to New York, United States.
Prince de Conde	France	The barque foundered in the Grand Banks of Newfoundland. Her crew were rescued by the steamship Prussian (United Kingdom). Prince de Conde was on a voyage from Fécamp, Seine-Inférieure to the Newfoundland Colony.

== 26 August ==
List of shipwrecks: 26 August 1887
Ship	State	Description
Electa	United Kingdom	The ship departed from Queenstown, County Cork for Martinique. No further trace, reported overdue.
Lilian	Flag unknown	The steamship was wrecked in a hurricane. Her seventeen crew were rescued by the steam yacht Mohican (United States). Lilian was on a voyage from Rotterdam, South Holland, Netherlands to New York, United States.
Monarch	United Kingdom	The yacht sank off Ilfracombe, Devon with the loss of eleven of the 25 or 26 people on board. One of the survivors was rescued by the yacht Lorna Doone (United Kingdom).

== 27 August ==
List of shipwrecks: 27 August 1887
Ship	State	Description
King George	United Kingdom	The fishing trawler struck the Black Rocks and sank in West Bay, Dorset.

== 29 August ==
List of shipwrecks: 29 August 1887
Ship	State	Description
Sierra Lucinda	United Kingdom	The ship ran aground at Cardiff, Glamorgan. She was refloated the next day and taken in to Penarth, Glamorgan.

== 30 August ==
List of shipwrecks: 30 August 1887
Ship	State	Description
Clyde	United Kingdom	The ship, which had caught fire on 28 August, was abandoned in the Atlantic Ocean (45°52′N 40°00′W). Her crew were rescued by Marian King (Flag unknown). Clyde was on a voyage from Leith, Lothian to Quebec City, Canada.
Nina	United Kingdom	The smack ran aground on the Pole Sands, in the River Exe. She was on a voyage from Topsham to Berry Head, Devon.
Rapid	United Kingdom	The ship was driven ashore at Port Talbot, Glamorgan. She was on a voyage from Bilbao, Spain to Port Talbot. She was refloated on 4 September, but then ran aground again. She was refloated on 5 September and taken in to Port Talbot.
Sylphide	United Kingdom	The ketch was driven ashore at Holland-on-Sea, Essex. She was refloated with assistance and taken in to Harwich, Essex in a leaky condition.

== 31 August ==
List of shipwrecks: 31 August 1887
Ship	State	Description
Chevy Chase	United Kingdom	The ship departed from South Shields, County Durham for Valparaíso, Chile. No further trace, reported missing.
Star	United Kingdom	The bawley was run down and sunk in the River Thames at Gravesend, Kent by the steamship Cyprus (United Kingdom). Two of her crew were drowned.

== Unknown date ==
List of shipwrecks: Unknown date in August 1887
Ship	State	Description
Alice Ray	United States	The ship was abandoned in the Atlantic Ocean before 25 July. She was on a voyage from New York to Quebec City, Canada.
Argosy	Flag unknown	The steamship ran aground at New York. She was refloated.
Ashurst	United Kingdom	The steamship struck rocks at Ballachulish, Inverness-shire. She put in to Oban, Argyllshire, where she ran aground.
Atlas	Norway	The steamship was driven ashore at "Alexandroff", Sakhalin, Russia.
Batavier	United Kingdom	The barque was driven ashore. She was on a voyage from Shanghai to Tientsin, China.
Ben Nevis	Flag unknown	The hulk ran aground at Obock, French Somaliland and broke up.
Benton	United Kingdom	The steamship was driven ashore at Flekkefjord, Norway.
British India	United Kingdom	The barque was driven ashore at "Dwarsinweg", Zeeland, Netherlands. She was on a voyage from Rangoon, Burma to Rotterdam, South Holland, Netherlands. She was refloated with the assistance of a number of tugs.
Catalina	Spain	The brig was abandoned in the Atlantic Ocean. Her crew were rescued. She was on a voyage from Cienfuegos, Cuba to Vigo.
Christine	United Kingdom	The ship was driven ashore and wrecked at Halmstad, Sweden. She was on a voyage from Kronstadt, Russia to Grangemouth, Stirlingshire.
Cotherstone	United Kingdom	The ship was driven ashore at Dunnet Head, Caithness. She was on a voyage from Dublin to Sunderland, County Durham.
Daphne	Austria-Hungary	The steamship ran aground in the Danube 39 nautical miles (72 km) from its mouth.
East Lomond	Italy	The barque caught fire in the Atlantic Ocean. She was abandoned 40 nautical miles (74 km) north of Las Palmas, Canary Islands. Her crew were rescued by the steamship Tainui (United Kingdom). East Lomond was on a voyage from Grangemouth, Stirlingshire, United Kingdom to Buenos Aires, Argentina.
Elise	United Kingdom	The schooner was driven ashore at Cape Virgenes, Argentina.
Emma May	Flag unknown	The ship was wrecked on the Fish Clay Banks. She was on a voyage from Guantanamo, Cuba to Halifax, Nova Scotia, Canada.
Falcon	United Kingdom	The steamship was driven ashore on Gotland, Sweden. She was later refloated and taken in to Oskarshamn, Sweden.
Glanwern	United Kingdom	The steamship struck a rock at Cabezos, Spain. She put in to Gibraltar waterlogged at the bow.
Guldax	Norway	The barque was driven ashore and wrecked at "Jankalilla", Queensland. She was a total loss.
Highflyer	Germany	The barque was abandoned in the Atlantic Ocean. Her crew were rescued by the steamship Richmond Hill (United Kingdom). Highflyer was on a voyage from New York to Danzig. She was subsequently towed in to Halifax by Richmond Hill.
Idun	Norway	The full-rigged ship caught fire at Montevideo, Uruguay.
Ljubirod	Flag unknown	The ship was driven ashore at Brisbane, Queensland.
Louisa	Norway	The steamship ran aground on the Stone Reef, in the Baltic Sea.
Mary E. Douglas	United States	The ship was abandoned in the Atlantic Ocean. She was on a voyage from New York to Jérémie, Haiti.
Maurice	France	The schooner ran aground and was wrecked on the Newcombe Sands in the North Sea off the coast of Suffolk, United Kingdom. Her crew survived. She was on a voyage from Middlesbrough, Yorkshire, United Kingdom to Redon, Ille-et-Vilaine.
RMS Medway	United Kingdom	The steamship ran aground at Jacmel, Haiti. She was refloated and resumed her voyage.
Minerva	Norway	The steamship was driven ashore and wrecked at Cape Spartivento, Sardinia, Italy.
Nordcap	United Kingdom	The brigantine was driven ashore at Pentewan, Cornwall. She was on a voyage from Newport, Monmouthshire to Pentewan.
Phœnix	Denmark	The brigantine ran aground in the Baltic Sea. She was on a voyage from Kemi, Grand Duchy of Finland to Grangemouth. She was refloated and put in to Copenhagen, where she arrived on 25 August in a leaky condition.
Port Gordon	United Kingdom	The barque collided with the transport ship Caravane (France) at Havre de Grâce, Seine-Inférieure, France and was severely damaged.
Saga	United Kingdom	The steamship was driven ashore at Huelva, Spain. She was later refloated.
Senior	Netherlands	The steamship ran aground off Vlieland, Friesland. She was on a voyage from Riga, Russia to Harlingen, Friesland.
Tientsin	China	The steamship was driven ashore and wrecked, possibly at Swatow.
Vanadis	Sweden	The steamship was driven ashore at "Enetri", Öland. She was on a voyage from an Englisn port to Stockholm.
Viking	Norway	The brig was driven ashore at "Alacranes". She was on a voyage from "Tiacolapan" to Queenstown, County Cork, United Kingdom. She was a total loss.
Voltaic	United Kingdom	The ship ran aground in the River Foyle.
Zoe	United Kingdom	The steamship was wrecked on the coast of Brazil with the loss of two of her crew. She was on a voyage from Newport, Monmouthshire to Buenos Aires.
Unnamed	Flag unknown	The steamship ran aground at Trelleborg, Sweden.
Eight unnamed vessels	United Kingdom	The sand barges sank at Barry, Glamorgan.
