= Battle of Ad-Dakim =

- Part of Campaign in South Arabia
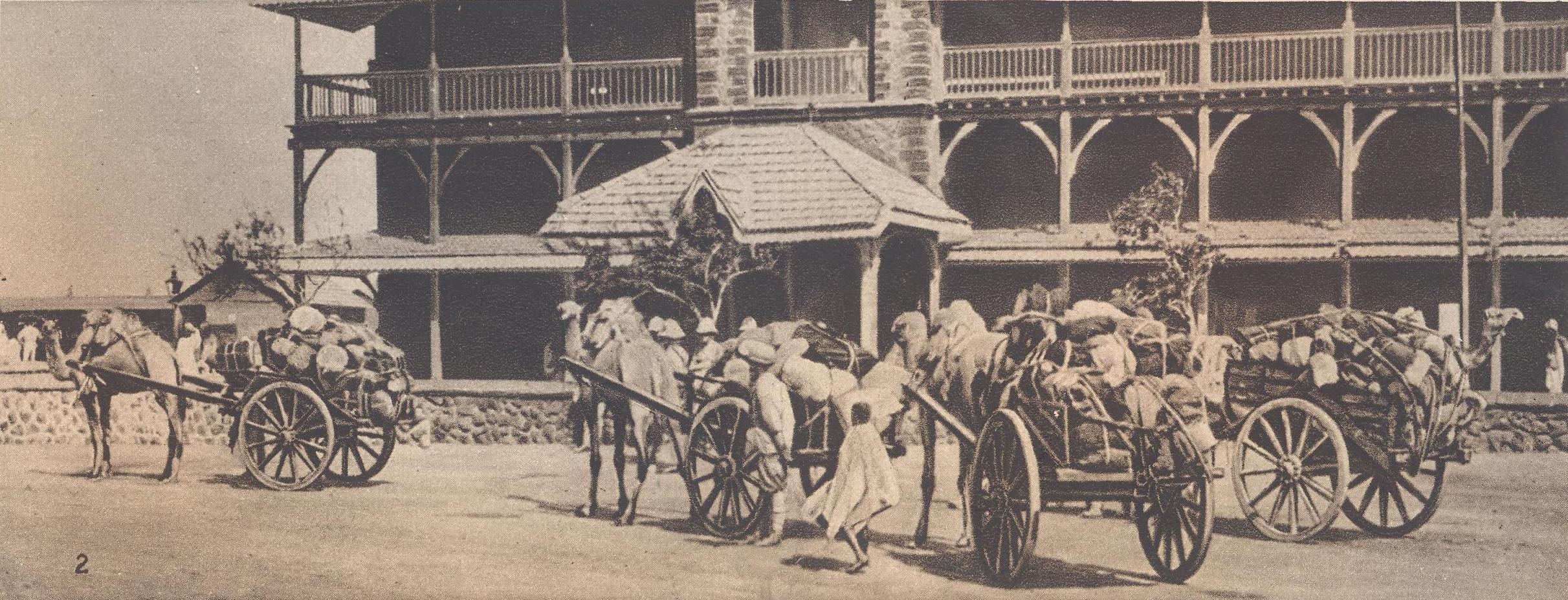
- British military transport in Aden
Date	June, 1915 – July 5, 1915
Location	Ad-Dakim, Lahej Sultanate, Aden Protectorate
Result	Ottoman victory
Territorial changes	Ottoman occupation of Lahij

Belligerents
Ottoman Empire: Haushabi Sultanate	British Empire; India; Sultanate of Lahij

Commanders and leaders
(Ottoman Empire) Ahmed Tevfik Pasha; (Ottoman Empire) Ali Sait Pasha; (Ottoman Empire) Hüseyin Ragıp Bey; (Ottoman Empire) Imam Yahya	Ali bin Ahmed Al-Abdali D. G. L. Shaw

The Battle of Ad-Dakim (Arabic: معركة الدكيم) took place on July 3, 1915, in the Sultanate of Lahej, in which the Yemeni-Ottoman forces defeated the forces of the Sultan of the Sultanate of Lahej, Ali bin Ahmed, who were loyal to the British. They entered Lahej, and its sultan, Ali bin Ahmed Al-Abdali, withdrew from it to Aden, where he was assassinated by firing squad.

== The siege ==
At the beginning of June 1915, the garrison in Aden weakened, as a result of sending some British forces to the islands of Kamaran and Farasan and other islands of the Red Sea. The Ottomans took advantage of this and sent from northern Yemen a force of 2,000 Turkish soldiers and 4,000 Yemeni soldiers, and a joint division of 3,000 Arab soldiers from Taiz, Yafi' and Al-Hawashib, and they sent down ten cannons with them. It crossed the borders of the remote areas of Aden and advanced towards Lahej. The Sultan of Lahej asked the British command in Aden for help, saying that the Ottomans had come to Mawiyah to attack them. From the available soldiers, a small unit was formed in the city called the “Aden Mobile Column” towards Lahej. Meanwhile, the Turks occupied Sheikh Saeed again.

On June 13, the Ottomans bombed and attacked Perim the next day. But the Indian force stationed on the island withstood the attack, and they suffered some losses. After the success at Perim, Brigadier General Shaw deemed it necessary to send the camel contingent in Aden to Lahej to assist Sultan Abdali, whose force had been almost eliminated by the Turks. Those forces arrived at Nubia Dakim, and discovered a strong Ottoman force outside Lahej, supported by a large number of Arab tribesmen. They found the Sultan's forces in Lahej, so they withdrew to Lahej. On July 3, the Aden mobile column, consisting of two hundred and fifty rifles and two mortars, departed to support that division. The climatic conditions were difficult: the heat was intense, there was a significant shortage of water, and progress was difficult on the sand. The remainder of the column was so delayed by transportation difficulties and water shortages that it never reached Lahej at all.

In the Sultan's capital, the British found themselves facing four Ottoman battalions and twenty artillery pieces provided from Mawiya and Al-Hujariya. In addition, Arab tribesmen rallied in their thousands to help the Ottomans. The British were supported by a few hundred men of the Sultan of Lahej's original army. The followers of the Arab camp of the Aden detachment deserted them at the most critical time, taking all their camels with them. The fighting began on the evening of Sunday, July 4. The Ottoman forces made several attacks against the British force, but all of them were repelled. Although Brigadier Shaw praised the efforts of the Royal Artillery after the battle, the superior Ottoman artillery set various parts of Lahej on fire, and the British were in danger of being surrounded and cut off by the Arab tribesmen. When the main column had not yet reached Aden, the British withdrew on July 5, with three officers wounded. The main loss was not so much in men as in prestige. The Ottomans had occupied Lahej, but Sultan Abdali was mistakenly wounded by British forces, and was transferred to Aden, where he died during the attack. Surgery was performed on him.

== Sources ==
- Encyclopedia of the fighter, memory of time.
