= Austins =

Austins may refer to:

- Austins, a department store in Newton Abbot, Devon, England
- Austins, a former department store in Derry, Northern Ireland
- Austins Bridge, an American Christian country band
  - Austins Bridge (album), 2007
- Austins Colony
- Austins Ferry, Tasmania, Australia
- Austins Mill, Tennessee, United States

== See also ==
- Austin (disambiguation)
