= HBD =

HBD may refer to:

== Arts and entertainment ==
- HBD, a 2018 episode of American TV and web series High Maintenance
- "HBD", a 2018 single by Bassagong
- "HBD (Birthday Mo)", a 2019 song by Skusta Clee
- "HBD", a song by Seventeen from the 2025 album Happy Burstday

== Businesses and organizations ==
- HBD Venture Capital ("Here be Dragons"), a venture capital provider founded by Mark Shuttleworth
- Health Biotechnology Division of National Institute for Biotechnology and Genetic Engineering, Pakistan
- Hybrid, or HBD, a warez group

== Science and technology ==
- Has been drinking, a medical abbreviation
- Helicase binding domain, of the DNA primase DnaG
- Hemoglobin D (HbD), a variant of hemoglobin
- HBD (gene), the gene encoding Hemoglobin subunit delta
- Hoja blanca disease, caused by rice hoja blanca tenuivirus
- Hot bearing detector, a type of defect detector on railroads
- Humboldtine (Hbd), a mineral
- Torrenticolidae, CoL taxon identifier HBD

== Transport ==
- Habaraduwa railway station, Sri Lanka, station code HBD
- Habi Airport, Papua New Guinea, IATA airport code HBD
- Hebden Bridge railway station, England, station code HBD
- Hebi East railway station, China, station code HBD
- Hoshangabad railway station, Madhya Pradesh, India, station code HBD

== Other uses ==
- Higher Banking Diploma program, of Emirates Institute for Banking and Financial Studies

== See also ==
- Happy Birthday (disambiguation)
