= Austinville =

Austinville may be any of the following places:

- Austinville, Virginia, a town in the United States
- Austinville, Iowa, a town in the United States
- Proctor, West Virginia, a town in the United States also known as Austinville
- Austinville, Queensland, a suburb of the Gold Coast in Queensland, Australia.

== See also ==
- Austin (disambiguation)
- Austinburg (disambiguation)
- Austintown
