= Austinburg =

Austinburg may refer to:

- Austinburg, Ohio, a census-designated place in Austinburg Township, Ashtabula County, Ohio, United States
- Austinburg, Pennsylvania, a village in Brookfield Township, Tioga County, Pennsylvania, United States
- Austinburg Township, Ashtabula County, Ohio, United States

== See also ==
- Austin (disambiguation)
- Austinville (disambiguation)
- Austintown
