= Austin station =

Austin station may refer to:

- Austin station (Texas), an Amtrak station in Austin, Texas
- Austin station (CTA Blue Line) in Chicago
- Austin station (CTA Green Line), also in Chicago
- Austin station (MTR), in Hong Kong

== See also ==
- Austin (disambiguation)
