= HS =

HS or Hs can stand for:

== Businesses and brands ==
- HS Produkt, a Croatian firearms manufacturer
- Helsingin Sanomat, a newspaper in Finland
- Hawker Siddeley, aircraft manufacturing group
- Henschel & Son, in aircraft prefixes; e.g., Hs 117
- Head & Shoulders or H&S, a shampoo brand
- Harris Scarfe and HS Home, a chain of Australian department stores

== Science and technology ==
=== Chemistry ===
- Hassium, symbol Hs, a chemical element
- Humic substance
- Bisulfide, HS^{−}, a chemical compound derived from H_{2}S
- Mercapto radical, HS^{•}, a radical molecule
- Hun stuff (a World War I name for mustard gas)

=== Medicine ===
- hs, medical abbreviation for "hours of sleep"
- h.s., medical abbreviation for the Latin phrase hora somni ("at bedtime")
- Hereditary spherocytosis, a genetic disorder marked by hemolytic anemia
- Hidradenitis suppurativa, a skin condition affecting apocrine sweat glands and hair follicles

=== Other uses in science and technology ===
- '.hs', the Haskell programming language's typical filename extension
- Heat sink
- Higman–Sims group, in mathematics
- $\left\|\cdot\right\|_{\text{HS}}$, the Hilbert–Schmidt norm
- Hilbert series of a graded algebra
- Horizon scanning, a method from futures studies
- Hypothetical syllogism, a proof rule in classical logic

== Vehicles ==
- Curtiss HS, an American patrol flying boat
- Lexus HS, a Japanese compact hybrid sedan
- MG HS, a Chinese-British compact SUV
- YTHS HS, a Chinese unmanned aerial vehicle series

== Other uses ==
- Harlem Spartans, a British hip hop collective
- Harmonized System, the Harmonized Commodity Description and Coding System of tariff nomenclature
- High school (secondary education)
- Holy Spirit
- HS postcode area, covering the Outer Hebrides, Scotland
- Sestertius, an ancient Roman coin
- Solar Hijri calendar (= Hijri Shamsi)
- SS-Heimatschutz Slowakei (HS), a German paramilitary group in Slovakia during World War II
- Thailand (aircraft registration prefix HS)
