= List of medical abbreviations: H =

Sortable table
Abbreviation	Meaning
h	hr / hours
H	histamine or its receptors (if with subscripts) hemagglutinin
H_{x}	history
HA ; H/A	hypertonia arterialis headache calcium hydroxyapatite
HAA	hepatitis-associated antigen or #History As Above
HAART	highly active antiretroviral therapy
HACA	human anti-chimeric antibody
HACE	High-altitude cerebral edema
HACEK	acronym for a group of bacteria that are a frequent cause of endocarditis in children
HAD	HIV-associated dementia
HADS	Hospital Anxiety and Depression Scale
HAE	hereditary angioedema
H/A	headache
HAI	healthcare-associated infection or hospital-acquired infection
HALE	health-adjusted life expectancy
HAPE	high-altitude pulmonary edema
HAV	hepatitis A virus
Hb	hemoglobin
HB	heart block
Hb%	hemoglobin concentration in gram per deciliter
HbA	hemoglobin A (commonest type of hemoglobin)
HbA1c	glycated hemoglobin (used as a measure of diabetes control)
HBD	has been drinking
HbF	fetal hemoglobin
HBO	hyperbaric oxygen
HBP	high blood pressure, that is, hypertension
Hb_{s}Ag	Hepatitis B surface antigen
HBV	hepatitis B virus
HC	head circumference hemorrhagic colitis homocysteine
HCA	Healthcare Associated, as in HCA-CDI
HCAP	health care-associated (or acquired) pneumonia
HCC	hepatocellular carcinoma
HCF	Healthcare Facility
HCFA	Healthcare Facility Associated, as in HCFA-CDI
hCG	human chorionic gonadotropin
HCL	hairy cell leukemia
HCM	hypertrophic cardiomyopathy healthcare maintenance
HCO3	bicarbonate
Hct	hematocrit
HCT	hematocrit hematopoietic cell transplantation
HCRP	Hospital Cornea Retrieval Programme
HCTZ	hydrochlorothiazide
HCV	hepatitis C virus
HD	Hodgkin disease Hemodialysis; Huntington's disease
HDL	high-density lipoprotein
HDL-C	high-density lipoprotein-cholesterol
HDN	hemolytic disease of the newborn
HDS	hemodynamically stable (i.e., not bleeding)
HDU	high dependency unit
HDV	hepatitis D virus
HDW	Hemoglobin Distribution Width
H&E	hematoxylin and eosin, a standard tissue stain
HE	hepatic encephalopathy
HEC	High emetogenic chemotherapy
HEENT	head, eyes, ears, nose, throat
HELP; HELLP	HELLP syndrome (Hemolysis, elevated liver enzymes, low platelets in pregnancy)
HEMA	hydroxy ethyl methacrylate, a material in soft contact lenses
Hema	hematest – e.g. hema (-) – fecal occult blood
HES	hydroxyethyl starch
HETE	hydroxyeicosatetraenoic acid
HEV	hepatitis E virus
HF	heart failure
HFpEF	heart failure with preserved ejection fraction
HFrEF	heart failure with reduced ejection fraction
HFM	hand, foot and mouth disease
HFMD	hand, foot and mouth disease
HFNC	high flow nasal cannula
HFRS	hemorrhagic fever with renal syndrome
HGB	hemoglobin
HGH	Human Growth Hormone
HGSIL	high-grade squamous intraepithelial lesion
HGV	hepatitis G virus
HGPRTase	hypoxanthine-guanine phosphoribosyl transferase
HH	hemihypertrophy hiatus hernia hitting head
H/H or H&H	hemoglobin and hematocrit
HHS	Hyperosmolar hyperglycemic state
HHT	hereditary hemorrhagic telangiectisia
HHV	human herpesvirus (including numerous subtypes such as HHV8)
HI	homicidal ideation
Hib	haemophilus influenzae B
HIDA	hepatobiliary iminodiacetic acid
HIDS	hyper-IgD (and periodic fever) syndrome
HIE	hypoxic ischemic encephalopathy (cerebral hypoxia)
HIT	heparin-induced thrombocytopenia
HIV	human immunodeficiency virus
HL	hepatic lipase Hodgkin's lymphoma hearing level
HLA	human leukocyte antigen
HLD	Hyperlipidemia
HLHS	hypoplastic left heart syndrome
H&M	hematemesis and melena
HMD	hyaline membrane disease
HMG	human menopausal gonadotropin
HMG-CoA	3-hydroxy-3-methyl-glutaryl-CoA
HMGR	3-hydroxy-3-methyl-glutaryl-CoA reductase
H-mole	hydatidiform mole
HMS	hyperreactive malarial splenomegaly
HMSN	hereditary motor sensory neuropathy
HN	hemagglutinin-neuraminidase
HND	hemolytic disease of the newborn
HNP	spinal disk herniation or herniated disk, that is, herniated nucleus pulposus
HNPCC	hereditary nonpolyposis colorectal cancer
HNPP	hereditary neuropathy with liability to pressure palsy
H/O	history of
HOB	head of bed (usually followed by number of degrees of elevation, e.g., HOB 10°)
HOCM	hypertrophic obstructive cardiomyopathy
HONK	hyperosmolar nonketotic state
HOPI	History of present illness
H&P	history and physical examination (which very often are considered as a pair)
HPA	hypothalamic-pituitary-adrenal axis
HPETE	hydroxyeicosatetraenoic acid
HPF	high-power field (microscopy)
HPI; H/oPI	history of the present illness
HPOA	hypertrophic pulmonary osteoarthropathy (clubbing)
hPL	human placental lactogen (same as human chorionic somatomammotropin)
HPP	hypokalemic periodic paralysis
HPS	hantavirus pulmonary syndrome
HPV	human papillomavirus
HR	heart rate
hr	hour or hours
HRS	Hepatorenal syndrome
HRAS	Harvey rat sarcoma viral oncogene homolog
HRCT	High-resolution computed tomography
HRD	homologous recombination deficiency
HRT	hormone replacement therapy
h.s.	at bedtime (from Latin hora somni)
hs	hours of sleep
HS	High Speed (+HS) (Collisions ≥35mph)
H→S	heel-to-shin test
HSC	human chorionic somatomammotropin (same as human placental lactogen)
HSCT	Hematopoietic stem cell transplantation
HSG	hysterosalpingogram
HSIL	high-grade squamous intraepithelial lesion
HSM	hepatosplenomegaly
HSP	Henoch–Schönlein purpura hereditary spastic paraplegia
HSV	herpes simplex virus
HT	hypertension
Ht	height
HTLV	human T-lymphotropic virus
HTN	hypertension
HTPA	hypothalamic-pituitary-adrenal axis
HTVD	hypertensive vascular disease
HUS	hemolytic uremic syndrome
HVA	homovanillic acid
HVLT	high-velocity lead therapy (facetious term for gunshot wound)
Hx	history (of)
