= Attack on Perim =

Military battle during the South Arabia campaign of World War I

- Part of South Arabian campaign of World War I
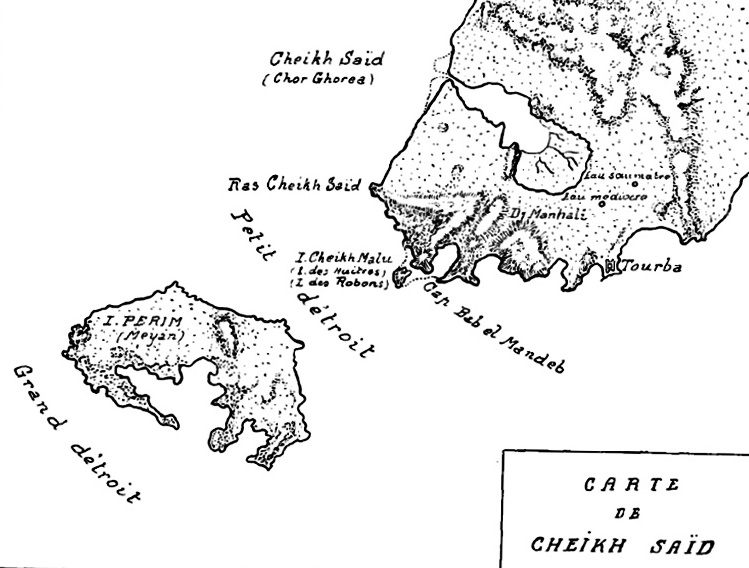
- Cheikh Saïd and Perim
Date	13–15 June 1915
Location	Perim, Bab-el-Mandeb, Red Sea
Result	British victory

Belligerents
Ottoman Empire	(United Kingdom) British Empire; British Raj

Commanders and leaders
Unknown	(British Raj) A. G. C. Hutchinson

Units involved
(Ottoman Empire) VII Corps	(British Raj) 23rd Sikh Pioneers

Strength
~240 men 12 dhows	1 Armed merchantman

Casualties and losses
2 dhows sunk	Unknown

The Attack on Perim (Note: Turkish: Meyun Baskını) (13–15 June 1915) was a military engagement during the South Arabia campaign of World War I, fought between the forces of the Ottoman Empire and the British Empire. Ottoman troops launched an amphibious assault on the island of Perim but were driven off by the British garrison.

== Background ==
When the operation against Fort Turba was completed on 11 November, the 1/23rd Sikh Pioneers went to reinforce the Aden garrison. When a large Arab force re-occupied Cheikh Saïd two weeks after the operations, the Resident prophesied the imminence of an attack against the British garrison on Perim, which, if it materialized, would render the occupation of Cheikh Saïd by British forces "very necessary... for the sake of prestige".

Initially the Viceroy shared the Resident's apprehensions, and in addition to reinforcing Perim, he urged upon the India Office on 1 December 1914 the necessity for an immediate occupation of Cheikh Saïd: such measures would not only safeguard Perim but would also dishearten the enemy. Opinion too in the India Office was opposed to permitting the Arabs to reoccupy Cheikh Saïd on behalf of Turkey.

As intelligence was gathered, it became apparent that earlier fears were exaggerated: on 3 December the Viceroy had no difficulty in convincing the India Office of the impossibility for the Turks of transporting heavy guns by land to Cheikh Saïd. Moreover, it was arranged that the Red Sea Patrol would "frustrate boat attack in any strength" against Perim. The Patrol would also prevent the importation by sea of heavy guns. "In our view the reoccupation of Sheikh Said is therefore unnecessary and is not considered desirable" as it would "irritate" the tribes.

A few days later he argued that a further raid would not "result in any permanent advantage unless there are really heavy guns to be destroyed and we have every reason to believe that this is not the case".

== Prelude ==
On 29 November, No. 2 Company, under the command of Major Ottley, was sent to Perim to take over the defence of the island from the company of the Lancashire Fusiliers, which departed Perim on 9 December together with the detachment of the 108th Infantry. Following the departure of Captain Bannatyne on 16 December, Major Ottley, as the senior military officer on the island, was appointed Assistant Resident, as were many of his successors during the war. In mid-March 1915, No. 1 Company, commanded by Captain Hutchinson, relieved No. 2 Company at Perim. Captain Hutchinson was accompanied by his wife, child, and an Indian nurse.

On 29 May, there was a serious incident when the Subedar-major Balwant Singh and a Subedar Paritam Singh, the two most senior Indian officers in the Company, were shot and killed in their beds at 3 a.m. by a sepoy, Sapper Basakha Singh. An Indian NCO managed to disarm him, and he was taken under escort to Aden on 30 May. He was tried by Special General Court Martial at Aden on 2 June, found guilty, and was hanged at Aden Special Prison on the 7th.

Captain Hutchinson had a number of spies operating on the mainland, and these reported that the Turks were assembling a force at Cheikh Saïd with a view to first bombarding and then attacking Perim.

== Battle ==
On 13 June 1915, unbeknownst to the British, the Turks—having succeeded in bringing large guns to Cheikh Saïd—took the initiative. At 6 p.m. they opened fire and began bombarding Perim from their positions at Cheikh Saïd. They opened with a mixed assortment of guns—estimated at the time to be one 4.7 or 4.1 inch naval gun with a range of 10,000 yards, one 12-pounder with a range of 7,000 yards, and one 3.5 inch howitzer.

These soon found the range, and a good many direct hits were made on the lighthouse and barracks. A total of 211, or as many as 300, shells were fired, (Note: Sources vary on the number of shells fired, from 211 to 300.) but damage was slight, although the lighthouse was put out of action for one night. A direct hit broke 10 of the lantern’s glasses, cracked one of the full diamond glasses, and twisted the rib frame. In reply the Empress of Japan, the Perim guardship, shelled Turkish gun positions, having been provided at Perim with a map, but this failed to prevent the Turks from making attempts to land on the island on the two succeeding days. The Northbrook left Aden at 1 p.m. on the 13th for the defence of Perim but appears not to have taken any part in the action against the Turks on this occasion. After temporary repairs by the Perim Coal Company the lighthouse was back in working order for the night of the 14/15 June.

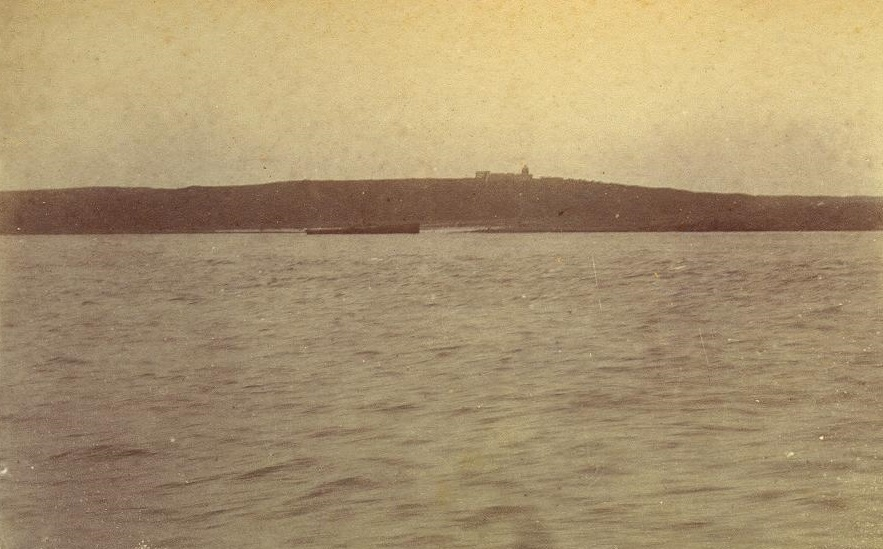
Perim and lighthouse, 1883

During that night, at about 1 a.m., a Turkish force in twelve dhows, each carrying about twenty soldiers and approaching the north coast, attempted to land, and only three men actually got ashore despite being fired on by a piquet. One of the increased alert measures had been to move one of the two 15-pounders to its position on Gun Hill, where it was able to react quickly when the alarm was raised. The Gun Hill battery fired one star shell, which assisted the Empress of Japan in sinking two dhows off Khor Gorrera, the inlet northwest of Cheikh Saïd. Seeing that all hope of surprise was lost, those ashore re-embarked.

In the early hours of the morning, the Turks attempted a landing on the North coast of Perim Island. During their second attempt to land on the island, they were driven off by the 23rd Sikh Pioneers under Captain A. G. C. Hutchinson. The Empress of Japan sailed round from the harbour and set off in pursuit of the dhows but failed to catch them.

== Aftermath ==
The attack against Perim coincided with the Turkish advance into the Aden Protectorate, and it was assumed in India that it formed part of a plan to disperse British forces. The Turks had expected to find Perim "quite unprepared to resist invasion."

The Viceroy feared that if Britain took no retaliatory action, the local Arabs, "thinking we were too weak to protect ourselves or them, would be definitely alienated from our cause," and he advocated on 16 June the despatch, at the earliest opportunity, of a combined army-naval force against Cheikh Saïd. The Northbrook was immediately ordered to make a reconnaissance of the Cheikh Saïd fortifications, but until the results of this were known, the Admiralty could "arrive at no decision" as to whether two suitable vessels were available to undertake action against Cheikh Saïd.

In view of the expected difficulty of providing both troops and ships for the proposed operations against Cheikh Saïd, and since no further Turkish attack had been launched against Perim, the Viceroy recommended that the action be postponed. Moreover, there were additional problems caused by the impossibility of garrisoning Cheikh Saïd after its capture for any effective period, due to the lack of water. The ensuing silence of the Turkish guns indicated that the big gun ammunition had been exhausted, thereby vindicating the Viceroy. The India Office concurred with the Viceroy's view that so long as Perim was secure from attack no immediate action appeared necessary. The General Officer Commanding Aden considered that the safety of Perim could best be secured by keeping a warship in close contact with the island, and in response the Admiralty ordered a warship to remain in the vicinity of Perim.

A matter of concern was that telephone lines between the Outpost HQ and the battery had been cut, it was believed by discontented sepoys after the conviction and hanging of Singh the previous week. The garrison commander reported that the action was conducted without telephonic communication as the equipment had been deliberately damaged. Two days later, 500 men of the 108th Indian Infantry reinforced the defence.

Subsequent to the fiasco of the Aden Moveable Column which resulted in the Turks advancing to just North of Khor Maksar, there was an urgent requirement for the Pioneers to return to Aden in their primary role as light engineers. Therefore on 27 July the two companies of the 1/23rd, in all some 202 men, were recalled to Aden and immediately deployed with the remainder of the battalion on field defence works.

The Turkish troops on the mainland facing the island were subsequently pushed back by troops from Aden supported by the Royal Navy, and by the end of the year all threat to the island of Perim had been removed.

== Sources ==
- Baldry, J. (1978). "British Naval Operations against Turkish Yaman 1914–1919". Arabica. 25 (2): 148–197.
- Pickering, Peter. "Army on Perim in WWI". Perim Island. Wixsite. Archived from the original on 2023-10-10.
- MacMunn, G. F.; Spurgin, A. R. (1936). The History of the Sikh Pioneers, 23rd, 32nd, 34th. United Kingdom: S. Low, Marston.
- Van der Bijl, Nick (2014). British Military Operations in Aden and Radfan: 100 Years of British Colonial Rule. Barnsley, South Yorkshire: Pen & Sword Military. ISBN 9781473843110.
- Connelly, Mark (2011). "British Campaign in Aden, 1914–1918". Scribd.
