= Allen School =

Allen School may refer to:

- Allen School (Asheville, North Carolina), a defunct private high school (1887–1974) in Asheville, North Carolina
- Allen School (La Moille, Illinois), a historic school site in La Moille, Illinois
- Paul G. Allen School of Computer Science and Engineering, a school of the University of Washington, in Seattle, Washington
