= Allen High School =

Allen High School can refer to:

- Allen High School (Nebraska), Allen, Nebraska
- Allen High School (Oklahoma), Allen, Oklahoma
- Allen High School (Texas), Allen, Texas
- Elsie Allen High School, Santa Rosa, California
- Glen Allen High School, Henrico, Virginia
- William Allen High School, Allentown, Pennsylvania
- The Allen School, Asheville, North Carolina

== See also ==
- Allen School
