= Austin High School =

Austin High School may refer to the following American schools:

- Austin High School (Alabama), Decatur, Alabama
- Austin High School (Austin, Pennsylvania)
- Austin High School (Indiana), Austin, Indiana
- Austin High School (Minnesota), Austin, Minnesota
- Austin High School (Nevada), formerly known as Lander County High School, listed on the U.S. National Register of Historic Places
- Austin High School, a school for African Americans that merged to form Austin-East High School in Knoxville, Tennessee
- Stephen F. Austin High School (El Paso, Texas), El Paso, Texas
- Stephen F. Austin High School (Fort Bend County, Texas)
- Stephen F. Austin High School (Houston, Texas), Houston, Texas
- Stephen F. Austin High School (Port Arthur, Texas), Port Arthur, Texas
- Stephen F. Austin High School (Austin, Texas), Austin, Texas
- Austin Catholic High School (Michigan), Ray Township, Michigan
- Austin Catholic Preparatory School, Detroit, Michigan
- Austin Community Academy High School, Chicago, Illinois
- Austin Preparatory School, Reading, Massachusetts

== See also ==
- Austin High School Gang, a group of musicians who attended Austin High School in Chicago
