= Human anti-chimeric antibody =

The human anti-chimeric antibody (HACA) can develop in patients undergoing autoimmune disease therapy with the drug infliximab. This drug can cause the patient to develop antibodies to the medicine itself, which are termed HACAs.

The incidence of developing these antibodies is highest in patients receiving intermittent therapy with infliximab, and lowest in patient receiving continuous therapy and concomitant immunosuppressive therapy.

There is evidence that the presence of these antibodies causes a decrease in efficacy of infliximab and increased risk of infusion reactions.
