= Austen =

Austen may refer to:

- Austen (surname)
- Austen (given name)
