= Anglican High School =

Anglican High School may refer to:

- Anglican High School (Grenada), a secondary girls' school in St. George's, Grenada
- Anglican High School, Singapore, a secondary school in Tanah Merah, Singapore
