= Ashland, Georgia =

Unincorporated community in Georgia, U.S.

Coordinates: 34.3256608°N 83.3557147°W

Ashland is an unincorporated community in Franklin County, in the U.S. state of Georgia.

== History ==
The community served as a rural trading point. A post office called Ashland was established in 1887, and remained in operation until 1953.
