= Arachidonic acid 5-hydroperoxide =

Names
- Preferred IUPAC name (5S,6E,8Z,11Z,14Z)-5-Hydroperoxyicosa-6,8,11,14-tetraenoic acid

Identifiers
CAS Number	74581-83-2
3D model (JSmol)	Interactive image
ChemSpider	4446295
IUPHAR/BPS	2483
MeSH	Arachidonic+acid+5-hydroperoxide
PubChem CID	5280778
UNII	6MV82L5BWU
CompTox Dashboard (EPA)	DTXSID701017279
- InChI: InChI=1S/C20H32O4/c1-2-3-4-5-6-7-8-9-10-11-12-13-14-16-19(24-23)17-15-18-20(21)22/h6-7,9-10,12-14,16,19,23H,2-5,8,11,15,17-18H2,1H3,(H,21,22)/b7-6-,10-9-,13-12-,16-14+ Key: JNUUNUQHXIOFDA-XTDASVJISA-N; InChI=1/C20H32O4/c1-2-3-4-5-6-7-8-9-10-11-12-13-14-16-19(24-23)17-15-18-20(21)22/h6-7,9-10,12-14,16,19,23H,2-5,8,11,15,17-18H2,1H3,(H,21,22)/b7-6-,10-9-,13-12-,16-14+ Key: JNUUNUQHXIOFDA-XTDASVJIBO
- SMILES: O=C(O)CCC[C@H](OO)/C=C/C=C\C\C=C/C\C=C/CCCCC

Properties
Chemical formula	C_{20}H_{32}O_{4}
Molar mass	336.466 g/mol
- Except where otherwise noted, data are given for materials in their standard state (at 25 °C [77 °F], 100 kPa). verify (what is ?) Infobox references

Arachidonic acid 5-hydroperoxide (5-hydroperoxyeicosatetraenoic acid, 5-HPETE) is an intermediate in the metabolism of arachidonic acid by the ALOX5 enzyme in humans or Alox5 enzyme in other mammals. The intermediate is then further metabolized to: a) leukotriene A4 which is then metabolized to the chemotactic factor for leukocytes, leukotriene B4, or to contractors of lung airways, leukotriene C4, leukotriene D4, and leukotriene E4; b) the leukocyte chemotactic factors, 5-hydroxyicosatetraenoic acid and 5-oxo-eicosatetraenoic acid; or c) the specialized pro-resolving mediators of inflammation, lipoxin A4 and lipoxin B4.

Eicosanoid synthesis

== NK Cell Signaling ==
The 5-LOX catalyzed product, 5-HPETE, is capable of restoring a suppressed macrophages only when the natural killer cell activity becomes deactivated. Fatty acids typically weaken some pro-inflammatory mechanism driven by arachidonic acid. When Eicosapentaenoic acid (EPA), a omega-3 fatty acid, competes with arachidonic acid for the enzyme binding sites, less arachidonic acid derivatives are produce. In this case, macrophage failed to activate NK cells. Studies have found that by adding 5-HPETE to the EPA-suppressed macrophages in rats will remove and replace EPA from 5-LOX binding site to restore the function of its ability to activate the NK cell signaling.
