= Austins, Newton Abbot =

English department store

Coordinates: 50.5293°N 3.6119°W

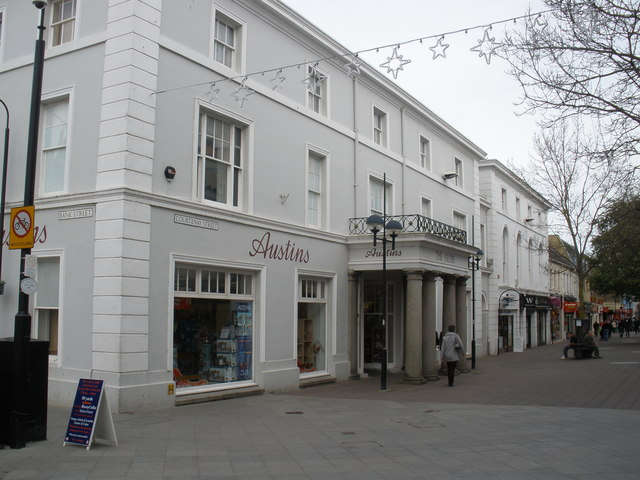
Austins store at the former Globe Hotel, 1 Courtenay Street

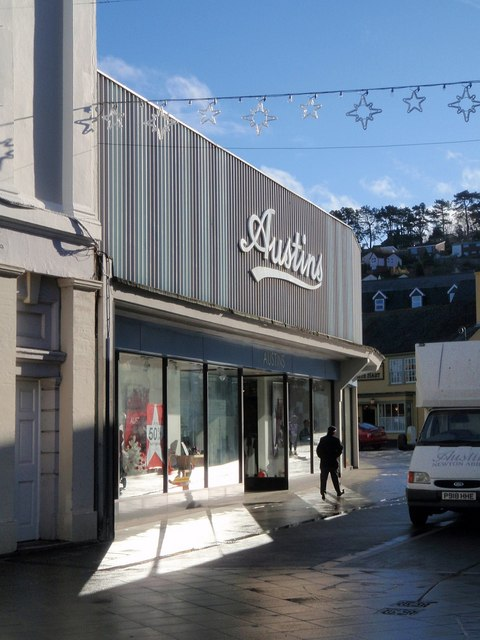
West elevation of the 6-8 Courtenay Street store.

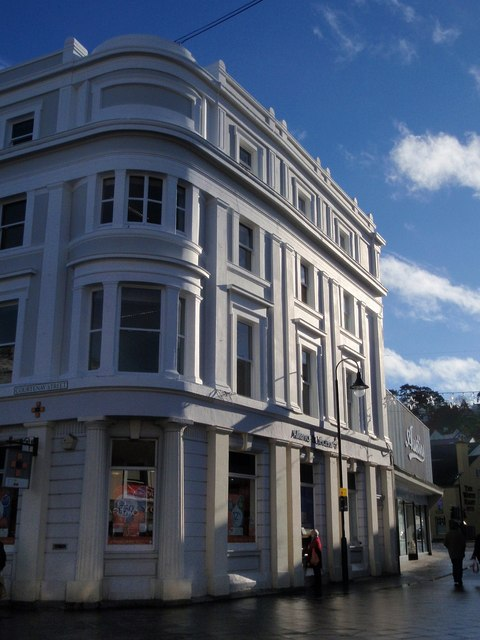
Corner plot at 2-4 Courtenay Street pictured in 2008 when it housed a building society. it is now part of Austins' 6-8 Courtenay Street store.

Austins is a department store in Newton Abbot, Devon. Founded in 1924 as a drapery shop the store has expanded to four locations in one part of the town which has been described as the "Austins Quarter". It is a major employer in the town and the largest independent store in South West England.

== History ==
Austins was founded in 1924 by Robert Charles Austin who sent his son, Charles, to Newton Abbot to establish a new shop for their drapery business. The shop grew to become a department store, one of five in the town during this time. Three successive generations of Austins have run the firm: Charles took over from his father in the 1950s and his son, David Austin, took over in the late 1980s. The store was helped by the closure of the town's House of Fraser branch in 1988. Austins were able to take on some of their rival's cosmetics and fashion brands, customers and staff and sales grew by 50% in the following year.

Austins is a member of the Association of Independent Stores and is the largest independent store in South West England. The store is one of the last four family-owned department stores in Devon. It is a major employer in Newton Abbot, having 65 full-time and 100 part-time staff. Some 30% of the staff have more than 20 years of continuous service with the firm. In recent years the firm has taken steps to improve its environmental performance, installing LED lighting and 1,000 solar panels.

== Locations ==
The store has nine sales floors split across four buildings, totalling 60,000 square feet (5,600 m^{2}) of sales space. It is said to dominate one end of Newton Abbot which has become known as the Austins Quarter.

=== 6-8 Courtenay Street ===
The original Austins store opened on 1 March 1924 in a corrugated steel roofed building at 6 Courtenay Street. It was staffed by the Austin family and three employees. The shop area was doubled by expansion in 1970 and a restaurant was added at the same time. The building now houses the store's ladies fashion, jewellery and beauty departments.

The building dates from the 1850s and has been described as "a striking commercial design". This store now incorporates 2-4 Courtenay Street which was granted protection as a grade II listed building on 6 June 1972.

=== 1 Courtenay Street ===
Austins expanded into 1 Courtenay Street, opposite its original store, in 1992. This was originally a furniture store but now houses the home, baby, luggage, haberdashery and chiropody departments.

The structure was formerly the Globe Hotel, built in 1842 to a design by Charles Fowler. The structure was granted grade II protection as a listed building on 16 July 1949.

=== 8-12 Wolborough Street ===
In 1996 Austins opened a toy department at 8-12 Wolborough Street. A carpet store was added soon afterwards. This site now houses the toys, sports and menswear departments.

=== 15-21 Wolborough Street ===
Austins expanded to 15-21 Wolborough Street in 1999. The site now houses the furniture and carpet departments.
