= Ashland Airport =

Ashland Airport may refer to

- Ashland County Airport in Ashland, Ohio, United States (FAA: 3G4)
- Ashland/Lineville Airport in Ashland/Lineville, Alabama, United States (FAA: 26A)
- Ashland Municipal Airport in Ashland, Oregon, United States (FAA: S03)
- Ashland Regional Airport in Ashland, Kentucky, United States (FAA: DWU)
