= Ashland (Ashland, North Carolina) =

Historic house in North Carolina, United States

- U.S. National Register of Historic Places
- Location within North Carolina Location within the United States
- Location: NC 45, 0.25 miles (0.40 km) north of the junction with NC 1360, near Ashland, North Carolina
- Coordinates: 36°5′22″N 76°46′11″W
- Area: 2 acres (0.81 ha)
- Built: c. 1840
- Architectural style: Greek Revival
- NRHP reference No.: 03000268
- Added to NRHP: April 18, 2003

Ashland is a historic home located near Ashland, Bertie County, North Carolina. It was built about 1840, and is a two-story, five-bay, single-pile Greek Revival-style frame dwelling. It is sheathed in weatherboard and has a gable roof.

It was added to the National Register of Historic Places in 2003.
