= USS Austin =

Three ships of the United States Navy have been named Austin.

- USS Austin (1839), originally a sloop-of-war in the Texas Navy, named in honor of Stephen Fuller Austin
- USS Austin (DE-15), a destroyer escort, named in honor of Chief Carpenter John Arnold Austin
- USS Austin (LPD-4), an amphibious transport dock named for Austin, Texas

== See also ==
- USS Oscar Austin, a Burke-class destroyer, named in honor of Private Oscar P. Austin, posthumously awarded the Medal of Honor
