= Austin, Michigan =

Austin, Michigan may refer to the following places in the U.S. state of Michigan:

- Austin, Hillsdale County, Michigan, an unincorporated community in Amboy Township
- Austin, Kalamazoo County, Michigan, a former community now within the city of Portage
- Austin, Marquette County, Michigan, an unincorporated community near Gwinn
- Austin, Oakland County, Michigan, a former post office in Groveland Township

== See also ==
- Austin Township, Mecosta County, Michigan
- Austin Township, Sanilac County, Michigan
- Port Austin Township, Michigan, in Huron County
