= Ashland Bridge =

Ashland Bridge may refer to:

- Ashland Covered Bridge, also known as Ashland Bridge, in Ashland, Delaware, listed on the National Register of Historic Places in New Castle County, Delaware
- Ashland Bridge (Ashland, Nebraska), a truss bridge from 1936, listed on the National Register of Historic Places in Saunders County, Nebraska
