= Allen School (La Moille, Illinois) =

- U.S. National Register of Historic Places
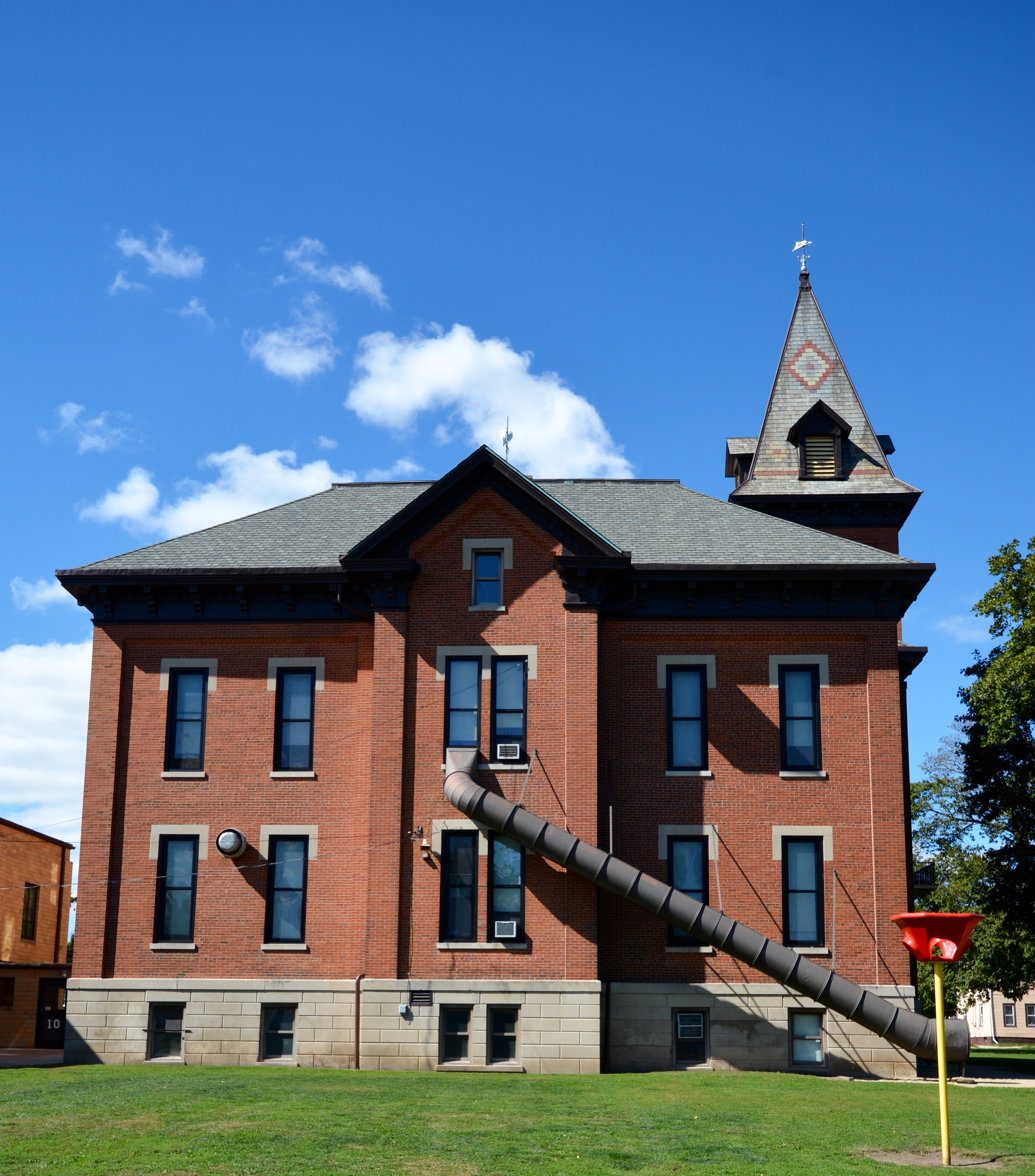

- Location within Illinois Location within the United States
- Location: 301 Main St., La Moille, Illinois
- Coordinates: 41°31′47″N 89°16′48″W
- Area: less than one acre
- Built: 1887
- Built by: Cullwell, T.H.
- Architect: Bryant, Joseph
- NRHP reference No.: 96000081
- Added to NRHP: February 16, 1996

The Allen School is a historic school site located at 301 Main Street in La Moille, Illinois. The school was built in 1887 to relieve overcrowding in what was then La Moille's only school, which had been built in 1858. Funding for the school came from the estate of Joseph Allen, a wealthy local farmer who left $35,000 in his will to provide for the school's construction and maintenance. The school graduated its first class of four students in 1889, and its enrollment reached 201 by 1895. Its assembly hall became the host of major civic events, such as plays, traveling entertainment, and visits by prominent speakers; politicians who visited the school include Cordell Hull and Everett Dirksen. A wave of school consolidation brought new students to the school in the 1940s, and its enrollment grew to 350. The school is still in operation and is the only historic school in La Moille which is still standing.

The school was added to the National Register of Historic Places on February 16, 1996.
