= Austin Airport =

Austin Airport may refer to:

- Austin Airport (Nevada) in Austin, Nevada, United States (FAA: 9U3)
- Austin Executive Airport in Austin, Texas, United States (FAA: EDC)
- Austin Municipal Airport in Austin, Minnesota, United States (FAA/IATA: AUM)
- Austin–Bergstrom International Airport in Austin, Texas, United States (FAA/IATA: AUS)
- Austin Straubel International Airport in Green Bay, Wisconsin, United States (FAA/IARA: GRB)
- Robert Mueller Municipal Airport, the former primary airport in Austin, Texas, United States; closed and redeveloped after Austin–Bergstrom International opened in 1999
