= Perim =

Volcanic island in the Strait of Mandeb

Coordinates: 12.66°N 43.42°E

Native name: Mayyun
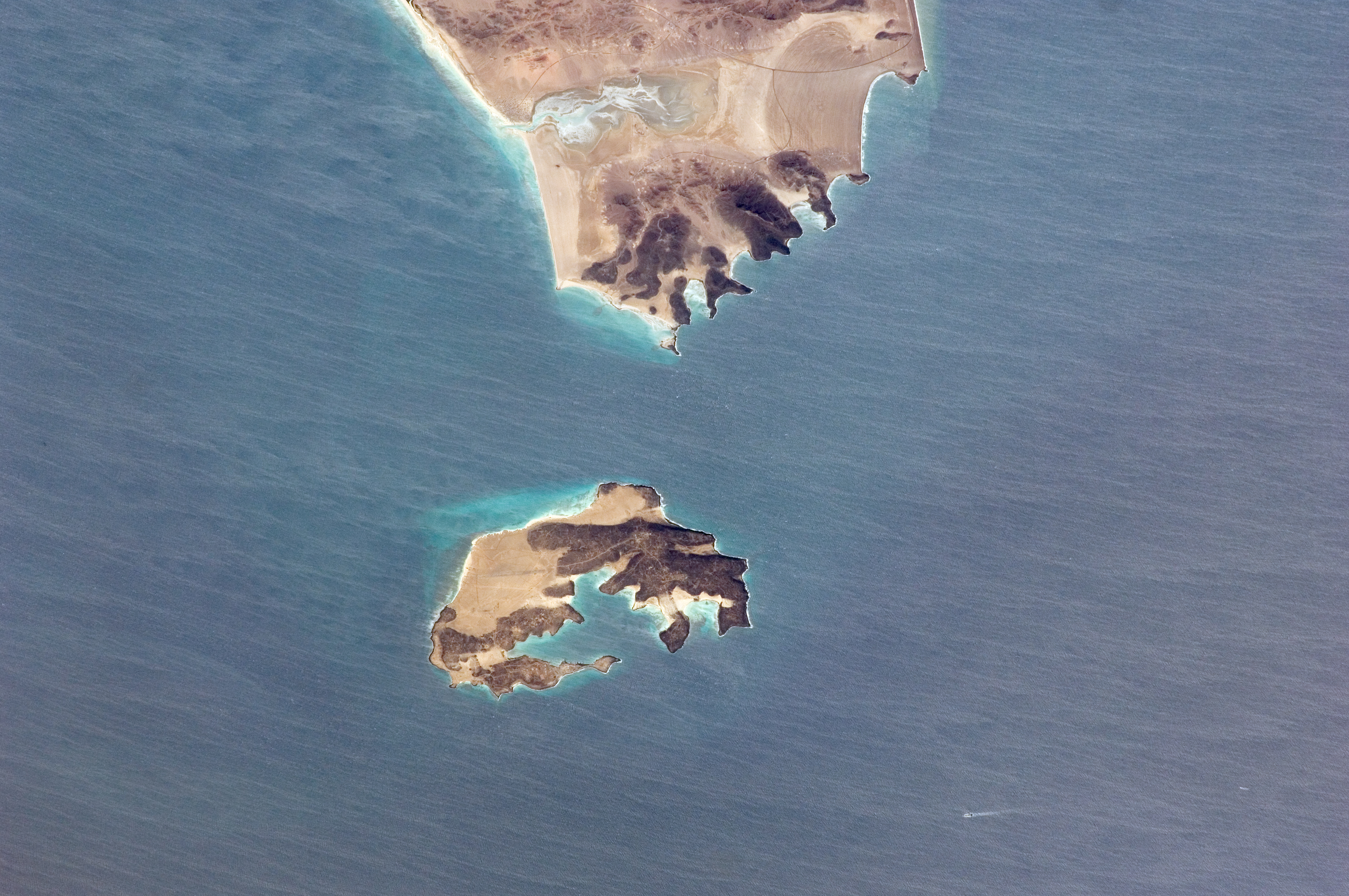
- Interactive map of Perim

Geography
- Location: Bab el-Mandab
- Area: 13 km^{2} (5.0 sq mi)
- Length: 5.63 km (3.498 mi)
- Width: 2.85 km (1.771 mi)
- Highest elevation: 65 m (213 ft)

Administration
- Yemen
- Governorate: Taiz governorate
- District: Bab al-Mandab District

Perim (Arabic: بريم, romanized: Barīm), also called Mayyun (Arabic: جزيرة ميون) in Arabic, is a Yemeni volcanic island in the Strait of Mandeb at the south entrance into the Red Sea, off the south-west coast of Yemen. It administratively belongs to Dhubab District or Bab al-Mandab District, Taiz Governorate. The island of Perim divides the strait of Mandeb into two channels.

The island, as a dependency of Aden Colony, was a part of the British Empire between 1857 and 1967.

== Etymology ==
In ancient times it was called "the island of Diodorus" (Greek: Διοδώρου νῆσος, Latin: Diodori insula). It is mentioned by Pliny the Elder, by the author of the Periplus of the Erythraean Sea and in Ptolemy's Geography. Perim possibly derives from the Arab general term Barim (chain) associated with the history of the Straits and one of its Arab names, the other Arab name being Mayyun.

The Portuguese called it Majun or Meho (derived from Mayun). In 1513, Albuquerque solemnly named the island Vera Cruz. On many British and French maps of the 17th and 18th century the island is called Babelmandel, as the Straits were. Some early 19th century navigation guides still call it the island of Bab-el-Mandeb, although they may mention that it is also called Perim. By the time the British occupied the island in 1857, the name Perim had come into general usage.

== Geology ==
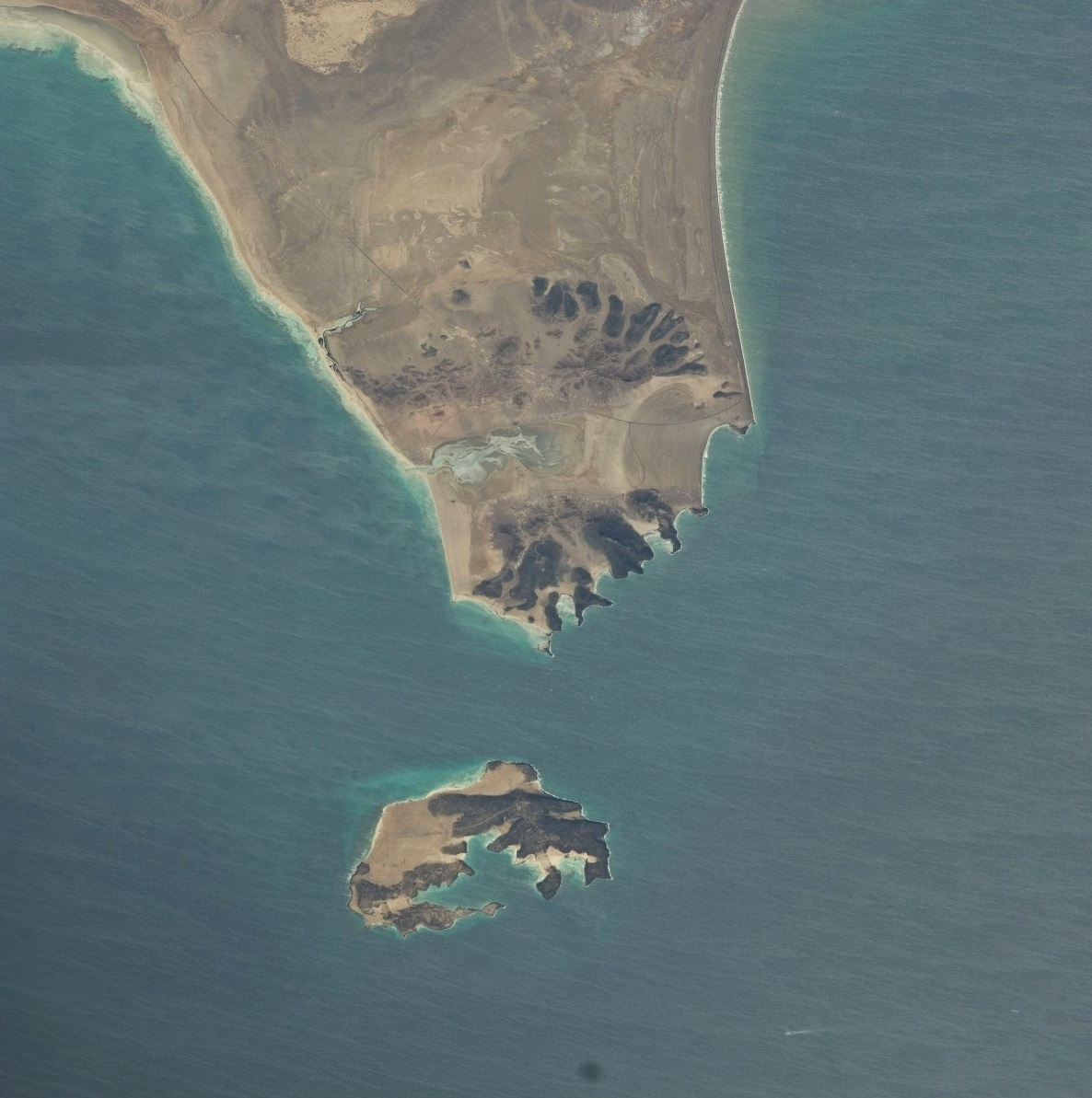
A satellite picture showing Perim and the Cheikh Saïd Peninsula

Perim island is an eroded fragment of the southwest flank of a late Miocene volcano, whose center was on the southwesternmost tip of Arabia. The volcano is the westernmost of the east–west line of six central vent volcanoes (the Aden line) that extends 200 km (125 mi) along the coast of Arabia from Perim to Aden. It is believed that the volcanism is related to an eastward-propagating rift produced before the most recent stage of sea-floor spreading in the Gulf of Aden.

== Geography ==
Perim Island in the Bab al-Mandab Strait, next to Cheikh Saïd peninsula of Yemen. Djibouti and Eritrea are to the west across the strait.

Perim has been described as crab-shaped. The island is 5.63 km (3.50 mi) long and 2.85 km (1.77 mi) wide. It has a surface area of 13 km^{2} (5.0 sq mi) and rises to an altitude of 65 m (213 ft). Perim encloses a deep and comparatively large natural harbour on the southwestern coast. The fishing village of Mayyun is located at the bottom of the bay.

The island divides the 32 km (20 mi) wide Bab-el-Mandeb into two: the Large Strait, with an average width of 17 km (11 mi), and the Small Strait, varying from 2.5 to 5 km (1.6 to 3.1 mi) in width. The Large Strait is generally deep water varying from about 180 m (590 ft; 98 fathoms) or more in the middle channel to about 5.5 to 11 m (18 to 36 ft; 3.0 to 6.0 fathoms) close to the coastal reefs. The depth of the Small Strait varies from 21.9 to 28.3 m (72 to 93 ft; 12.0 to 15.5 fathoms) and is free from navigational changes in the fairway, but strong and irregular tidal streams make navigation hazardous. There have been frequent shipwrecks in the vicinity of Perim, particularly in the Small Strait.

The absence of fresh water on the island has always been one of the major difficulties impeding permanent settlement. Although there are occasional heavy rains, there may be stretches of eight months or more without rain. The long-term average rainfall (in 1821–1912) was about 60 mm (2.4 in) per year. Vegetation is very scarce.

== History ==
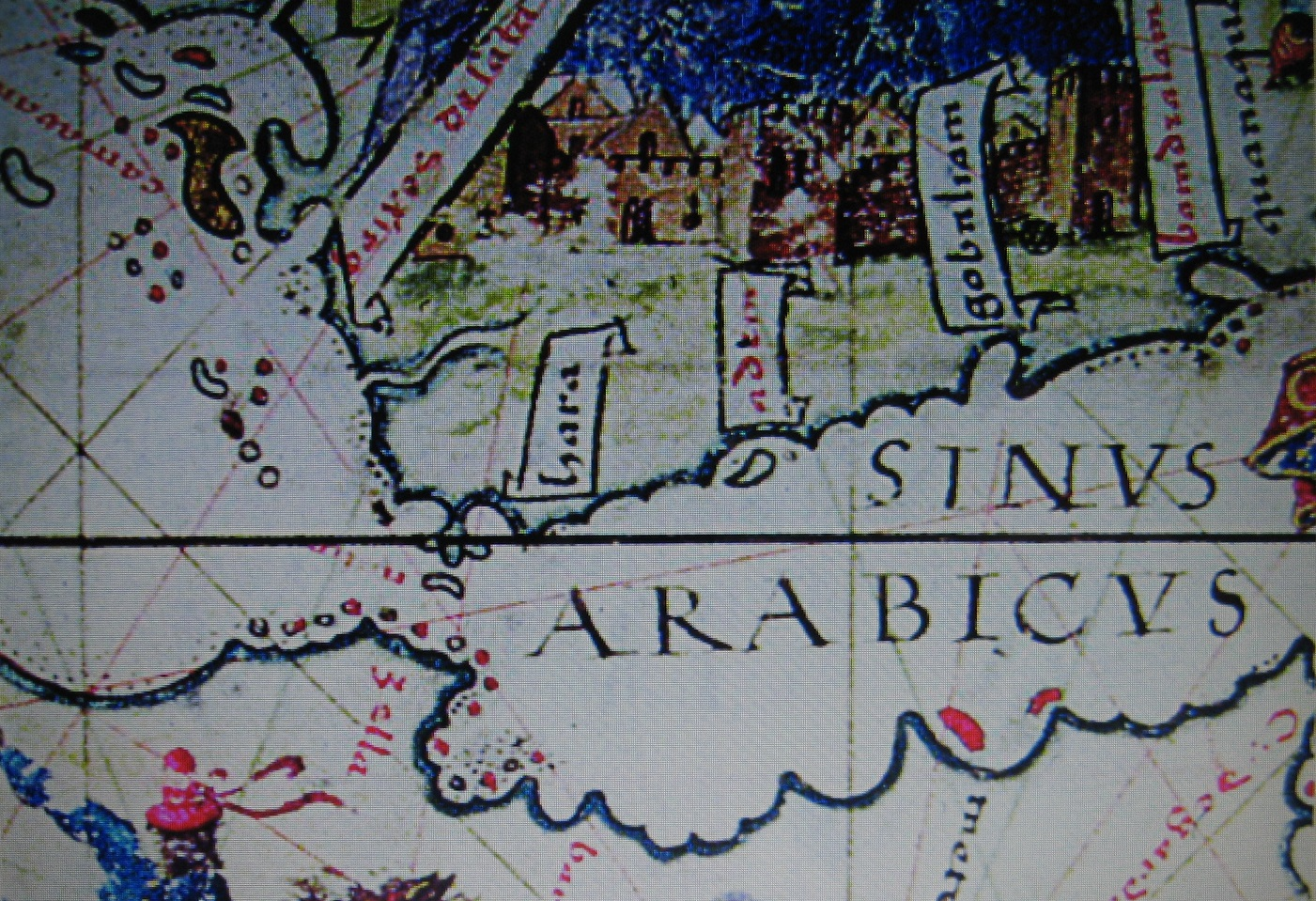
Perim shown on an early Portuguese map

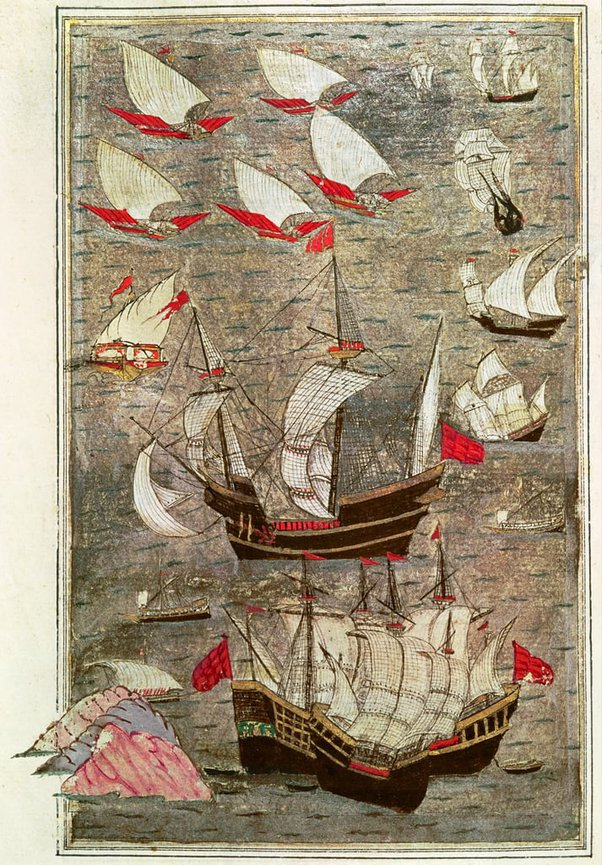
The Ottoman fleet protecting shipping in the Gulf of Aden

The straits of Bab-el-Mandeb were probably witness to the earliest migrations of modern humans out of Africa roughly 60,000 years ago. At this time the oceans were much lower because so much water was frozen in Ice Age glaciers and the straits were much shallower or dry.

Despite its sheltered natural harbour and strategic location at the entrance of the Red Sea, Perim was largely bypassed by written history until the middle of the 19th century, in good part because the bare, waterless island could not easily sustain life. As a result, only fishermen and pearl divers lived there seasonally, building reed huts with material brought from elsewhere.

In 1513, Afonso de Albuquerque, as part of the Portuguese bid to seize control of the trade routes to the Red Sea and the Persian Gulf, attacked Aden near the entrance to the Red Sea but failed to capture the fortified city. Having failed in his main objective, he nonetheless sailed for the Red Sea. The Red Sea pilots of those days lived on an island close to Perim and one was secured by sending forward as a decoy an Indian-built ship. The passage of the first Portuguese ship through the Bab-el-Mandeb was the occasion for much ceremony. After having spent some time at the island of Kamaran in preparation for an attack on Jeddah that could not be carried out due to contrary winds, the fleet left Kamaran on its return journey. Perim, which Albuquerque named Vera Cruz, was inspected and pronounced unfit for a fortress due to lack of water.

During the following years, the Portuguese tried several more times to conquer Aden and gain the mastery of the Red Sea, harassing shipping and battling the Egyptian Mamluk, then Ottoman navies, which gradually gained the upper hand. These actions as well as the sending of an annual fleet to blockade the Bab-el-Mandeb and prevent Indian merchant ships from entering the Red Sea most likely involved frequent use of Perim's natural harbour. By the time the Ottomans captured Aden from its local ruler in 1538, the Ottoman fleet was taking control of the Red Sea, maintaining firm control of the Red Sea, the Bab-el-Mandeb and Aden until the 1630s when the Turks were expelled from Yemen and the south half of the Red Sea.

A French naval squadron might have used Perim's natural harbour in the course of a punitive expedition against nearby Mocha in 1737. In 1799, the island was briefly occupied by the British East India Company in preparation for the invasion of Egypt.

=== Perim under British rule ===
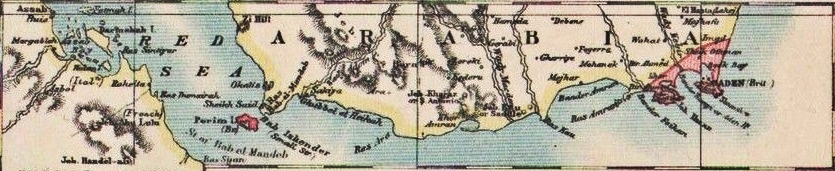
Perim and Aden, coloured red as British possessions in 1899

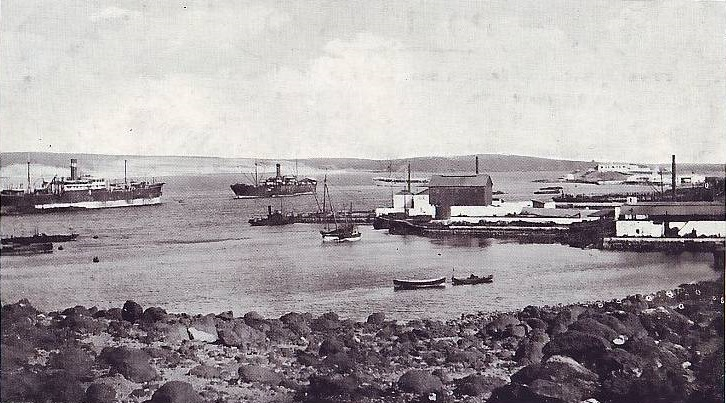
Steamers being coaled at Perim circa 1910

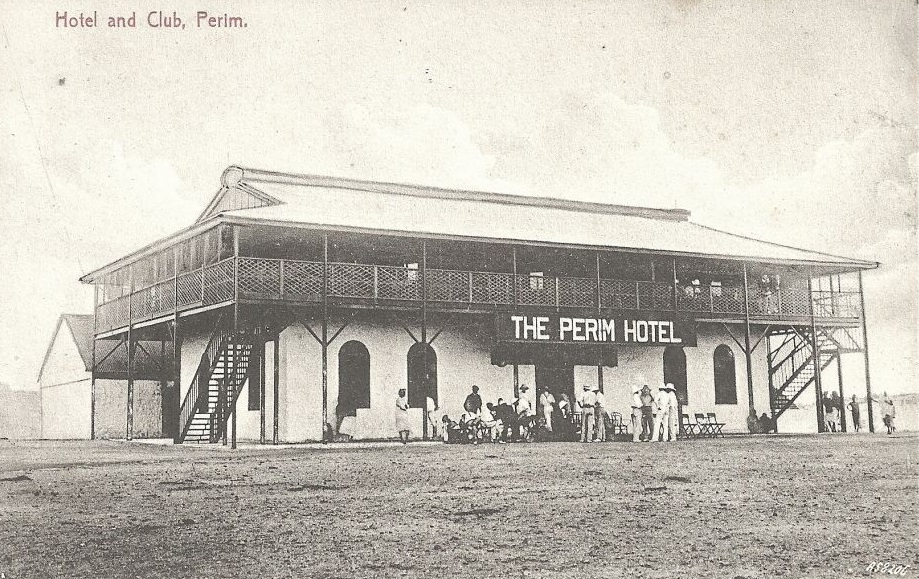
The Perim Hotel, with its bar, billiard room and other amenities, was at the center of Perim's meager social life

In 1856, seeing the French-sponsored Suez Canal project as a method to promote French power at Britain's expense, Prime Minister Palmerston agreed to the occupation of Perim as one of many options to counter assumed French political and military ambitions in Egypt and the Red Sea. In December 1856, Lord Elphinstone, the governor of Bombay, wrote to the Resident of Aden that "on the subject of Perim, [..] we have been directed to occupy the island, and that it is the intention of Her Majesty's government that a lighthouse should be built there." He added that since the island had already been taken possession of in the name of the East India Company in 1799, it was considered as a part of the dependencies of India, and therefore no formalities of any kind was necessary. The Resident immediately proceeded to organize a small landing party for the peaceful occupation of the uninhabited island.

The actual decision to occupy might have been precipitated by an unfounded report that the French, who were said to have been surveying the area for some time, had dispatched a frigate from Réunion to annex the island. The declared reason for the occupation, however, was the urgent need to erect a lighthouse at the entrance of the notoriously dangerous Bab el Mandeb and indeed, after much bickering about the location and other factors, an 11-meter high lighthouse was finally built and inaugurated on 1 April 1861. Despite the lighthouse's operation, the treacherous waters around Perim continued to claim many vessels.

Perim was attached to Aden, itself a dependency of the Bombay Presidency, British India. For the next two decades, the only sign of British occupation was the lighthouse and a small detachment from the Aden garrison. Otherwise, the barren waterless island was left to the few fishermen and Somali herders who went there. Occasional proposals by an Aden coaling company to open a branch on the island did not materialize.

While Aden had a fine natural harbour, it became ineffective starting in the mid-19th century as iron and steel ships of greater draught were being built. Starting in the 1860s, many of the larger steamers had to stay well off Aden Harbour, making the process of coaling and taking in provisions both time-consuming and hazardous. This deficiency was not to be overcome until dredging projects began in earnest in the early 1890s.

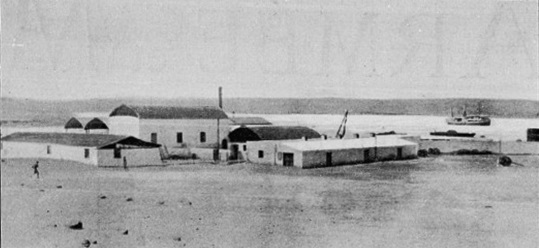
Naval repair facility c. 1900

In 1881, a complete outsider, Hinton Spalding of London, was granted permission to start a coaling station on Perim, whose inner harbour could accommodate vessels of any draught. With the backing of a number of large ship-owners, he launched the Perim Coal Company (PCC) and on 29 August 1883 Perim Harbour supplied coal provisions to its first steamer. This marked the beginning of a struggle between Aden and Perim for the Red Sea coaling business that was to be waged by the two ports until the mid-1930s.

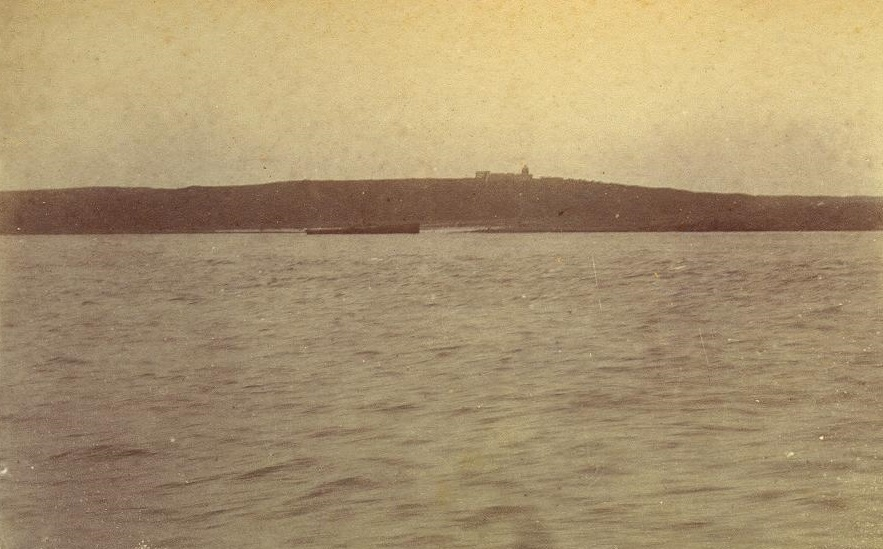
Perim island and lighthouse in the 1880s

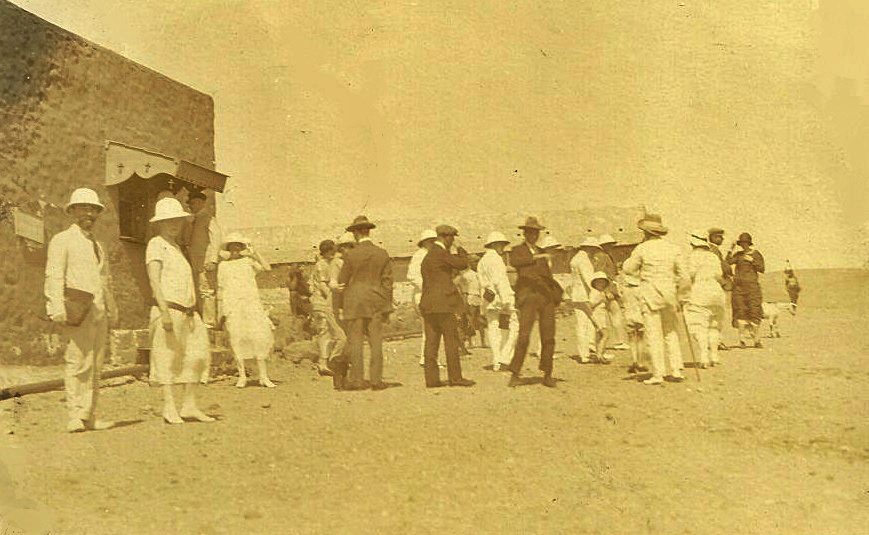
Passengers ashore while their ship is being refuelled

During those 50 years, Perim was to be entirely geared for supplying coal: the harbour, roads and accommodation for workers were laid out for this purpose only. As for Perim's lack of water, it was no more a drawback than at Aden: both ports supplied water from condensers to the ships since Aden water, delivered from out of town, was considered too brackish for the purpose. Before long the PCC was also able to grab the lion's share of the salvage business due to it being very near the most dangerous waters in the area.

Between 1923 and 1927 more coal was being loaded at Perim than at Aden. However, Perim's decline came fast due to its failure to grab a share of the fast-growing oil fuel business that was cornered by Aden as coal-burning steamers were being retired. The PCC went bankrupt in 1935 and Perim slipped back into insignificance.

During the First World War, the Ottoman Turks in Arabia sent a force to threaten Aden and the British communications along the Red Sea. This included an assault on Perim on the 14 and 15 June 1915 when Turks landed on the north coast of the island. They were driven off by a detachment of the 23rd Sikh Pioneers garrisoned on the island under the command of Captain A.G.C. Hutchinson. The troops on the mainland facing the island were subsequently pushed back by troops from Aden supported by the Royal Navy and by the end of the year all threat to the island of Perim had been removed.

In 1964 Perim took on a new role, it became the base for the British Middle East Relay Station. This was built by the British Diplomatic Wireless Service to be a relay station for the World Service of the BBC. The station had been previously based in Somalia and called the East Africa Relay Station but was closed after a disagreement between the new Somali and the British Governments. The same transmitters were used in both stations and were sent back to the DWS main technical base at Crowborough in the UK for a thorough service prior to being set up again on Perim.

The base was built from scratch with new large diesel fuel storage tanks being situated in the port area and a supply pipeline installed to serve the Deltic generators at the transmitter site. 20 prefabricated houses were built on the western side of the island next to the transmitter site for the engineers and their families. In addition two small barrack blocks provided accommodation for the platoon of Aden based soldiers that were on a two week ‘RnR rotation’ to provide security. The foundations for all these buildings are still visible on Google Earth.

The station was resupplied by three Aden Airways Dakota flights each week, as there were no shops on the Island these delivered food supplies from the NAAFI in Aden and took engineers and their families to and from Aden on resupply trips. The Army platoon was flown in and out on a combination of Blackburn Beverly, Scottish Aviation Twin Pioneer and De Havilland Beaver flights.

The station started regular broadcasting in early 1965 on 701kHz, the same frequency that had been earlier used in Somalia. Power was likely around 100 kW and was capable of being heard in Australia and New Zealand in the early morning. A disastrous fire broke out in late summer 1965 when one of the main Deltic generators threw a rod. The resulting fire prevented enough power being produced to maintain the broadcast service. While options for the future were being considered many of the British staff were flown to Francistown in Botswana (then Bechuanaland) on a temporary basis to build a small transmitter to broadcast BBC World Service into what was Rhodesia, that country having declared Unilateral Declaration of Independence (UDI) in November 1965.

In the light of the fire damage and the deteriorating security situation in Aden it was decided to move the transmitters up the coast to the Omani island of Masirah. The Perim station was shut down and the transmitters moved before the end of 1966.

The British presence continued until 1967 when the island became part of the People's Republic of Southern Yemen. Before the handover, the British government had put forward before the United Nations a proposal for the island to be internationalised as a way to ensure continued security of passage and navigation in the Bab-el-Mandeb, but it was refused.

=== Island under Southern Yemeni control ===
Soon after independence in November 1967, South Yemen extended its territorial waters to 12 miles, which would include the waters between Perim and the mainland. Despite fears expressed by the British government and others, there was no interference with international shipping, until 1971 when the new radical Marxist government of what was now the People's Democratic Republic of Yemen (PDRY) allowed a group of PFLP guerillas to attack an Israel-bound tanker in the Bab-el-Mandeb from Perim.

During the October War, South Yemeni artillery on Perim, along with Egyptian naval units, imposed an undeclared blockade at the southern entrance of the Red Sea. However, after the 1973 blockade, there were to be no further cases of interference with international shipping. The PDRY established close political and military ties with the Soviet Union which resulted in Soviet naval forces gaining access to the former British naval base at Aden as well as to the islands of Perim and Socotra. This strong Soviet military presence faded rapidly after the 1986 military coup in South Yemen and the advent of Perestroika under Mikhail Gorbachev.

=== 2015 Yemen Civil War ===
==== Houthi control ====
After the Houthi takeover in Yemen, the Houthis moved to capture Perim island to consolidate their influence and gain access to the important trade route across the Bab-el-Mandeb strait. Most of Perim's 4,500 native inhabitants, were originally banished from the island when the Soviet Union's military base was in operation. After the beginning of the 2015 Yemen civil war, some of the originally displaced Perim natives joined the Saudi-led intervention in Yemen to regain the island from the Houthis.

The local Yemeni inhabitants launched an assault on the Houthis with the support of the United Arab Emirates Armed Forces. The native Perim islanders eventually defeated the Houthis in a violent battle that lasted a couple of hours and led to a power plant being destroyed. The Houthis accused the Saudi-led coalition of being "invaders". The Houthis planted multiple mines in the island and according to the local native leader, they still pose a threat to the resumption of normal life on the island. In 2026, the Houthis retook the island.

==== United Arab Emirates control ====
The island was under the control of the United Arab Emirates Armed Forces as part of the Saudi-led intervention in Yemen from 2015 until their drawback from Yemen in 2019. In 2019, control of the island was handed to Saudi Arabia and the Yemeni Coast Guard. It was reported that in 2016 there had been an attempt to create an airbase with a 10,000 ft (3,000 m) runway in the north of the island. It was believed that project was abandoned in 2017 with some structures and the runway outline visible. Satellite images from February 2021 revealed construction had begun on a separate, approximately 6,000 ft (1,800m), runway near this project.

==== Yemeni National Resistance Forces control ====
In May 2021 Yemeni military officials stated that the United Arab Emirates was building the runway. However, based on a statement on the Saudi state news agency SPA, it was subsequently reported the construction was being carried out by the Saudi-led coalition to secure the area. In response to Yemeni officials saying the United Arab Emirates was behind the air base, the Saudi-led coalition spokesperson stated that it had established a presence on the island to counter threats to maritime trade from Houthis and dismissed reports that UAE forces were on the island, stating that UAE efforts were focused on providing air support for coalition operations in Marib instead.

In 2021, Tareq Saleh, a Yemeni military commander of the Yemeni National Resistance Forces, stated in an interview that his units of the National Resistance Forces are deployed in Perim and they are affiliated with the Yemeni Coast Guard. On 11 September 2026 media sources reported the capture of Perim by Houthi forces.

== Climate ==
Climate data for Perim (Barim Island)
Month	Jan	Feb	Mar	Apr	May	Jun	Jul	Aug	Sep	Oct	Nov	Dec	Year
Mean daily maximum °C (°F)	28.9 (84.0)	29.4 (84.9)	30.6 (87.1)	32.2 (90.0)	35.0 (95.0)	36.7 (98.1)	37.2 (99.0)	36.7 (98.1)	36.1 (97.0)	33.3 (91.9)	31.1 (88.0)	29.4 (84.9)	33.1 (91.5)
Daily mean °C (°F)	26.4 (79.5)	26.7 (80.1)	27.8 (82.0)	29.2 (84.6)	31.7 (89.1)	33.1 (91.6)	33.6 (92.5)	33.3 (91.9)	32.5 (90.5)	30.3 (86.5)	28.3 (82.9)	27.0 (80.6)	30.0 (86.0)
Mean daily minimum °C (°F)	23.9 (75.0)	23.9 (75.0)	25.0 (77.0)	26.1 (79.0)	28.3 (82.9)	29.4 (84.9)	30.0 (86.0)	30.0 (86.0)	28.9 (84.0)	27.2 (81.0)	25.6 (78.1)	24.4 (75.9)	26.9 (80.4)
Average rainfall mm (inches)	5 (0.2)	3 (0.1)	5 (0.2)	3 (0.1)	2 (0.1)	2 (0.1)	3 (0.1)	5 (0.2)	13 (0.5)	3 (0.1)	3 (0.1)	3 (0.1)	50 (2.0)
Average relative humidity (%)	71	72	73	74	72	71	69	68	74	72	71	73	72
Mean daily sunshine hours	9.2	9.1	8.7	8.4	7.7	8.3	6.3	6.2	7.2	9.1	8.4	9.3	8.2
Source: Arab Meteorology Book

== Development ==
=== Yemen-Djibouti Bridge Project ===
In 2008, a $200-billion mega-project for the construction of a transcontinental bridge linking Yemen and Djibouti via Perim Island, the Bridge of the Horns, was announced by a Dubai-based company, Al Noor Holding Investments. At around 28.5 km (17.7 mi), it would be one of the longest bridges in the world and its suspension portion the longest. In June 2010, it was announced that the start of Phase I, the 3.5-kilometre-long (2.2 mi) bridge between the mainland of Yemen and Perim, was delayed indefinitely until a framework agreement between Djibouti and Yemen could be signed.

== See also ==
- List of islands of Yemen
- List of islands in the Red Sea
