= PS City of Ashland =

Sidewheel paddle steamer that sank in Lake Superior,

Coordinates: 46.6850°N 90.8252°W

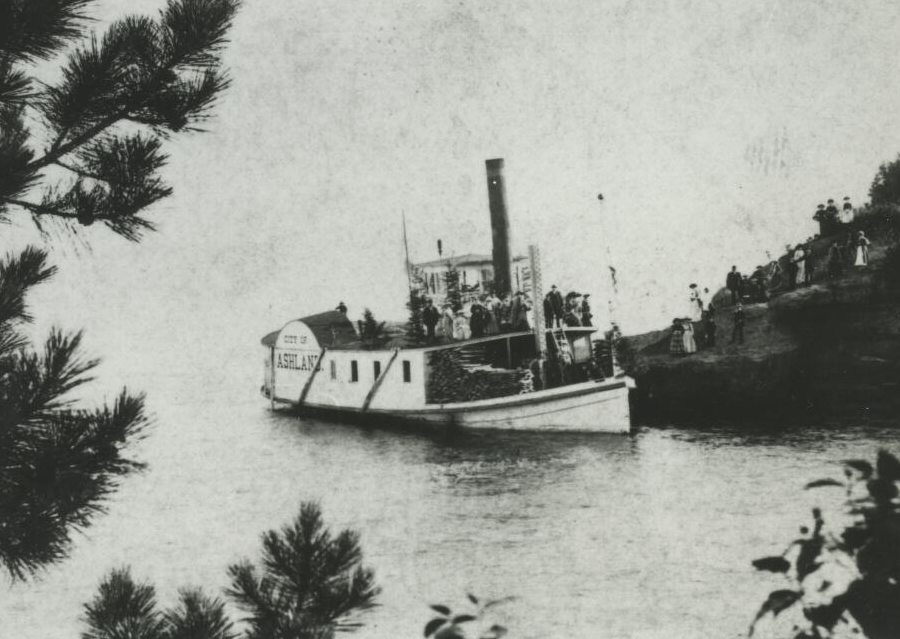
- The only known image of the City of Ashland

History
- Name: City of Ashland
- Namesake: Ashland, Wisconsin
- Owner: Superior Lumber Company, Ashland, Wisconsin
- Port of registry: United States
- Launched: 1883
- Fate: Burned to the waterline on the 8th of August 1887

General characteristics
- Type: Paddle steamer
- Tonnage: 84.62 tons
- Length: 90 feet (27 meters)
- Beam: 20 feet (6.1 meters)
- Depth: 7 feet (2.1 meters)
- Depth of hold: 21 feet (6.4 meters)
- Propulsion: Steam engine, sidewheel

City of Ashland was a sidewheel paddle steamer that sank in Chequamegon Bay, Lake Superior, off Ashland, Wisconsin. The ship was named for Ashland, a port community. The wreckage remains at the bottom of the bay, close to the ship's namesake city.

== History ==
City of Ashland was built in 1883 and owned by the Superior Lumber Company, located in Ashland. The ship primarily was used for timber rafting. As timber was harvested around the Bad River area of Wisconsin, the logs would collect near the shore, where City of Ashland would pick them up and tow them in rafts to the sawmill in Ashland. The ship was a common sight around the Chequamegon Bay area.

On August 8, 1887, City of Ashland was returning to Ashland while pulling a raft of logs. At a point about three nautical miles (5.5 km) northeast of Washburn, Wisconsin, a fire was discovered at the rear of the pilothouse. The entire ship was engulfed in flames within minutes. Hundreds of people lined the shore to view the emergency. As the flames quickly began to consume almost the entire ship, the crew had no choice but to jump into the cold water of Lake Superior. Several ships came to their rescue, including Cyclone and S. B. Barker. Most of her crew survived, but crewman Fred Ebert drowned.

The origin of the fire remains a mystery and the ship's wreck remains under the waters of Lake Superior.

== See also ==
- List of shipwrecks in the Great Lakes
- Apostle Islands
