= Austin Township =

Austin Township may refer to:

- Austin Township, Conway County, Arkansas, in Conway County, Arkansas
- Austin Township, Macon County, Illinois
- Austin Township, Mecosta County, Michigan
- Austin Township, Sanilac County, Michigan
- Austin Township, Minnesota
- Austin Township, Cass County, Missouri
- Austin Township, Mountrail County, North Dakota, in Mountrail County, North Dakota
