= Ashland High School =

Ashland High School may refer to:

== In the United States ==
- Ashland High School (Kansas) in Ashland, Kansas
- Ashland High School (Louisiana) (1907–1981), Natchitoches Parish, Louisiana
- Ashland High School (Massachusetts), Ashland, Massachusetts
- Ashland High School (Mississippi), Ashland, Mississippi
- Ashland-Greenwood High School, Ashland, Nebraska
- Ashland High School (Ohio), Ashland, Ohio
- Ashland High School (Oregon), Ashland, Oregon
- Ashland High School (Wisconsin), Ashland, Wisconsin
- Paul G. Blazer High School, Ashland, Kentucky is the successor to the former Ashland High School, and as such is often referred to as "Ashland High School"
