= Austin Catholic High School (Michigan) =

Location
- 25925 23 Mile Road; Chesterfield, Michigan 48051; United States
- 42°43′7″N 82°52′6″W

Information
- Other name: ACHS
- Type: Private, Highschool
- Mottoes: Minds to Lead, Mouths to eat, Hands to Serve, Hearts to Love
- Religious affiliation: Christian / Catholic
- Established: 2011
- Oversight: Roman Catholic Archdiocese of Detroit
- Chair: N/A
- Principal: Ms. Carolyn Balzano
- Grades: 9–12
- Gender: Mixed-sex education
- Enrollment: 80
- Campus size: Elementary
- Campus type: etc
- Colors: Navy Blue and White
- Mascot: Crusader
- Nickname: Crusaders
- Newspaper: Crusader News
- Website: www.austincatholichighschool.org

Austin Catholic High School (ACHS) is a private, Roman Catholic, co-educational, college-preparatory high school in Chesterfield, Michigan, United States. It was established in 2011 and is part of the Roman Catholic Archdiocese of Detroit.
