= Khawlani Coffee Beans =

Type of coffee bean

- Origin: Khawlan region of northwestern Yemen and southwestern Saudi Arabia

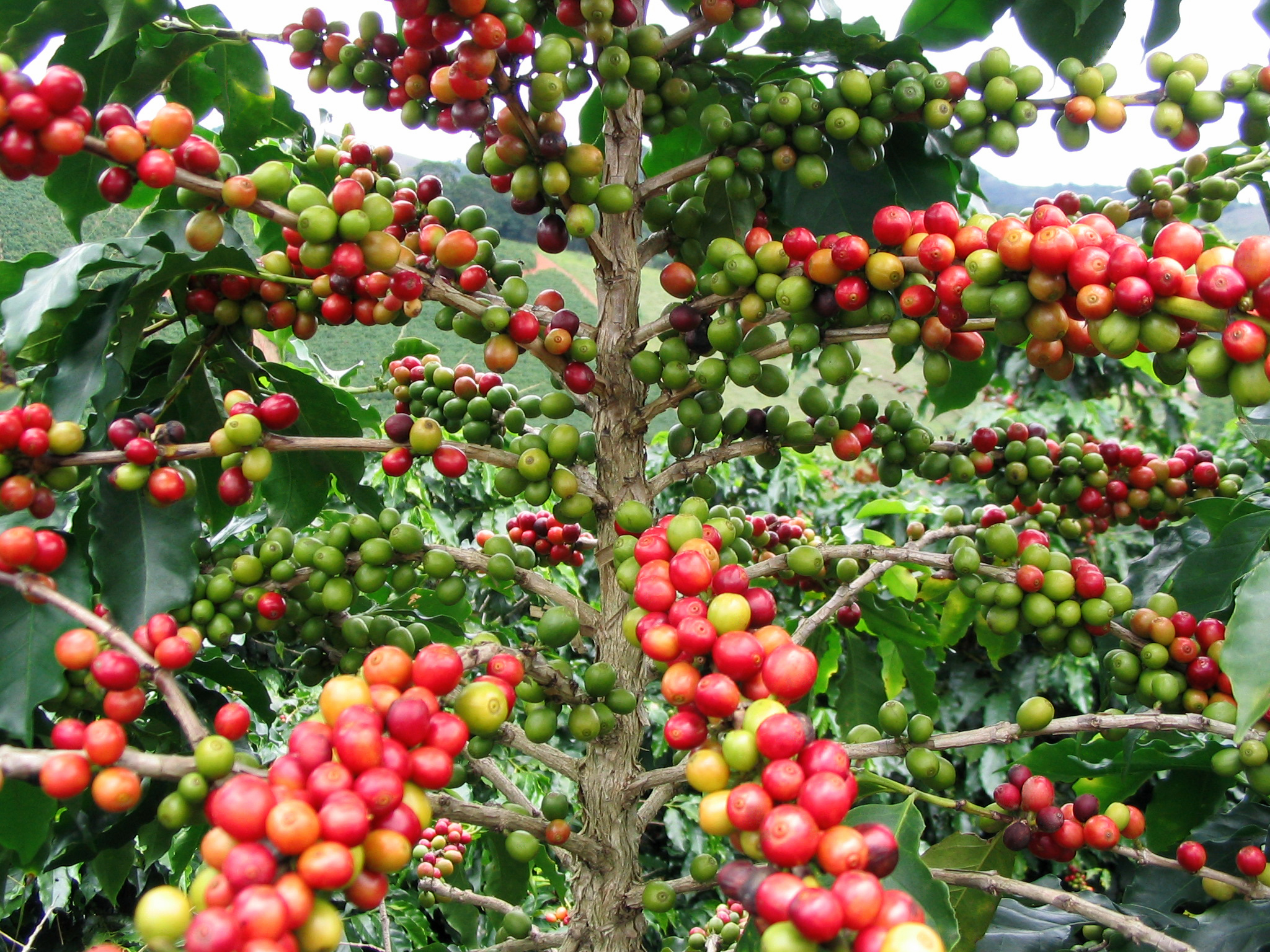
Khawlani coffee fruits

Khawlani Coffee Beans (Arabic: البن الخولاني) are a type of coffee bean cultivated in the region of the Khawlan mountains (Sarat Khawlan). These mountains spread from the southwestern part of Saudi Arabia to the northwestern part of Yemen. The province of Jazan in Saudi Arabia, and the governorate of Saada in Yemen are where these mountains are situated. Those are main regions for the cultivation of this type of coffee due to the presence of all the geographical and climatic conditions required for its cultivation. The mountainous soil is rich in the necessary nutrients to give the coffee its distinctive flavour. The Khawlani coffee is characterised by an oily layer as well as its well-known and distinctive odour.

== History ==
Knowledge and practices related to cultivating Khawlani coffee beans
- UNESCO Intangible Cultural Heritage
- Country: Saudi Arabia
- Reference: 01863
- Region: Arab States

Inscription history
- Inscription: 2022 (17th session)
- List: Representative

The production of the Khawlani coffee bean comes from the mountainous regions of Jazan, Al Baha, and Asir, in the Saudi Arabian part. In the south of the Kingdom, specialists have determined the age of Khawlani coffee bean cultivation to be more than eight centuries old, with Jazan Port being one of the most expensive Arab coffee outlets.

== Cultural significance and practices ==
Khawlani coffee cultivation is also associated with social and cultural practices among Khawlani communities. According to UNESCO, knowledge related to planting and processing the beans has been transmitted within families and across generations, and coffee is commonly linked with hospitality, generosity and respect for guests. The cultivation process also has a communal dimension, as farmers exchange knowledge and support each other during planting, harvesting and processing. A 2023 academic study on the Khawlani coffee value chain in the Jazan region similarly described the preparation and serving of the coffee as deeply embedded within Saudi national identity and traditions.

== Harvesting ==
The harvest phase of the Khawlani coffee tree crop begins during the annual harvest season, which runs from October to January. It takes approximately 3 years for the newly planted coffee trees to bear fruit. The ripening fruits are harvested and placed in a sheepskin bag or a special plastic jar, then dried in designated areas, preferably in the shade with less sunlight, and stirred for 3 weeks to retain their flavour.

== Agricultural production and export ==
=== Saudi Arabia ===
The coffee sector accounted for about 0.86 percent of Saudi Arabia's gross domestic product in 2020 and is expected to rise to 6.18 percent over the next five years. The Kingdom produces about 300 tons of high-quality Khawlani coffee beans a year, which are consumed locally and exported to the Gulf Cooperation Council countries.

Al-Dayer governorate, located in the eastern part of the Jazan region, occupies first place in the Kingdom of Saudi Arabia for the number of farms and Khawlani coffee trees, with a number of 994 farms that embrace more than 218,000 coffee trees, to produce more than 600,000 kilos of Khawlani coffee per year.

In the latest statistics on coffee production and the number of farms and trees in the Kingdom of Saudi Arabia for the year 2019, the GDP of Coffea Arabica reached 646 tons, and the number of coffee farms reached 847 farms containing 100,000 coffee trees, including 82,390 fruit trees.

Sixty-five percent of farmers in the mountains of Jazan are from the Al-Dayer governorate, according to the Jazan Mountain Development and Reconstruction Authority. The second largest number hail from Fayfa at 12 percent, followed by the governorates of Al- Reeth, Al-Edabi, Al-Aridhah and Harub. The number of coffee trees reached 160 thousand, of which 82,000 bear fruit, with a production volume of 330 tons for 2020.

There are more than 171,380 coffee trees in the Jazan region, of which 122,455 are in the Al-Dayer governorate. These produce up to 685,536 tons of coffee beans. However, the Al-Dayer area produces more than 489,820 tons of coffee beans, making it the capital of the Khawlani coffee beans in the Kingdom. There are over 1,596 coffee tree farmers in the Jazan region, and more than 919 of these are located in the Al-Dayer governorate.

== Inscription on UNESCO ==
On November 30, 2022, the Kingdom of Saudi Arabia succeeded in inscribing "Knowledge and practices related to cultivating Khawlani coffee beans" element on the Representative List of the Intangible Cultural Heritage of the United Nations Educational, Scientific and Cultural Organization (UNESCO).
