= Jazan University =

Public research university in Jazan, Saudi Arabia

- جامعة جازان
- Type: Public
- Established: 2006; 20 years ago
- Endowment: $381million
- President: Dr. Mari Hussein Al-Qahtani
- Students: 60,000
- Location: Jazan, Saudi Arabia; 16.928°N 42.589°E
- Campus: Urban 5,277 acres (21.36 km^{2})
- Colors: Jazan Gold, Blue
- Website: www.jazanu.edu.sa

Jazan University (commonly referred to as JazanU) is a public research university based in the city of Jazan in Saudi Arabia. Founded in 2006, it is the province's only university and one of the largest public, nonprofit institutions of higher education in the country. JazanU has a main central campus that rests by the Red Sea on the southwest coast of Saudi Arabia and also has satellite campuses in Sabya, Abu ʽArish, Farasan, Ad-darb, Samtah, Al-Daer and Al-Ardah.

JazanU offers a broad range of academic departments, an extensive research enterprise and a number of community outreach and public service programs. It is particularly well known for its medical school, dental school, school of business, its social sciences and humanities programs, as well as its biomedical teaching and research capabilities.

== Academics ==
University includes (23) faculties, including: (21) colleges granting bachelor's degree to male and female students, and one college granting diploma degree, and these colleges and scientific departments are:

- College of Applied Medical Sciences.

Faculty of Physical Therapy

- College of Health Sciences.
- College of Pharmacy.
- College of Dentistry.
- College of Medicine.
- College of Computer Sciences & Information Systems.
- College of Education.
- College of Engineering.
- College of Administrative Sciences.
- College of Languages.
- College of Science and Arts.
- College of Sharia.
- College of Science and Arts of Farasan.
- College of Science and Arts of Samtah.
- College of Science and Arts of Ad-darb.
- College of Science and Arts of Al Dayer
- Community college.
- College of Business Administration

=== Former Rectors ===
The following individuals have served as the rectors of the university since its inception:

Rectors	From	Up To
Prof.Mohammed Alhayaza	2007	2014

== Controversies ==
In 2017, Jazan University announced the construction of a fountain with an operational costs reaching 170 millions. This caused outrage from local residents and students as they were demanding funds to be allocated to the construction of student housing and college buildings.

== See also ==
- List of universities and colleges in Saudi Arabia
