= Abu 'Arish =

Abu ʽArish
- city
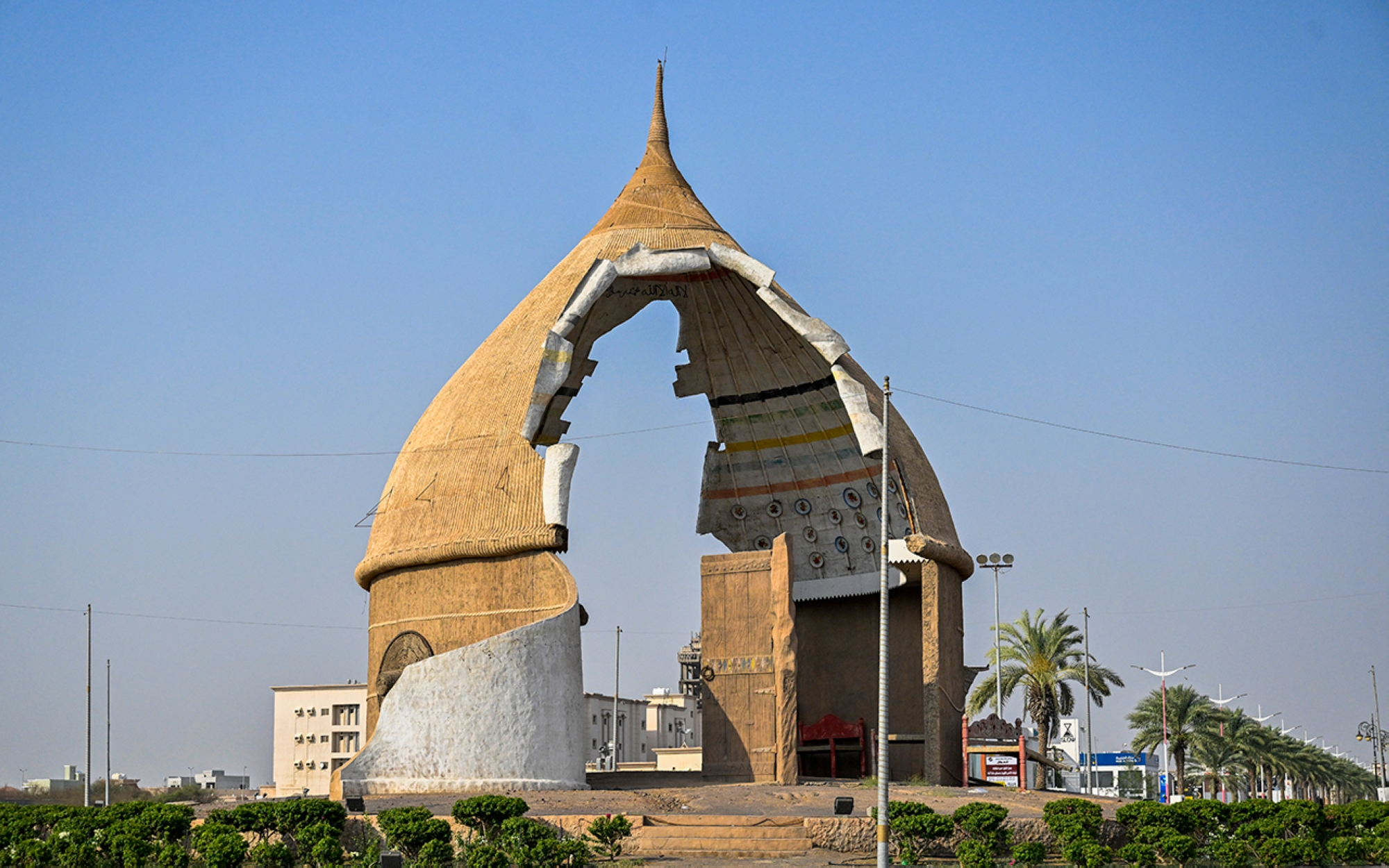
- Al-Asha Square, one of the landmarks in Abu Arish

- Location in Saudi Arabia
- Coordinates: 16°58′08″N 42°49′57″E
- Country: Saudi Arabia
- Province: Jizan
- Time zone: UTC+3 (EAT)
  - Summer (DST): UTC+3 (EAT)

Abu ʽArish (Arabic: أبو عريش) is a city in Jizan Province, in south-western Saudi Arabia. Historically, Abu `Arish produced and exported salt.

Abu Arish is the capital and center of the Abu Arish Governorate in southwestern Saudi Arabia. It is situated to the east of the city of Jizan at the intersection of longitude 42.30 and latitude 16.30. The city of Abu Arish has been known since ancient times under the name Darb al-Naja. In the early seventh century AH, it served as the capital of Al-Mekhlaf Al-Sulaymani.

== History ==
Abu Arish is one of the historical cities known since the fourth century AH, as it is located on the pilgrims' route, and its origins and history can be recognized from the study of Al-Mekhlaf Al-Sulaymani by historian and writer Muhammad ibn Ahmad al-Aqili. He stated that the area was initially inhabited by the Al-Hakami and Al-Jibril families and that it had been in existence for a much longer period of time, previously known as "Darb al-Naja." The city is of strategic location due to its role as a transportation hub, connecting numerous governorates via a network of regional roads. It is situated at a pivotal point between Ahad al Masarihah Governorate in the south, Damad Governorate in the north, Al Aridhah Governorate in the east, and Jazan Emirate in the west.

== Etymology ==
Abu Arish was previously known as Darb al-Naja. The name Abu Arish was derived from a man who came for pilgrimage and passed through the village of Abu Arish at that time. Upon his return, he again passed through the village. He built a pergola (Arish in Arabic) made of wood and straw to educate the village's sons in the sciences of religion and jurisprudence. When visiting this jurist, one might say, "I am going to Abu Arish," meaning the owner of the arish which is how the village got its name.

== Neighborhoods of Abu Arish ==
- King Fahd
- Al-Khalidiya
- Al-Andalus
- Al-Naseem
- Al-Rawda
- Al-Salam
- Al-Quds
- Al-Nahda
- Al-Safa
- Al-Ward
- Al-Zuhur
- Al-Nuzha
- Qanborah
- Al-Rabea
- Al-Bahakla

== Popular mosques ==
Abu Arish is home to numerous mosques, the most notable of which are

- Al-Qebab Mosque.
- Al-Hokair Mosque.
- Al-Qaraawi Mosque.
- Al Taqwa Mosque.
- Mirabi Mosque.
- Rifaiya Mosque.

== Climate ==
The climate of Abu Arish is similar to that of the southwestern region of the Kingdom, as it is situated within this area. The climate is characterized by mild winters, with temperatures reaching 18 degrees Celsius, and a hot, humid summer, with temperatures reaching 35 degrees Celsius. During the summer, monsoon winds and sandstorms are common, particularly in the afternoon and evening, and are called by the locals (Ghubra). On some days, the intensity of the winds increases, resulting in decreased visibility for several hours. This can lead to the formation of sand dunes, as well as irregular local winds that blow with great force for brief periods. These winds are characterized by high temperatures, low humidity, and the presence of sand and dust clouds.

== Economy ==
The city of Abu Arish is distinguished by its geographical positioning, situated at the nexus of the region's principal urban centers. The local population is predominantly engaged in agricultural and commercial activities, with the city market serving as a pivotal economic hub within the region. The weekly market day occurs on Wednesdays, during which traders engage in commercial activities involving both regional and external markets. These activities encompass the import and export of various products. Each profession had its own market, with a sheikh responsible for the affairs of its affiliates. As the region developed, traditional trade methods underwent a transformation, with the advent of new professions and the decline of older ones. Many individuals sought employment with the government or pursued non-manual self-employment, while commercial complexes and integrated markets emerged.

== See also ==
- Principality of Abu 'Arish
- List of cities and towns in Saudi Arabia
- Regions of Saudi Arabia
