= Al-Tuwal governorate =

Governorate in Jazan Province, Saudi Arabia

At-Tuwal Governorate محافظة الطوال
- Category B governorate
- Location within Jazan Province

- Location of At Tuwal in Saudi Arabia
- Coordinates (At Tuwal): 16°31′46″N 42°58′03″E
- Country: Saudi Arabia
- Province: Jazan Province
- Upgrade announced: April 2012
- Seat: At Tuwal

Population (2022 census)
  - Total: 36,259
- Time zone: UTC+3 (SAST)

At-Tuwal Governorate (Arabic: محافظة الطوال, romanized: Muḥāfaẓat aṭ-Ṭuwāl), also written Al-Tuwal Governorate, is a Category B governorate in Jazan Province, southwestern Saudi Arabia. Its administrative seat is At-Tuwal. The governorate lies on the Saudi Arabia–Yemen border, about 75 kilometres (47 mi) southeast of Jazan city. It includes the At-Tuwal border crossing and the southern starting point of Route 5. The 2022 census recorded a population of 36,259.

== Administration ==
At-Tuwal was previously an administrative center associated with Samtah. In April 2012, Jazan's deputy emir announced that a royal directive would upgrade At-Tuwal, Fayfa and Harub from administrative centers to Category B governorates. The upgrades were to be phased in over three financial years beginning with the 1433–1434 AH financial year.

The governorate has one subordinate administrative center, Al-Muwassam (الموسم). Its local council reviews the municipal budget and development projects; a January 2019 meeting included the governor, the head of Al-Muwassam and representatives of government departments.

== Geography ==
At-Tuwal occupies the southern part of Jazan Province. Samtah borders it to the north, east and west, while Yemen lies to the south.

Wadi Tashar is part of the governorate's agricultural landscape and is listed among the principal valleys that support farming in Jazan. A botanical survey published in 2018 recorded 89 plant species from 68 genera and 27 families in the wadi, with the greatest species richness in the wadi bed. Heavy rain can also bring sudden flooding. In September 2014, floodwater from Wadi Tashar surrounded the village of Wa'lan and entered houses, prompting evacuations.

== Demographics ==
The 2022 census recorded 36,259 residents in the governorate. Saudipedia reports that this was approximately 2.6 percent of Jazan Province's population, making At-Tuwal one of the province's least-populated governorates.

== Transport and border crossing ==
Route 5 begins within the governorate at the Saudi–Yemeni border and runs north to Saudi Arabia's border with Jordan. Saudipedia identifies it as the governorate's main land transport route. The nearest airport is King Abdullah International Airport in Jazan, approximately 76 kilometres (47 mi) away.

In October 2013, the Saudi Press Agency reported that hundreds of Yemeni Hajj pilgrims were arriving daily through the At-Tuwal border crossing. Its report described passport, customs and health-screening services for pilgrims entering Saudi Arabia.

== Public services ==
In September 2020, Jazan's water administration began pumping desalinated water to seven villages in the governorate. The project was intended to serve more than 13,000 people and included 52 kilometres (32 mi) of pipelines and 1,924 household connections.

At-Tuwal General Hospital reported more than 70,000 beneficiaries across its departments in the first half of 2023, including emergency, outpatient and inpatient care.
