= Mount Tharaan =

Mountain in Jazan region, Saudi Arabia

Tharaan
- Location within Saudi Arabia

Highest point
- Elevation: 2,621 m (8,599 ft)
- Listing: Mountains of Saudi Arabia

Naming
- Native name: ثهران (Arabic)

Geography
- Location: Al Dayer, Jazan, Saudi Arabia
- Parent range: Sarawat Mountains

Mount Tharaan (Arabic: جبل ظهران) is part of Sarawat Mountains located south of Saudi Arabia, Specifically in the north east of Al Dayer governance in Jizan Region, It has an elevation of 2,261 metres (7,418 ft).

== See also ==
- Hijaz Mountains
