= Rownah =

Village in Saudi Arabia

Coordinates: 16°32′28″N 42°48′27″E

Rownah is a village in the Emirate of Jizan, Saudi Arabia. It has many basic services, such as schools, paved roads, and water. The population is about 800, mostly from the Almejreba tribe, with a minority from other tribes.

Rownah has a distinctive and attractive location on the main road between Alshi and Samtah. It is located behind the Valley Ta 'sher deltas, which abound with agriculture, and feature golden dunes.
