= Harub Governorate =

Governorate in Jazan Region, Saudi Arabia

Harub Governorate محافظة هروب
- Governorate
- Location of Harub in Jazan Region
- Interactive map – OSM boundary of Harub (12430377)
- Location within Saudi Arabia
- Coordinates: 17°26′07.4″N 42°54′17.7″E
- Country: Saudi Arabia
- Region: Jazan Region
- Capital: Harub
- Elevation: 980 m (3,220 ft)
- Highest elevation: 2,350 m (7,710 ft)

Population (2022 census)
  - Total: 30,709
- Postal Code: 85872
- GeoNames: 106043
- Geocode: CWP3+5X2

Harub Governorate (Arabic: محافظة هروب) is a governorate in Jazan Region, Saudi Arabia, located at 17.435395, 42.904905 (Plus Code CWP3+5X2), approximately 100 km (62 mi) northeast of Jazan city.

== Geography ==
Harub is located in the highlands of Jazan Region. The governorate capital lies at an average elevation of 980 metres (3,220 ft), while Jabal Al-Shadid, the highest peak, reaches 2,350 metres (7,710 ft).

== Administrative divisions ==
Harub Governorate comprises 6 centers (marakiz) and more than 87 villages.

Centers of Harub Governorate
Center	Arabic	Notes
Manjid	منجد	
Razan	رزان	
Hijin	حجن	
Al Juwain	الجوين	Al-Dohain Waterfall Park
Wasa'	وساع	
Al-Awdiyah	الأودية	

== Mountains ==
- Jabal Al-Shadid – 2,350 m
- Jabal Adahi
- Jabal Al-Bazekh
- Jabal Al-Faqara

== Tourism ==
- Al-Dohain Waterfall Park – located in Al Juwain center
- Al-Barari Tourist Park – 6,018,247 sqm
- Agricultural terraces
- Wadi Al-Juwain
- Sunday Market (Souq Al-Ahad)

== Map ==
Harub Governorate – CWP3+5X2
