= Al Juwain =

Administrative center in Jazan, Saudi Arabia

Al Juwain الجوين
- Administrative center (Category B)
- Location in Saudi Arabia
- Coordinates: 17.53756°N 42.85038°E
- Country: Saudi Arabia
- Region: Jazan Region
- Governorate: Harub Governorate
- Code: 2387
- Elevation: 1,200 m (3,900 ft)

Population (2022)
  - Total: 3,000
- Time zone: UTC+3 (AST)
- Postal code: 87631
- Area code: 017
- Geonames ID: 13157454
- Wikidata: Q20394549

Al Juwain (Arabic: الجوين), also known as Al-Juwain Center (Arabic: مركز الجوين), is a Saudi administrative center classified as Category B. It is part of Harub Governorate in Jazan Region, southwestern Saudi Arabia. The center's unified code is 2387.

== Geography ==
Al Juwain is located in the Harub Mountains at about 1,200 meters elevation. It is situated near Jabal Al-Aswad (Black Mountain), Wadi Rizan, and As Sahalil villages. The area includes valleys such as Wadi Al-Juwain and is known for its agricultural terraces and moderate climate. Notable landmarks include Al-Dohain Waterfall Park and Jamea Markaz Al-Juwain Mosque.

== Administration ==
The center is administered by Harub Governorate. The Governor of Harub regularly holds local council sessions in Al Juwain to discuss service needs and municipal projects. The center is supervised by a chief appointed by the Emir of Jazan.

== Development Projects ==
The Governor of Harub has inspected several development and municipal projects in Al Juwain Center, as part of ongoing efforts to improve services in mountainous centers of Jazan.

== Population ==
According to estimates based on the General Authority for Statistics census data for Jazan Region centers, the population of Al Juwain is around 3,000 inhabitants.
