= Suq al layl =

Suq al layl may refer to several places in Saudi Arabia:

- Suq al layl, Jizan
- Suq Al Lail -Mecca
