= Al Badi' =

Al Badī‘
- Village
- Location in Saudi Arabia
- Coordinates: 16°59′35″N 42°46′23″E
- Country: Saudi Arabia
- Province: Jizan Province
- Time zone: UTC+3 (EAT)
  - Summer (DST): UTC+3 (EAT)

Al Badī‘ is a village in Jizan Province, in south-western Saudi Arabia.

== See also ==
- List of cities and towns in Saudi Arabia
- Regions of Saudi Arabia
