= Al Hanashah =

- Village
- Location in Saudi Arabia
- Coordinates: 16°33′29″N 42°45′55″E
- Country: Saudi Arabia
- Province: Jizan Province
- Time zone: UTC+3 (EAT)
  - Summer (DST): UTC+3 (EAT)

Al Hanashah is a village in Jizan Province, in south-western Saudi Arabia.

== محمد ==
- List of cities and towns in Saudi Arabia
- Regions of Saudi Arabia
- الهناشه تغير اسمها الجروب و موقعها غلط
