= Al-Mubarakah =

Al-Mubarakah ‘Anţūţah Antota
- Village
- Location in Saudi Arabia
- Coordinates: 16°32′1.60″N 42°56′36″E
- Country: Saudi Arabia
- Province: Jizan Province
- Time zone: UTC+3 (AST)
  - Summer (DST): UTC+3 (AST)

Al-Mubarakah (also called ‘Anţūţah or Antota) is a village in Jizan Province, in south-western Saudi Arabia.

== See also ==
- List of cities and towns in Saudi Arabia
- Regions of Saudi Arabia
