= Al-ʽUlayin =

- Village
- Location in Saudi Arabia
- Coordinates: 17°9′0″N 43°10′15″E
- Country: Saudi Arabia
- Province: Jizan Province
- Time zone: UTC+3 (EAT)
  - Summer (DST): UTC+3 (EAT)

Al-ʽUlayin is a village in Jizan Province, in south-western Saudi Arabia.

== See also ==
- List of cities and towns in Saudi Arabia
- Regions of Saudi Arabia
