= Ottoman Arabia =

Ottoman rule in Arabia (1517–1918)

Ottoman Arabia الدولة العثمانية في شبه الجزيرة العربية (Arabic)
- 1517–1918
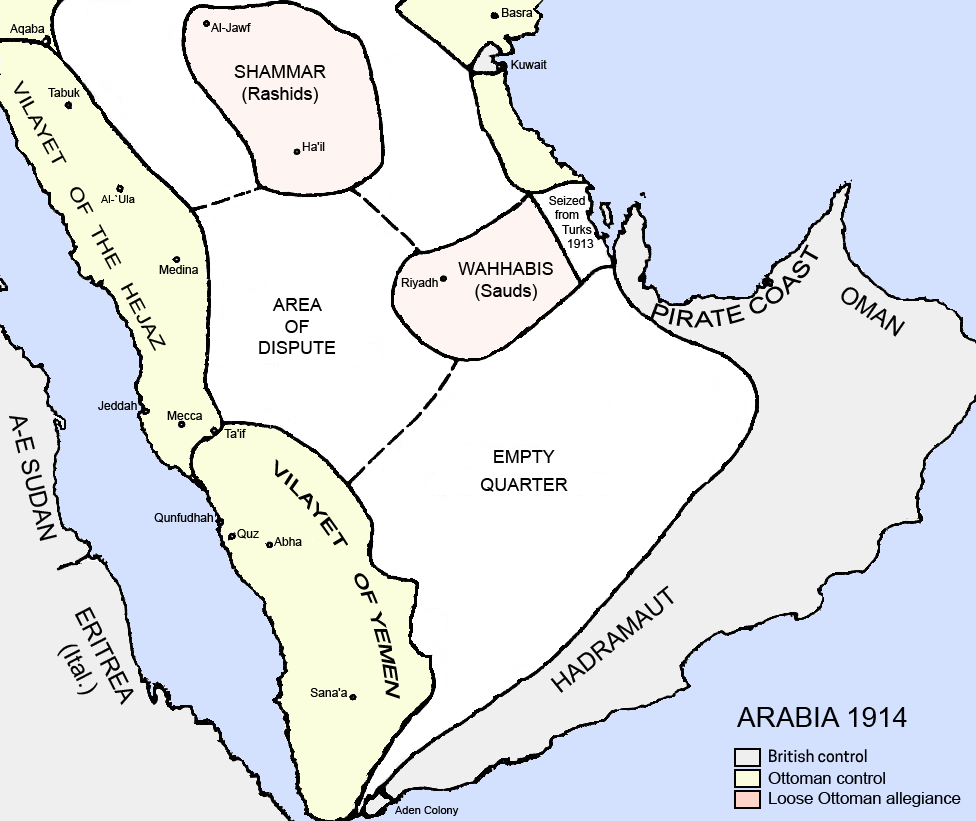

- Common languages: Arabic
- Religion: Islam; Judaism; Christianity
- Demonym: Arab

Government
- Beylerbey, Pasha, Agha, Dey
- History
  - Ottoman–Mamluk War (1516–1517): 1517
  - Arab Revolt: 1918
- Today part of: Saudi Arabia, Yemen, Oman.

The Ottoman era in the history of Arabia lasted from 1517 to 1918. The Ottoman degree of control over these lands varied over these four centuries, with the fluctuating strength or weakness of the Empire's central authority.

== History ==
=== Early period ===
In the 16th century, the Ottomans added the Red Sea and Persian Gulf coast (the Hejaz, Asir and al-Hasa) to the Empire and claimed suzerainty over the interior, the whole Arabian peninsula came under nominal suzerainty of the sultan in Constantinople. The main reason was to thwart Portuguese attempts to attack the Red Sea (hence the Hejaz) and the Indian Ocean. As early as 1578, the Sharifs of Mecca launched forays into the desert to conquer and punish the Najdi tribes who mounted raids on oases and tribes in the Hejaz. and again three years later(1581) During the seventeenth century, the Sharifs invaded Najd five times in these years (1606, 1647, 1669, 1676, 1697).

The emergence of what was to become the Saudi royal family, known as the Al Saud, began in Nejd in central Arabia in 1744, when Muhammad bin Saud, founder of the dynasty, joined forces with the religious leader Muhammad ibn Abd al-Wahhab who was from the Hanbali school of thought. This alliance formed in the 18th century provided the ideological impetus to Saudi expansion and remains the basis of Saudi Arabian dynastic rule today.

On the 10th of Muharram, 961 AH (Sunday, December 13, 1553 CE), the Ottomans, through their Emir in Al-Ahsa, Muhammad Emir (Bey), appointed Sa'dun ibn Hamid (Sanjak Bey) as Emir over some of the lands of Al-Aridh and Najd, such as Al-Uyaynah, Ma'kal, Manfuhah, Huraymila, Al-Qasab and some surrounding areas by the ottomans. in this year 961 AH (1553 CE) the Ottoman orders were issued to the Sharifs to place the Najd region among the territories under their protection. Perhaps the attacks by some tribes on the Hajj caravans were among the reasons that prompted the Sharif to raise complaints

=== Hajj in the 16th and 17th centuries ===
At the beginning of the 16th century When the Ottomans conquered Mamluk territory in 1517, the whole peninsula came under the influence of Selim I Sultan. the ottomans continued to claim the rights of sovereignty over the entire peninsula, even in the 17th century, the Ottomans would continue their claim on the entire Arabian peninsula as if it were their own territory, even when it was ruled by local rulers and tribal loyalists. the role of the Ottoman sultan in the Hijaz was first and foremost to take care of the Holy Cities of Mecca and Medina and provide safe passage for the many Muslims from various regions who traveled to Mecca to perform the Hajj. The Sultan was sometimes referred to as "Servant of the Holy Places" but since the Ottoman rulers could not claim lineage from the Islamic Prophet Muhammad, it was important to maintain an image of power and piety through construction projects, financial support and caretaking.

In 1578 the Sharifs of Mecca launched an invasion into the desert, involving 50,000 warriors, to conquer and punish the Najdi tribes. The troops reached Riyadh, which they sacked. After appointing a new ruler and imprisoning several influential citizens, the sharif's forces returned to Mecca. The prisoners were released after a year in exchange for an agreement to pay an annual tribute. Such actions were repeated every few years, where the Sharif would launch invasions into Najd and appoint a ruler. In 1697 a large raid was led into Najd in the name of Sharif Sad, where they captured over 100 influential Anaza leaders. Several raids against the Bedouins were also conducted. The last large-scale campaign on Najd, launched by the sharif's forces under Ottoman-backing, occurred in 1726–27.

There is no record of a ruling Sultan visiting Mecca during the Hajj, but according to primary records, Ottoman princes and princesses were sent to make the pilgrimage or visit the Holy Cities during the year. The distance from the center of the empire in Istanbul, as well as the length and danger of the journey, was likely the main factor that prevented Sultans from traveling to the Hijaz.

Regional administration of Mecca and Medina was left in the hands of the Sharifs, or the stewards of Mecca since the Abbasid caliphate. The Sharifs maintained a level of local autonomy under the rule of the Sultan. To balance the local influences, the Sultan appointed the kadis and lesser officials in the region. At first, being appointed the kadi in the region was considered a low position, but as religion grew more important within the culture of the Ottoman Empire, the role of the kadis in the Mecca and Medina grew in prominence.

Aside from customs collected in Jeddah, the inhabitants of the Hijaz did not pay taxes to the empire and the finances of the city were taken care of through various waqf properties across the rest of the empire, dedicated to support the people of Mecca and Medina as an act of charity with religious significance because of the holy status of the two cities.

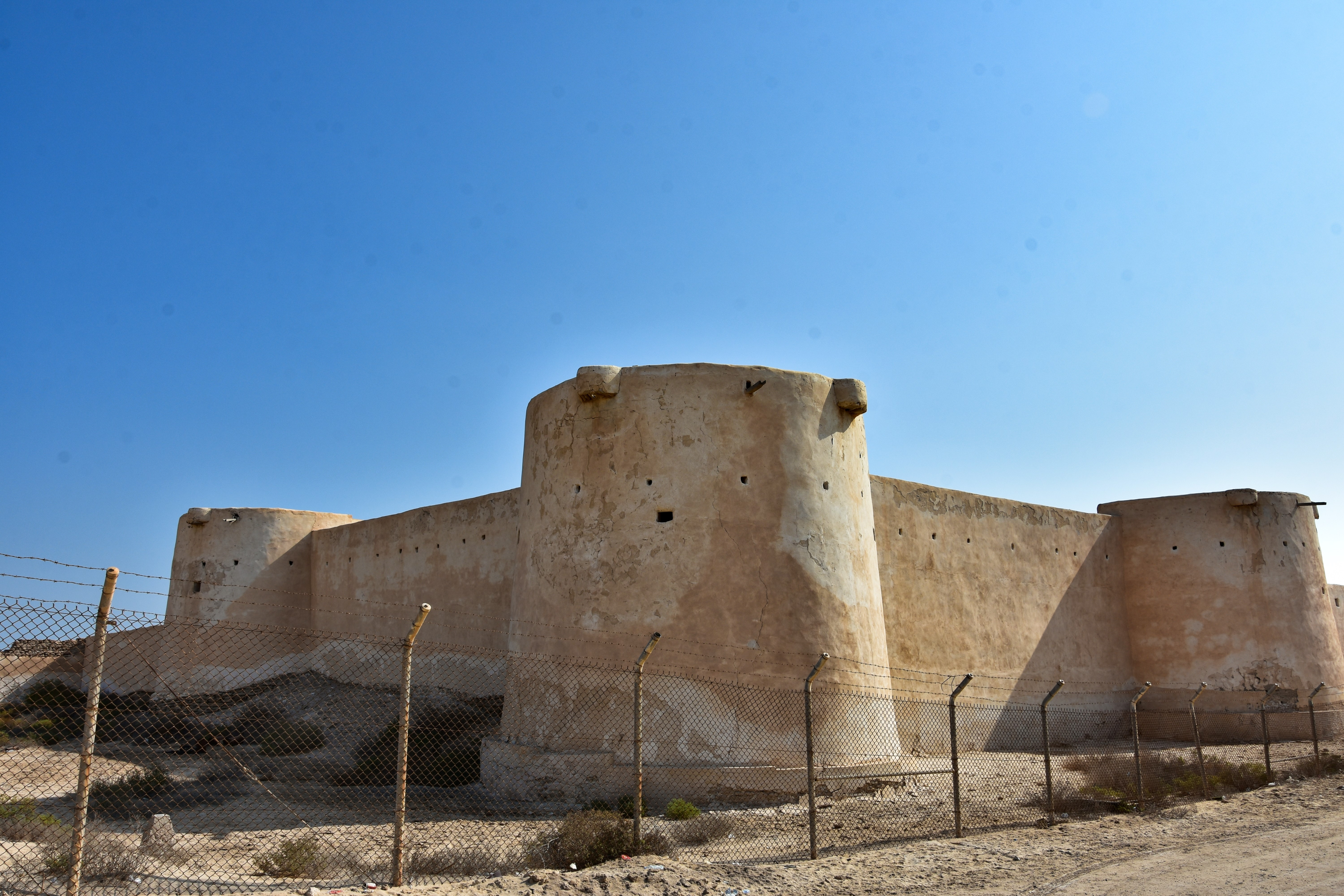
An Ottoman fort in Uqair, Arabia

The central Ottoman government controlled caravan routes to Mecca and was obligated to protect pilgrims along these routes. This included providing supplies such as food and water for the journey. This included providing subsidies to the desert Bedouin tribes whose limited resources were used by pilgrims along the major routes from Damascus and Cairo respectively. The Ottoman Empire, as custodian of Mecca and Medina, was supposed to provide safe passage for all pilgrims traveling to the Holy Cities. However, political alliances and conflicts shaped the routes that were opened or closed.

Particularly in the case of the Safavid Empire, the Ottomans closed the shortest route from Basra, in present-day Iraq, that would have allowed Shi’i pilgrims to cross the Persian Gulf into the Arabian Peninsula. Pilgrims were instead required to use the official caravan routes from Damascus, Cairo or Yemen.

The Ottomans got expelled and was forced to withdraw from Al-Hasa in 1680. The Ottomans still claimed Al-hasa as part of the empire, even tho they held no suzerain over the Emirate.

From the Mughal Empire, sea routes were blocked by the presence of Portuguese ships in the Indian Ocean. From Central Asia, wars between the Uzbeks and Safavids led to complications in caravan routes. Most Central Asian pilgrims went through Istanbul or Delhi to join a pilgrimage caravan. Trade routes often flourished along pilgrimage routes, since the existing infrastructure and protections were established, and traveling pilgrims increased the demand for products.

Construction, repairs, and addition to religious sites in Mecca and Medina were costly, due to the location of the cities and the need for imported materials, but it was a symbol of the power and generosity of the Sultan. Repairs that had to be made to the Kaaba after a flood in 1630 were contentious because of the religious significance of the building itself. These repairs were generally aimed at preserving the structural integrity of the site. Yet, the opinion of local religious scholars on the extent of the repairs meant that the project became politicized because Ridhwan Agha, who was in charge of overseeing the repairs, was a representative of the Sultan as opposed to an elite from the Hijaz.

Other projects included building, repairing, and maintaining water pipes that served pilgrims, and establishing soup kitchens, schools, and charitable foundations within the region.

=== Rise of the Saudi state ===
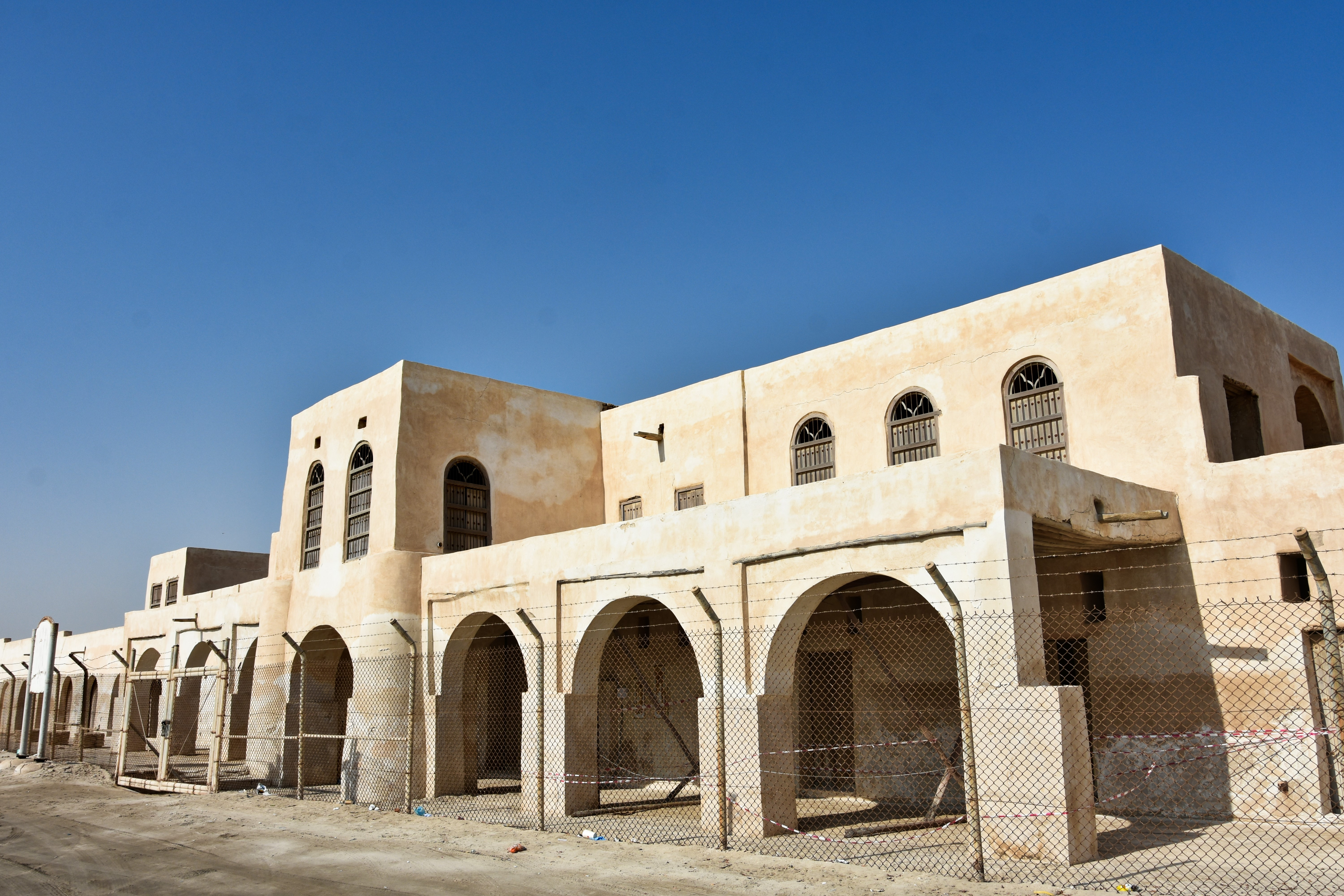
Ottoman khan in Uqair, Arabia

The first Saudi state was established in 1744 in the area around Riyadh, rapidly expanded, and briefly controlled most of the present-day territory of Saudi Arabia. When Muhammad Ibn Abd al-Wahhab abandoned the position of imam in 1773, the spread of Saudi control over the whole southern and central Najd was completed. In the late 1780s, the northern Najd was added to the Saudi emirate. In 1792, Al-Hasa fell to the Saudis. The Saudi emirate gained control of Taif in 1802, and of Medina in 1804.

The first Saudi state was destroyed by 1818 by the Ottoman viceroy of Egypt, Mohammed Ali Pasha. A much smaller second "Saudi state", located mainly in Nejd, was established in 1824. Throughout the rest of the 19th century, the Al Saud contested control of the interior of what was to become Saudi Arabia with another Arabian ruling family, the Al Rashid. By 1891, the Al Rashid were victorious and the Al Saud were driven into exile in Kuwait.

In the early 20th century, the Ottoman Empire maintained control or nominal authority over most of the Arabian Peninsula. Despite this suzerainty, Arabia was governed by a diverse array of tribal leaders, with the Sharif of Mecca holding sway over the Hejaz region.

In 1902, Ibn Saud seized control of Riyadh in Nejd, reestablishing the dominance of the Al Saud family in the region. He garnered support from the Ikhwan, a tribal army inspired by Muhammad ibn Abd al-Wahhab and led by Sultan ibn Bijad and Faisal Al-Dawish. Established in 1912, the Ikhwan played a pivotal role in Ibn Saud's campaigns, helping him capture al-Hasa from the Ottomans in 1913.

In 1916, backed by British encouragement and support (as Britain was engaged in World War I against the Ottomans), the Sharif of Mecca, Hussein bin Ali, initiated a pan-Arab revolt against Ottoman rule, aiming to establish a unified Arab state. The Allied victory in World War I marked the end of Ottoman suzerainty and control in Arabia.

== Territorial divisions ==
During the era of Ottoman rule, the territory of modern Saudi Arabia was divided between the following entities:

- Ottoman provinces and emirates:
  - Sharifate of Mecca (968–1916; Ottoman control 1517–1803; 1841–1916)
  - Egypt Eyalet (1517–1701; 1813–40)
  - Jeddah Eyalet (1701–1813; 1840–1872)
  - Hejaz vilayet (1872–1918)
  - Lahsa Eyalet (1560–1630)
  - Najd Sanjak (1871–1918) (part of al-Hasa oasis rather than Najd)
  - Yemen Eyalet (1517–1636; 1849–1872)
  - Yemen vilayet (1872–1918)
- Saudi states:
  - First Saudi State (1744–1818)
  - Second Saudi State (1818–1891)
  - Emirate of Nejd and Hasa (1902–1921; became modern Saudi Arabia)
- Other states and entities:
  - Emirate of Jabal Shammar (1836–1921)
  - Idrisid Emirate of Asir (1906–1934)
