= Jizan Dam =

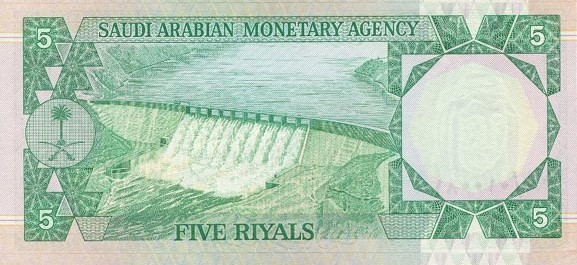

- Location within Saudi Arabia
- Country: Saudi Arabia
- Location: Abu `Arish, Jizan Province
- Coordinates: 17°02′57″N 42°57′27″E
- Purpose: Irrigation, flood control
- Status: Operational
- Opening date: 1970; 56 years ago
- Construction cost: US$11 million
- Owners: Ministry of Water and Electricity

Dam and spillways
- Type of dam: Gravity
- Impounds: Wadi Jizan
- Height: 35 m (115 ft)
- Length: 316 m (1,037 ft)

Reservoir
- Creates: Jizan Reservoir
- Total capacity: 51,000,000 m^{3} (41,000 acre⋅ft)

The Jizan Dam, also spelled Jazan, is a gravity dam on Wadi Jizan about 16 km (9.9 mi) northeast of Abu `Arish in Jizan Province of southwest Saudi Arabia. It has several purpose to include irrigation and flood control. Located in a desert, the dam collects run-off and stores it for periodic releases downstream. Water released from the dam is distributed by two diversion dams downstream for the irrigation of 8,000 ha (20,000 acres) of land. Crops grown include sorghum with eucalyptus and tamarisk grown for anti-desertification. The dam was completed in 1970 and is owned by the Ministry of Water and Electricity.

== See also ==
- List of dams in Saudi Arabia
