= As Sirr =

As Sirr may refer to:

- As Sirr, Saudi Arabia
- As Sirr, Yemen
