= Al-ʽUsaylah =

- residential area
- Location in Abu 'Arish Saudi Arabia
- Coordinates: 16°55′13″N 42°44′7″E
- Country: Saudi Arabia
- Province: Jizan Province
- Time zone: UTC+3 (EAT)
  - Summer (DST): UTC+3 (EAT)

Al-ʽUsaylah (العسيلة) is a residential area in Jizan Province, in south-western Saudi Arabia.

== See also ==
- List of cities and towns in Saudi Arabia
- Regions of Saudi Arabia
