= Rahwan, Raebareli =

Rahwan Rahwān
- Village
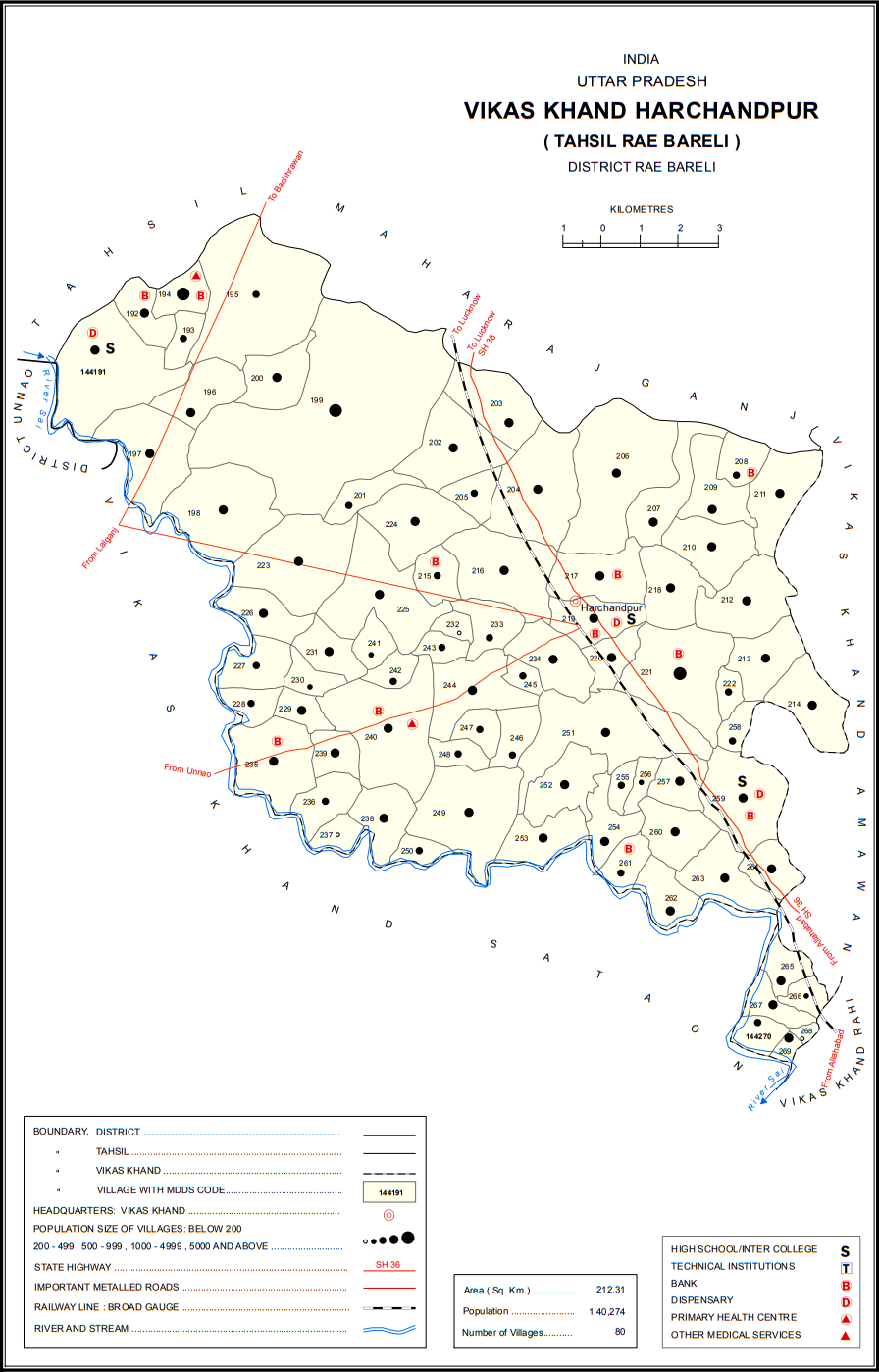
- Map showing Rahwan (#240) in Harchandpur CD block

- Location in Uttar Pradesh, India
- Coordinates: 26.313185°N 81.11407°E
- Country India: India
- State: Uttar Pradesh
- District: Raebareli

Area
  - Total: 5.883 km^{2} (2.271 sq mi)

Population (2011)
  - Total: 4,292
  - Density: 729.6/km^{2} (1,890/sq mi)

Languages
  - Official: Hindi
- Time zone: UTC+5:30 (IST)
- PIN: 229308
- Vehicle registration: UP-35

Rahwan is a village in Harchandpur block of Rae Bareli district, Uttar Pradesh, India. As of 2011, its population was 4,292, in 802 households. It has 3 primary schools and one medical clinic.

The 1961 census recorded Rahwan as comprising 10 hamlets, with a total population of 1,865 people (970 male and 895 female), in 381 households and 346 physical houses. The area of the village was given as 1,453 acres and it had a post office at that point.

The 1981 census recorded Rahwan as having a population of 2,518 people, in 419 households, and having an area of 588.03 hectares.
