= Khumsiyah =

- Village
- Location in Saudi Arabia
- Coordinates: 16°46′17″N 42°48′7″E
- Country: Saudi Arabia
- Province: Jizan Province
- Time zone: UTC+3 (EAT)
  - Summer (DST): UTC+3 (EAT)

Khumsiyah is a village in Jizan Province, in south-western Saudi Arabia.
