= CSCL Long Beach =

Container ship built in 2007

History
- Name: CSCL Long Beach
- Owner: Seaspan Corp
- Operator: China Shipping Container Lines
- Port of registry: Hong Kong Hong Kong
- Builder: Samsung Heavy Industries
- Yard number: 1568
- Launched: 28 April 2007
- Completed: 7 May 2007
- Identification: IMO number: 9314258; MMSI number: 477883900; Callsign: VRCZ7
- Status: In service

General characteristics
- Tonnage: 111,700 DWT
- Length: 337 m (1,106 ft)
- Beam: 46 m (151 ft)
- Height: 62 m (203 ft)
- Draught: 15 m (49 ft)
- Depth: 27.2 m
- Speed: 20.1 / 17.6 knots
- Capacity: 9,572 TEU
- Crew: 17

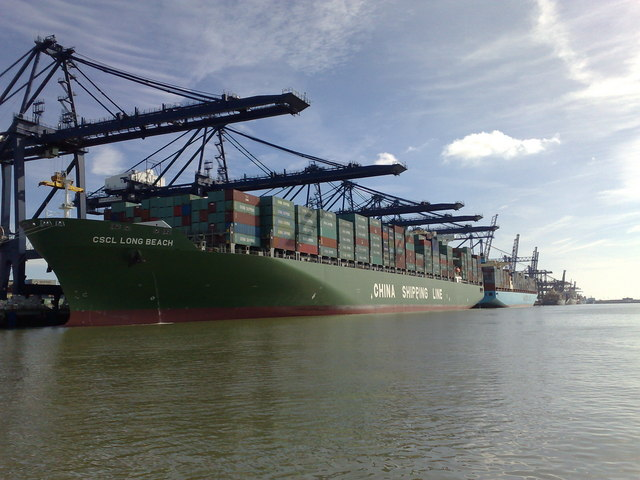
CSSL Long Beach at Felixstowe

CSCL Long Beach was built by Samsung Heavy Industries of Korea and was delivered to Seaspan Ship Management on July 5, 2007, approximately eight weeks ahead of its contractual delivery date. The CSCL Long Beach is chartered to China Shipping Container Lines.

== Hull and engine ==
The CSCL Long Beach was built in 2007 by Samsung Heavy Industries, Korea. The CSCL Long Beach is 336 metres long, and 46 metres across the beam. This container vessel has a deadweight tonnage of 111,700. The vessel has a TEU capacity of 9,580 and is propelled by a 93,120 BHP MAN B&W engine, which gives the vessel a maximum speed of 20.1 kts. Its sister ship is the CSCL Zeebrugge.

== Events onboard ==
On 3 Dec, 2010, while en route from Valencia, Spain to Klang, Malaysia, a Sri Lankan mariner had to be rescued after badly injuring his hand aboard the CSCL Long Beach. The sailor was rescued by Saudi Arabian border guards in the Red Sea and taken to Jizan Province of Saudi Arabia.

== Ship owner ==
CSCL Long Beach is owned by the Seaspan Corporation, which charters out container ships that run all over the world. Its charters usually go on to be long-term charters.
