= Jazan City for Primary and Downstream Industries =

Coordinates: 17°17′40″N 42°23′40″E

Jazan City for Primary and Downstream Industries مدينة جازان للصناعات الأولية و التحويلية
- Interactive map of Jazan City for Primary and Downstream Industries مدينة جازان للصناعات الأولية و التحويلية
- Province: Jazan Province
- Named for: Jazan

Government
  - Body: Royal Commission for Jubail and Yanbu. (Note: Since 2015)

Population (Projected)
  - Total: 300,000
- Time zone: UTC+03:00 (SAST)

Jazan City for Primary and Downstream Industries, (formerly Jazan Economic City) is a planned industrial city in the Jazan Province of the Saudi Arabia, with a focus on the energy and manufacturing industries. The primary developers involved in the construction of the city are MMC Corporation and Saudi Binladin Group.

The Province of Jazan is situated in the southwest part of Saudi Arabia. It has an estimated population of approximately 1,405,000 according to the 2022 Census and covers an area of 11,671 km^{2}, encompassing about 5,000 villages and cities. The city of Jizan hosts the Port of Jazan on the Red Sea.

== See also ==
- King Abdullah bin Abdulaziz
