= CSCL Zeebrugge =

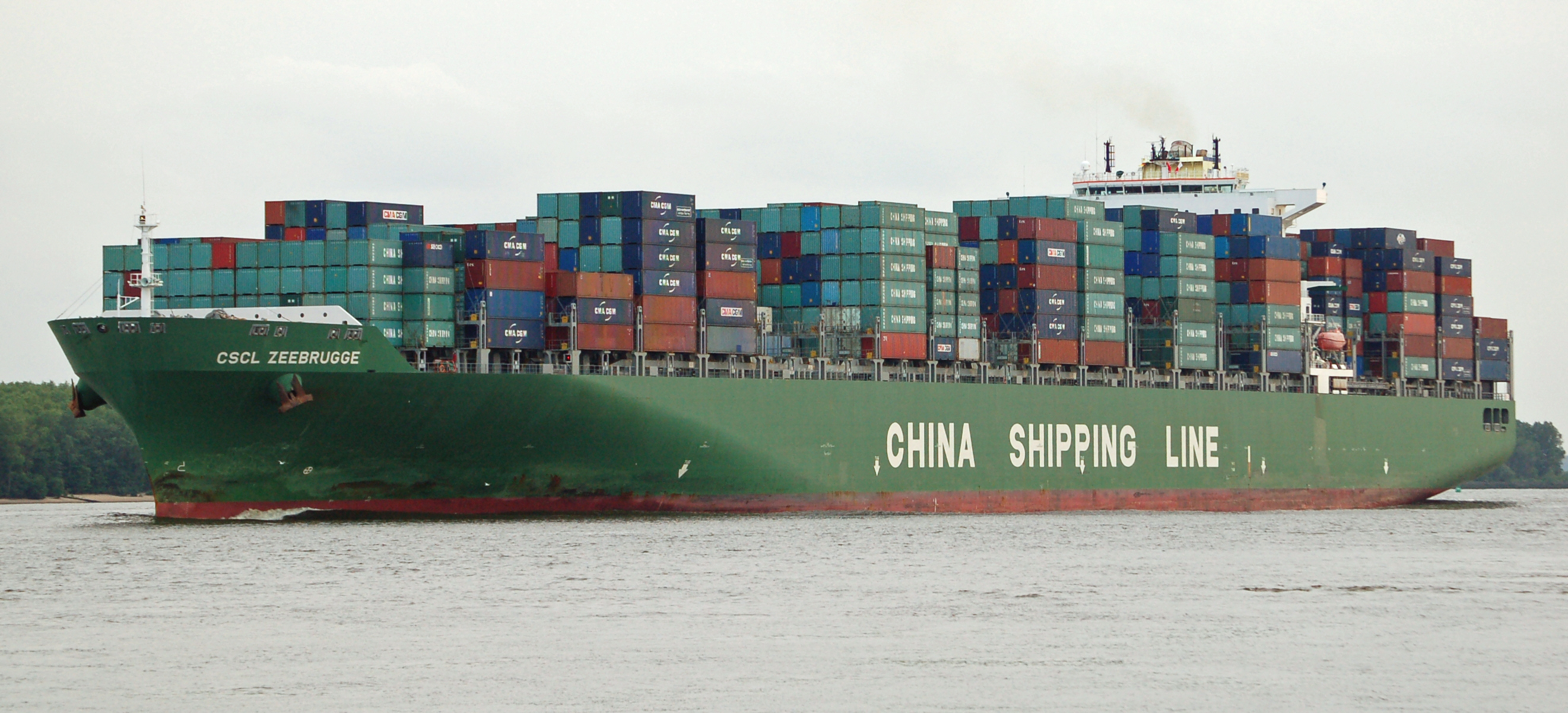
- CSCL Zeebrugge with containers

History
- Name: CSCL Zeebrugge
- Owner: Seaspan Corp
- Operator: Seaspan Ship Management Ltd.
- Port of registry: Hong Kong Hong Kong
- Builder: Samsung Heavy Industries Co. Ltd Geoje
- Yard number: 1566
- Launched: 8 January 2007
- Completed: March 2007
- Identification: IMO number: 9314234; MMSI number: 477690700; Callsign: VRCS2
- Status: In service/Commission

General characteristics
- Class & type: Cellular Container Ship
- Tonnage: 108,069 GT 111,737 DWT
- Length: 336.67 m (1,104.6 ft)
- Beam: 46.0 m (150.9 ft)
- Draught: 13.000 m (42.651 ft)
- Depth: 27.20m
- Installed power: 68,520kW(93,160hp)
- Propulsion: 1 oil engine
- Speed: 24.2kts

CSCL Zeebrugge is a (fully cellular) container ship owned by Seaspan Corp. The ship was constructed by Samsung Heavy Industries at Geoje. Samsung Heavy Industries Co. Ltd Geoje constructed the ship in yard 1566 and completed the CSCL Zeebrugge in March 2007. It is registered out of Hong Kong. Since its completion the CSCL Zeebrugge has been operated by Seaspan Ship Management. Its sister ship is the CSCL Long Beach. It can carry 9,178 boxes and is 336.67m long.

== Hull and engine ==
The ship's gross tonnage is 108,069. The engine aboard the CSCL Zeebrugge is a single oil engine driving 1 FP propeller. This engine is capable of producing a total power of 68,520 kW(93,160 hp). The engine is a 2 stroke 12 cylinder engine. The vessel has a teu capacity of 9,580 and 700 reefers and is propelled by a 93,120 BHP MAN B&W engine, which gives the vessel a maximum speed of 24.7 kts.

MAN-B&W 12K98MC-C engine 2 stroke 12 cylinder 1 FP propeller
