= Samtah Governorate =

Samtah Governorate محافظة صامطة
- Governorate
- Location within Saudi Arabia
- Coordinates: 16.59722°N 42.94389°E
- Country: Saudi Arabia
- Region: Jazan Province
- Time zone: UTC+3 (EAT)
  - Summer (DST): UTC+3 (EAT)

Samtah Governorate (Arabic: صامطة) is one of the governorates in Jazan Province, Saudi Arabia.
