= Suq al layl, Jizan =

Suq al layl
- Village
- Location in Saudi Arabia
- Coordinates: 16°43′03″N 42°59′36″E
- Country: Saudi Arabia
- Province: Jizan Province
- Time zone: UTC+3 (EAT)
  - Summer (DST): UTC+3 (EAT)

Suq al layl is a village in Jizan Province, in southwestern Saudi Arabia.

== See also ==
- List of cities and towns in Saudi Arabia
- Regions of Saudi Arabia
