= Principality of Abu 'Arish =

Former South Arabian state

The Principality of Abu 'Arish was a state in South Arabia. It was formed when the Sharif of Abu 'Arish, Muhammad bin Ahmed bin Khayrat, declared independence from the weakened Imamate of Yemen after being appointed governor of Abu 'Arish in 1730.

== History ==
In 1763, a Danish expedition headed by Carsten Niebuhr found Abu 'Arish in control of Tihama from Al Qunfudhah in the north, to Al Luḩayyah in the south.
