= Damad, Jizan =

Coordinates: 17°06′N 42°47′E

Damad
- Governorate
- Interactive map of Damad
- Country: Saudi Arabia
- Region: Jizan Region
- Time zone: UTC+3 (EAT)
  - Summer (DST): UTC+3 (EAT)

Damad is one of the governorates in Jizan Region, Saudi Arabia.
