= Ar Rayth =

Governorate of Saudi Arabia

Ar Rayth محافظة الريث
- Governorate
- Interactive map of Ar Rayth
- Coordinates: 17°36′09″N 42°51′24″E
- Country: Saudi Arabia
- Region: Jizan Region

Population (2016)
  - Total: 18,961
- Time zone: UTC+3 (EAT)
  - Summer (DST): UTC+3 (EAT)

Ar Rayth (الريث) is one of the governorates in Jizan Region, Saudi Arabia. The governorate houses the tourist site of wadi Lajab.
