= Al Aydabi =

Al Aydabi محافظة العيدابي
- Governorate
- Location in Saudi Arabia
- Coordinates: 17.237°N 42.939°E
- Country: Saudi Arabia
- Region: Jizan Region

Population (2016)
  - Total: 31,735
- Time zone: UTC+3 (EAT)
  - Summer (DST): UTC+3 (EAT)

Al Aydabi (Arabic: العيدابي) is one of the governorates in Jizan Region, Saudi Arabia.
