= Postal codes in Saudi Arabia =

Postal codes used in Saudi Arabia are colloquially known as postcodes.

Unlike other nations in the general region (which use alphanumeric postal codes), the post codes of Saudi Arabia are numerical as adopted by the Saudi Postal Corporation (Saudi Post). Street numbers and house numbers are not allocated in the country generally, causing many difficulties in postal delivery from town to town, from business to home, and so forth. In order to eradicate any sort of confusion and to make the system operate more smoothly, the postal code system was adopted. The general idea of such a system was an evolution of earlier simple postal districts in Europe, Asia, and the US. Most of the early adoptions took place in the decades between the 1940s and the 1970s.

Reading a Saudi postal code from left to right, each sequence of digits represents a narrower geographic area. The first digit represents a large geographic administrative region within Saudi Arabia:

1. Arriyadh Region
2. Makah Region
3. Eastern Province Region
4. Medina and Tabuk
5. Qasim and Haíl
6. Asir, Najran and Bahah collectively
7. Northern Borders and Jawf
8. Jizan

The second and third digits (combined) are the code for the main post office in that region. The last two digits can indicate either an individual post office or a postal zone in that particular city or surroundings.

The postal code may consist of one or two parts. The first part contains 5 digits as described above. The postcode may be further categorized by a hyphen with the addition of 4 more digits for more clarification and preciseness of the Saudi National Address, making a total of 9 digits. For example, the simple and general postal code of Riyadh is 11564, and Turaif is: 75311. A more specific address within Turaif might have the postcode 75311-8538.

In writing addresses in Saudi Arabia, generally the 9 digit postcodes are for home addresses, while businesses and PO Boxes will only have a 5 digit postal code. It appears, however, that this can vary substantially within different areas of the country.
