= Abu Arish Governorate =

Abu Arish Governorate محافظة أبو عريش
- Governorate
- Location within Saudi Arabia
- Coordinates: 16.96889°N 42.83250°E
- Country: Saudi Arabia
- Region: Jazan Province
- Time zone: UTC+3 (EAT)
  - Summer (DST): UTC+3 (EAT)

Abu Arish Governorate (Arabic: أبو عريش) is one of the governorates in Jazan Province, Saudi Arabia.
