= Ahad al Masarihah =

- Village
- Location in Saudi Arabia
- Coordinates: 16°42′35″N 42°57′18″E
- Country: Saudi Arabia
- Province: Jizan Province

Population (2016)
  - Total: 110,710
- Time zone: UTC+3 (EAT)
  - Summer (DST): UTC+3 (EAT)

Ahad al Masarihah is a governorate in Jizan Province, in south-western Saudi Arabia, bordering Yemen

The governorate of Ahad al Msarihah is one of the governorates of the Jizan region, with villages and hamlets. There's a local market known as the Sunday Market with a carpentry area. It has grassland on the banks of the Khlab Valley in the form of a circular belt along Prince Muhammad Bin Nasser Ring Road.

== Archaeological site ==
A notable archaeological site in the governorate is the city of Al-Khasouf. The historian Al-Hamdani mentioned it in his book The Characteristics of the Arabian Peninsula in four places. He said,

The width of the khasuf is a city of hakam, like the width of [the] sadah and its length from the east is one hundred nineteen degrees.

== Population ==
The population of Ahad al Masarhah was noted as 110,710 on a census taken in 2010.

== See also ==
- List of cities and towns in Saudi Arabia
- Regions of Saudi Arabia
