= Al Aridhah =

Al Aridhah محافظة العارضة
- Governorate
- Country: Saudi Arabia
- Region: Jizan Region

Population (2016)
  - Total: 76,705
- Time zone: UTC+3 (EAT)
  - Summer (DST): UTC+3 (EAT)

Al Aridhah (Arabic: العارضة) is one of the governorates in Jizan Region, Saudi Arabia.
