= Al Dayer =

Al Dayer محافظة الدائر
- Governorate
- Location in Saudi Arabia
- Country: Saudi Arabia
- Region: Jizan Region

Population (2016)
  - Total: 58,494
- Time zone: UTC+3 (EAT)
  - Summer (DST): UTC+3 (EAT)

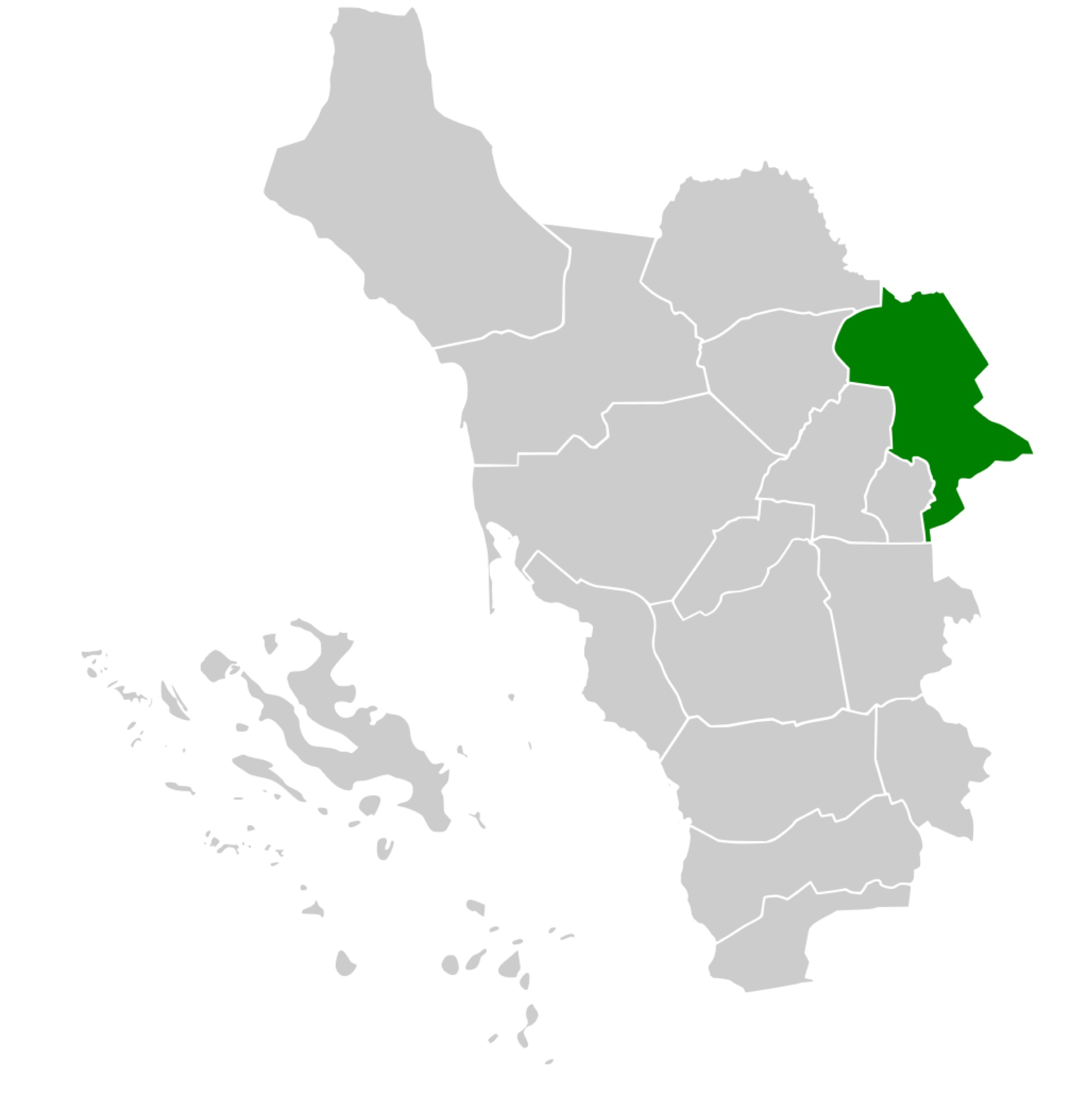

Al Dayer (Arabic: الدائر) is one of the governorates in Jizan Region, Saudi Arabia.

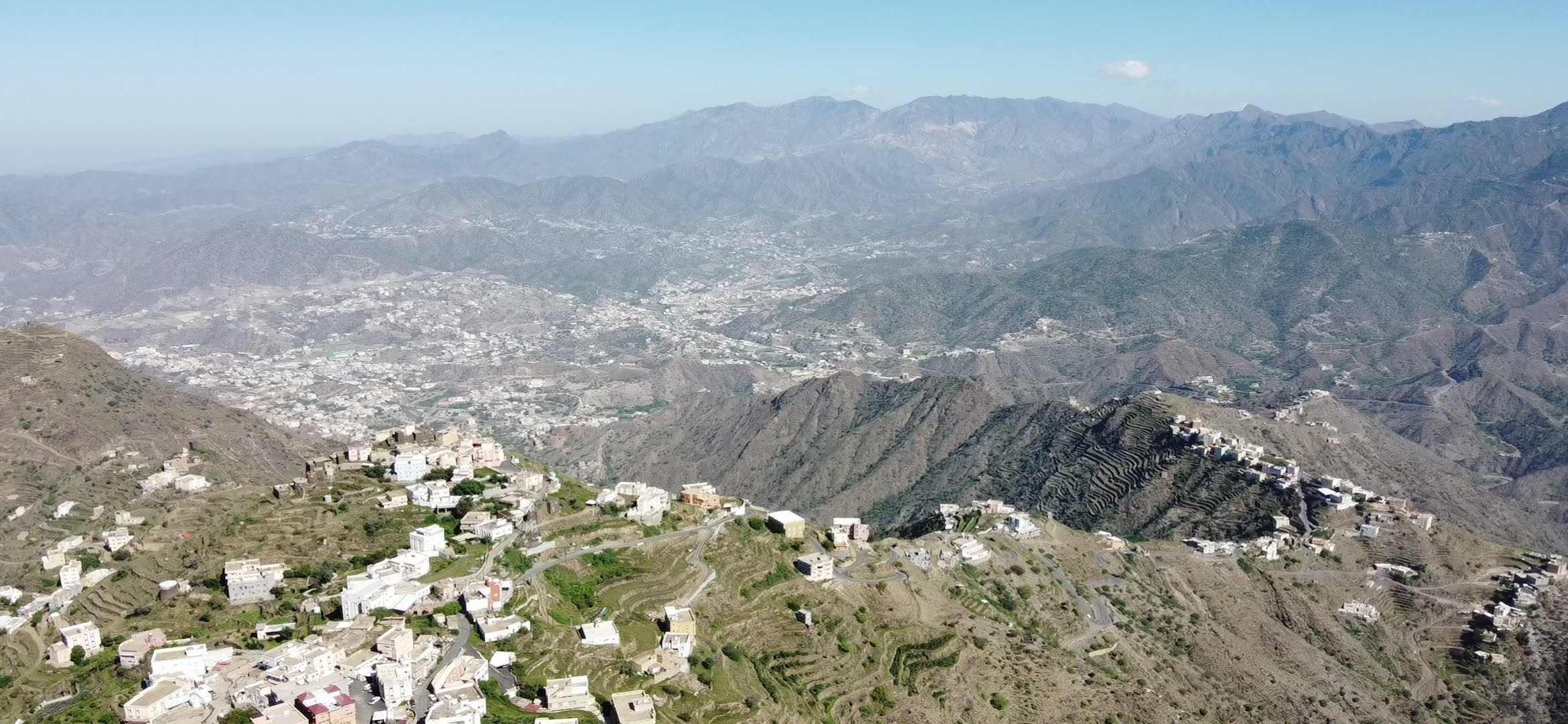

Aldayer's climate is hot in summer and cold in winter. The summer temperature reaches 40 Celsius and in the winter it drops to 10 Celsius in the highlands.
