= Jizan =

Jizan جيزان
- City
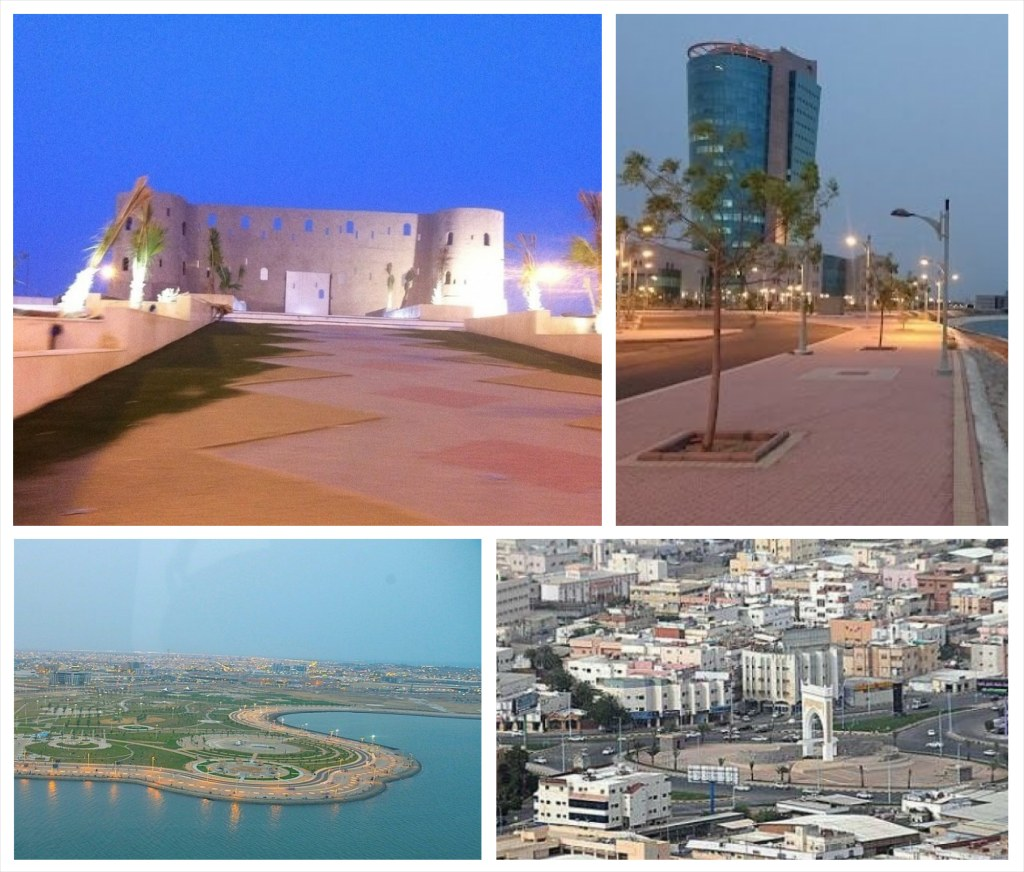

- Location within Saudi Arabia
- Coordinates: 16°53′21″N 42°33′40″E
- Country: Saudi Arabia
- Province: Jazan

Government
  - Governor / Emir: Prince Mohammed bin Abdulaziz bin Mohammed bin Abdulaziz Al Saud
- Elevation: 40 m (130 ft)

Population (2022 census)
  - City: 173,919
  - Metro: 1,404,997 (Jizan region)
- Time zone: UTC+3 (AST)
- Website: www.jazan.gov.sa

Jizan (Arabic: جيزان, romanized: Jīzān) is a city and the capital of Jazan Province, which lies in the southwest corner of Saudi Arabia. Jizan is situated on the coast of the Red Sea and serves a large agricultural heartland that has a population of 173,919 as of 2022 and over 1.4 million, in the whole Jizan region. The city has a regional airport as well as the Jizan seaport. The area is noted for its high-quality production of fruits such as mangoes, figs, papayas, plums, and coffee. Saudi Arabia annexed 'Asir, Najran, and Jizan from Yemen in 1934.

Jizan has one of the largest megaprojects market in the kingdom with significant infrastructure projects worth many billions of dollars. Saudi Aramco is building the 400,000-bpd Jazan Refinery with associated terminal facilities on the Red Sea near the city, scheduled for completion in late 2018.

== Economy ==
In the early 20th century, Jizan was a major site for pearl fishing. When World War I began, trade declined, due to ships moving to Al Hudaydah.

Ambitious projects in transport, renewable energy, tourism, and agricultural development are taking place in the Jizan region, particularly in Jazan Economic City, including a US$3 billion aluminum smelter.

=== Jazan Refinery ===
Jazan Refinery is a megaproject under construction and owned by Saudi Aramco. The refinery will process heavy and medium crude oil to create liquefied petroleum gas, sulfur, asphalt, benzene, and paraxylene. It is expected to produce 400,000 barrels per day.

In July 2026, it was attacked by Yemen’s Houthis. Several missiles and drones struck the plant resulting in plumes of black smoke and flames rising from the site. On July 27, it was shut down.It was then attacked again in early August, by the Yemeni Rebel group, the Al-Houthis.

== Transport ==
Jazan Port and Jizan Regional Airport serve the city of Jizan.

== Ethnography ==
The inhabitants of Jizan are Arab who mainly follow Sunni Islam with a small Zaydi minority.

== Population ==
- 2004: 255,340
- 2010: 163,703
- 2022: 200,911

== Climate ==
Jizan has a hot desert climate (Köppen: BWh) with a rainfall below 200 mm per year and an average annual temperature above 30 °C (86 °F). The weather is very hot all year round and its average annual temperature is one of the hottest in the world, as daily lows average over 20 °C (68 °F) and highs over 30 °C (86 °F) even in the mildest month of the year, while unlike a lot of tropical cities the summer is even noticeably warmer. It is very humid but parched in some months, making the weather volatile. Sandstorms are quite common in areas further from the sea.

The highest recorded temperature was 46.3 °C (115.3 °F) on 15 September 2006, while the lowest was 11.8 °C (53.2 °F) on 7 February 1993.

Climate data for Jazan (1991-2020)
Month	Jan	Feb	Mar	Apr	May	Jun	Jul	Aug	Sep	Oct	Nov	Dec	Year
Record high °C (°F)	34.0 (93.2)	34.9 (94.8)	38.1 (100.6)	43.6 (110.5)	44.0 (111.2)	43.1 (109.6)	42.3 (108.1)	45.3 (113.5)	46.3 (115.3)	43.0 (109.4)	42.3 (108.1)	38.0 (100.4)	46.3 (115.3)
Mean daily maximum °C (°F)	30.7 (87.3)	31.2 (88.2)	32.9 (91.2)	35.4 (95.7)	37.7 (99.9)	38.4 (101.1)	38.3 (100.9)	38.0 (100.4)	38.0 (100.4)	36.5 (97.7)	34.0 (93.2)	31.8 (89.2)	35.2 (95.4)
Daily mean °C (°F)	26.3 (79.3)	26.9 (80.4)	28.4 (83.1)	30.8 (87.4)	32.7 (90.9)	33.8 (92.8)	33.9 (93.0)	33.4 (92.1)	33.1 (91.6)	31.5 (88.7)	29.3 (84.7)	27.3 (81.1)	30.6 (87.1)
Mean daily minimum °C (°F)	22.0 (71.6)	22.9 (73.2)	24.4 (75.9)	26.6 (79.9)	28.4 (83.1)	30.1 (86.2)	30.5 (86.9)	29.8 (85.6)	29.0 (84.2)	26.7 (80.1)	24.8 (76.6)	22.9 (73.2)	26.5 (79.7)
Record low °C (°F)	14.9 (58.8)	11.8 (53.2)	16.3 (61.3)	18.8 (65.8)	19.1 (66.4)	23.0 (73.4)	21.0 (69.8)	19.0 (66.2)	20.0 (68.0)	20.3 (68.5)	18.3 (64.9)	17.0 (62.6)	11.8 (53.2)
Average precipitation mm (inches)	13.2 (0.52)	3.2 (0.13)	4.7 (0.19)	11.1 (0.44)	9.0 (0.35)	1.6 (0.06)	16.4 (0.65)	32.3 (1.27)	8.5 (0.33)	20.2 (0.80)	16.2 (0.64)	17.0 (0.67)	153.4 (6.04)
Average precipitation days (≥ 1 mm)	1.2	0.5	0.6	0.7	0.6	0.4	1.3	2.9	1.2	1.8	1.1	1.2	13.5
Average relative humidity (%)	73	73	70	66	64	64	60	64	67	67	69	73	68
Source: World Meteorological Organization, Jeddah Regional Climate Center (humidity 1985-2010)

Jazan mean sea temperature
Jan	Feb	Mar	Apr	May	Jun	Jul	Aug	Sep	Oct	Nov	Dec
26.8 °C (80.2 °F)	26.6 °C (79.9 °F)	27.6 °C (81.7 °F)	28.9 °C (84.0 °F)	30.7 °C (87.3 °F)	31.9 °C (89.4 °F)	31.5 °C (88.7 °F)	31.6 °C (88.9 °F)	32.0 °C (89.6 °F)	32.0 °C (89.6 °F)	30.5 °C (86.9 °F)	28.7 °C (83.7 °F)

== See also ==
- Jazan Economic City
- List of cities and towns in Saudi Arabia
- Samtah
