= Samtah =

- City
- Location in Saudi Arabia
- Coordinates: 16°35′50″N 42°56′38″E
- Country: Saudi Arabia
- Province: Jizan Province
- Time zone: UTC+3 (EAT)
  - Summer (DST): UTC+3 (EAT)

Samtah (Arabic: صامطة; also Romanized as Şāmitah or Samta) is a town and sub-division in Jizan Province, in southwestern Saudi Arabia.

In March 2022, the Houthis launched a ballistic missile at an electric substation in Samtah, which set it on fire.

== See also ==
- List of cities and towns in Saudi Arabia
- Regions of Saudi Arabia
