= Jazan Province =

Administrative region of Saudi Arabia

Coordinates: 17°30′N 42°30′E

Jazan جازان
- province
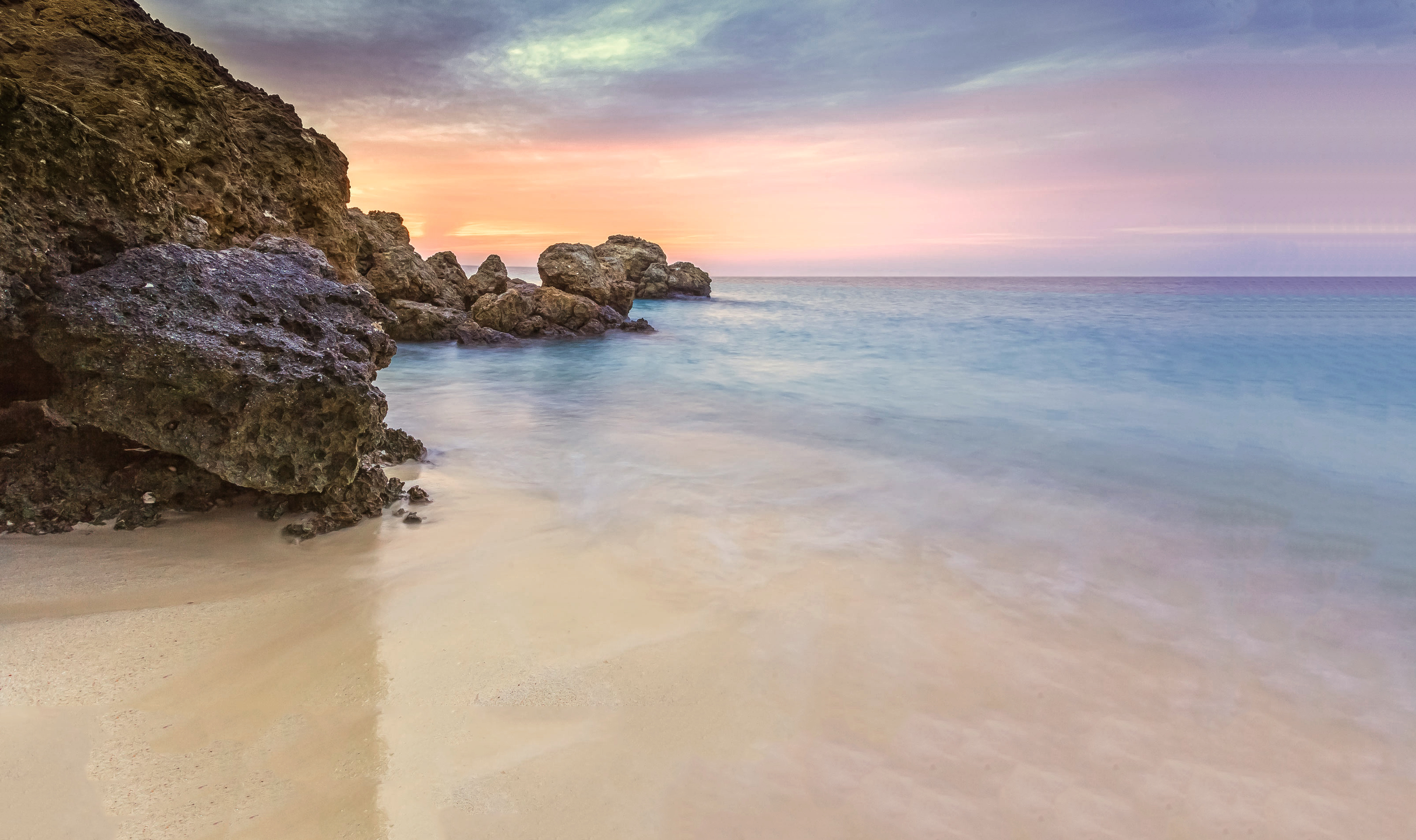
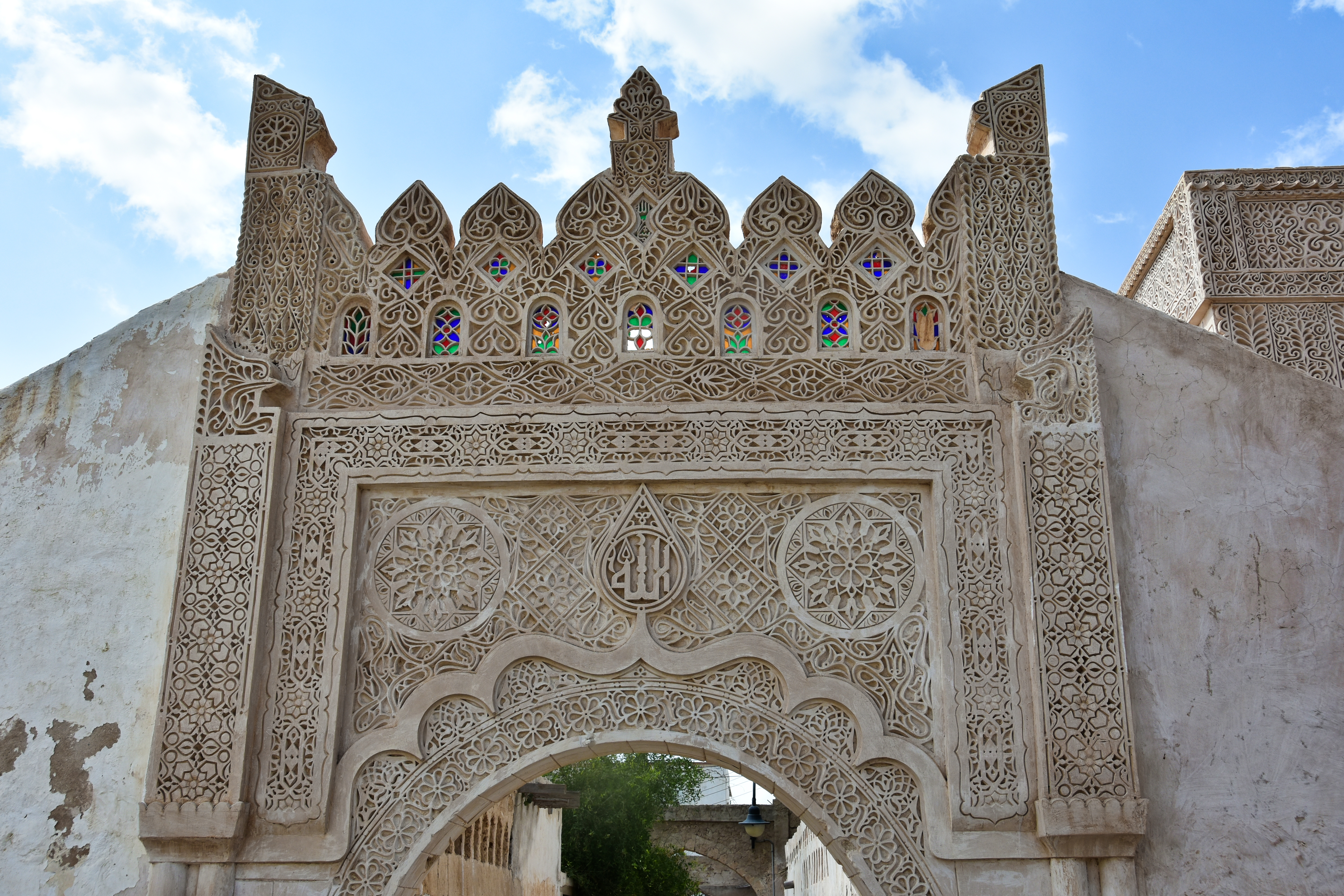
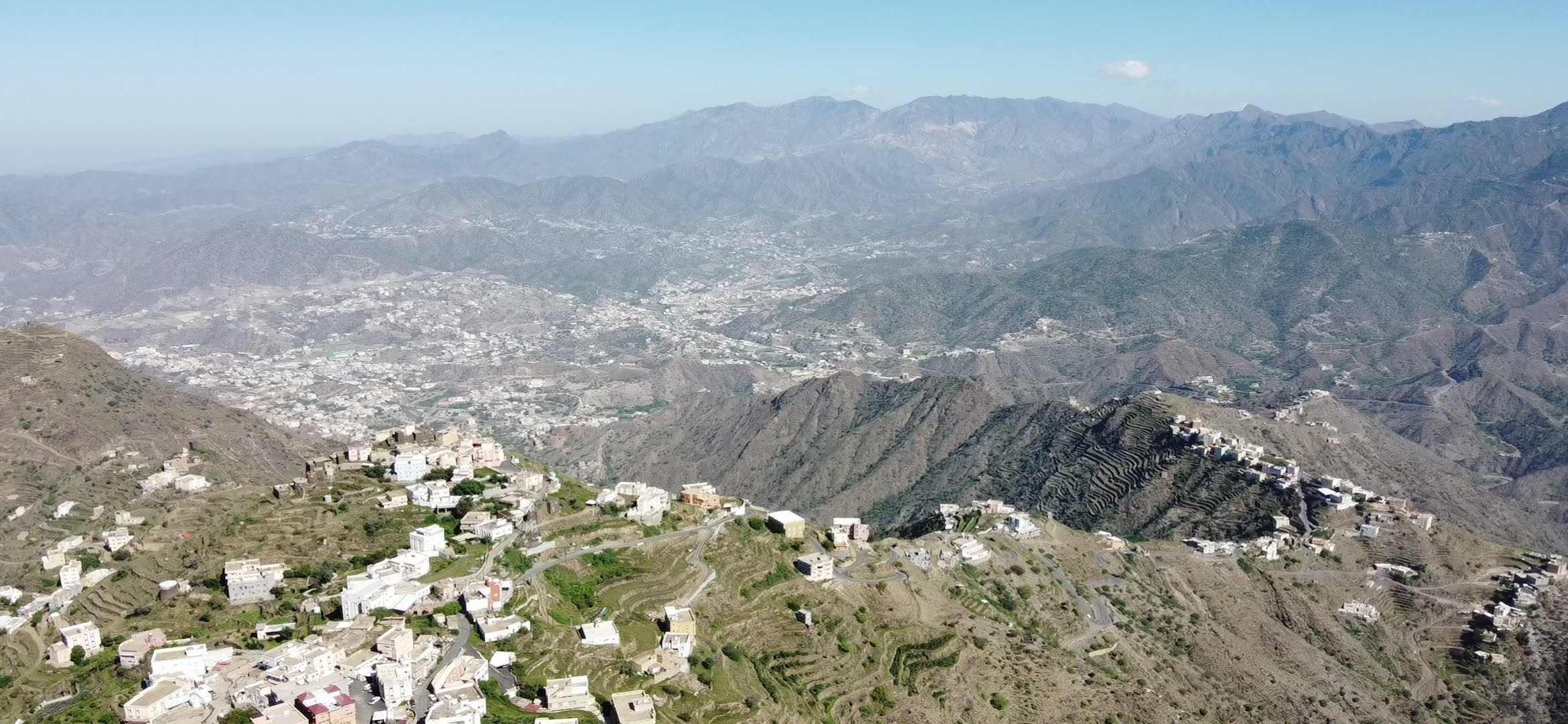
- Beach in Farasan Islands Al-Rifai House, Farasan Al-Dayer Mountain

- Seal

- Map of Saudi Arabia with Jazan highlighted
- Country: Saudi Arabia
- Region: South Arabia
- Capital and administrative center: Jizan
- Governorates: 16

Government
  - Type: Municipality
  - Body: Jazan Municipality
  - Governor: Mohammed bin Abdulaziz
  - Deputy Governor: Nasser bin Mohammed.

Area
  - Total: 11,671 km^{2} (4,506 sq mi)

Population (2022 Census)
  - Total: 1,404,997
  - Density: 120.38/km^{2} (311.79/sq mi)
- Demonym(s): Jazani (Male); Jazania (Female)
- Time zone: UTC+03:00 (SAST)
- ISO 3166-2: SA–09
- Area code: 09
- Website: www.jazan.sa

The Jazan Province, also known as the Jazan Region (Arabic: مِنْطَقَةُ جَازَان, romanized: Minṭaqatu Jāzān), is the second-smallest province of Saudi Arabia after al-Bāḥa. It stretches approximately 300 km (190 mi) along the southern coast of the Red Sea, just north of the border with Yemen. Covering an area of 13,457 km^{2}, it had a population of 1,404,997 according to the 2022 census. The province has the highest population density in the Kingdom.

The province includes over 200 islands in the Red Sea. One of the major developments in the province is the Jazan City for Primary and Downstream Industries, a large-scale project intended to contribute to the province’s economic development. The Farasān Islands, Saudi Arabia’s first conservation-protection area, are home to migratory birds from Europe during the winter.

== History ==
=== Ancient times ===
Human activity in Jazan (or Jizan) dates back to the Stone Age, as confirmed by archaeological studies and research carried out in the region, which showed that the first human settlement was during the Lower Paleolithic period. Tools belonging to the age of the Acheulean civilization have been found, and surveys have shown that the Red Sea coast region is one of the best sources of information on the Acheulean stage. Due to the proliferation of hunting tools found in excavations, researchers infer that the inhabitants of the Acheulean settlements relied for their survival on seafood, such as fish and shellfish, given their availability and nutritional value.

In light of its important strategic position, situated on ancient trade routes between Yemen and the Ḥijāz, on the one hand, and between the Levant and beyond, on the other, Jazan Province maintained cultural links with the ancient kingdoms that thrived in the south of the Arabian Peninsula. Human settlement in Jazan was contemporaneous with kingdoms such as the Minaean (Maʿīn) Kingdom, Kingdom of Sheba (Sabaʾ), Kingdom of Qatabān, Kingdom of Ḥaḍramawt, and the Ḥimyar Kingdom. However, Jazan was not politically subordinate to any of them; in fact, archaeological evidence suggests that the inhabitants of the region were not in agreement with those neighbouring kingdoms and governed according to their own interests.

=== Islamic age ===
Jazan Province has been an Islamic Arab territory since the early Islamic age. A delegation from the region journeyed to the prophet Muḥammad in Madīna in the tenth year of his migration, headed up by the chieftain of the al-Hakam tribe, Abduljad Bin Rabia al-Hakami, and declared their embrace of Islam. After the spread of Islam in the south of the Arabian Peninsula, Mohammed appointed provincial governors in these multiple territories, including the province of Tihamah, with which Jazan was affiliated.

=== Saudi era ===
After the founding, King Abdulaziz reclaimed the rule of Riyadh and established the Kingdom, whereupon the King led unification campaigns throughout the Arabian peninsula. At the time, the regions of Jazan and Tihamat-Aseer in the southwest of the Arabian peninsula formed a chiefdom ruled by a dynasty known as the Idrisids, in the Emirate of Asir. The Treaty of Makkah (1926) was concluded between the founding king and the region’s ruler, al-Hassan al-Idrisi, on October 21, 1926. Under the treaty, the territory came under the mandate of King Abdulaziz and remained so for four years, until the treaty was annulled by the Idrisid rulers. Consequently, the founding King sent troops to recapture the territory, and al-Hassan al-Idrisi ceded his rule in 1930; thus, Jazan was the last region of the Arabian peninsula to join Saudi rule.

== Geography ==
The province divides into three parts.

- The Sarawat Mountains inland, which rise to about 3,000 metres.
- The Al-hazoun forest district consists of forest broken by some areas of rich pasture.
- The plains are noted for the production of coffee beans, cereal grain crops (barley, millet and wheat) and fruit (apples, bananas, grapes, mangoes, papayas, plums and citrus varieties).

Though the climate in the highlands is similar to the relatively wetter climate of Asir, the coastal regions of Jazan province are part of Tihamah, probably the hottest place in the country, with mean maximum temperatures ranging from 40 °C (104 °F) in July to 31 °C (88 °F) in January. High humidity from coastal lagoons makes the climate even less bearable than it would be otherwise. Rainfall is extremely low at less than 75 millimetres (3 inches) per year. The city of Sabya is located midway between the mountains and the beach.

=== Wadi Lajab ===
Wadi Lajab is a valley located in the Ar Rayth Governorate in the north-eastern part of Jazan Province. It is one of the most popular tourist sites in the province. The valley was formed by an ancient geological fault dating back to the era of African tectonic movements, creating a deep canyon with soaring cliffs, flowing streams, and lush greenery.

Stretching approximately 11 km from north to south, Wadi Lajab is characterized by narrow, winding passages between towering rock walls ranging from 300 to 800 m in height. Unlike the typical dry valleys found in the Arabian Peninsula, Wadi Lajab contains running water throughout much of the year.

The unique rock formations within the valley display a variety of colours and rock types, including granite, basalt, metamorphic rocks, setting them apart from the surrounding mountains. The valley’s sides are covered by thick moss, small shrubs and bright, green ferns alongside towering trees.

== Population ==
Historical population
Year	Pop.	±% p.a.
1992	865,961	—
2004	1,157,587	+2.45%
2010	1,264,845	+1.49%
2018	1,373,659	+1.04%
2022	1,404,997	+0.57%

== Governorates ==
The province is divided into 16 governorates, classified into categories A and B based on the availability of services, with Jizan serving as the capital and administrative center of the province. Jizan has a population of 200,911 (2022).

Governorates of Jazan Province
Governorate	Category	Population (2004 census)	Population (2010 census)	Population (2022 census)
Abu Arish	A	123,943	196,462	187,060
Al Dayer	B	49,239	58,325	47,424
Al Darb	B	52,062	70,740	68,965
Ahad al Masarihah	B	70,038	109,866	130,545
Al Aridhah	B	62,841	76,033	79,730
Al Aydabi	B	52,515	61,043	32,940
Al-Harth	B	47,073	23,496	11,561
Ar Rayth	B	13,406	19,022	16,877
Baish	B	58,269	77,406	86,996
Damad	B	62,366	71,256	64,136
Farasan	B	13,962	18,015	13,529
Fayfa	B	–	–	19,346
Sabya	A	198,086	227,519	223,083
Samtah	A	128,447	201,959	154,925
Harub	B	–	–	30,709
At Tuwal	B	–	–	36,259
Total Province		1,187,587	1,374,845	1,436,706

== Ethnography ==
The Arabic language is spoken by over 90% of the inhabitants. Parts of Jazan have been claimed to be part of a “greater Yemen” by many Yemenis despite not having been ruled from Yemen since the fall of the Himyar Kingdom in 525 CE. Since then, the areas comprising Jazan Province were mostly independent, and they also formed part of the First Saudi state during the 18th century. Jazan was annexed by Saudi Arabia in 1932 and was defended against a Yemeni invasion, which led to the Saudi–Yemeni war in 1934, after which ʾImām Yaḥyā suspended Yemen’s claim to the province in the Treaty of aṭ-Ṭāʾif. Nevertheless, many Yemeni nationalists continued to claim Jazan until the issue was settled formally and finally in the Saudi-Yemeni border agreement of 2000.

== Climate ==
Jazan Province's climate is impacted by tropical winds, and the weather is generally very hot in summer and mild in winter, except for the mountain highlands, where temperatures are moderate and there is rainfall throughout the year.

=== Humidity ===
The humidity level is 50% in the area west of the Jazan Valley Dam and decreases to the east of it.

=== Precipitation ===
Precipitation occurs during the late summer and early fall months and is characterized by its irregular patterns. In some years, there are heavy rainfall events, which support agricultural activities, and the dam captures a significant portion of that precipitation. Conversely, in other years, there are minimal rainfall events, which prove insufficient for agricultural production.

== Economy ==
Jazan’s attractiveness for business investment is helped by its location on the Red Sea, close to the Horn of Africa and the Yemeni border, which generates various export and commerce opportunities for all industrial, agricultural and fishery producers in the region.

In April 2023, Crown Prince Mohammed bin Salman announced the establishment of 4 new special economic zones (SEZ), one of which is located in Jazan. It covers a total area of 24.6 sq km and aims to open up opportunities for international investors. The SEZ aims to attract $2.93 billion in foreign investments by 2040.

=== Fishing ===
The coastline of Jazan is approximately 330 km long. The province yields 6,394 tons of fish and shellfish annually. According to a report by the Jazan Chamber of Commerce, this annual yield includes 1,753 tons of narrow-barred Spanish mackerel, 1,261 tons of Lethrinidae, 87 tons of shellfish, 794 tons of bagrus, 740 tons of barracudas, 444 tons of sharks and rays, 469 tons of groupers, 442 tons of mixed fish, and 428 tons of tuna. This amounts for more than 20% of Saudi Arabia's fisheries production.

=== Agriculture ===
Jazan is considered one of the most important and fertile agricultural regions of Saudi Arabia. The region produces more than 30 types of fruit, including mangoes, guavas and papayas. Other agricultural varieties include coffee and wheat.

In May 2022, the Saudi Public Investment Fund (PIF) launched the Saudi Coffee Company, which aims to make Saudi coffee a global product. The PIF is expected to invest more than $319 million in the national coffee industry by 2032, to help boost annual production from 300 tons to 2,500 tons.

According to the Ministry of Environment, Water, and Agriculture, Jazan’s livestock population exceeds 3.977 million, including more than 1.72 million sheep, 2.1 million goats, about 95,400 cattle and 57,400 camels.

=== Metal conversion industries ===
The geographical location of the Jazan region is pivotal to the development of mining-related manufacturing industries. The Arabian-Nubian Shield and its proximity to the mineral-rich African continent constitute a competitive advantage and an important source of raw materials.

== Monuments and tourist attractions ==
- Al Dosariyah Castle
- Al Rifai House, Farasan Islands
- Wadi Lajab
- Wednesday Market (Souq al-Samil)
- Al-Asha roundabout
- Al-Zahir
- Al-Khazan Alshamly
- Dar al-Nasr Castle
- Al Qubbab Mosque, Abu Arish

=== Local market ===
Abu Arish's popular market is a significant commercial hub within the city. It is also known as the Robua Market or the Samil Market. It is a traditional market that has been in operation for a very long time, attracting considerable numbers from various villages within the Abu Arish Governorate on a weekly basis to engage in commercial activities. The market offers a variety of traditional household items, including crockery, tools crafted from palm fronds, textiles utilized for clothing, agricultural implements, and livestock. The market, which is held every Wednesday, is an ancient gathering place for the people of Abu Arish and its surroundings.

== Infrastructure ==
=== Education ===
The city of Abu Arish has been known for its scholarly circles since olden times, such groupings being held at the city's mosques to teach the Qur'an and Hadith. Notable scholars include Abdullah ibn Ali al-Amoudi and his son, Saleh ibn Abdullah al-Amoudi, as well as Abdullah Adam, Muhammad Zakri, and Musa al-Manqari. Subsequently, Abdullah Al-Qaraawi's educational institutions were established and, over time, conventional schools proliferated, numbering a total of 65 schools for girls and approximately 66 schools for boys.

=== Faculties and institutes ===
- The College of Shari'ah and Law, affiliated with Jazan University.
- The College of Arts and Humanities, affiliated with Jazan University.
- Community College for Girls, affiliated with Jazan University.
- Technical College for Girls in Jazan.
- Manahil Knowledge Institute for Women's Education and Training.
- Maharat Institute - Jazan Contractors Alliance for Training and Employment.

== Healthcare ==
Abu Arish City is home to a 150-bed public hospital, which offers a range of medical specialties, in addition to two primary care centers. Among the most prominent hospitals located within the city are:

- Abu Arish General Hospital.
- Chest Diseases Hospital.
- Jarash Medical Hospital.
- Safwa Dental Clinic.
- Al-Salama dispensary.
- Almariya Medical Center.
- Al-Hakami Medical Complex.
- Dr. Daifallah Daqdaki Center.
- Al-Hayat Specialty Center.
- Al-Hayat Medical Center.

== Transportation ==
=== Air ===
Jazan Province is served by King Abdullah International Airport. A new airport, the New King Abdullah International Airport, is under development and will replace the existing facility upon completion.

=== Roads ===
- Highway 10

== Sports ==
Jazan is home to 7 professional sports clubs:

- Al-Tuhami Club based in Jizan. The club was founded in 1948.
- Al-Yarmouk Club based in Abu 'Arish. The club was founded in 1970.
- Al-Amjad Club based in Sabya. The club was founded in 1974.
- Hetten FC based in Samtah. The club was founded in 1976.
- Al-Sawari Club based in Farasan Islands. The club was founded in 1978.
- Al-Watan Club based in Damad. The club was founded in 1980.
- Fayfa Club based in Fayfa. The club was founded in 2015.

== List of governors ==
Name	Term of Office	Monarch(s)
Office established
Turki bin Ahmed al-Sudairi	1952 – 1977	Abdulaziz, Saud, Faisal, Khalid
Mohammed bin Turki al-Sudairi	1977 – 2 April 2001	Khalid, Fahd
Mohammed bin Nasser	2 April 2001 – 8 May 2025	Fahd, Abdullah, Salman
Mohammed bin Abdulaziz	8 May 2025 – present	Salman

== See also ==
- Provinces of Saudi Arabia
- List of governorates of Saudi Arabia
- List of cities and towns in Saudi Arabia
