= Cross Egypt Challenge =

Annual cross-country endurance motorcycle and scooter rally conducted throughout Egypt

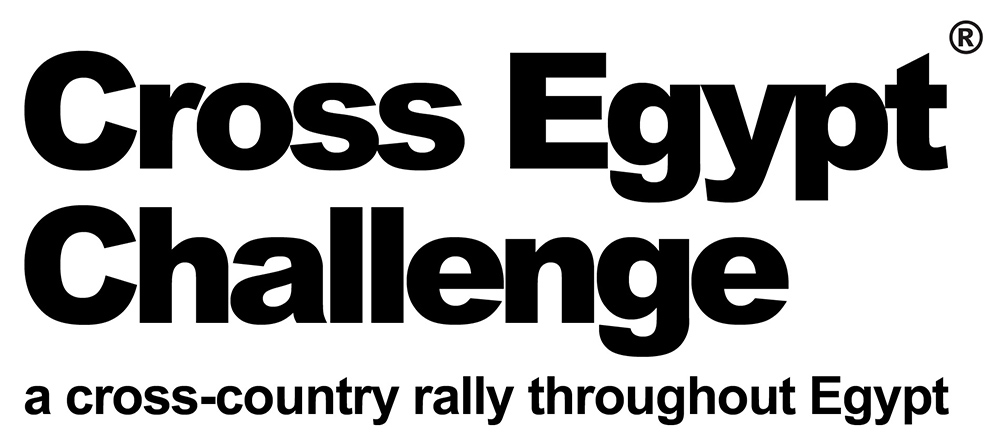
- Category: Cross-Country Rally
- Country: Egypt (2011–present)
- Inaugural season: 2011
- Official website: www.crossegyptchallenge.com

Cross Egypt Challenge (or simply CEC) is an annual cross-country endurance motorcycle and scooter rally conducted throughout the most difficult and challenging roads and tracks of Egypt. The rally is open to amateur and professional riders from around the globe.

The distance of the rally ranges between 2500 and 3000 km but with a different route every year. Participants usually ride from 200 to 500 km per day.

== History ==
Cross Egypt Challenge started in the year 2011 when one night in Alexandria, Ahmad Elzoghby, Founder of the Cross Egypt Challenge, was enjoying a normal evening with his cousins when one of them suggested they should take a trip to Sharm El Sheikh – on their scooters.

The idea of traveling to another city by scooter intrigued Elzoghby. Few days later, at another get together with his cousins, he proposed a daring idea. “I thought if we could go to Sharm Elsheikh, we could go anywhere else, scooter rallies are organised all over the world, but nothing like this had ever been done in Egypt. And there is no reason why we should not have an event like that here; we have the space, a beautiful country and great places to visit.”

The declining tourist numbers after the revolution worried Elzoghby and the Cross Egypt Challenge seemed a good idea to generate international media interest. “After the revolution, the global media focussed mainly on the problems Egypt was having, creating the impression that Egypt had stopped being safe,” he explained. “Yes, we are facing big challenges but for the most part Egypt is a safe place to be. I wanted to show the world that it is possible to travel across the country on a scooter and arrive safely.”

The international media loved the idea, and stories were carried by the likes of BBC, National Geographic and Discovery Channel. After the success of the challenge in its first year back in 2011, Elzoghby and his team decided that they would turn the Cross Egypt Challenge into an annual event.

=== 2011 Edition ===
The first season of Cross Egypt challenge took place between October 14 and 22, 2015, and was a 9 days ride from the shores of the Mediterranean Sea in the North of Egypt to the temple of Abu Simbel, on the southern borders of Egypt with a total distance of about 1700 km. 15 riders from 3 different countries took place in the 2011 season in which 14 were able to complete the challenge successfully.

The challenge began at the site of the modern Bibliotheca Alexandrina in the ancient city of Alexandria, passed by the Great Pyramids of Giza in Cairo, and crossed the Nile River and the Suez Canal on the way to the eastern Egyptian border at Taba. The riders head south to the cities of Neuwebaa and Dahab before reaching the world famous resort city of Sharm El Sheikh. They then took a ferry across the Gulf of Suez to Hurghada and continued their journey to the legendary city of Luxor; the world largest open-air museum, where they rode down the avenue of the sphinxes to reach the magnificent temple of Karnak. The team continued to Aswan and further south to end the journey in front of the most famous temple of Ramses II, Abu Simbel, on the shores of Lake Nasser.

DISTANCE	STAGE
210 km	Alexandria - Cairo
140 km	Cairo - Suez
413 km	Suez - Taba - Dahab
100 km	Dahab - Sharm Elsheikh
FERRY	Sharm Elsheikh - Hurghada
288 km	Hurghada - Luxor
220 km	Luxor - Aswan
290 km	Aswan - Abu Simbel
1700 km	TOTAL DISTANCE

=== 2012 Edition ===
The 2012 season of Cross Egypt Challenge began on October 12, 2012 and lasted for 8 days. The season witnessed a 2400 km route starting from Egypt's capital and the home of the famous Tahrir Square, Cairo then head toward the coastal city of Alexandria before going west to the city of Marsa Matrouh. From Marsa Matrouh, the riders rode south and explored the most fascinating oases of the Egyptian Sahara; Siwa, Bahareya, Farafra, Dakhla and Kharga before arriving to the final destination, Luxor, the world's largest open-air museum.

The 2012 season had 25 riders 10 different countries. 24 in which were able to complete the challenge successfully.

DISTANCE	STAGE
275 km	Cairo - Alexandria
325 km	Alexandria - Marsa Matrouh
325 km	Marsa Matrouh - Siwa Oasis
300 km	Siwa Oasis - route to Bahariya Oasis
325 km	Route to Bahariya Oasis - Farafra Oasis
300 km	Farafra Oasis - Dakhla Oasis
200 km	Dakhla Oasis - Kharga Oasis
350 km	Kharga Oasis - Luxor
2400 km	TOTAL DISTANCE

=== 2013 Edition ===
The 2013 season started on November 8, 2013 and lasted for 9 days. The total distance of the 2013 route was 2400 km and started from the Mediterranean city of Alexandria; passed by Egypt's capital, Cairo, made stops at the Western Desert Oases of Bahareya, Farafra, Dakhla, and Kharga, then head east towards Luxor, Hurghada, and Sokhna before ending the journey in Cairo at the foot of the Great Pyramids of Giza.

44 riders from 11 different countries took place in the 2013 season of Cross Egypt Challenge.

DISTANCE	STAGE
225 km	Alexandria - Cairo
365 km	Cairo - Bahariya Oasis
185 km	Bahariya Oasis - Farafra Oasis
275 km	Farafra Oasis - Dakhla Oasis
225 km	Dakhla Oasis - Kharga Oasis
350 km	Kharga Oasis - Luxor
290 km	Luxor - Hurghada
330 km	Hurghada - Sokhna
155 km	Sokhna - Cairo
2400 km	TOTAL DISTANCE

=== 2014 Edition ===
The fourth season of Cross Egypt Challenge started on November 14, 2014 and lasted for 9 days. The 2014’s 3000 km route started from the Mediterranean city of Alexandria; passed by Egypt's capital, Cairo, made stops at Ain Sokhna, El Gouna, Marsa Alam before crossing the Egyptian Eastern Desert towards Luxor and Aswan, then made went deep south to Abu Simbel at the southern borders of Egypt before heading north by the Nile Valley towards Assiout and then ending the journey in Cairo under the Great Pyramids of Giza.

52 riders from 11 different countries took place in the 4th season of Cross Egypt Challenge, 48 of which were able to complete the challenge successfully.

DISTANCE	STAGE
380 km	Alexandria - Sokhna
275 km	Sokhna - El Gouna
320 km	El Gouna - Marsa Alam
345 km	Marsa Alam - Aswan
285 km	Aswan - Abu Simbel
285 km	Abu Simbel - Aswan
265 km	Aswan - Luxor
365 km	Luxor - Assiout
430 km	Assiout - Cairo
2950 km	TOTAL DISTANCE

=== 2015 Edition ===
The 2015 and fifth anniversary season of Cross Egypt Challenge started on October 23, 2015 and lasted for 9 days. The 2,725 km route began from the Mediterranean's largest coastal city, Alexandria then passed through the Capital - Cairo - en route to the Red Sea's resort Sokhna before going South to visit the amazing resort cities of Sahl Hashish and Marsa Alam on the Red Sea shore. The challenge then headed west to the Nile valley to visit the ancient city of Luxor, the world's largest open-air museum city, and the capital of Ancient Egypt where the participants spent two days in celebration for the rally's 5th anniversary.

From Luxor the riders headed North-west to explore some of the most fascinating oasis of the Egyptian Sahara (desert). A total number of 3 oases were explored en route before the final leg of the 2015 season of Cross Egypt Challenge took place between Bahareya Oasis and Cairo to end the new season at the most sacred place in Egypt, under the Great Pyramids of Giza.

DISTANCE	STAGE
395 km	Alexandria - Sokhna
295 km	Sokhna - Sahl Hashish
275 km	Sahl Hashish - Marsa Alam
375 km	Marsa Alam - Luxor
0 km	Rest in Luxor
345 km	Luxor - Kharga Oasis
225 km	Kharga Oasis - Dakhla Oasis
450 km	Dakhla Oasis - Bahareya Oasis
365 km	Bahareya Oasis - Cairo
2,725 km	TOTAL DISTANCE

=== 2016 Edition ===
The 2016 season of Cross Egypt Challenge returned back to the Egyptian western desert after 2 years of absence and included a 2,700 km route finished in 9 days. The 2016 route Started from Alexandria at the shores of the Mediterranean Sea and went through the Egyptian western desert, the Nile valley, the Egyptian eastern desert and the Red Sea Riviera before heading back north and finishing the season in the most sacred place in Egypt, under the Great Pyramids of Giza

DISTANCE	STAGE
210 km	Alexandria - Cairo
310 km	Cairo - Minya
380 km	Minya - Kharga Oasis
360 km	Kharga Oasis - Luxor
260 km	Luxor - Aswan
345 km	Aswan - Marsa Alam
225 km	Marsa Alam - Hurghada
340 km	Hurghada - Ain Sokhna
150 km	Ain Sokhna - Cairo
2,700 km	TOTAL DISTANCE

=== 2017 Edition ===
The 2017 season of Cross Egypt Challenge featured a great route that span over 8 stages and 2,500 km. The 2017 route started from Alexandria and went through the Mediterranean coast, the Red Sea Riviera, Egyptian eastern desert, Egyptian western desert and the Nile valley before finishing the season in the most sacred place in Egypt, under the Great Pyramids of Giza.

DISTANCE	STAGE
260 km	Alexandria - Port Said
210 km	Port Said - Ain Sokhna
340 km	Ain Sokhna - El Gouna
330 km	El Gouna - Marsa Alam
350 km	Marsa Alam - Aswan
240 km	Aswan - Luxor
0 km	Rest day in Luxor
450 km	Luxor - Minya
320 km	Minya - Cairo
2,500 km	TOTAL DISTANCE

=== 2018 Edition ===
The 2018 season of Cross Egypt Challenge featured a fantastic route that span over 7 stages and 2,475 km. The 2018 route started from Alexandria and went through the Mediterranean coast, the Red Sea Riviera, Egyptian eastern desert, Egyptian western desert and the Nile valley before finishing the season in the most sacred place in Egypt, under the Great Pyramids of Giza.

DISTANCE	STAGE
340 km	Alexandria - Ismailia
450 km	Ismailia - El Gouna
290 km	El Gouna - El Gouna
330 km	El Gouna - Marsa Alam
0 km	Rest day in Marsa Alam
390 km	Marsa Alam - Aswan
240 km	Aswan - Luxor
0 km	Rest day in Luxor
450 km	Luxor - Minya
320 km	Minya - Cairo
2,475 km	TOTAL DISTANCE

=== 2019 Edition ===
The 2019 season of Cross Egypt Challenge featured a fantastic route that span over 7 stages and 2,320 km. The 2019 route started from Alexandria and went through the Mediterranean coast, the Nile Valley, Egyptian eastern deserts, and the Red Sea Riviera before finishing the season in the most sacred place in Egypt, under the Great Pyramids of Giza.

DISTANCE	STAGE
215 km	Alexandria - Cairo
310 km	Cairo - Minya
460 km	Minya - Luxor
0 km	Rest day in Luxor
450 km	Luxor - Berenice
0 km	Rest day in Berenice
390 km	Berenice - Hurghada
320 km	Hurghada - Sokhna
175 km	Sokhna - Cairo
2,320 km	TOTAL DISTANCE

Cross Egypt Challenge is considered the only organized cross-country rally of its kind in the entire region and combines the best of adventure travel and extreme sport. Each season of the endurance rally introduces a new route throughout the most famous spots of Egypt. Tens of adventure riders fly to Egypt yearly to take part of the famous challenge.

== List of participants ==
=== 2011 participants ===
Name	Country	Classification	CEC Number
Ahmad Elzoghby	Egypt	Scooter	10
Mohamed Elsherbiny	Egypt	Scooter	1
Osama Kamal	Egypt	Scooter	12
Mahmoud Faisal	Egypt	Scooter	13
Mona Elmadany	Egypt	Scooter	15
Hussein Elsherbiny	Egypt	Scooter	16
Andrado Romero	Mexico	Scooter	2
Bassem Samuel	Egypt	Scooter	3
Ashok Singh	United States	Scooter	4
Ghada Elshafie	Egypt	Scooter	5
Sara Tabana	Egypt	Scooter	6
Ahmed Elsherbiny	Egypt	Scooter	7
Karim Hallabo	Egypt	Scooter	8
Charles Reaume	United States	Scooter	9
Wael Sam	Egypt	Scooter	11

=== 2012 participants ===
Name	Country	Classification	CEC Number
Ahmad Elzoghby	Egypt	Scooter	10
Mohamed Elsherbiny	Egypt	Scooter	1
Aaser Ahmed	Egypt	Scooter	6
Dewane Vanleuven	United States	Scooter	
Dimitrios Gkiokezas	Greece	Scooter	
Emmanuel Shekoni	Nigeria	Scooter	
Ibrahim Elashmawy	Egypt	Scooter	
Gunner Skrydstrup	Denmark	Scooter	
Jonathan Smith	Canada	Scooter	
Kenneth Wilson	United States	Scooter	
Khaled Eldarwish	Egypt	Scooter	
Maged Mansi	Egypt	Scooter	
Mahmoud El Sheikh	Egypt	Scooter	
Michael Bobadilla	United States	Scooter	
Mohamed Bin Abdullah	Singapore	Scooter	
Owen Lewis	United Kingdom	Scooter	
Pablo Veitch	Argentina	Scooter	
Ramy Amer	Egypt	Scooter	
Ramses Slim	Egypt	Scooter	
Simon Haisz	Canada	Scooter	
Steven Burbidge	United Kingdom	Scooter	
Tarek Safwat	Egypt	Scooter	8
Thomas Schneider	Germany	Scooter	
Timothy Shear	United States	Scooter	
Wallace Quan	Canada	Scooter	

=== 2013 participants ===
Name	Country	Classification	CEC Number
Ahmed Abouelkheir	Egypt	Scooter	2
George Berenbrok	United States	Scooter	3
Alejandro Gonzales	Mexico	Scooter	4
Barb Piatkowski	Canada	Scooter	5
Aaser Ahmed	Egypt	Scooter	6
Peeter Cooper	New Zealand	Scooter	7
Tarek Safwat	Egypt	Scooter	8
Dimitris Giokizas	Greece	Scooter	9
Jose Augusto Pedroso	Brazil	Scooter	11
Maged Mansi	Egypt	Scooter	12
Jacqui Bowring	Australia	Scooter	13
Khaled Eldarwish	Egypt	Scooter	14
Ramses Slim	Egypt	Scooter	15
Stephen Liard	Canada	Scooter	16
Mario Mantovani	Brazil	Scooter	17
Khaled Badawy	Egypt	Scooter	18
Jesus Hugo Estrada	Mexico	Scooter	19
Karim Yehia	Egypt	Scooter	20
Maxine Featherstonhaugh	Canada	Scooter	21
Ibrahim Elashmawy	Egypt	Scooter	22
Iain Brown	Australia	Scooter	23
Steven Burbidge	United Kingdom	Scooter	24
Ahmed Johnson	South Africa	Scooter	25
Julian Kamaludin	Brunei	Scooter	26
Alejandro Urbina	Mexico	Scooter	27
Anthony Paterno	Brazil	Scooter	28
Alfred Zdrazil	United States	Scooter	29
Wael Esmael	Egypt	Scooter	30
Dorothy Lenehan	United States	Scooter	31
Anthony Tessier	United Kingdom	Scooter	32
Christopher Hunn	Australia	Scooter	33
Hesham Kamal	Egypt	Scooter	34
James Balz	United States	Scooter	35
Mary Couse	United States	Scooter	36
Mohamed Ellithy	Egypt	Scooter	37
Raul Gonzales	Mexico	Scooter	38
Tamer Walash	Egypt	Scooter	39
Natalie Knowlton	United States	Scooter	40
Pierre Du Plessis	South Africa	Scooter	41
Sherif Badr	Egypt	Scooter	42
Rubens Filho	Brazil	Scooter	43
Steven Longfield	Canada	Scooter	44
Stuart Dowell	United Kingdom	Scooter	45
Walid Hammad	Egypt	Scooter	46

=== 2014 participants ===
Name	Country	Classification	CEC Number
Hussein Elsherbiny	Egypt	Motorcycle	1
Ahmed Abou El Kheir	Egypt	Scooter	2
Ahmed Soliman	Egypt	Scooter	3
Abdelrahman Kassem	Egypt	Scooter	4
Alejandro Chacón	United States	Scooter	5
Aaser Ahmed	Egypt	Scooter	6
Barb Piatkowski	Canada	Scooter	7
Tarek Safwat	Egypt	Scooter	8
Becky Burbidge	United Kingdom	Scooter	9
Botti Giannantonio	Italy	Motorcycle	11
Carla Godenzi	Peru	Scooter	12
Carlos Sanchez	Peru	Scooter	13
Khaled Eldarwish	Egypt	Scooter	14
David Marshall	Australia	Scooter	15
David Procter	Canada	Motorcycle	16
David Batty	Australia	Scooter	17
Denise Chew	United States	Scooter	18
Doug Marshall	Australia	Scooter	19
Drew Garcia	United States	Scooter	20
Edward Perry	United States	Scooter	21
Wilmer Mozo	Peru	Scooter	22
Ihab Saleh	Egypt	Scooter	23
Steven Burbidge	United Kingdom	Scooter	24
Mahmoud Rashed	Egypt	Scooter	25
Jacinta Ryan	Australia	Scooter	26
Jazmin Martin	Mexico	Scooter	27
João Martins	Portugal	Scooter	28
John Philips	United Kingdom	Scooter	29
Wael Ismail	Egypt	Scooter	30
Kenneth Wilson	United States	Scooter	31
Jorge Riega	Peru	Scooter	32
Jorge Vargas	Peru	Scooter	33
Kim Hennick	Canada	Scooter	34
Loay Samy	Egypt	Motorcycle	35
Vivek Prasannan	India	Motorcycle	36
Mary Sist	Canada	Scooter	37
Maxine Featherstonhaugh	Canada	Scooter	38
Michelle Garcia	United States	Scooter	39
Mohamed Hussein	Egypt	Scooter	40
Mohamed El Sheikh	Egypt	Scooter	41
Nela Rimmerova	Czech Republic	Scooter	42
Nelson Alvarado	Peru	Scooter	43
Omar Ghaly	Egypt	Motorcycle	44
Omar Mansour	Egypt	Motorcycle	45
Ramy Harfoush	Egypt	Scooter	46
Sherif Badr	Egypt	Scooter	48
Steve Bonham	Canada	Scooter	49
Marwan El Rouby	Egypt	Scooter	50
Willem Van Kesteren	Australia	Scooter	51
William Ryan	Australia	Scooter	52
William Sahlman	Australia	Scooter	53

=== 2015 participants ===
Name	Country	Classification	CEC Number
Mohamed Elsherbiny	Egypt	Motorcycle	1
Ahmed Abou El Kheir	Egypt	Scooter	2
Alessandro Botti	Italy	Scooter	3
Chao-Hsjang Lee	Taiwan	Scooter	4
Chin-Chen Wang	Taiwan	Scooter	5
Aaser Ahmed	Egypt	Scooter	6
Chin-I Wu	Canada	Scooter	7
Tarek Safwat	Egypt	Scooter	8
Ching-Cheng Wang	Taiwan	Scooter	9
Cletha Walstrand	United States	Motorcycle	11
Dafne Campos	Brazil	Scooter	12
Derek Vann	Canada	Scooter	13
Khaled Eldarwish	Egypt	Scooter	14
Drew Garcia	United States	Scooter	15
Eric Villancourt	United States	Motorcycle	16
Greg Griffin	United States	Scooter	17
Heather Butler	Australia	Scooter	18
Inaco Barros	Brazil	Scooter	19
Joao Martines	Portugal	Scooter	20
John Deikis	United States	Scooter	21
Katherin Pyatt	United States	Scooter	22
Klaus Misins	Australia	Scooter	23
Marco-Eduardo Herthel	Brazil	Scooter	24
Micheal Davies	United States	Scooter	25
Michelle Garcia	United States	Scooter	26
Otto Rieve	Canada	Scooter	27
Paula Shaw	Australia	Scooter	28
Pete Surber	United States	Scooter	29
Plabo Campos	Brazil	Scooter	30
Ramu Nimmalapudi	India	Scooter	31
Robert Geiman	United States	Scooter	32
Scott Fryer	Australia	Scooter	33
Stella Misins	Australia	Scooter	34
Tai-Ming Chu	Taiwan	Motorcycle	35
Tung-Sheng Fan	Taiwan	Motorcycle	36
Tuze-Wu Chiang	Taiwan	Scooter	37
Walter Raio	Brazil	Scooter	38
Ahmed Elsentreecy	Egypt	Scooter	42
Ashraf Madkour	Egypt	Scooter	43
Ayman Kyrollos	Egypt	Scooter	44
Omar Mansour	Egypt	Scooter	45
Ramy Harfoush	Egypt	Motorcycle	46
Omar Mansour	Egypt	Motorcycle	45
Botti Giannantoni	Italy	Scooter	47
Bruce Claremont	United States	Scooter	48
Carlos Mondragon	Mexico	Scooter	49
Emad Benjamin	Egypt	Scooter	50
Grosso Gianmarco	Italy	Scooter	51
Ihab Saleh	Egypt	Scooter	52
Lawrence Durante	Canada	Scooter	53
Luis Luna	Mexico	Scooter	54
Mark Jensen	United Kingdom	Scooter	55
Maurizio Scodeller	Italy	Scooter	56
Mohamed Eltayebi	Egypt	Scooter	57
Mohamed Elsayed	Egypt	Scooter	58
Mohamed Sharara	Egypt	Scooter	59
Mohamed Elsaid	Egypt	Scooter	60
Omar Ghaly	Egypt	Scooter	61
Ottavio Barbetta	Egypt	Scooter	62
Ralph Beranek	Germany	Scooter	63
Russel Stewart	Australia	Scooter	64
Sherif Attia	Egypt	Scooter	65
Sherif Fawzi	Egypt	Scooter	66
Sherif Badr	Egypt	Scooter	67
Srinivas Chalasani	India	Scooter	68
Ashleigh Butler	Australia	Van	
Cecilla Botti	Italy	Van	
Chiung-Yin Chou	Taiwan	Van	
Elisabeth Raio	Brazil	Van	
Hui-Chuan Wu Huang	Taiwan	Van	
Maria-Cristina Herthel	Brazil	Van	
Shu-Chun Chang	Taiwan	Van	
Susann Graesslin	Germany	Van	

=== 2016 participants ===
Name	Country	Classification	CEC Number
Ahmed Abou El Kheir	Egypt	Scooter	2
Danish Ahmad	United Kingdom	Scooter	3
Charlotte Myrtle	United States	Scooter	4
Alexande Szymanik	United States	Scooter	5
Aaser Ahmed	Egypt	Scooter	6
Ahmed Keshk	Egypt	Scooter	7
Tarek Safwat	Egypt	Scooter	8
Chris Barnden	Australia	Scooter	9
Sheridan James	United Kingdom	Motorcycle	11
Maged Mansi	Egypt	Scooter	12
Monty Myrtle	United States	Scooter	13
Khaled Eldarwish	Egypt	Scooter	14
Thomas Baker	United States	Scooter	15
Carig Roden	Australia	Motorcycle	16
Micheal Vieau	United States	Scooter	17
Micheal Batt	Australia	Scooter	18
Paul Molenaar	Netherlands	Scooter	19
Walid Gallal	Egypt	Scooter	20
Mark Robertson	New Zealand	Scooter	21
Ibrahim El-Ashmawy	Egypt	Scooter	22
Hany Mahfouz	Egypt	Scooter	23
Tarek Elhaddad	Egypt	Scooter	25
Ahmed Ramadan	Egypt	Scooter	26
Magued Wassef	Egypt	Scooter	27
Edith Nelson	United States	Scooter	28
Jonella Stark	United States	Scooter	29
Dannielle Batt	Australia	Scooter	30
Robert Jones	Australia	Scooter	31
Simon Jones	Australia	Scooter	32
Naushad Bhagwagar	India	Scooter	33
Ahmadou Thiam	United States	Motorcycle	34
Guido Wissel	Germany	Motorcycle	35
Peter Ueberbacher	Austria	Motorcycle	36
Carl Stark	United States	Scooter	37
Christian Jensen	Denmark	Scooter	38
Ihab Saleh	Egypt	Scooter	39
Ahmed Elsentreecy	Egypt	Scooter	40
Sherif Badr	Egypt	Scooter	42
Sherif Attia	Egypt	Scooter	43
Islam Gawish	Egypt	Scooter	44
Walid Hammad	Egypt	Motorcycle	48
Omar Mansour	Egypt	Motorcycle	49
Annette Hauser	Germany	Car	
Stefan Hauser	Germany	Car	
Carol Barden	Australia	Van	
Ibrahim Saad	Egypt	Van	
Mehboob Akhtar	United Kingdom	Van	

=== 2017 participants ===
Name	Country	Classification	CEC Number
Mohamed Amin	Egypt	Scooter	3
Harry Hertzberg	Australia	Scooter	4
Hossam Salem	Egypt	Scooter	5
Aaser Ahmed	Egypt	Scooter	6
Mohamed Rashed	Egypt	Scooter	7
Tarek Safwat	Egypt	Scooter	8
Islam Gawish	Egypt	Scooter	9
Jeremy Hunter	Australia	Motorcycle	11
Amanda Hunter	Australia	Scooter	12
Pei-Shen Lin	Taiwan	Scooter	13
Khaled Eldarwish	Egypt	Scooter	14
Chih-Jung Hsaio	Taiwan	Scooter	15
Wen-Wei Chao	Taiwan	Motorcycle	16
Sheridan James	United Kingdom	Scooter	17
David White	Canada	Scooter	18
Aisling Heenan	United States	Scooter	19
Brook Dain	United States	Scooter	24
Hsaing-Tai Lu	Taiwan	Scooter	25
Karen Diggs	United States	Scooter	27
Tufan Chakir	Australia	Scooter	28
Ellen Schmid	Germany	Scooter	33
Ahmadou Thiam	United States	Scooter	34
Wayne Rimmer	New Zealand	Scooter	38
Martin Hall	United Kingdom	Scooter	40
Darrel Kloschinksy	Canada	Scooter	41
Sherif Attia	Egypt	Scooter	42
Viski Cressey	United States	Van	

=== 2018 participants ===
Name	Country	Classification	CEC Number
Ahmed Aboulkheir	Egypt	Scooter	2
Andrew Spittal	New Zealand	Scooter	3
Chia-Hsing Wei	Taiwan	Scooter	4
Hossam Salem	Egypt	Motorcycle	5
Aaser Ahmed	Egypt	Scooter	6
Ahmed Elhabashy	Egypt	Scooter	7
Tarek Safwat	Egypt	Motorcycle	8
Chien-Li Chen	Taiwan	Scooter	9
Chiu-Ming Hsu	Taiwan	Scooter	11
Chun-Yao Wu	Taiwan	Scooter	12
Deborah McConochie	New Zealand	Scooter	13
Khaled Eldarwish	Egypt	Scooter	14
Ashraf Eletriby	Egypt	Motorcycle	15
Dalia Fahmy	Egypt	Scooter	16
Hany Guirguis	Egypt	Scooter	17
Hossam Salah	Egypt	Scooter	18
Donald McConochie	New Zealand	Scooter	19
Ismael Gawish	Egypt	Scooter	20
Gary Donaldson	New Zealand	Scooter	21
Hsiaso-Ching Weng	Taiwan	Scooter	22
Joanne McClelland	New Zealand	Scooter	23
Mohamed Aly	Egypt	Scooter	24
Kuo-Long Chin	Taiwan	Scooter	25
Rafik Hakim	Egypt	Scooter	26
Li-Wen Chiu	Taiwan	Scooter	27
Michele O'Brien	United States	Scooter	29
Sherif Emile	Egypt	Scooter	30
Patrica Fleming	Australia	Scooter	35
Paula Piers	Portugal	Scooter	38
Gustavo Priyoltenskey	Argentina	Scooter	40
Steven McKenney	United States	Scooter	41
Stefen Ludwig	Switzerland	Scooter	42
Curtis Chapman	United States	Scooter	43
Einer Moen	Norway	Scooter	44
Houman Dehghani	Australia	Scooter	45
Urban Scherrer	Switzerland	Scooter	46
Abigail Turner	Canada	Scooter	47
Alexandra Holm	Denmark	Scooter	48
Armando Monroy	Mexico	Scooter	49
David Pilley	Canada	Scooter	50
Rock O'Keefe	Australia	Scooter	51
Yong-Qing Tsai	Taiwan	Scooter	52
Yu-Chao Hsiao	Taiwan	Scooter	53
Yu-Wen Chang	Taiwan	Scooter	54

=== 2019 participants ===
Name	Country	Classification	CEC Number
Ahmed Aboulkheir	Egypt	Scooter	2
Robert Kemp	United States	Scooter	3
Mathew Smoose	United States	Scooter	4
Hossam Salem	Egypt	Motorcycle	5
Aaser Ahmed	Egypt	Scooter	6
Ricardo Florida	Peru	Scooter	7
Tarek Safwat	Egypt	Motorcycle	8
Sheridan James	United Kingdom	Scooter	9
Robert stacy	United States	Scooter	11
Monika Koestli	Switzerland	Scooter	12
Khaled Eldarwish	Egypt	Motorcycle	14
Douglas Carrie	Canada	Motorcycle	15
Francesco Paiano	Australia	Scooter	16
Franziska Forrer	Australia	Scooter	17
Dalia Fahmy	Egypt	Scooter	18
Ahmed Elsentreecy	Egypt	Scooter	19
Hany Mahfouz	Egypt	Scooter	20
Asser Hussein	Egypt	Scooter	21
Maryse Hebert	Canada	Scooter	22
Winston Chow	United States	Scooter	23
Abrie Snyman	South Africa	Scooter	24
Moahemd ELbashbishy	Egypt	Scooter	25
Mohammed Bassem	Egypt	Scooter	26
Hesham Baher	Egypt	Scooter	27
Gordon Sylvester	Canada	Scooter	29
Hossam Salah	Egypt	Scooter	30
Ismael Gawish	Egypt	Scooter	31
Mohamed Ramzy	Egypt	Scooter	32
Walid Hammad	Egypt	Scooter	33
Wessam Ragab	Egypt	Scooter	34
Jacoub Terblanche	South Africa	Scooter	37
Rolf Muehlemann	Switzerland	Scooter	40
Abu-Bakr Saleh	Switzerland	Scooter	41
Edouard Erb	Switzerland	Scooter	43
Salwa Elyamany	Egypt	Van	

== Television coverage ==
- October 2011: Aljazeera Documentary Channel produced a full-length documentary about the first season of Cross Egypt Challenge. However, due to production issues at the channel, the movie was aired in June 2014. The film crew followed the riders of the first season as they travelled through Egypt on their scooters and documented their journey from day to day and from town to town. Link to the full movie: https://www.youtube.com/watch?v=QHEljtydvpE
- September 2011: National Geographic radio conducted a radio interview with Ahmad Elzoghby of Cross Egypt Challenge to speak about the initiative and what their plans for the future are. Link to the full episode: https://web.archive.org/web/20150810163427/http://radio.nationalgeographic.com/radio/ng-weekend-archives/1139/
- November 2014: Egyptian TV station CBC broadcast a short documentary about the 2014 season of Cross Egypt Challenge Link to the documentary: https://www.youtube.com/watch?v=RonYqHddY3w
- December 2014: Interview with Ahmad Elzoghby, founder of Cross Egypt Challenge to speak about the recently finished 2014 season of Cross Egypt Challenge on Sabah ON morning show on Egyptian TV station OnTV. Link to the interview: https://www.youtube.com/watch?v=qDG50FrJmdw
- February 2015: Famous Egyptian sport program "Doos Banzeen" on Mehwar Channel dedicated an episode about the 2014 season of Cross Egypt Challenge. Link to the episode: https://www.youtube.com/watch?v=mYAgaDirv0o

== Incidents ==
Australian rider died in 2016
