= Hurghada Grand Aquarium =

Aquarium in Hurghada, Egypt

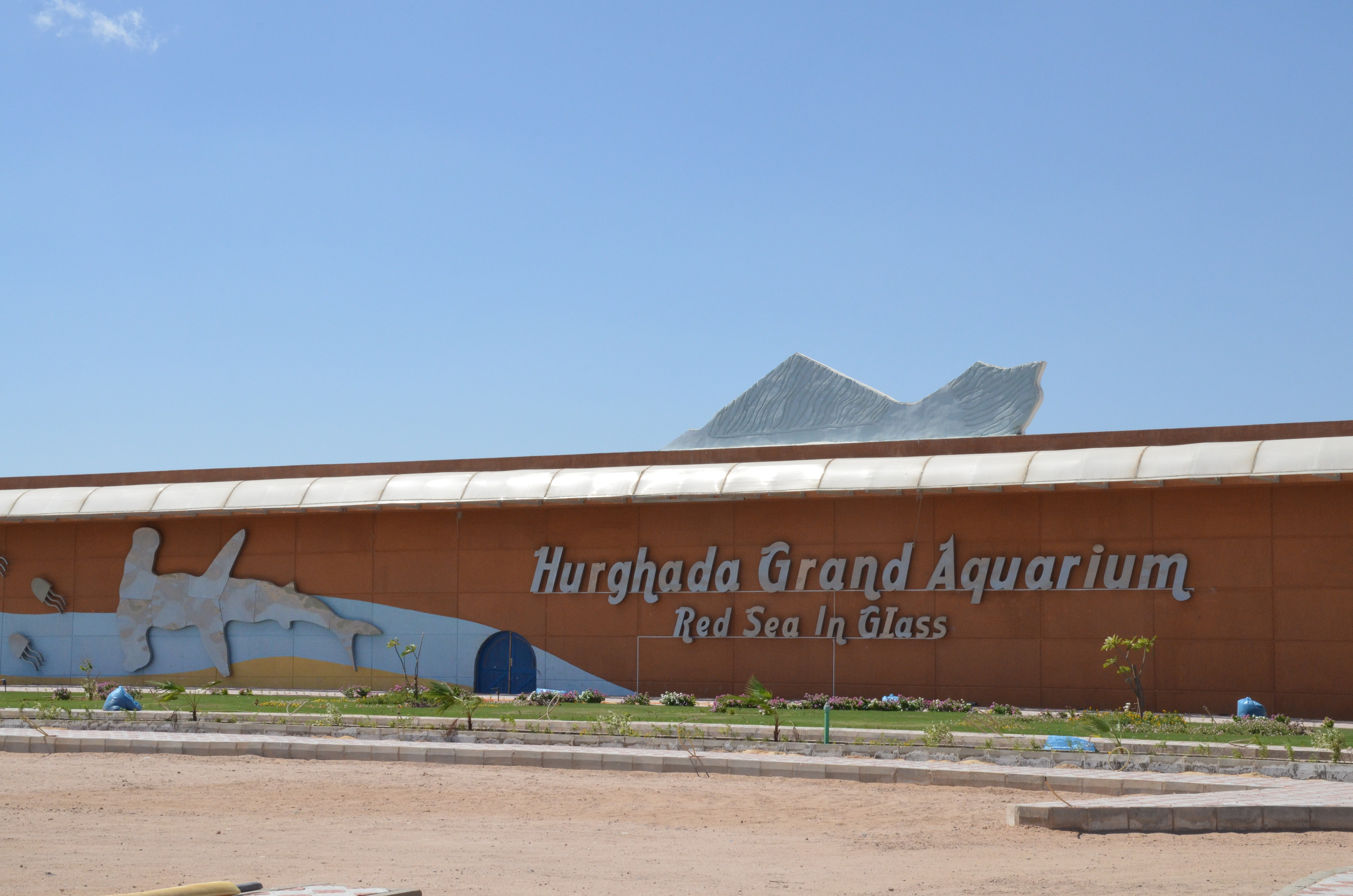
- Interactive map of Hurghada Grand Aquarium
- 27.1337°N 33.8217°E
- Date opened: 23 January 2015
- Location: Hurghada, Egypt
- Land area: 9.8 acres
- No. of animals: 1200+
- No. of species: 100
- Volume of largest tank: 1,800 m^{3} (500,000 US gal)
- Total volume of tanks: 3,500 m^{3} (900,000 US gal)
- Major exhibits: 24
- Owner: Magdy Abdel Latif, Ali Abdel Razek, Mohamed Taha

The Hurghada Grand Aquarium is an aquarium located in the Magawish area of Hurghada, Egypt. Opened in January 2015, it contains nearly 3,500 cubic metres (900,000 US gallons) in tank space.

== Overview ==
The aquarium is home to over 1200 individual animals, and 100 species. It is easily one of the continent's largest aquariums, as well as Egypt's largest and nearly the largest in the Arab world. It contains 24 separate exhibits, included among them a shark tunnel, rainforest and "Whale Valley", based on fossils found in the Western Desert. The facility is also home to a Bedouin life exhibit, and an animal zoo. The Aquarium's notable specimens include: nurse shark, stingrays, green sea turtle, shovelnose guitarfish and eagle rays.

== Complete list of animals found at the Aquarium ==
So far, many animals have been sighted at the aquarium. These animals include but are not limited to the green iguana, white-backed vulture, Nile crocodile, great white pelican, Egyptian fruit bat, pharaoh eagle-owl, greater flamingo, grivet, green sea turtle, Indo-Pacific sergeant, Acanthopagrus bifasciatus, giant moray, Arabian Picasso triggerfish, nurse shark, shovelnose guitarfish, orbicular batfish, koi, red lionfish, Red Sea clownfish, spotted eagle ray, sandbar shark, Indian peafowl, Egyptian goose, African spurred tortoise, and the ostrich.

== See also ==
- Makadi Bay
- Red Sea Riviera
