= Russian School Hurghada =

School in Hurghada, Red Sea, Egypt

Russian School Hurghada Russian: Русская школа в Хургаде

Information
- School type: International school
- Years: 1-11
- Language: Russian
- Website: hurghada-school.com

Russian School Hurghada (Russian: Русская школа в Хургаде, romanized: Russkaya shkola v Khurgade) is a private Russian international school in Hurghada, Egypt. It serves primary (years 1–4) and secondary (years 5–11) sections.

== See also ==
- Egyptian Russian University
