= Giftun Islands =

Islands in Egypt

Coordinates: 27°13′N 33°56′E

Native name: جزيرة الجفتون
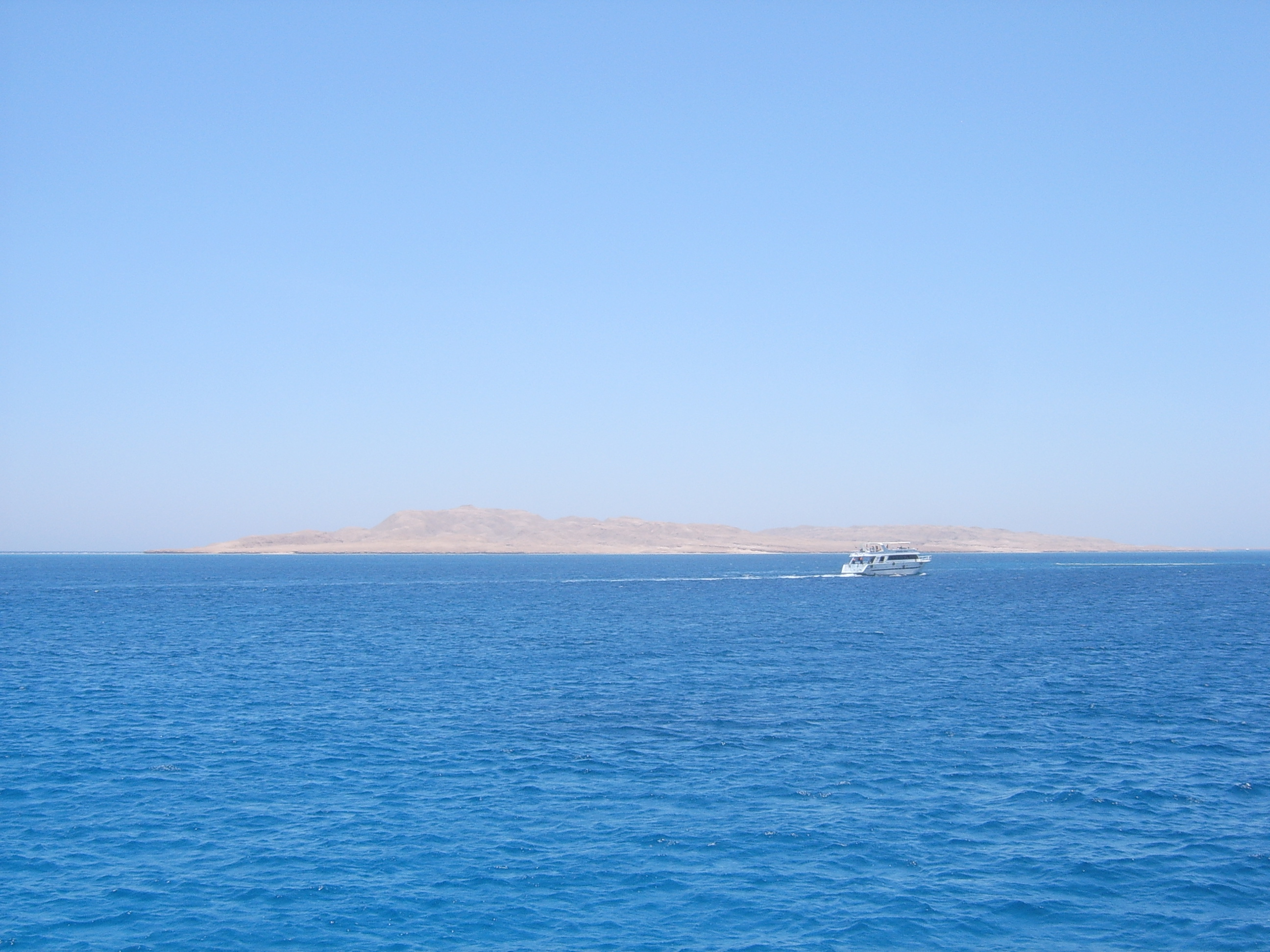
- Interactive map of Giftun Islands

Geography
- Location: Red Sea

Administration
- Egypt

The Giftun Islands (also spelled Giftoun) are two islands in the Red Sea near Hurghada in Egypt. Giftun Kebir (جفتون الكبيرة) or Big Giftun is located further west and closer to Hurghada. Giftun Soraya (جفتون ثريا) or Little Giftun is further east.
