= German School Hurghada =

- Hurghada; Egypt

Information
- Founded: 2006
- Age: 2 to 18
- Enrollment: 230
- Language: German
- Website: https://www.deutsche-schule-hurghada.de/

German School Hurghada (German: Deutsche Schule Hurghada, DSH) is a German international school in Hurghada, Egypt. The school serves nursery (age 2) until the end of high school.

== History ==
The school was founded in 2006 under the sponsorship of Red Sea Hotels.

== Demographics ==
The school had approximately 230 people from 21 different nationalities.
