= Egyptian Russian University =

University in Egypt

Coordinates: 30°08′32″N 31°43′07″E

- الجامعة المصرية الروسية; El Gāmi`ah El Maṣriyyah El Rūsiyyah; Египетско-российский университет Yegipetsko-Rossiyskiy Universitet
- Type: Private
- Established: 2006
- President: Prof. Dr. Sherif Fakhry Abdelnaby
- Academic staff: 1000
- Undergraduates: 9000
- Location: Badr City, Cairo Governorate, Egypt
- Campus: Urban, 32.30 acres (13.07 ha)
- Website: www.eru.edu.eg

The Egyptian Russian University (ERU) is located in Badr City, Cairo Governorate, Egypt. It was established in 2006.

== History ==
An agreement on the establishment of ERU was reached during the visit of the Russian President Vladimir Putin to Cairo. On May 23–25, 2005, in pursuance of the agreements reached at the April summit in Cairo, Egypt visited the Minister of Education and Science of Russia Andrei Fursenko. On August 15, 2006, in Moscow, a protocol was signed between the Ministry of Education and Science of Russia and the Ministry of Higher Education and Scientific Research of Egypt's cooperation in the field of education. Particular attention in the framework of cooperation in this field is the project of Egyptian-Russian University (ERU), the agreement of the creation of which is fixed in the Joint Statement of the Prime Minister of Russia and Egypt on the results of Putin's visit to Cairo.

On July 15, 2006, the President of Egypt signed a decree establishing the ERU and in the same year, he performed the first set of students. On July 15, 2006 Hosni Mubarak, Egypt's president signed a decree on the establishment of the Egyptian-Russian University. The implementation of this project took place with the support of the Ministry of Education of Russia and the Russian Embassy in Egypt.

== Campus ==
The Egyptian Russian University is located on a 32-acre (13.07 ha) campus in Badr City.

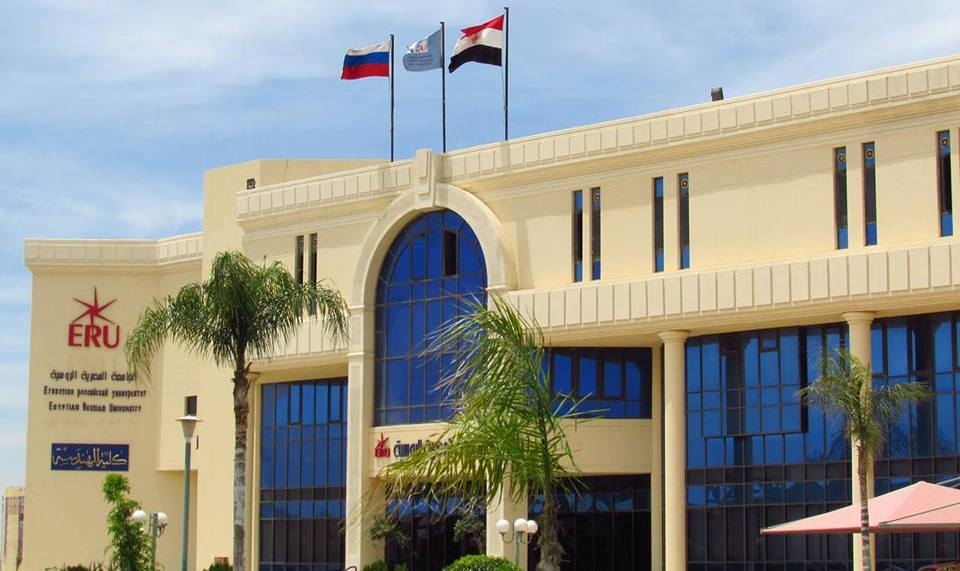
Egyptian Russian University

== See also ==
- Russian School Hurghada
