= Badr, Egypt =

Badr بدر
- City
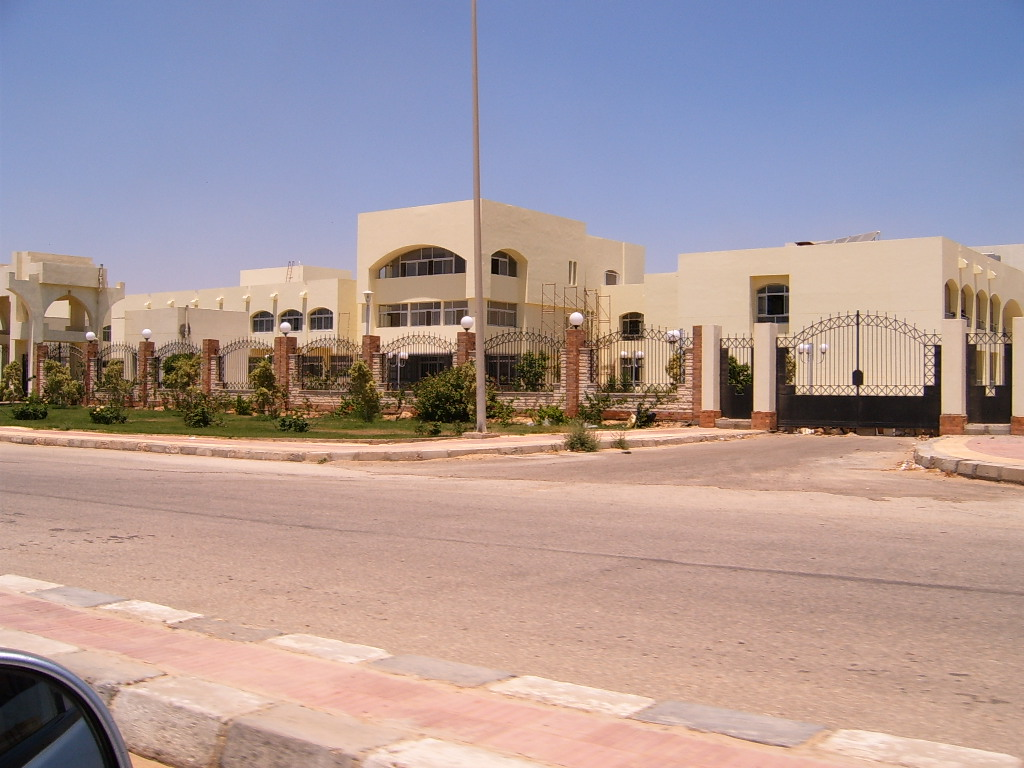

- Location in Egypt
- Country: Egypt
- Governorate: Cairo

Area
  - Total: 162.0 sq mi (419.6 km^{2})

Population (2023 est.)
  - Total: 33,456
  - Density: 206.5/sq mi (79.73/km^{2})
- Time zone: UTC+2 (EET)
  - Summer (DST): UTC+3 (EEST)

Badr (Egyptian Arabic: بدر pronounced [bædɾ]) is a satellite city in the Eastern Area of Cairo, Egypt. It was planned and is administered by the New Urban Communities Authority(NUCA). Badr was established in 1982 according to Prime Ministerial Decree 235/1982 allocating NUCA 3000 acres in the Eastern Desert on the Cairo-Suez Highway. It has since grown to 21,000 acres, and has a 2200 acre industrial zone that includes 564 factories, in addition to 501 factories still under construction.

== Overview ==
It is the nearest industrial city to Cairo International Airport, Suez Port, it is also close to the Delta and the Suez Canal.

Projects in Badr are exempted from taxes for up to 10 years from the date at which their operation commenced.

Most factories are built with the aim of exporting to Arab, African and world markets. In 2017, the census recorded 31,299 residents.

== Climate ==
The Köppen-Geiger climate classification system classifies its climate as a hot desert (BWh), as the rest of Egypt. The climate is generally extremely dry all over the year except some sporadic rain during the winter months. In addition to rarity of rain, extreme heat during summer months is also a general climate feature of Badr although daytime temperatures are milder during autumn and winter.

Climate data for Badr City
Month	Jan	Feb	Mar	Apr	May	Jun	Jul	Aug	Sep	Oct	Nov	Dec	Year
Mean daily maximum °C (°F)	18.1 (64.6)	19.8 (67.6)	23.2 (73.8)	27.8 (82.0)	32 (90)	34.4 (93.9)	34.9 (94.8)	34.6 (94.3)	31.8 (89.2)	29.8 (85.6)	24.9 (76.8)	20.1 (68.2)	27.6 (81.7)
Daily mean °C (°F)	12.8 (55.0)	14 (57)	16.7 (62.1)	20.3 (68.5)	24.2 (75.6)	26.9 (80.4)	27.8 (82.0)	27.9 (82.2)	25.4 (77.7)	23.5 (74.3)	19.4 (66.9)	14.7 (58.5)	21.1 (70.0)
Mean daily minimum °C (°F)	7.6 (45.7)	8.2 (46.8)	10.2 (50.4)	12.9 (55.2)	16.4 (61.5)	19.4 (66.9)	20.8 (69.4)	21.2 (70.2)	19.1 (66.4)	17.2 (63.0)	13.9 (57.0)	9.4 (48.9)	14.7 (58.5)
Average precipitation mm (inches)	6 (0.2)	4 (0.2)	4 (0.2)	2 (0.1)	0 (0)	0 (0)	0 (0)	0 (0)	0 (0)	1 (0.0)	4 (0.2)	5 (0.2)	26 (1.1)
Source: Climate-Data.org (altitude: 216m)

== Infrastructure ==
=== Education ===
The city houses four universities:

- Egyptian-Russian University
- Future University in Egypt
- Egyptian E-Learning University
- Badr University in Cairo BUC.

=== Health care ===
The city has a central national hospital, Badr Hospital. The hospital was founded in the early 2005 and started working in 2009. Badr Hospital is owned by Helwan University and is now assigned to be a University Hospital.

== See also ==
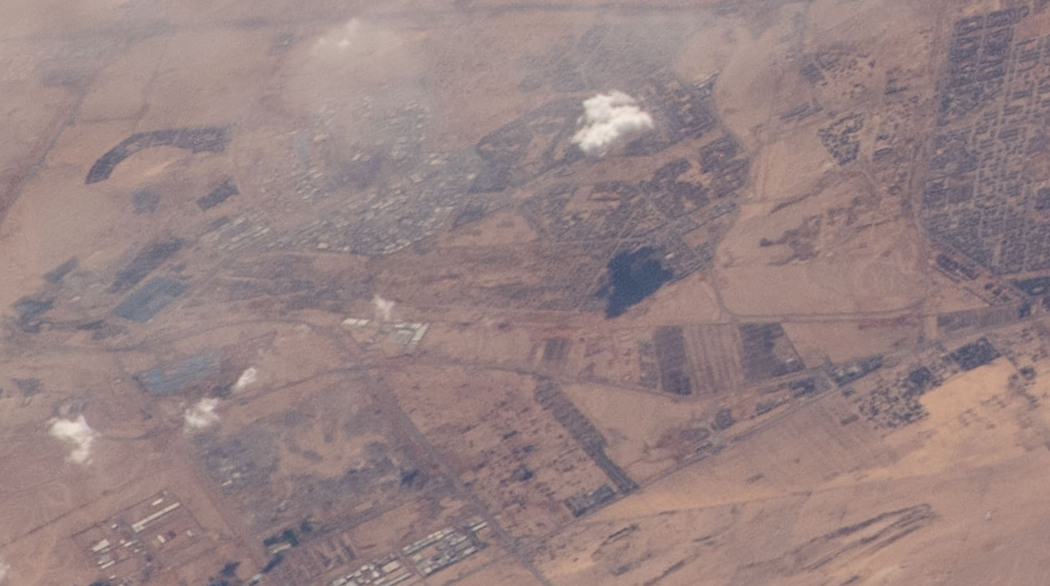
Badr and New Heliopolis from above

- New Urban Communities Authority
- Shorouk City
- New Cairo
- Satellite city
