= Fanadir =

Recreational dive site in the Red Sea

El Fanadir is a famous dive site in the Red Sea, located in the north of Hurghada, Egypt. El Fanadir North has a reef wall down to 12 metres, then a plateau extends out to 20 metres giving way to a drop off reaching well beyond 30 metres.
