= Sahl Hasheesh =

Town in Egypt

Coordinates: 27°02′57″N 33°53′21″E

Sahl Hasheesh سهل حشيش
- town
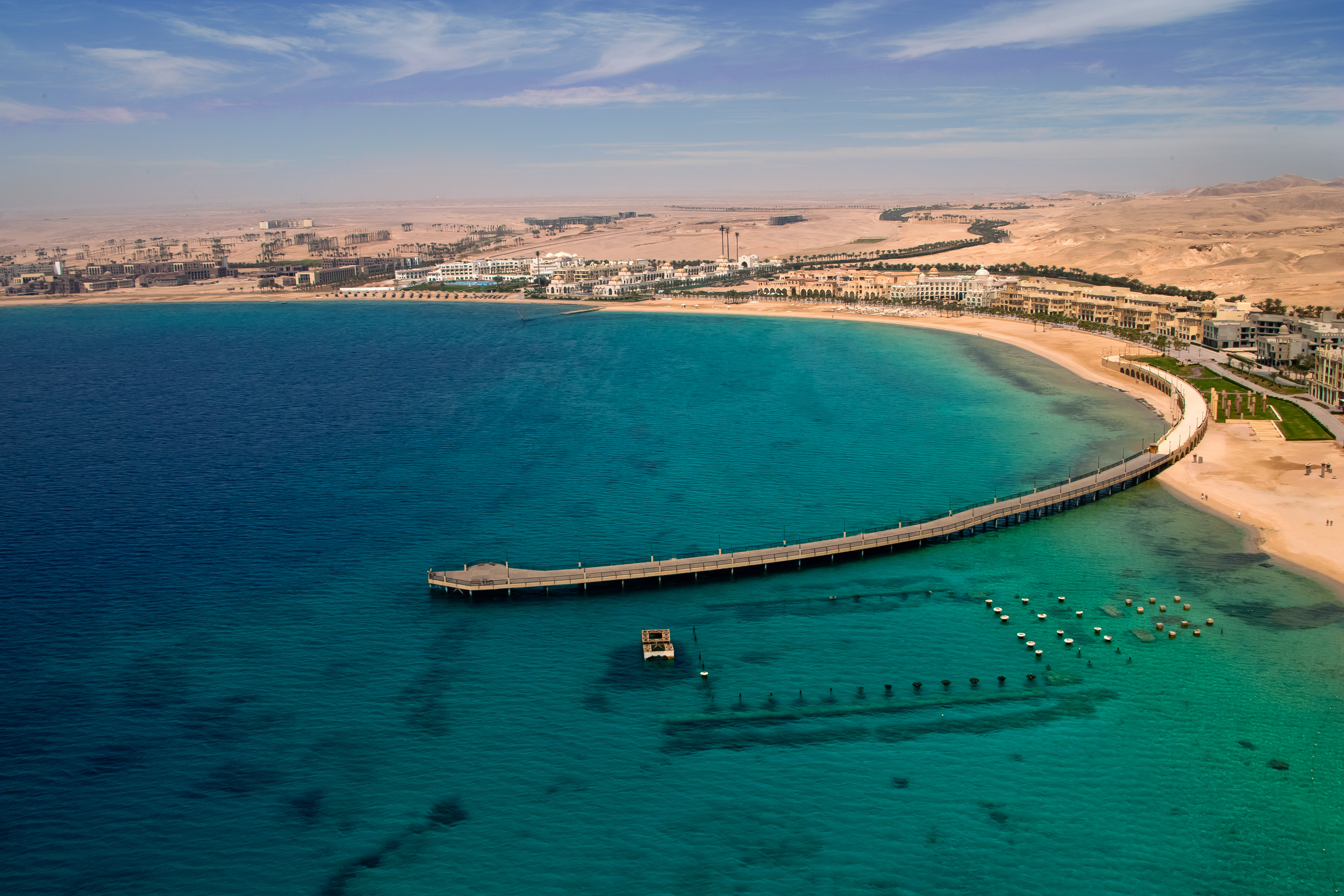
- Overview of Sahl Hasheesh

- Location in Egypt
- Country: Egypt
- Governorate: Red Sea Governorate
- Time zone: UTC+2 (EET)
  - Summer (DST): UTC+3 (EEST)

Sahl Hasheesh (Arabic: سهل حشيش Egyptian Arabic pronunciation: [ˈsæhle ħæˈʃiːʃ]) is a bay located on the Red Sea coast of Egypt, near Hurghada, approximately 18 km south of Hurghada International Airport.

The Sahl Hasheesh Bay is home to a number of islands and coral reefs with diving and snorkeling. The nearby Abou Hasheesh Island is a local protectorate containing a thriving community of marine life.

== Development ==
Development rights to Sahl Hasheesh are held by Egyptian Resorts Company (ERC), who purchased the land in 1995. ERC itself was founded in 1995 and publicly listed in 1999. ERC had a vision of a huge project for this area. Plans for the 12-square mile community were to be completed by 2020. The builder's stated objective was "to create a fully integrated mixed-use resort city, with the aim of achieving long-term economic and environmental sustainability."

The residential units at Old Town and Palm beaches, in Sahl Hasheesh, were completed in 2008 and sold out quickly. Palm Beach Piazza and Family Resort Ocean Breeze are the other residential projects selling apartments and villas in Sahl Hasheesh.

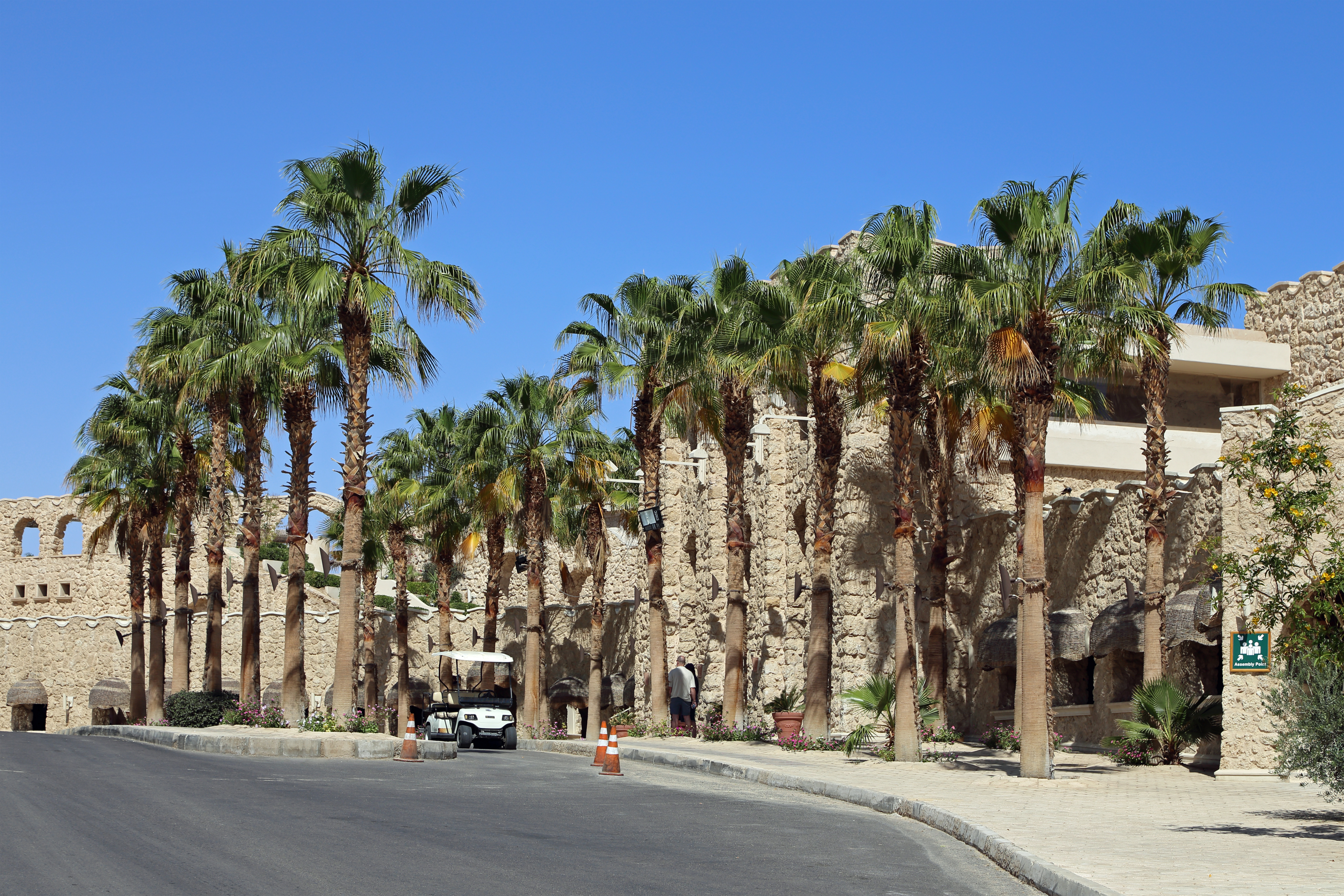
Streets in Sahl Hasheesh

In the resort town, there is a partly submerged artificial city. This artificial reef attracts fish and is popular with tourists, for diving and snorkeling.

In 2009, Oberoi Sahl Hasheesh was rated as one of the more upscale resorts in the Middle East and won first place in Trip Advisors 2016 Travelers Choice Award of top 25 Luxury Hotels in Egypt. Other hotels at the resort were in the top 10 of Hurgada hotels, as well.

In 2015, Bloomberg Financial reported that the developer was struggling to sell its properties and had lost a lot of value in its stock. But in 2016, the developer had a strong financial balance sheet and its hotels were being highly rated by tourists from around the world. In 2016, tourism was returning to pre-revolution levels.

Another developer, Inertia Holdings had projects in Sahl Hasheesh as of 2018.

== Climate ==
The climate of Sahl Hasheesh is characterised by coastal aridity, with hot and dry summers and mild winters. Rainfall amounts are low and infrequent.

Climate data for Hurghada
Month	Jan	Feb	Mar	Apr	May	Jun	Jul	Aug	Sep	Oct	Nov	Dec	Year
Mean daily maximum °C (°F)	21.3 (70.3)	22.2 (72.0)	26.3 (79.3)	27.6 (81.7)	31.3 (88.3)	33.4 (92.1)	33.8 (92.8)	34.2 (93.6)	31.7 (89.1)	29.8 (85.6)	26.4 (79.5)	22.9 (73.2)	28.4 (83.1)
Daily mean °C (°F)	15.5 (59.9)	16.1 (61.0)	20.4 (68.7)	21.7 (71.1)	25.5 (77.9)	28.0 (82.4)	28.7 (83.7)	29.2 (84.6)	26.9 (80.4)	24.6 (76.3)	20.7 (69.3)	17.2 (63.0)	22.9 (73.2)
Mean daily minimum °C (°F)	9.7 (49.5)	10.0 (50.0)	14.5 (58.1)	15.9 (60.6)	19.8 (67.6)	22.7 (72.9)	23.6 (74.5)	24.2 (75.6)	22.2 (72.0)	19.5 (67.1)	15.1 (59.2)	11.5 (52.7)	17.4 (63.3)
Average precipitation mm (inches)	0 (0)	0 (0)	0 (0)	0 (0)	0 (0)	0 (0)	0 (0)	0 (0)	0 (0)	1 (0.0)	1 (0.0)	1 (0.0)	3 (0)
Source: Climate-Data.org

== See also ==
- Red Sea Riviera
- Marsa Alam
- El Gouna
- List of cities and towns in Egypt
