= Makadi Bay =

Resort town in Egypt

Coordinates: 26°59′28″N 33°53′48″E

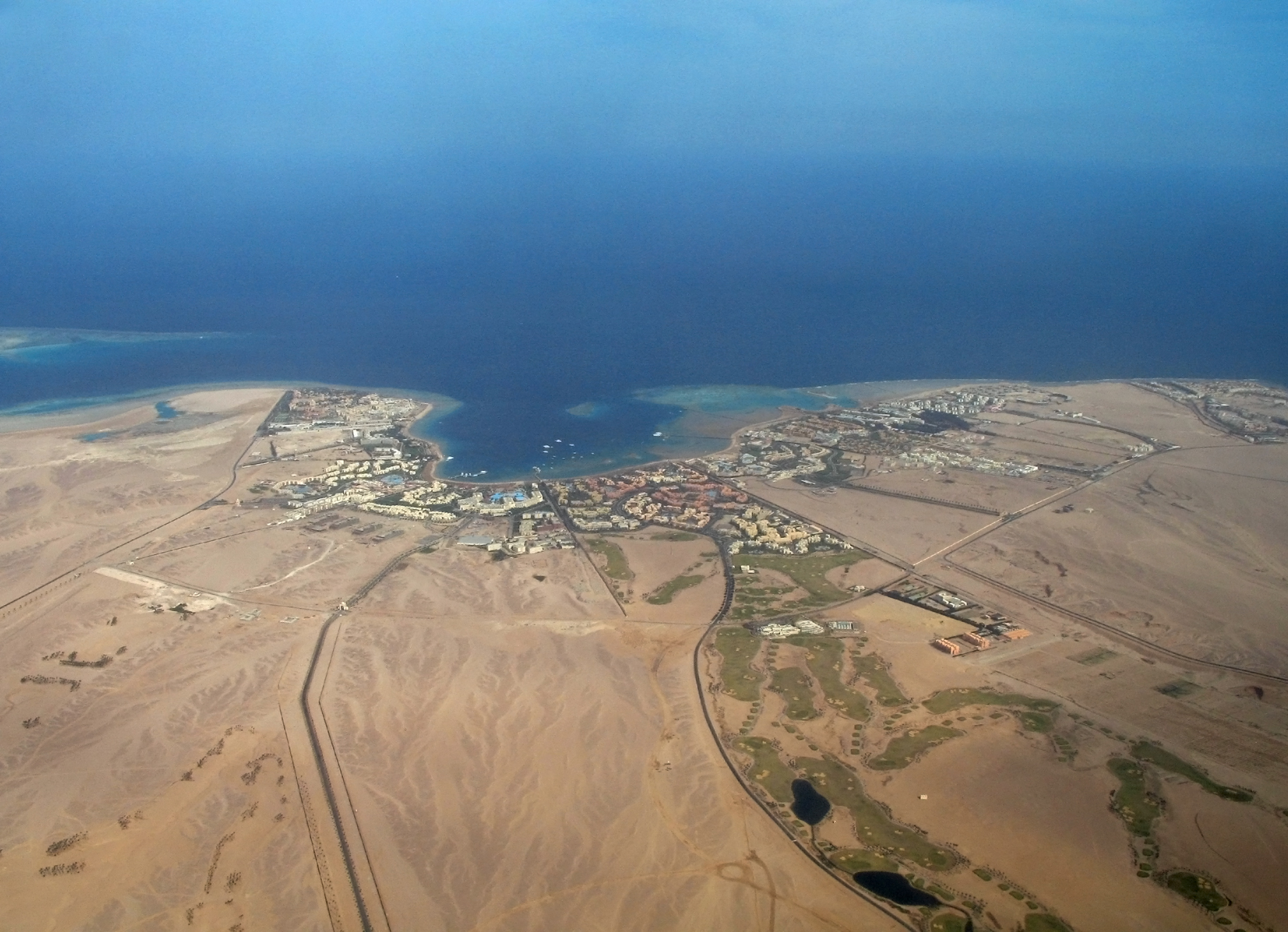
Aerial view of Makadi Bay

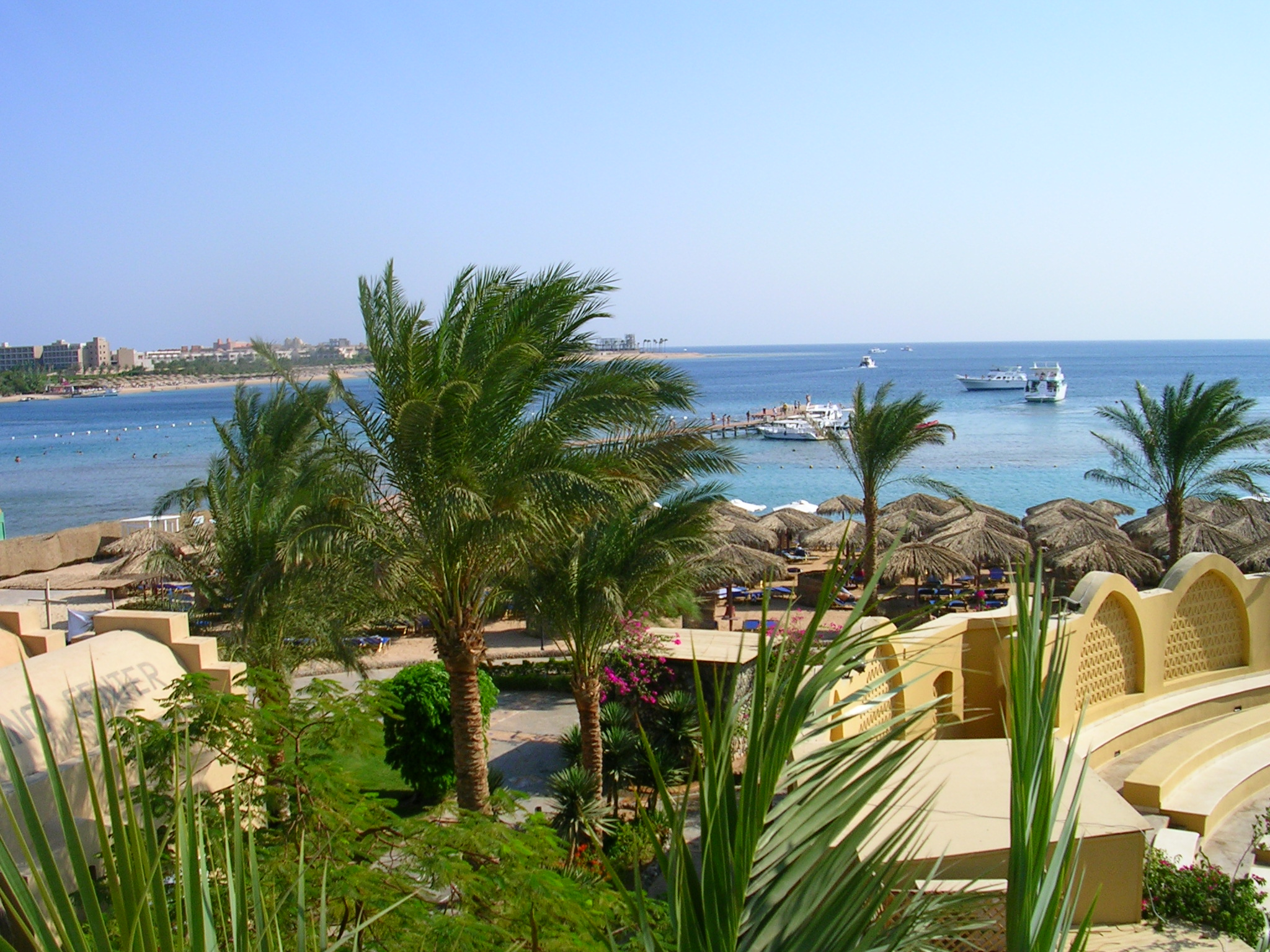
View of a hotel resort at Makadi Bay

Makadi Bay is a resort town in Egypt. It is located about 30 km (19 mi) south of Hurghada on the Red Sea. The resort is surrounded by the Egyptian Eastern Desert.
The bay is known for its sand beaches and crystal-clear water.

== Tourism ==
Makadi Bay is known for its turquoise waters and beautiful desert landscape.

- Red Sea Riviera
