= Hurghada =

Capital of the Red Sea Egyptian Governorate

Hurghada الغردقة
- City
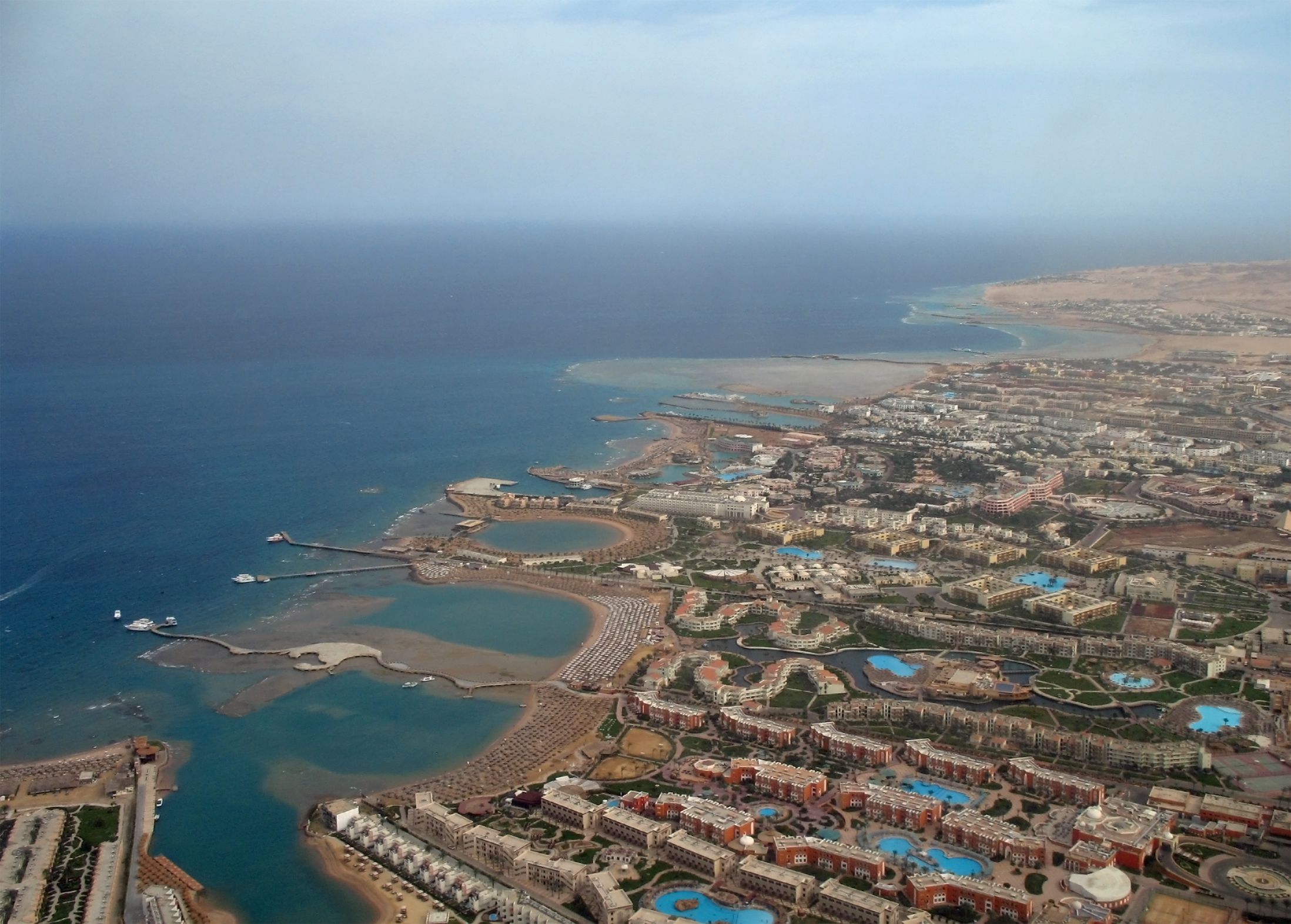
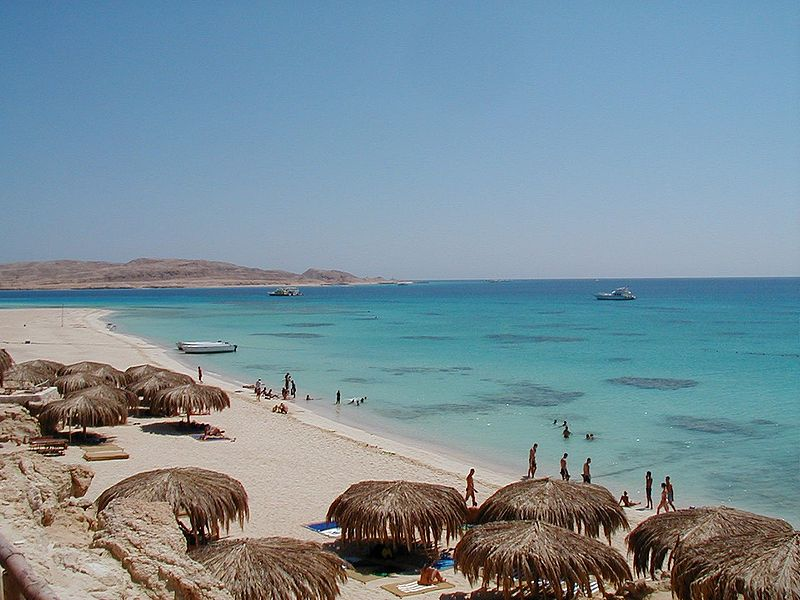
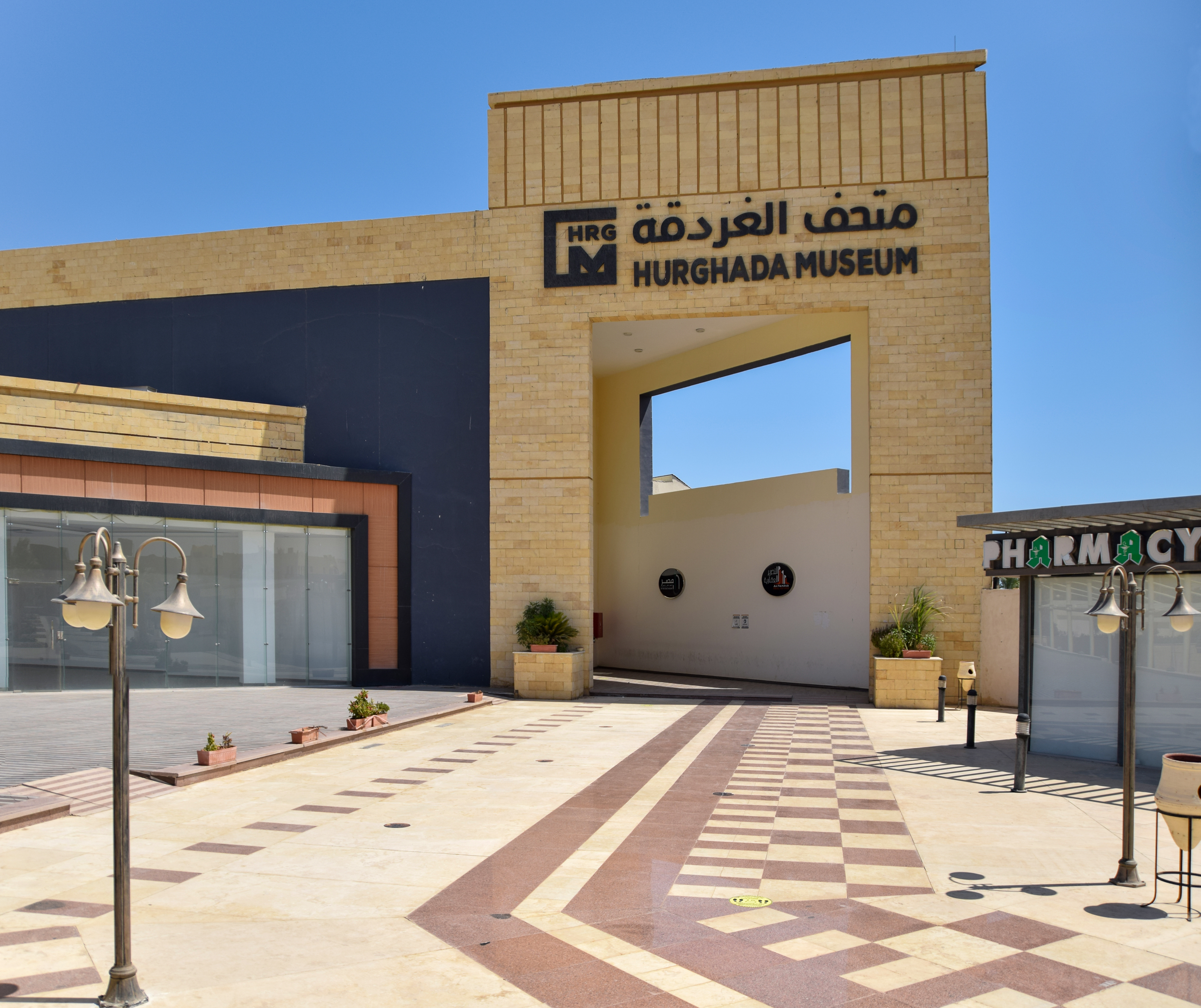
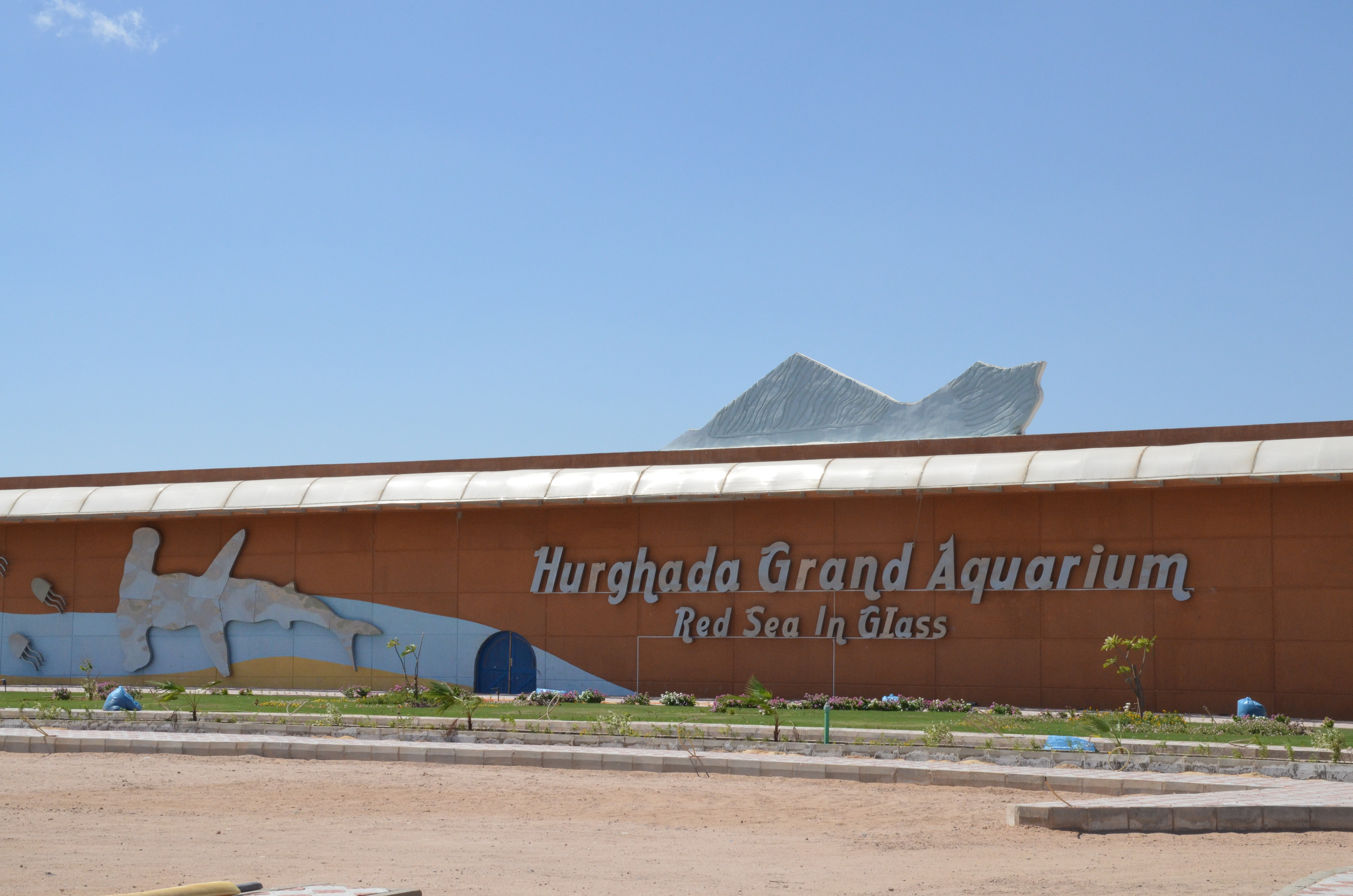
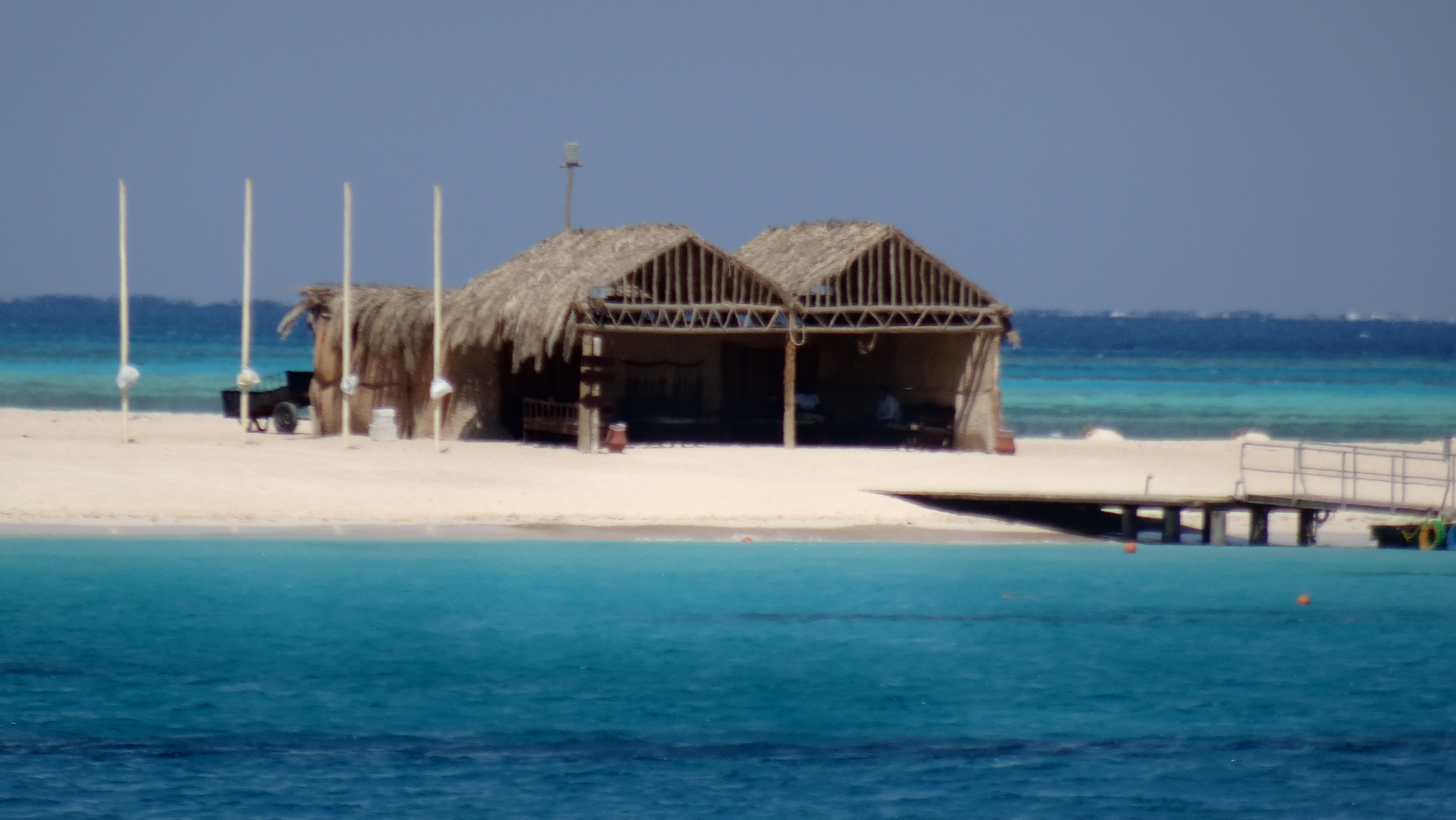
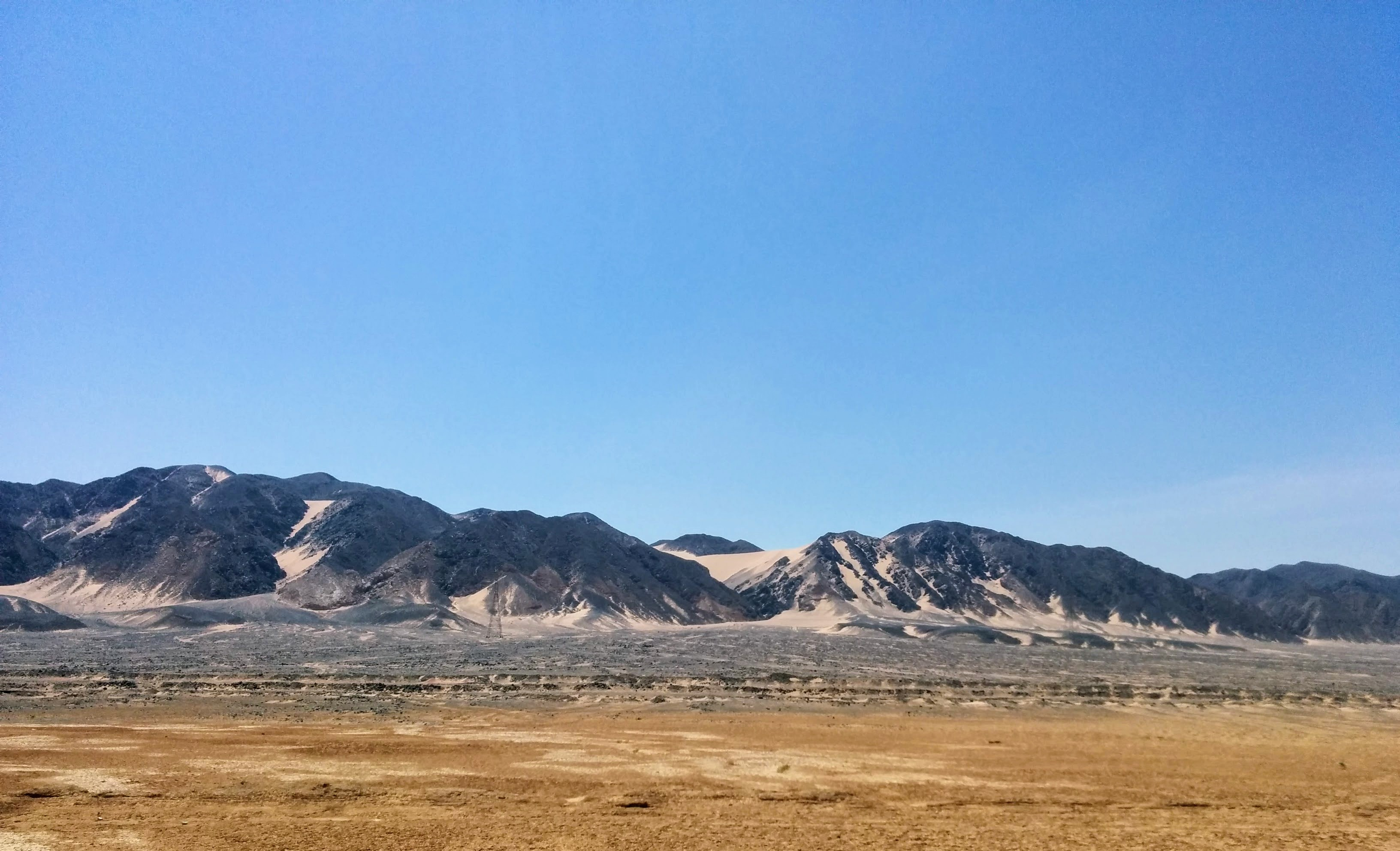
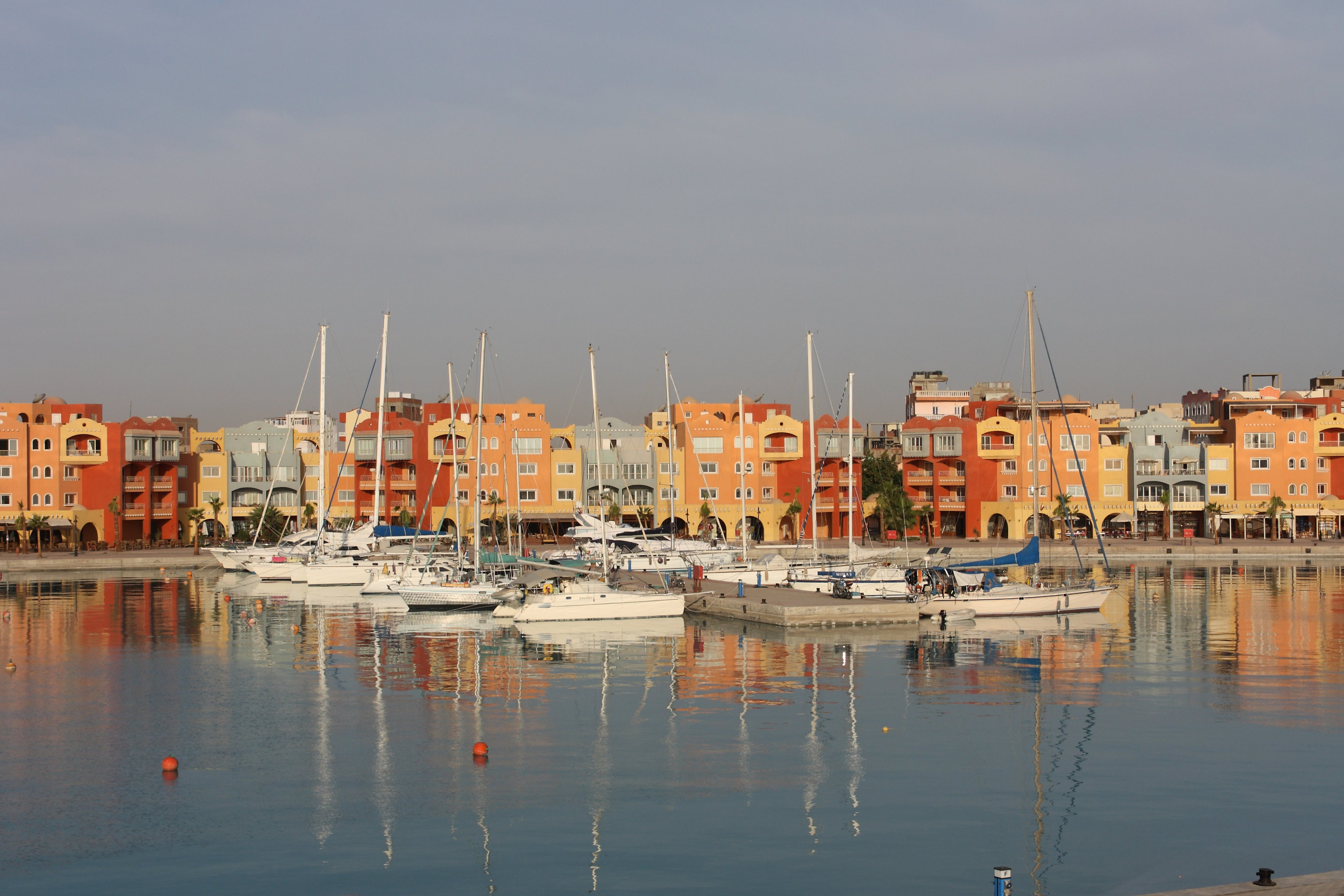
- South Hurghada resorts Red Sea Beaches Hurghada Museum Jungle Aqua Park Hurghada Grand Aquarium Giftun Islands Red Sea Mountains Yacht Marina

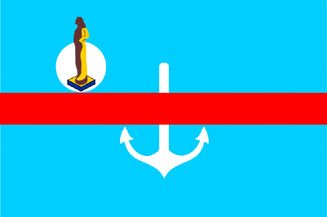
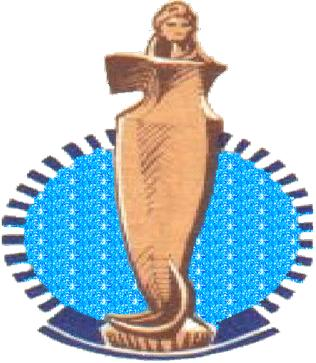
- Flag Seal
- Interactive map of Hurghada
- Location in Egypt
- Coordinates: 27°15′28″N 33°48′42″E
- Country: Egypt
- Governorate: Red Sea
- Founded: 1905

Area
  - Total: 258 km^{2} (100 sq mi)
- Elevation: 11 m (36 ft)

Population (2023)
  - Total: 214,247
  - Density: 830/km^{2} (2,150/sq mi)
- Time zone: UTC+2 (EET)
  - Summer (DST): UTC+3 (EEST)
- Area code: +20 (65)

Hurghada (/hərˈɡædə, -ˈɡɑː-/; Arabic: الغردقة, al-Ġhardaqah, Egyptian Arabic pronunciation: [el ɣæɾˈdæʔæ]) is a coastal city that serves as the largest city and capital of the Red Sea Governorate of Egypt. Hurghada has grown from a small fishing village to one of the largest resort destinations along the Red Sea coast, stretching close to 40 km.

The city is bordered to the north by Ras Gharib, to the south by Safaga, to the east by the Red Sea coast, and to the west by the Red Sea Mountains. The city's nearest airport is Hurghada International Airport. Hurghada contains the islands of Giftun, Umm Qamar, Magawish, Abu Ramada, Abu Minqar, Fanadir, and Shadwan. The Hurghada metropolitan area is home to popular resort cities and towns that include El Gouna, Sahl Hasheesh, Soma Bay, and Makadi Bay. Its main districts are El Dahar, El Saqqala, and El Ahyaa.

The city by itself is famous for its large and luxurious hotels. As of 2024, Hurghada attracts over 9 million visitors annually, making it one of the most visited cities in Egypt and consistently ranking among the world's top tourist destinations and the third best nature destination in the world.

== Etymology ==
The city's name is derived from the Arabic name of the Nitraria plant (Arabic: غرقد, romanized: gharqad) it was shifted into( Arabic: غردق, romanized: ghardaq) due to an influence from the Beja language in the native Ababda tribe's dialect, and from that came (Arabic: غردقة, romanized: ghardaqa). The English Hurghada comes from gharqad (Arabic: غرقد), a variant of the same name. The tree is mentioned in a hadith, where it is called the "tree of the Jews".

== Overview ==
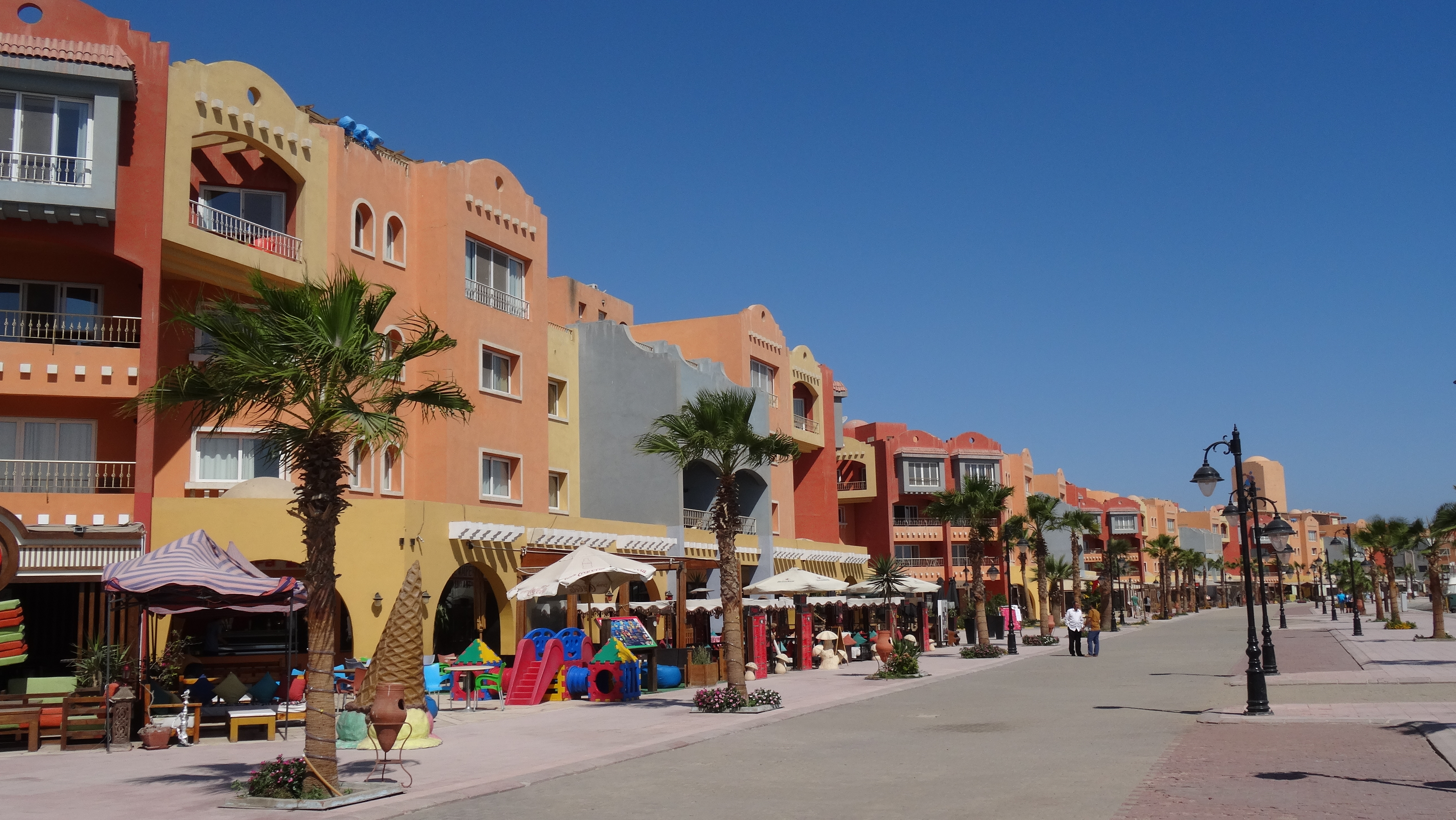
Street in Marina Hurghada

Hurghada was founded in the early 20th century. For many decades it was a small fishing village, but it has grown into a major Red Sea resort as a result of Egyptian and foreign investment that began in the 1980s. Holiday resorts and hotels provide facilities for windsurfing, kitesurfing, yachting, scuba diving and snorkeling. The city is known for its watersports, nightlife and warm weather. Mean daytime temperatures range from the high 20s °C (86 °F) in summer to the high teens (18 °C (64 °F)) in winter, with daytime summer maximums reaching over 35 °C (95 °F).

Hurghada is a popular holiday destination for Egyptian tourists from Cairo, the Delta and Upper Egypt, as well as package holiday tourists from Europe. Some spend Christmas and New Year there.

In recent years, Hurghada has also become a gateway for day trips and excursions to destinations such as Luxor and Cairo offered by various local tour operators.

Hurghada extends for about 36 kilometres (22 mi) along the coast, but does not reach far into the surrounding desert.

Many of Hurghada's newer hotels, restaurants, and shops are located along El Mamsha. Most of the largest hotel resorts are located in the area between Mamsha and Sahl Hasheesh on El Mamsha. Beyond Sahl Hasheesh there are the hotels of Makadi Bay. The oldest part of town is Sakala, settled by Ababda fishermen along its natural harbor, with the traditional bazaar, post office and long-distance bus stations (Go Bus and Upper Egypt Bus) lying in Dahar. The busiest area is also Sakala, the city center on Sheraton Road lined with hotels, shops and restaurants.

== History ==
The Egyptian Red Sea coast has been inhabited since antiquity, with the area of Hurghada being occupied since the 4th century, when the ancient settlement of Abu Sha’ar (Arabic: ابو شعر), located 20 km north of the modern city, was established. Originally founded as a Roman military fort for Ala Nova Maximiana unit between 309-311, it was transformed into a Christian community around 400. The Christians repurposed the fort into a church, leaving behind inscriptions, graffiti, and artifacts such as a 5th-century papyrus and a tapestry with a cross. The settlement declined after either the Sasanian or Arab conquest of Egypt.

The area of modern day Hurghada was settled in as a fishing village by Ababda fishermen along a natural harbor in the Sekalla area in the late 19th century. In 1905 the city was officially established. Oil was discovered in the area in 1913 by Anglo-Egyptian Oilfields Ltd. During the reign of King Farouk a recreational center was built in the city, but after President Nasser's nationalization of Egypt's industries it was reallocated to the Egyptian Armed Forces.

During the War of Attrition between Israel and Egypt (1967–70), Shadwan Island in the Red Sea to the east of the city was fortified by Egyptian troops and used as a radar post. On 22 January 1970 the island was the site of Operation Rhodes, a helicopter assault by Israeli troops who occupied it for 36 hours.

During the October War of 1973, Hurghada harbor was the target of four Israeli operations.

In September 1994, drive-by shooters killed two Egyptians and a German tourist; another German man was wounded in the attack and died of his injuries after returning to Germany.

In 2016, a terrorist attack in Hurghada, inspired by the jihadist group Islamic State, wounded three tourists. In another terrorist attack in Hurghada in 2017, a man declared that he wanted to kill only non-Egyptians, and stabbed seven female tourists. Two German women and one Czech woman were killed in the attack, which took place at two separate resort hotels.

== Tourism ==
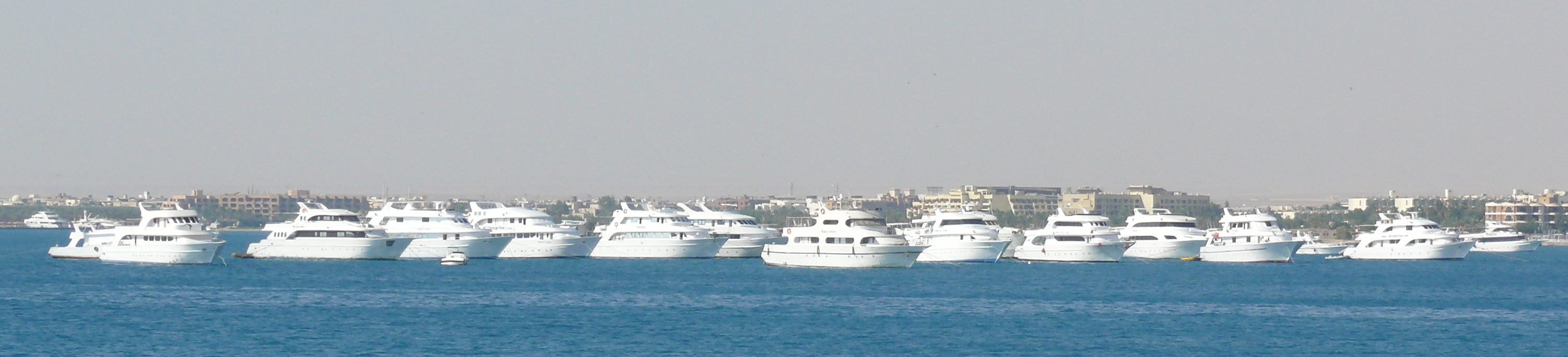
Yacht marina in Hurghada

Hurghada's major industry is foreign and domestic tourism due to its year-round hot and dry climate and long beaches. Its waters are clear and calm for most of the year, making Hurghada a popular destination for underwater diving and snorkelling. Al Mina Mosque with two 40-metre-high minarets is the largest mosque in the Red Sea Governorate. Hurghada Museum is the first antiquities museum in the Red Sea Governorate, containing 2000 artifacts that tell the history of Egypt. Hurghada Grand Aquarium opened in 2015, it is the largest aquarium in Egypt and the second largest in Africa (after uShaka Marine World).

There are diving sites around Giftun Islands, Abu Ramada Island and Fanadir where tourists can see shipwrecks such as the El Mina or the Rosalie Moller. Beyond the town the coast road passes through other holiday resorts and villages.

Tourism in Hurghada has had a negative impact on its coral reefs, as according to a study, the reefs have declined by 50% in three decades. The negative environmental consequences include oil spills, pollution, sewage, and dredging.

== Transport ==
=== Air ===
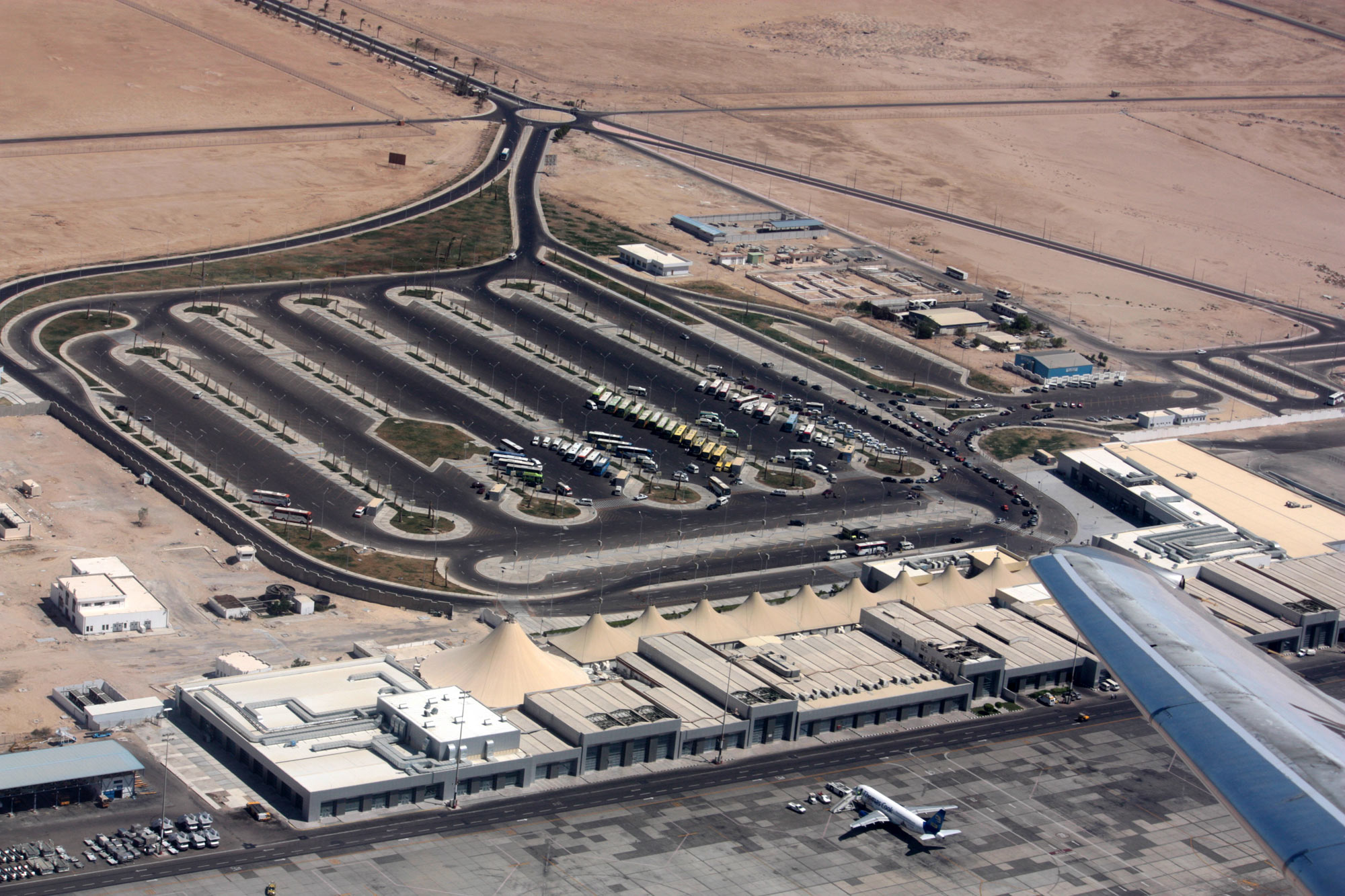
Aerial overview of the city's airport

The city is served by the Hurghada International Airport with scheduled passenger traffic connecting to Cairo and directly to several cities in Europe. It is Egypt's second-busiest airport.

=== Roads ===
Hurghada is 455 kilometres (283 mi) from Cairo and is connected to it by the Hurghada-Sokhna-Cairo road. This road begins in the Katameya district of Cairo, passing through Ain Sokhna. The city is also connected to the cities of Upper Egypt by the (Hurghada/Safaga/Qena/Luxor) road, which is a road with dangerous curves that the Egyptian government is working to develop in order to reduce the high death rate resulting from the numerous accidents that occur on it.

=== Port ===
The port is located on the western coast of the Red Sea, near the entrance to the Gulf of Suez, 370 kilometres (230 mi) south of Suez. The port's importance stems from its strategic location and its service to tourism in the Red Sea Riviera, including yacht tourism, long-distance cruise ship tourism, and maritime shipping lines. Other ports used for petroleum services operate in the Hurghada Metropolitan area are Gabal El-Zait port and power plant, as well as Abu Tig Marina in El Gouna.

== Demographics ==
In June 2015 MK in Egypt publisher Yulia Shevel stated that there were about 20,000 Russians in Hurghada, giving it Egypt's largest Russian population, though only about 3,000 were officially documented. Russian women staying in Hurghada often marry Egyptian men through an urfi (non-shariah) process. The city is also nicknamed Krasnomorsk by Russians, a name modelled on the Red Sea (Krasnoye More in Russian) and Russian city names like Krasnogorsk. Hurghada has 4 schools for Russian children: Constellation (Созвездие), Our Traditions (Наши Традиции), Dina (Дина) and The World of Knowledge (Мир знаний) (the Russian School Hurghada), as well as the newsletter MK in Egypt. In 2017, a Russian Consulate opened in Hurghada.

=== Religious landmarks ===
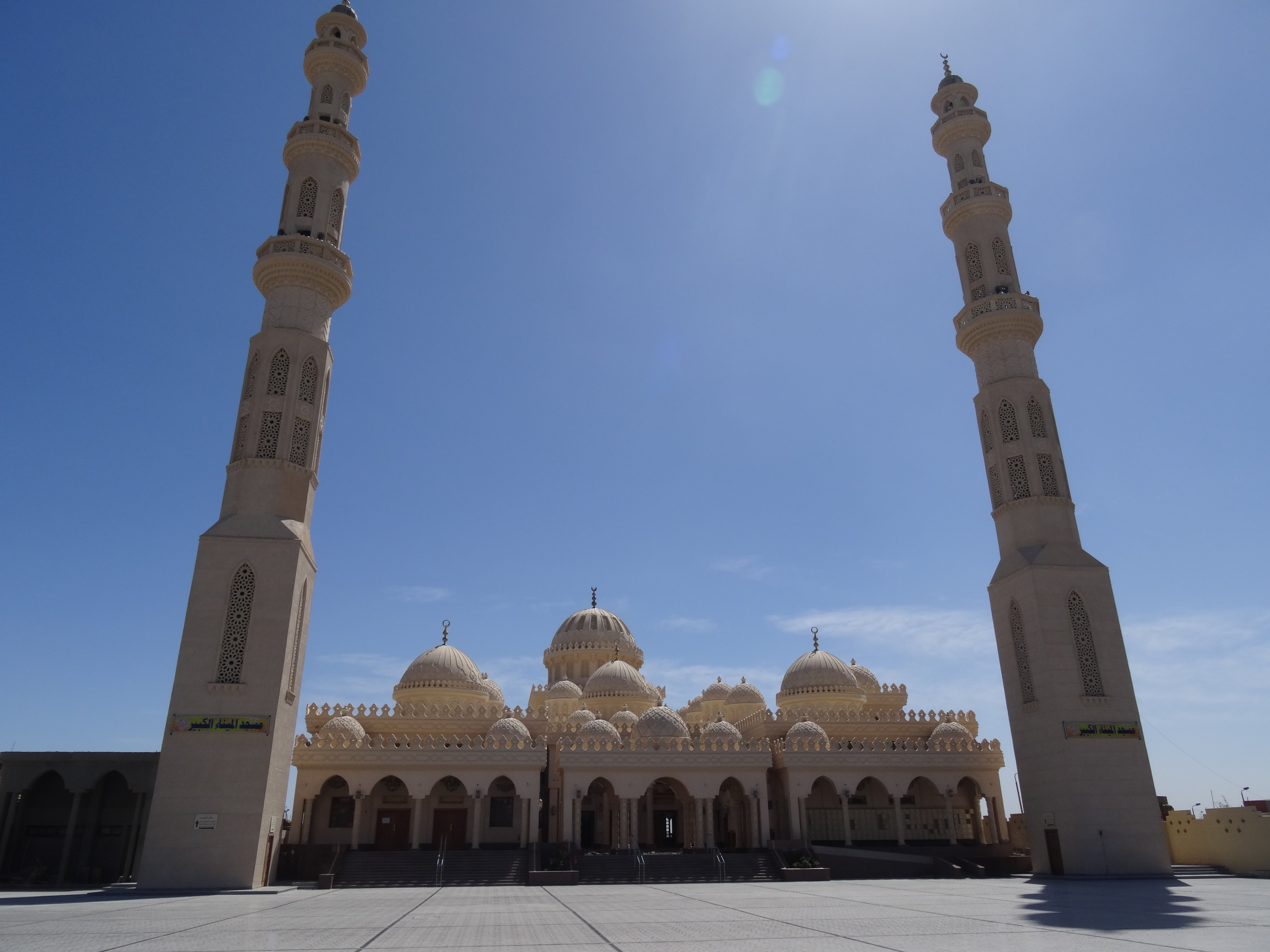
El Mina Mosque

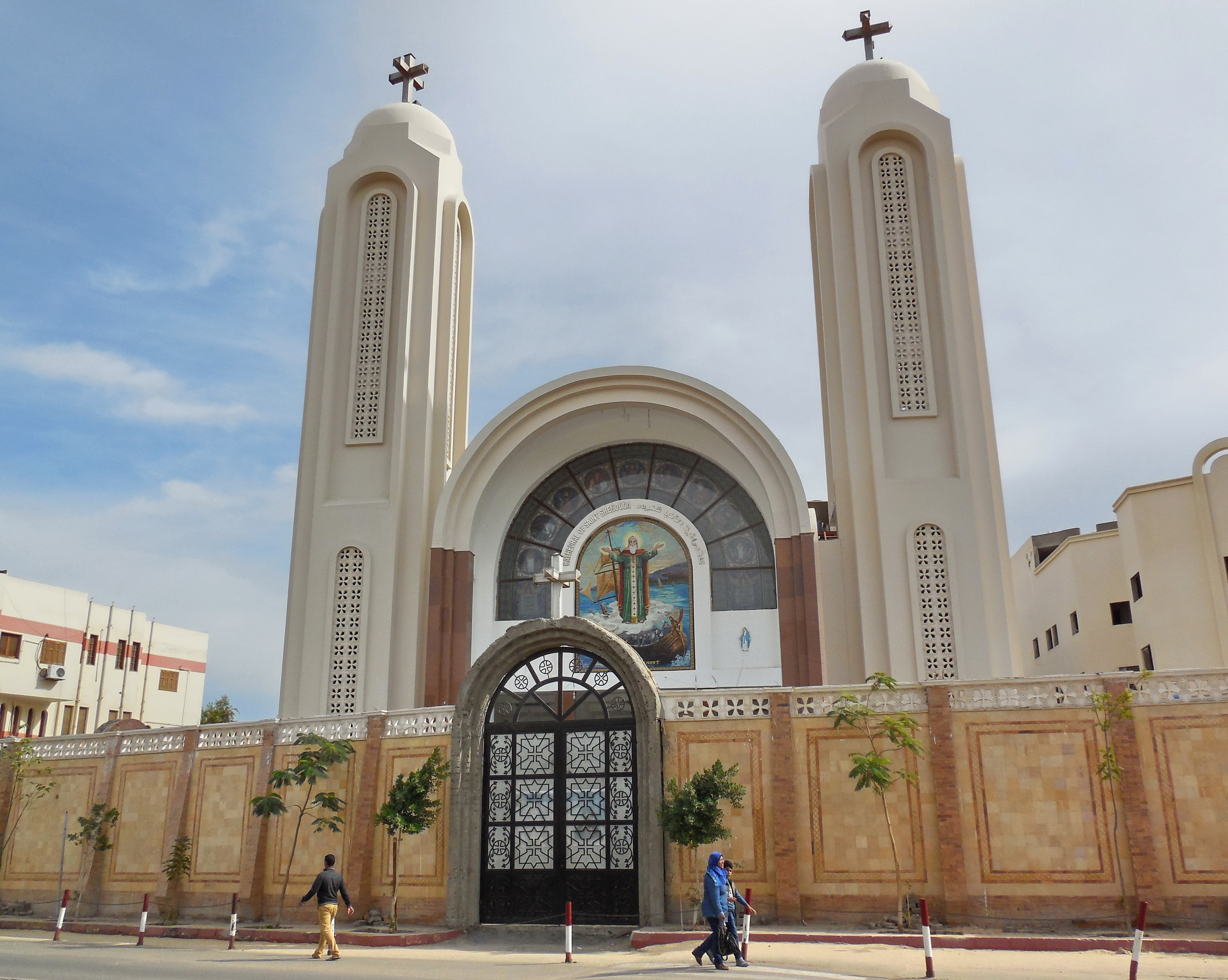
Saint Shenouda Coptic Orthodox Church

El Mina Mosque is the main Islamic landmark in the city of Hurghada, a modern mosque by the marina known for its tall minarets, white domes, marble details, and peaceful prayer hall, offering a glimpse into local Islamic culture and architecture. It is a significant site for both worship and cultural exploration in the city. Other mosques in the city include El Dahar Mosque and Hurghada Mosque. Churches in the city include Saint Shenouda Coptic Orthodox Church. The city also has other churches and a local evangelical community that holds English worship services. St. Takla Church is a Coptic Orthodox church, and Church of the Saint Mary and the Black Moses is a newer church located in the El Kawthar area.

== Climate ==
Hurghada has a subtropical-desert climate (Köppen climate classification: BWh), with mild-warm winters and hot to very hot summers. Temperatures in the period December–January–February are warm, but in the evenings temperature may drop from an average 20 Celsius degrees to 10. November, March and April are comfortably warm. May and October are hot and the period from June to September is very hot. The average annual temperature of the sea is 24 °C (75 °F), ranging from 21 °C (70 °F) in February and March to 28 °C (82 °F) in August.

Climate data for Hurghada (Hurghada International Airport) 1991–2020 normals, extremes 1990–present
Month	Jan	Feb	Mar	Apr	May	Jun	Jul	Aug	Sep	Oct	Nov	Dec	Year
Record high °C (°F)	32.0 (89.6)	34.6 (94.3)	37.9 (100.2)	42.3 (108.1)	45.1 (113.2)	47.0 (116.6)	44.5 (112.1)	46.1 (115.0)	42.1 (107.8)	43.2 (109.8)	38.0 (100.4)	33.9 (93.0)	47.0 (116.6)
Mean daily maximum °C (°F)	22.2 (72.0)	23.5 (74.3)	26.2 (79.2)	29.9 (85.8)	33.7 (92.7)	36.3 (97.3)	37.4 (99.3)	37.5 (99.5)	35.3 (95.5)	32.1 (89.8)	27.8 (82.0)	23.8 (74.8)	30.5 (86.9)
Daily mean °C (°F)	16.6 (61.9)	17.8 (64.0)	20.7 (69.3)	24.4 (75.9)	28.5 (83.3)	31.4 (88.5)	32.7 (90.9)	32.8 (91.0)	30.6 (87.1)	27.0 (80.6)	22.4 (72.3)	18.2 (64.8)	25.3 (77.5)
Mean daily minimum °C (°F)	11.6 (52.9)	12.4 (54.3)	15.1 (59.2)	18.7 (65.7)	23.1 (73.6)	26.1 (79.0)	27.8 (82.0)	28.0 (82.4)	25.6 (78.1)	22.2 (72.0)	17.7 (63.9)	13.4 (56.1)	20.1 (68.2)
Record low °C (°F)	5.9 (42.6)	4.4 (39.9)	9.1 (48.4)	11.6 (52.9)	14.0 (57.2)	17.2 (63.0)	20.8 (69.4)	20.8 (69.4)	19.5 (67.1)	15.9 (60.6)	6.2 (43.2)	2.8 (37.0)	2.8 (37.0)
Average precipitation mm (inches)	0.7 (0.03)	0.5 (0.02)	1.1 (0.04)	0.0 (0.0)	0.0 (0.0)	0.0 (0.0)	0.0 (0.0)	0.0 (0.0)	0.0 (0.0)	2.3 (0.09)	2.2 (0.09)	0.6 (0.02)	7.9 (0.31)
Average precipitation days (≥ 1.0 mm)	0.3	0.0	0.2	0.1	0.0	0.0	0.0	0.0	0.0	0.2	0.1	0.1	0.9
Source 1: NOAA
Source 2: Meteo Climat (records)

Along the Red Sea coast, Hurghada has cooler temperatures in summer.

Climate data for Hurghada 1961–1990
Month	Jan	Feb	Mar	Apr	May	Jun	Jul	Aug	Sep	Oct	Nov	Dec	Year
Record high °C (°F)	28.0 (82.4)	30.7 (87.3)	34.3 (93.7)	41.3 (106.3)	39.4 (102.9)	42.6 (108.7)	40.8 (105.4)	38.6 (101.5)	38.2 (100.8)	38.2 (100.8)	34.4 (93.9)	30.3 (86.5)	42.6 (108.7)
Mean daily maximum °C (°F)	21.2 (70.2)	22.2 (72.0)	24.4 (75.9)	27.6 (81.7)	30.5 (86.9)	32.8 (91.0)	33.3 (91.9)	33.4 (92.1)	31.8 (89.2)	29.6 (85.3)	26.1 (79.0)	21.9 (71.4)	27.9 (82.2)
Daily mean °C (°F)	15.7 (60.3)	16.8 (62.2)	19.3 (66.7)	22.8 (73.0)	26.1 (79.0)	28.9 (84.0)	29.7 (85.5)	29.9 (85.8)	28.0 (82.4)	25.2 (77.4)	21.0 (69.8)	17.1 (62.8)	23.4 (74.1)
Mean daily minimum °C (°F)	10.3 (50.5)	11.1 (52.0)	13.9 (57.0)	18.0 (64.4)	21.5 (70.7)	24.6 (76.3)	26.0 (78.8)	26.2 (79.2)	24.0 (75.2)	20.8 (69.4)	15.9 (60.6)	12.6 (54.7)	18.7 (65.7)
Record low °C (°F)	5.6 (42.1)	5.6 (42.1)	7.5 (45.5)	9.1 (48.4)	13.4 (56.1)	18.8 (65.8)	20.9 (69.6)	20.9 (69.6)	17.0 (62.6)	13.8 (56.8)	9.2 (48.6)	6.0 (42.8)	5.6 (42.1)
Average precipitation mm (inches)	0 (0)	0 (0)	0 (0)	0 (0)	0 (0)	0 (0)	0 (0)	0 (0)	0 (0)	2 (0.1)	2 (0.1)	1 (0.0)	5 (0.2)
Average rainy days	0.1	0.0	0.0	0.0	0.0	0.0	0.0	0.0	0.0	0.1	0.1	0.0	0.3
Average relative humidity (%)	48	46	46	43	42	41	45	46	48	53	51	51	46.7
Average dew point °C (°F)	4.8 (40.6)	5.2 (41.4)	7.2 (45.0)	9.9 (49.8)	11.9 (53.4)	14.2 (57.6)	16.3 (61.3)	16.8 (62.2)	16.1 (61.0)	14.8 (58.6)	10.7 (51.3)	6.9 (44.4)	11.2 (52.2)
Mean monthly sunshine hours	265.7	277.6	274.3	285.6	317.4	348.0	352.3	322.4	301.6	275.2	263.9	246.7	3,530.7
Source: NOAA

Hurghada mean sea temperature
Jan	Feb	Mar	Apr	May	Jun	Jul	Aug	Sep	Oct	Nov	Dec
22 °C (72 °F)	21 °C (70 °F)	21 °C (70 °F)	22 °C (72 °F)	24 °C (75 °F)	26 °C (79 °F)	27 °C (81 °F)	28 °C (82 °F)	27 °C (81 °F)	26 °C (79 °F)	25 °C (77 °F)	23 °C (73 °F)

== Resorts near Hurghada ==
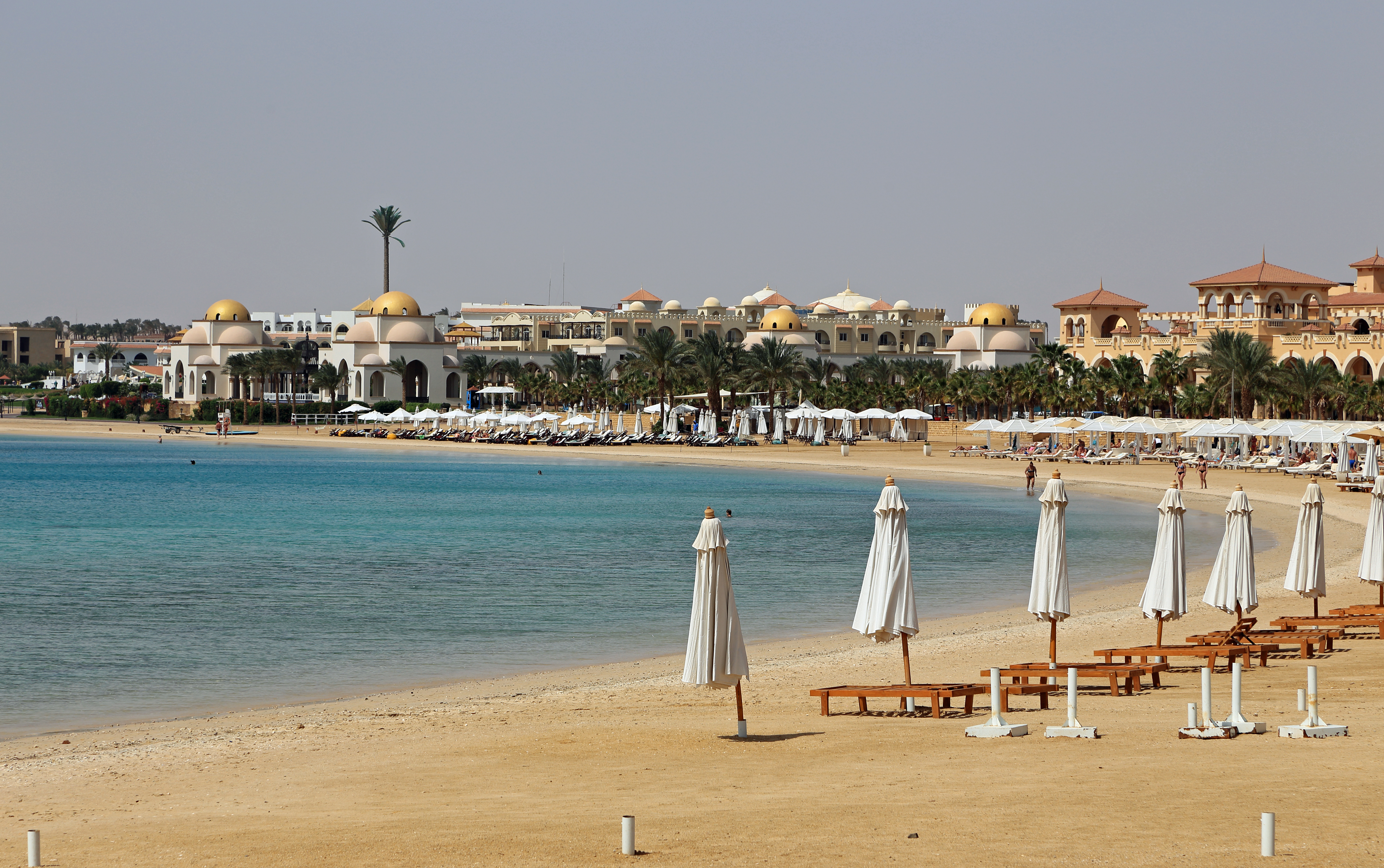
Sahl Hasheesh

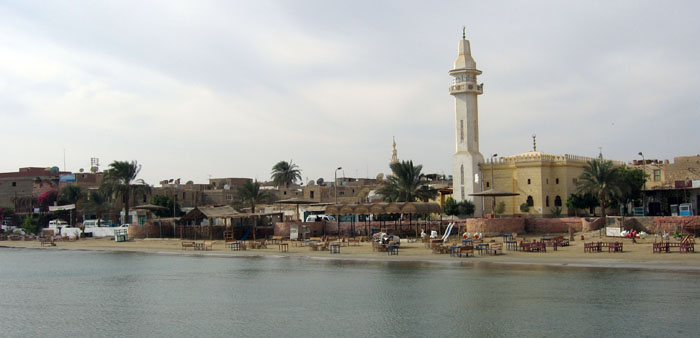
El Qoseir

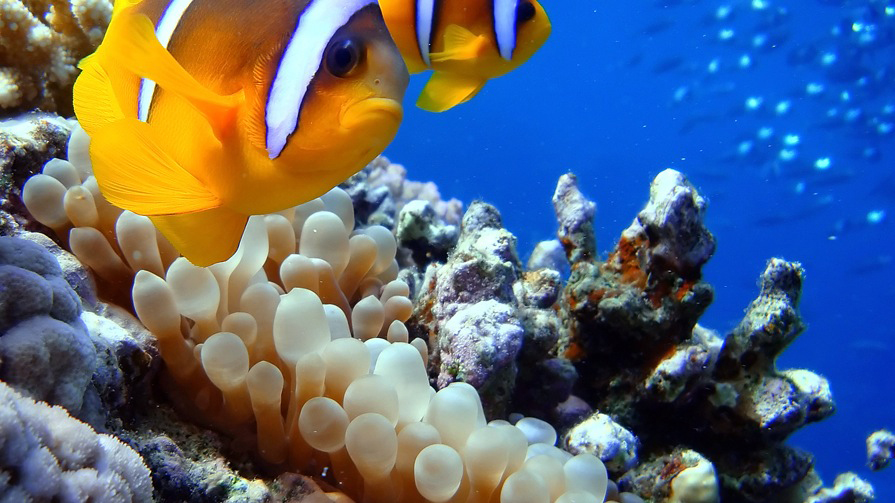
Anemone and clownfish at Sharm El Naga beach

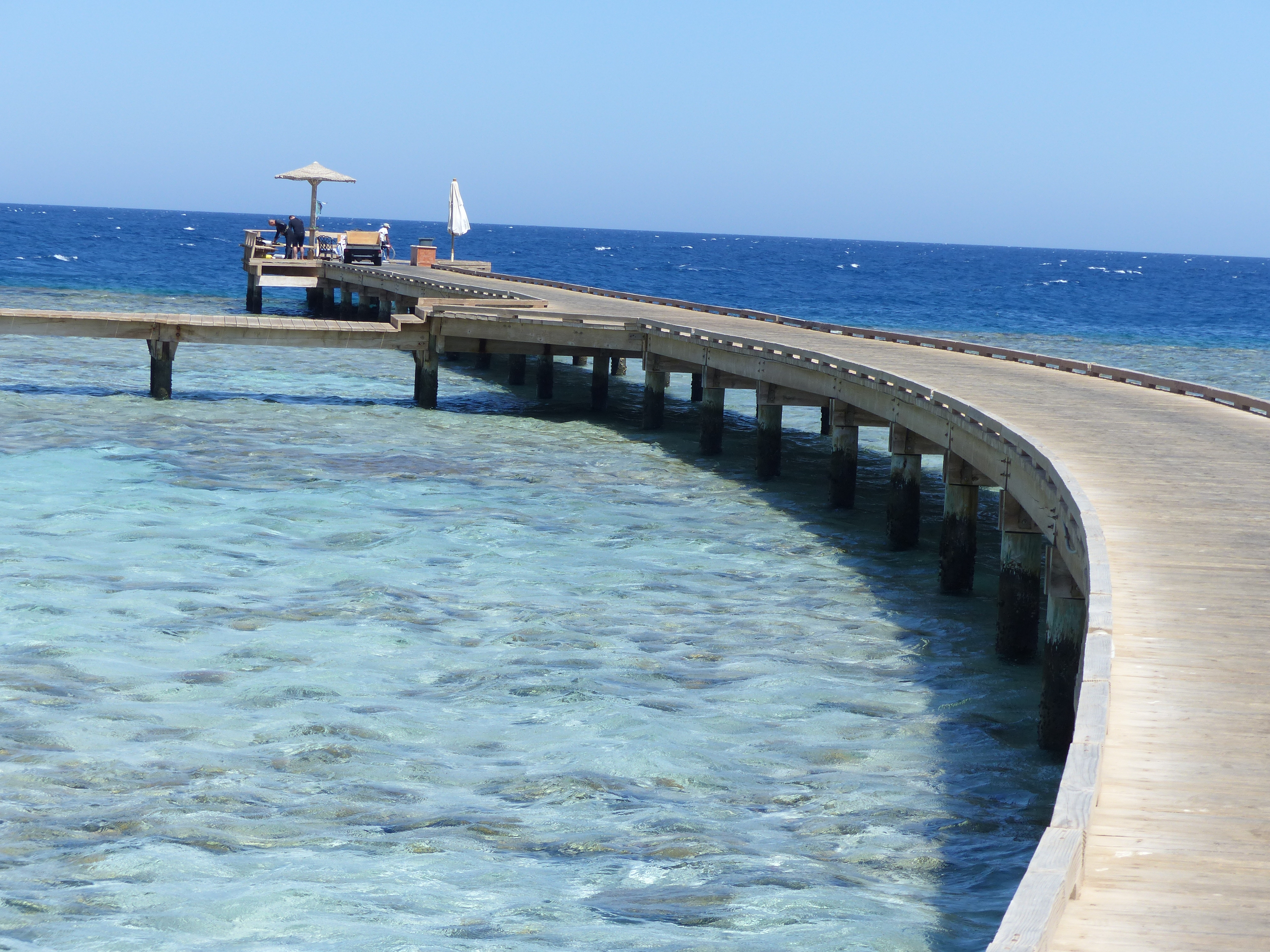
Soma Bay

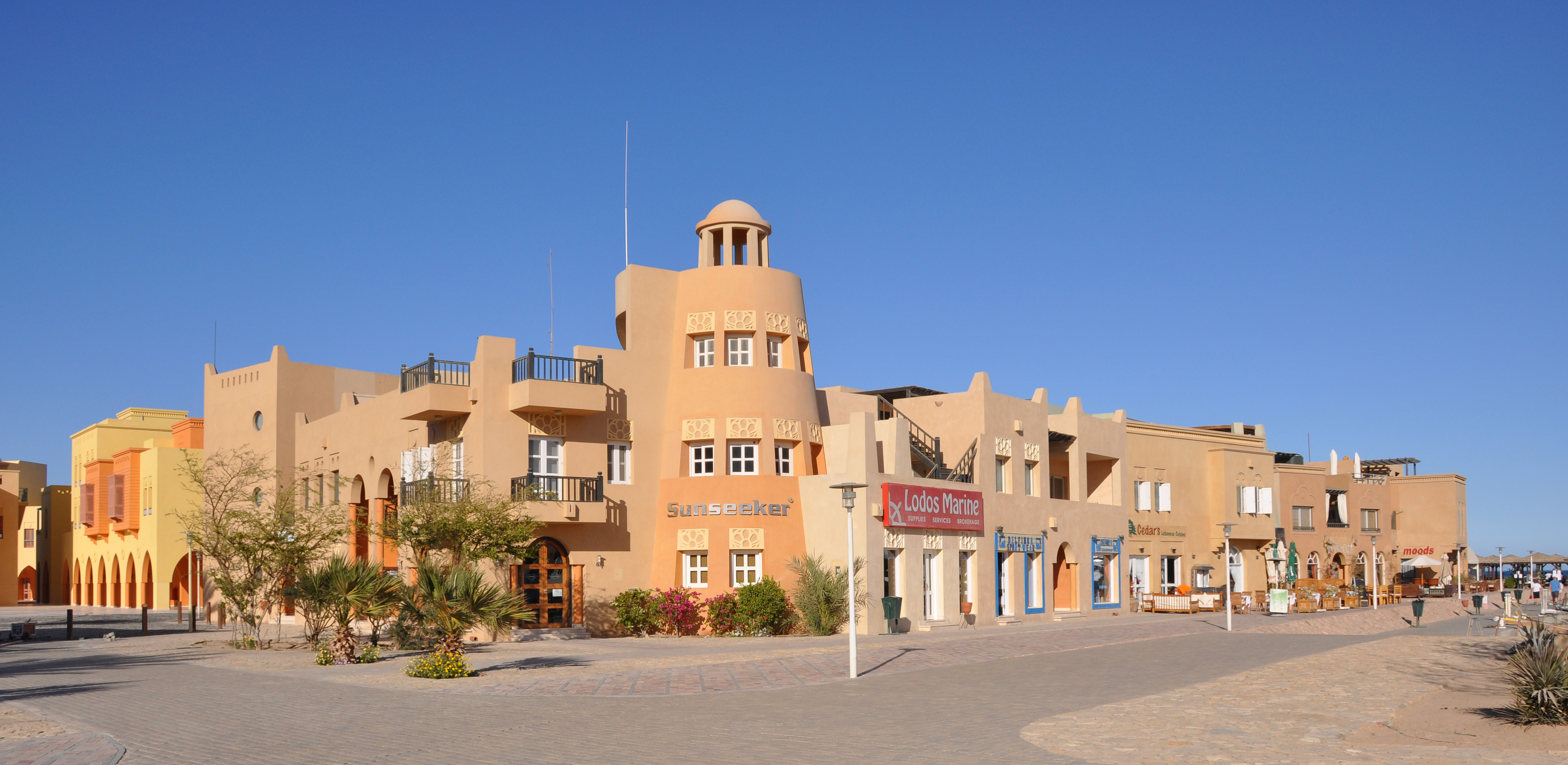
El Gouna

=== Sahl Hasheesh ===
Sahl Hasheesh is a newly developed resort located 18 kilometres (11 mi) south of Hurghada on the Red Sea. It has clear long descending seas and is home to diverse marine life around artificial underwater walls.

=== El Qoseir ===
El Qoseir is one of the Egyptian gateways, and one of the oldest cities on the western coast of the Red Sea. In the past it was known by various names, such as Thagho in the pharonic period, Leucos Limen (white port in Greek) in the Hellenistic and Ptolemaic period, and Myos Hormos in the Roman period. In the Islamic period it was given the name El Qoseir, which means "a small palace or fortress".

Located between Hurghada and Marsa Alam, El Qoseir used to be an important port. Many people traveled from there to the Land of Punt to buy ivory, leather and incense. During the Ottoman and the Islamic periods, Egyptians and Muslims from North Africa traveled from El Qoseir as pilgrims to Mecca. It was also the only port importing coffee from Yemen. During the French occupation of Egypt, El Qoseir was the arrival point for Arabs and Muslims from Hejaz coming to fight beside the Mamluk against the French army. The most important sites in El Qoseir are the fort and the water reservoir. The water reservoir was El Qoseir's only source of drinking water 100 years ago.

El Qoseir El Adima, the city's historic area, was once a Roman port and hundreds of amphora and old pottery artefacts have been found there. There are several 300-year-old buildings in the area, including an Ottoman fort and a number of historic mosques: El Farran, El Qenawi and El Senousi. The police station is also located at a historic site. The area contains bazaars, cafes, coffee shops and restaurants selling sea food.

=== Makadi Bay ===
A tourist resort located 30 kilometres (19 miles) south of Hurghada containing only hotels, shops, and clubs. There are no settlements with locals. The place features a good sandy beach.

=== Sharm El Naga ===
A village, around 40 kilometres (25 miles)} south of Hurghada. Its beach contains a beautiful reef cliff.

=== Soma Bay ===
Soma Bay A tourist resort situated 45 kilometres (28 miles)} south of Hurghada, with various hotels including Palm Royale Soma Bay, La Residence des Cascades, Robinson Club, Sheraton (Kempinski – opening August 2008) & Caribbean World Resort Soma Bay (opened December 7).

=== El Gouna ===
A privately owned luxury hotel town, about 25 kilometres (16 miles) north of Hurghada. Quiet and clean, the town consists of several islands separated by channels and connected by bridges. Besides 14 hotels and 3 marinas, there are also 2,200 private villas and apartments, while many more are under construction. It is promoted by some as Egypt's Venice. It is built on 10 kilometres (6 miles) of beachfront and has unique and diverse architecture.

El Gouna provides diving and watersports centers, horse stables, go-karting, shopping arcades, bazaars, a wide selection of restaurants and bars, night clubs, an internet cafe, four bank branches, many automated teller machines (ATMs), two pharmacies, the El Gouna international school, El Gouna national school, a nursery, a private hospital, three marinas, a library, an airport, one of several casinos on the Red Sea coast, a private radio station, a post office, a museum, real estate offices and an 18-hole golf course designed by Gene Bates with a unique aqua driving range.

=== El Mahmya ===
A tourist beachfront camp on the protected Giftun island, 45 minutes by boat from Hurghada.

== Education ==
Universities include Qena University (Hurghada branch) Other universities in the city include Hurghada University, an independent university with a range of faculties and programs.

International schools include:

- German School Hurghada
- Russian School Hurghada
- French School of Hurghada
- Sunrise International School
- MES International School Hurghada

== See also ==
- Marsa Alam
- Red Sea Riviera
- List of cities and towns in Egypt
