= Wadi Hammamat =

Dry river bed and ancient quarry in Egypt

- The entrance to Wadi Hammamat (in the background) seen from Bir el-Fawakhir

- Location within Egypt
- Floor elevation: 320 metres (1,050 ft)–400 metres (1,300 ft)
- Length: 6 kilometres (3.7 mi)
- Width: 100 metres (330 ft)

Geology
- Type: Wadi

Geography
- Country: Egypt
- Governorate: Qena/Red Sea
- Coordinates: 25°58′59″N 33°33′55″E
- Mountain range: Red Sea Hills
- Traversed by: Route 256
- River: None
- Interactive map of Wadi Hammamat

Wadi Hammamat (Arabic: وادي الحمامات, meaning "valley of the baths") is a wadi in the Eastern Desert, located about 110 kilometres east of Qena in Egypt. Known since the beginnings of pharaonic civilization, Wadi Hammamat was exploited for its gold mines and, above all, for its greywacke quarries, known as "Bekhen stone", for millennia. In addition, the wadi had a strategic position because it provided access to the caravan route from Coptos to the Red Sea, the most direct route between the Nile Valley and the Red Sea, hence its ancient Egyptian name Rô-hanou ("outlet of the waters").

== Description ==
=== Geography ===
Wadi Hammamat is a wadi in the Red Sea Hills, in the Eastern Desert of Egypt. It is located 80 kilometres from the Nile Valley directly east of Qift. The present name was given by European explorers during the 19th century after the name of the well located in the valley (Bir el-Hammamat). Before that, the wadi was known by local inhabitants as Wadi el-Kafr, while only the well bore the name Hammamat.

Map of Wadi Hammamat.

Wadi Hammamat forms a six-kilometre-long natural gorge between the mountains of Jabal el-Hammamat to the west, Jabal Rasfah to the north, Jabal Shahimiyyah to the south, and Jabal el-Sid to the east (the "mountain of silver and gold" of the ancient Egyptians). The two ends of the wadi are Bir el-Hammamat, to the west (25°58′07″N 33°32′49″E), and Bir el-Fawakhir, to the east (26°00′45″N 33°36′08″E). Since Wadi Hammamat lies in the western part of the Arabian Mountain Range, within the drainage basin of the Nile, it naturally slopes from east to west. Bir el-Fawakhir is located 400 metres above sea level and Bir el-Hammamat at 320 metres. Bir el-Hammamat marks the intersection of Wadi Hammamat with Wadi Um Had, while Bir el-Fawakhir marks the intersection of Wadi Hammamat with Wadi Fawakhir to the northeast and Wadi el-Sid to the southeast. Wadi Hammamat also meets other valleys along its length: Wadi Attala (26°00′37″N 33°35′15″E) and Wadi Masaq el-Baqr (26°00′03″N 33°34′43″E) to the north, and Wadi el-Chagg to the south (25°58′17″N 33°33′21″E).

=== Geology ===
Quarry face in the greywacke of Wadi Hammamat.

From a geological point of view, Wadi Hammamat consists of different geological formations, which account for the great variety of colours found on the rocks of the valley.

- Hammamat siliciclastic rock (Late Precambrian). This formation includes three types of siliciclastic sedimentary rocks: greywacke (a variety of sandstone that is greenish-grey and occasionally dark grey or purplish-grey), slaty mudstone (shades of purple, green and grey), and green breccia (a conglomerate of pebbles and stones—mainly fragments of igneous rock—embedded in a greenish-grey matrix). These three varieties of rock are slightly metamorphosed. From a distance, they all appear dark brownish-grey.
- Nubian Sandstone (Late Cretaceous). This formation contains a light-brown type of sandstone that is subject to desert varnish.
- Fawakhir granite (Late Precambrian). This formation contains light-grey to pinkish-grey granite, crossed by abundant quartz veins. These veins often contain mineralization of gold and sulfides, including silver. From a distance, this rock ranges in colour from pink to pale red, with the quartz veins stained reddish-brown by the oxidation of the minerals.
- Atalla serpentinite (Late Precambrian). This formation includes serpentinite (dark green and dark grey mottled) and some slightly metamorphosed gabbro (dark greenish-grey). These rocks appear pinkish-brown when viewed from a distance due to weathering. Some gold- and sulfide-bearing quartz veins of the Fawakhir granite extend into the Atalla serpentinite.
- Dokhan volcanic rocks (Late Precambrian). This formation includes rhyolitic tuff (light brown) and, to a lesser extent, andesite and basalt (dark grey). These rocks may be slightly metamorphosed. Viewed from a distance, they appear pinkish-brown due to weathering.

The Hammamat siliciclastic rocks are by far the dominant formation and form the core of the valley (hence its name), while the other formations are found mainly at its extremities. Gold-bearing rocks occur at the eastern end of the valley and farther east in the mountains, in Wadi Fawakhir and Wadi el-Sid. This is why Wadi Hammamat was primarily exploited as a quarry, while gold mining was concentrated in Wadi Fawakhir and Wadi el-Sid. Modern estimates range from 1.7 to 9 grams of gold per tonne of ore at Wadi Fawakhir and from 4 to 28 grams per tonne at Wadi el-Sid. The ore extracted at Wadi el-Sid has a precious metal content of 80% gold and 20% silver.

=== Coptos–Myos Hormos road ===
In addition to providing access to the mines of Wadi Fawakhir and Wadi el-Sid, Wadi Hammamat has been part since antiquity of an important communication route between the Nile Valley and the Red Sea. This route crossed the Arabian Mountain Range from west to east, from Coptos (modern Qift) to the port of Myos Hormos (modern El Qoseir). The route was called Hodos Myshormitikè during the Hellenistic and Roman periods. Nowadays, the entire route is often referred to for convenience as the Wadi Hammamat road, because the wadi marks the beginning of the route through the mountains. In reality, Wadi Hammamat represents only a small portion of a few kilometres of a total route 183 kilometres long.

The road to Myos Hormos.

From Qift (Coptos), the route runs through a series of low-altitude wadis, including Wadi el-Matula, Wadi Rod 'Ayid and Wadi Kwei, passing through the sites of El-Matula, Laqeita (Phoinikôn), Qasr el Banat and El-Muwayh (Krokodilô). The route then continues into the mountains through Wadi Hammamat and then Wadi el-Fawakhir. The road continues eastward and crosses the most difficult part of the route: the El Rieh Pass, located 534 metres above sea level and marking the drainage divide between the drainage basin of the Nile and that of the Red Sea. The route then passes through El-Zarqa (Maximianon) and reaches the long Wadi Abu Ziran. Wadi Abu Ziran passes through El-Hamra and then turns north, crossing several higher mountains including Jabal Umm 'Aradah, Jabal Ba'anib and Jabal al-Murr. After Bir Sayyala, the route turns sharply right towards the southeast. The road continues through Wadi el-Haramiya, passing along Jabal Dawwi to the north. The route passes through El-Iteima (Dawwi) and then turns east at Bir Beidah. The road continues east through Wadi Ambagi and then Wadi Quseir el-Qadim, finally reaching El Qoseir (Myos Hormos).

This route is one of the most direct and least difficult routes between the Nile Valley and the sea. It is relatively easy because it passes through wadis with flat floors and compacted sand and gravel surfaces. The route avoids high-altitude passages (only one pass, at just 500 metres elevation) and the passages between the valleys present no particular difficulty. The journey has been calculated at six days, for a total of 33 hours of walking, which corresponds fairly well to the account of Strabo in the 1st century BC.

=== Rock inscriptions ===
In addition to its importance as a quarry and caravan route, Wadi Hammamat is also remarkable for its enormous corpus of rock inscriptions. Approximately 750 inscriptions have been found in the valley, including texts and images. They include official and religious inscriptions as well as graffiti, written in hieroglyphs, hieratic, Demotic or Ancient Greek, either carved or painted directly onto the rock. The inscriptions date from all periods of ancient Egypt, from the Early Dynastic Period of Egypt. Most of the inscriptions are concentrated around the main greywacke quarry (25°59′36″N 33°34′16″E): the "mountain of Bekhen" or "pure mountain".

Petroglyphs of Wadi Hammamat

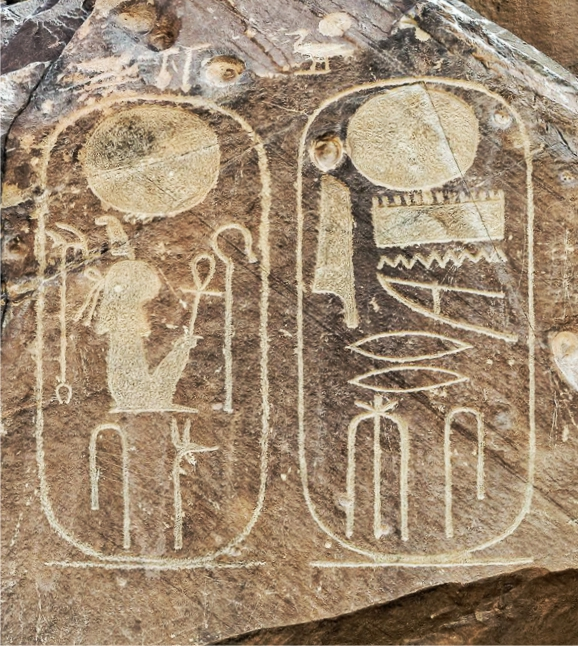

== History ==
=== Under pharaonic administration ===
The stone quarries of Wadi Hammamat remained in operation almost continuously throughout ancient Egypt. Numerous remains of quarrying activity and rock inscriptions have been discovered at the site. Among these texts are highly detailed reports of expeditions, carved in Egyptian hieroglyphs on the rock of the wadi, as well as prayers and thanksgiving addressed to the deities, most often to the triad of Coptos: Min, Isis and Horus, with Min being the patron deity of Coptos and protector of caravan routes and long-distance expeditions.

Quarrying activity at Wadi Hammamat began 6,000 years ago, during the Pre-Dynastic period. The earliest known use of greywacke and slate from the valley was for the manufacture of stone objects (cosmetic palettes, balls, bracelets and stone vessels) during the Pre-Dynastic period and the First Dynasty of Egypt. During the Old Kingdom, greywacke from the quarries of Wadi Hammamat began to be used for large-scale elements such as ornamental statues, steles and sarcophaguses. From this period onward, pharaohs organized large expeditions to Wadi Hammamat to gather resources in the wadi or farther toward the Red Sea. Old Kingdom expeditions could already involve thousands of men, as during the height of the New Kingdom. The Old Kingdom also saw the beginning of gold mining in the valleys surrounding Wadi Hammamat.

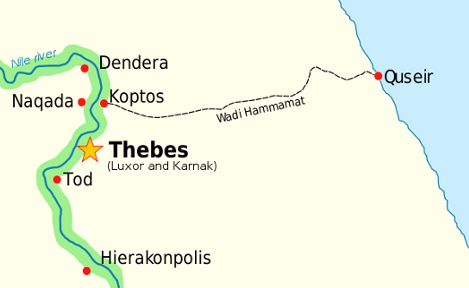
Route to the Red Sea through Wadi Hammamat.

During the Old Kingdom, Wadi Hammamat became an essential route to the Red Sea through the Eastern Desert from Coptos. The route provided access to the galena mines of Gebel Zeit and to the Land of Punt via the Red Sea. Coptos lies on the bend made by the Nile eastward around Qena, and therefore at the point where the Nile is closest to the sea. The city consequently became a major departure point for expeditions to the Red Sea. Coptos had shipyards where boat components were manufactured, transported to the coast and assembled on site. Nevertheless, throughout the pharaonic period (before the Ptolemaic period), there was only one permanent port on the Red Sea coast in southern Egypt: Saww (modern Mersa Gawasis). Although passage through Wadi Hammamat to reach the port of Mersa Gawasis from Coptos is attested by a historical source, it was probably not the usual route. The most direct access to Mersa Gawasis was through Wadi Qena, which saved several days of travel compared with Wadi Hammamat. The Wadi Hammamat route therefore probably led instead to one of the intermittent ports on the coast, around El Qoseir, where the port of Myos Hormos would later be built, 26 kilometres south of Mersa Gawasis. In any case, the importance of these routes was such that in the first millennium BC, the Red Sea was called the "Sea of Coptos".

During the First Intermediate Period, control of Wadi Hammamat became the subject of a conflict between the cities of Thebes and Coptos, which ended in favor of the former, ruled by Intef the Elder.

D21 Z1 O4 N35 W24 G43 N25
Rô-hanou
in hieroglyphs

Expeditions to the Red Sea through Wadi Hammamat are better documented from the Middle Kingdom. At this time, the wadi was called Rô-hanou (Note: Rô-hanou, Rohanou, Ro-henu or Ra-henew.) in ancient Egyptian, meaning "outlet of the waters" or simply "road to the sea". Under the reign of Mentuhotep III, the chancellor Henenu led an expedition into Wadi Hammamat to prepare a voyage to the Land of Punt, and it was probably at this time that the port of Saww was founded, from which expeditions to Punt departed during the Twelfth Dynasty of Egypt.

During the Middle Kingdom, under Mentuhotep III (c. 2009–1997 BC), an expedition of 3,000 men heading toward the Red Sea had to cross Wadi Hammamat under the protection of hunters and inhabitants of the Eastern Desert, who were the sole masters of this part of Egypt at a time when the power of the Egyptian monarchy was wavering. Under Senusret I, construction work in the Karnak Temple required the extraction of a dark grey-green greywacke stone for the production of monumental statues. An inscription details the organization of such an expedition at the end of the reign of Senusret I, which required the movement of 19,000 people to bring 60 sphinxes and 150 statues back from the valley. Wadi Hammamat was also rich in gold, granite and basalt. Their extraction had to be carried out under strong escort and with the protection of local populations. The peak of exploitation of these mines occurred precisely between the end of the Eleventh Dynasty of Egypt and the Twelfth Dynasty of Egypt. On a stela, an inscription dated to year 38 of Senusret I (Twelfth Dynasty of Egypt), discovered during surveys conducted in 1947 by Georges Goyon, mentions the titles of the expedition leader, those accompanying him, the number of workers, the leader's merits, the outcome and duration of the mission, as well as the various rations distributed and their sources.

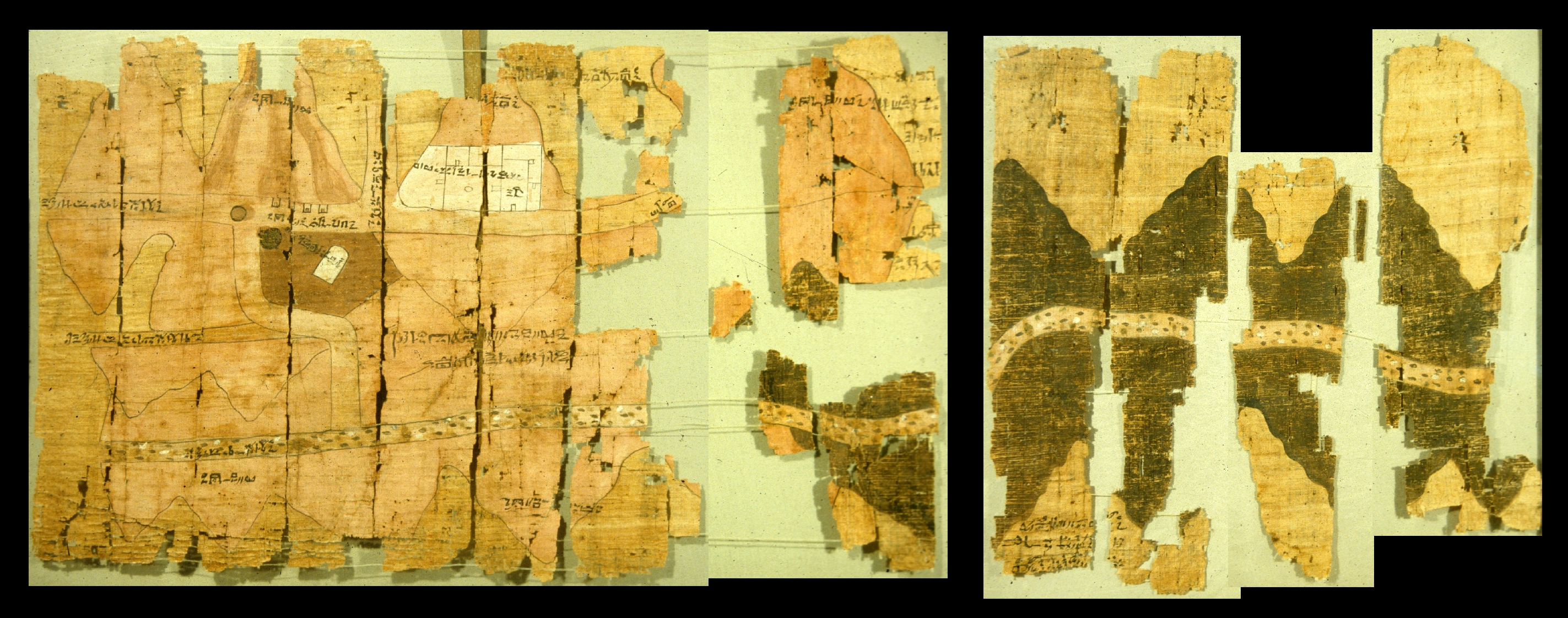
Turin Papyrus Map describing the access route to the Faouakhir mines via Wadi Hammamat.

During the Second Intermediate Period, another of these inscriptions commemorates an expedition of 130 men sent to obtain stone from Wadi Hammamat, perhaps to make the two obelisks in schistose sandstone in the name of Sobekemsaf I (Seventeenth Dynasty of Egypt), one of which was found in the cache of Karnak.

During the New Kingdom, exploitation of the gold mines around Wadi Hammamat continued, but quarrying activity may have declined. Despite the flourishing architectural activity of this period, inscriptions mentioning New Kingdom pharaohs in the quarries of Wadi Hammamat are scarce before the Ramesside period. This suggests a certain lack of interest in the stones of this valley during this period. The Turin Papyrus Map, from the 12th century BC, describes the gold mines of Faouakhir in the Eastern Desert near Wadi Hammamat. The geological map it contains must have been drawn on the occasion of an expedition during the reign of Ramesses IV (Twentieth Dynasty of Egypt). During the New Kingdom, the god Amun-Ra became prominent in the rock inscriptions of Wadi Hammamat. The Turin papyrus also tells us that a sanctuary of Amun (of which no remains survive today) existed at that time not far from the intersection of Wadi Hammamat and Wadi Fawakhi, probably at the site of the later Ptolemaic sanctuary of Min.

=== Under Persian administration ===
Quarrying activity at Wadi Hammamat remained important under the Achaemenid Persian occupation. The stone used for the erection of the statue of Darius the Great at the royal palace of Susa came from Wadi Hammamat. It has been suggested that some of the blocks extracted from the quarries of Wadi Hammamat at this time may have been transported by ship to Persia via the Red Sea.

No inscriptions from the 28th, 29th and 30th Dynasties have been found in Wadi Hammamat.

=== Under Greek administration ===
Segment of a column from the sanctuary of Min at Bir el-Fawakhir.

The advent of the Ptolemaic dynasty was marked by an ambitious takeover of the Eastern Desert of Egypt by the new regime. The beginnings of the Ptolemaic period saw an increase in maritime traffic on the Red Sea and consequently between the Red Sea and the Nile Valley. Ptolemy II Philadelphus was responsible for considerable development work on the tracks of the Eastern Desert and especially on the Red Sea coast, including the construction of the ports of Berenice, Arsinoe and Philotera. At the same time, the early Ptolemies deployed considerable resources to establish gold mining in the Eastern Desert on an almost industrial scale. This exploitation was based primarily on the resumption of earlier mining sites, especially those of the New Kingdom. This was the case at Bir el-Fawakhir, at the eastern end of Wadi Hammamat, known during the Hellenistic and Roman periods as Persou, where Ptolemy III Euergetes built a sanctuary dedicated to the god Min. Conversely, the Ptolemaic period saw a decline in the exploitation of stone quarries in the Eastern Desert in general and Wadi Hammamat in particular. Nevertheless, the latter's quarries remained in service and greywacke continued to be a resource used by the monarchy and the clergy.

Routes through the Eastern Desert of Egypt during the Ptolemaic period.

In the 2nd century BC, flourishing commercial traffic developed with Arabian Peninsula and India via the Red Sea. The caravan routes between Coptos and the sea thus became of major importance to this trade, particularly the Edfu–Berenice route at first. However, it was possibly during this period that the port of Myos Hormos was built. This foundation may have been intended to replace the previously dominant port of Berenice and the Edfu–Berenice route, which were too vulnerable to possible rebels from the Thebaid region (as they were located south of Thebes), as demonstrated by the Great Theban Revolt. Myos Hormos and the ancient pharaonic route between Coptos and the sea via Wadi Hammamat then became the main gateway into Egypt for luxury goods from Arabia and India. Despite some works, the Coptos–Myos Hormos route was never as well developed by the Ptolemies as the Edfu–Berenice route had been. Strabo wrote in the 1st century BC that there were no equipped stopping stations on the route and that merchants had to travel at night carrying their own water. Nevertheless, Strabo's account, written by an author notoriously opposed to the Ptolemies, should be tempered. For example, the geographer explained that 120 ships left Myos Hormos each year for India after Rome took control of the port, compared with only a few under the Ptolemies, which is highly implausible. It is known that some stopping places and wells did exist on the Coptos–Myos Hormos route during the Ptolemaic period, including Bir el-Fawakhir, where an important mining village was located, as well as Phoinikôn and probably Bi'r Sayyâla, although it is true that most stops must have been made in simple rock shelters.

=== Under Roman administration ===
The Roman village and the naos of Tiberius at the foot of the Bekhen mountain.

After the fall of the Ptolemaic dynasty, the Romans seized Egypt and took over the Ptolemaic infrastructure and activities in the Eastern Desert. However, the intensive gold extraction under the Ptolemies declined sharply (the Romans had access to other, much more profitable sources of gold) in favour of stone extraction: building stone and gemstones. The Mons Claudianus and Mons Porphyrites quarries opened by the Romans became the largest in the Eastern Desert. In and around Wadi Hammamat, gold and gemstone mines and fine-stone quarries retained part of their activity. However, extraction of greywacke seems to have declined during this period in favour of green breccia. A quarrymen's village and military post was built under Tiberius in Wadi Hammamat under the name Persou-et-Tamostymis. The village had a small chapel where a stone quarryman working with bekhen left graffiti dated precisely to 2 October of year 18 on a wall of the naos. The unfortified military post served both as a base for quarrying operations and as a control post on the road. At the eastern end of Wadi Hammamat, the mining village of Bir el-Fawakhir, Persou, remained active, and a fort was built there during the first half of the 1st century.

During the Roman period, the syncretic deities Isis/Hathor, Horus/Harpocrates and Amun/Pan are the most frequently represented on the cliffs of Wadi Hammamat.

The creation of the Roman Empire and the advent of the Pax Romana marked a new phase of expansion in global trade, including on the Red Sea. During the High Roman Empire, the revenue obtained by the Roman state from taxing maritime trade associated with Egyptian ports on the Red Sea coast is estimated at 100 million sesterces per year. This success was associated with major works to improve the Red Sea ports and develop the roads of the Eastern Desert of Egypt, far surpassing all Ptolemaic investment in previous centuries. The Coptos–Myos Hormos route, which had been little developed by the Ptolemies, received the most attention from the new regime. During the first two centuries AD, numerous stopping stations, wells, cisterns, watchtowers and forts were developed along the entire route.

Around the middle of the 1st century, the port of Myos Hormos lost its pre-eminence in maritime trade with India to Berenice, possibly because of the increase in ship tonnage. Myos Hormos may have retained its role in trade with Arabia, but activity clearly declined at the port and along the Coptos–Myos Hormos road. Despite this decline, work on the road by the Roman authorities did not decrease, possibly because the road and port were adapted for military purposes.

The el-Hammamat well (Bir el-Hammamat) among the remains of the ancient Roman fort.

Under the Flavians, at the end of the 1st century, there was a new major phase of development of the Eastern Desert roads. In 76 or 77, the prefect of Egypt Lucius Julius Ursus received complaints from merchants who considered the roads from Myos Hormos and Berenice to the Nile Valley insufficiently equipped with wells and insufficiently secure. From then on, all new Roman constructions on the Coptos–Myos Hormos road were fortified, reinforcing the idea of a certain increase in insecurity in the area. The prefect therefore ordered the construction of a network of forts (the praesidia, all built according to the same model) and fortified wells (the hydreuma). These works enabled caravans to find water at a maximum distance of 40 kilometres and never to be more than 20 kilometres from a water source and a garrison. It was in this context that the fort of Krokodilô (between Coptos and Wadi Hammamat) was built, possibly to replace the military post of Tiberius at Wadi Hammamat, which was abandoned. During the entire High Roman Empire, more than 70 watchtowers and a dozen forts were built along the Coptos–Myos Hormos road. Nevertheless, not all of them were in service simultaneously, and their occupation varied over time. For example, the fort of Bir el-Hammamat, built in the 2nd century, probably aimed to replace the fort of Krokodilô. At the end of the 2nd century, the road to Myos Hormos was better equipped than the road to the port of Berenice even though the latter was more important commercially. The large number of forts does not correspond to a real need for such frequent stopping points and certainly reflects a security requirement.

At the end of the 2nd century, the Roman Empire entered a period of deep crisis. Roman authorities were no longer able to maintain their activities in the Eastern Desert. Quarrying at Wadi Hammamat ceased. Most of the road sites on the Coptos–Myos Hormos road, as well as the port of Myos Hormos, were abandoned at the beginning of the 3rd century. It is unclear whether the decline in maritime trade was the cause or consequence of the abandonment of these installations. In any case, the port of Myos Hormos was no longer maintained and silted up, and the soldiers abandoned the forts. From then on, the Roman administration prioritized the port of Berenice.

=== Middle Ages ===
Remains of the mining village of Bir el-Fawakhir.

In the 5th century, the Byzantine Empire, which was short of gold, resumed mining in the valleys surrounding Wadi Hammamat. Expeditions once again set out from Coptos to the mines through Wadi Hammamat, as in the pharaonic period. But whereas ancient mining activity had been concentrated in Wadi el-Sid, the Byzantine authorities increasingly exploited Wadi Fawakhir. Wadi Fawakhir was less rich in gold than Wadi el-Sid, but the latter may already have been exhausted in Antiquity, at least using the extraction techniques of the period. The Byzantine authorities' strong need for gold appears to have justified exploitation of the relatively unprofitable Wadi Fawakhir. In this context, some of the forts of the High Roman Empire located between Coptos and Wadi Fawakhir were reoccupied. The mines of Wadi Fawakhir appear to have been intensively exploited and then abandoned or nearly abandoned several times over a period of about 150 to 170 years. At its peak, the mining village of Bir el-Fawakhir probably had a population of 1,000. Ultimately, the mines were abandoned toward the end of the 6th century, probably because of depletion and the difficult political context.

After the Arab conquest of Egypt, the Wadi Hammamat route was used by Muslim pilgrims travelling to Mecca. They crossed the ancient caravan route from the Nile Valley to reach the port of El Qoseir, and from there crossed the Red Sea to Jeddah in Arabia. The Roman fort of Bir el-Hammamat was then used as a stopping point on the route by pilgrims. It was in this context that a mosque was built in the fort's courtyard during the Middle Ages.

=== Modern history ===
In 1830, British engineers built a modern well at the site of the ancient Bir el-Hammamat well in the courtyard of the former Roman fort. The well was still in excellent condition in the following century but little used because its water was somewhat brackish. The well lost its importance after pilgrims to Mecca stopped passing through the valley.

The Bir el-Hammamat well.

In 1890, the engineer Charles Nicour was commissioned to conduct surveys to determine the feasibility of building a railway between Qena and El Qoseir through Wadi Hammamat and the ancient caravan route. Ultimately, a road suitable for wheeled vehicles was built, the present Route 256 (or Qift–El Qoseir road). This road follows almost exactly the route of the ancient road, except in the gorges of Bir el-Sid. The ancient road favoured passage through Wadi Fawakhir in order to avoid the gorges of Bir el-Sid, which were extremely difficult to traverse until modern widening works. The two routes meet again in Wadi Abu Ziran, which continues the route eastward. The construction of the road caused the destruction of the remains of the Ptolemaic sanctuary of Min at Bir el-Fawakhir.

Wadi Hammamat was studied by the first European explorers of the 19th century (James Burton, Émile Prisse d'Avennes, Karl Richard Lepsius, Vladimir Golenishchev...). They all noted the wealth of hieroglyphic inscriptions on the rocks of the valley.

The route of the modern road between Qena and El Qoseir.

G. W. Murray was the first to identify the mines of the Turin Papyrus Map with Wadi Hammamat and the neighbouring valleys. This was subsequently confirmed by Georges Goyon.

At the end of the 1980s, the Institut Français d'Archéologie Orientale carried out an epigraphic survey at Wadi Hammamat. The objective of this mission was to locate and verify known texts, search for new graffiti, and establish a topographic plan of the site. The team found 250 new inscriptions, including a long text from the reign of Merenre, an inscription from the Middle Kingdom and several graffiti from the New Kingdom.

Today, Wadi Hammamat marks the boundary between Qena Governorate and the Red Sea Governorate. The area is still exploited for gold, notably at Wadi el-Sid.

== Bibliography ==
- Barron, Thomas; Hume, William Fraser (1902). Topography and geology of the Eastern desert of Egypt: Central portion. Cairo: Egyptian National Printing Department.
- Couyat, Jules; Montet, Pierre (1912). Les inscriptions hiéroglyphiques et hiératiques du Ouâdi Hammâmât. Mémoires publiés par les membres de l’Institut français d’archéologie orientale (in French). Cairo: Imprimerie de l'Institut Français d'Archéologie Orientale. ISBN 9782724712117.
- Raimondi, Jean (1923). Le désert Oriental égyptien: du Nil à la Mer Rouge; ses richesses dans le passé, son importance dans l’avenir (in French). Cairo: Imprimerie de l'Institut Français d'Archéologie Orientale.
- Survey of Egypt (1928). Atlas of Egypt. Giza: Egyptian Government Press.
- Murray, G. W. (1941). "The gold-mine of the Turin papyrus". Bulletin de l’institut d’Égypte. XXIV (1): 81–86.
- Goyon, Georges (1949). "Le papyrus de Turin dit "des mines d'or" et le Wadi Hammamat". Annales du service des antiquités de l'Égypte (in French). 49: 337–392.
- Goyon, Georges (1957). Nouvelles inscriptions rupestres du Wadi Hammamat (in French). Paris: Imprimerie nationale.
- Porter, Bertha; Moss, Rosalind; Burney, Ethel W. (1975). Topographical Bibliography of Ancient Egyptian Hieroglyphic Text, Reliefs, and Paintings, Vol. VII: Nubia, The Deserts and Outside Egypt (PDF) (2 ed.). Oxford: Clarendon Press. ISBN 9780900416040.
- Gasse, Annie (1987). "Une expédition au Ouadi Hammamat sous le règne de Sebekemsaf Ier". Bulletin de l'Institut Français d'Archéologie Orientale (in French). 87: 207–218.
- Bradbury, Louise (1988). "Reflections on Traveling to "God's Land" and Punt in the Middle Kingdom". Journal of the American Research Center in Egypt. 25: 127–156.
- Gasse, Annie (1988). "Découvertes récentes au Ouadi Hammamat". Studien zur Altägyptischen Kultur (in French). 15: 295.
- Redford, Susan; Redford, Donald B. (1989). "Graffiti and Petroglyphs Old and New from the Eastern Desert". Journal of the American Research Center in Egypt. 26: 3–49.
- Egyptian General Survey Authority (1989). Egyptian Series 1:50000.
- Zitterkopf, Ronald E.; Sidebotham, Steven E. (1989). "Stations and Towers on the Quseir-Nile Road". Journal of Egyptian Archaeology. 75: 155–189.
- Harrell, James A.; Brown, V. Max (1992). "The Oldest Surviving Topographical Map from Ancient Egypt: (Turin Papyri 1879, 1899, and 1969)". Journal of the American Research Center in Egypt. 29: 81–105.
- Farout, Dominique (1994). "La carrière du wẖmw Ameny et l'organisation des expéditions au Ouadi Hammamat au Moyen Empire". Bulletin de l'Institut Français d'Archéologie Orientale (in French). 94: 143–172.
- Cruz-Uribe, Eugene (2001). "Demotic Graffiti from the Wadi Hammamat". Journal of the Society for the Study of Egyptian Antiquities. 28: 26–54.
- Meeks, Dimitri (2002). "Coptos et les chemins du Pount". Topoi Orient-Occident (in French) (suppl. 3): 267–335.
- Traunecker, Claude (2002). "Le panthéon du Ouadi Hammâmât (Inscription n° 58)". Topoi Orient-Occident (in French) (suppl. 3): 355–383.
- Brun, Jean-Pierre (2002). "Hodos Myshormitikè : l'équipement de la route entre Coptos et la mer Rouge aux époques ptolémaïque et romaine". Topoi Orient-Occident (in French) (suppl. 3): 395–414.
- Sidebotham, Steven E. (2005). "Reviewed Work: La route de Myos Hormos: L'armée romaine dans le desert Orientale d'Égypte by Hélène Cuvign". Journal of the American Oriental Society. 125 (1): 131–133.
- Hikade, Thomas (2006). "Expeditions to the Wadi Hammamat during the New Kingdom". Journal of Egyptian Archaeology. 92: 153–168.
- Bloxam, Elizabeth; Harrell, James; Kelany, Adel; Moloney, Norah; el-Senussi, Ashraf; Tohamey, Adel (2014). "Investigating the Predynastic origins of greywacke working in the Wadi Hammamat". Archéo-Nil. 24: 11–30.
- Bard, Kathryn A. (2014). Bard, Kathryn A. (ed.). Encyclopedia of the Archaeology of Ancient Egypt. London & New York: Routledge. ISBN 9780415757539.
- Gasse, Annie (2016). "Wadi Hammamat on the Road to Punt". Abgadiyat. 11 (1): 44–50.
- Agut, Damien; Moreno Garcia, Juan Carlos (2016) [2018]. L'Égypte des pharaons : De Narmer à Dioclétien 3150 av. J.-C. - 284 apr. J.-C. Mondes anciens (in French). Paris: Éditions Belin. p. 847. ISBN 9782701164915.
- Brun, Jean-Pierre (2018). "Chronology of the Forts of the Routes to Myos Hormos and Berenike during the Graeco-Roman Period". In Brun, Jean-Pierre; Faucher, Thomas; Redon, Bérangère; Sidebotham, Steven (eds.). The Eastern Desert of Egypt during the Greco-Roman Period: Archaeological Reports. Paris: Collège de France. ISBN 9782722604810.
- Redon, Bérangère (2018). "The Control of the Eastern Desert by the Ptolemies: New Archaeological Data". In Brun, Jean-Pierre; Faucher, Thomas; Redon, Bérangère; Sidebotham, Steven (eds.). The Eastern Desert of Egypt during the Greco-Roman Period: Archaeological Reports. Paris: Collège de France. ISBN 9782722604810.
- Pantalacci, Laure (2018). "Coptos, Gate to the Eastern Desert". In Brun, Jean-Pierre; Faucher, Thomas; Redon, Bérangère; Sidebotham, Steven (eds.). The Eastern Desert of Egypt during the Greco-Roman Period: Archaeological Reports. Paris: Collège de France. ISBN 9782722604810.
- Faucher, Thomas (2018). "Ptolemaic Gold: the Exploitation of Gold in the Eastern Desert". In Brun, Jean-Pierre; Faucher, Thomas; Redon, Bérangère; Sidebotham, Steven (eds.). The Eastern Desert of Egypt during the Greco-Roman Period: Archaeological Reports. Paris: Collège de France. ISBN 9782722604810.
- Meyer, Carol (2018). "Bi'r Umm Fawâkhir: Gold Mining in Byzantine Times in the Eastern Desert". In Brun, Jean-Pierre; Faucher, Thomas; Redon, Bérangère; Sidebotham, Steven (eds.). The Eastern Desert of Egypt during the Greco-Roman Period: Archaeological Reports. Paris: Collège de France. ISBN 9782722604810.
- Obsomer, Claude (2020). "Les inscriptions hiéroglyphiques de l'époque perse au Ouadi Hammamat (Égypte)" (PDF). Les Études Classiques (in French). 88: 227–262.
- Morel, Vincent; Olette-Pelletier, Jean-Guillaume (2021). "Découvertes chromatiques dans les carrières du ouadi Hammamat". Bulletin de la société française d'égyptologie (in French) (205): 14–37.
- Othman, Ahmed Ibrahim (2021). "A Preliminary Perspective of Industrial Heritage and Geo-Tourism in the Quarry Site of Bir Hammamat". Journal of Tourism, Hotels and Heritage. 2 (1): 30–46.
- Cobb, Matthew Adam; Wilkinson, Troy (2022). "The Roman state and Red Sea trade revenue". In Durand, Caroline; Marchand, Julie; Redon, Bérangère; Schneider, Pierre (eds.). Networked spaces: The spatiality of networks in the Red Sea and Western Indian Ocean. Lyon: MOM Éditions. pp. 213–226. ISBN 9782356680785.
- Goncalves, Isabelle (2022). "Exploiting and crossing the Egyptian Eastern Desert during the Pharaonic Era". In Durand, Caroline; Marchand, Julie; Redon, Bérangère; Schneider, Pierre (eds.). Networked spaces: The spatiality of networks in the Red Sea and Western Indian Ocean. Lyon: MOM Éditions. pp. 329–346. ISBN 9782356680785.
- Moroney, Morgan E. (2023). "The Egyptian Road Most Taken: Mapping the Least Cost Path Routes from the Nile to the Red Sea Coast". In Lucarelli, Rita; Roberson, Joshua A.; Vinson, Steve (eds.). Ancient Egypt, New Technology: The Present and Future of Computer Visualization, Virtual Reality and Other Digital Humanities in Egyptology. Leiden & Boston: Brill Publishers. pp. 298–321. ISBN 9789004501287.
- Desplancques, Sophie (2025). L'Égypte ancienne. Que sais-je? (in French) (5 ed.). Presses Universitaires de France. ISBN 9782715437548.
- Redon, Bérangère; Manière, Louis (2025). "The Towers on the Roman Coptos–Myos Hormos Road in Egypt: Communication Signals or Surveillance Towers?". Journal of Egyptian Archaeology. 111 (1–2): 61–76.
- Redon, Bérangère (2025). Sur les routes du désert Oriental égyptien : De la piste ptolémaïque d'Edfou à Bérénice au réseau des praesidia romains (in French). Lyon: MOM Éditions. ISBN 9782356680914.

== See also ==
- Stone quarries of ancient Egypt
