= Mersa Gawasis =

Egyptian harbour on the Red Sea and former port city

Coordinates: 26°33′26″N 34°02′11″E

Mersa Gawasis in hieroglyphs
O34 G39 G1 G43 G43 N25
Saww
S3ww
Sauu

Mersa Gawasis in Egypt

Mersa Gawasis (Ancient Egyptian Saww) is a small Egyptian harbour on the Red Sea and a former Egyptian port city. The harbour lies at the mouth of Wadi Gawasis, 2 km south of the mouth of Wadi Gasus. 25 km north is the city of Safaga and 50 km south al-Qusair. mersa gawasis coordinates The place was apparently used as a port in the reigns of Senusret I to Amenemhat IV of the 12th Dynasty, and served as a loading point for expeditions to Punt. The harbour was also a starting point for journeys to the mines of Sinai.

== Etymology ==
Mersa means port, and Gawasis is a medieval term for scout boat.

== History of investigation ==
When a stele from the 12th Dynasty was found in Wadi Gasus, in which a nearby port called Saww was mentioned, the University of Alexandria began an excavation headed by Abdel Monem A.H. Sayed near the Graeco-Roman hydreuma (watering station) where the stele was found. As no other pharaonic monuments were found, it was concluded that the stele had been transported in Roman times from Saww to the watering station. The search was continued further east at the mouth of Mersa Gasus, where still no pharaonic remains were found.

Just two kilometers further south of Mersa Gawasis, a small stele was discovered with fragmentary inscriptions of the cartouche of Senusret I and the geographical name Bia-n-punt. 250 meters west of the harbor, on the north side of Wadi Gawasis, was found a small shrine with the name and titles of Ankhu, valet of Senusret I. The shrine consisted of a limestone anchor as a base, from which the upper holes were cut out. In the inscriptions appeared again the name Saww (as Sww), which is confirmed as the location of the harbor at Mersa Gawasis.

Two hundred meters to the west of the shrine, another small stele was discovered with a limestone anchor as a base. It contained an order from Senusret I to the vizier Intefiqer for a ship to travel to Bia-Punt. Subsequent excavations in 1977 recovered some pottery shards with hieratic inscriptions listing the content, origin and destination of the vessels. Among them appeared a temple of Senusret II, the name Punt and the name of an official from the time of Senusret III.

The finds revealed that Saww could now be clearly identified with Mersa Gawasis and that in the Middle Kingdom the ships sailed from here to Punt and back. It was found that the ships - as on the outward journey - were disassembled on return and transported to the Nile Valley in pieces. The approximately 250 pounds (110 kg) anchors were made in Mersa Gawasis and on return were left in place and reused, for example as a shrine or stela base.

== 2005 discoveries ==
In a 2005 expedition to Mersa/Wadi Gawasis, archaeologist Kathryn Bard found remains of Egyptian seagoing vessels and hieroglyphic texts on stelae about royal expeditions to Punt, including cedar planks from Queen Hatshepsut's expedition in the 15th century BCE, demonstrating that Mersa/Wadi Gawasis was the port in Egypt from which trade was carried out with Punt, some 1200 km south on the Red Sea.

== Bibliography ==
- Kathryn A. Bard: Harbor of the Pharaohs to the land of Punt, 2007, ISBN 978-88-95044-11-8.
- Abdel Monem A.H. Sayed: Wadi Gasus in: Kathryn A. Bard, Encyclopedia of the Archaeology of Ancient Egypt, 1999, S. 866–868.
- Stoddard, Tim (18 March 2005). "Archaeologists discover ancient ships in Egypt". B.U. Bridge. Vol. 7, no. 23. Boston University.
