= Qasr el Banat, Red Sea Governorate =

Ancient Roman fort in Egypt

Qasr el Banat
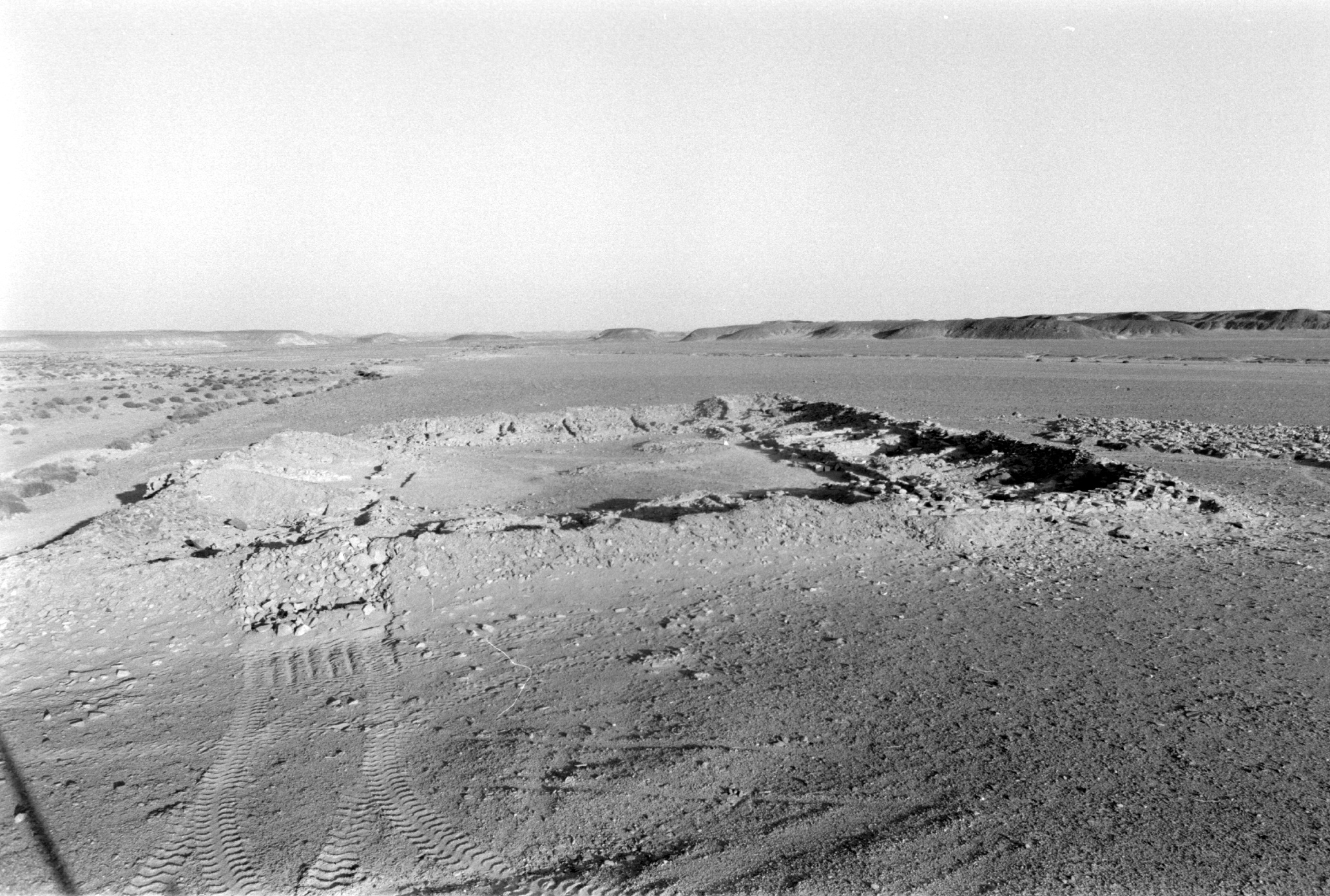

- Location within Egypt
- 25°55′10″N 33°15′48″E
- Type: Fort
- Cultures: Ancient Rome

Site notes
- Material: Stone
- Length: 40 metres (130 ft)
- Width: 33 metres (108 ft)

Qasr el Banat (Arabic: قصور البَنَات) is an ancient Roman fort located along the Wadi Hammamat road, starting near the present day position of El Qoseir and connecting the Red Sea to the Nile this route has been used for thousands of years with graffiti found along the route ranging from the Predynastic period (c. 3200 BC) to the Islamic era (c. 7th century AD) with some graffiti and petroglyphs in the immediate vicinity of the road dating from the Old Kingdom, the New Kingdom and from the arab period, in particular there is a nearby rocky outcrop covered in graffiti which gives the fort its name, as well as graffiti covered limestone block near the southeast corner of the station. Some inscriptions near the fort have also been dated to the Augustan and Hadrianic period.

During the Roman period the road was a heavily used trade route to transport products from the mines in the mountains to the Nile Valley. To secure this route the Romans built a number of hydreumata or fortified watering stations along the road, with Qasr el-Banat being one such location and it has been dated to at least the 1st century BC.

The fort itself sits in a wadi in an area of low lying hills. It is one of the smaller stations along the route with interior dimensions of 28.3x35.7 meters. The entrance to the structure was on the north side, an consisted of a central courtyard with room all the way around the interior walls. While there is no evidence of a well, there may have been a cistern at the southern edge of the station.
