= Turin Papyrus Map =

Old Egyptian map of mines

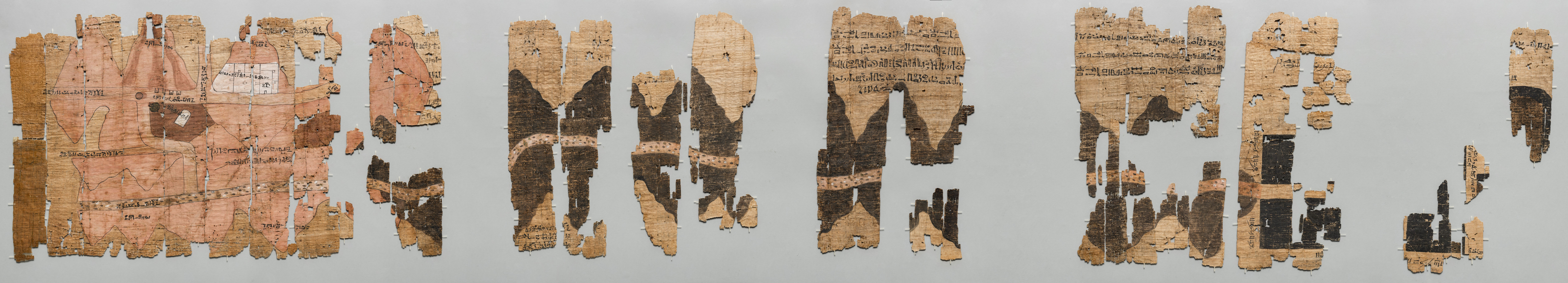
- Recto of the Turin Papyrus Map, with the map of Wadi Hammamat
- Material: Papyrus, ink
- Size: 2820 × 410 mm
- Created: 1155–1150 BCE
- Period/culture: New Kingdom of Egypt, Twentieth Dynasty of Egypt
- Discovered: before 1824 probably Deir el-Medina, Thebes
- Present location: Museo Egizio, Turin, Italy
- Identification: Cat. 1879+1969+1899+2083/174+2083/182

The Turin Papyrus Map, also known as the Mine Papyrus or "Goldmine Papyrus", is an ancient Egyptian map on papyrus, dated to 1155–1150 BCE and preserved in the Museo Egizio in Turin. It is generally considered one of the earliest known geographical maps, the oldest surviving topographic map from ancient Egypt and the world's oldest surviving geological map. The map was drawn on the recto of the papyrus and represents the Wadi Hammamat in the Eastern Desert, while the verso contains unrelated texts in hieratic.

The map has been connected with a quarrying expedition organized in the third year of Ramesses IV's reign to obtain blocks of bekhen-stone, usually identified with greywacke, for royal statues. The papyrus probably belonged to the Deir el-Medina scribe Amennakhte, son of Ipuy, who is also considered a likely author of the document.

== History of the artifact and scholarship ==
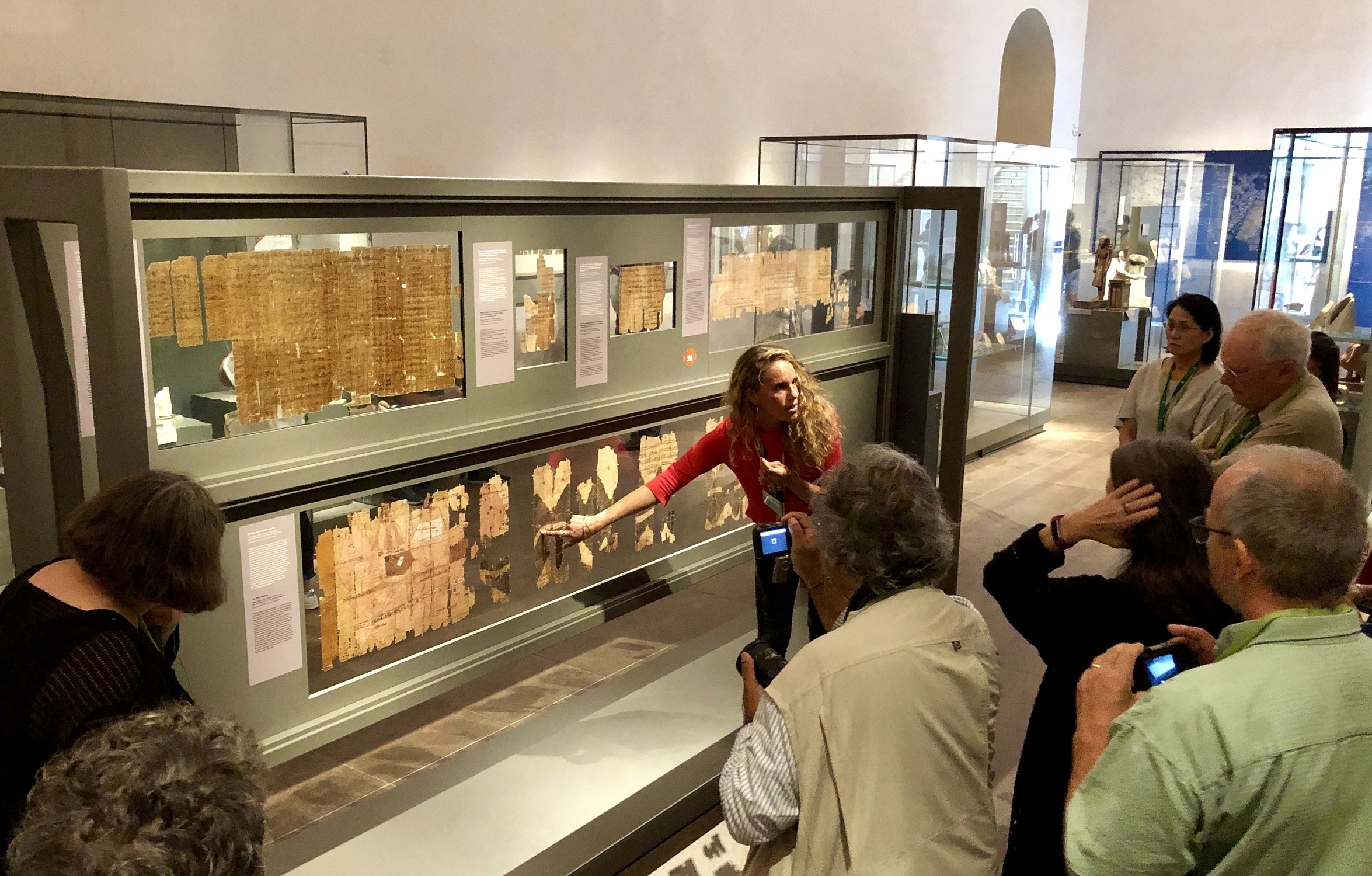
The Turin Papyrus Map on display at the Museo Egizio in 2019.

The papyrus probably comes from Deir el-Medina, the ancient village of the workmen of the Theban royal necropolis. It was acquired in Egypt by Bernardino Drovetti sometime between 1814 and 1821 and was sold in 1824 to Charles Felix of Sardinia as part of Drovetti's collection.

The interpretation of the map changed during the nineteenth and twentieth centuries. Karl Richard Lepsius first interpreted it as a plan of the tomb of Seti I, while Samuel Birch connected it in 1852 with gold mines in Nubia, especially in the Wadi Allaqi. Georges Goyon later associated the papyrus with Wadi Hammamat and with the stone and gold extraction areas attested there. Harrell and Brown proposed a new reconstruction of the fragments in 1992, reducing the reconstructed length of the map from the museum arrangement of about 2.8 m to about 2.1 m.

== Description ==
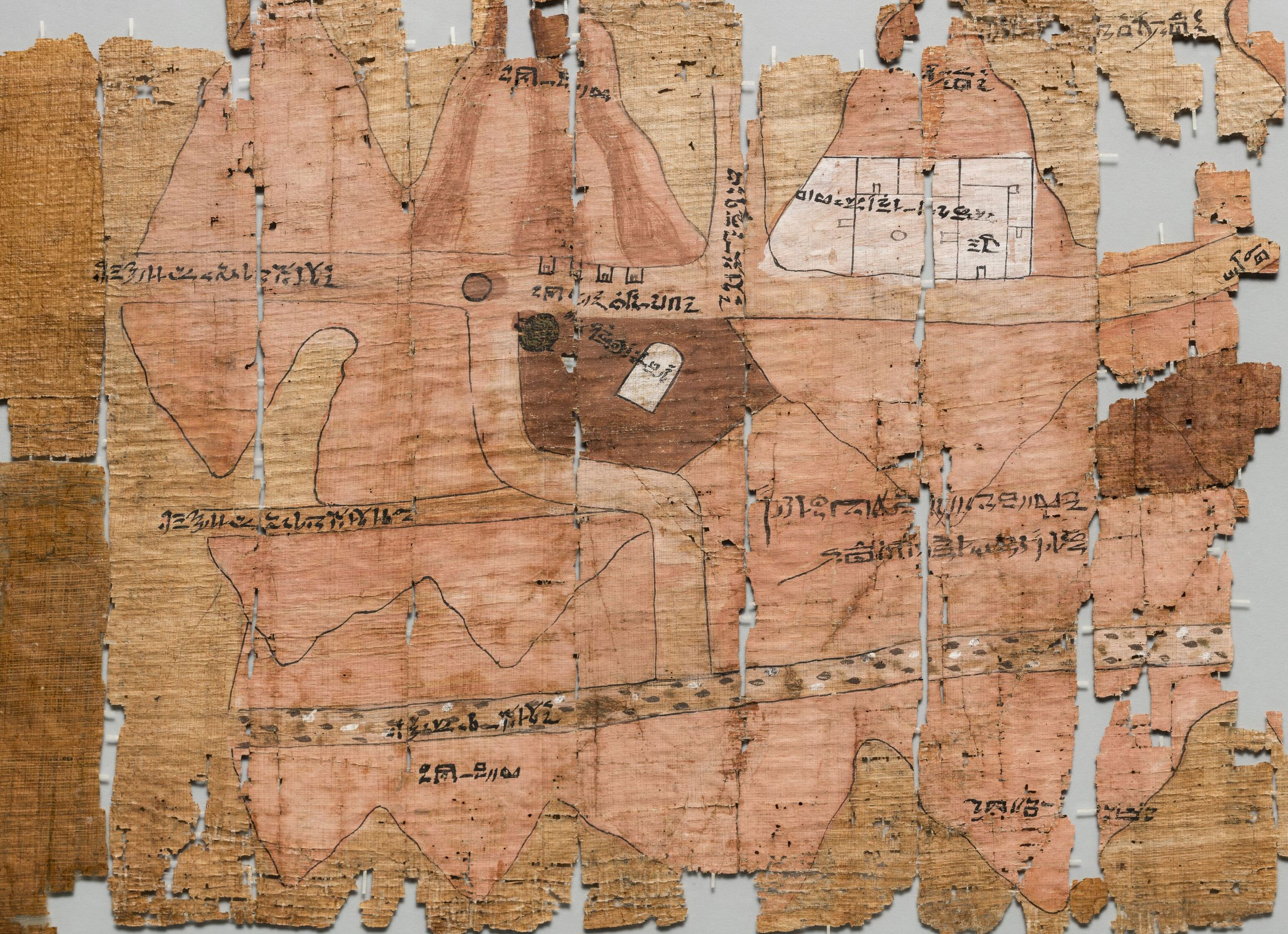
Detail of the map

The map shows a mountainous region crossed by a main wadi and several secondary wadis. The main wadi is identified with Wadi Hammamat, an ancient route that connected the Nile Valley with the Red Sea. Requena and Lull describe the represented area as the region between Bir el-Hammamat and Bir Umm Fawakhir, on the route between Coptos and Quseir.

The map is oriented with south at the top, toward the source of the Nile River. The scribe straightened the actual bends of Wadi Hammamat because they could not otherwise have been represented within the long, narrow papyrus scroll. The map does not use a constant scale, but the Museo Egizio estimates an approximate range between 50 and 100 metres per centimetre.

The hills on either side of the wadis are shown frontally and point upward or downward, a convention used in Egyptian art. The pink hills, or pink hills with brown bands, represent sedimentary rocks and pink granite outcrops, while the black hills represent effusive and metamorphic rocks. Harrell and Brown also emphasized the geological significance of the map, noting that it records different rock types and lithologically different wadi gravels.

The Turin Papyrus Online Platform records twenty-eight captions in hieratic around the drawings. These captions identify roads, buildings, gold deposits, and quarrying activities involving bekhen-stone, described as a green-greyish stone. The map also marks a chapel of Amun, the location of a stela of Seti I, a small group of four village houses, and a spotted white and brown track representing alluvial deposits. In the interpretation summarized by Requena and Lull, Klemm and Klemm identified some of the secondary wadis with Wadi Atalla and Wadi es-Sid, while Harrell and Brown identified the workers' settlement with the archaeological site of Bir Umm Fawakhir.

The map contains information on quarrying and mining, including the destination of wadi routes, the distance between quarrying and mining areas, the location of gold deposits in the hills, and the sizes of quarried blocks of bekhen-stone. Dorn and Polis note that the map concentrates on the hilly zone where greywacke was extracted and that blocks of greywacke with measurements are represented on the right side of the map. According to Harrell, the map's careful placement of topographical and geological features makes it comparable, in a broad historical sense, to an early form of geographic information system.

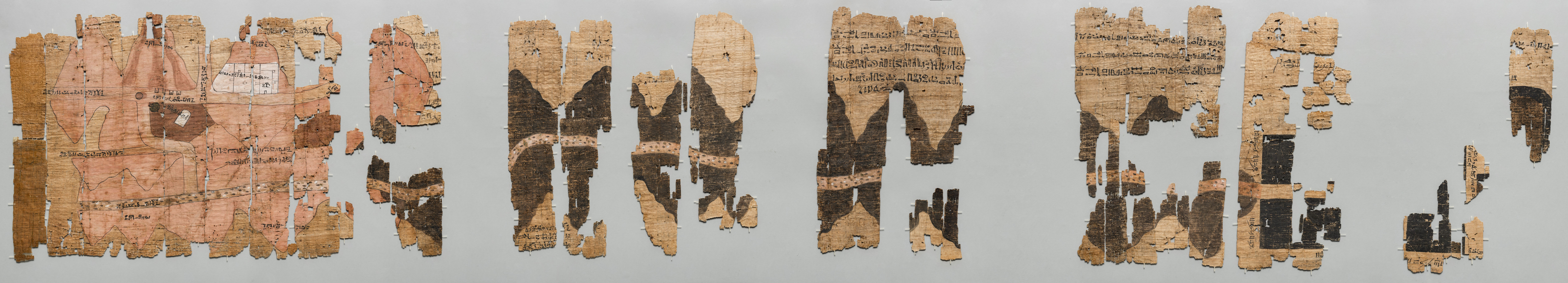
Recto of the Turin Papyrus Map, with the map of Wadi Hammamat. New Kingdom, Twentieth Dynasty, 1155–1150 BCE; Museo Egizio, Turin (Cat. 1879+1969+1899+2082/174+2083/182).

=== Verso texts ===
The verso of the papyrus was reused for well over a dozen texts and several drawings. The texts include administrative texts, accounts, literary texts, religious texts, hymns, letters, and drawings. The Museo Egizio identifies among them a copy of a letter to Ramesses VI concerning the cult of a statue, a text concerning the requisition of copper from the workmen of Deir el-Medina, a list of gods and festival days, and a text in which Amennakhte appears as witness to an oath.

The letter to Ramesses VI asks that a man be assigned to perform daily cult duties for a wooden statue adorned with faience, jasper, and gold. Willem Hovestreydt interpreted the request as having apparently been granted, since a grandson of the author later held the title of high priest of Ramesses VI. One of the hymns on the verso ends with the formula "made by the scribe Amennakhte", which Dorn and Polis treat as evidence for Amennakhte's literary authorship.

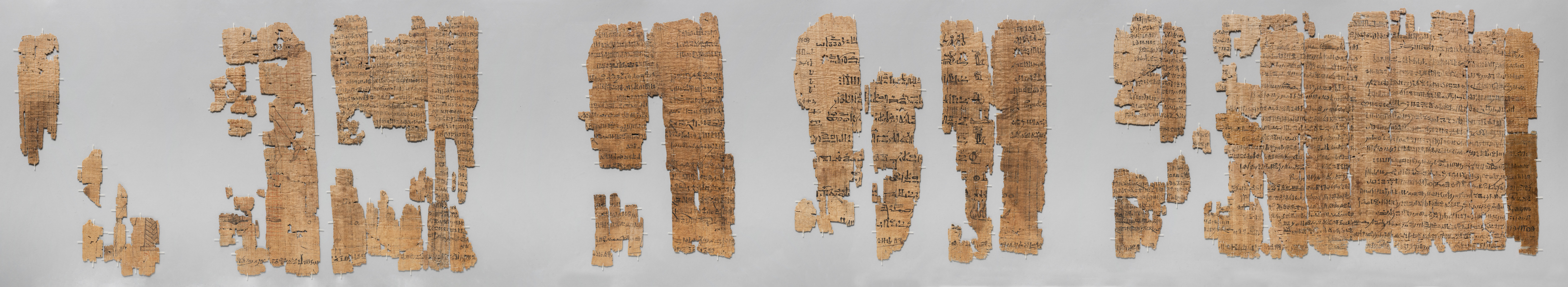
Verso of the Turin Papyrus Map, with several hieratic texts.

== The map in origami history ==
Among origami enthusiasts, the map has been discussed as a possible early example of folding. According to origami historian David Lister, the map was mentioned by Koryo Miura and Masamori Sakamaki, both from the University of Tokyo, at a meeting of the International Cartographic Association in 1980 as an early example of map folding. Lister also notes that Miura incorrectly described the object as being kept in Milan, whereas the papyrus is preserved in the Museo Egizio in Turin.

The vertical creases on the papyrus may not, however, be folding marks in the sense proposed by Miura and Sakamaki. Harrell explains the poor preservation of the rightmost portion of the papyrus as the result of the papyrus having been rolled up when discovered and then handled after discovery.

== See also ==
- List of ancient Egyptian papyri

== Bibliography ==
- Dorn, Andreas; Polis, Stéphane (2016). "Nouveaux textes littéraires du scribe Amennakhte (et autres ostraca relatifs au scribe de la Tombe)". Bulletin de l'Institut français d'archéologie orientale (in French). 116: 57–96. doi:10.4000/bifao.454.
- Dorn, Andreas; Polis, Stéphane (2022). "La vita e le opere di un antico scriba e poeta: Amennakht, figlio di Ipuy". In Greco, Christian; Rossi, Corinna; Gobeil, Cédric; Marini, Paolo (eds.). Deir el-Medina: Through the Kaleidoscope (PDF) (in Italian). Venice: Marsilio Arte. pp. 151–156. ISBN 9791254630839.
- Goyon, Georges (1949). "Le Papyrus de Turin dit "des Mines d'Or" et le Wadi Hammamat" (PDF). Annales du Service des Antiquités de l'Égypte (in French). 49: 337–392.
- Harrell, James A.; Brown, V. Max (1992a). "The World's Oldest Surviving Geological Map: The 1150 B.C. Turin Papyrus from Egypt". The Journal of Geology. 100 (1): 3–18. doi:10.1086/629568. JSTOR 30082315.
- Harrell, James A.; Brown, V. Max (1992b). "The Oldest Surviving Topographical Map from Ancient Egypt: Turin Papyri 1879, 1899, and 1969". Journal of the American Research Center in Egypt. 29: 81–105. doi:10.2307/40000486. JSTOR 40000486.
- Hovestreydt, Willem (1997). "A Letter to the King Relating to the Foundation of a Statue (P. Turin 1879 vso.)". Lingua Aegyptia. 5: 107–121.
- Klemm, Rosemarie; Klemm, Dietrich (2013). Gold and Gold Mining in Ancient Egypt and Nubia. Heidelberg: Springer. ISBN 9783642225079.
- McMahon, David M. (1992). "The Turin Papyrus Map: The Oldest Known Map with Geological Significance". Earth Sciences History. 11 (1): 9–12. doi:10.17704/eshi.11.1.484472n43765605k.
- Requena, Antonio; Lull, José (2005). "El papiro Turín 1879 / 1899 / 1969 y el mapa geológico-topográfico más antiguo conocido" (PDF). Boletín Geológico y Minero (in Spanish). 116 (2): 127–148.
