= Amenemope (pharaoh) =

Egyptian pharaoh

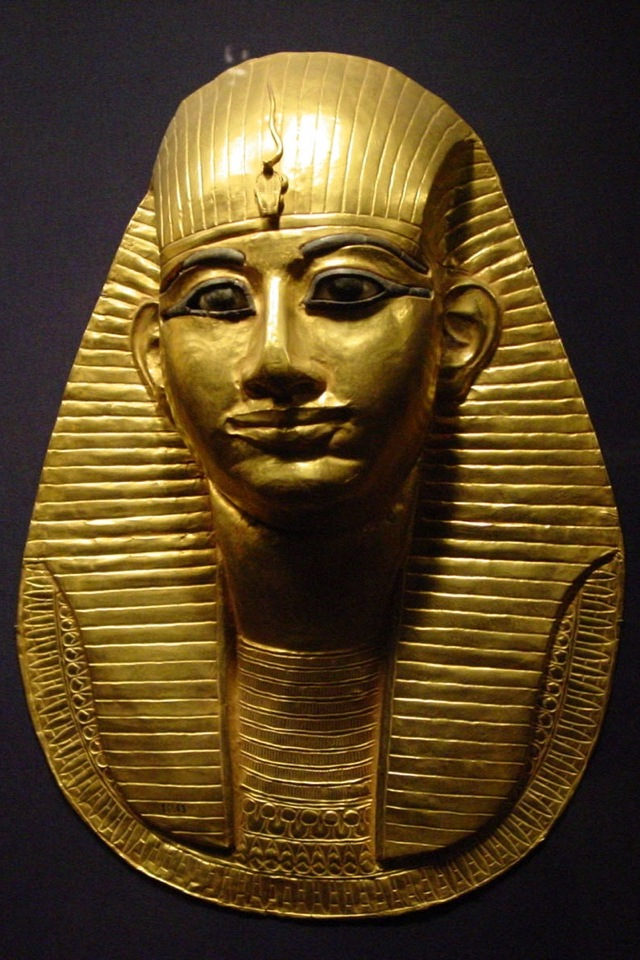
- Gilted funerary mask of pharaoh Amenemope in the Egyptian Museum

Pharaoh
- Reign: 9 years 1001 – 992 BC; 1000 BC –991 BC
- Predecessor: Psusennes I
- Successor: Osorkon the Elder
Royal titulary
Prenomen
Usermaatre-Setepenamun
Wsr-Mȝˁt-Rˁ stp.n-Jmn
Powerful is the Maat of Ra, the chosen of Amun

M23 X1 L2 X1	N5 wsr H6 i mn n N36 U21 n
Nomen
Amenemipet
Imn-m-ipet
Amun in the Opet Festival

G39 N5	i mn n Aa15 O45
- Father: Psusennes I (?)
- Mother: Mutnedjmet(?)
- Died: 992 or 991 BC
- Burial: Tanis, originally NRT IV, reburied in NRT III
- Dynasty: 21st Dynasty

Usermaatre Amenemope was an ancient Egyptian pharaoh of the 21st Dynasty who ruled from 1001 to 992 BC or 1000 to 991 BC with his first 2 or 3 years in coregency with Psusennes I, his predecessor and possible father.

Amenemope's burial is notable for being one of three entirely intact royal burials known from ancient Egypt. The others were that of Psusennes I and Shoshenq II, all three found inside Psusennes's tomb which was discovered by the French Egyptologist Pierre Montet in 1939; however, only the metal objects survived in the wet Nile Delta climate. He succeeded Psusennes I at Tanis on the throne.

== Family ==
Amenemope was the son of Psusennes I (?) and born to Mutnedjemet (?). However, the name of his wife and children are not known.

== Reign ==
When Amenemope ascended the throne he was already a man of advanced age.

=== Coregency ===
Amenemope succeeded his purported father's long reign after a period of coregency. This coregency has been deduced thanks to a linen bandage mentioning a "... king Amenemope, Year 49..." which has been reconstructed as "[Year X under] king Amenemope, Year 49 [under king Psusennes I]". It has been suggested, however, that this Year 49 may belong to the High Priest of Amun Menkheperre instead of Psusennes I, thus ruling out the coregency; this hypothesis has been rejected by Kenneth Kitchen, who still supports a coregency. Kitchen refers to the existence of Papyrus Brooklyn 16.205, a document is dated to Year 4 of an unnamed king and refers back to a Year 49 which of a previous king--once thought to refer to Shoshenq III and Pami, but can now only belong to Psusennes I since Shoshenq III did not have a reign of more than 40 years. This document was thus issued in regnal Year 4 of king Amenemope.

With a confirmed coregency, the Year 49 of Psusennes I on the linen bandage should equal Year X of Amenemope; possibly Year 4 but there is no conclusive proof it was Year 4 since the Year date of Amenemope is lost in a lacuna. The Year date of Amenemope could simply be Year 1, 2 or 3. The likelihood of a coregency is high, however, since the two year dates were inscribed on a single linen bandage. Psusennes I would have been around the age of 70–80 at the time since it was close to the end of his reign.

=== Sole reign ===
Year 5. During his reign as Pharaoh, Amenemope claimed the title of "High Priest of Amun in Tanis" as Psusennes also did before him. Amenemope's authority was fully recognized at Thebes – at this time governed by the High Priest of Amun Smendes II and then by his brother Pinedjem II – as his name appears on funerary goods of at least nine Theban burials, among these is the Book of the Dead of the "Captain of the barque of Amun", Pennestawy, dating to Amenemope's Year 5.

Apart from his Tanite tomb and the aforementioned Theban burials, Amenemope is a poorly attested ruler. He continued with the decoration of the chapel of Isis "Mistress of the Pyramids at Giza" and made an addition to one of the temples in Memphis.

=== Succession ===
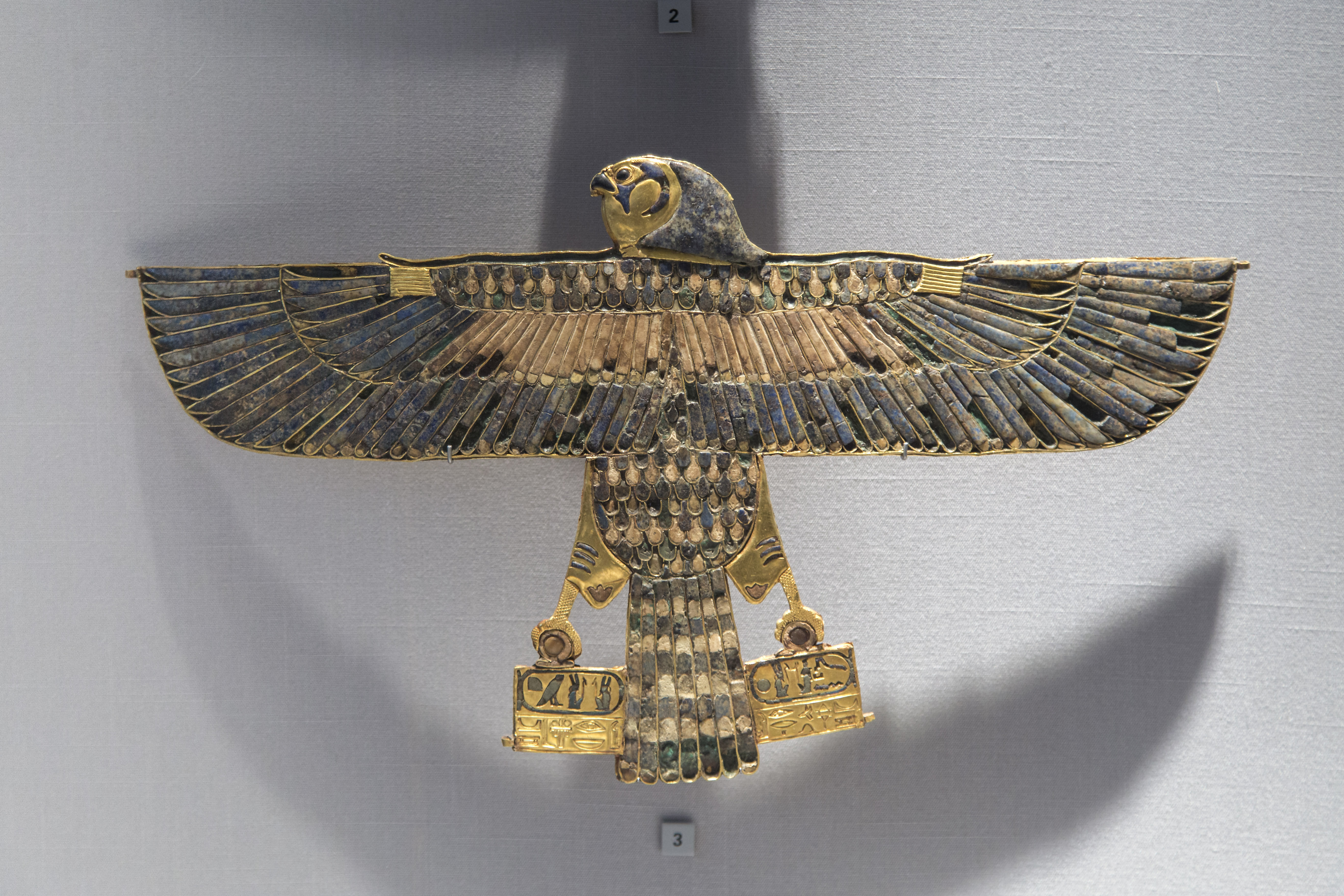
Flying Falcon Amulet of Amenemope

A crisis in the order of succession can be observed, as he was succeeded by the seemingly unrelated Osorkon the Elder. Despite problems with the succession, he was buried with Psusennes I indicating a level of respect for his remains.

=== Non-Contemporary attestations ===
Reign length. All versions of Manetho's Epitome reports that Amenophthis (Amenemope's Hellenised name) enjoyed 9 years of reign, a duration more or less confirmed by archaeological sources.

== Mummy of Amenemope ==
According to the analysis of his skeleton performed by Dr. Douglas Derry, Amenemope was a strongly-built man who reached a fairly advanced age. It seems that the king suffered a skull infection which likely developed into meningitis and led to his death.

== Burial ==
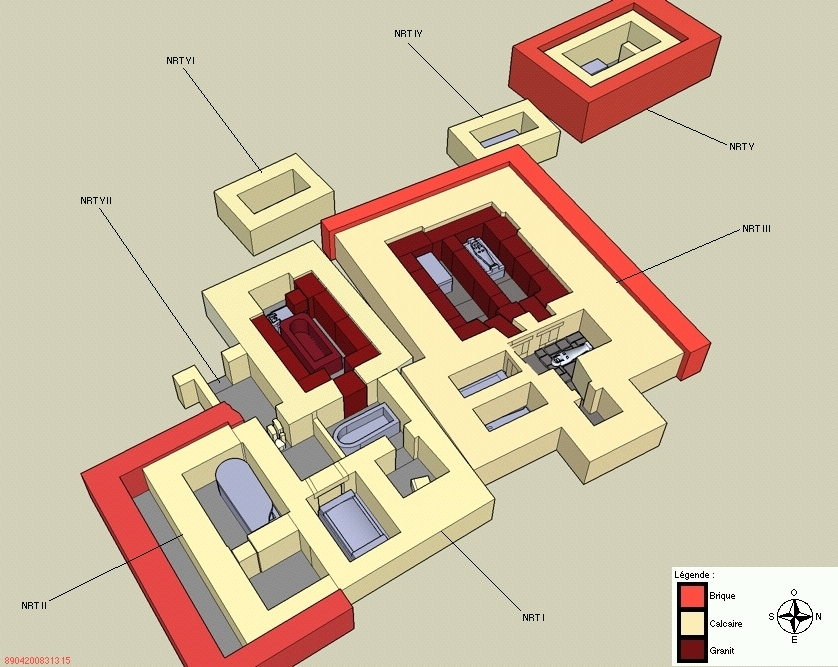
Full view of the Royal Necropolis of Tanis (NRT). Amenemope was originally buried in NRT IV and later reburied in NRT III, left granite chamber, next to Psusennes I

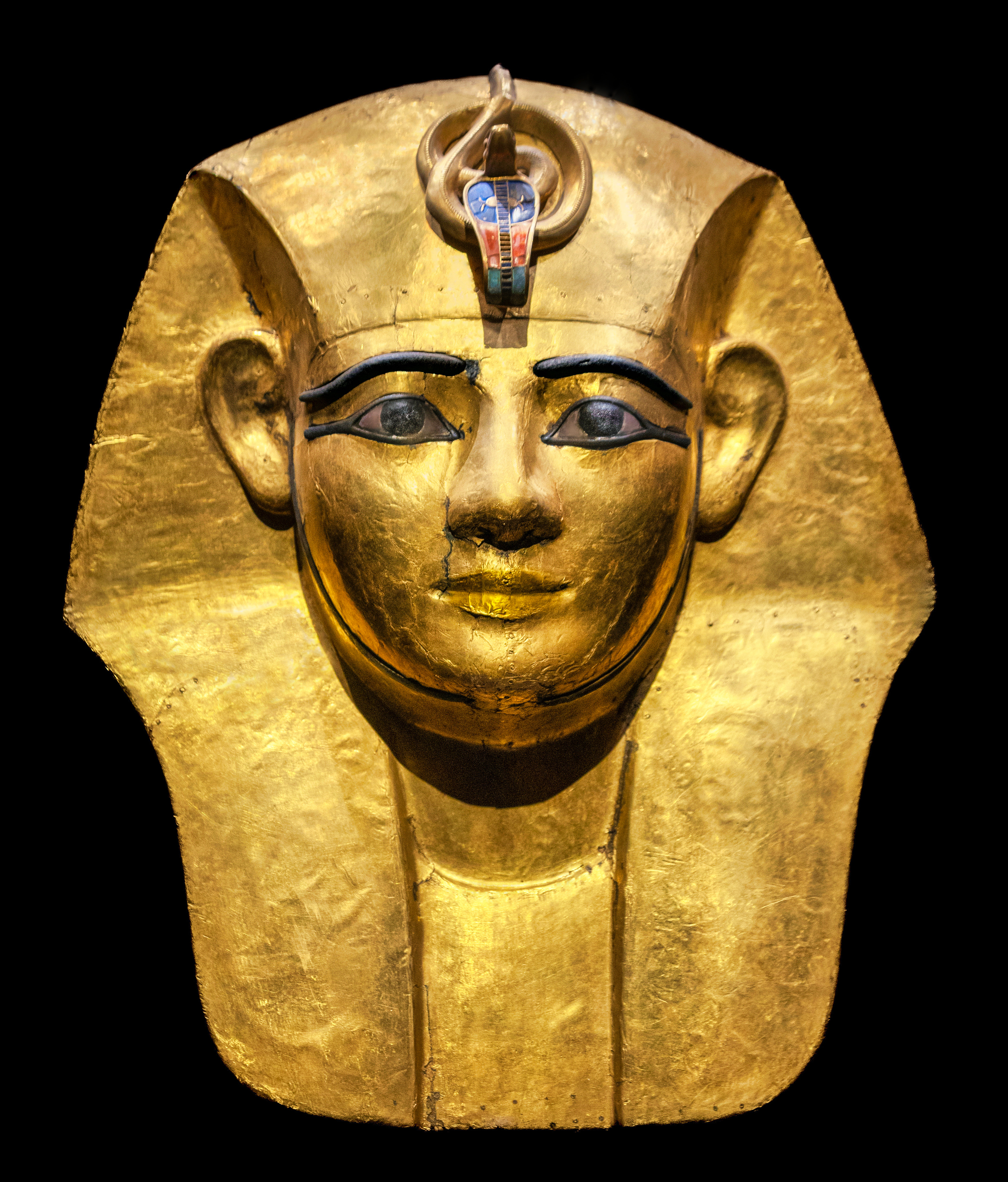
The restored head of Amenemope's gilded wooden coffin.

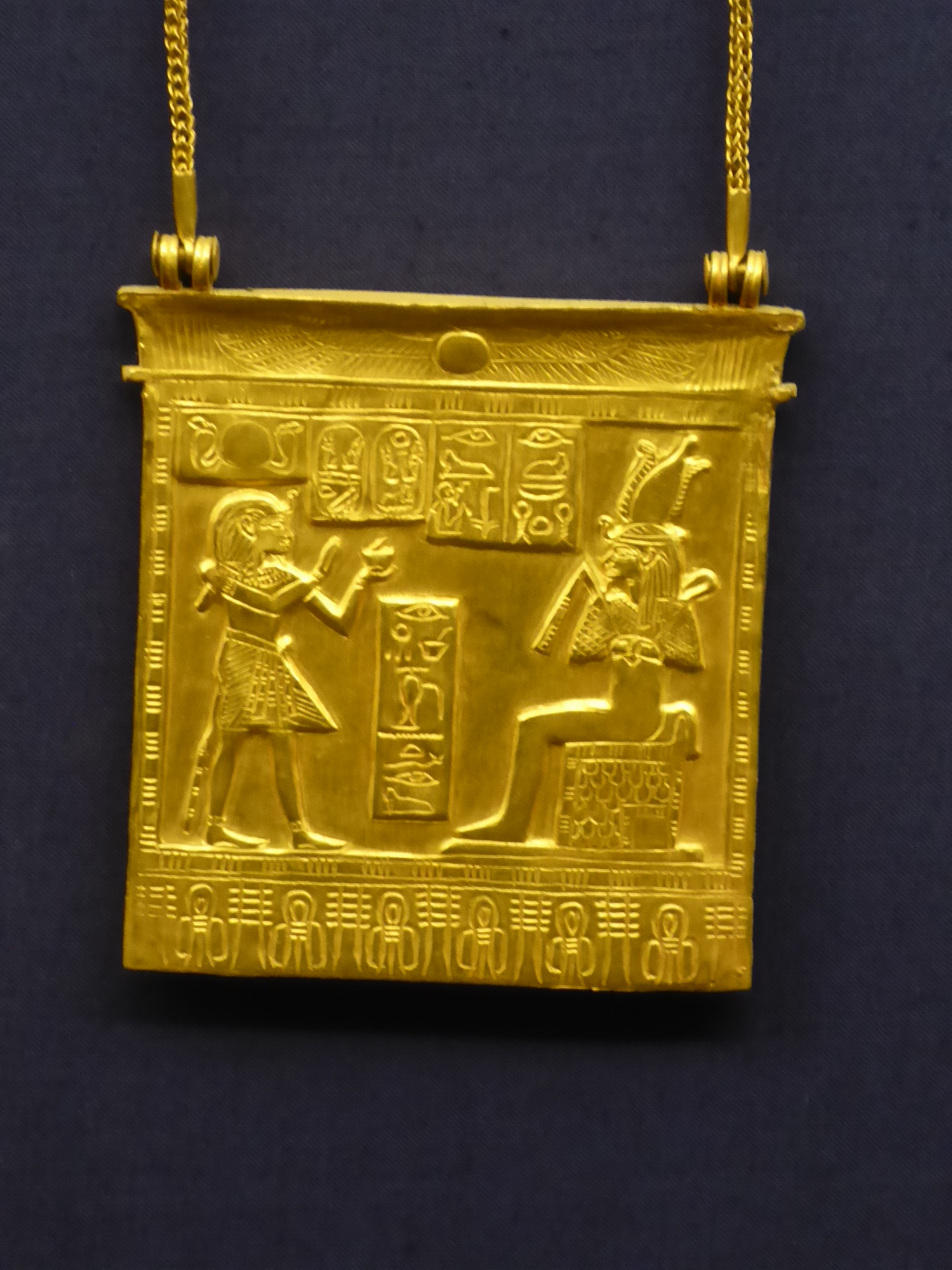
Amenemope's gold pectoral depicting him before Osiris.

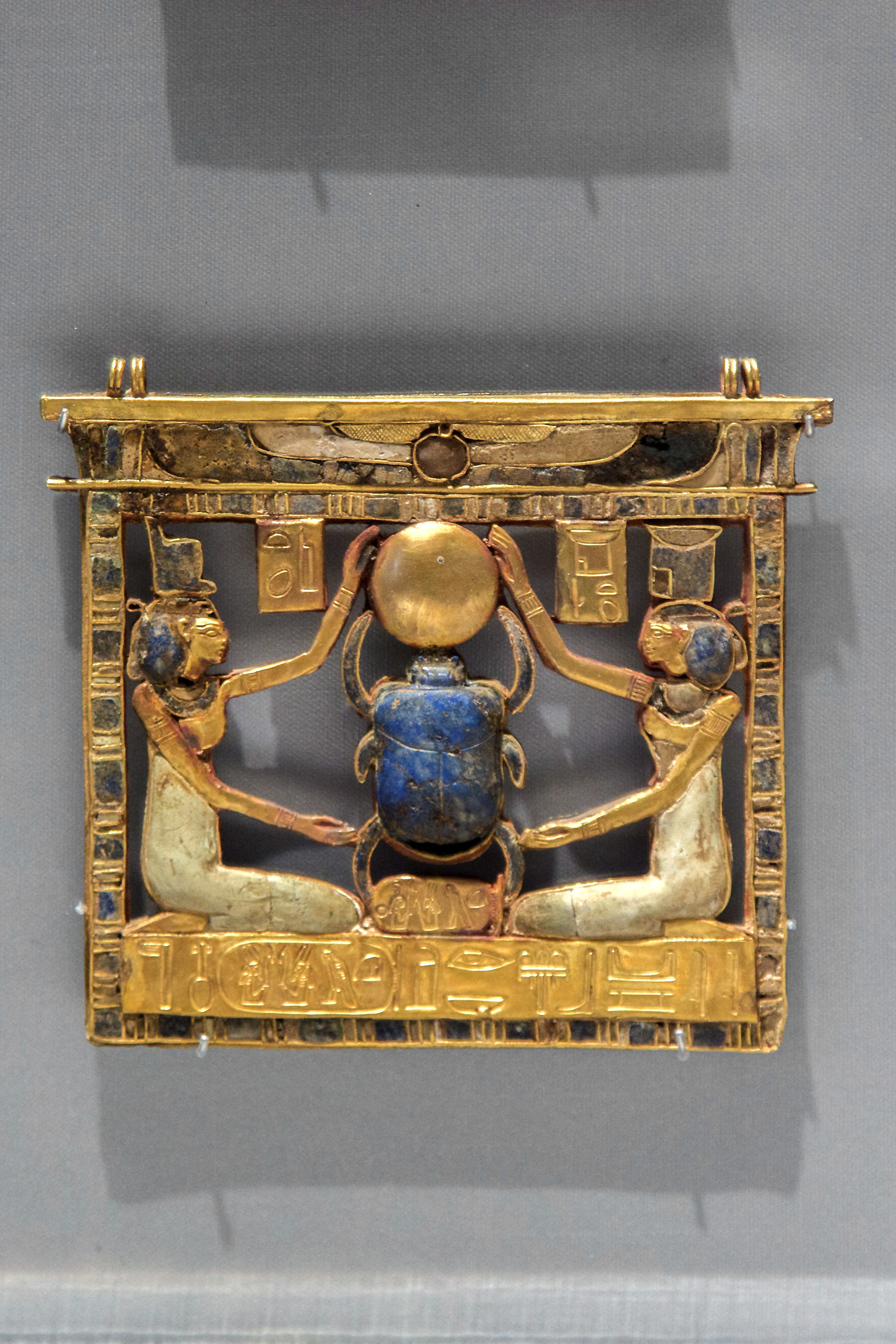
Amenemope's pectoral made from lapis lazuli and gold featuring Isis and Nephthys.

Amenemope was originally buried in the only chamber of a small tomb (NRT IV) in the royal necropolis of Tanis; however, a few years after his death, during the reign of Siamun, Amenemope was moved and reburied in NRT III--Psusennes I's own tomb--inside a tomb chamber once belonging to his purported mother Mutnedjmet and just next to Psusennes I. His undisturbed tomb was rediscovered by French Egyptologists Pierre Montet and Georges Goyon in April 1940, just a month before the Nazi invasion of France. Montet had to stop his excavation until the end of World War II, then resumed it in 1946 and later published his findings in 1958.

When the excavators entered the small burial chamber, they argued that it was originally made for queen Mutnedjmet. The chamber contained an uninscribed granite sarcophagus, some vessels including the canopic jars and the vessel once containing the water used for washing the mummy, and a heap of around 400 ushabtis; a wooden coffin covered with gold leaf was placed within the sarcophagus and contained Amenemope's mummy. On the mummy was found a gilt funerary mask, two pectorals, necklaces, bracelets, rings and a cloisonné collar. Four of these items bore the name of Psusennes I. The funerary masks depict the king as young, although Goyon stated that at the moment of discovery the masks had an expression of suffering and pleading, later softened after restoration. The mummy and funerary goods are now in Cairo Museum.

Amenemope was buried with far less opulence than his neighbour Psusennes I: for comparison, the latter was provided with a solid silver coffin and a solid gold mask, while the former's coffin and mask were merely gilt.

== Theft of bracelet ==
On September 16, 2025, it was reported that a gold bracelet with lapis lazuli beads belonging to Amenemope, was stolen from the restoration laboratory at the Egyptian Museum in Tahrir Square, Cairo. On September 18, it was reported that the bracelet had been stolen by a restoration worker employed with the museum, who sold the bracelet to a jeweler for 180,000 Egyptian pounds (US$3,700), who then sold it to a smelter who worked in a gold workshop in Cairo for 194,000 Egyptian pounds (US$4,000). By the time authorities arrived, the bracelet was already melted down. All involved individuals were placed under arrest, and the proceeds from the 2 sales of the bracelet, a total of 374,000 Egyptian pounds (US$7,700), were seized.

== See also ==
- List of pharaohs

== Bibliography ==
- von Beckerath, Jürgen (1999). Handbuch der ägyptischen Königsnamen. Münchner ägyptologische Studien, Heft 49, Mainz: Philip von Zabern. ISBN 978-3-8053-2591-2.
- Clayton, Peter (1994). Chronicle of the Pharaohs. Thames & Hudson Ltd.
- Derry, Douglas E. (1942). "Report on skeleton of King Amenemopet". Annales du Service des Antiquités de l'Égypte. 41.
- Goyon, Georges (1987). La Découverte des trésors de Tanis. Perséa. p. 608. ISBN 2-906427-01-2.
- Jansen-Winkeln, Karl (2006). Hornung, Erik; Krauss, Rolf; Warburton, David A. (eds.). Ancient Egyptian Chronology. Brill, Leiden/Boston. ISBN 978-90-04-11385-5.
- Kitchen, Kenneth A. (1996). The Third Intermediate Period in Egypt (1100–650 BC). Warminster: Aris & Phillips Limited. p. 608. ISBN 0-85668-298-5.
- Wente, Edward F. (1967). "On the Chronology of the Twenty-First Dynasty". Journal of Near Eastern Studies. 26 (3): 155–176. doi:10.1086/371908. S2CID 161532622.
