= Henenu (high steward) =

Egyptian noble

- High steward
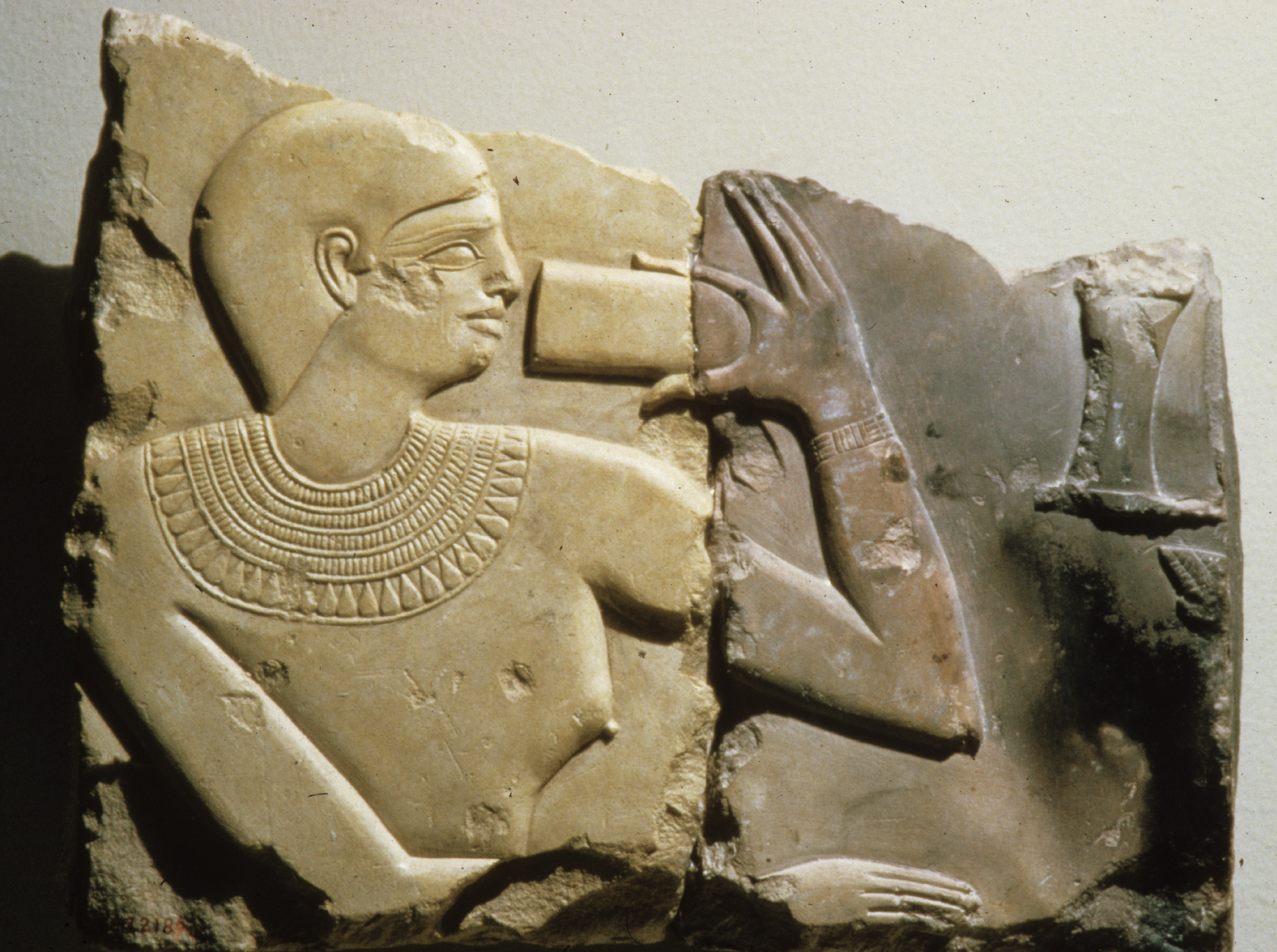
- Tenure: c. 2000 BC
- Dynasty: Eleventh Dynasty of Egypt
- Pharaoh: Mentuhotep III
- Burial: TT313, Theban Necropolis, Egypt

Hannu, Hennu, or Henenu (fl. c. 2000 BC) was an Egyptian noble, serving as High steward to Mentuhotep III in the 21st and 20th centuries BC. He reportedly re-opened the trade routes to Punt and Libya for Egypt. He was buried in a tomb in Deir el-Bahri, in the Theban Necropolis, which has been catalogued as TT313.

He is known from two inscriptions, in Wadi Hammamat no. 114 (c. 2000 BC) as hnw and in his Deir el-Bahari tomb as hnnw. It is unclear whether the two inscriptions refer to the same person. William Hayes postulated their identity while Herbert Winlock was hesitant to identify them. James Allen considers hnw a successor of hnnw as the pharaoh's m-r-pr.

== Travels ==
In the eighth year of the reign of Mentuhotep III, Hannu set out from Coptos at the head of an army of 3,000 people, crossed the mountainous Eastern Desert by way of Wadi Hammamat, and went on to the coast of the Red Sea.

=== Inscriptions ===
Hannu wrote of his expedition in stone. Under Sankhare (Mentuhotep III), whose name occurs as the 58th on the Table of Abydus, lived a functionary named Hannu, who records on a rock-inscription, in this same valley of Hammamat, some particulars of Mentuhotep's reign, from which it appears that the kings of this dynasty had dealings with Arabia; and the trade thus introduced directly by the valley route from Coptos to the Red Sea, seems to have revived the fallen fortunes of the old monarchy.

The first voyage to the land of Punt took place under Sankh-ka-ra. According to the words of the rock inscription, everything needful was wisely prepared for the expedition, for which the Pharaoh chose as leader and guide the noble Hannu, who gives us the following account of his voyage:

I was sent to conduct ships to the land of Punt, to fetch for Pharaoh sweet-smelling spices, which the princes of the red land collect out of fear and dread, such as he inspires in all nations. And I started from the city of Coptos.—And his Holiness gave the command that the armed men, who were to accompany me, should be from the south-country of the Thebai'd.'

After a destroyed passage of the inscription, of considerable length, of which, however, enough has been preserved to show us that the narration went on to state that the armed force was sent with the expedition to protect and defend it against the enemy, and that officers of the king, as well as stonecutters and other workpeople, accompanied it, Hannu continues:

Then I reached the Great Green (wȝḏ-wr). Then I made the ships and I dispatched them with all manner of things and made for them a great oblation of cattle, oxen and gazelles. When I returned from the Great Green, I performed what His Majesty commanded: I brought for him every product that I found on the shores of God's Land. I descended by WSg (unidentified) (and) Ro-Henu (Wadi Hammamat). I brought for him splendid blocks of stone for the temple statues.

=== Principal stations ===
In his account of the journey, Hannu speaks of five principal stations at which the wanderer halted, and man and beast (then probably the ass, the only beast of burden proved to have been used in those times) strengthened themselves for their further progress by enjoying the fresh drinking water. This is also the same road that, in the time of the Ptolemies and Romans, led from Coptos in an easterly direction to the harbour of Leucos Limen (now Qossier) on the Red Sea; the great highway and commercial thoroughfare of merchants of all countries, who traded in the wonderful products of Arabia and India; the bridge of the nations, which of old united Asia and Europe.

== See also ==
- List of explorers

== Bibliography ==
- J. H. Breasted, Ancient Records of Egypt, Part One, Chicago 1906, §§427-433
- Brugsch, H. K., & Smith, P. (1881). A history of Egypt under the pharaohs: Derived entirely from the monuments, to which is added a discourse on the exodus of the Israelites. Vol I. Page 135 - 139.
- Lionel Casson, The Ancient Mariners: Seafarers and Sea Fighters of the Mediterranean in Ancient Times, Princeton University Press 1991, p. 10
- Couyat, Jean and Montet, Pierre. Les inscriptions hieroglyphiques et hieratiques du Ouâdi Hammâmât. Cairo: Impr. de l'Institut français d'archéologie orientale, 1913, pp. 81-84
- Osbert Guy Stanhope Crawford, Antiquity, Antiquity Publications 1996, p. 241
- James P. Allen: The high officials of the early Middle Kingdom in: Strudwick, Nigel and Taylor, John H.: The Theban Necropolis Past, Present and Future, London 2003, 14 - 29.
- James P. Allen: Some Theban Officials of the Early Middle Kingdom in: Studies in Honor of William Kelly Simpson, Boston 1996, 1 - 26
- William Christopher Hayes: Career of the Great Steward Henenu under Nebhepetre Mentuhotpe, in: Journal of Egyptian Archaeology 35 (1949), 43 - 47.
