= Gamul Kebir =

Recreational dive site of Egypt in the Red Sea

Coordinates: 26°47.065′N 33°59.378′E

Gamul Kebir or Gamul Kebeer is a dive location just off the Egyptian Safaga Island in the Red Sea.
