= Georges Goyon =

French Egyptologist (1905–1996)

- Born: Georges Émile Goyon; 5 August 1905; Port Said, Egypt
- Died: 12 January 1996 (aged 90); Marseille, France
- Occupation: Egyptologist

Georges Émile Goyon (French pronunciation: [ʒɔʁʒ(ə) ɡɔjɔ̃]; 5 August 1905 – 12 January 1996) was a French Egyptologist. A senior fellow at the French National Centre for Scientific Research (CNRS), he was King Farouk's private archaeologist.

== Biography ==
Goyon was born in Port-Saïd, Egypt, in 1905, son of Henri Goyon, who worked for the Suez Canal Company. A student and disciple of Pierre Montet, Goyon led, early in his career, the construction of a gigantic granite monument at Ismaïlia for the Suez Canal Company.

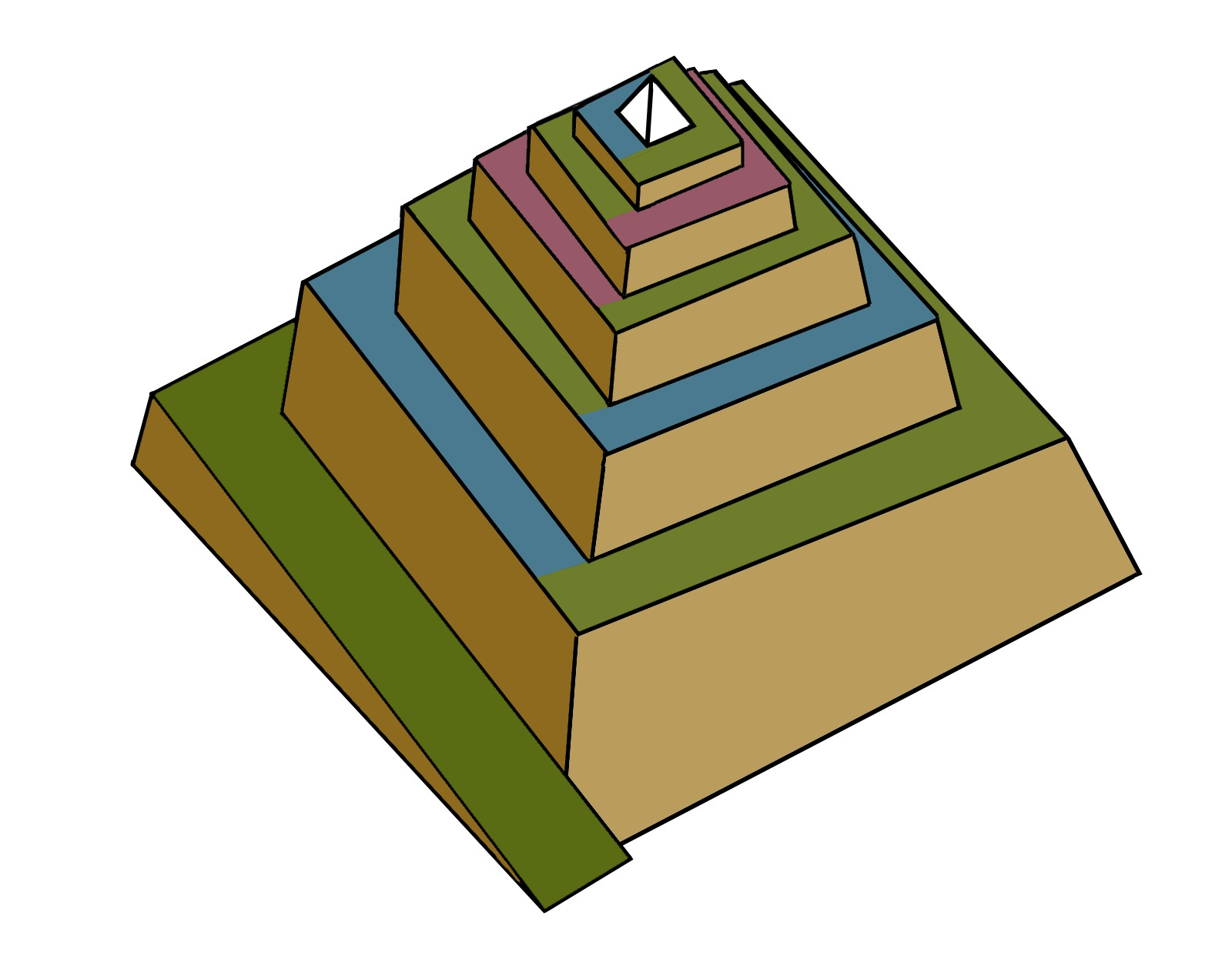
Ramp model by Georges Goyon

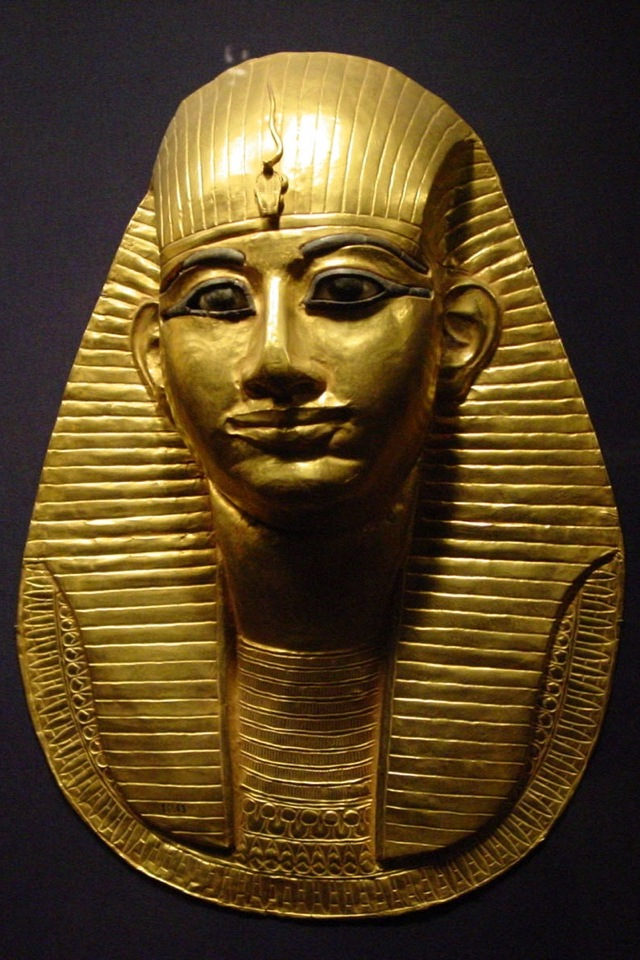
Funerary mask of pharaoh Amenemope, whose tomb was rediscovered by Montet and Goyon in 1940 at Tanis.

For twenty years he led the work of excavation of Tanis and inspected the stones of the Great Pyramid of Cheops to which he practically dedicated his life to, but also did a vast amount of work on the inscriptions and graffiti on the Great Pyramid, making a number of important discoveries especially in the 1940s.

In 1946, Goyon discovered an "abecedary incised on black granite" in Wadi Hammamat.

In 1977, he published a ramp model with a single spiral ramp for the construction of the Great Pyramid . The ramps are attached to the outer casing of the pyramid and completely wrap-around it.

== Publications ==
As author:

- Les inscriptions et graffiti des voyageurs sur la Grande Pyramide. Préf. de Ét. Drioton. , Société royale de géographie, Cairo, 1944.
- Le papyrus de Turin dit "des Mines d'or" et le Wadi Hammamat, Institut français d'archéologie orientale du Caire, 1949.
- Le Tombeau d'Ankhou à Saqqarah, Paul Geuthner, Paris, 1959.
- Le Secret des bâtisseurs des grandes pyramides - Khéops, Pygmalion Editions, 1983.
- La Découverte des trésors de Tanis, Éditions Perséa, 1987.

As a contributing author:

- Les constructions et le tombeau de Chéchanq III à Tanis, 1960.
- Histoire générale des techniques. Tome I, Les origines de la civilisation technique, Paris: Presses universitaires de France, 1962.

As an editor:

- Voyage en Égypte d'Anthoine Morison, 1697, Institut français d'archéologie orientale du Caire, 1976.
- Nouvelles inscriptions rupestres du Wadi Hammamat, Paris: Librairie d'Amérique et d'Orient (Imprimerie nationale), 1957.
