= Kathryn A. Bard =

American archaeologist (born 1957)

- Born: June 16, 1946 (age 80)

Academic background
- Education: Connecticut College; University of Michigan; Yale University; University of Toronto
- Thesis: An Analysis of the Predynastic Cemeteries of Nagada and Armant in Terms of Social Differentiation. The Origin of the State in Predynastic Egypt.

Kathryn A. Bard is an American archaeologist, academic, and author. She is a retired professor Emerita of Archaeology & Classical Studies from Boston University.

Bard is most known for her work on the origins of complex societies and early states in Northeast Africa, the Red Sea trading network during the Bronze and Iron Ages, as well as the late prehistory of Egypt and northern Ethiopia/Eritrea. Among her authored works are her publications in academic journals, including Journal of Archaeological Research, as well as books such as An Introduction to the Archaeology of Ancient Egypt. Moreover, she is the recipient of 1998 chairman's Award for Exploration from National Geographic Society.

== Education ==
Born in the United States, Bard earned her B.A. from Connecticut College in 1968. She obtained her M.F.A. from Yale University in 1971, followed by M.A. degrees from the University of Michigan in 1974 and the University of Toronto in 1976. In 1987, she completed her PhD in Egyptian Archaeology at the University of Toronto.

During her PhD she had her first excavation at an ancient Egyptian temple site at Karnak. They found evidence of four temples by Akhenaten, a heretical king who was the father of Tutankhamun and husband of Nefertiti. These temple foundations were demolished after Akhenaten died.

== Career ==
After her PhD Bard joined Boston University as an assistant professor in the Department of Archaeology in 1988. She participated in excavations, directing projects at sites HG & SH in the Hu-Semaineh Region, Egypt, in 1989 and 1991, and at Ona Enda Aboi Zewgé and Ona Nagast on Bieta Giyorgis hill, Aksum, from 1993 to 2002, co-directed with Rodolfo Fattovich of the University of Naples "L'Orientale". During the excavations at Aksum, Ethiopia, she and her team discovered the remains of high-status tombs and two elite residences. Among the artifacts at the Ona Enda Aboi Zewgé cemetery was a Roman wine jar from a vineyard in southern Gaul. Later, from 2001 to 2011, she and Fattovich directed excavations at Mersa/Wadi Gawasis, Egypt, uncovering eight-man-made caves at the ancient harbor site. These caves preserved ancient ship parts, papyrus ropes, equipment, and food remains. The excavations at the 4,000-year-old harbor revealed materials linked to maritime activities as well as hieroglyphic texts about these expeditions, confirming sea trading to Punt, located somewhere in the southern Red Sea region.

== Expeditions ==
In a 2005 expedition to Mersa/Wadi Gawasis, Egypt, Bard found remains of Egyptian seagoing vessels and hieroglyphic texts on stelae about royal expeditions to Punt, including cedar planks from Queen Hatshepsut's expedition in the 15th century BCE, demonstrating that Mersa/Wadi Gawasis was the port in Egypt from which trade to Punt some 1200 km south on the Red Sea was carried out.

== Research ==
Bard has contributed to research articles and books, drawing on details from her archaeological excavations. In 1999, she edited the Encyclopedia on the Archaeology of Ancient Egypt. In 2000, she authored a chapter in The Oxford History of Ancient Egypt, where she discussed the Naqada III phase (3200–3000 BC), focusing on Egypt's unification, evidence for the pre-1st Dynasty kings of Dynasty 0, and Early Dynastic rulers. In 2007 she and Fattovich co-edited Harbor of the Pharaohs to the Land of Punt. Archaeological Investigations at Mersa/Wadi Gawasis, 2001–2005, which synthesized their finds at this site. Their 2018 book, Seafaring Expeditions to Punt in the Middle Kingdom. Excavations at Mersa/Wadi Gawasis, Egypt, summarized the results of these excavations for the organization of these expeditions, and evidence at the harbor for the location of Punt, providing insights into the harbor's artifacts, use and maritime activities during the Middle Kingdom.

Bard's 2008 book, An Introduction to the Archaeology of Ancient Egypt, focused on aspects of ancient Egypt, from its prehistoric origins through the Pharaonic dynasties to the Greco-Roman period. The book also explored the culture, monuments, and civilization of ancient Egypt. In 2017, she authored an article in the Journal of Archaeological Research. This article explored the contrasting polities in Egypt and Nubia in the fourth millennium BC from the perspective of the political economy and strategies to power proposed by the dual-processual theory, and the territorial expansionist model, which helps explain where and when the early state emerged. In 2021, the two-volume Harbor of the Pharaohs to the Land of Punt II. Archaeological Investigations at Mersa/Wadi Gawasis, Egypt, 2006–2011 was published. Furthermore, in 2022, she authored a chapter titled "Middle Kingdom Egypt and Africa", which was published in The Oxford History of the Ancient Near East, Volume II.

== Awards and honors ==
- 1998 – Chairman's Award for Exploration, National Geographic Society
- 2010 – Fellow, American Academy of Arts & Sciences
- 2011 – The Boston University Lecture (honoring members of the faculty engaged in outstanding research), Boston University
- 2022 – MLE Award for Egyptology from El Museo Liceo Egipcio de Leòn in Spain

== Bibliography ==
=== Books ===
1. Bard, Kathryn A. (1994). From farmers to pharaohs: mortuary evidence for the rise of complex society in Egypt. Sheffield: Sheffield Acad. Press. ISBN 1-85075-387-3.
2. Bard, Kathryn A. (2015). An introduction to the archaeology of Ancient Egypt (Second ed.). Hoboken, NJ: Wiley-Blackwell. ISBN 978-0-470-67336-2.
3. Bard, Kathryn A.; Fattovich, Rodolfo (2018). Seafaring expeditions to Punt in the Middle Kingdom: excavations at Mersa/Wadi Gawasis, Egypt. Leiden; Boston: Brill. doi:10.1111/1095-9270.12380. ISBN 978-90-04-37960-2.

=== Selected articles ===
1. Bard, Kathryn A. (1987). "The Geography of Excavated Predynastic Sites and the Rise of Complex Society". Journal of the American Research Center in Egypt. 24: 81–93. doi:10.2307/40000263. JSTOR 40000263.
2. Bard, Kathryn A.; Fattovich, Rodolfo; Manzo, Andrea; Perlingieri, Cinzia (1997). "Archaeological Investigations at Bieta Giyorgis (Aksum), Ethiopia: 1993–1995 Field Seasons". Journal of Field Archaeology. 24 (4): 387–403. doi:10.2307/530673. JSTOR 530673.
3. Bard, Kathryn A.; Fattovich, Rodolfo (2011). "The Middle Kingdom Red Sea Harbor at Mersa/Wadi Gawasis". Journal of the American Research Center in Egypt. 47: 105–129. ISSN 0065-9991. JSTOR 24555387.
4. Bard, Kathryn A.; Fattovich, Rodolfo (March 2015). "Mersa/Wadi Gawasis and Ancient Egyptian Maritime Trade in the Red Sea". Near Eastern Archaeology. 78 (1): 4–11. doi:10.5615/neareastarch.78.1.0004.
