= Journal of the American Research Center in Egypt =

- Cover of the journal used from Vol.39 (2002) onwards
- Discipline: Egyptian history
- Language: English, French, German
- Edited by: Emily Teeter

Publication details
- History: 1962-present
- Publisher: American Research Center in Egypt
- Frequency: Annual

Standard abbreviations
- ISO 4: J. Am. Res. Cent. Egypt

Indexing
- ISSN: 0065-9991

Links
- Journal homepage

The Journal of the American Research Center in Egypt (JARCE) is an academic journal published for the American Research Center in Egypt by Lockwood Press. It was established in 1962 to publish research "into the art, archaeology, languages, history, and social systems of the Egyptian people." As is usual for Egyptological journals, it accepts articles written in English, French, or German.

== Editors ==
The following Egyptologists have served as editor-in-chief for JARCE since its establishment in 1962:

- Emily Teeter, University of Chicago (editor from 2019 to present)
- Peter Piccione, College of Charleston (interim editor for 2018)
- Eugene Cruz-Uribe, Indiana University East (editor from 2005 to 2018)
- Ann Macy Roth, Howard University (editor from 2002 to 2004)
- John L. Forster, Roosevelt University (editor-in-chief from 1984 to 2001)
- Gerald E. Kadish, State University of New York at Binghamton (editor from 1973 to 1983)
- Klaus Baer, Oriental Institute, University of Chicago (editor from 1971 to 1972)
- Alan R. Schulman, Queens College, New York (editor from 1967 to 1970)
- Edward L. B. Terrace, Museum of Fine Arts, Boston (editor from 1962 to 1966)

== See also ==
- List of history journals
