= Hydreuma =

Enclosed watering station in Roman Arabia

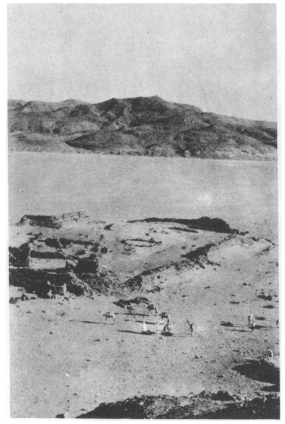
Ruins of the Hydreuma at Paneion (Πανεῖον), El-Kanayis Egypt

In Roman Egypt, a hydreuma (plural hydreumata) was an enclosed (and often fortified) "watering station" along trade routes in dry regions. A hydreuma was a manned and fortified watering hole or way station along a caravan route, providing a man-made oasis.

== Etymology ==
The term Hydreuma only refers to wells, not to any other source of water. Water-tanks were known as hydreia or lakkos; technically the term hydreuma wasn't being applied to these forts. An example of the other usages of the term "hydreuma" are the water basins of Roman era-Kharga Oasis and outlying parts of villages with wells there. The Arabs called these Roman fortified wells dêr (monastery), kariyah (village) or diminutive kurêyah or wekâla (caravanserai). The Egyptian term for well was Pmoun.

== Construction, use and history ==
Hydreuma are fortified water supply posts in the Eastern Sahara. According to Strabo they had wells or cisterns:

- A hydreuma had either one large cistern or several smaller ones, and they could be supplied by runoff from neighbouring mountains. The cisterns were built out of bricks or stones, coated with waterproof plaster, and almost certainly covered to protect them from evaporation. Some may have received water conveyed through channels from nearby springs. In at least one hydreuma, hydraulic tanks and troughs were found. Wells were located at the bottom of funnels dug into the sand, and later wells often included water sweeps or water wheels. The use of water wheels in hydreumata is unproven, however.
- Commonly, the fortifications formed square-shaped buildings with dimensions of 30–60 metres (98–197 ft) with one gate to the outside, although circular or unfortified or embanked hydreumata are also known. The structures had one gate to the outside, towers with stairs at the corners, and several rooms facing an interior courtyard that contained the wells or cisterns. The rooms, presumably covered with roofs made out of plant material, were presumably used as barracks while animals remained within the courtyard. The hydreumata were situated along trade routes.

Apart from water supply, they might have been used as trading monitoring posts for tax collection purposes, as garrisons and also as military-representative structures. Some hydreumata were used as water sources to irrigate land, and to supply water for the port of Berenice Troglodytica (Berenike). The fortifications served to protect the well from desert sand.

These forts are attested by Pliny, in texts found through the Eastern Desert, reports of individual transports, as well as in the Antonine Itinerary and the Tabula Peutingeriana. While Strabo mentions that the first ones were built by Ptolemy II, most were built by the Romans between the first and second century AD on the old Egyptian routes between the Nile Valley and the Red Sea, after the earlier Ptolemaic trade route between Edfu and Berenike was largely abandoned. Reportedly, Emperor Vespasian fortified many hydreumata, which thus became praesidia, presumably because indigenous people began to use camels for raids. They were later often repaired or reconstructed. Beginning in the second and third century, activity declined probably due to demographic and economic changes caused by the Parthian Wars, Antonine Plague and the Crisis of the Third Century and the forts were abandoned during the sixth century. Today many are either destroyed or buried by sand, some were restored in the early 20th century.

== Roads with hydreumata ==
They are found along the old roads that lead to Berenike and Myos Hormos. These ports were part of the Roman-Indian trade routes and were active during the era of the early Roman Empire, when as many as hundred ships departed from Berenike every year, and are mentioned in ancient accounts like the Periplus of the Erythraean Sea. Traffic through these routes increased after the discovery of the monsoon winds and was mostly by caravan, without wagons. These ports were not self-sufficient, instead relying on supplies brought to them overland from the Nile Valley, as contemporary records indicate. The roads were not paved nor did they feature milestones, sometimes they were not even cleared of rocks on the roadway. Numerous branch roads connected the roads with each other and with sites like quarries. Caravans on average would have reached each hydreuma after two days from the last one; Strabo reports that some travel occurred during night.

The two roads to Berenike and Myos Hormos have distinct hydreuma architectures, which may be due to them having different strategic importance to the Romans, as the Koptos-Myos Hormos route may have doubled as an internal military border. Additionally, there are non-hydreuma buildings along the roads, as well as gold mines.

== Examples ==
Map of roads in Roman Egypt

Among the hydreumata are:

- Bi'r Nakheil, el-Duwi (Simiou; which also featured semicircular towers), Seyala, el-Hamrah, el-Zerkah (Maximianon, 26.000957259884206°N 33.78746843705496°E), Bir Umm Fawakhir, el-Hammamat (Porsou), el-Muweih (Krokodilo, 25°56.56′N 33°24.08′E), Qasr el-Banat, el-Laqeita (Phoenicon, after a palm grove that still exists today) and el-Matula on the road from Myos Hormos (Quseir) to Koptos (Qift).
- Along the road from Berenike to Koptos one finds Wadi Abu Greiya (Troglodyticum, sometimes misread as Vetus Hydreuma), Novum Hydreuma (sometimes identified as Wadi el-Khashir, which is improbable), Abu Ghusun (Cabalsi), Apollonos, ad-Dweig (Falacro), Wadi Gerf (Aristonis), Jovis (which could be either Bezah or Wadi Abu Greiya), Wadi Dagbagh (Compasi, of unknown etymology), Aphrodito (25°36.36′N 33°37.38′E; with an associated rock shelter) and Khasm el-Menih (Didyme). Another hydreuma is off-road at Siket (23°55.88′N 35°24.46′E).
- On the Via Hadriana between Berenike and Antinoöpolis there are hydreumata at Abu Sha'ar al-Bahri (27°58.64′N 33°12.90′E), Abu Sha'ar al-Qibli (27°22.14′N 33°37.98′E), Abu Gariya (26°56.00′N 33°43.72′E), Wadi Safaga (26°37.05′N 33°58.55′E), Quei (26°20.99′N 34°07.10′E), Marsa Dabr/Marsa Nabiyah (25°18.86′N 34°44.24′E) and Wadi Lahma (24°09.92′N 35°21.81′E). There are also forts, cisterns, camps and other kinds of stop along this road.

Other small hydreumata lie along the Edfu (Apollonopolis Magna)-Berenike road at Abbad, Abu Rahal, Abu Midrik (24°55.20′N 33°40.84′E), Rod al-Legah, Seyrig and Umm Gariya. Their occurrence has been reported from west of the Nile as well, in particular late Roman oasis fortifications, but not from Numidia. In the Libyan Desert, Roman-era centenaria resemble hydreumata but were fortified grain-houses.
