= Safaga =

City on the Red Sea coast of Egypt

Safaga سفاجا
- City
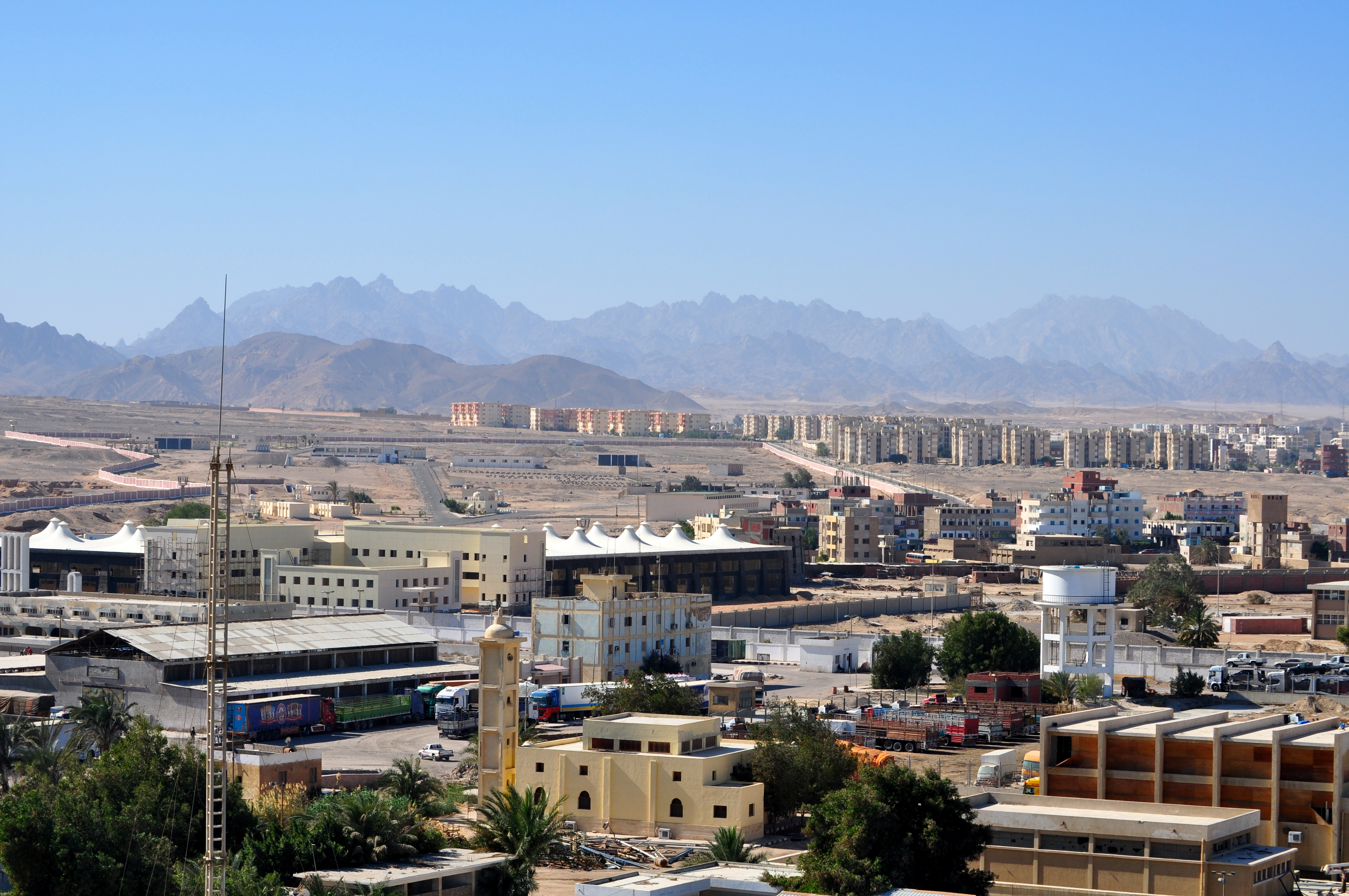
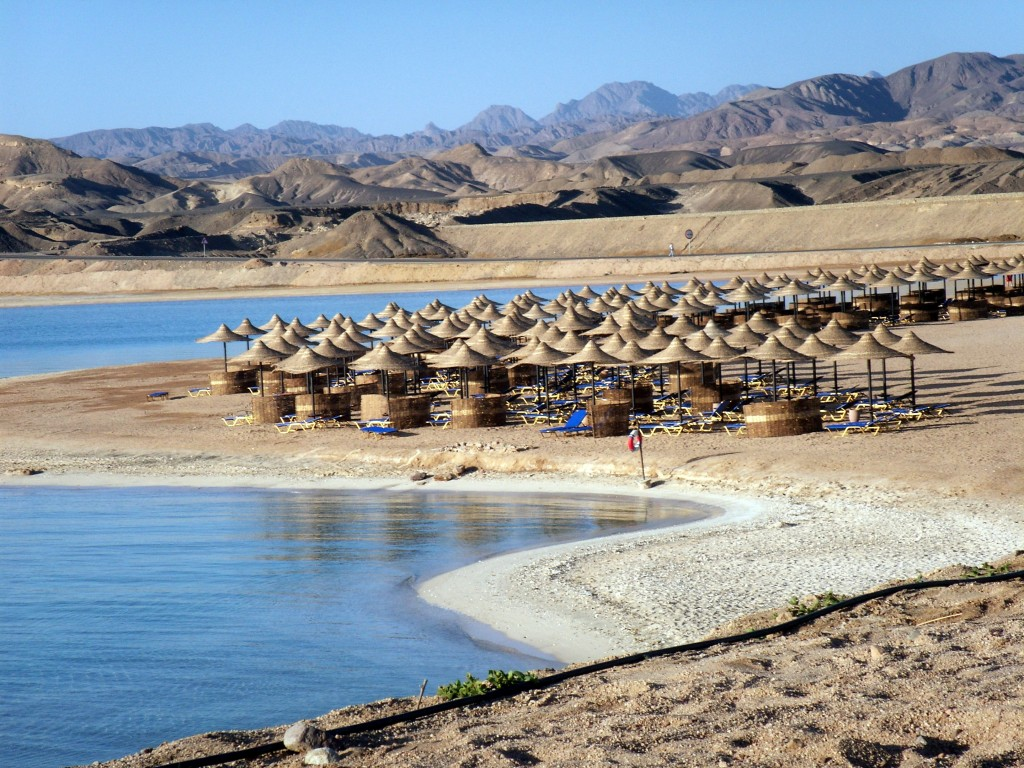
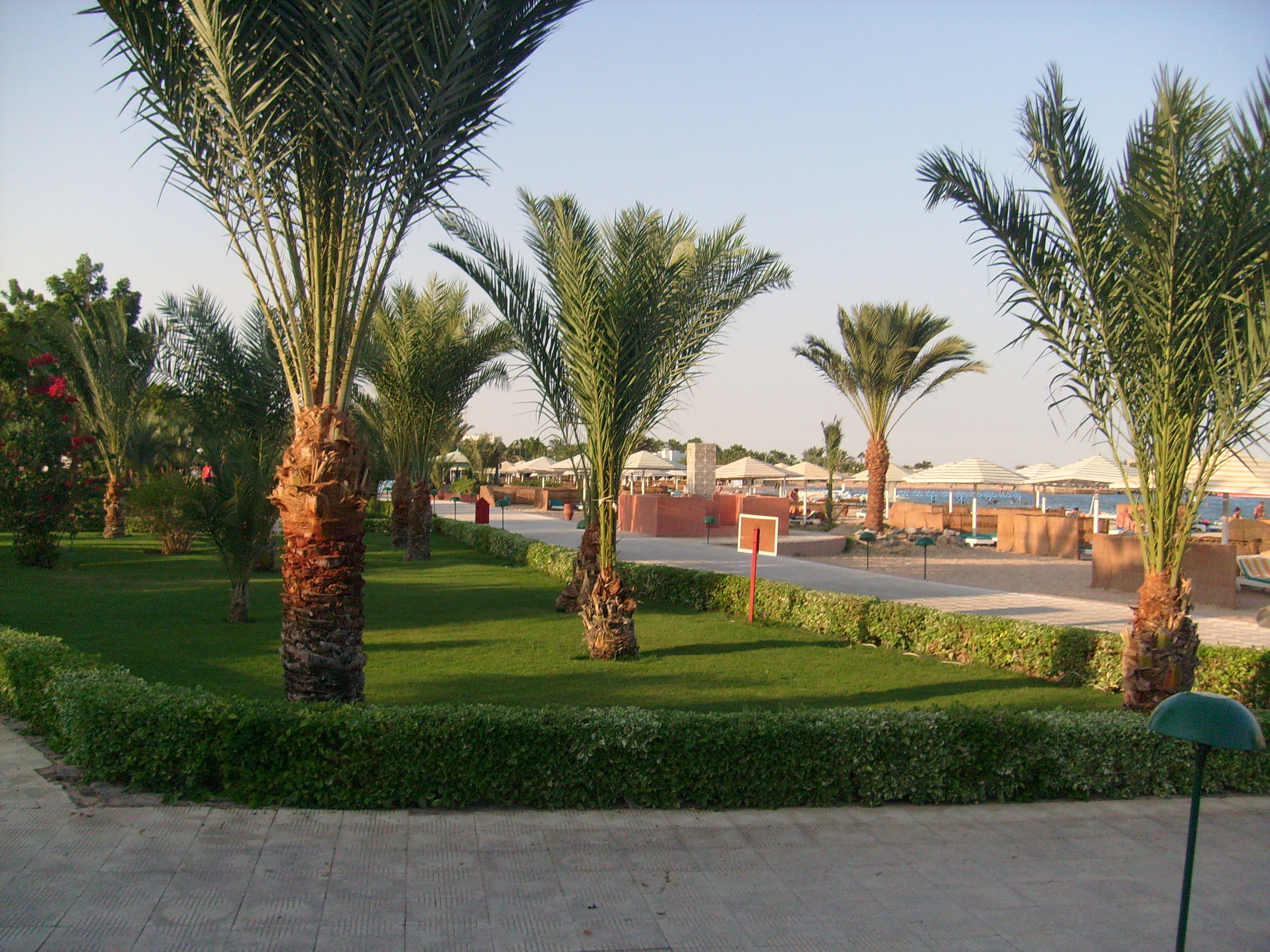
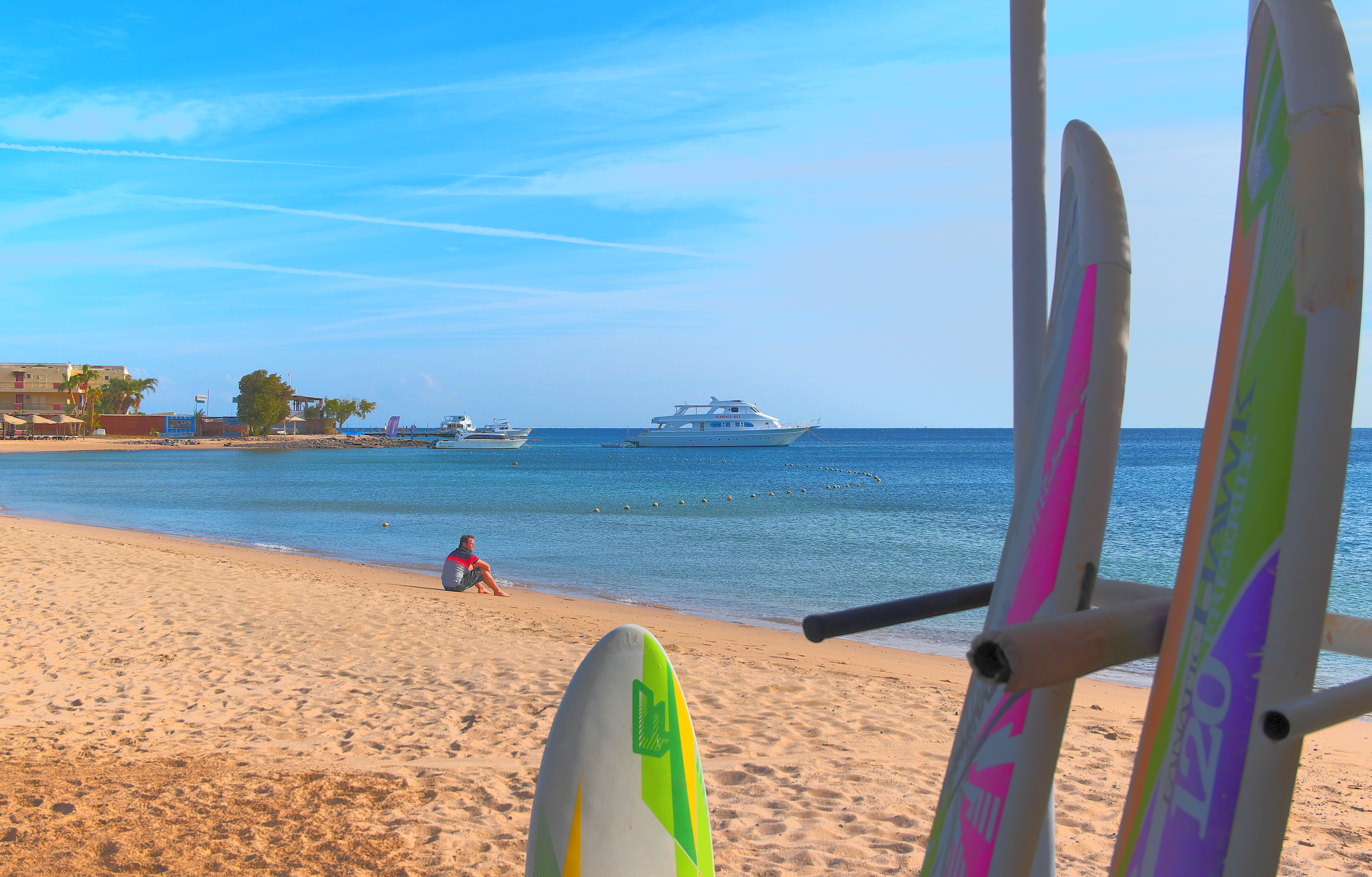
- Overview of Safaga

- Location in Egypt
- Coordinates: 26°45′27″N 33°56′12″E
- Country: Egypt
- Governorate: Red Sea

Area
  - Total: 5,285 km^{2} (2,041 sq mi)
- Elevation: 23 m (75 ft)

Population (2021)
  - Total: 55,299
  - Density: 10.46/km^{2} (27.10/sq mi)
- Time zone: UTC+2 (EET)
  - Summer (DST): UTC+3 (EEST)

Safaga (Egyptian Arabic: سفاجا, Safāgā, pronounced [sæˈfæːɡæ]), also known as Port Safaga (بور سفاجا, Būr Safāgā), is a port city in Egypt, on the coast of the Red Sea, located 53 km (33 mi) south of Hurghada. The city is also a tourist area that consists of several bungalows and rest houses. Having numerous phosphate mines, it is regarded as the phosphates export center. A paved road of 164 km (102 mi) connects Safaga to Qena of Upper Egypt.

== History ==
The town was founded between 282 BC and 268 BC, by Satyrus (Ancient Greek: Σάτυρος). It was called Philotera (Ancient Greek: Φιλωτέρα) in honor of the deceased sister of the Pharaoh Ptolemy II Philadelphus. Stephanus of Byzantium write that it was also called Philoterida (Ancient Greek: Φιλωτερίδα).

Safaga City is considered one of the most important therapeutic tourist centres, as special medical researches have proved the potential of attracting international tourism to Safaga.

Safaga was a merchant port for many years. The town has a small tourism industry, specialising in scuba diving. It was the host of the 1993 Red Sea World Windsurfing Championships.

== Climate ==
Köppen-Geiger climate classification system classifies its climate as hot desert (BWh), as the rest of Egypt.

The highest record temperature was 46 °C (115 °F) on July 30, 2002, while the lowest record temperature was 0 °C (32 °F) on February 2, 1993.

Climate data for Safaga
Month	Jan	Feb	Mar	Apr	May	Jun	Jul	Aug	Sep	Oct	Nov	Dec	Year
Record high °C (°F)	33 (91)	34 (93)	38 (100)	42 (108)	43 (109)	46 (115)	46 (115)	44 (111)	43 (109)	43 (109)	35 (95)	34 (93)	46 (115)
Mean daily maximum °C (°F)	21.9 (71.4)	22.7 (72.9)	26.1 (79.0)	28.1 (82.6)	31.7 (89.1)	33.8 (92.8)	34 (93)	34.4 (93.9)	32.3 (90.1)	30.2 (86.4)	27 (81)	23.4 (74.1)	28.8 (83.9)
Daily mean °C (°F)	16.3 (61.3)	16.8 (62.2)	20.4 (68.7)	22.5 (72.5)	26.2 (79.2)	28.6 (83.5)	29 (84)	29.6 (85.3)	27.6 (81.7)	25.2 (77.4)	21.6 (70.9)	17.9 (64.2)	23.5 (74.2)
Mean daily minimum °C (°F)	10.7 (51.3)	11 (52)	14.8 (58.6)	16.9 (62.4)	20.7 (69.3)	23.5 (74.3)	24.1 (75.4)	24.9 (76.8)	22.9 (73.2)	20.3 (68.5)	16.3 (61.3)	12.4 (54.3)	18.2 (64.8)
Record low °C (°F)	1 (34)	0 (32)	1 (34)	8 (46)	10 (50)	12 (54)	15 (59)	13 (55)	12 (54)	11 (52)	6 (43)	3 (37)	0 (32)
Average precipitation mm (inches)	0 (0)	0 (0)	0 (0)	0 (0)	0 (0)	0 (0)	0 (0)	0 (0)	0 (0)	1 (0.0)	1 (0.0)	0 (0)	2 (0)
Average rainy days	0	0	0	0	1	0	0	0	0	0	0	0	1
Mean daily sunshine hours	9	10	10	10	11	12	13	12	11	10	10	9	11
Source 1: Climate-Data.org (altitude: 18m), Weather2Travel for rainy days and sunshine
Source 2: Voodoo Skies for record temperatures

Safaga mean sea temperature
Jan	Feb	Mar	Apr	May	Jun	Jul	Aug	Sep	Oct	Nov	Dec
23 °C (73 °F)	22 °C (72 °F)	22 °C (72 °F)	23 °C (73 °F)	25 °C (77 °F)	26 °C (79 °F)	28 °C (82 °F)	29 °C (84 °F)	28 °C (82 °F)	27 °C (81 °F)	26 °C (79 °F)	24 °C (75 °F)

== Port ==
Safaga port is also a gateway for Duba port to some hajj pilgrims or travelers to Mecca, by ferries.

== See also ==
- List of cities and towns in Egypt
- Gamul Kebir
