= Red Sea Riviera =

Egypt's eastern coastline along the Red Sea

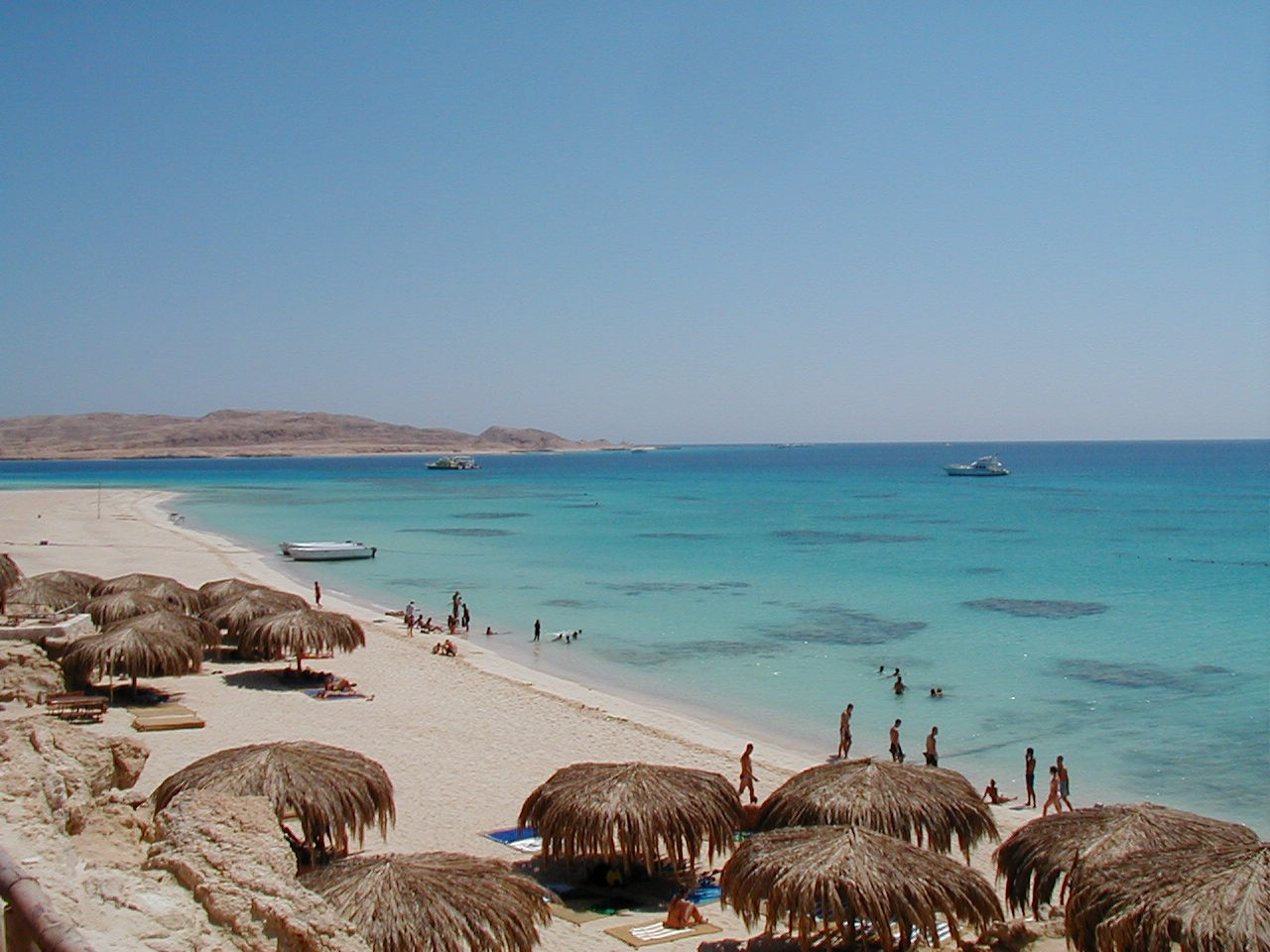
Al-Mahmeya National Protected Park

The Red Sea Riviera, Egypt's eastern coastline along the Red Sea, consists of cities and resort cities on the western shore of the Gulf of Aqaba and along the eastern coast of mainland Egypt, south of the Gulf of Suez.

The combination of a favorable climate, warm sea, thousands of kilometers of shoreline, and abundant natural and archaeological points of interest makes this stretch of Egypt's coastline a popular national and international tourist destination. There are numerous National Parks along the Red Sea Riviera, both underwater and on land. Desert and marine life are protected by several laws, and visitors may be subject to heavy fines for not abiding.

== List of cities and resort towns ==
Listed in geographic order, from north to south:

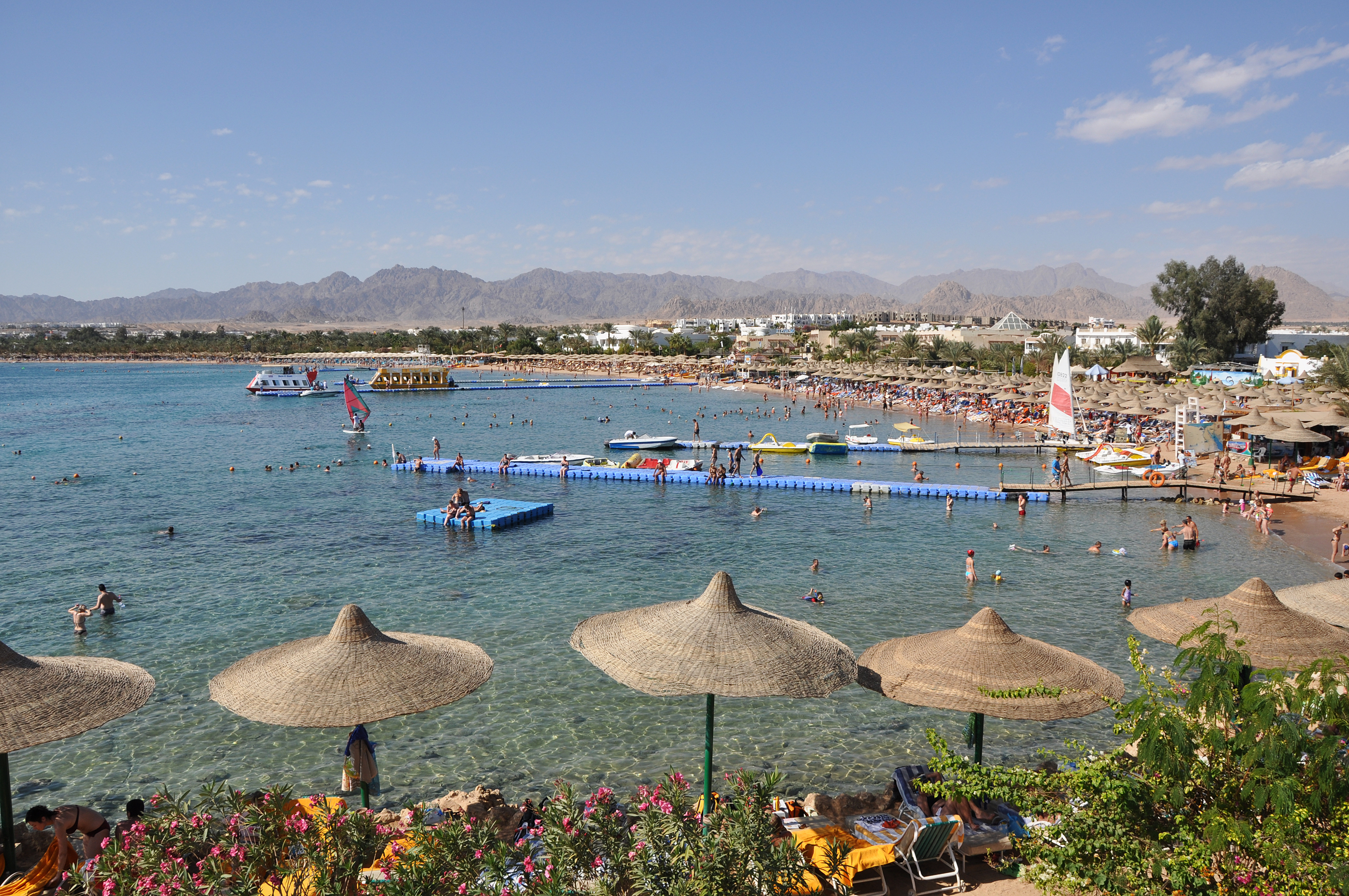
Naama beach in Sharm El Sheikh

Hurghada Marina

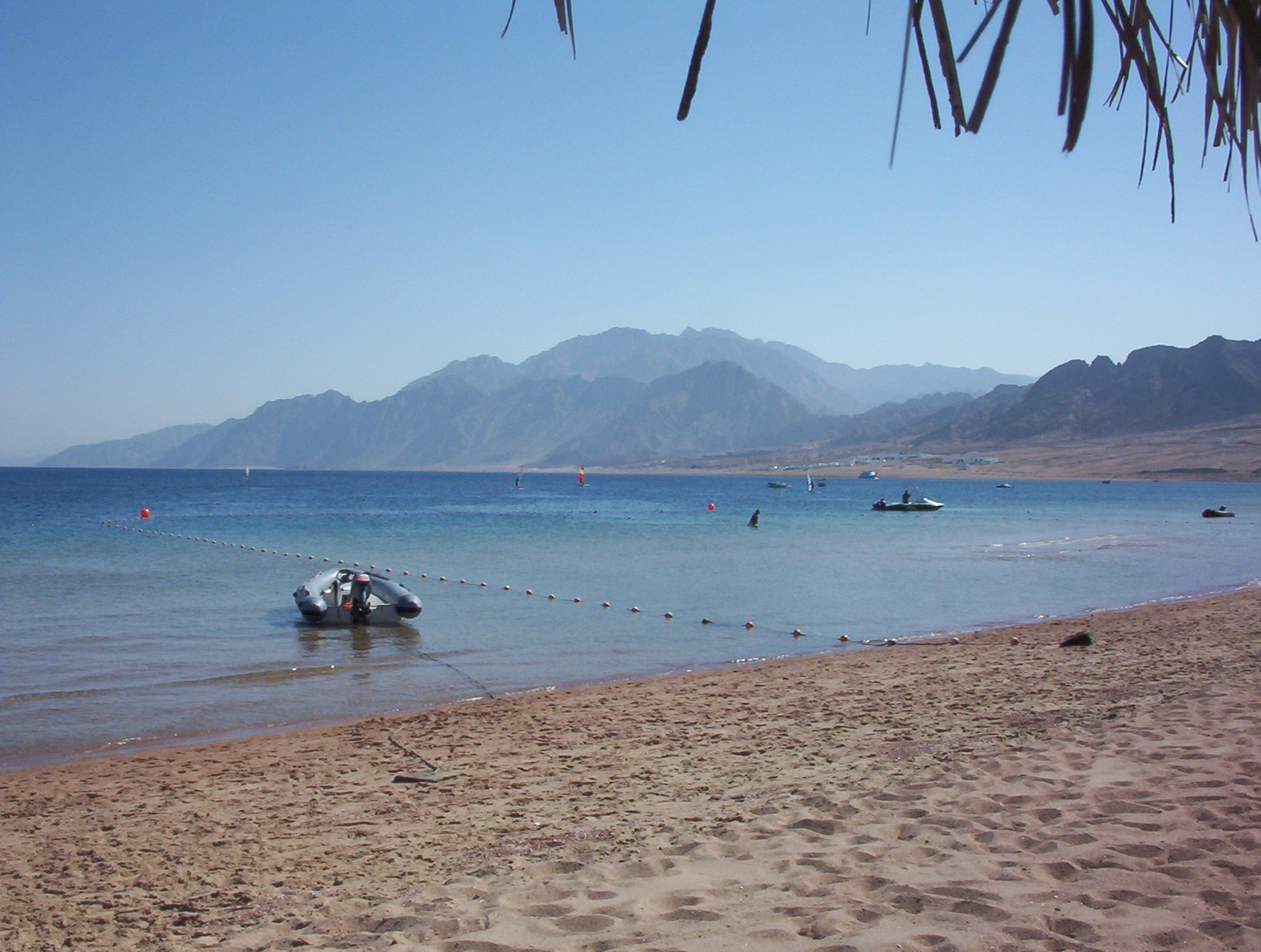
Dahab shoreline

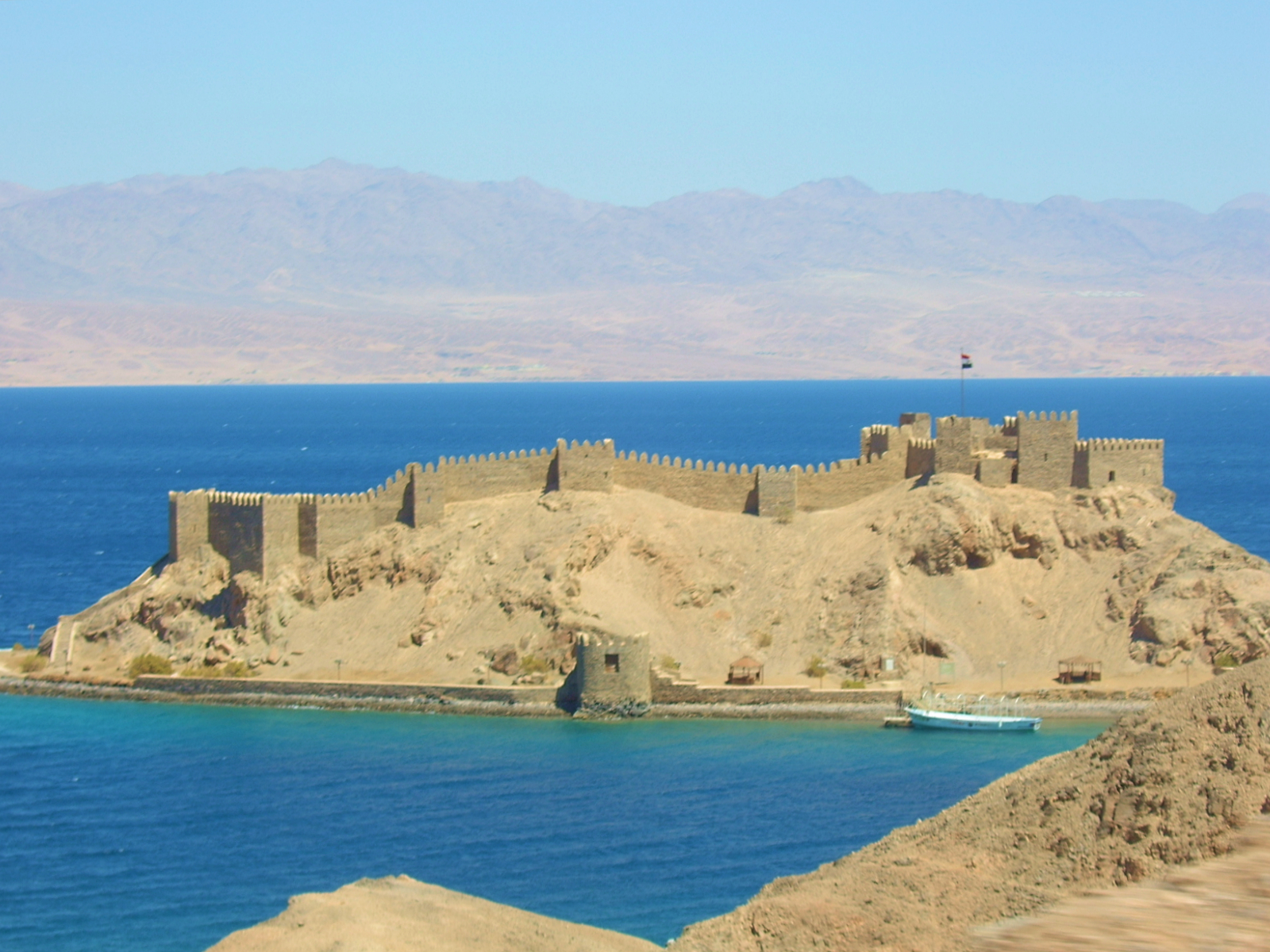
Citadel of Saladin on Pharaoh's Island

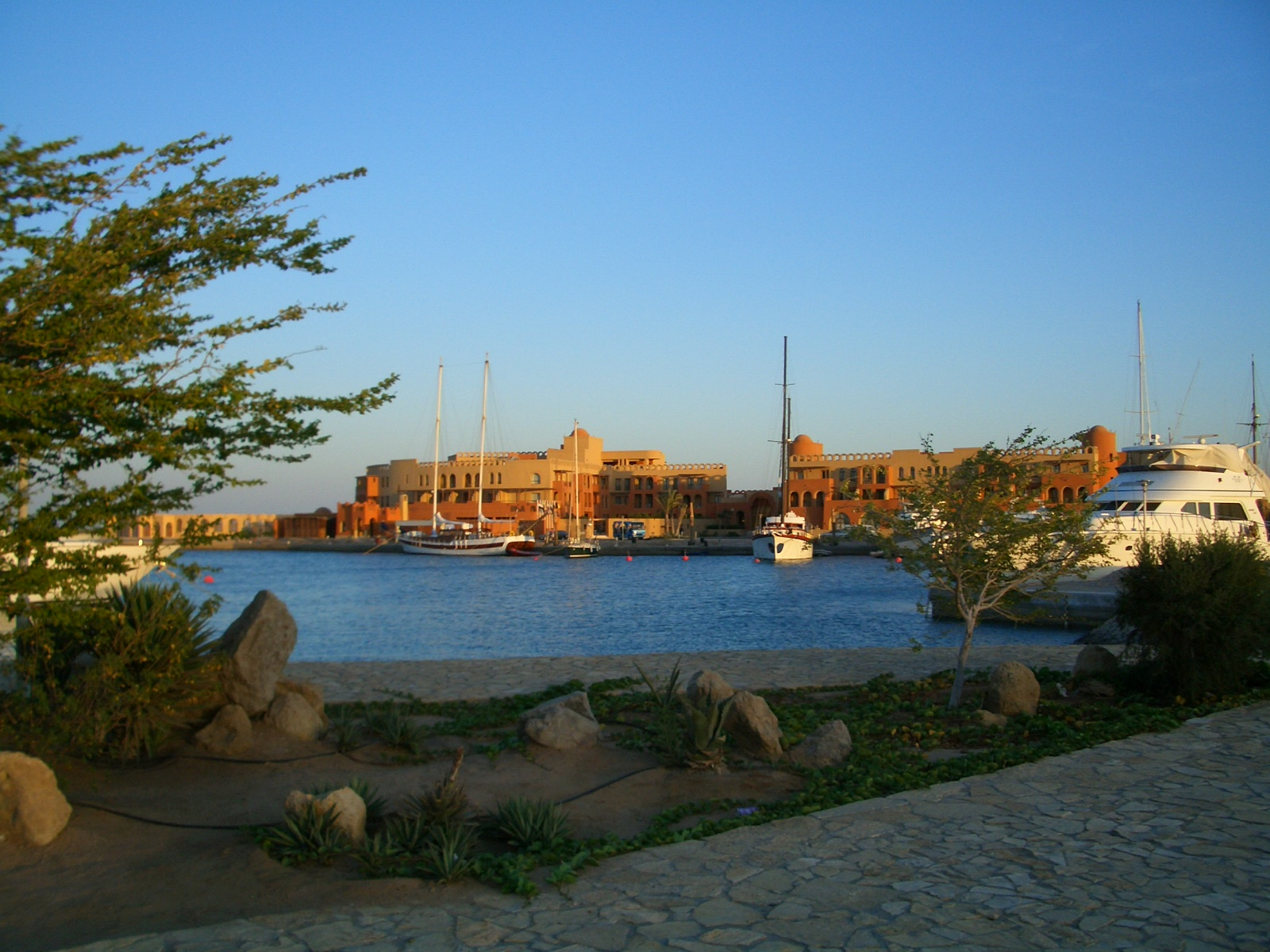
View of El Gouna

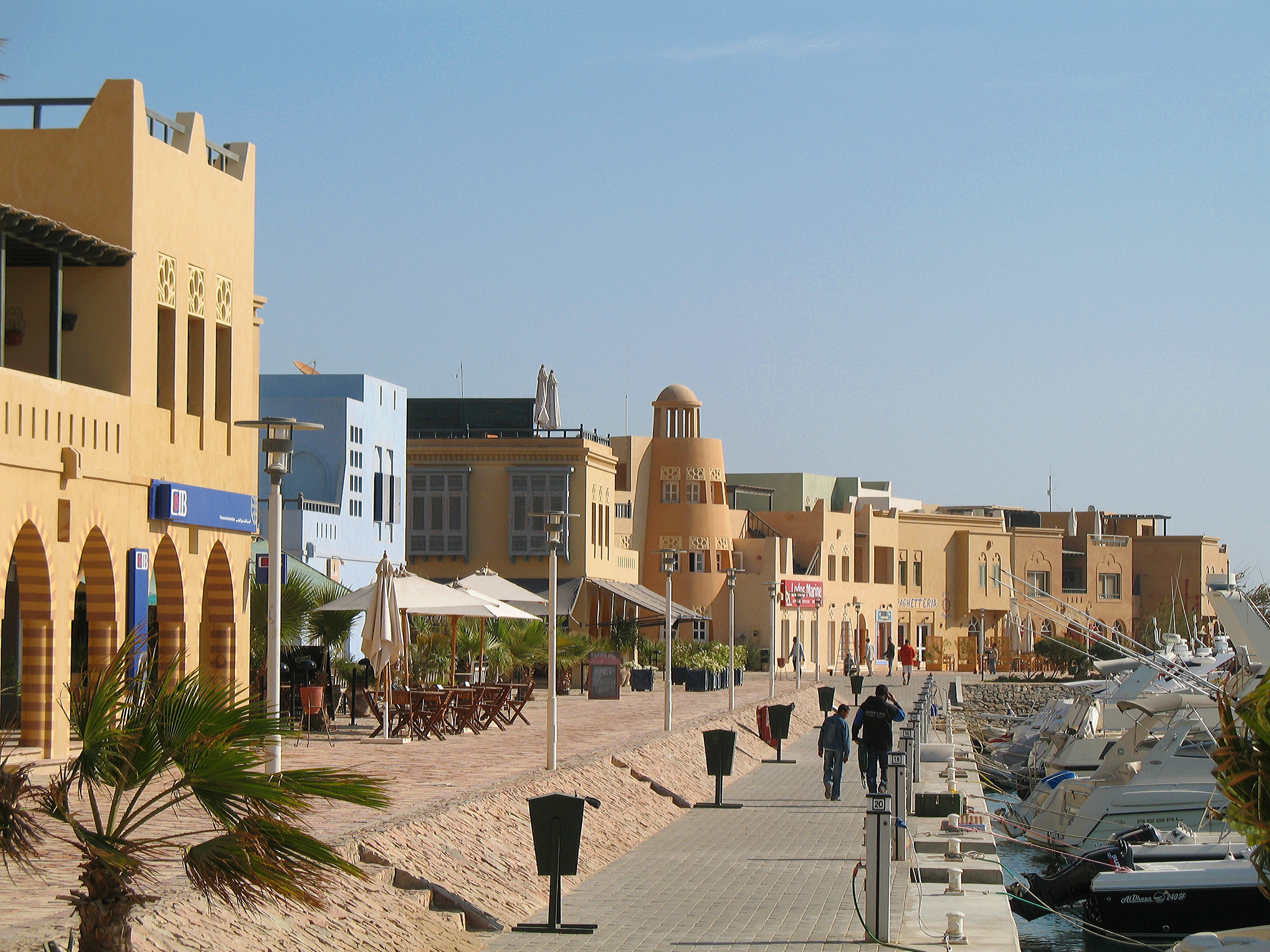
Abu Tig Marina, El Gouna

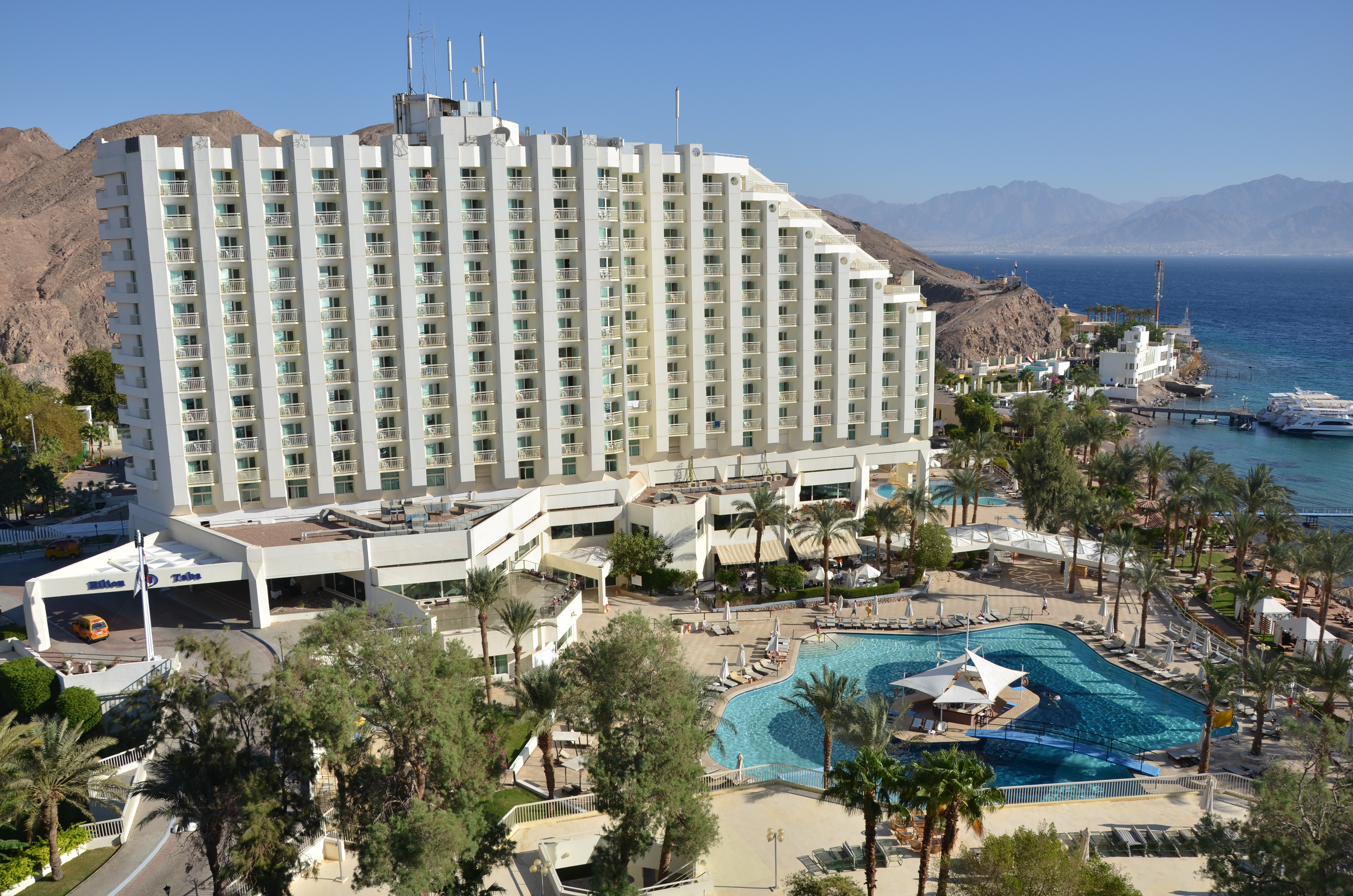
Taba Hotel and Nelson Village, Taba

On the Sinai Peninsula:

- Taba
- Nuweiba
- Dahab
- Straits of Tiran
- Sharm El Sheikh
- Ras Muhammad National Park

Sinai's nearby islands include:

- Pharaoh's Island
- Sanafir Island
- Tiran Island

On the Western Red Sea shore:

- Abu Shar
- Abu Soma
- Abu Tig (El Gouna)
- Ain Sukhna
- Quseir
- Coraya Bay
- El Gouna
- Foul Bay
- Gamsha Bay
- Gubal Strait
- Hamata
- Hurghada
- Makadi Bay
- Marsa Alam
- Tarabin town
- Port Ghalib (fr)
- Ras Banas
- Ras Gharib
- Safaga
- Sahl Hasheesh
- Serrenia
- Shoni Bay
- Soma Bay
- Wadi Gimal

Red Sea islands include:

- Abu Minqar Island
- Green Island (Egypt)
- Mukawwa Island
- Rocky Island
- Shadwan
- St. John's Island, Egypt

== See also ==
- Northern coast of Egypt
- Tourism in Egypt
- Riviera
