= HLR =

HLR may refer to:

- Hall Road railway station, in England, National Rail station code
- Heli Air Services, Bulgaria, ICAO code
- Home location register, a GSM subscriber database
- Hong Lok Road stop, Hong Kong, MTR station code
- The Human Life Review, an anti-abortion publication.
- Human Lunar Return study
- Harvard Law Review, legal publication
- Yoakum–DeFrenn Army Heliport, in Texas, US, ICO and FAA LID code
