= Geography of Egypt =

- Continent: Africa
- Region: Middle East
- Coordinates: 25.00°N 31.00°E
- Area: Ranked 30th
  - Total: 1,010,408 km^{2} (390,121 sq mi)
  - Land: 99.368%
  - Water: 0.632%
- Coastline: 2,450 km (1,520 mi)
- Borders: 2,612 km (1,623 mi) Border lengths included: Sudan (1,276 km) (793 mi); Libya (1,115 km) (693 mi); Israel (206 km) (128 mi); Gaza Strip (12 km) (7 mi); Jordan (maritime boundary, Red Sea); Saudi Arabia (maritime boundary, Red Sea); Cyprus (maritime boundary, Mediterranean Sea); Greece (maritime boundary, Mediterranean Sea); Turkey (maritime boundary, Mediterranean Sea)
- Highest point: Mount Catherine, 2,629 m
- Lowest point: Qattara Depression, -133 m
- Longest river: Nile, 6,650 km
- Largest lake: Lake Nasser, 5,250 km^{2}
- Exclusive economic zone: 263,451 km^{2} (101,719 mi^{2})

Map of Egypt

Egypt's location

The geography of Egypt relates to two regions: North Africa and West Asia.

Egypt has coastlines on the Mediterranean Sea, the River Nile, and the Red Sea. Egypt borders Libya to the west, Palestine and Israel to the east and Sudan to the south (with a current dispute over the Halaib triangle). Egypt has an area of 1,010,408 km^{2} (390,121 mi^{2}).

The longest straight-line distance in Egypt from north to south is 1,420 km (880 mi), while that from east to west measures 1,275 km (792 mi). Egypt has more than 2,900 km (1,800 mi) of coastline on the Mediterranean Sea, the Gulf of Suez, and the Gulf of Aqaba. It has an Exclusive Economic Zone of 263,451 km^{2} (101,719 mi^{2}).

== Governorates ==
Egypt is divided into 27 governorates. There are nine governorates of Lower Egypt in the Nile Delta region, ten of Upper Egypt along the Nile river south from Cairo to Aswan, and five frontier governorates covering Sinai and the deserts that lie west and east of the Nile river.

== Natural regions ==
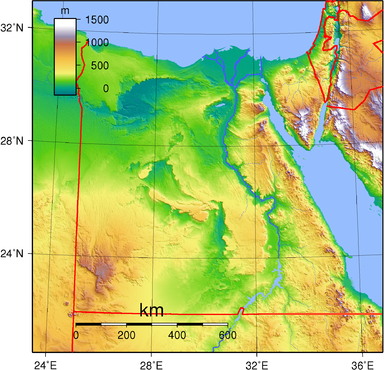
Egypt's topography

Egypt is predominantly desert. 35,000 km^{2} – 3.5% – of the total land area is cultivated and permanently settled. Most of the country lies within the wide band of desert that stretches eastwards from Africa's Atlantic Coast across the continent and into southwest Asia. Historically relevant here is The principles and objects of geology, with special reference to the geology of Egypt (1911) by W. F. Hume

Egypt's geological history has produced four major physical regions:

- Nile Valley and Nile Delta
- Western Desert (from the Nile west to the Libyan border)
- Eastern Desert (extends from the Nile Valley all the way to the Red Sea coast)
- Sinai Peninsula

Egypt is the eighth most water stressed country in the world.

Despite covering only about 5% of the total area of Egypt; the Nile Valley and Nile Delta are the most important regions, being the country's only cultivable regions and supporting about 99% of the population. The Nile valley extends approximately 800 km from Aswan to the outskirts of Cairo. The Nile Valley is known as Upper Egypt, while the Nile Delta region is known as Lower Egypt. Steep rocky cliffs rise along the banks of the Nile in some stretches, while other areas along the Nile are flat, with space for agricultural production. In the past, flooding of the Nile during the summer provided silt and water to make agriculture possible on land that is otherwise very dry. Since the construction of the Aswan Dam, agriculture in the Nile valley depends on irrigation. The Nile delta consists of flat, low-lying areas. Some parts of the delta are marshy and water-logged, and thus not suitable for agriculture. Other areas of the delta are used for agriculture.

=== Nile Valley and Delta ===
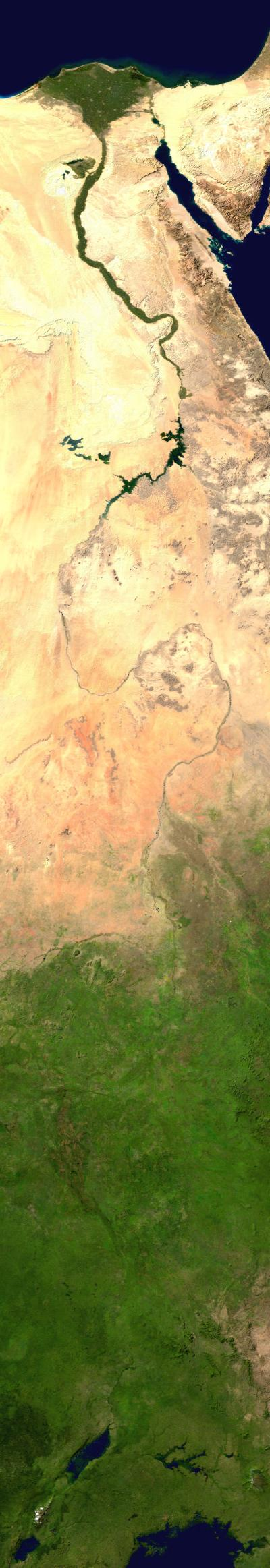
Satellite image of the Nile Delta and the entire course of the Nile River and Valley

The Nile Valley and Delta, the most extensive oasis on earth, was created by the world's longest river and its seemingly inexhaustible sources. Without the topographic channel that permits the Nile to flow across the Sahara, Egypt would be entirely desert. The length within Egypt of the River Nile in its northwards course from three central African sources – the White Nile, the Blue Nile, and the Atbara – totals some 1,600 km.

The White Nile, which begins at Lake Victoria in Uganda, supplies about 28% of the Nile's Egyptian waters. In its course from Lake Victoria to Juba in South Sudan, the White Nile's channel drops more than 600 m. In its 1,600-km course from Juba to Khartoum, Sudan's capital, the river descends just 75 m. In South Sudan, the White Nile passes through the Sudd, a wide, flat plain covered with swamp vegetation and slows almost to the point of stagnation.

The Blue Nile, which originates at Lake Tana in Ethiopia, provides on average some 58% of the Nile's Egyptian waters. This river has a steeper gradient and therefore flows more swiftly than the White Nile, which it joins at Khartoum. Unlike the White Nile, the Blue Nile carries a considerable amount of sediment. For several kilometers north of Khartoum, water closer to the eastern bank of the river, coming from the Blue Nile, is visibly muddy, while that closer to the western bank, and coming from the White Nile, is clearer.

The much shorter Atbarah River, which also originates in Ethiopia, joins the main Nile north of Khartoum between the fifth and sixth cataracts (areas of steep rapids) and provides about 14% of the Nile's waters in Egypt. During the low-water season, which runs from January to June, the Atbarah shrinks to a number of pools. But, in late summer, when torrential rains fall on the Ethiopian Highlands, the Atbarah provides 22% of the Nile's flow.

The Blue Nile has a similar pattern. It contributes 17% of the Nile's waters in the low-water season and 68% during the high-water season. In contrast, the White Nile provides only 10% of the Nile's waters during the high-water season but contributes more than 80% during the low-water period. Thus, before the Aswan High Dam was completed in 1971, the White Nile watered the Egyptian stretch of the river throughout the year, whereas the Blue Nile, carrying seasonal rain from Ethiopia, caused the Nile to overflow its banks and deposit a layer of fertile mud over adjacent fields. The great flood of the main Nile usually occurred in Egypt during August, September, and October, but it sometimes began as early as June at Aswan and often did not completely wane until January.

The Nile enters Egypt a few kilometers north of Wadi Halfa, a Sudanese town that was completely rebuilt on high ground when its original site was submerged in the reservoir created by the Aswan High Dam. As a result of the dam's construction, the Nile actually begins its flow into Egypt as Lake Nasser, which extends southwards from the dam for 320 km to the border and for an additional 158 km within Sudan. Lake Nasser's waters fill the area through Lower Nubia (Upper Egypt and northern Sudan) within the narrow canyon between the cliffs of sandstone and granite created by the flow of the river over many centuries.

Below Aswan, the cultivated floodplain strip widens to as much as twenty km. North of Isna (160 km north of Aswan), the plateau on both sides of the valley rises to as much as 550 m above sea level; at Qina (some 90 km north of Isna) the 300-m limestone cliffs force the Nile to change course towards the southwest for about 60 km before it turns northwest for about 160 km to Asyut. Northward from Asyut, the escarpments on both sides diminish, and the valley widens to a maximum of 22 km.

At Cairo, the Nile spreads out over what was once a broad estuary, subsequently filled by silt deposits to form what is now a fertile, fan-shaped delta some 250 km wide at its seaward extremity and extending about 160 km from north to south. The Nile Delta covers approximately 22,000 km^{2} (roughly equivalent in area to that of Massachusetts). According to historical accounts from the first century AD, seven branches of the Nile once ran through the delta. According to later accounts, the Nile had, by around the twelfth century, just six branches.

Since then, nature and man have closed all but two main outlets: the east branch, Damietta (also known as Dumyat; 240 km long), and the west branch, Rosetta (235 km long). Both outlets are named after the ports located at their respective mouths. A network of drainage and irrigation canals supplements these remaining outlets. In the north, near the coast, the Nile delta embraces a series of salt marshes and lakes, the most notable among which are Idku, Lake Burullus, and Lake Manzala.

The fertility and productivity of the land adjacent to the Nile depend largely on the silt deposited by floodwaters. Archaeological research indicates that people once lived at a much higher elevation along the river than they do today, probably because the river was higher or the floods more severe. The timing and amount of annual flow were always unpredictable. Measurements of annual flows as low as 1.2 billion m^{3} and as high as 4.25 billion m^{3} have been recorded. For centuries Egyptians attempted to predict and take advantage of these flows and thereby moderate the severity of floods.

The construction of dams on the Nile, particularly the Aswan High Dam, transformed the mighty river into a large and predictable irrigation ditch. Lake Nasser, the world's largest artificial lakes, has enabled planned use of the Nile regardless of the amount of rainfall in Central Africa and East Africa. The dams have also affected the Nile Valley's fertility, which was dependent for centuries not only on the water brought to the arable land but also on the materials left by the water.

Researchers have estimated that beneficial silt deposits in the valley began about 10,000 years ago. The average annual deposit of arable soil through the course of the river valley amounted to some nine metres. Analysis of the flow revealed that 10.7 million tons of solid matter passed Cairo each year.

Today, the Aswan High Dam obstructs most of this sediment, now retained in Lake Nasser. The reduction in annual silt deposits has contributed to rising water tables and increasing soil salinity in the Delta, the erosion of the river's banks in Upper Egypt, and the erosion of the alluvial fan along the shore of the Mediterranean Sea.

=== Western Desert ===
The Western Desert covers an area of some 700,000 km^{2}, thereby accounting for around two-thirds of Egypt's total land area. This immense desert to the west of the Nile spans the area from the Mediterranean Sea southwards to the Sudanese border. The desert's Jilf al Kabir Plateau, at a mean altitude of some 1000 m, constitutes an exception to the uninterrupted territory of basement rocks covered by layers of horizontally bedded sediments forming a massive plain or low plateau. The Great Sand Sea lies within the desert's plain and extends from the Siwa Oasis to Jilf al Kabir. Escarpments (ridges) and deep depressions (basins) exist in several parts of the Western Desert, and no rivers or streams drain into or out of the area.

The government has considered the Western Desert a frontier region and has divided it into two governorates at about the twenty-eighth parallel: Matruh to the north and New Valley (Al Wadi al Jadid) to the south. There are seven important depressions in the Western Desert, and all are considered oases except the largest, Qattara, the water of which is salty. The Qattara Depression, which includes the country's lowest point, encompasses 19,605 square kilometers (7,570 mi^{2}), which is similar to the size of Lake Ontario. It is largely below sea level and is 133 meters (436 ft) below sea level at the lowest. Badlands, salt marshes and salt lakes cover the sparsely inhabited Qattara Depression.

Limited agricultural production, the presence of some natural resources, and permanent settlements are found in the other six depressions, all of which have fresh water provided by the Nile or by local groundwater. The Siwah Oasis, close to the Libyan border and west of Qattara, is isolated from the rest of Egypt but has sustained life since ancient times. The Siwa's cliff-hung Temple of Amun was renowned for its oracles for more than 1,000 years. Herodotus and Alexander the Great were among the many illustrious people who visited the temple in the pre-Christian era.

The other major oases form a topographic chain of basins extending from the Faiyum Oasis (sometimes called the Fayyum Depression) which lies 60 kilometers (37 mi) southwest of Cairo, south to the Bahariya, Farafirah, and Dakhlah oases before reaching the country's largest oasis, Kharijah. A brackish lake, Birket Qarun, at the northern reaches of Al Fayyum Oasis, drained into the Nile in ancient times. For centuries sweet water artesian wells in the Fayyum Oasis have permitted extensive cultivation in an irrigated area that extends over 1,800 square kilometers (695 mi^{2}).

=== Eastern Desert ===
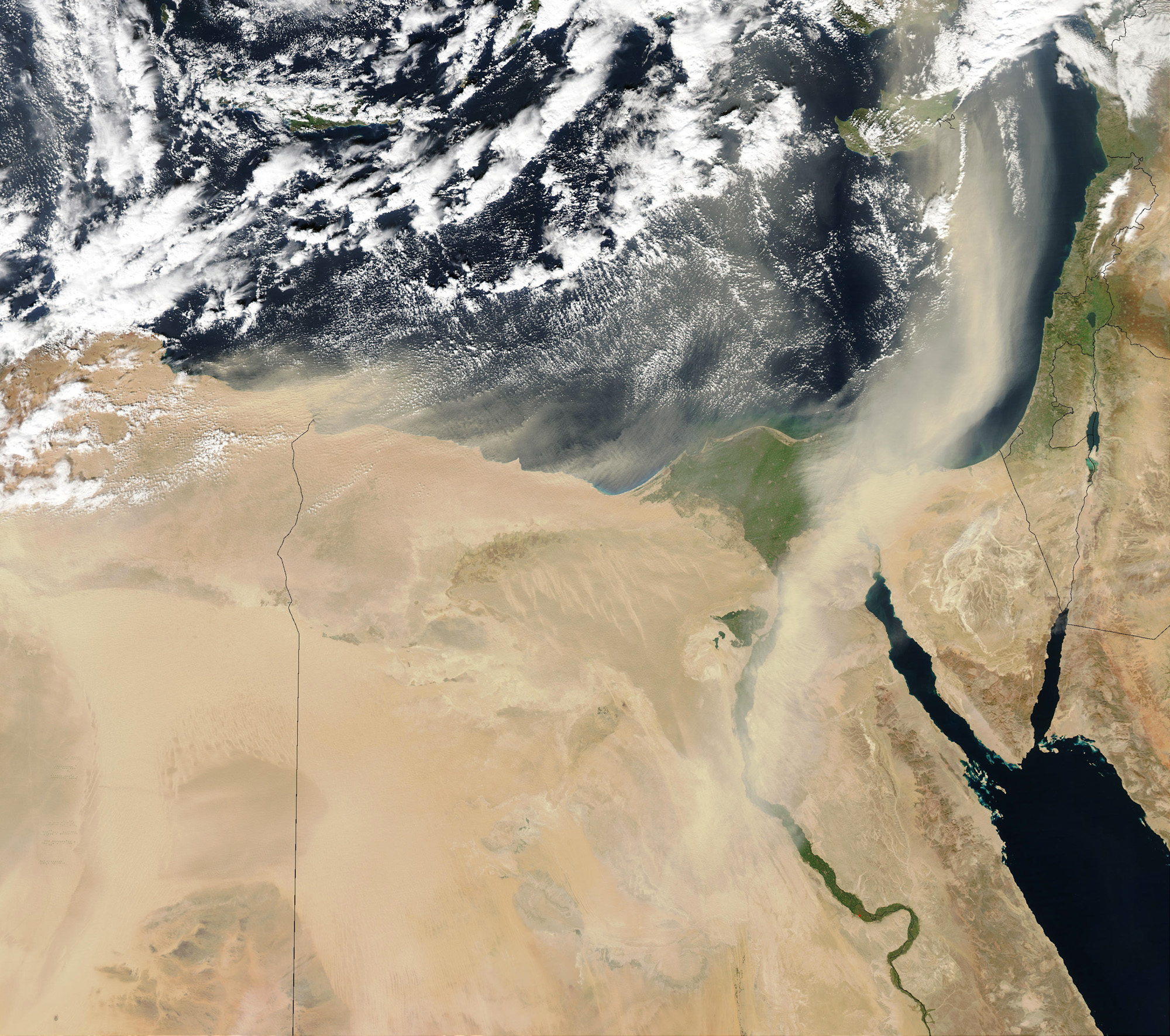
A large plume of Saharan Desert dust (light brownish pixels) blown across Libya and Egypt northward over the Mediterranean Sea toward the Middle East, on February 2, 2003.

The topographic features of the desert region east of the Nile differ from those to the west of the Nile. The Eastern Desert is relatively mountainous. The elevation rises abruptly from the Nile, and a downward-sloping plateau of sand gives way within 100 km to arid, defoliated, rocky hills running north and south between the Sudan border and the Delta. The hills reach elevations of more than 1,900 m.

The region's most prominent feature is the easterly chain of rugged mountains, the Red Sea Hills, which extend from the Nile Valley eastward to the Gulf of Suez and the Red Sea. This elevated region has a natural drainage pattern that rarely functions because of insufficient rainfall. It also has a complex of irregular, sharply cut wadis that extend westward toward the Nile. The desert environment extends all the way to the Red Sea coast.

=== Sinai Peninsula ===
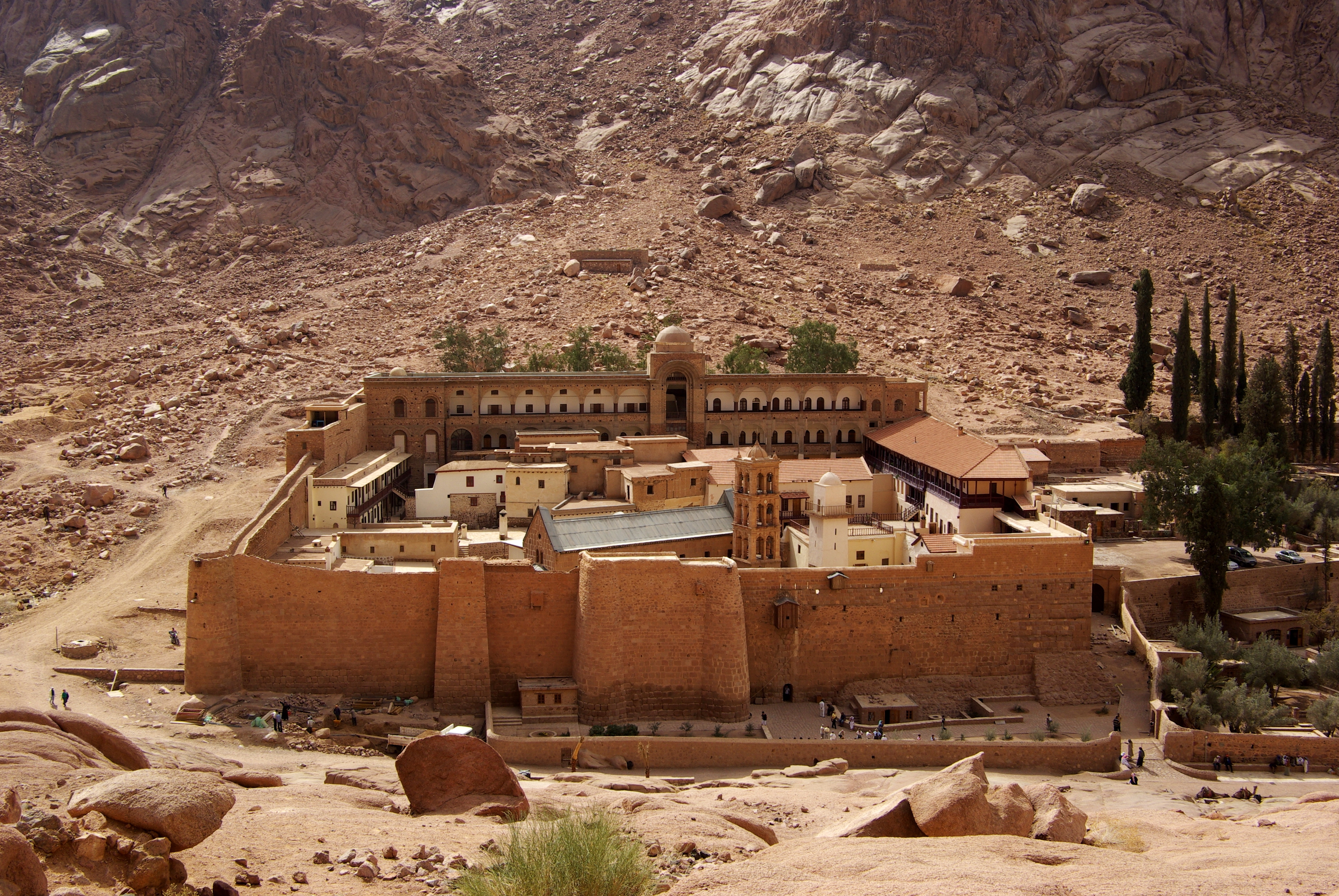
Mount Catherine in Sinai, Egypt's highest point.

The Sinai Peninsula is a triangular peninsula, about 61,100 km^{2} in area, which is slightly smaller than Latvia (64 573 km^{2}). Similar to the desert, the peninsula contains mountains in its southern sector that are a geological extension of the Red Sea Hills, the low range along the Red Sea coast that includes Mount Catherine (Gabal Katrîne), the country's highest point, at 2,642 m above sea-level. The Red Sea may have been named after these mountains, which are red.

The southern side of the peninsula has a sharp escarpment that subsides after a narrow coastal shelf that slopes into the Red Sea and the Gulf of Aqaba. The elevation of Sinai's southern rim is about 1,000 m. Moving northward, the elevation of this limestone plateau decreases. The northern third of Sinai is a flat, sandy coastal plain, which extends from the Suez Canal into the Gaza Strip and Israel.

Before the Israeli military occupied Sinai during the Six Day War (1967 Arab-Israeli War), a single Egyptian governorate administered the whole peninsula. By 1982, after all of Sinai was returned to Egypt, the central government divided the peninsula into two governorates. North Sinai has its capital at Al Arish and the South Sinai has its capital in El Tor. The Port Said (Port Fuad), Ismailia, and Suez governorates also control some sections of the eastern Sinai.

The abundance of life in the Sinai Peninsula may not be immediately apparent. This again has its roots in the way in which the animals of the desert have adapted to life here. Many species, mammals especially, but also reptiles and even birds such as owls, are nocturnal. They spend the daylight hours in the relative cool of burrows, under boulders or in crevices and cracks in the rock. Many of these creatures will only be apparent from their tracks and trails or from a fleeting glimpse of a diminutive gerbil, or a zig-zagging hare, in the car headlights at night. Even those animals that do brave the heat of the day are normally only active in the early morning or evening.

== Urban and rural areas ==
In the 1971 census, 57 percent of Egypt's population was counted as rural, including those residing in agricultural areas in the Nile Valley and Delta, as well as the much smaller number of persons living in desert areas. Rural areas differ from urban areas in terms of poverty, fertility rates, and other social factors. Agriculture is a key component of the economy in rural areas, though some people are employed in the tourism industry or other non-farm occupations. In 1992, the percentage of Egypt's population employed in agriculture was 33 percent. The agricultural industry is dependent on irrigation from the Nile River.

== Extreme points ==
This is a list of the extreme points of Egypt, the points that are farther north, south, east or west than any other location.

- Northernmost point – unnamed headland immediately north-west of Sidi Barrani, Matruh Governorate
- Easternmost point – Ras Hadarba (Cape Elba), Red Sea Governorate*
- Southernmost point – Jabal Bartazuga on the Sudanese border, Red Sea Governorate**
- Westernmost point – unnamed point on the border with Libya immediately east of the ruin of Qasr al Qarn in Libya, Matruh Governorate

\* Ras Hadarba lies within the Hala'ib triangle which is claimed by Sudan but claimed and de facto administered by Egypt. If it is excluded, then Egypt's easternmost point is the Ras Banas peninsula on the mainland or, if including islands, Mukawwa Island

\** Jabal Bartazuga lies in the Bir Tawil region, a terra nullius that is often included as part of Egypt but is not claimed by it. If this area is excluded then Egypt does not have a single southernmost point, its southern border lies along the 22nd parallel north.
