= Arsinoe, Egypt =

Arsinoe (Greek: Ἀρσινόη) was the name bestowed upon three different cities in ancient Egypt:

- Arsinoe, modern Faiyum, Middle Egypt
- Arsinoe (Gulf of Suez), also called Cleopatris, at the head of the Gulf of Suez
- Arsinoe, also called Olbia, at the mouth of the Gulf of Suez
