= Berenice pet cemetery =

Ancient animal burial site in Egypt

- Location within Egypt
- Interactive map of Berenice pet cemetery
- 23°56′45″N 35°29′18″E
- Type: Pet cemetery
- Periods: Roman Egypt
- Location: Berenike, Red Sea Governorate, Egypt
- Region: Upper Egypt

History
- Built: c. late 1st century CE
- Abandoned: c. mid 2nd century CE

Site notes
- Area: 104 m^{2} (1,120 sq ft)
- Discovered: 2011
- Condition: Ruin

The Berenice pet cemetery is a pet cemetery in Berenike, Egypt, dating from the 1st–2nd century CE. It contains the remains of more than 580 individual animals including cats, dogs, and monkeys. It is among the oldest known animal cemeteries in the world.

Unlike other animal burials in Egypt, none of the animals at Berenike were mummified. Some of the animals were buried with collars and several of the animals had evidence of injuries that would have necessitated human care for their survival.

The arrangement of the animals is purposeful, and some were intentionally placed in sleep-like positions. Many are accompanied by trinkets, wrapped in shawls, or covered with pieces of amphora.

== Background ==
Berenike was an ancient Egyptian seaport on the western shore of the Red Sea from the Hellenistic period through to late antiquity. A military post was established there by Ptolemy II in the 3rd century BCE for the transportation of African elephants for use in war. It flourished during the early Roman period and served as a port for ships from southern Arabia and India. The town was last mentioned in 523 CE, after which it was deserted and buried underneath the sand.

Egypt was one of first places where cats were domesticated. Animal burials were performed in ancient Egypt since at least the predynastic period. Cats in ancient Egypt were revered, though cat cemeteries at archaeological sites such as temple necropolises usually have mummified cats. The Berenice pet cemetery is neither the oldest nor the largest animal cemetery, being preceded by the Ashkelon dog cemetery among others.

== Archaeological history ==
Systematic archaeological excavations at Berenike began in 1994. A midden unearthed in the area sometime prior to 2001 contained the remains of an Asiatic wildcat (Felis lybica ornata).

Archaeological excavations of animal remains from the pet cemetery began in 2011. The first remains were discovered below the southern end of a Roman trash dump site in the dunes outside of the city walls northwest of Berenike. Research of the animal remains was led by Marta Osypińska, an archaeozoologist with the Institute of Archeology and Ethnology of the Polish Academy of Sciences, in cooperation with the University of Warsaw's Polish Centre of Mediterranean Archaeology.

From 2011 to 2020, archaeological research included digs in six excavation sites over a 104 m^{2} (1,120 sq ft) area. By 2017, the archaeological team reported unearthing around 100 animals from the cemetery. Archaeologists from the digs have performed "osteological, pathological, and osteometric analyses" of the remains. In 2020, a study of the pet cemetery was published in the journal World Archaeology. The study described 585 individual animals, including cats, monkeys, and dogs.

== Composition of the cemetery ==
An enclosure wall was built outside of Berenike in the mid-1st century CE. The .5 m (1 ft 8 in) wall may have had a tree, statue, or column at its center. A clay pavement surrounded the wall and animals were buried around it for about a century. Scientists dated the animal remains in the burial ground to the final quarter of the 1st century CE and the first half of the second century CE.

Unlike other animal burial sites in Egypt, at Berenike none of the animals were mummified and no humans were buried within the animal necropolis. Most of the animals were positioned carefully and intentionally in well-prepared pits. Many were shrouded in textiles or mats or covered by amphora fragments or wooden beams. Archaeozoologist Marta Osypińska likened the arrangements to a sarcophagus. Almost all of the animals found in the cemetery were buried individually, with the exception of groups of two to four cats, usually kittens.

As of 2020, archaeologists reported that 585 animals had been unearthed and identified. The pet cemetery consisted mostly of domestic cats (Felis silvestris catus), with 536 individuals. There were 32 domestic dogs and 15 Cercopithecinae monkeys, including a Rhesus macaque (Macaca mulatta) and a Bonnet macaque (Macaca radiata). A Rüppell's fox (Vulpes rueppellii) and a Barbary falcon (Falco peregrinus pelegrinoides) were also found within the cemetery.

Most of the 32 dogs found in the pet cemetery were of average size and of the spitz-type. One taller dog had an enlongated, dolichocephalic skull and a morphological resemblance to the Pharaoh Hound. Another smaller dog was a Maltese-type, analogous to the Maltese toy breeds of the era, and is the sole example of a toy dog in ancient Egypt.

By 2015, two species of monkeys were identified, a grivet (Chlorocebus aethiops) and an Olive baboon (Papio anubis). The monkeys were intentionally placed in sleeping positions, curled and on their sides. Among the monkeys, only young individuals were discovered. It was hypothesized that the monkeys died young because their primary food sources were scarce at the seaport. A Bonnet macaque buried with three kittens was accompanied by a Haliotis shell and another shell as well as a resin-sealed grass basket. Next to the macaque was a young piglet under a pottery fragment.

Several collars, mostly made from iron, were found around the necks of buried monkeys and cats. Several artifacts were recovered from the monkey burials, including amphora fragments, the skeleton of a piglet, three skeletons of kittens, and shells from the Indian Ocean. Most of the animals were buried without grave goods. Other materials were found as well, such as bronze or organics, and necklaces were discovered with beads made from shell, glass, faience and stone. Two of the young cats were found with beads made from ostrich eggshell near their necks. A curled cat was found alongside a nearly complete cattle tail.

The Berenice pet cemetery has a more varied cat population than that of the mummified animals found at Myos Hormos, where larger animals may have been selected as more suitable for mummification. One cat was placed on top of the wing of a large bird.

Aside from the nature of the burials, several of the animals from the pet cemetery show evidence of having been under human care. The bones and scales of small fish were found in the abdomens of a dog and a cat. Four of the 32 dog skeletons had pathological lesions of the skeleton, indicating the presence of osteosarcomas. One dog had advanced spondylosis, a condition which would have impaired its mobility. Another dog had periodontal disease and shoulder joints with advanced degeneration as well as a humerus bone that had an oblique or spiral fracture. Similarly, several cats had limb injuries that would have impaired their mobility, yet these injuries had healed to advanced degrees. The scientists concluded that the animals would not have been capable of finding food independently and thus were dependent on humans to care for them. None of the animals appears to have been killed intentionally, as was the case with animal mummies recovered in the Nile Valley.

Documents from Berenike during the Roman period indicate that cats were kept by its inhabitants. One ostracon from the site reads:

"Herennius to Satornilus his dearest, greetings... Concerning the cats, Ourses is taking care of them in accordance with what I also wrote you on another occasion..."

== Other discoveries at Berenike ==
Archaeological teams working at Berenike unearthed other artifacts at various dig sites. The Berenike Buddha was discovered in Berenike. Several papyri, some Roman currency, ceramics, and ostraca were discovered alongside the pet cemetery. The papyri bore the correspondence of Roman centurions.
