= Aristarchus (crater) =

Crater on the near side of Earth's Moon

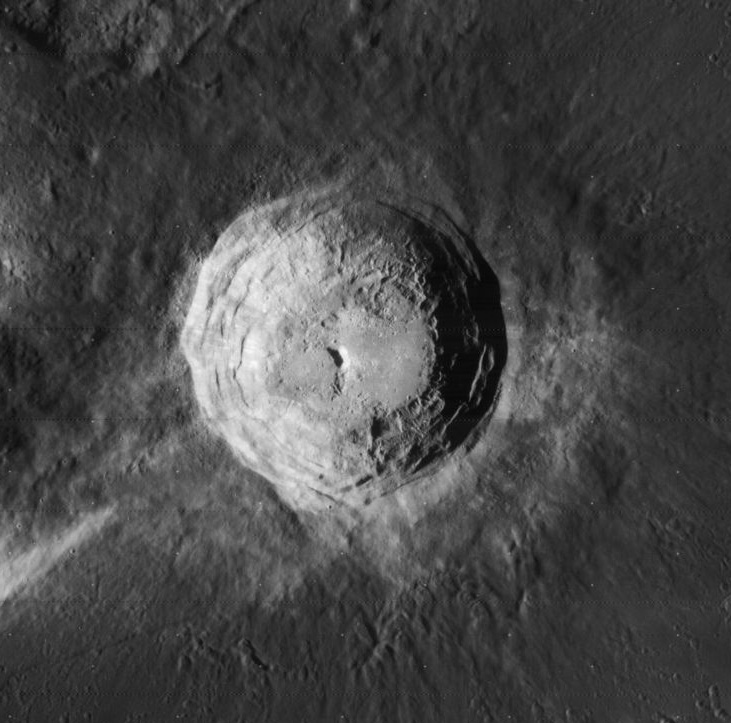
- Lunar Orbiter 4 image
- Coordinates: 23.7°N 47.4°W
- Diameter: 39.99 km (24.85 mi)
- Depth: 2.7 km (1.7 mi)
- Colongitude: 48° at sunrise
- Formation: Copernican
- Eponym: Aristarchus of Samos

Aristarchus is a lunar impact crater that lies in the northwest part of the Moon's near side. It is considered the brightest of the large formations on the lunar surface, with an albedo nearly double that of most lunar features. The feature is bright enough to be visible to the naked eye, and displays unusually bright features when viewed through a large telescope. It is also readily identified when most of the lunar surface is illuminated by earthshine. The crater is deeper than the Grand Canyon.

The crater is named after the Greek astronomer Aristarchus of Samos. It is located at the southeastern edge of the Aristarchus plateau, an elevated area that contains a number of volcanic features, such as sinuous rilles. This area is also noted for the large number of reported transient lunar phenomena, as well as recent emissions of radon gas as measured by the Lunar Prospector spacecraft.

== Description ==
Aristarchus is located on the Aristarchus plateau, an elevated rocky rise in the midst of the Oceanus Procellarum, a large expanse of lunar mare. This is a tilted crustal block, about 200 km across, that rises to a maximum elevation of 2 km above the mare in the southeastern section. Aristarchus is just to the east of the crater Herodotus and the Vallis Schröteri, and south of a system of narrow sinuous rilles named Rimae Aristarchus.

Aristarchus is bright because it is a relatively young formation, approximately 450 million years old, and the solar wind has not yet had time to darken the excavated material by the process of space weathering. The impact occurred following the creation of the ray crater Copernicus, but before the appearance of Tycho. Due to its prominent rays, Aristarchus is mapped as part of the Copernican System.

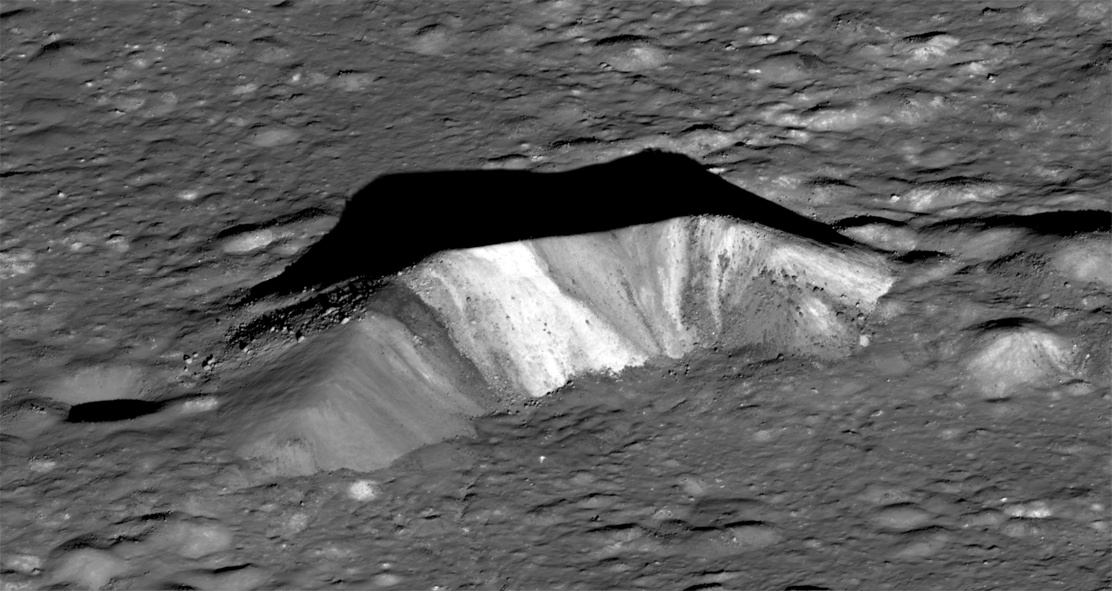
LRO image of the central peak, with colors showing variations in the composition

The brightest feature of this crater is the steep central peak (300 m tall). Sections of the interior floor appear relatively level, but orbital images reveal the surface is covered in many small hills, streaky gouges, and some minor fractures. The crater has a terraced outer wall, roughly polygonal in shape, and covered in a bright blanket of ejecta. These spread out into bright rays to the south and south-east, suggesting that Aristarchus was most likely formed by an oblique impact from the northeast, and their composition includes material from both the Aristarchus plateau and the lunar mare.

Surrounding Aristarchus are several smaller craters, many of which are probably secondary craters. Secondary craters form when large blocks ejected from the primary crater reimpact the surface at high velocities.

== Observation and exploration ==
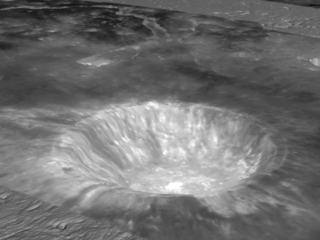
Clementine image of Aristarchus and surroundings mapped onto simulated topography

In 1911, Professor Robert W. Wood used ultraviolet photography to take images of the crater area. He discovered the plateau had an anomalous appearance in the ultraviolet, and an area to the north appeared to give indications of a sulfur deposit. This colorful area is sometimes referred to as "Wood's Spot", an alternative name for the Aristarchus plateau.

Spectra taken of this crater during the Clementine mission were used to perform mineral mapping. The data indicated that the central peak is a type of rock called anorthosite, which is a slow-cooling form of igneous rock composed of plagioclase feldspar. By contrast the outer wall is troctolite, a rock composed of equal parts plagioclase and olivine.

The Aristarchus region was part of a Hubble Space Telescope study in 2005 that was investigating the presence of oxygen-rich glassy soils in the form of the mineral ilmenite. Baseline measurements were made of the Apollo 15 and Apollo 17 landing sites, where the chemistry is known, and these were compared to Aristarchus. The Hubble Advanced Camera for Surveys was used to photograph the crater in visual and ultraviolet light. The crater was determined to have especially rich concentrations of ilmenite, a titanium oxide mineral that could potentially be used in the future by a lunar settlement for extracting oxygen.

Measurements of the lunar surface by the Gamma-ray spectrometer on the Lunar Prospector spacecraft identified found several regions with anomalously high abundances of heat-producing thorium. One of these was located near the Aristarchus crater. Both the mantle and crust in the Aristarchus region appear thorium rich, and it has likely seen multiple episodes of thorium-rich igneous activity.

In November 2011, the Lunar Reconnaissance Orbiter passed over the crater, which spans almost 25 miles (40 kilometers) and sinks more than 2 miles (3.5 kilometers) deep. "The Aristarchus plateau is one of the most geologically diverse places on the moon: a mysterious raised flat plateau, a giant rille carved by enormous outpourings of lava, fields of explosive volcanic ash, and all surrounded by massive flood basalts," said Mark Robinson, principal investigator of the Lunar Reconnaissance Orbiter Camera at Arizona State University.

== Transient lunar phenomena ==
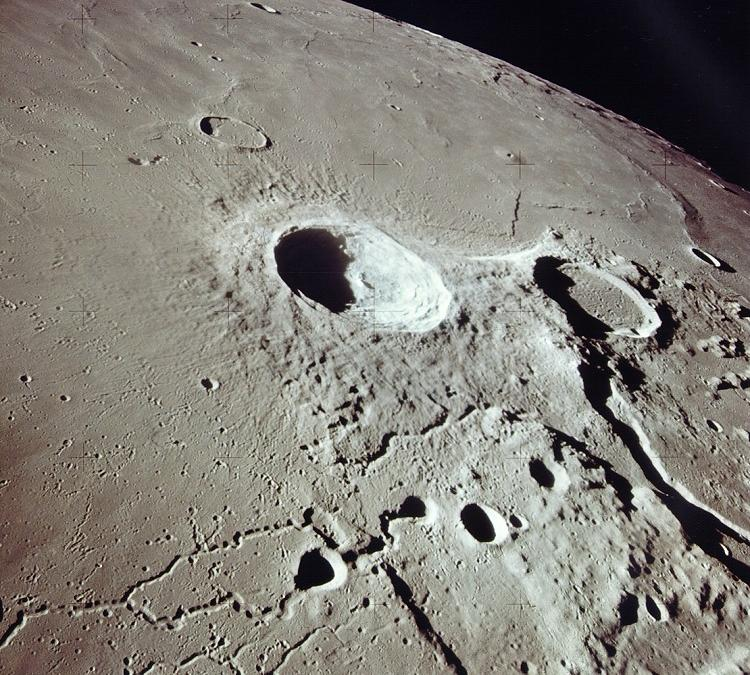
Aristarchus (center) and Herodotus (right) from Apollo 15

The region of the Aristarchus plateau has been the site of many reported transient lunar phenomena, with a total of 122 such reports by 2007; the highest recorded for any lunar feature. Such events include temporary obscurations and colorations of the surface, and catalogues of these show that more than one-third of the most reliable spottings come from this locale. In 1971 when Apollo 15 passed 110 kilometers above the Aristarchus plateau, a significant rise in alpha particles was detected. These particles are believed to be caused by the decay of radon-222, a radioactive gas with a half-life of only 3.8 days. The Lunar Prospector mission later confirmed radon-222 emissions from this crater. These observations may be explained by either the slow and visually imperceptible diffusion of gas to the surface, or by discrete explosive events.

One of the oldest reports of transient lunar phenomena in Aristarchus is an observation made by German astronomer Heinrich Wilhelm Matthias Olbers on 5 February 1821. Contemporary Henry Kater publicly believed that this and other events were due to volcanic activity on the Moon, a belief not so confidently shared by Olbers, who believed it explainable in a manner "more consistent with what we know of the physical construction of the moon [sic]."

== Names ==
Aristarchus is named after the Greek astronomer Aristarchus of Samos (310-230 B.C. ?). Like many of the craters on the Moon's near side, it was given its name by Italian astronomer Giovanni Riccioli, whose 1651 nomenclature system became standardized in 1935 by was adopted by the International Astronomical Union in 1935. Earlier lunar cartographers had given the feature different names. Michael van Langren's 1645 map calls it "Balthasaris Hispa. Pri." after Balthazar Charles, then the heir apparent to the kingdoms of Spain. Johannes Hevelius called it "Mons Porphyrites" after the mountains near Olbia, Egypt. A particular region of very low ultraviolet albedo is called Wood's Spot after its discoverer, Robert W. Wood.

== Satellite craters ==
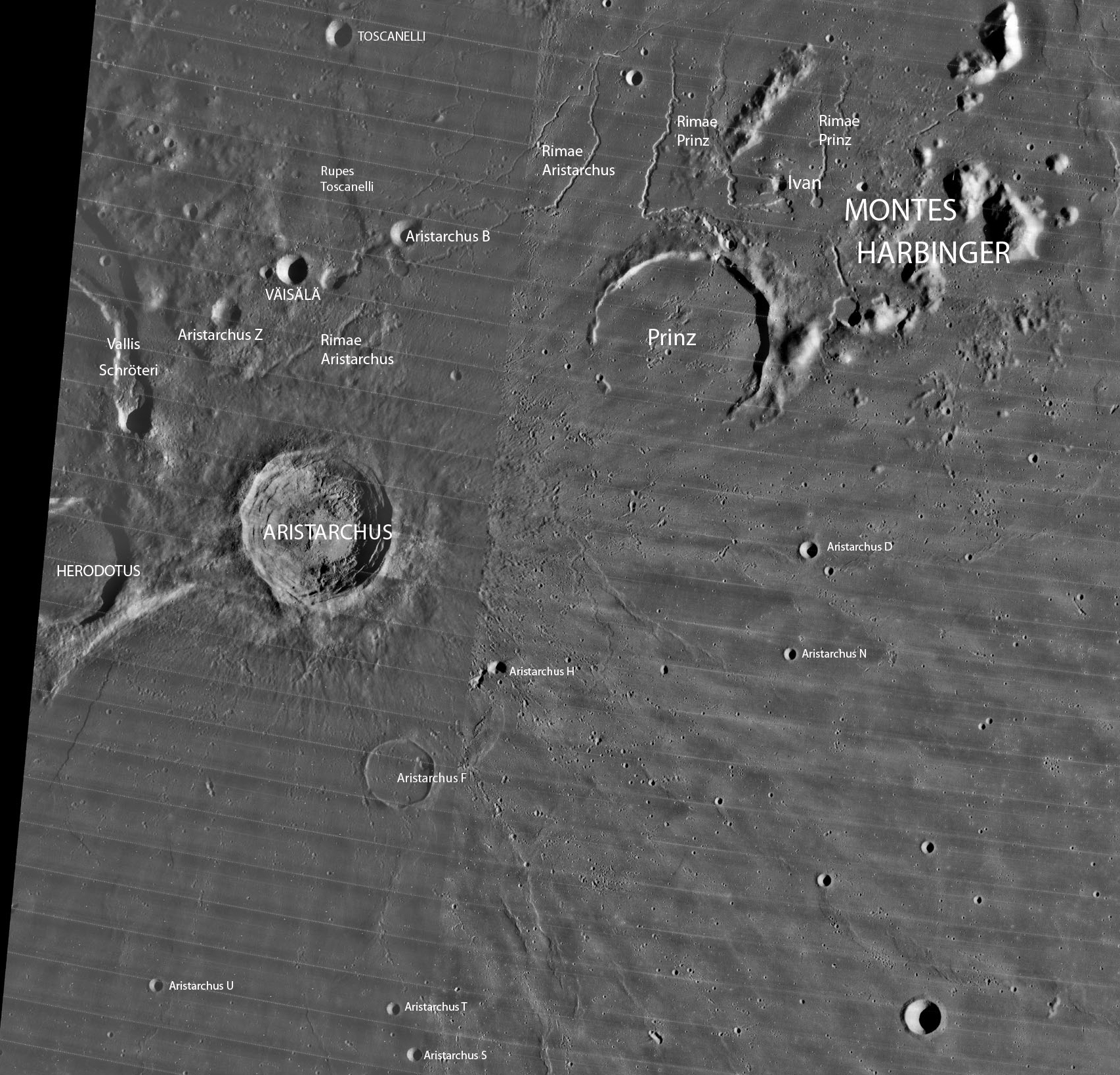
Aristarchus and its satellite craters

By convention these features are identified on lunar maps by placing a letter on the side of the crater midpoint that is closest to the primary crater.

Aristarchus	Latitude	Longitude	Diameter
B	26.3° N	46.8° W	7 km
D	23.7° N	42.9° W	5 km
F	21.7° N	46.5° W	18 km
H	22.6° N	45.7° W	4 km
N	22.8° N	42.9° W	3 km
S	19.3° N	46.2° W	4 km
T	19.6° N	46.4° W	4 km
U	19.7° N	48.6° W	4 km
Z	25.5° N	48.4° W	8 km

The following craters have been renamed by the IAU.

- Aristarchus A — See Väisälä.
- Aristarchus C — See Toscanelli.

== Gallery ==
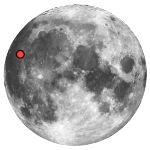
Location of the Aristarchus crater on the Moon

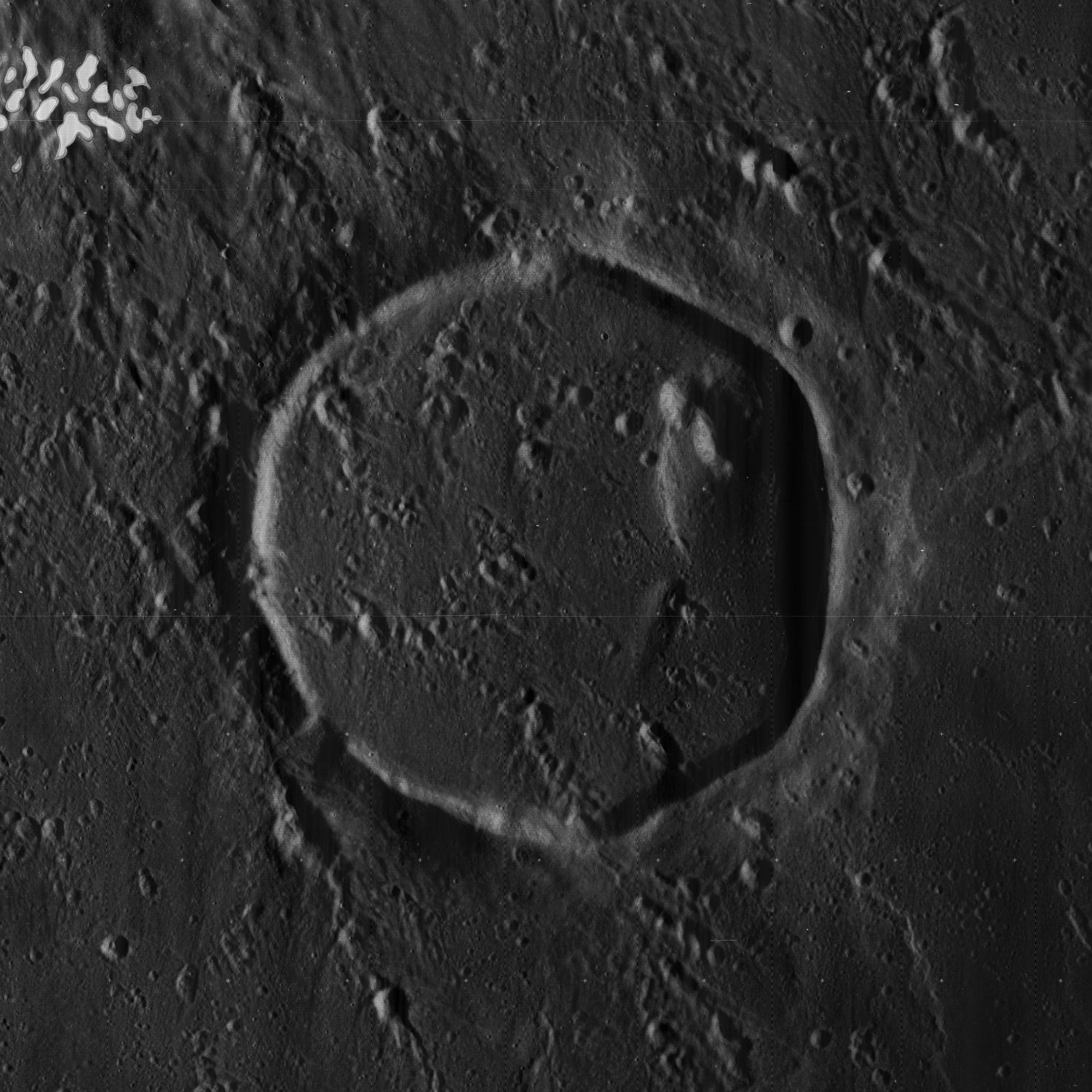
Aristarchus F (Lunar Orbiter 5 image)

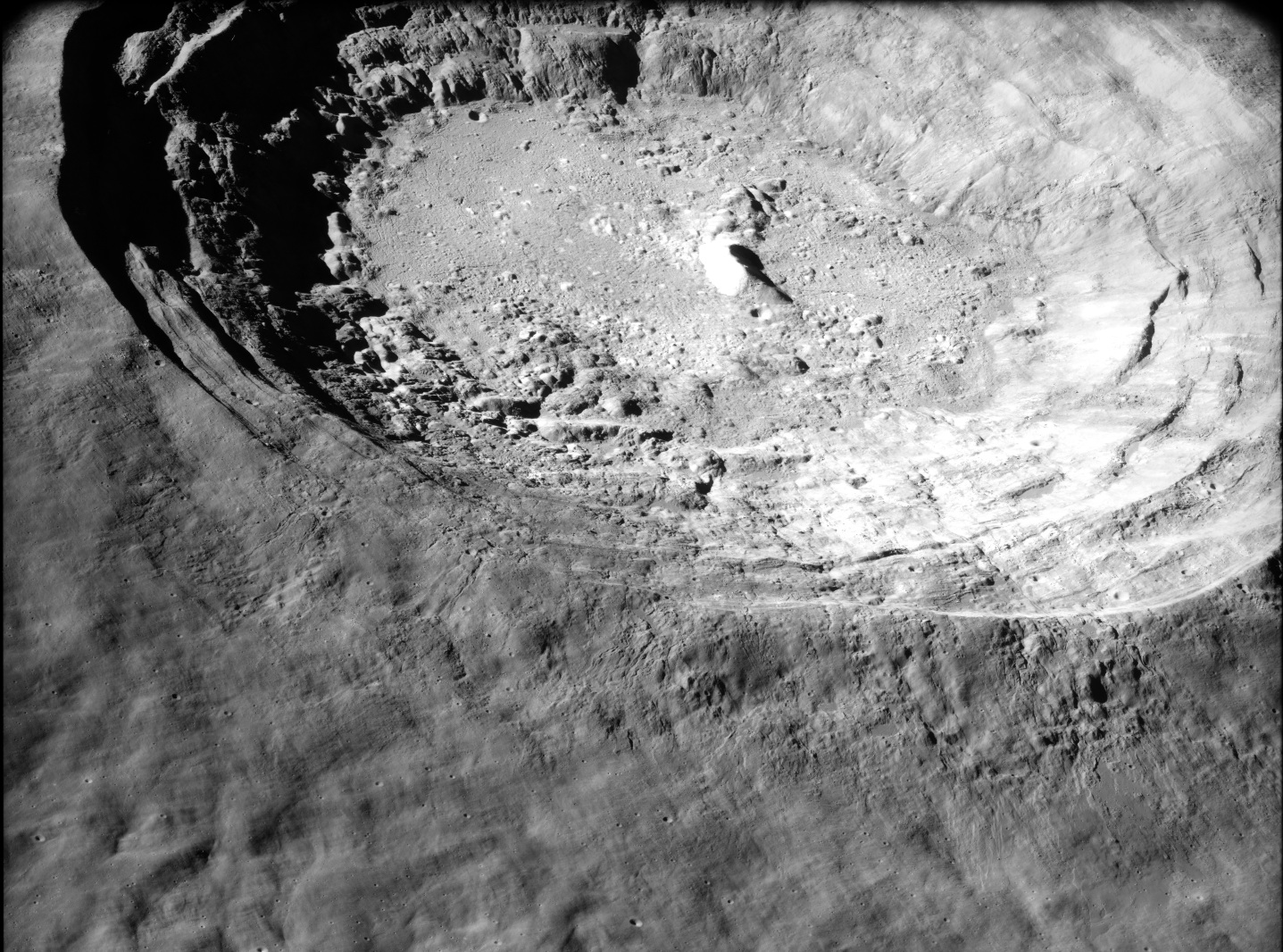
Oblique closeup from Apollo 15. NASA photo

== See also ==
- Apollo 18
- Human Lunar Return study
