= James McFadden (disambiguation) =

James McFadden (born 1983) is a Scottish football player.

James McFadden may also refer to:

- Jim McFadden (1920–2002), Irish pro hockey player
- J. P. McFadden (1930–1998), founder of the Human Life Review
- James A. McFadden (1880–1952), American Catholic bishop
