= Foul Bay =

Bay in Egypt

- خليج برنيس (Arabic)
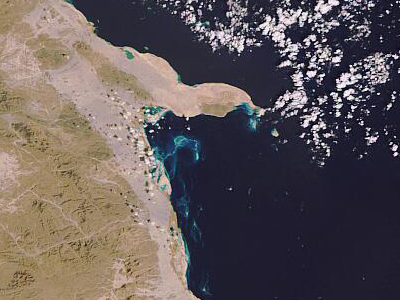
- Satellite view of Foul Bay

- Location in Egypt
- Coordinates: 23°41′N 35°37′E
- Ocean/sea sources: Red Sea
- Basin countries: Egypt
- Max. length: 30 km (19 mi)
- Max. width: 28 km (17 mi)
- Islands: Mukawwa Island, St. John's Island
- Settlements: Berenice

Foul Bay (Greek: Akathartos Kolpos, "uncleaned bay"; Latin: Sinus Immundus, Arabic: خليج برنيس, romanized: khalij Baranis, lit. 'Berenice Bay') is a bay on the Egyptian side of the Red Sea, in the Red Sea Governorate.

== Geography ==
Foul Bay is located slightly north of the Tropic of Cancer. The town which lies at the most inland section of the bay is Berenice (Arabic: برنيس, Barnīs). The northern part of Foul Bay is a peninsula called Ras Banas.

The ancient ruins of Berenice Troglodytica are located on the bay.

=== Islands ===
Foul Bay has many islands that were formed by an upthrust of rock near the mantle during the convergence of two continental plates under the Red Sea. Some of the most noteworthy are:

- Mukawwa Island
- Rocky Island
- St. John's Island

== Recreation ==
Foul Bay is popular among tourists for its diving opportunities. Strong and dangerous currents limit only experienced divers to some places where they can observe corals.
