= Rimae Aristarchus =

Series of rilles on the Moon

The Rimea Aristarchus is a system of narrow sinuous rilles to the north of the Aristarchus crater. They extend for a distance of 121 km, making them amongst the largest rilles on the moon.
