= Toscanelli (crater) =

Crater on the Moon

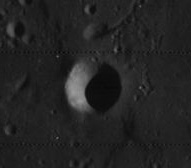
- Lunar Orbiter 4 image
- Coordinates: 27.9°N 47.5°W
- Diameter: 7 km
- Depth: Unknown
- Colongitude: 48° at sunrise
- Eponym: Paolo Toscanelli

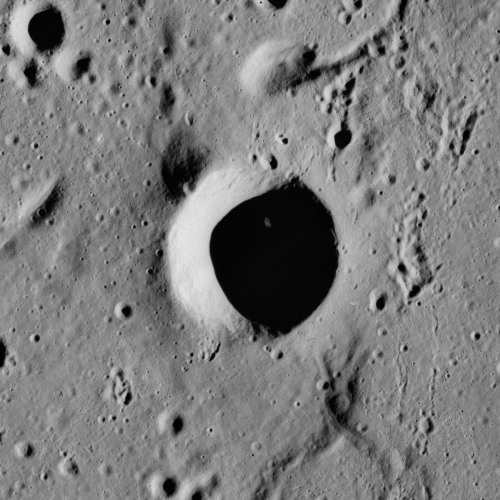
Apollo 15 image

Toscanelli is a tiny, bowl-shaped lunar impact crater that is located to the north of the prominent crater Aristarchus, in the northwestern part of the Moon. The crater lies at the southern end of a rille that proceeds towards the north. This rille is part of a nearby system that has the designation Rimae Aristarchus. Just to the south of Toscanelli is a fault line in the surface named the Rupes Toscanelli, after the crater. This break in the surface continues to the south for a distance of about 70 kilometers.

Previously identified as Aristarchus C, this crater was named after Italian mathematician, astronomer, and cosmographer Paolo Toscanelli (1397–1482).
