= Mukawwa Island =

Island in Egypt

Coordinates: 23°50′06″N 35°48′31″E

Native name: جزيرة مكوع
- Interactive map of Mukawwa Island

Geography
- Location: Red Sea
- Total islands: 1

Administration
- Egypt

Demographics
- Population: Uninhabited

Mukawwa Island (Arabic: جزيرة مكوع) is a small shore island of the Red Sea, at the northern entrance to Foul Bay in the Red Sea Governorate of Egypt.

It is one of a small group of islands which in Foul Bay, including Rocky Island and St. John's Island.

It is believed that it was once part of mainland Egypt and connected through Râs Banas, that however became separated either through erosion or rising sea levels.
