= J. P. McFadden =

American activist (1930–1998)

James Patrick McFadden (1930–1998) was an American journalist and publisher who founded the Ad Hoc Committee in Defense of Life in 1973 as a reaction to the Roe v. Wade decision by the United States Supreme Court. He also founded the Human Life Foundation, and in 1974 he launched its publication, the Human Life Review, a quarterly journal of scholarship opposed to abortion. He also founded the National Committee of Catholic Laymen in 1977.

== Background ==
He was a native of Youngstown, Ohio. He graduated from Youngstown College in 1953 and served in the Army from 1954 to 1956. He began his journalism career with the Youngstown Vindicator. In 1956 he began working for National Review magazine, after reading about the magazine's founding while stationed in Germany as a military intelligence aide. He was on the National Review's staff for more than 25 years, including 12 years as associate publisher.

== Death ==
McFadden died of an esophageal hemorrhage on October 17, 1998, following a five-year struggle with cancer.
