= Heli Air Services =

Charter airline of Bulgaria

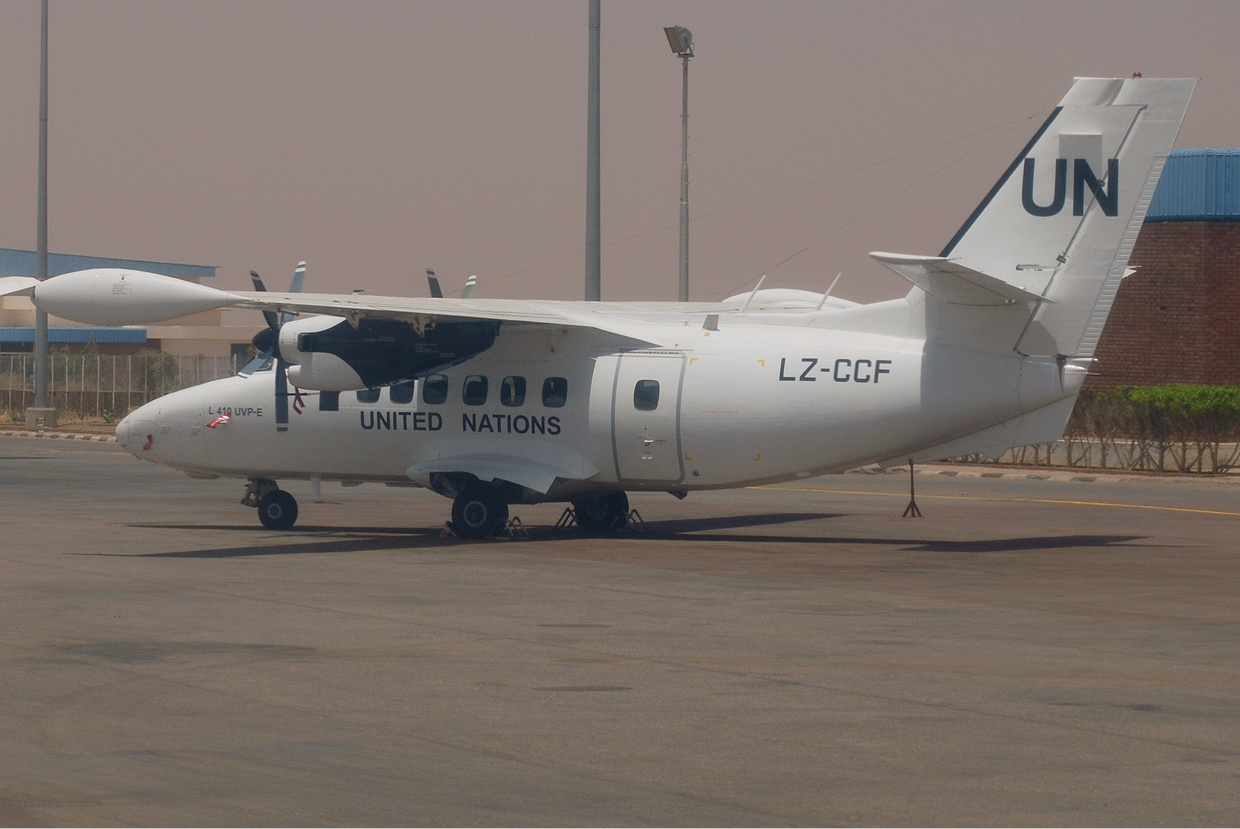
- L410 UVP-E20 in UNO colors
IATA	ICAO	Call sign
-	HLR	HELI BULGARIA
- Founded: 1990; 36 years ago
- Hubs: Vasil Levski Sofia Airport
- Destinations: charters
- Headquarters: Sofia, Bulgaria
- Key people: Zahari Alexiev (CEO)
- Website: heliair.bg

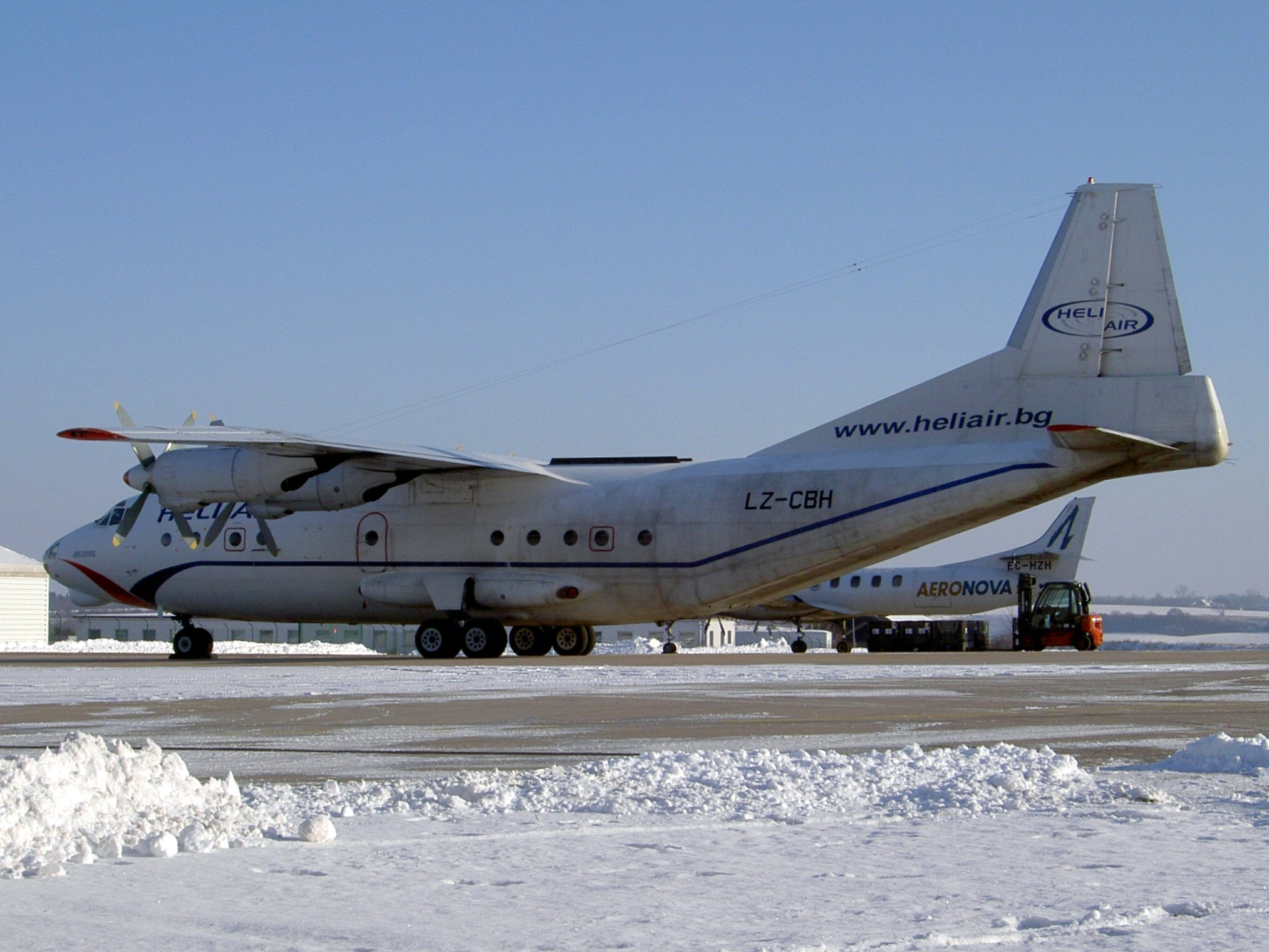
Antonov An-12s were mainly operated in 90s

Heli Air Services is a charter airline based in Sofia, Bulgaria.

== History ==
The airline was founded in 1990. The airline mainly transports passengers, cargo and mail. At first, Heli Air only operated helicopters and subsequently incorporated the Antonov An-12, Antonov An-24, Cessna and Let L-410 into its fleet. Since 1999, Heli Air started to operate primarily on programs of United Nations and World Food Programme (UN - WFP), and performed thousands of flying hours in difficult accessible locations and troubled countries such as Angola, Guinea, Mozambique, Ivory Coast, Sierra Leone, Sudan, Afghanistan and others.

== Fleet ==
The Heli Air fleet includes the following aircraft:

- 2 L410 UVP-E20
- 2 Cessna 560XL
