= The Human Life Review =

- Editor: Maria McFadden
- Former editors: J. P. McFadden
- Categories: Cultural journal
- Frequency: Quarterly
- Publisher: The Human Life Foundation
- First issue: 1975
- Country: United States
- Based in: New York City
- Language: English
- Website: http://www.humanlifereview.com
- ISSN: 0097-9783

The Human Life Review is a quarterly journal published by the Human Life Foundation since 1975. It is devoted to explorations of life issues, primarily abortion, as well as neonaticide, medical genetics, prenatal testing, human cloning, fetal tissue experimentation, euthanasia and assisted suicide, and also publishes articles dealing with more general questions of family and society. It was founded by James Patrick McFadden, formerly associate publisher of National Review, who had also founded the Human Life Foundation, and is now edited by his daughter, Maria McFadden. It was launched from the offices of National Review, with the support of William F. Buckley.

Writers whose work has been featured in The Human Life Review include Nat Hentoff, Hadley Arkes, William McGurn, Thomas Sowell, Wesley Smith, David Quinn, Kathryn Jean Lopez and President Ronald Reagan.
