= Human Lunar Return study =

Proposed experimental technology demonstrations for a manned Moon landing in 2001

NASA began its "Human Lunar Return study" in September 1995 to identify ways it could conduct future human spaceflight missions to the Moon. The final Human Lunar Return (HLR) briefing took place on August 7, 1996. The study was seen as laying "the foundation for human space activity over the next three decades."

== Mission ==
The study called for a mission lasting 16 days, 10 of which would be spent on the lunar surface. The study baselined a lightweight architecture including an open-cockpit lunar lander weighing 4,565 kilograms (10,064 lb) including fuel. The lunar habitat was designed to have an inflatable hull and was scheduled to be delivered in advance of the crew. To protect against cosmic rays and a possible solar particle event, the hull of the lunar habitat to be at minimum 5 grams per square centimetre (1.1 oz/in^{2}) thick and filled with either water or polyethylene. Components and crew for the mission would have been transported to the International Space Station (ISS) by two Space Shuttle flights. The HLR schedule called for the first mission to depart from the ISS in August 2001. One of the primary goals of the mission was to bring 300 kilograms (660 lb) of payload from the lunar surface back to Earth to be studied.

== Cost ==
The projected cost of the mission over the five year development timeline ranged between $2.5 and $4 billion. The mission required two shuttle and three Proton launches to land two astronauts and a small habitat structure at Aristarchus crater.

== See also ==
- Vision for Space Exploration
- Mars to Stay
