= Olbia (Egypt) =

Olbia or Arsinoe (Greek: Ἀρσινόη) was an ancient city in the Regio Troglodytica upon the western coast of the Red Sea between Philoteras (Quseir or Kosseir) and Myos Hormos. (Strabo xvi. p. 769; Steph. B. s. v. Ἀρσινόη). The city was renamed from Olbia to Arsinoe by Ptolemy II in honor of Arsinoe II of Egypt, who was both his sister and wife. According to Agatharchides (de Rub. Mar. p. 53), there were hot springs in its neighborhood. The city stood nearly at the point where the limestone range of the Arabian hills joins the Mons Porphyrites, and at the southern entrance of the Gulf of Suez (the Heroopolite Gulf).
