= Myos Hormos =

Ancient port on the Red Sea in southeastern Egypt

- Location within Egypt
- 26°9′24″N 34°14′30″E
- Type: Settlement
- Periods: Ptolemaic Kingdom to Roman Empire
- Location: Al-Qusayr, Red Sea Governorate, Egypt
- Region: Upper Egypt

History
- Built: 3rd century BC
- Built by: Ptolemaic dynasty
- Abandoned: After the 4th century AD

Myos Hormos (Ancient Greek: Μυὸς Ὅρμος), later also Aphrodites Hormos (Ἀφροδίτης ὅρμος), was a significant ancient port in Egypt, situated on the Red Sea, and was active during the Ptolemaic and Roman periods.

The settlement is believed to have been founded during the Ptolemaic period, possibly under Ptolemy II Philadelphus (283–246 BC), Excavations carried out recently by David Peacock and Lucy Blue of the University of Southampton, identified it with the present-day site of Quseir al-Quadim (old Quseir), eight kilometres north of the modern town of El Qoseir in Egypt. Excavations at the site revealed that the port thrived most during the 1st century AD, but declined by the 3rd century AD.

== Etymology ==
T A a w xAst
ṯꜣꜥw
in hieroglyphs
Era: Middle Kingdom
(2055–1650 BC)

The Myos Hormos may mean the "Harbour of the Mouse", but most probably meant the "Harbour of the Mussel" (μύειν, to close, e.g. the shell), since on the neighbouring coast the pearl mussel was collected in large quantities.

sbA sbA sbA niwt niwt
dwꜣw
in hieroglyphs
Era: Ptolemaic dynasty
(305–30 BC)

The port was later renamed Aphrodites Hormos (Ancient Greek: Ἀφροδίτης ὅρμος), though the original name remained more widely used. It seems to have obtained the name of Aphrodite (technically meaning foam of the sea), from the abundance of sea-sponge found in its bay.

== History ==
Ptolemy II Philadelphus selected it for the principal harbour of the trade with India, in preference to Arsinoe, since Arsinoe was at the head of the Red Sea and there was a tedious and difficult navigation down the Heroopolite Gulf. Vessels from Myos Hormos traded with Africa, Arabia, and India.

After the Ptolemies, it was with Berenice (further south on the Red Sea coast) one of the two main ports in Roman Egypt for trade with India, Africa and probably China.

Some of its main destinations were the Indus delta, Muziris and the Kathiawar peninsula in India. The coastal trade from Myos Hormos and Berenice along the coast of the Indian Ocean is described in the anonymous 1st century AD handbook Periplus of the Erythraean Sea.

first comes Egypt's port of Myos Hormos, and beyond it, after a sail of 1800 stades to the right, Berenice. The ports of both are bays on the Red Sea on the edge of Egypt.

It was one of the main trading centers on the Red Sea.

According to Strabo (II.5.12), by the time of Augustus, up to 120 ships were setting sail every year from Myos Hormos to India:

At any rate, when Gallus was prefect of Egypt, I accompanied him and ascended the Nile as far as Syene and the frontiers of Ethiopia, and I learned that as many as one hundred and twenty vessels were sailing from Myos Hormos to India, whereas formerly, under the Ptolemies, only a very few ventured to undertake the voyage and to carry on traffic in Indian merchandise.

— Strabo II.5.12.

The port of Myos Hormos was connected to the Nile valley and Memphis by a Roman road, built in the 1st century.

Myos Hormos was a diverse, multi-ethnic community, as evidenced by the various languages spoken and the presence of foreign residents. The analysis of inscriptions, including two Tamil inscriptions dated to the first century AD, indicates commercial connections with South India, particularly the region of Arikamedu. In addition to Tamil, other languages such as Greek, Latin, South Arabian, Nabataic, and Palmyrene have been attested. There is textual evidence of a small military presence in the town; a garrison of 50-100 soldiers was stationed there from the first century CE into the early second century, though no direct archaeological evidence of a military structure has been found.

The trade route from Rome to India, showing Myos Hormos

== Abandonment ==
The decline and eventual abandonment of Myos Hormos remains a subject of scholarly debate. Many scholars attribute its demise to the Crisis of the Third Century, which affected the Roman Empire politically, economically, and militarily.

A 2020 study suggests that the port's decline began earlier, in the 2nd century AD. Archaeological evidence shows that by the mid-2nd century, the harbor and settlement had already fallen into disuse. The site's abandonment may have been driven by the rise of northern ports like Clysma, which became more accessible and efficient with the opening of Trajan's Canal around 112 AD. These developments made the northern ports more favorable for Roman traders.

Only in the 17th century the port started to regain some importance, mainly because of holy travel from Cairo to Mecca. Myos Hormos is now the city of old Qusair.

== See also ==
- El Qoseir
- Berenice Troglodytica
- Indo-Roman trade relations

== Bibliography ==
- G.W.B. Huntingford. The Ethnology and History of the Area Covered by the Periplus in Huntingford ed., "Periplus of the Erythraean Sea" (London, 1980).
