= Zabargad Island =

Island in Foul Bay, Egypt

Coordinates: 23°36′35″N 36°11′45″E

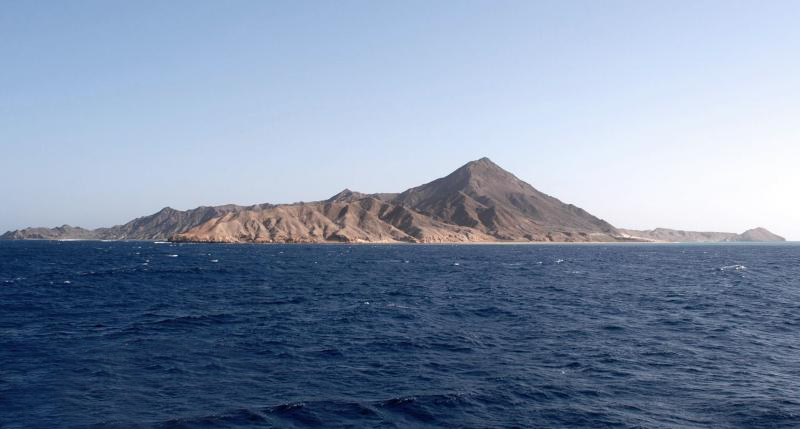
Zabargad Island, Egypt.

Zabargad Island (Egyptian Arabic: جزيرة الزبرجد Geziret El Zabargad, also known as St. John's Island in English, identified as Topazos during Antiquity, in Ancient Greek Topazos = Τόπαζος, in Latin Topazos), is the largest of a group of islands in Foul Bay, Egypt, in the Red Sea. It covers an area of 4.50 square kilometres (1.74 square miles). It is not a Quaternary volcanic island, but rather is believed to be an upthrust part of upper mantle material. The nearest island is known as "Rocky Island". The island is slightly north of the Tropic of Cancer, and its highest point is 235 metres (771 feet).

== History ==
Before the mid 270s [BCE] Ptolemaic activity along the African coast of the Red Sea had been limited with few significant results other than the discovery of the 'topaz' deposits on the island of Gazirat Zabarjad southeast of Ras Banas. ... 2. Pliny, HN 37, 108 refers to a large topaz that was brought back to Egypt as a gift for Ptolemy I's queen Berenice I.

== Geology ==
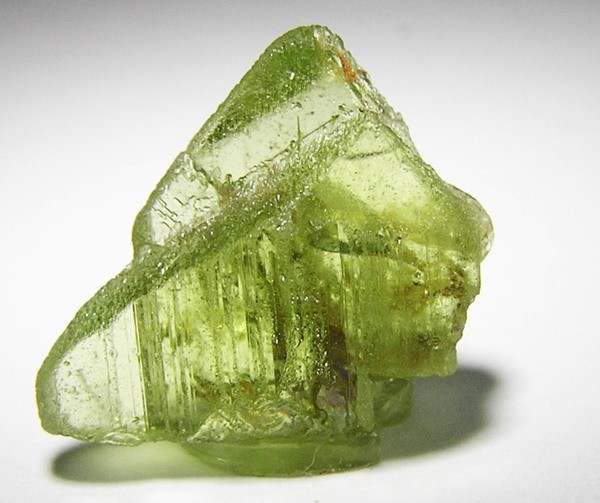
Historic specimen of forsterite var. peridot, 1.3 cm × 0.7 cm × 0.4 cm (0.5 in × 0.3 in × 0.2 in). Mining of peridot seems to have begun around 300 BC.

The island is considered geologically unique as it is uplifted mantle, a fragment of the sub-Red Sea lithosphere. Rocks on the island are mainly lower crustal igneous rocks. The island became present above sea level after African and Asiatic continental plates converged to cause rocks in the lower crust to be uplifted. The island contains three masses of peridotite, which are rich in the gemstone peridot (olivine). The island is believed to be the first discovered source of peridot, which was called topazios in ancient times, hence the Greek name for the island, Topazos = Τόπαζος (in Latin Topazos). Layers of spinel-lherzolites with anhydrous Al-diopside pyroxenites and hydrous Cr-diopside pyroxenites can be found on the island.

Pliny, XXXV, chap. 22 says that, according to Juba, the island "Topazus in the Red Sea", also had mines producing sandarach (realgar) and ochre, "but neither of them are imported to us from that place."

== Nature ==
The island is part of the Elba National Park meaning the island is conserved. However, the island was closed to the public for one year due to damage to corals and the disturbance of birds who breed on the island.

=== Birds ===
The island serves as a breeding ground for at least nine known species of birds. The most recent discovery was that of 150 pairs of sooty falcon (Falco concolor) in October, 1994.

=== Plantlife ===
There is very little vegetation on the island due to the lack of soil.

=== Corals and sealife ===
The corals surround the island and act as a barrier for the fish and other sea life which live among it. However, the corals recently became damaged due to increased tourist activity and the expansion of the diving industry on the island. The coral is located approximately 25 metres below the surface.

Fish that can be found within the nearby waters and corals are:

- Rays
- Moray eels
- Octopus
- Crocodilefish
- Cuttlefish

== Tourism ==
The island is near coral reefs, which are a popular diving attraction for tourists. The diving industry on the island has increased as well as the tourism industry on the island in general resulting in construction of hotels and diving shelves. The beaches are often quiet and are relatively unspoilt by development. However, most tourists go to this island as a "stop-off" before going to Rocky Island in the south.
