= Ras Banas =

Peninsula in Egypt

Coordinates: 23°54′17″N 35°47′20″E

Red Sea map showing Ras Banas

Ras Banas (Greek: Lepte Akra, Egyptian Arabic: راس بناس pronounced [ɾɑːs bæˈnæːs]) is a peninsula in Egypt extending into the Red Sea. The inlet of water sheltered to the south of it is called Foul Bay, at the head of which sits the ancient port of Berenice. It is believed that Mukawwa Island to the south of the tip of the peninsula, may have been connected to the peninsula at some point in the past however little or no research has been conducted to support this claim.

== History ==
=== Ancient ===
During the ancient period it was known as Lepte Akra (Λεπτὴ ἄκρα).

=== Modern ===
Ras Banas has a detailed military history.

What was then only a small military airport is used to fold the Egyptian air force base housing a part of the 9th light bomber squadron equipped with Ilyushin Il-28 is bombarded by four Sud Aviation Vautour of Israeli air force during the Six Day War on 5 June 1967. The 29 Egyptian Il-28 are destroyed in this conflict except the only two in air combat.

It served as a Soviet military base until they moved out. The Soviets were allowed to construct the base following the 1964 USSR-United Arab Republic (Egypt) fishing agreement. The Soviets commenced the construction of the base in 1970, becoming their first base in Egypt, although the construction of the base was kept secret until 1972 when an Israeli newspaper published details of the base. The Egyptian government continued to try to cover up the base by alleging that a new port was being constructed at Berenice with a road being constructed from there to Aswan, although through treacherously difficult terrain. This new road would allow produce from the area to travel to Aswan and also allow for pilgrims to travel from Egypt to Saudi Arabia. These claims by the Egyptian government were later proven incorrect following international investigation. In July 1972, Egyptian President Anwar Sadat, seeking to establish good relations with the United States, ordered the Soviets to leave.

In February 1979, Anwar El Sadat encouraged Harold Brown, the United States Secretary of Defense of the time, to consider using the peninsula as a US naval and air facility. Initially, the United States showed no interest in the site however the offer became increasingly attractive. To obtain a congressional appropriation for rehabilitating the military facilities on Ras Banas, the US required a written agreement from Egypt allowing the US to use the facilities. Sadat was reluctant to give his written agreement and insisted that his oral commitment would be appropriate. However, on his last visit to Washington, D.C., in 1981, he signed a letter allowing the US to use Ras Banas. The location of Ras Banas allowed it to potentially serve as a staging area for Persian Gulf operations and for other Middle Eastern and North African contingencies.

The initial plans produced by The Pentagon included making it a facility for CENTCOM troops and for staging B-52 bombers and C-5 transport aircraft. However, due to the absence of a written agreement by Egypt and the subsequent lack of approval for funding of the project at the time, the plans were dropped. The plans were resurrected after Egypt's written agreement, although were scaled down. The new plans scaled down the importance of the CENTCOM facility by constructing POL facilities. The proposals also included the construction of a water desalination plant with a water distribution network, improvements to the airfield (including the construction of a new runway), the construction of warehouses, fuel storage depots and barracks capable of holding 25,000 US troops. Egypt had reservations over the construction of a formal CENTCOM base on the site due to worries that this may form the subject of violence from radical Arabs. This was further reinforced following the assassination of Sadat in 1981. In May 1981, the plans were denounced by the Cairo-based newspaper Ash-Sha'b as "a threat to our independence and sovereignty." In 1982, Hosni Mubarak refused the construction of a permanent US airbase on Ras Banas although made it clear that Rapid Deployment Joint Task Force could use the military facilities on Ras Banas in the case of an actual emergency.

The cost of construction of the US military facilities was estimated to cost $522 million, making it the second most expensive project in Washington's Southwest Asia strategic network, only being surpassed by Diego Garcia. However, it was believed that costs could rise to as much as $1.6 billion. Of the costs being put forward for the development of Ras Banas, these included $7 million being given from the Secretary of Defense's contingency funds to establish construction mobilisation activities in 1982. However, in 1983, Egypt announced that it would develop Ras Banas without US aid after talks between the two countries broke down over the use of Ras Banas. However, talks recommenced resulting in an agreement that the base would be run jointly.

However, by 1985, when Europe refused to fund Egypt's regeneration of Ras Banas as a military base, the United States decided to abandon their ambitious project altogether. Despite this, the base is used by the United States for some military operations. For example, it was used as a port of call by the United States Sixth Fleet in the early months of the Gulf War.

The peninsula was rarely eyed by Abdel Fattah el-Sisi as a new population center for EGypt Vision 2030 just in case the exploding population of Greater Cairo moves to other cities and settlements.

== Climate ==
Köppen-Geiger climate classification system classifies its climate as hot desert (BWh).

Climate data for Ras Banas
Month	Jan	Feb	Mar	Apr	May	Jun	Jul	Aug	Sep	Oct	Nov	Dec	Year
Mean daily maximum °C (°F)	24.8 (76.6)	25.9 (78.6)	27.5 (81.5)	30.9 (87.6)	33.9 (93.0)	35.5 (95.9)	36.4 (97.5)	36.3 (97.3)	35 (95)	33.3 (91.9)	29.9 (85.8)	26.1 (79.0)	31.3 (88.3)
Daily mean °C (°F)	19.1 (66.4)	19.9 (67.8)	21.6 (70.9)	24.7 (76.5)	28.1 (82.6)	29.6 (85.3)	30.8 (87.4)	30.8 (87.4)	29.5 (85.1)	27.7 (81.9)	24.3 (75.7)	20.5 (68.9)	25.6 (78.0)
Mean daily minimum °C (°F)	13.4 (56.1)	13.9 (57.0)	15.7 (60.3)	18.6 (65.5)	22.4 (72.3)	23.7 (74.7)	25.2 (77.4)	25.4 (77.7)	24.1 (75.4)	22.1 (71.8)	18.7 (65.7)	15 (59)	19.8 (67.7)
Average precipitation mm (inches)	0 (0)	0 (0)	1 (0.0)	1 (0.0)	0 (0)	0 (0)	0 (0)	0 (0)	0 (0)	1 (0.0)	7 (0.3)	2 (0.1)	12 (0.4)
Source: Climate-Data.org

== Features ==
Ras Banas hosts a large airport with three asphalt runways, 9,914 feet (3,022 m), 9,900 feet (3,018 m) and 9,600 feet (2,926 m) in length. It is operated by the Egyptian Air Force.
