= Rocky Island (Egypt) =

Island in Egypt

Native name: جزيرة روكي
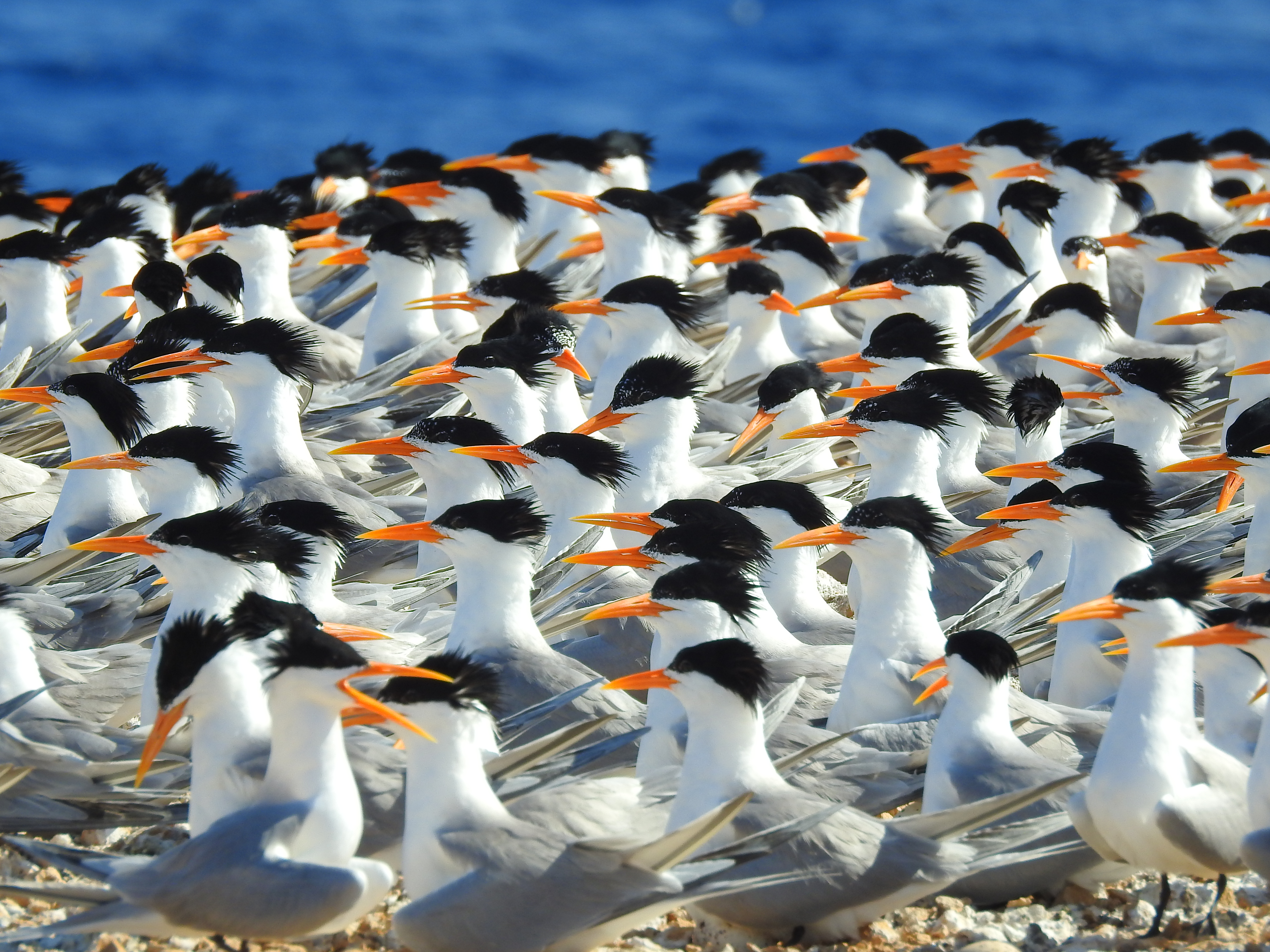
- Thalasseus bengalensis breeding on Rocky Island
- Interactive map of Rocky Island

Geography
- Location: Red Sea
- Coordinates: 23°33′50″N 36°14′43″E
- Total islands: 1

Administration
- Egypt

Demographics
- Population: Uninhabited

Rocky Island (Arabic: جزيرة روكي) is a small off-shore island of the Red Sea, lying 60–70 kilometres (37–43 mi) from the coast, out in the Red Sea Governorate of Egypt. This tiny uninhabited island gets some shelter from Zabargad Island (6 km [3.7 mi] to the northwest), but also gets fed from north–south currents, which attract lots of pelagic species that feed on or visit the resident marine life.

Rocky Island is well known by scuba divers as one that offers among the best diving sites in the Red Sea.
