= List of Egyptian castles, forts, fortifications and city walls =

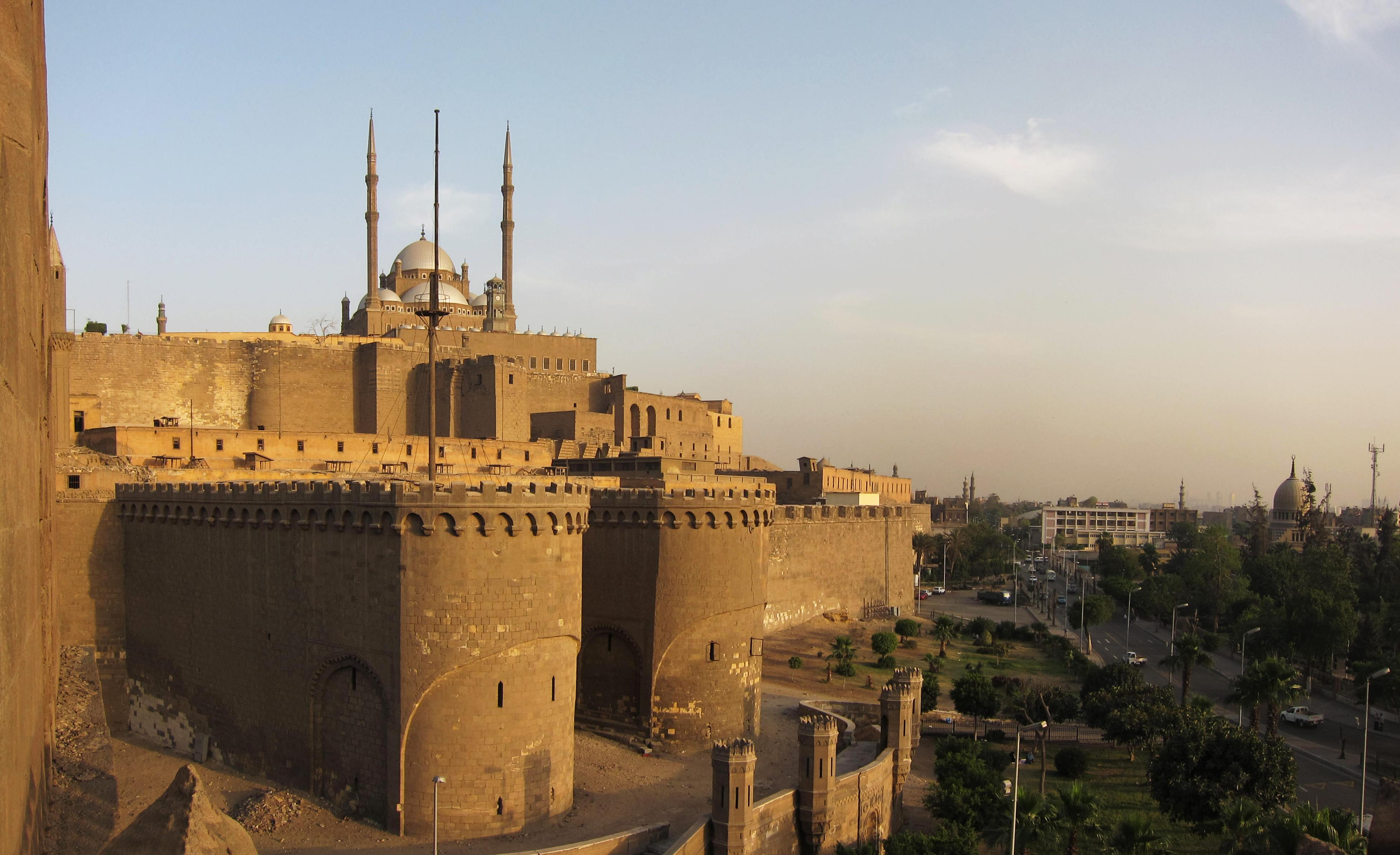
Cairo Citadel was first established by Saladin and later expanded by several rulers including Muhammad Ali Pasha. It is included in a World Heritage Site Historic Cairo.

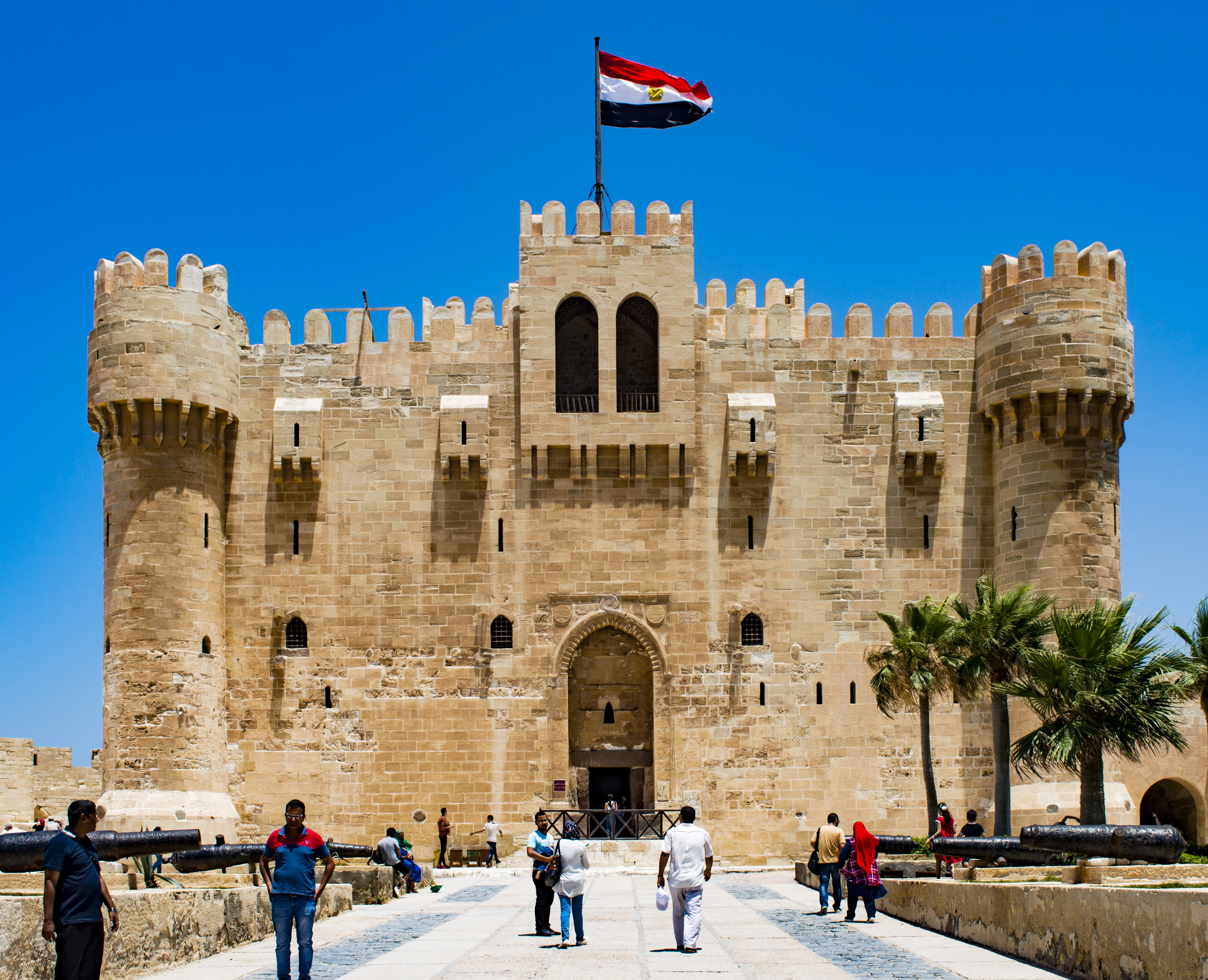
Qaitbay Citadel in Alexandria is one of the well preserved Egyptian castles.

Many buildings in Egypt can be put under the classification of castles, citadels, forts, and fortifications.

== List by age ==
=== Protodynastic period ===
- Tell es-Sakan – fortified settlement that likely was an administrative centre in an Egyptian colonial area in the southern Levant

=== Pharaonic ===
==== Lower Egypt ====
- Fortification of Memphis
- Fort of Walls of the Prince (inebw heka), Eastern Delta.
- Fortress of Wadi Natrun, western Delta.
- Rhakotis fort, Alexandria
- Tahpanhes fort or Castle of the Jew's Daughter
- Heliopolis Fortifications.

==== Middle Egypt ====
- Pi-Sekhemkheperre, near Herakleopolis Magna

==== Upper Egypt ====
- Edfu, fortified settlement of the First Intermediate Period
- Elephantine
- El-Kab fortifications
- Kom el-Ahmar (Hierakonpolis) fortifications
- Fortress of Abydos
- Medinet Habu New Kingdom fortification
- Thebes fortifications

==== Sinai ====
- The Way of Horus coastal forts, Sinai
- Tharu castle, Sinai
- Qantara East fort, Sinai
- Kolsum castle, Suez
- Boto Fort of Seti I, (Qatia area), Sinai.
- Tell-Huba Fortress, Sinai
- Pelusium Fort,
- Tharu city fortifications.

==== Western Desert ====
- Siwa Oasis fortification, Western desert of Egypt

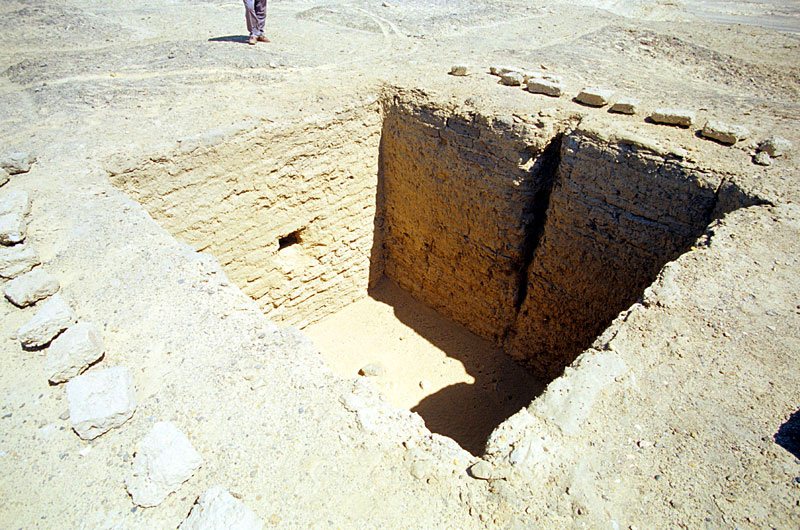
Excavated room inside the fort of Qasr Allam, Libyan desert, Egypt

- Qasr Allam fort

==== Nubia ====
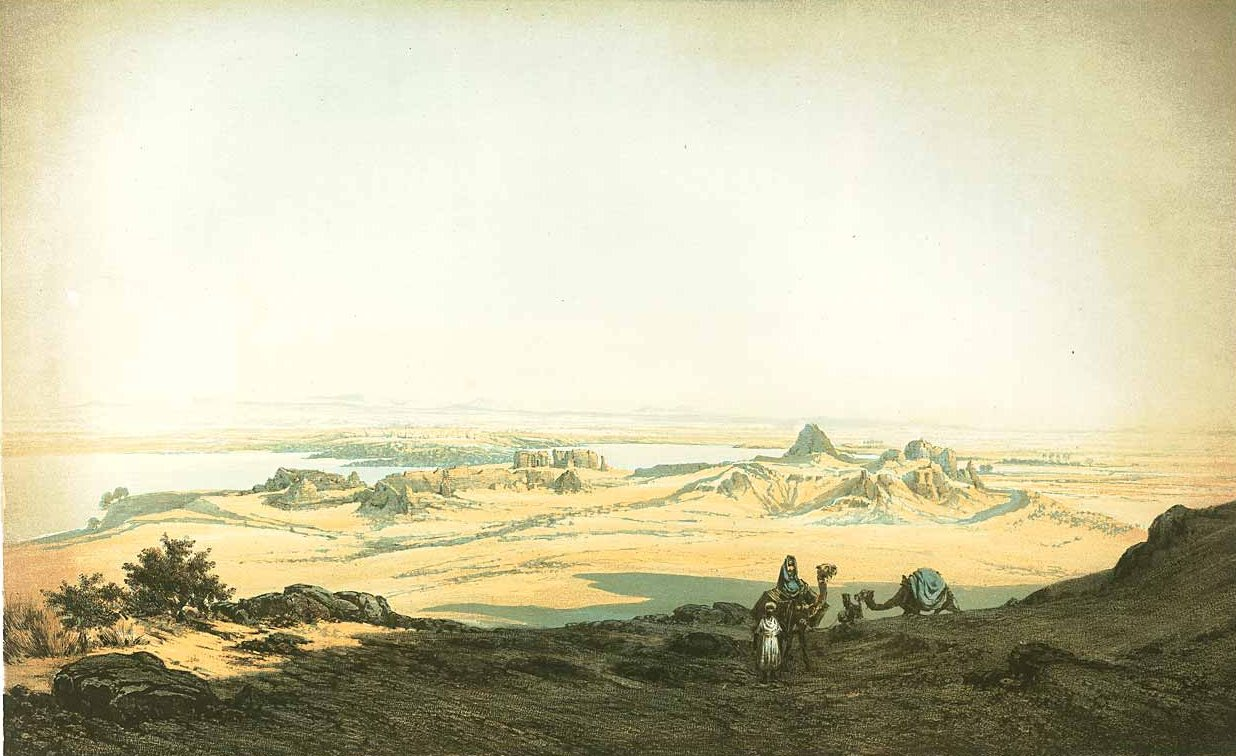
Semna & Kumma forts view from west

- The ancient castle at Buhen
- Fort of Kubban, Nubia
- Semna fortification
- Kumma fort
- Aniba Fort
- Uronarti fort
- Mirgissa fort
- Shalfak fort
- Askut fort
- Senusret I-III seventeen south fortresses.
- Dabenarti fort
- Faras Fort
- Serra Fort.

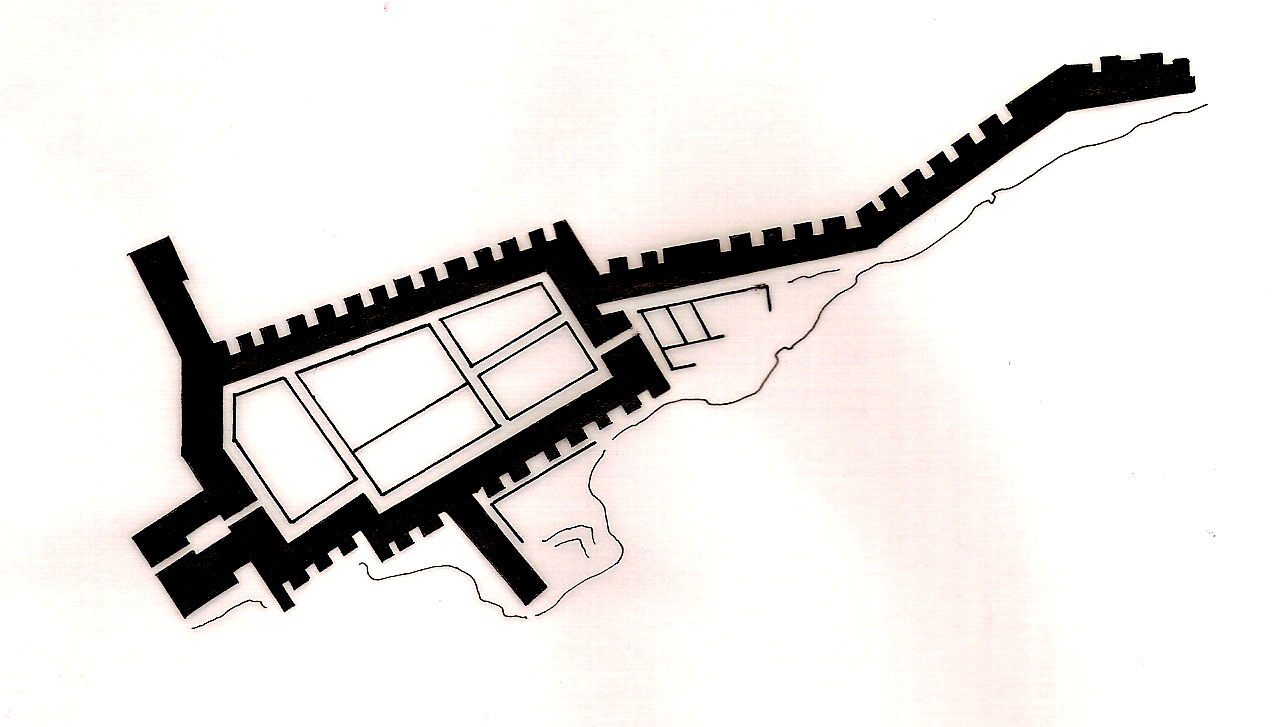
Shalfak fort plan

=== Persian ===
- Persian fort of Rhakortis, North coast

=== Greco-Roman ===
==== Cairo ====
- Fort Babylon, Cairo

==== Delta ====
- Naucratis Greek fort

==== Kharga Oasis ====
- Ain Umm Dabadib fort, Kharga Oasis.
- El Deir fort, Kharga Oasis.
- Qasr el Labeka fort, Kharga Oasis.
- Qasr Sumaria fort, Kharga Oasis.
- Qasr el Geb fort, Kharga Oasis.
- Al-Haiz fort, Bahariya Oasis.
- Nadura fort, Kharga Oasis
- Qasr el-Ghueita fort, Kharga Oasis
- Qasr el-Zayyan fort, Kharga Oasis

==== Red Sea ====
- Castellum of Badia, Gebel Abu Dukhan, near Hurghada, Red Sea
- Abu Sha'ar Fort, Red Sea.

==== Fayoum ====
- Temple of Stones fort, Fayoum.
- Der el Memun, fort where Anthony the Great lived, across from Faiyum.

==== Upper Egypt ====
- Al-Heita fort, Eastern desert, Qena.
- El-Iteima, on the Wadi Hammamat road.
- Seyala, on the Wadi Hammamat road.
- El-Hamrah, on the Wadi Hammamat road.
- El-Zerkah, on the Wadi Hammamat road.
- El-Fawakhir, on the Wadi Hammamat road.
- El-Hammamat, on the Wadi Hammamat road.
- El-Muweih, on the Wadi Hammamat road.
- Qasr el Banat, on the Wadi Hammamat road.
- El-Laqeita, on the Wadi Hammamat road.
- El-Matula, on the Wadi Hammamat road.
- Semna, Along the upper central desert route between Philoteras (believed to be Wadi Gawasis) and Kainopolis.
- El-Gidami, Along the upper central desert route between Philoteras (believed to be Wadi Gawasis) and Kainopolis.
- El-Qreiya, Along the upper central desert route between Philoteras (believed to be Wadi Gawasis) and Kainopolis.
- 'Aras, Along the upper central desert route between Philoteras (believed to be Wadi Gawasis) and Kainopolis.

==== Sinai ====
- Saint Catherine's Monastery fortification, Mount Sinai in the Sinai Peninsula (by Justinian I 548–565)

==== North coast ====
- Alexandria fortifications
- Taposiris Magna Fortress, Alexandria

=== Islamic ===
==== Cairo ====
- Cairo Citadel, Mukkattam, Cairo
- Ayyubid Cairo City Fortification
- Gates of Cairo
- Al Fustat city walls

==== Alexandria ====
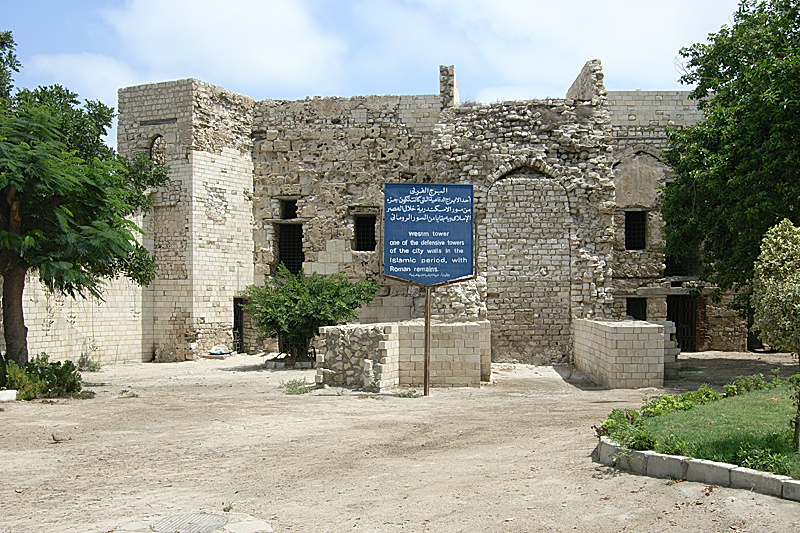
Western tower of the Greek & Islamic town wall, Alexandria, Egypt

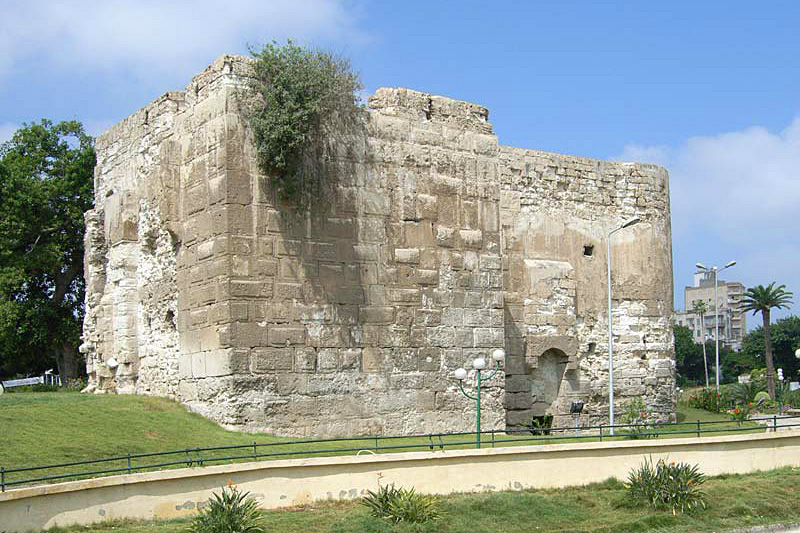
Western tower, remains of the Hellenistic & Islamic city wall, Alexandria, Egypt

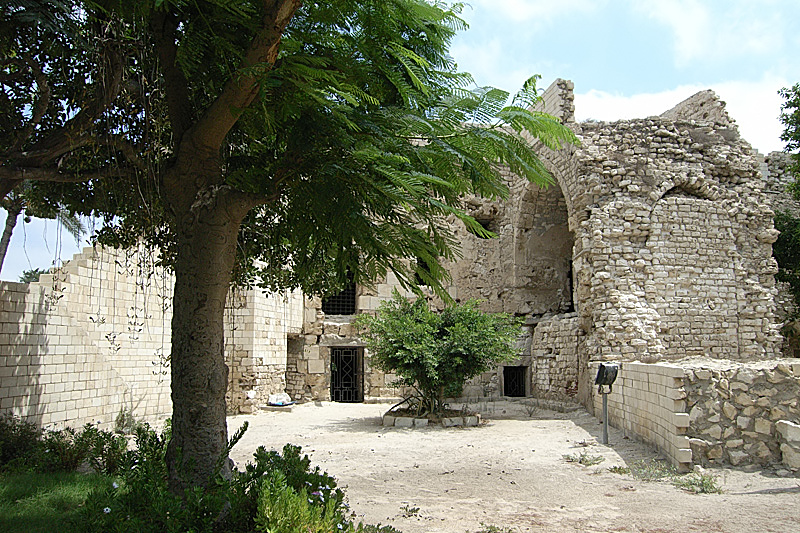
Western tower of the Greek town wall, Alexandria, Egypt

- Citadel of Qaitbay, Alexandria
- Fortification of Bab Rosetta, Alexandria
- Qaitbey Citadel, Rosetta (known as Fort Julien)

==== Red Sea and Eastern desert ====
- Quseir Castle

==== Sinai ====
- Salah El-Din castle, Pharaoh's Island, Sinai
- Nweiba' Castle
- Qalaat Al-Gindi, Ras Sedr, Sinai
- Al-Arish citadel
- Nakhl citadel
- Farma citadel
- El Tina castle, North Sinai

==== Western desert ====
- Siwa oasis fort
- Shali fortified village, Siwa Oasis.

=== Modern Egypt ===
==== Alexandria and North coast ====
- Fort Julien, Rosetta Fort.
- Agami Fort, Alexandria (by French occupation)
- Abu Qir Castle (was used by Mohammed Ali as a prison)

==== Western Desert ====
- Mersa Matruh Fortifications (1941 AD)
- Sidi Barrani Fortifications (1941 AD)
- Alam el Halfa Fortifications (1941 AD)
- Sollum fortified base camp (1941 AD)
- Halfaya Pass Fortification (1941 AD)
- Bir-Hakeim fort (1942 AD)

==== Sinai ====
- Al-Arish castle
- Sharm El-Sheikh fortification by Egypt (1954 AD)
- Castle Zaman, Sinai

==== Suez Canal ====
- Adgerud castle, Suez.
- Kolsum castle, Suez.
- Bar Lev Line
  - Fort Lahtzanit
  - Fort Budapest

==== Red Sea and Eastern Desert ====
- Green Island (Egypt) Fortification, Red Sea (1969 AD)
- Shadwan island fortifications, Red Sea (1960s AD)

== List by areas and time ==
=== Western Desert ===
- Zawiyet Umm el-Rakham, a Ramesside fort near the Libyan coast where trade goods were found. For example, cakes of Egyptian blue pigment, brought there for export, were found, along with indications of exotic imports such as olive oil and wine.

=== Alexandria ===
- Citadel of Qaitbay
- Fort Pharos
- Fort Silsileh
- Fort Adda
- Fort Ras-el-Tin
- Fort Marabout
- Fort Adjemi
- Marza-el-Kana
- Citadel of Mex
- Fort Kamaria
- Fort Om Qabeba
- Fort Saleh Aga

=== Rosetta ===
- Fort Julien

=== Damietta ===
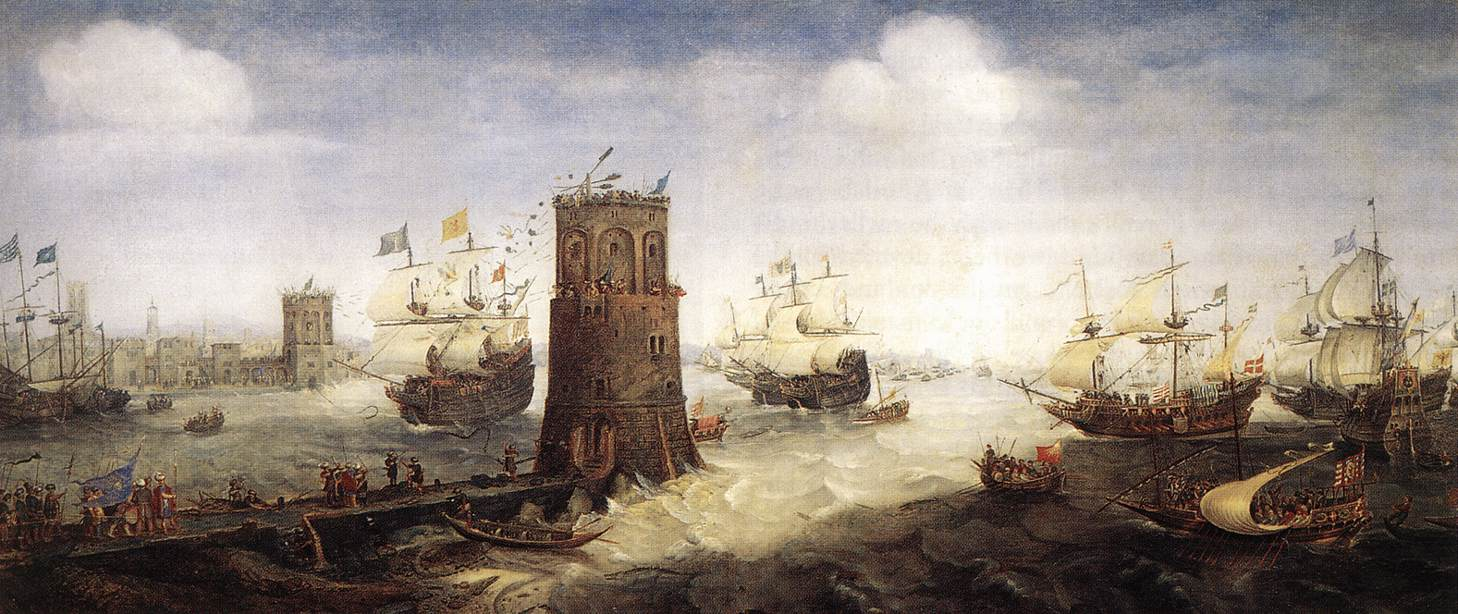
Damietta fortification and Tower 1600s

- Ezzbet El-Borg Defensive tower.
- Urabi Fort.
- Old Damietta city wall and Fortifications.

=== Sinai castles, forts, fortifications and citadels ===
- 13th century BC The Way of Horus coastal and Sinai forts.
- 13th century BC Tharu castle.
- 13th century BC Boto Fort (by Seti I), (Qatia area), Sinai.
- 13th century BC Tel Habwa Fort (by Seti I), (Qantara area), Sinai
- 13th century BC Tel Kadwa Fort, Sinai
- 13th century BC Tel Al Hebr Fort, Sinai
- 13th century BC Kharouba Fort, Sinai
- 13th century BC Baer Al-Abd Fort, Sinai
- Unknown time Pharonic El Tina castle, Beer Al Abd, North Sinai
- Circa 100 BC Ptolemaic Fort of Tal Abou Sayfi, South of Qantara Sharq city.
- 200 AD Roman Fort of Tal Abou Sayfi, South of Qantara Sharq city (by Emperor Maximinus Thrax).
- Unknown time Roman Lahfen castle near Al-Arish.
- Saint Catherine's Monastery fortification, Mount Sinai, Sinai Peninsula.
- 640 AD Farma (Pelusium) citadel.
- 7th century AD Justinian's Strasini Fort, Tel Felosiyia, near Pelusium.
- 7th century AD Garha Roman fort, on Bardawil lake, North Sinai.
- Unknown time Byzantine fort, qaseema, Hosna, Middle Sinai.
- Unknown time Al-Mohammadyia Arabic Fort, Beer Al Abd, North Sinai.
- 1115 AD Al-Soubak Fort (by Baldwin), Wadi Araba.
- 1116 AD Aiyla fort (by Baldwin), Aiyla city, Aqaba bay.
- 1116 AD Pharaoh Island Fort (by Baldwin), Aqaba bay.
- 1117 AD Wadi Musa fort (by Baldwin).
- 1181 AD Aiyla Island Castle (by Ayyobids).
- 1182 AD Salah El-Din castle Sedr, Sinai.
- 1184 AD Qalaat Al-Gindi (by Saladin), Ras Sedr, Sinai.
- 1184 AD Salah El-Din castle, Taba (Pharaoh Island), Sinai.
- 1516 AD Al-Arish citadel (by Al-Ashraf Qansuh al-Ghawri).
- 1516 AD Al-Baghla fort (by Al-Ashraf Qansuh al-Ghawri).
- 1516 AD Naqab Al-Aqaba Fort(by Al-Ashraf Qansuh al-Ghawri).
- 1516 AD An-Nakhl Fortress (by Al-Ashraf Qansuh al-Ghawri).
- 1799 AD Qatiyah Fort, West of sinai (by General Lograng of Napoleon Army).
- 1799 Siege of El Arish Castle
- 1893 Nuweiba Castle.
- 1910s Turkish Fortifications at Hosna, middle Sinai.
- 1910s Turkish Fortifications at Al-Arish Castle, North Sinai.
- 1910s Turkish Fortifications at Nekhel, Sinai.
- 1910s Turkish Fortifications at Salah El Din Castle, South Sinai.
- 1960s and 1970s Egyptian defensive fortifications built by Egyptian armed forces during the War of Attrition on the Western bank of Suez Canal, and the Bar Lev Line of fortifications built on Eastern side of Suez Canal by Israel.
- 1990s Touristic Castle Zaman, Sinai
- Unknown time Ain al Qudairat Fort, Hosna, North Sinai.

== See also ==
- Qasr (disambiguation)
- List of buildings
- List of fortifications
- List of castles
- List of forts
- List of walls
- List of cities with defensive walls
- List of established military terms (Engineering)
