= El Qoseir Fort =

Ottoman fort in El Qoseir

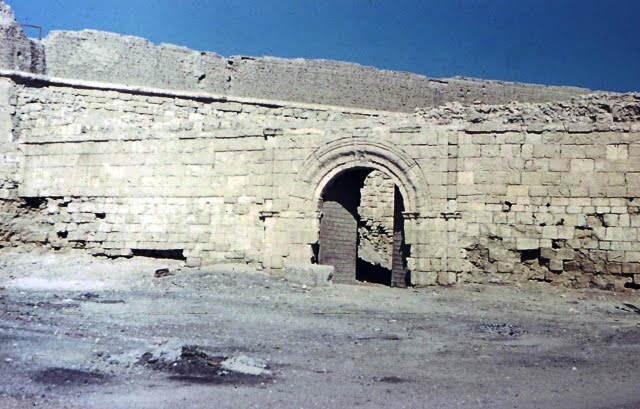

General information
- Location: El Qoseir, Egypt
- Coordinates: 26.10523°N 34.28305°E
- Year built: 1570s

Dimensions
- Circumference: 365 meters (Note: Based on Irwin's measurement from 1780)

The El Qoseir Fort is an Ottoman fort located in El Qoseir, Egypt. The fort was built on the recommendation of Sinan Pasha in the late 16th century, and it saw notable use during the Napoleonic era. It is a museum in the modern period.

== Description ==
Sinan Pasha suggested the construction of a fort at El Qoseir for the purposes of providing security for the local town. However, according to archeologist Charles Le Quesne, (Note: Le Quesne used records, context, and archeological work to advance understanding of the fort.) Sinan Pasha might have had additional strategic intentions given the Ottoman conflicts in Yemen at the time. The fort would have also provided security for traveling pilgrims.

In the 1770s, about two hundred years after the foundation of the fort, poet Eyles Irwin visited, and he provided the following description:

The fort of Cosire stands upon a rising ground; and is a square building of about four hundred yards in circumference. It was formerly strong enough, to have withstood a regular attack; the walls being of stone, and raised to a considerable height. But at present, it is in a defenceless state; the breaches which time has made in it, being repaired with mud-work, and not more than three dismantled pieces of cannon left to protect it.

— Eyles Irwin, A Series of Adventures in the Course of a Voyage Up the Red-Sea (1780)

In the 1790s, Napoleon's army occupied the fort and resisted a siege by British naval forces. The fort was rebuilt and then abandoned by the French. Later occupants included the Egyptian Army. By World War II, the town began to expand around the fort which had only rested on the edge of the town up until that time. The fort is a museum in the modern period, and it currently houses a replica of a historical dhow provided by a heritage program of the Red Sea Governorate.

== Architecture ==
The fort contains a tower and barracks.

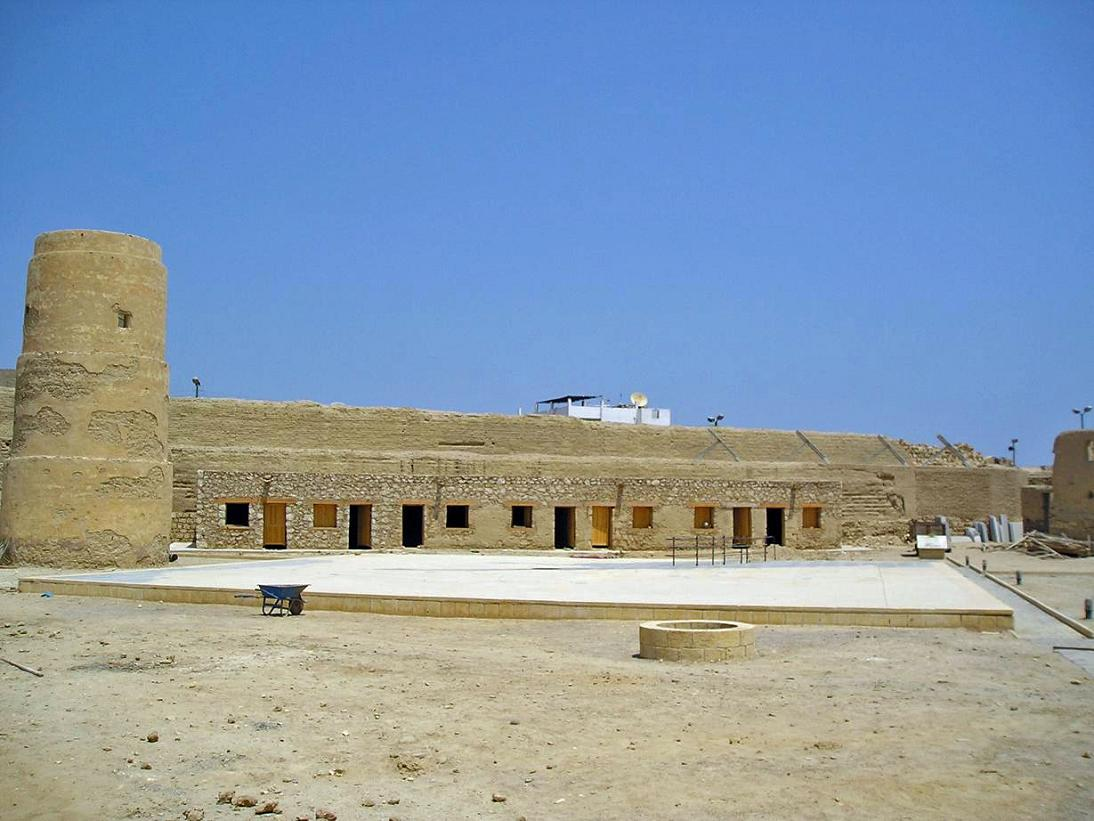
Tower and rooms

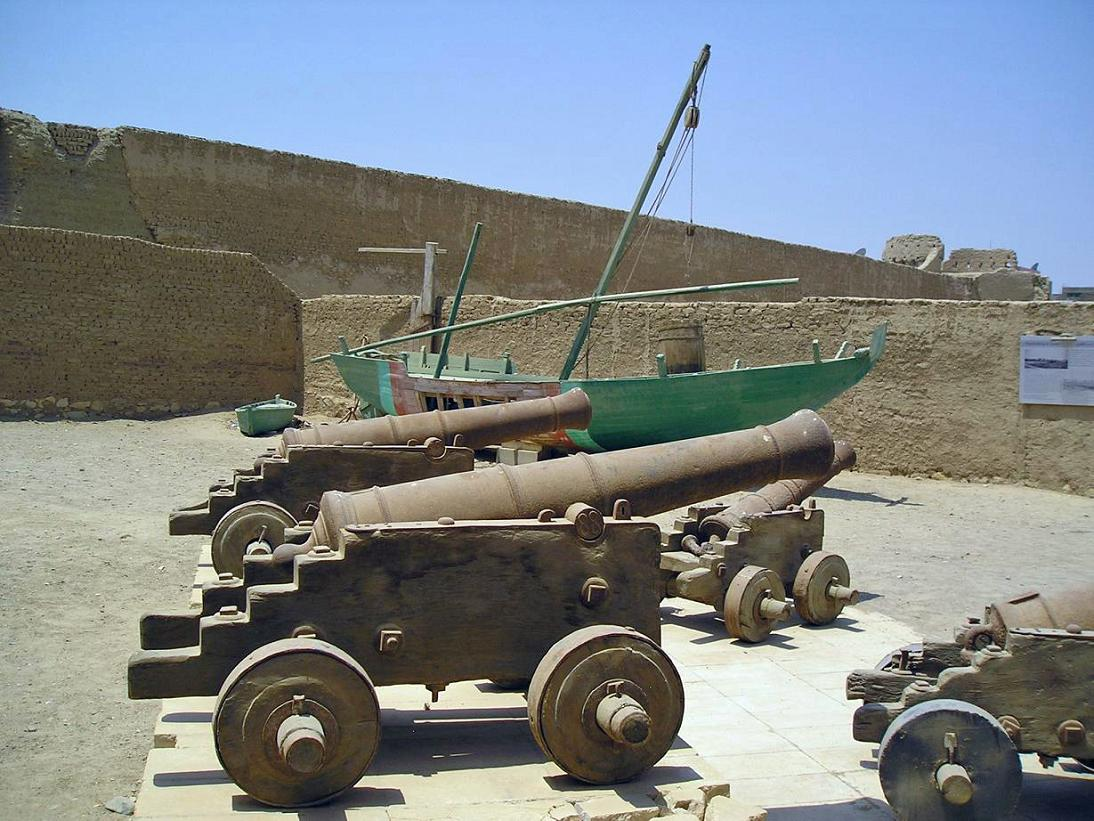
Green dhow behind several cannons

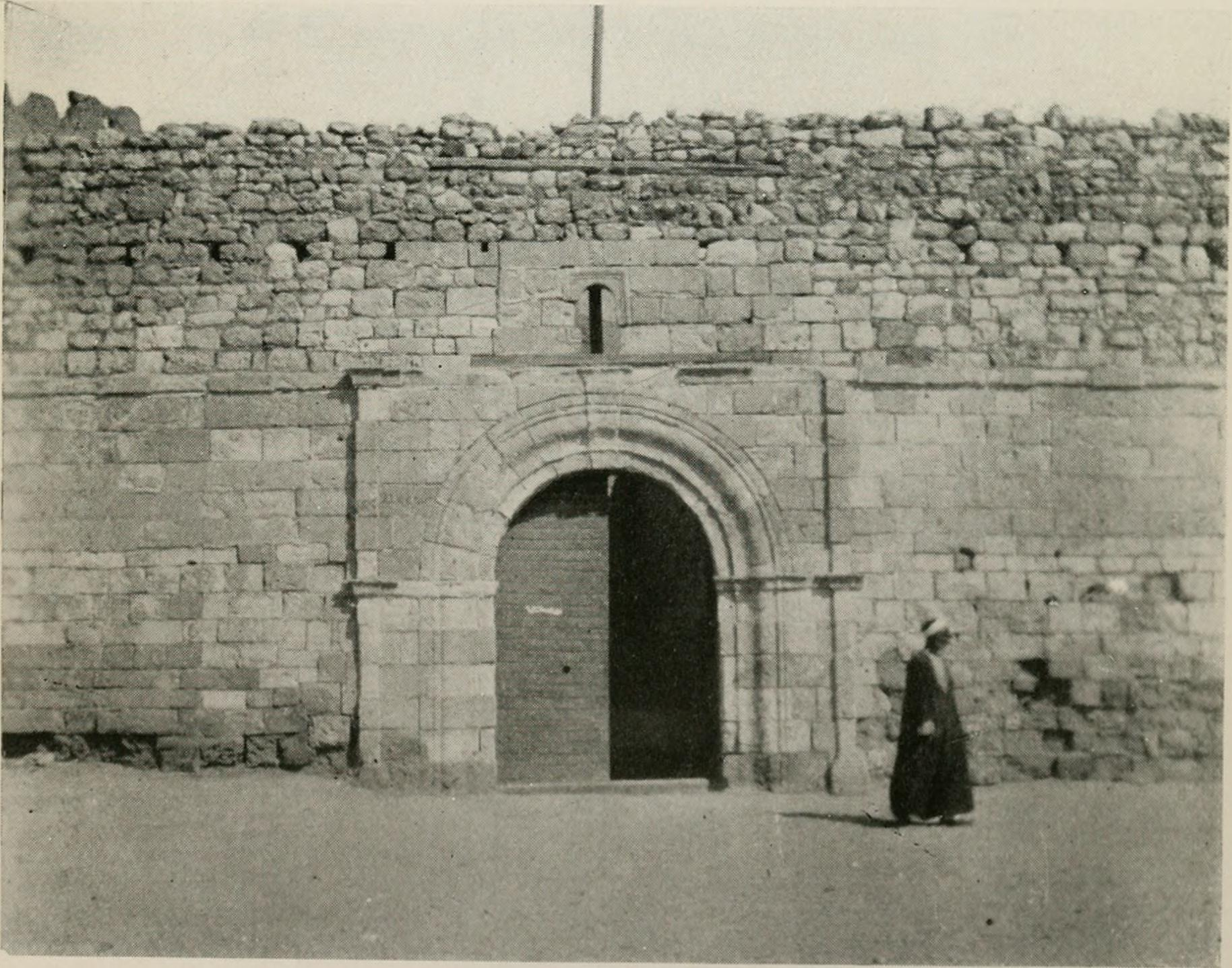
A portal in 1913

== See also ==
- List of Egyptian castles, forts, fortifications and city walls
- Ottoman architecture in Egypt
