= El Qoseir =

El Qoseir القصير (Arabic)
- Town
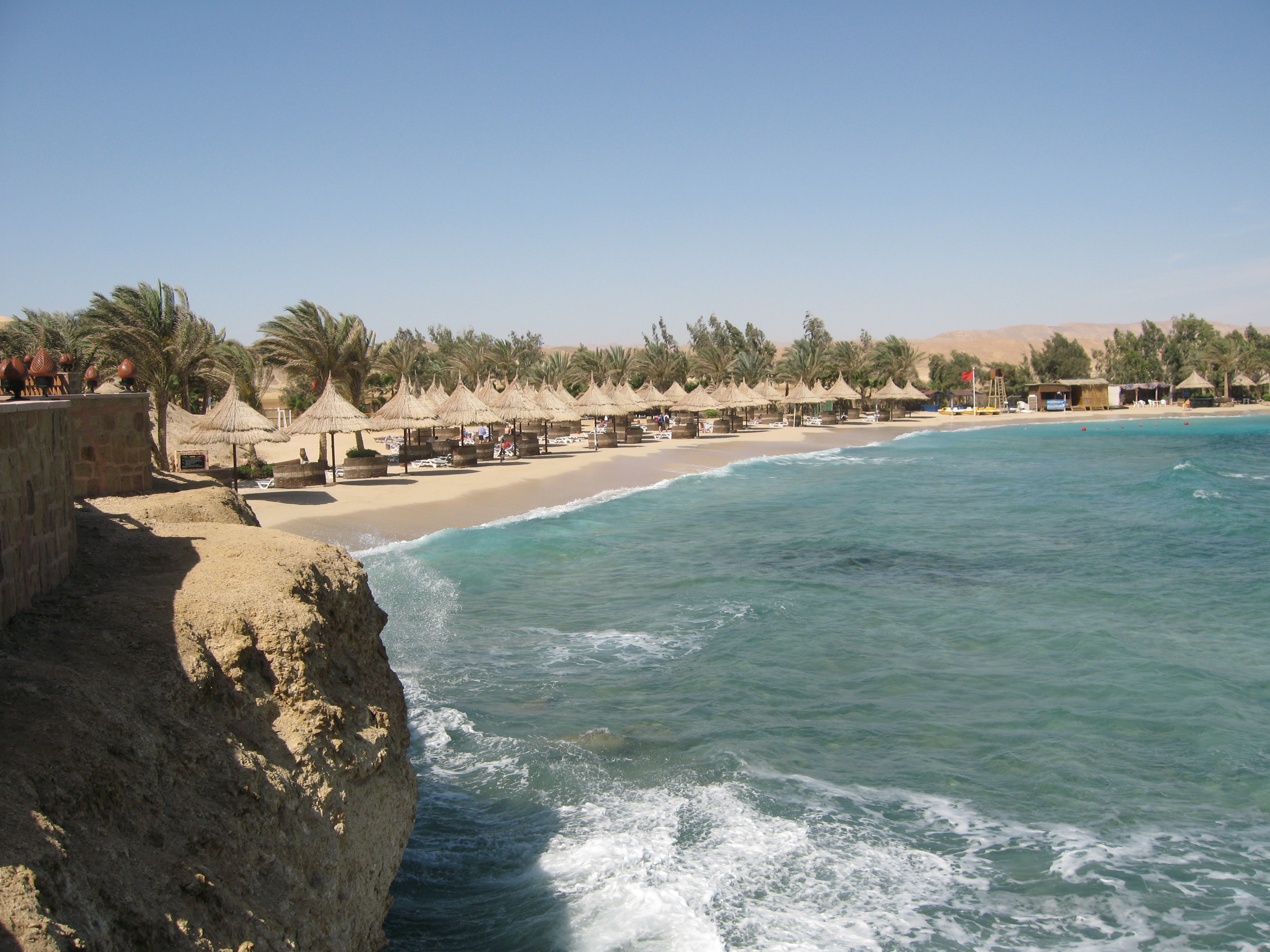
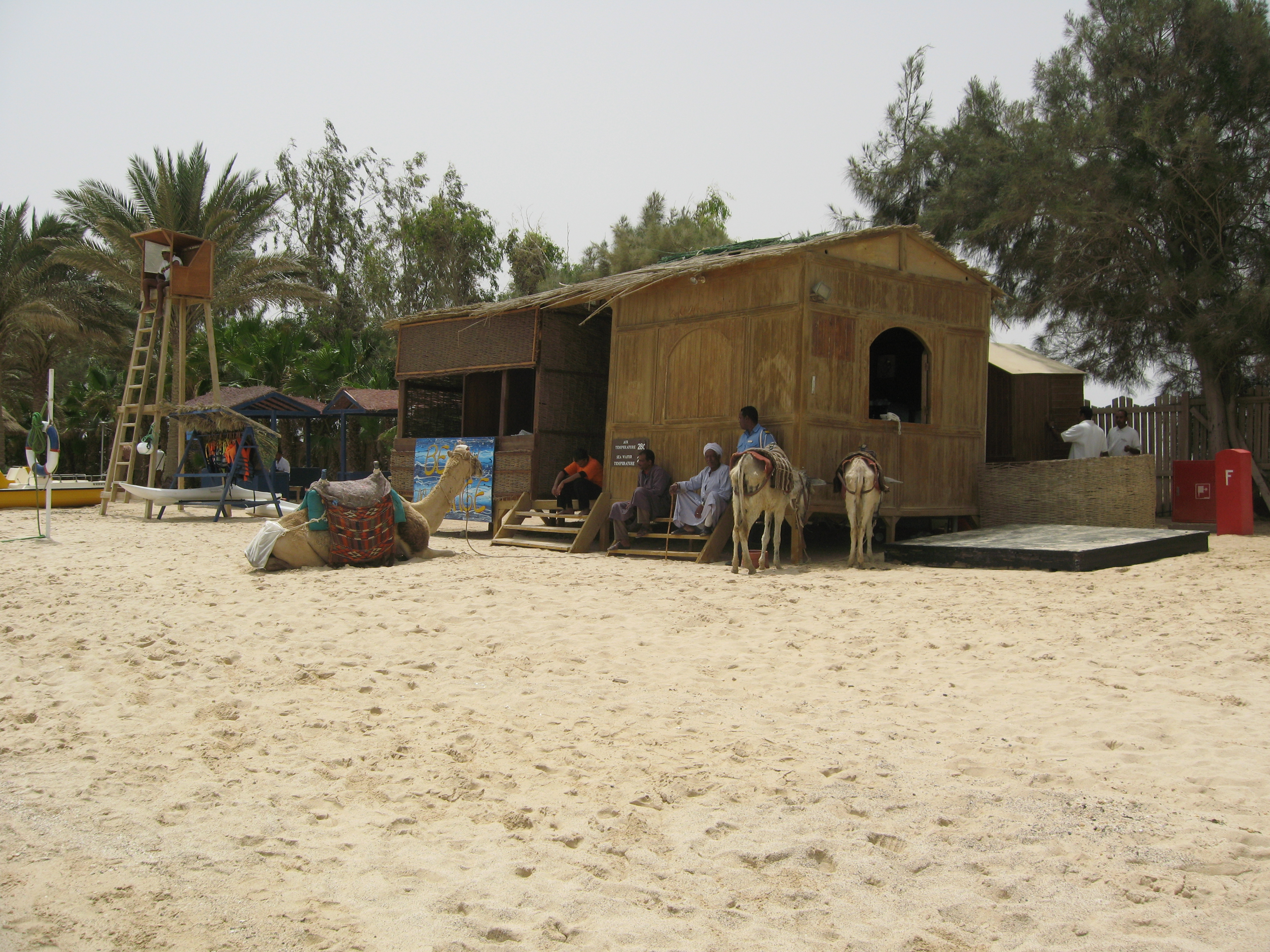
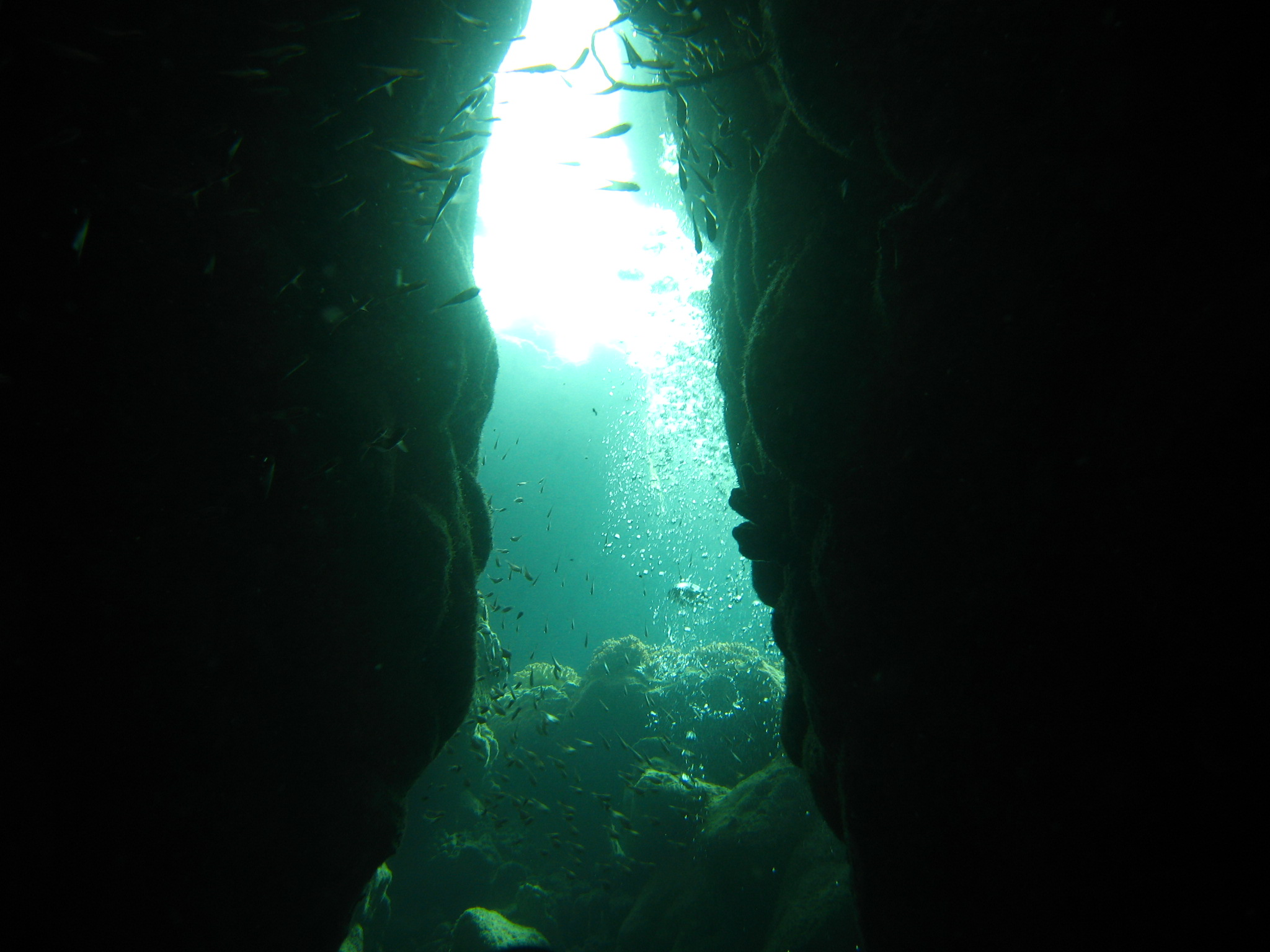
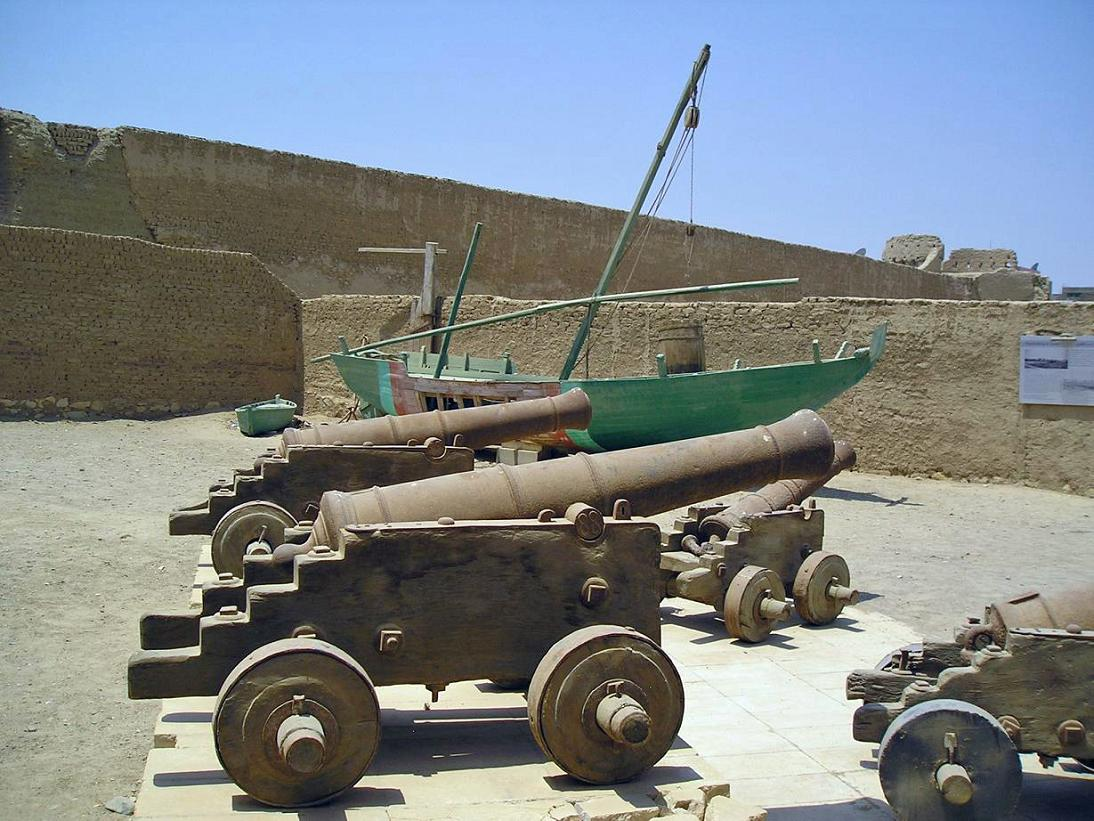
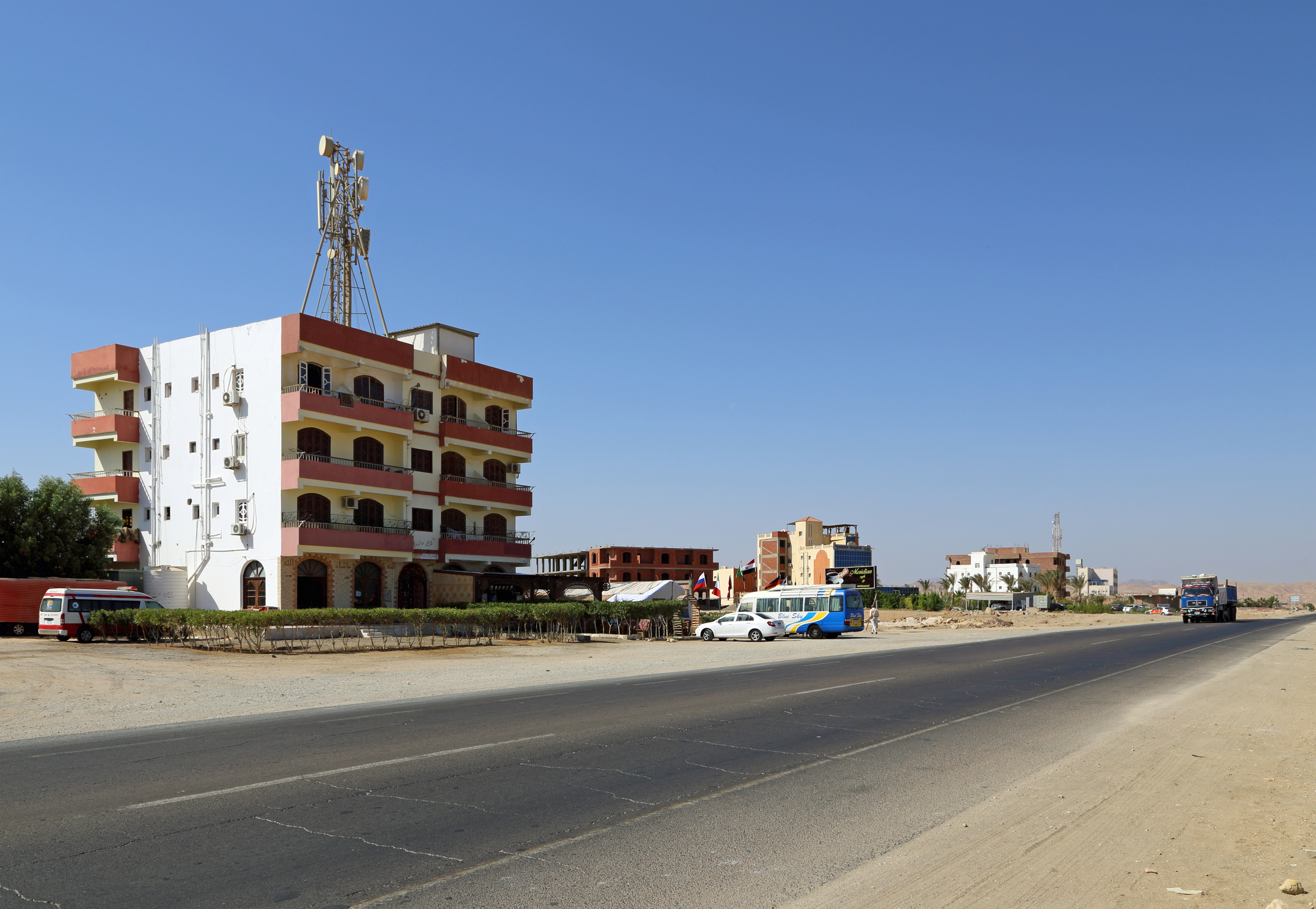
- Clockwise from top: View of the sea, Under the sea, road from Al-Qusair to Safaga, El Qoseir Fort, Camels for rides on the beach

- Location in Egypt
- Coordinates: 26°06′14″N 34°16′52″E
- Country: Egypt
- Governorate: Red Sea

Area
  - Total: 65.9 km^{2} (25.4 sq mi)
- Elevation: 21 m (69 ft)

Population (2023)
  - Total: 52,558
  - Density: 798/km^{2} (2,070/sq mi)
- Time zone: UTC+2 (EET)
  - Summer (DST): UTC+3 (EEST)

El Qoseir (Note: Also spelled Kosseir, Al Qusair, El Quseir, Quseir, Qusseir or Qosseir.) (Arabic: القصير, romanized: el-Qoṣēr, pronounced [elʔoˈsˤeːɾ]) is a city in eastern Egypt, located on the Red Sea west coast. Populated for approximately 5,000 years, its ancient Egyptian name was Tjau, while its ancient Greek name during the Ptolemaic era was Myos Hormos. Historically, it was the endpoint of the Wadi Hammamat trail, an important route connecting Egypt and the Red Sea.

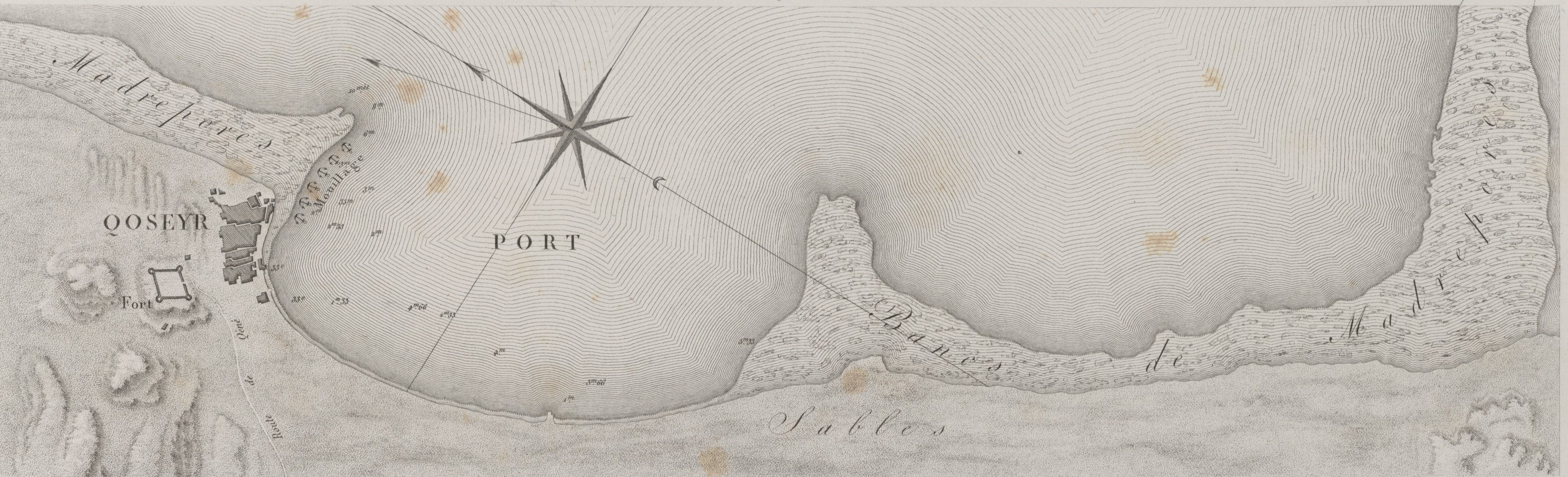
Map c.1800

El Qoseir is located 138 kilometers south of Hurghada, 130 km north of Marsa Alam and 68 km north of the Marsa Alam International Airport. In 1986, its population was approximately 20,000. Today, the population of El Qoseir is around 50,000.

== Climate ==
Köppen-Geiger climate classification system classifies its climate as hot desert (BWh). Summers are hot and winters are warm. Winter night temperatures in El Qoseir, along with those of Marsa Alam and Sharm El Sheikh are the warmest of any other cities and resorts in Egypt. Rain is very rare, as in most of Egypt. Seasonal variation is small, comparable to Marsa Alam, but its summer days are cooler, even cooler than similar more northern areas at the Red Sea, like Hurghada and Sharm El Sheikh.

The highest record temperature was 46 °C (115 °F), recorded on July 12, 1983, while the coldest record temperature was 1 °C (34 °F), recorded on January 6, 1976.

Climate data for El Qoseir
Month	Jan	Feb	Mar	Apr	May	Jun	Jul	Aug	Sep	Oct	Nov	Dec	Year
Record high °C (°F)	30.4 (86.7)	31.4 (88.5)	38.3 (100.9)	42.2 (108.0)	44.6 (112.3)	41.0 (105.8)	37.6 (99.7)	38.3 (100.9)	36.4 (97.5)	36.7 (98.1)	32.8 (91.0)	31.3 (88.3)	44.6 (112.3)
Mean daily maximum °C (°F)	21.9 (71.4)	22.6 (72.7)	24.5 (76.1)	27.1 (80.8)	29.8 (85.6)	31.8 (89.2)	32.6 (90.7)	32.7 (90.9)	31.6 (88.9)	29.3 (84.7)	24.7 (76.5)	23.2 (73.8)	27.7 (81.9)
Daily mean °C (°F)	17.8 (64.0)	18.5 (65.3)	20.5 (68.9)	23.5 (74.3)	26.4 (79.5)	28.8 (83.8)	29.6 (85.3)	29.9 (85.8)	28.3 (82.9)	25.9 (78.6)	22.5 (72.5)	19.2 (66.6)	24.2 (75.6)
Mean daily minimum °C (°F)	13.8 (56.8)	14.3 (57.7)	16.4 (61.5)	19.7 (67.5)	22.7 (72.9)	25.4 (77.7)	26.1 (79.0)	26.4 (79.5)	25.0 (77.0)	22.4 (72.3)	17.8 (64.0)	15.5 (59.9)	20.5 (68.9)
Record low °C (°F)	9.0 (48.2)	8.8 (47.8)	9.2 (48.6)	12.7 (54.9)	16.6 (61.9)	21.2 (70.2)	21.3 (70.3)	23.0 (73.4)	18.1 (64.6)	17.5 (63.5)	12.4 (54.3)	9.3 (48.7)	8.8 (47.8)
Average precipitation mm (inches)	0 (0)	0 (0)	0 (0)	0 (0)	0 (0)	0 (0)	0 (0)	0 (0)	0 (0)	1 (0.0)	1 (0.0)	1 (0.0)	3 (0.1)
Average precipitation days (≥ 1.0 mm)	0	0	0.1	0.1	0	0	0	0	0	0.3	0.5	0	1.0
Average relative humidity (%)	51	48	50	50	48	48	50	51	54	56	54	54	51.2
Mean daily sunshine hours	9	10	10	10	11	13	13	12	11	10	10	9	11
Source 1: NOAA, Climate Charts
Source 2: Voodoo Skies for record temperatures, Weather2Travel for sunshine

El Qoseir mean sea temperature
Jan	Feb	Mar	Apr	May	Jun	Jul	Aug	Sep	Oct	Nov	Dec
23 °C (73 °F)	22 °C (72 °F)	22 °C (72 °F)	23 °C (73 °F)	25 °C (77 °F)	26 °C (79 °F)	28 °C (82 °F)	29 °C (84 °F)	28 °C (82 °F)	27 °C (81 °F)	26 °C (79 °F)	24 °C (75 °F)

== See also ==
- Hurghada
- Marsa Alam
- Red Sea Riviera
