= Castle of Saladin, Pharaoh's Island =

Castle on Pharaoh's Island, Egypt

Castle of Saladin
- Pharaoh's Island, South Sinai, Egypt
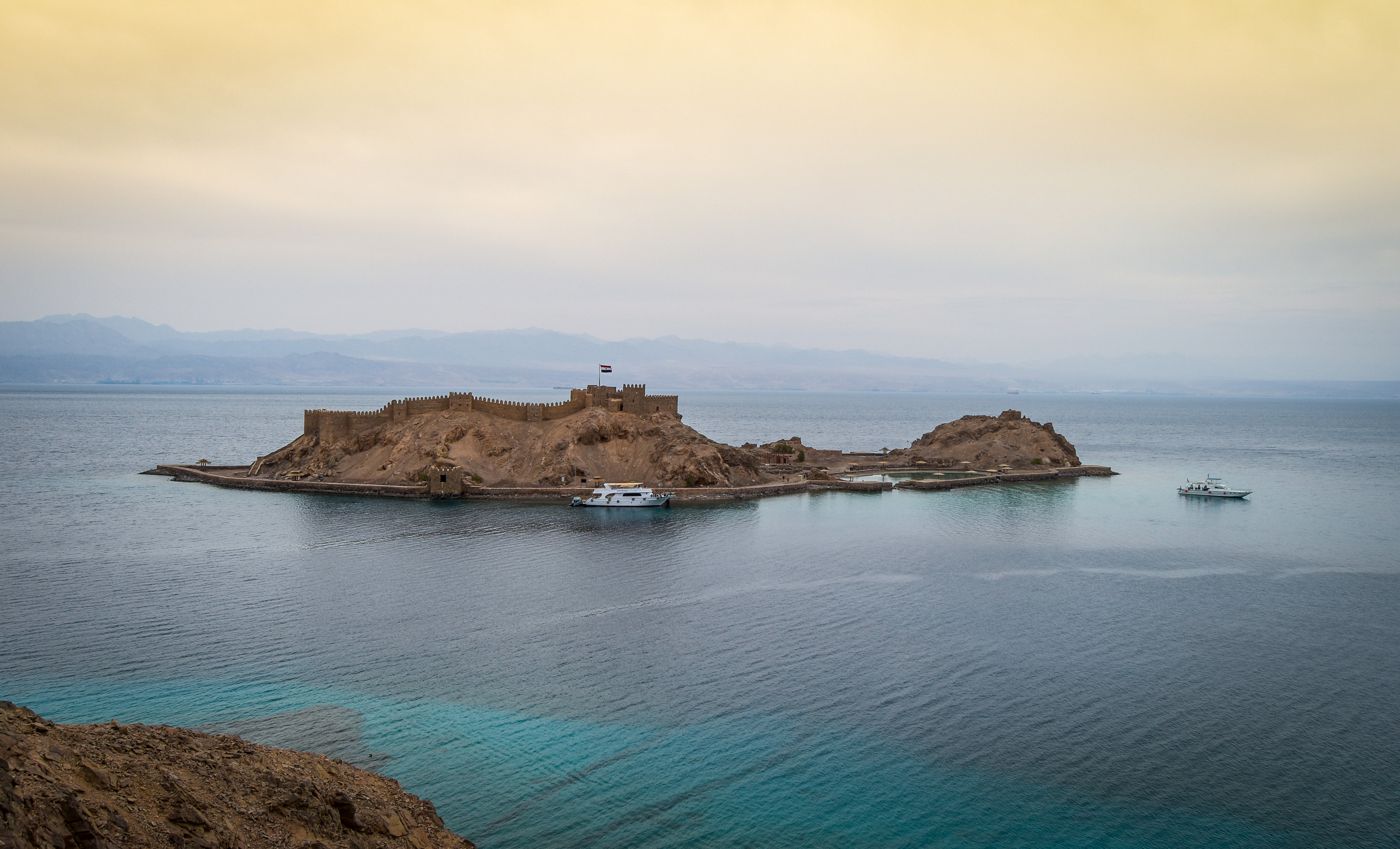
- View of the Castle

Site information
- Type: Citadel
- Condition: Intact

Site history
- Built: (original construction): 1116; 1170 (major modifications)
- Materials: stone

The Castle of Saladin is located on Pharaoh's Island in northwestern tip of the Gulf of Aqaba, Egypt. The castle is composed from two parts (Northern and Southern).

== History ==
It has been claimed that this was built by Baldwin I, who was the King of Jerusalem, in 1116 AD because the island was situated on a place of strategical importance: in the crossroads of trade and pilgrim routes from Egypt (Sinai) and Syro-Palestine to the Arab Peninsula with holy Mecca. The Crusaders allegedly pursued two objectives: for one thing, to defend southeastern corner of the Kingdom of Jerusalem against its Muslim neighbours, for another, to exact a ransom from the passing Muslim pilgrims. Location of the castle was easily defendable on high ground, in the narrowest part on the Gulf of Aqaba. According to archaeologist Adrian Boas there is, however, no evidence of Frankish occupation of the island. Fulcher of Chartres mentions that when King Baldwin travelled down to the city of Elim (Ailah), the locals fled to the island by boat, but he does not describe the Franks pursuing them or taking the island.

The castles played a major role in the Crusades as well as during the Mamluk and Ottoman eras. A battle allegedly took place on the island in about 1170 where the fortress was captured by Salah El-Din, who largely expanded the fortress. It unclear who he captured it from, however, and there are no records of a Frankish garrison being present. After that period the Mamelukes and Ottomans had some further additions to the fortress. The fortress has many small rooms, which include sleeping quarters for troops, bathhouses, and kitchens with huge ovens. There are towers for pigeons, which were used for relaying messages and also circular towers for archers.

== See also ==
- List of Egyptian castles, forts, fortifications and city walls
