= Pharaoh's Island =

Island in the Gulf of Aqaba, Egypt

Coordinates: 29°27′48″N 34°51′34″E

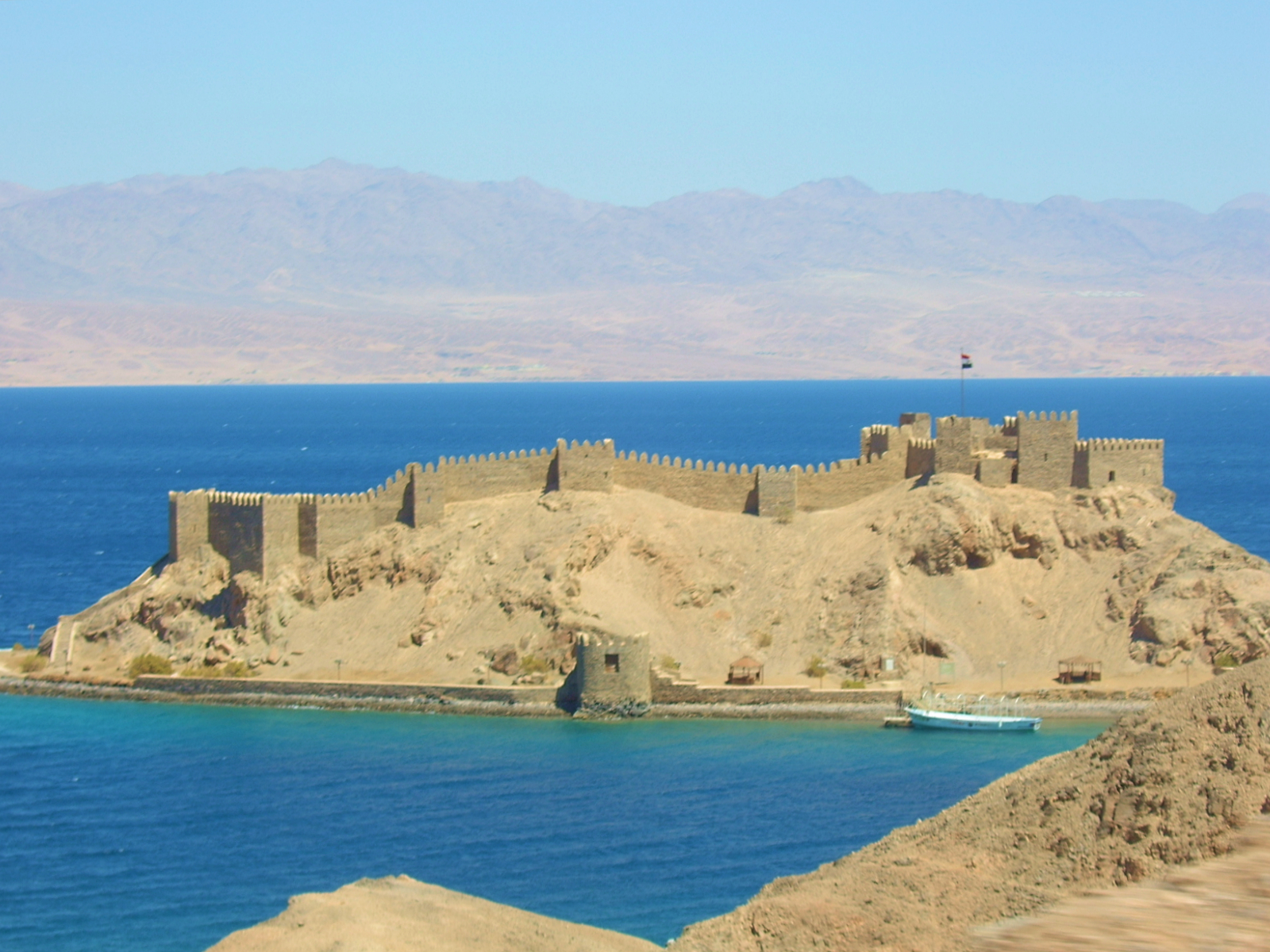
Restored medieval fortress on Pharaoh's Island

Pharaoh's Island (Arabic: جَزِيْرَةُ فِرعَون Jazīratu Firʽawn), whose current popular name is Coral Island, is a small island in the northern Gulf of Aqaba some 250 metres (820 ft) east off the shore of Egypt's eastern Sinai Peninsula. Some scholars identify this island port with biblical Ezion-Geber. The island holds the ruins of a medieval fortress, officially known as Saladin's Castle.

== Geography ==
In spite of its second name, "Coral Island", Jazirat Fir'aun consists of solid granite. It stands some 13 kilometres (8.1 mi) southwest of modern Eilat.

With a length of 350 metres (380 yd) from north to south, and 170 metres (190 yd) at its widest point, the island covers an area of 3.9 hectares (9.6 acres) and is separated from the shore west of it by a shallow lagoon, about 250 metres (270 yd) wide, only accessible by boat at high tide, which served in the 13th century as a sheltered anchorage. Additionally, the island has a harbour of 35 by 65 metres (38 yd × 71 yd) whose now very heavily silted basin offered even more protection. It has been noted by some scholars that the harbour was created artificially and corresponds to the mainly Phoenician cothon type.

The island and its harbour stood at the junction of sea and land routes, the former connecting to Southern Arabia and East Africa, and the latter leading north to Syria and across the Sinai to Egypt.

== History ==
=== Iron Age ===
There have been many attempts to identify biblical Ezion-Geber and Eloth, with scholars like Beno Rothenberg in 1967, A. Flinder in 1977 and 1989, and Avner Raban in 1997 offering arguments in favour of Pharaoh's Island being the port of Ezion-Geber.

Midianite and Negev pottery were found on the island, which are best known from the 13th-12th centuries BCE (end of the Bronze Age and beginning of the Iron Age) and the Iron Age, respectively. A casemate wall with towers that surrounds the island at shore level, including the harbour, could not be positively dated yet. During a dig in one of its rooms, two sherds of Negev pottery were found in the petrified debris, but not at floor level, which excludes them as a safe indicator of the wall's age. There were attempts at interpreting the island as a staging post for Egyptian expeditions to the copper mines of Timna, but the oldest sherds found, the Iron Age Midianite and Negev ware, are of younger date than the Egyptian expeditions, Rothenberg placing them in the Iron Age I (c. 1200-1000 BCE). This only allows the limited conclusion that the island was probably home to a local population in the Ramesside period (1292–1069 BCE).

=== Crusaders, Ayyubids, and Mamluks ===
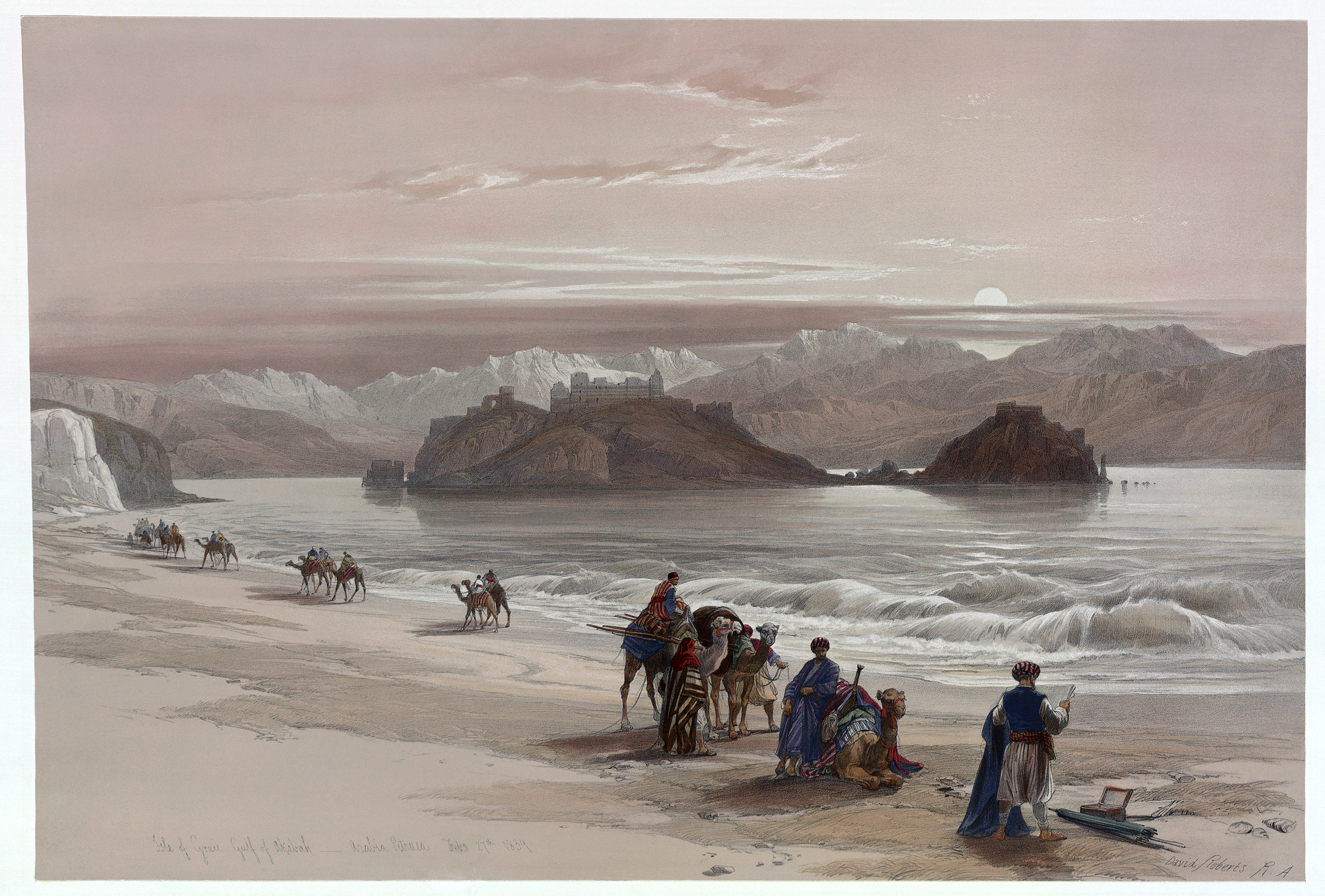
The island in the 19th century

Although the Crusaders reached the head of the Gulf of Aqaba in 1116, they did not establish a permanent presence at Ayla (also spelled Ailah or Wayla; see 'Aqaba) or the nearby island at that time. A Muslim historian describes Ayla as an Arab-populated town still in Muslim hands as late as 1154. According to Adrian Boas, historian and archaeologist of the Crusades, there is no evidence to support the claim that the Crusaders built a castle on Pharaoh's Island in the early 1160s, nor for the recapture of the island by Saladin in December 1170 and his alleged refortification and garrisoning of the fortress. Boas' fellow historian Denys Pringle however, accepts these facts presented in some detail by medieval Muslim sources as plausible, in spite of the fact that no archaeological proof has been brought to light during the 1975-81 digs and the ensuing clearance work. Instead, it seems more likely that it is an entirely Ayyubid fortification from the late 12th and 13th centuries. The 'castle' mentioned in the sources as taken and refortified by the Crusaders might be the casemate-type wall, which surrounds the island at sea level and predates the arrival of the Crusaders by several centuries.

The pseudo-Frankish name Ile de Greye or Isle de Graye (in modern French: île de Graye) by which the island and castle are known in English literature, is a 19th-century invention from Arabic qurayya, "small village". Contemporary chronicles call it Ayla, like the oasis with the nearby town.

In November 1181, Raynald of Châtillon raided the Arab-held Ayla and attempted to set up a naval blockade against the Muslim troops there during the winter of 1182 to 1183. The blockade consisted of only two ships and was not successful. There is no indication that his ships used the island during the blockade.

In 1217, the pilgrim Thietmar passed the island and reported that a castle there was inhabited by Muslims and Christian captives, namely French, English, and Latins–the latter are hard to identify beyond them being Catholics–who all worked as "fishermen of the sultan", without engaging in any farming or military activities.

The Mamluk governor of the city of Aqaba lived in the fortress until some time in the 14th century, around 1320, when the seat of governorship was moved into the city itself.

=== Israel ===
Between 1975 and 1981, during Israeli occupation of the Sinai in the wake of the Six-Day War, Israeli archaeologists explored the island. Israeli archaeologists discovered some 1,500 textile fragments, some originating in India, Iran, and Iraq, as well as hundreds of items of basketry and cordage, carbon-dated to a period between the late 12th and the early 14th century. It is possible to interpret some of the material as evidence for commercial activity, maybe even between Egypt and the Crusader Kingdom of Jerusalem.

=== Egypt ===
After the return of the Sinai, there was clearance and restoration work done by Egypt in the early 1980s. As a result of over-restoration, the fortress has lost some of its authentic medieval look.

Along with the El-Gendi Fortress from the Sinai Peninsula, about halfway between Nekhel and Suez, the fortress on Pharaoh's Island was added onto the UNESCO World Heritage Tentative List on July 28, 2003, due to its purported universal cultural value.

Because of its location near Jordan and Israel, the island and its coral reefs have become a popular sightseeing attraction among tourists based in Taba, Eilat, and Aqaba.

== Bibliography ==
- Pringle, Denys (2005). "The Castles of Ayla (al-'Aqaba) in the Crusader, Ayyubid and Mamluk Periods". In Urbain Vermeulen, J. van Steenbergen (ed.). Egypt and Syria in the Fatimid, Ayyubid and Mamluk Eras (IV). Orientalia Lovaniensia analecta (170). Leuven: Peeters Publishers. pp. 333–354. ISBN 9789042915244.
