= An-Nekhel Fortress =

Fortress in Sinai, Egypt

Coordinates: 29.9°N 33.75°E

The Fortress of an-Nekhel is a Ksar (castle) located in the Nekhel Municipality of the Sinai Peninsula in Egypt. It holds a strategic location at the exact center of the peninsula. Excavations at the site have revealed remains dating from Ancient Egypt. It has historically been an important stop and staging ground for Muslim pilgrims undertaking the Hajj or Umra, holy Muslim pilgrimages.

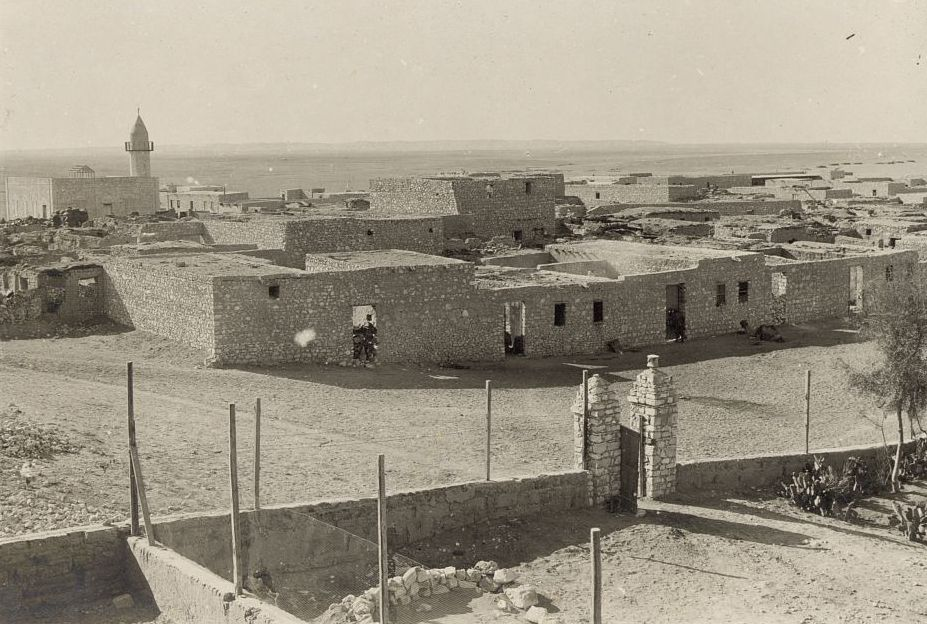
View from fort early 20th century

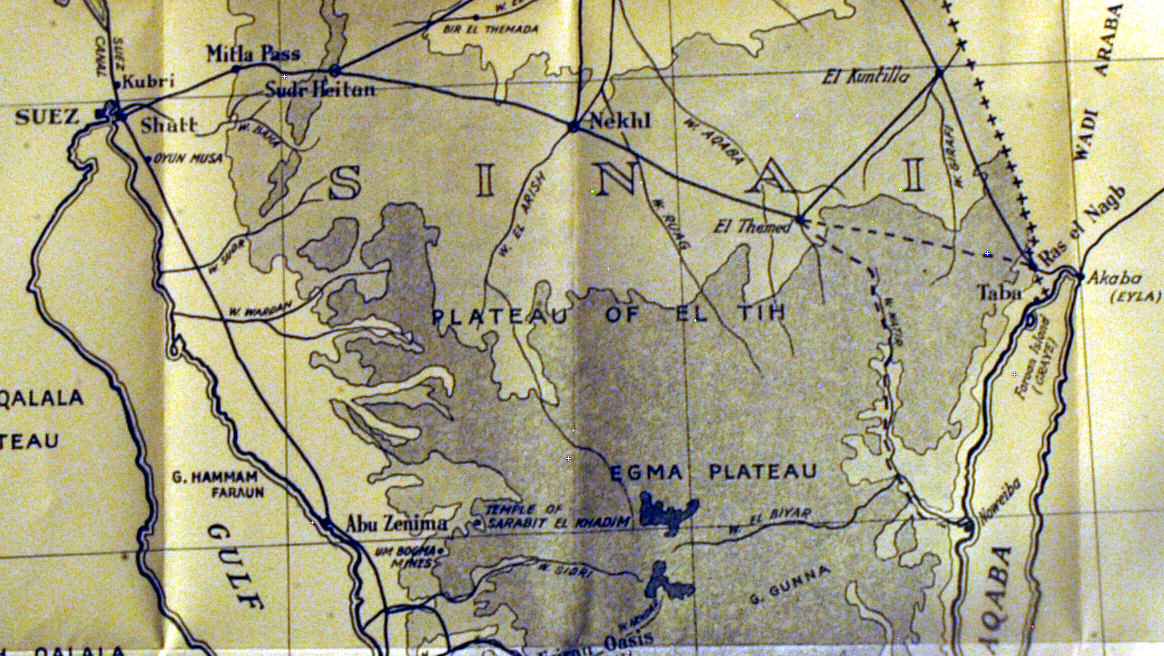
1931 map of Sinai with An-Nekhel in center, 70 miles east of Suez

== History ==
=== Mamluk era ===
A fortress was built on the site by the Circassian Mamluk sultan Al-Ashraf Qansuh al-Ghawri. A group of Christian pilgrims (including Felix Fabri) in 1483 recorded that there was a great well at an-Nekhel which was called the "Well of the Sultan" because during the pilgrimage season the Sultan employed a man with two camels to draw water all day for the pilgrims. The Frenchmen were on their way to Saint Catherine's Monastery and avoided the well due to uncertainty of the reception they might receive.

=== Ottoman era ===
The existing fortress was built by Sultan Selim in the sixteenth century, following his invasion of Egypt in 1517. "Moorish" soldiers were stationed to protect the pilgrims who came from Egypt, Morocco, Algiers and Spain.

=== Mohammed Ali era ===
Johann Ludwig Burckhardt, who visited the site in the first decade of the 19th century, reported a large building with stone walls and no habitations around it. There was a large reservoir for the pilgrims filled from a brackish well. The garrison consisted of about fifty soldiers and the fort was used as a magazine to provision the Egyptian Army in its expeditions against the Wahabis.

In the nineteenth century, when the route was still used by pilgrims, the road was infested with hyenas, dabba, which fed on the dead camels which had fallen by the wayside. If very hungry, packs were known to have attacked solitary travelers. The residents of an-Nekhel would not leave the village at night for fear of attack, and kept dogs to frighten off the scavengers.

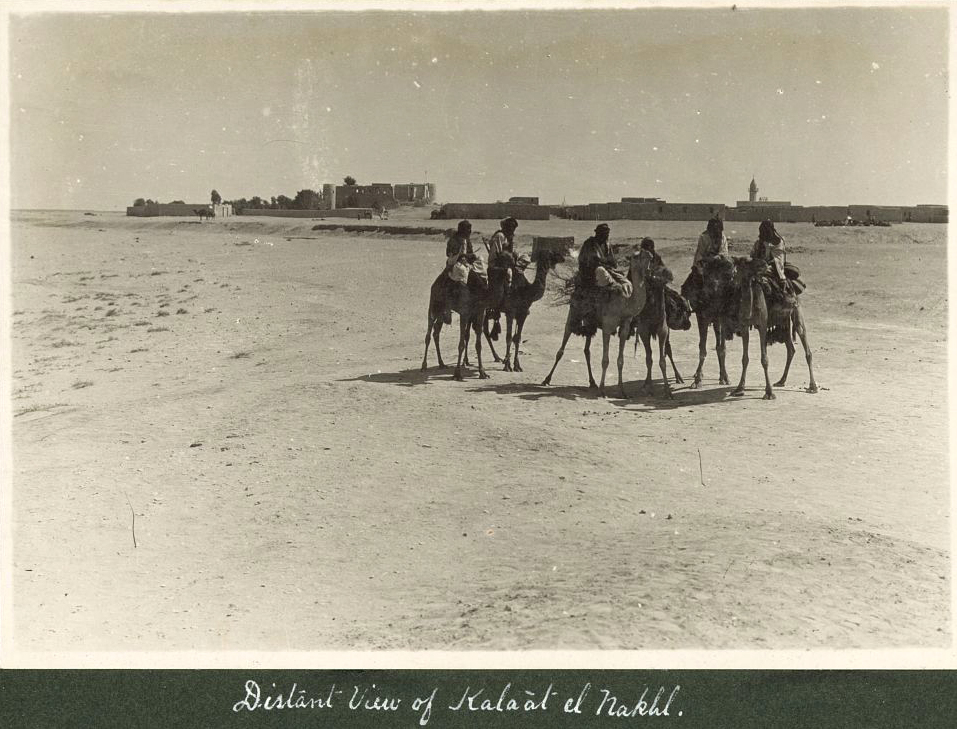
an-Nekhel fortress and village, before 1914.

An explorer at the beginning of the 20th century describes it as a square fort on "absolutely barren ground", built as a place to provide Haj pilgrims with water. It was manned by an officer and ten soldiers; a village around the fort consisted of fifteen to twenty houses inhabited by ex-soldiers and their families. All food was transported from Gaza or Suez, though the villagers cultivated small patches of ground with corn and maize when Wadi el-Arish flooded. This did not occur every year and the Wadi dried up very quickly. Some of the villagers also kept camels. It took the Cairo pilgrims three days to reach an-Nekhel from Suez, and another three days to reach Aqaba.

=== World War I ===
Around 1900 the pilgrimage switched its route to one along the shores of the Gulf of Suez, and an-Nekhel went into decline. In 1915 the Lebanese Druze leader Shakib Arslan arrived at the fortress with 120 Druze volunteers hoping to join the Turkish offensive against the Suez Canal. With the total failure of the attack, the Druze force returned to their homes. According to one source, the fortress was blown up by the Turkish army during the First World War. Two British cavalry columns with three aeroplanes, commanded by Colonel William Grant, approached an-Nekhel on 17 February 1917, to find that it had been abandoned. This was the last British action in their Sinai campaign against the Turks. T. E. Lawrence writes, in chapter 59 (Seven Pillars of Wisdom), of passing near the fort ruins on his way from the capture of Aqaba in July 1917 to report to the Egyptian British command.

A visitor, around 1930, found three policemen, a corporal and one villager, and recommended the big reservoir as worth a visit. Travelling by car, the road to an-Nekhel was slow due to water gullies, several inches deep, every two or three hundred yards, reducing the vehicle's speed to 25 miles per hour.

=== 1956 war ===
During Israel's Sinai Campaign, an-Nekhel was captured by the Israeli Army on the evening of 30 October 1956. Colonel Ariel Sharon, commanding the 202 Paratroop Brigade, had orders to break through to the troops holding positions at the Mitla Pass. Starting from Nitzana, the only seriously defensive position the Brigade faced was at Thamad, which was garrisoned by a company of Sudanese members of the Egyptian Frontier Force. Here, the Israelis suffered their first casualties, 4 killed and six wounded, while the Egyptians lost fifty killed. The Frontier Force company retreated to an-Nekhel, which had another Frontier Force company but no defensive positions or large guns. The attackers had at least two infantry companies, two troops of artillery and two tanks. The fortress fell following air-strikes and an artillery bombardment. The Egyptians retreated towards Suez and Al-Arish, leaving 56 dead.

=== 1967 war ===
In the 1967 War an-Nekhel fell on 7 June to the IDF's 14th Armored Brigade, a force belonging to (now General) Ariel Sharon's 38th Division. This time the retreating Egyptian force consisted of an infantry brigade and an armored brigade detached from the Egyptian 6th Mechanized Division. In the ensuing battle, the Egyptians lost 60 tanks, over 100 guns and 300 other vehicles.

In 1969 Haidar Abdel-Shafi, a lawyer and Palestinian political leader from Gaza, was exiled to an-Nekhel for three months, by the Israelis.

== World Heritage Status ==
This site was added to the UNESCO World Heritage Tentative List on July 28, 2003 in the Cultural category.

It is close to a big military observation post run by international peacekeepers.
