= Nekhel =

Nekhel نِخِل
- City
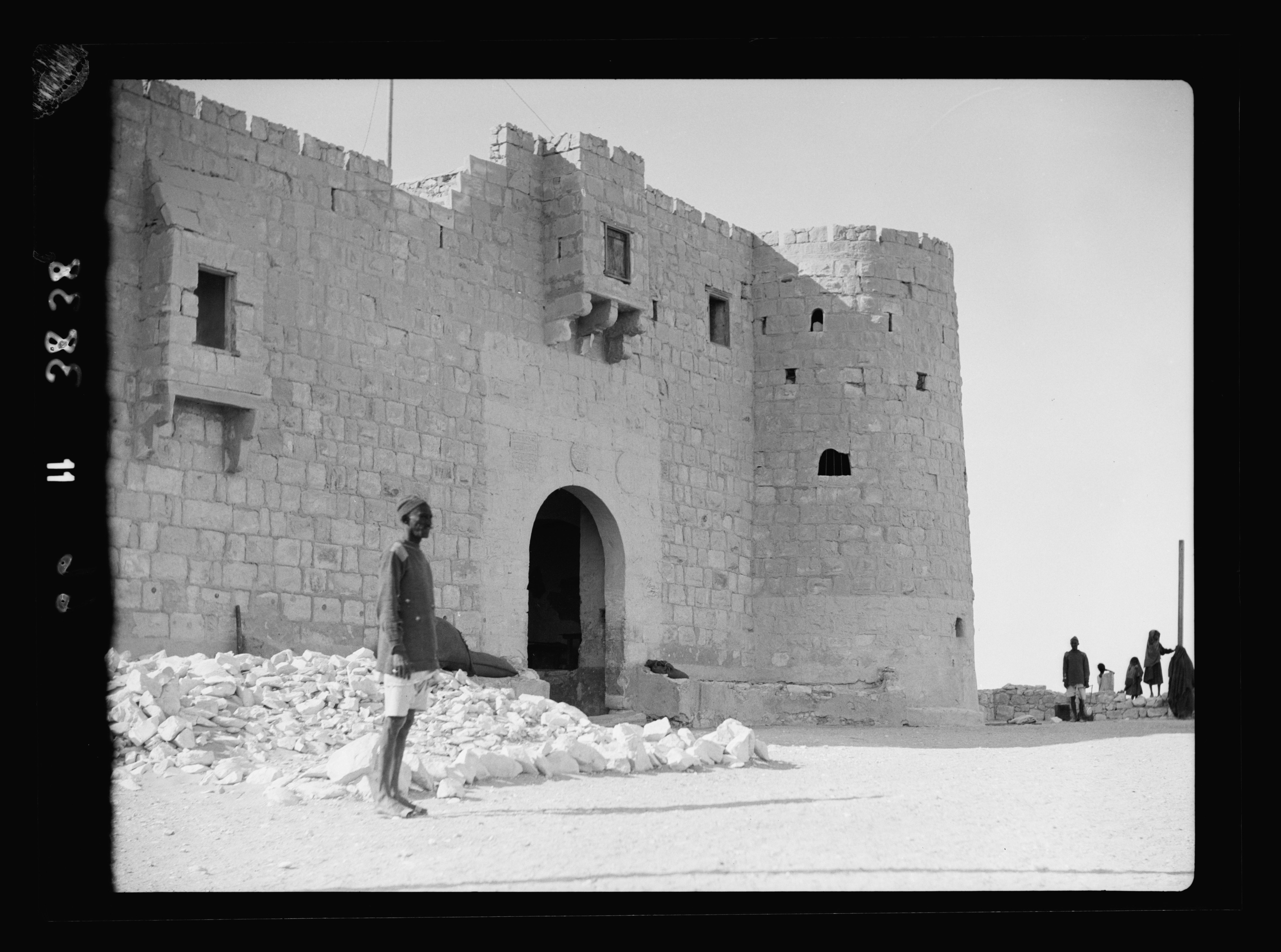
- Nekhel. Ancient pilgrim fortress showing main entrance and corner tower
- Nickname: Heart of Sinai
- Motto: Frozen Heart
- Location in Egypt
- Coordinates: 29°54′N 33°45′E
- Country: Egypt
- Governorate: North Sinai Governorate
- Kism: Nekhel Kism

Government
  - President of Nekhel Municipality and Nekhel City: Hemdan Mahmoud Bekir

Area
  - Total: 4,260 sq mi (11,034 km^{2})
- Elevation: 1,380 ft (420.6 m)

Population (2006-11-21)
  - Total: 11,023
  - Ethnicities: Bedouins and Egyptians.
- Time zone: UTC+2 (EET)
  - Summer (DST): UTC+3 (EEST)

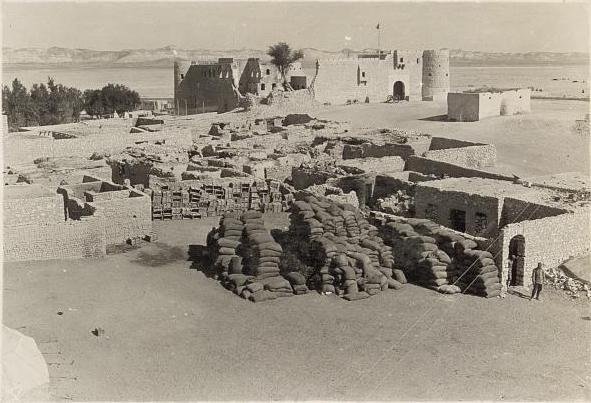
Kalat Nekhel fortress

Nikhel (Arabic: نِخِل; also spelled and pronounced Nikhl) is administratively a city and the capital of the eponymous markaz (county) North Sinai Governorate, Egypt. It is located in the heart of the Sinai Peninsula bordered to its south by the South Sinai Governorate, and is bordered from the west by the Sinai side of the Suez governorate, from the east by the international border of Egypt with Israel, and from the north by Al-Hasana markaz. It is located at the skirts of al-Tih Mountains and foothills at an elevation of 420.6 m (1,380 ft). The coordinates of the city is 29°54'N; 33°45'E. In addition to the town of Nikhel, the markaz comprises 10 other towns and settlements: al-Contilla, Wadi al-Haj, Sadr al-Hitan, al-Tamad, Bir Grid, al-Khafaga, al-Buruk, al-Netila, Ein Twibah and al-Salam.

== History ==
Pharaonic Era

Nekhel was always part of the Egyptian Empire throughout history and it was part of the province of "Du Mafkat" in Ancient Egypt. Nekhel was the ancient capital of the entire Sinai province of Egypt, thanks to its outstanding strategic location at the exact center of the peninsula. In the 16th century BC, the Egyptian Pharaohs built the way of Shur across Sinai to Beersheba and on to Jerusalem. The region provided the Egyptian Empire with minerals, turquoise, gold and copper, and well-preserved ruins of mines and temples are excavated there.

Islamic Era

Being located on the new Hajj Route, Nekhel gained additional significance. In addition to its previous role as a strategic fort capital of Sinai. Hence, the city became a main rest and trade destination for Muslims who passed through the Hajj Route during Hajj season from entire Africa and Egypt towards Mecca for pilgrimage.

Ayubi and Memluki Era

During Islamic rule of Ayubid Caliphate and Mamluks in turn. Several Sultans built forts and castles in Nekhel to defend Egypt from Crusades of Middle East and Red Sea. Nekhel played a significant role as an influential military base for the Egyptian Army during Middle Ages in defeating Crusades and freeing numerous provinces of the Islamic Caliphate.

== Geography and climate ==
Köppen-Geiger climate classification system classifies the town's climate as borderline hot desert (BWh) and cold desert climate (BWk). The mountain ranges of El Tih look at the city from different directions, with several valleys leading from the Mediterranean in the north, the Red Sea and Suez Gulf to the city and the mountains in all directions. The altitude of the city is about 420.6 m (1,380 ft) above the sea level, however nearby El Tih mountains are of higher elevation. Therefore, nearby foothills and mountains result in a cooler temperatures. The summer days are quite hot reaching 40 °C (104 °F), yet with moderate nights. At night, Nekhel is one of the coldest cities in Egypt, along with Saint Catherine and the mountainous provinces of Sinai.

The area is very dry and averages less than 50 mm a year. Making one of the driest regions on earth. Although there are still many permanent water sources in the mountains, the area is continuously drying.

The city also puts a great pressure on the water resources, as ground water in the valley is from the mountains. There is work under way to connect the city to the Nile via a pipeline.

Climate data for Nekhel
| Month | Jan | Feb | Mar | Apr | May | Jun | Jul | Aug | Sep | Oct | Nov | Dec | Year |
|---|---|---|---|---|---|---|---|---|---|---|---|---|---|
| Mean daily maximum °C (°F) | 15.8 (60.4) | 17.3 (63.1) | 20.1 (68.2) | 23.7 (74.7) | 27.8 (82.0) | 30.4 (86.7) | 31.5 (88.7) | 31.9 (89.4) | 29.6 (85.3) | 27.1 (80.8) | 22.0 (71.6) | 17.6 (63.7) | 24.6 (76.2) |
| Daily mean °C (°F) | 10.9 (51.6) | 12.1 (53.8) | 14.6 (58.3) | 17.8 (64.0) | 21.2 (70.2) | 24.0 (75.2) | 25.5 (77.9) | 25.8 (78.4) | 24.0 (75.2) | 21.4 (70.5) | 16.7 (62.1) | 12.6 (54.7) | 18.9 (66.0) |
| Mean daily minimum °C (°F) | 6.0 (42.8) | 6.9 (44.4) | 9.1 (48.4) | 12.0 (53.6) | 14.7 (58.5) | 17.7 (63.9) | 19.5 (67.1) | 19.8 (67.6) | 18.4 (65.1) | 15.8 (60.4) | 11.4 (52.5) | 7.6 (45.7) | 13.2 (55.8) |
| Average precipitation mm (inches) | 5 (0.2) | 8 (0.3) | 7 (0.3) | 3 (0.1) | 2 (0.1) | 0 (0) | 0 (0) | 0 (0) | 0 (0) | 2 (0.1) | 7 (0.3) | 6 (0.2) | 40 (1.6) |
Source: Climate-Data.org, altitude: 405m

== Religion ==
Nekhel was an important destination on the Hajj Route for Muslims from Africa to the cities of Mecca and Medina.

== Culture and Population ==
The traditional people of the area are Bedouins whose culture is very similar to other Bedouin groups. Nekhel Bedouin tribes practice cattle breeding and agriculture which depends on rain and partially common snow. There are also Egyptians who live there and work in governmental sectors and public services.

The techniques used are very similar to the Byzantine methods, partly because of the natural environment. They grow vegetables and fruit in stone walled gardens called bustan or karm, and mastered grafting where a branch of a better yielding low land variety is planted on a more resistant but low yielding mountain variety. Bedouin houses are simple, small stone structures with cane roofing, either incorporated in the garden wall, or standing alone a bit further up from the wadi floor, away from the devastating flash floods that sweep through after occasional heavy rains. Houses are often built next to huge boulders; natural cracks and holes are used as shelves and candle holders. Smaller rock shelters and store rooms are constructed under boulders and in walled up caves and are found everywhere in the mountainous area. You can see ancient leopard traps in many places. A goat was placed in as a bait, and the entrance was slammed closed with a big rock when the leopard entered. There are no more leopards left in Sinai; the last was spotted in the 1980s. In many places you can see big boulders with oval marks engraved on the surface. They are marriage proposal rocks, where a lover drew a line around his foot on the rock face next to his lover's foot print. If the two marks are encircled, their wish was granted and they got married. Wishing Rocks are boulders, usually a short distance from the main paths, with a flat top: if you throw a pebble and it stays on the top, your wish will come true. According to governmental plans, the population of the city is expected to increase. The increasing numbers of Egyptians living there will succeed in accomplishing that developmental national plan. Most of Nekhel's population is formed of Bedouins while the rest are Egyptians.

== Agriculture ==
Agriculture in Nekhel depends mainly on water wells which are found basically in Contilla, Tamd, Bir Grid and Khafga. Additionally, rain and snow help on planting crops such as wheat, barley and corn. Variety of species of plants and crops grow in Nekhel. Mediterranean crops are the main agricultural products. Fruits include apple, almond, pear, apricot, peach, pistachio, dates and grapes. Wild walnut, mulberry and fig are grown in wild at the eastern portions of the city who get higher precipitation. Like other Mediterranean, Egyptian and North African cities, olives are very important in Nekhel, found in many locations. The gardens are usually built in the wadi floors in the main water course, and are encircled by massive stone walls. These walls have to withstand the regular flash floods, retain the soil - thus called retaining wall - and protect the garden from animals. Water wells are either built in the garden or a number of gardens have one but these wells freeze in winter and sometimes in spring and autumn. Today usually generators pump the water, but you can still see many shadoofs. Water is often found at higher elevations, either in natural springs or in wells made at dykes called jidda. The Bedouin built small dams and closed off canyons to make reservoirs. In either case water is channelled to small rock pools called birka, from where it was available for irrigation. Water was flown in narrow conduits made of flat rocks sometimes for kilometers -they are still visible but today gardens rely on plastic pipes (khartoom).

== Nature ==
The city of Nekhel and the entire Central Sinai Region fall within the region of El Tih Plateau. It is a unique high altitude eco-system with many endemic and rare species. Some of the species are endangered, but there are many wild animals, birds, flowers to see. There are many Sinai Agamas, foxes, rock Hyraxes. Rock Hyraxes are frequenting gardens, and there is a wide range of migrating and resident birds from Europe. Also, there is a large number of feral donkeys in the mountains who migrate to the region and lower lying areas (reportedly as far as El Tur) in the winter and go back to graze for the more plentiful summer. Many of them belong to families and are stamped with marks. However, they put a big pressure on the eco-system.

One of the principal goals of the Protectorate is to preserve the bio-diversity of the fragile eco-system, with an emphasis on the Nubian Ibex and the wild medicinal and aromatic plants.

Rain and Snow are the best source of water, thus releasing water at a steady pace, replenishing the underwater catchment areas better. Water from rains flows down fast in the barren mountains, which may cause flash-floods and less water remains.

The views from El Tih foothills are spectacular, and there are many other natural sights in the wadi system. There are springs, creeks, water pools, narrow canyons, steep wadis with huge boulders, amazing rock formations, barren plains with islands of lush vegetation. On the top of the mountains there are many interconnected basins with a unique high altitude ecosystem.

== Places of interest ==
- An-Nakhl Fortress of the Circassian Mamluki sultan Al-Ashraf Qansuh al-Ghawri.
- Fountainheads of Arish Valley which runs from the tops El Tih mountains and foothills.
- Old Hajj Route
- Al-Ashraf Qansuh al-Ghawri Carved Rock
- Metla Corridor
- Tih Mountains

== See also ==
- Egypt
- North Sinai Governorate
