= Outline of recreational dive sites =

Hierarchical outline list of articles about recreational dive sites

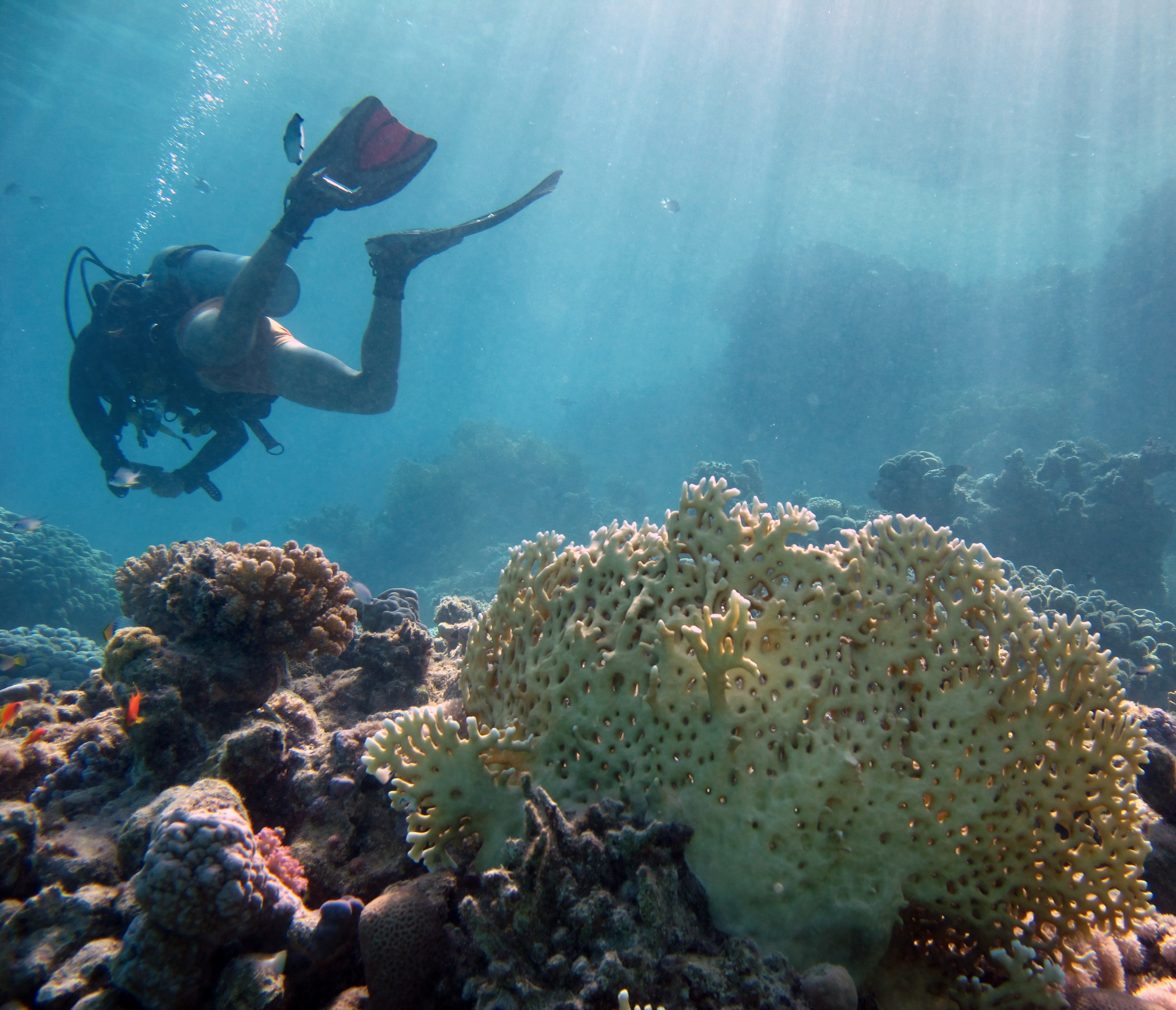
Recreational diver over a coral reef in the Red Sea

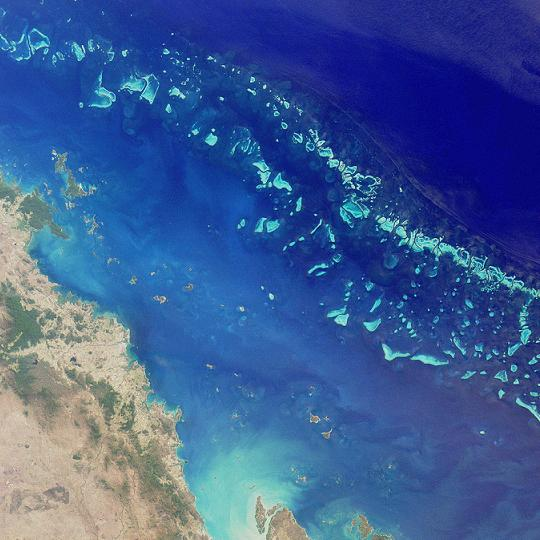
Satellite image of part of the Great Barrier Reef

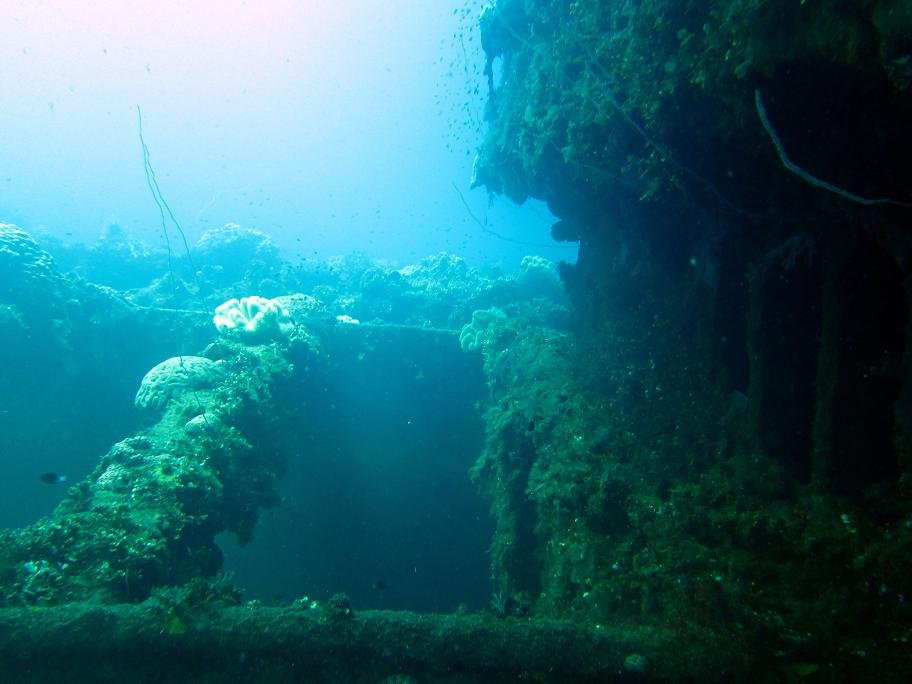
Wreck of the Fujikawa Maru

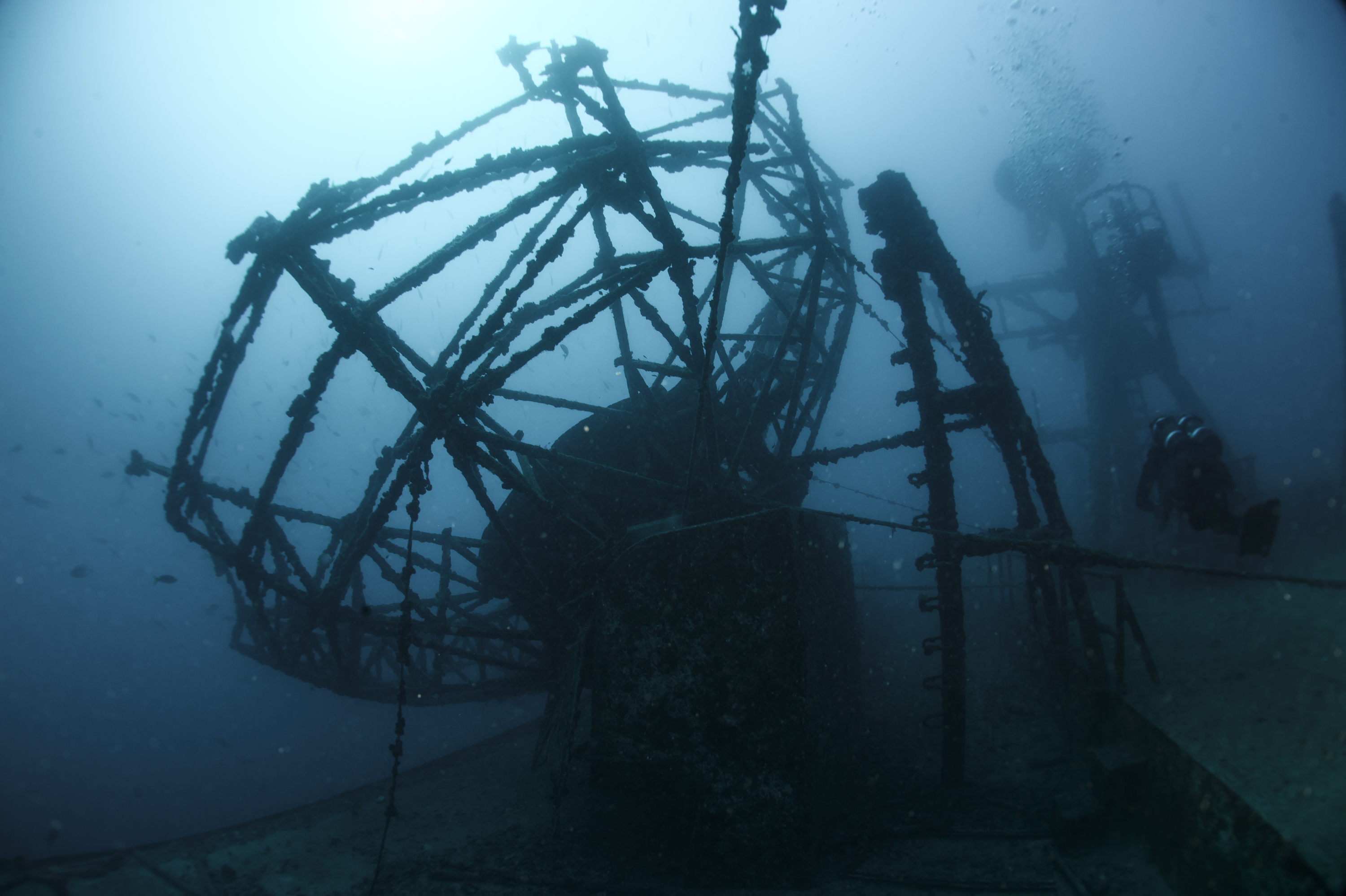
USNS Vandenberg in 2015.

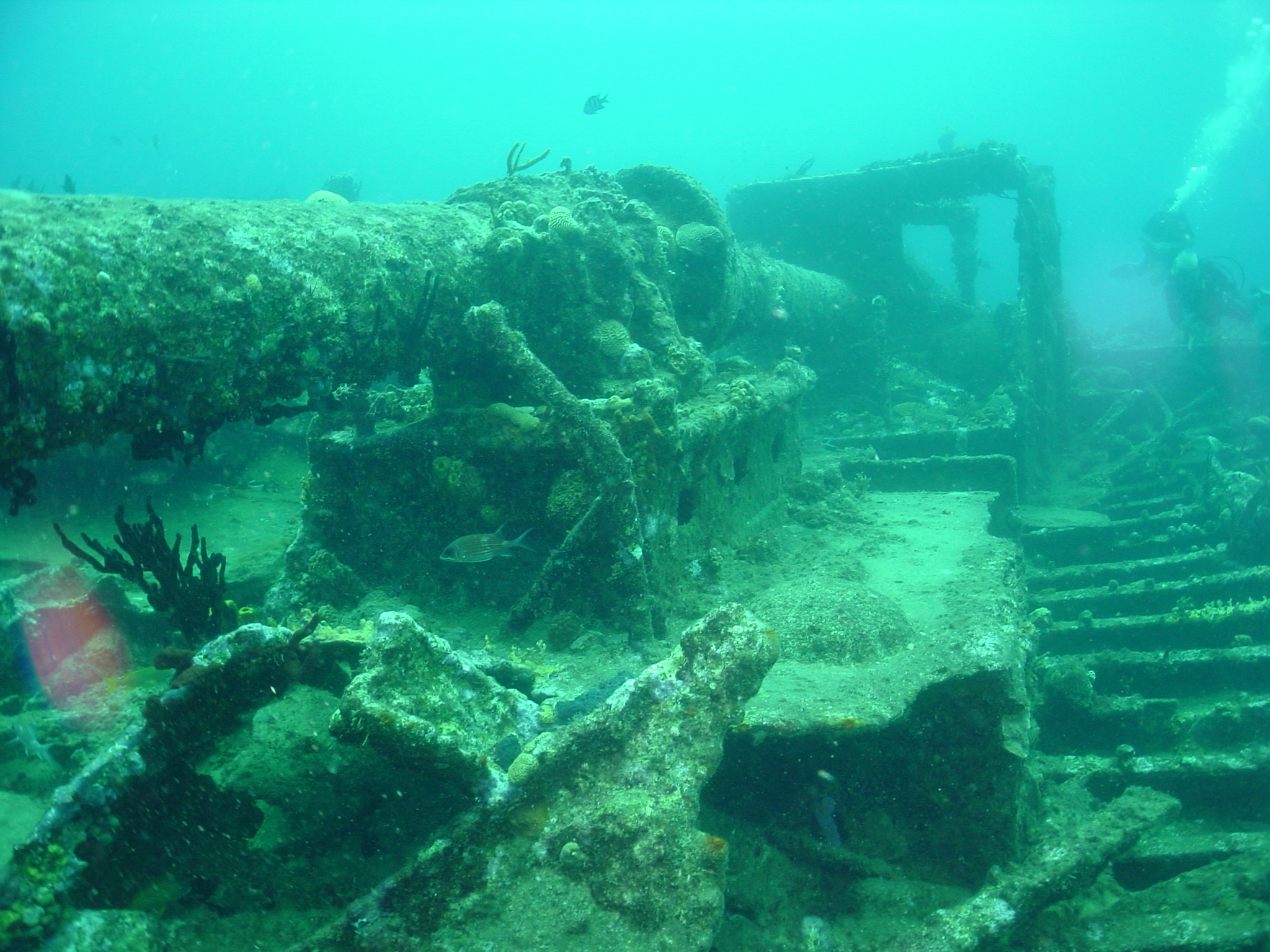
Wreck of the RMS Rhone

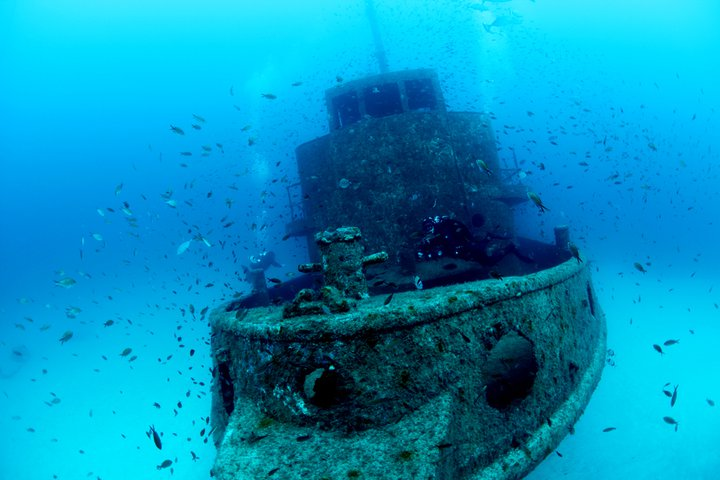
The wreck of the tugboat MV Rozi rests on the seabed at 35 meters

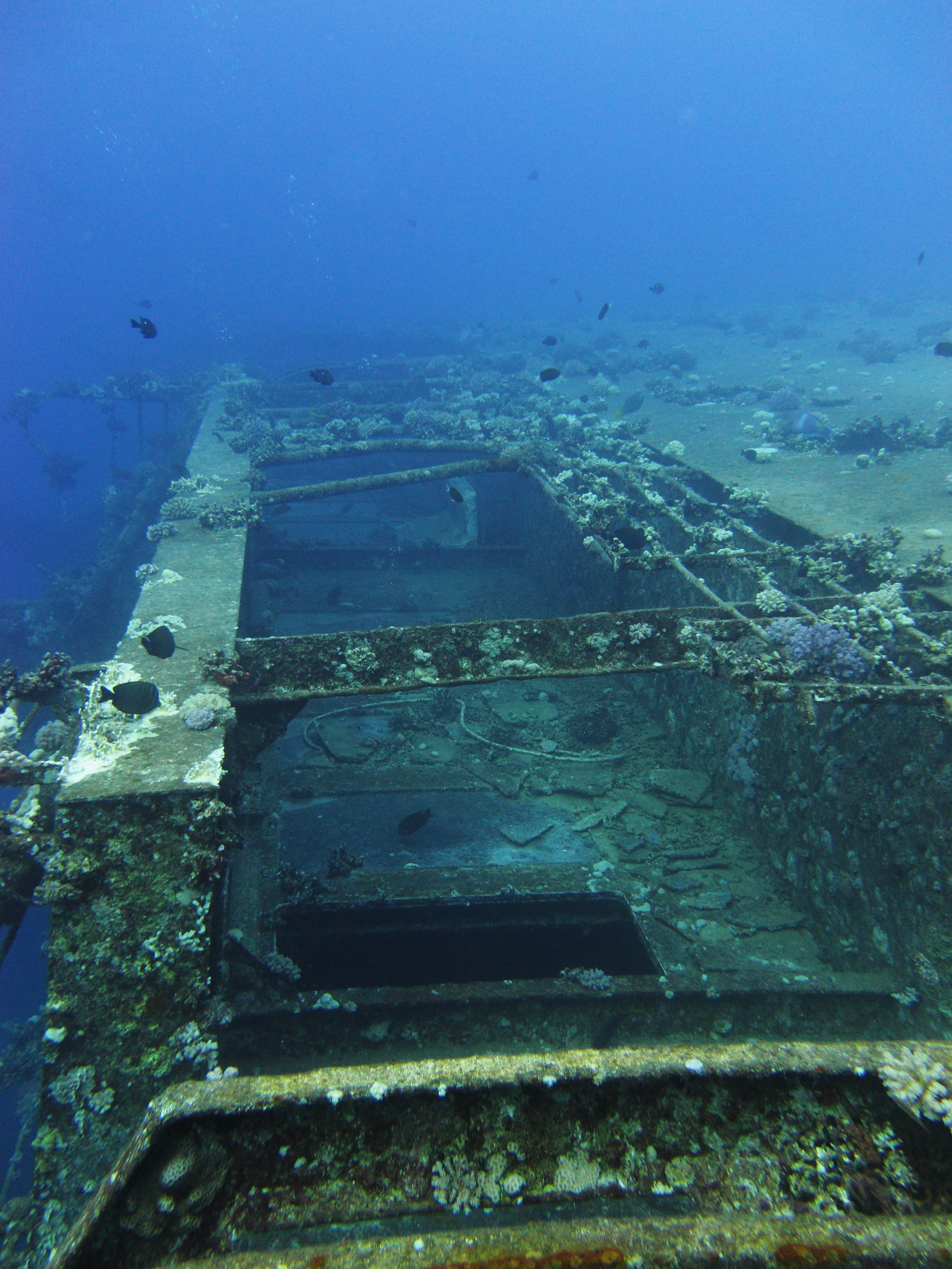
The wreck of Salem Express in 2010, 19 years after she sank.

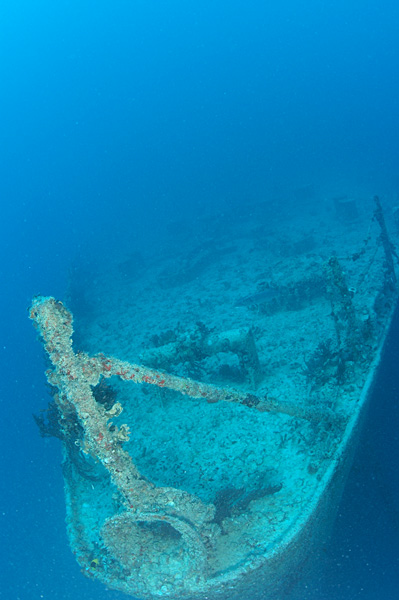
Bow of the Spiegel Grove

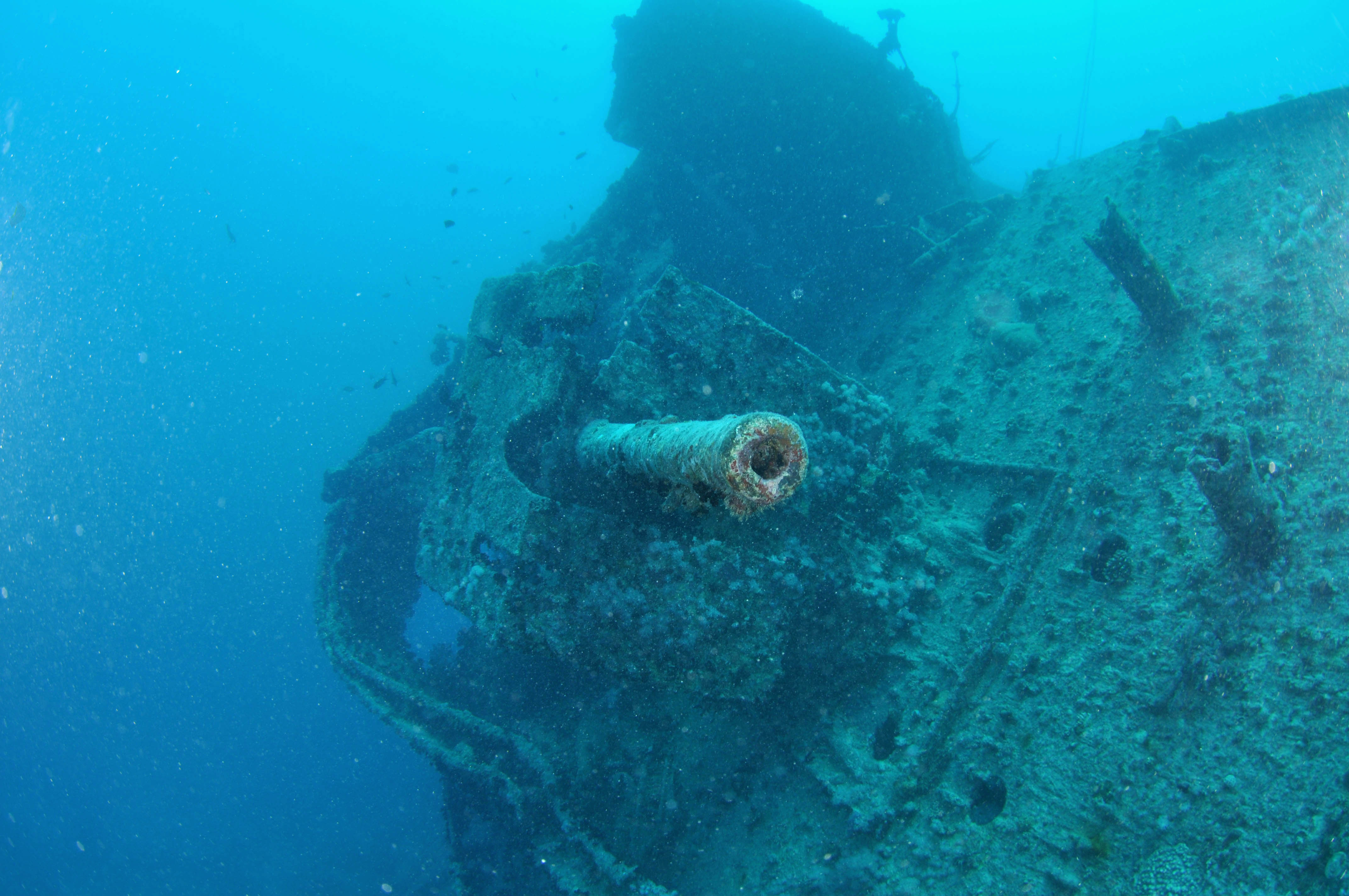
Anti-aircraft gun on the stern of the Thistlegorm

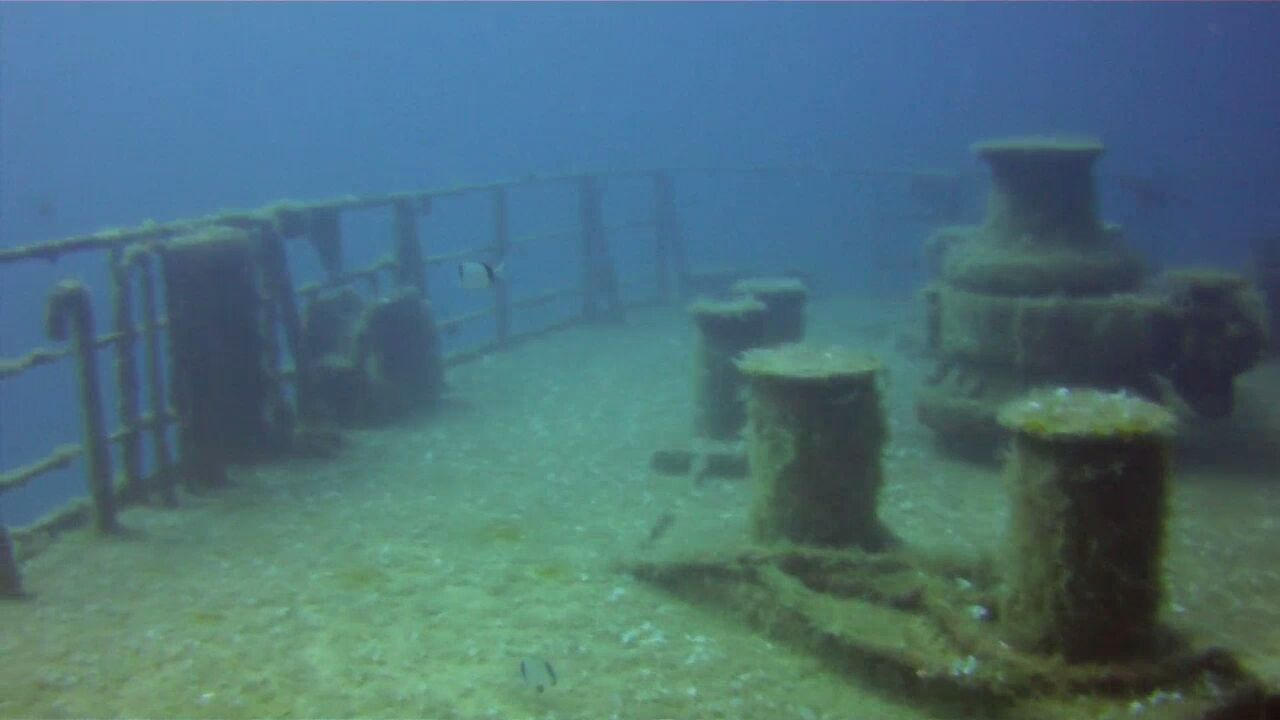
Deck of the Um Al Faroud

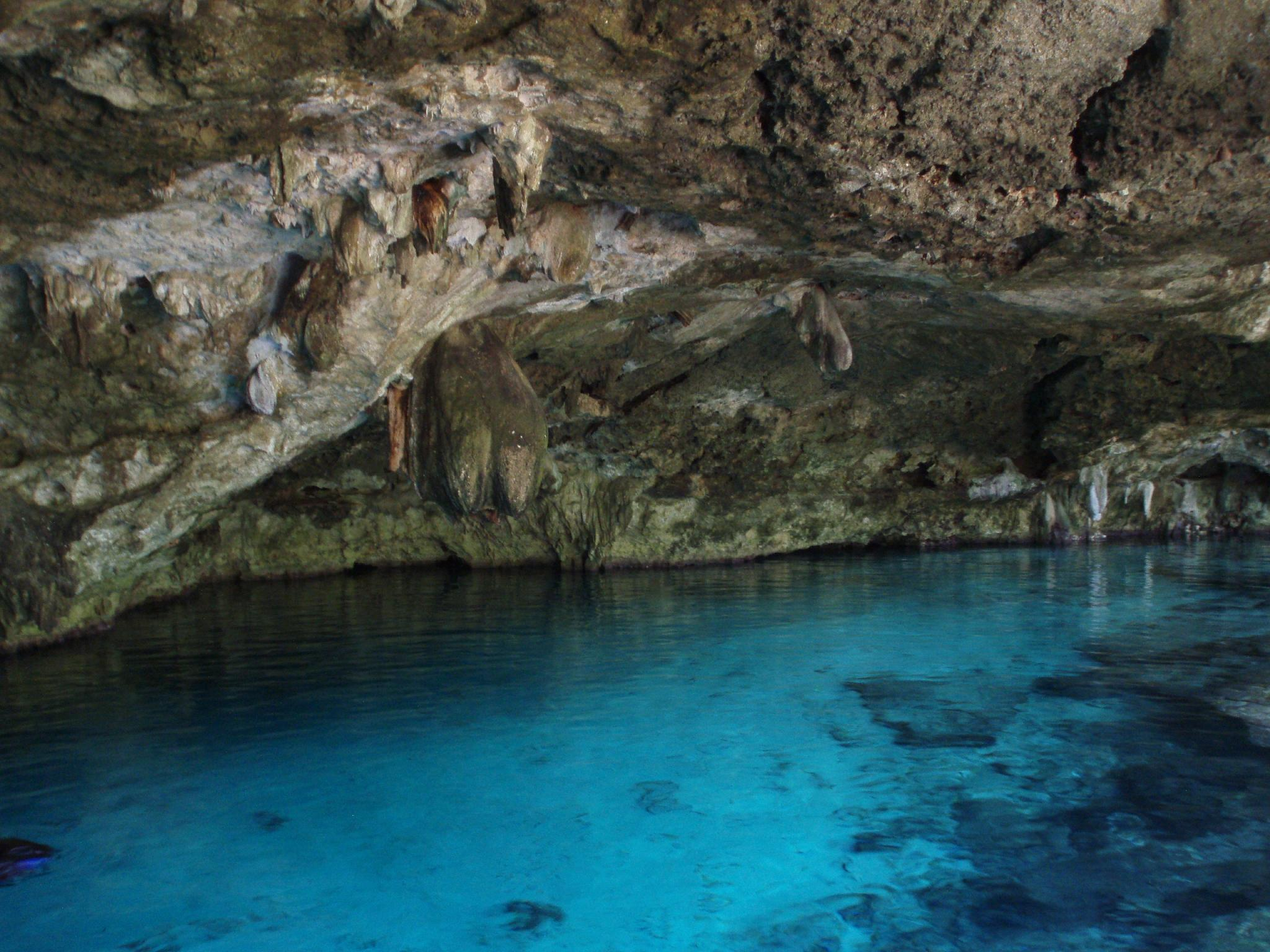
Entrance to the cave system at Dos Ojos

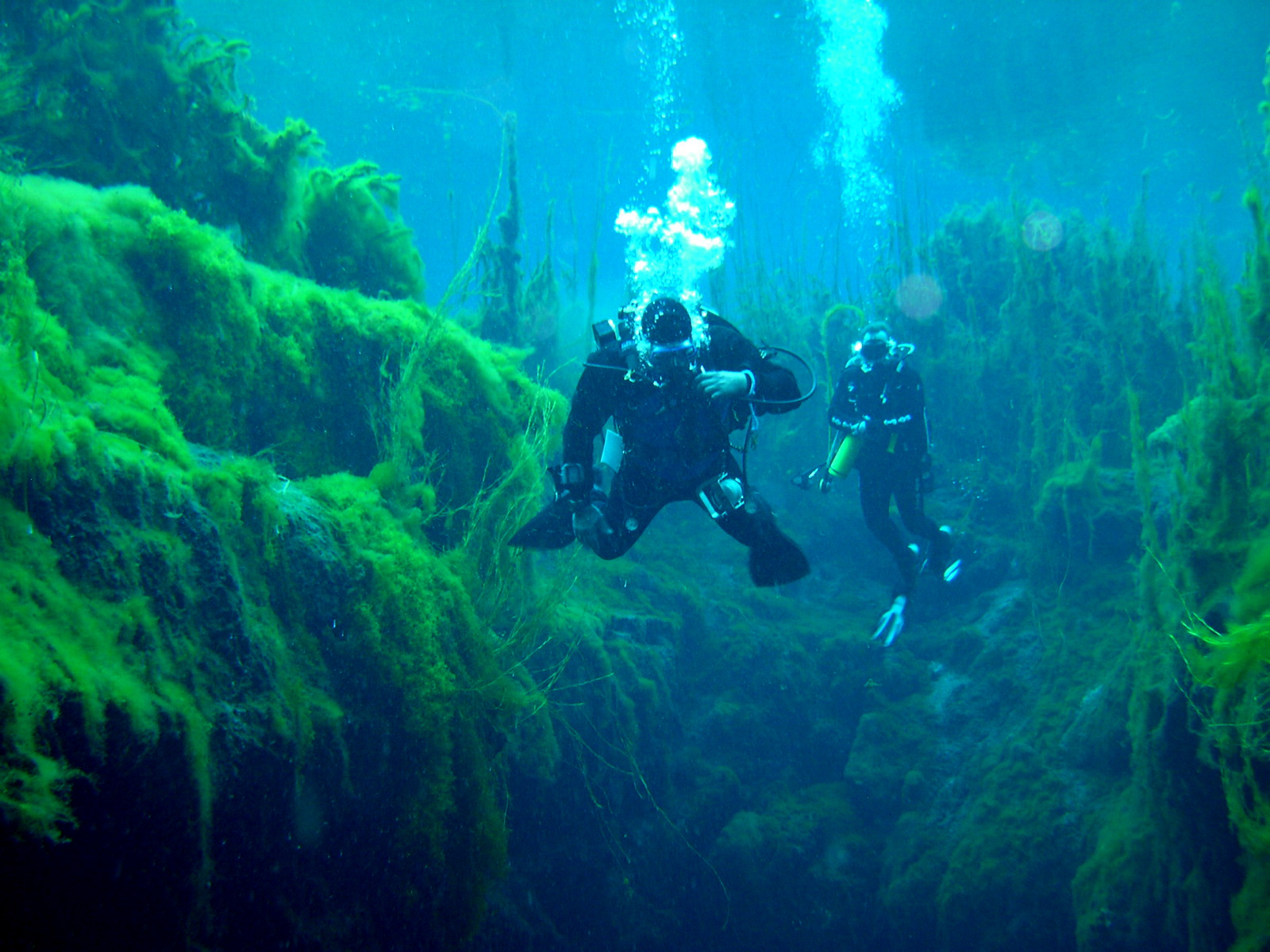
Diving at Piccaninnie ponds

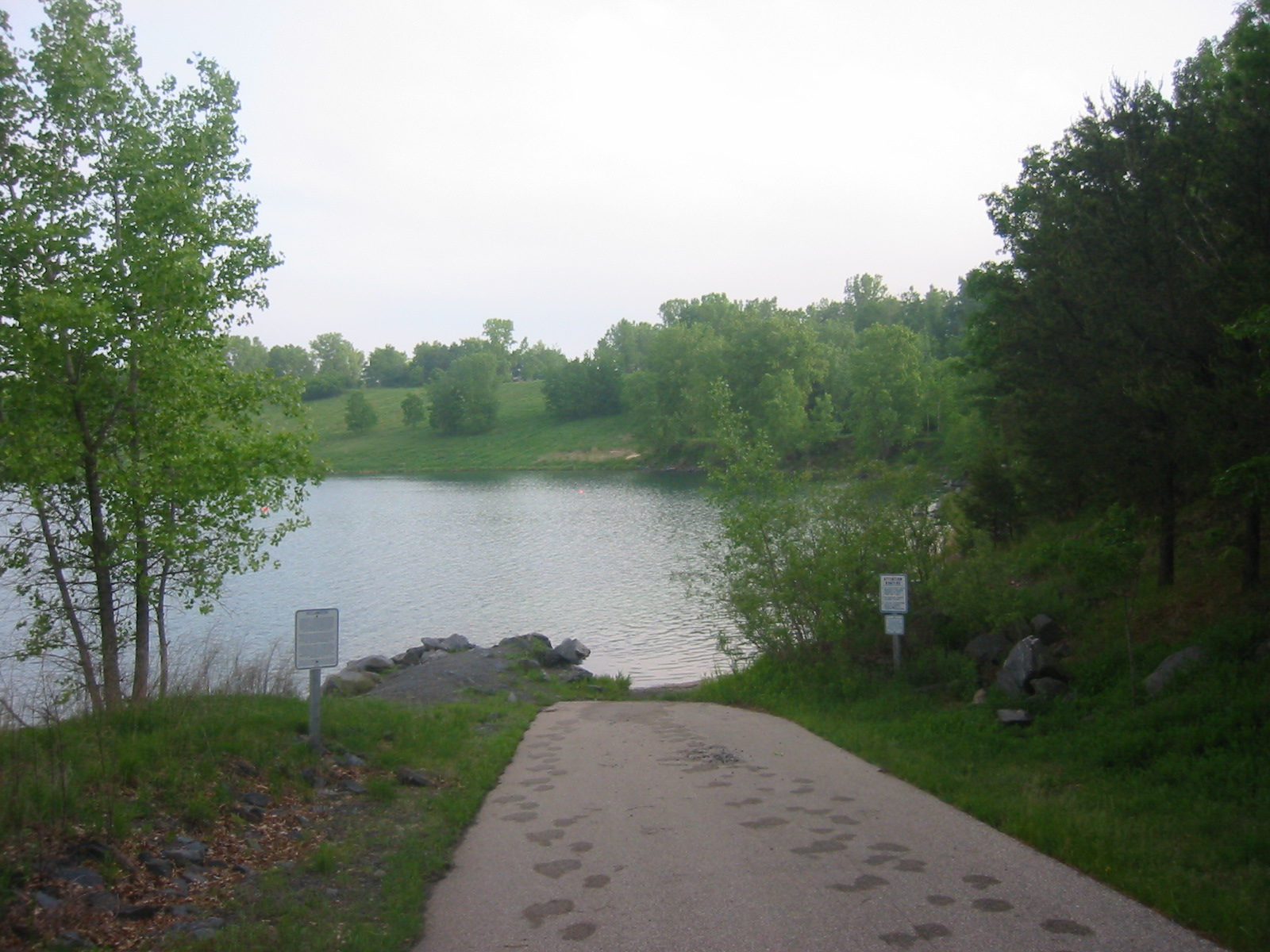
Wazee Lake near Black River Falls, Wisconsin is a former iron mining quarry now used for scuba diving and other uses.

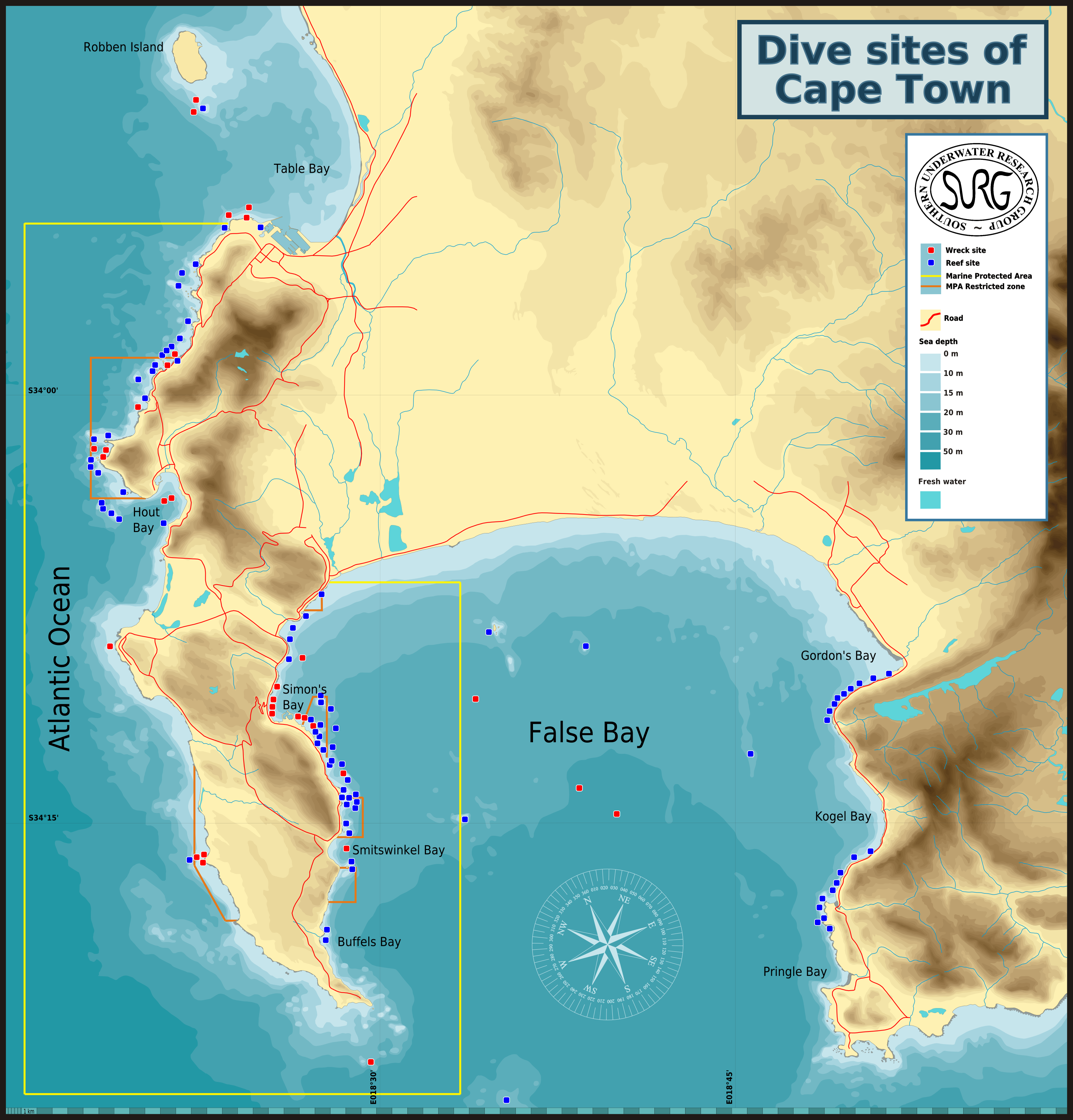
Recreational dive sites of the greater Cape Town region. Most are in the Table Mountain National Par Marine Protected Area

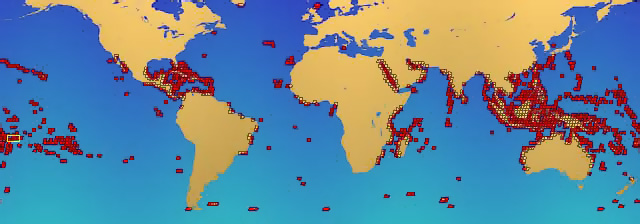
NASA image showing locations of significant coral reefs, which are often sought out by divers for their abundant, diverse life forms.

Recreational dive sites are specific places that recreational scuba divers go to enjoy the underwater environment or for training purposes. They include technical diving sites beyond the range generally accepted for recreational diving. In this context all diving done for recreational purposes is included. Professional diving tends to be done where the job is, and with the exception of diver training and leading groups of recreational divers, does not generally occur at specific sites chosen for their easy access, pleasant conditions or interesting features.

Recreational dive sites may be found in a wide range of bodies of water, and may be popular for various reasons, including accessibility, biodiversity, spectacular topography, historical or cultural interest and artifacts (such as shipwrecks), and water clarity. Tropical waters of high biodiversity and colourful sea life are popular recreational diving tourism destinations. South-east Asia, the Caribbean islands, the Red Sea and the Great Barrier Reef of Australia are regions where the clear, warm, waters, reasonably predictable conditions and colourful and diverse sea life have made recreational diving an economically important tourist industry.

Recreational divers may accept a relatively high level of risk to dive at a site perceived to be of special interest. Wreck diving and cave diving have their adherents, and enthusiasts will endure considerable hardship, risk and expense to visit caves and wrecks where few have been before. Some sites are popular almost exclusively for their convenience for training and practice of skills, such as flooded quarries. They are generally found where more interesting and pleasant diving is not locally available, or may only be accessible when weather or water conditions permit.

While divers may choose to get into the water at any arbitrary place that seems like a good idea at the time, a popular recreational dive site will usually be named, and a geographical position identified and recorded, describing the site with enough accuracy to recognise it, and hopefully, find it again. (Full article...)

== Reef dive sites ==
In the context of recreational diving, a reef may be a coral reef or a bottom of predominantly consolidated inorganic material, like rocky reef, and in the broader sense includes artificial structures and even ships sunk as artificial reefs. No special equipment is needed for most reef dive sites, but sufficient skill in buoyancy and depth control is desirable so that the diver does not harm the ecosystem by clumsy impacts with the bottom or stirring up sediment. Drift diving may be optional or the default where the current is strong.

Reef diving regions are geographical regions of arbitrary size known for including more than one named reef dive site, while a reef dive site is a specific part of a reef known by a name, which recreational divers visit to dive.

Wall diving is a form of reef diving, where The main characteristic of the sites is that the terrain is predominantly near vertical. The height of the wall can vary from a few metres to hundreds of metres. The top of the wall must be within diving depth, but the bottom may be far below or reasonably close to the surface. Many wall dive sites are in close proximity to more gently sloping reefs and unconsolidated sediment bottoms. No special training is required, but good buoyancy control skills are necessary for safety. Wall dive sites vary considerably in depth, and many are suitable for drift diving when a moderate current flows along the wall.

=== Reef diving regions ===
- Aliwal Shoal Marine Protected Area – Marine conservation area at Aliwal Shoal off the coast of KwaZulu-Natal, South Africa
  - Aliwal Shoal – Rocky reef off the coast of KwaZulu-Natal, South Africa
- Al Lith – City in Saudi Arabia
- Amed (Bali) – Group of fishing villages in Karangasem Regency on the north coast of Bali
- Angria Bank – Submerged atoll in Maharashtra, India
- Anilao – Region popular for diving tourism
- Apo Island – Volcanic island in Visayas, Philippines
- Apo Reef – Coral reef in the Philippines
- Arrecifes de Cozumel National Park – Marine protected area in the Cozumel reef system off Mexico
- Bangaram Atoll – Atoll in the Union Territory of Lakshadweep, India
- Bay of Pigs – Bay on the island of Cuba
- Belize Barrier Reef – Series of coral reefs straddling the coast of Belize
- Biscayne National Park – U.S. national park in South Florida
- Bohol Sea – Marginal sea between the Visayas and Mindanao in the Philippines
- Bowie Seamount – Submarine volcano in the northeastern Pacific Ocean
- Broughton Island (New South Wales) – Coastal protected area in New South Wales, Australia
- Bunaken – Island at the northern tip of Sulawesi in Indonesia
  - Bunaken National Park – Marine park in the north of Sulawesi island, Indonesia
- Cagdanao – Island in the province of Palawan in the Philippines
- Calve Island – Uninhabited island on the west coast of Scotland
- Capurganá – Tourist destination of Colombia
- Chesil Cove – Massive curved slope of shingle, at Chesil Beach in Dorset, England
- Ċirkewwa – Harbour in Malta
- Cliff Villa Peninsula – Promontory in Bandabou, Curaçao
- Coron Bay – Bight in Palawan, Philippines
- Coron, Palawan – Municipality in Palawan, Philippines
- Coron Island – Island in the Calamian Islands in Palawan in the Philippines
- Cozumel – Island in Quintana Roo, Mexico
- Dhilba Guuranda–Innes National Park – Protected area in the Yorke Peninsula, South Australia
- Edmonds Underwater Park – Recreational dive site in Seattle, Washington
- El Ikhwa Islands – Two islands in the Egyptian Red Sea
- Eyemouth – Coastal town in Berwickshire Scotland
- False Bay – Bay of the Atlantic Ocean at South Africa
- Farne Islands – Island group off Northumberland, England
- Għar Qawqla – Limestone formation off Marsalforn on the island of Gozo in Malta
- Gili Islands – Three small islands off Lombok, Indonesia
- Great Barrier Reef – Coral reef system in Queensland, Australia
- Great Southern Reef – Australian reef system
- Guadalupe Island Biosphere Reserve – Natural reserve in Mexico
- Hand Deeps – Area of the English Channel off the south coast of Cornwall
- Haql – City and Governorate in Tabuk Province, Saudi Arabia
- Hol Chan Marine Reserve – Marine reserve off the coast of Belize
- Hurghada – Capital of the Red Sea Egyptian Governorate
- iSimangaliso Marine Protected Area – Marine conservation area in northern kwaZulu-Natal in South Africa
  - Sodwana Bay – Bay of the Indian Ocean on the northern KwaZulu-Natal coast of South Africa
- John Pennekamp Coral Reef State Park – State park at Key Largo, Florida, USA
- Kadmat Island – Coral island of the Lakshadweep archipelago in India
- Ko Tao – Island subdistrict in Surat Thani, Thailand
- Lawrence Rocks – Rocky islets in Victoria, Australia
- Lighthouse Reef – Atoll off the coast of Belize
- Mabini, Batangas – Municipality in Batangas, Philippines
- Mafia Island – Island of the Mafia Archipelago in Pwani Region, Tanzania
- Malapascua – Island in the Philippines
- Makna, Saudi Arabia – Town in Tabuk province, Saudi Arabia
- The Manacles – Set of treacherous rocks off The Lizard peninsula in Cornwall
- Mantanani Islands – Group of three islands off the north-west coast of Sabah, Malaysia
- Marsa Alam – Town in the Red Sea Governorate, Egypt
- Martin's Haven – Bay in Pembrokeshire, Wales, UK,
- Mergui Archipelago – Archipelago in far southern Myanmar
- Molasses Reef – Coral reef located within the Florida Keys National Marine Sanctuary
- Molokini – Islet in Maui County, Hawaii
- Neptune Islands – Two groups of islands in South Australia
- Nusa Lembongan – Island in Indonesia
- Osprey Reef – Submerged atoll northeast of Queensland, Australia
- Panglao, Bohol – Municipality in Bohol, Philippines
- Pedra da Risca do Meio Marine State Park – State park in Ceará, Brazil
- Pescador Island – Island in Cebu, Philippines
- Petit Saint Vincent – Island in St. Vincent and the Grenadines
- Piccaninnie Ponds Conservation Park – Protected area near Mount Gambier in South Australia
- Poor Knights Islands – Group of islands and marine reserve off the east coast of New Zealand's North Island
- Porteau Cove Provincial Park – Place in British Columbia, Canada
- Puerto Galera – Municipality in Oriental Mindoro, Philippines
- Punta Cana – Resort town in La Altagracia Province, Dominican Republic
- Ras Muhammad National Park – Egyptian national park in South Sinai
- Rondo Island – Northernmost island in Indonesia
- Rosario Islands – Caribbean archipelago off the coast of Colombia
- Rottnest Island – Island off the coast of Western Australia
- Safaga – City on the Red Sea coast of Egypt
- Samae San Island - Deepest technical dive sites in the Gulf of Thailand
- San Andrés (island) – Colombian island in the Caribbean
- San Pedro Nolasco Island – Mexican island in the Gulf of California
- Seven Stones Reef – Rocky reef offshore of Land's End, Cornwall
- Shaʽb Abu Nuħas – Coral reef in the Red Sea
- Shadwan Island – Egyptian island in the Red Sea
- Similan Islands – Marine protected area in Phang Nga Province, southern Thailand
- Sipadan – Oceanic island in Malaysia
- Socorro Island – Volcanic island off the west coast of Mexico
- Soma Bay – Coastal resort in the Red Sea Governorate, Egypt
- Sound of Mull – Sound between the Inner Hebridean island of Mull and mainland Scotland
- St. Crispin's Reef – Part of the Great Barrier Reef, Queensland, Australia
- Subic Bay – Bay on the west coast of the island of Luzon, Philippines
- Taba, Egypt – Town in South Sinai, Egypt
- Table Mountain National Park Marine Protected Area – Marine conservation area around the Cape Peninsula in South Africa
- Taganga – Fishing village and corregimiento in Magdalena, Colombia
- Tayrona National Natural Park – Protected area in Colombia's north Caribbean region
- Trearddur – Village and community in Anglesey, Wales
- Tayyib Al-Ism – Town in Tabuk, north-western Saudi Arabia
- Tsitsikamma Marine Protected Area – Marine conservation area on the south coast of South Africa
- Tubbataha Reef – Protected area in the middle of the Sulu Sea
- Utila – Smallest of Islas de la Bahía, Honduras
- Wakatobi Regency – Regency in Southeast Sulawesi, Indonesia
- Weh Island – Island in Aceh, Indonesia
- Whittle Rock reef – Granite offshore reef area in False Bay, South Africa

=== Reef dive sites ===
- Artificial reef – Human-made underwater structure that functions as a reef
  - Edithburgh jetty – Coastal town in South Australia
  - Gibraltar Artificial Reef – Artificial reef project off Gibraltar
  - Merkanti Reef – Artificial reef at St. Julian's, Malta
  - Osborne Reef – Artificial reef off Fort Lauderdale, Florida, US
  - Shark River Reef – Artificial reef off New Jersey
  - Swanage Pier – Pier in Swanage, Dorset, United Kingdom
  - Underwater sculpture – Sculpture made for underwater display
    - Cancún Underwater Museum – Underwater display of sculpture in Cancún, Mexico
    - Christ of the Abyss – Submerged statue of Jesus Christ
    - Circle of Heroes – Underwater military memorial in Florida
    - Kristu tal-Baħħara – Christ of the Mariners, underwater statue off Malta
    - Molinere Underwater Sculpture Park – Collection of underwater contemporary art off Grenada in the Caribbean
- Azure Window – Former natural arch in Gozo, Malta
- Begg Rock – Small island in California, US
- Blue Corner – Dive site of Palau
- Bottle Island – One of the Summer Isles in Loch Broom, Scotland
- Cod Hole – Dive site in Queensland, Australia
- Dahab
- Daedalus Reef – Reef in the Egyptian Red Sea
- Devil's Throat at Punta Sur – Underwater cave near Cozumel, Mexico
- Edmonds Underwater Park – Recreational dive site in Seattle, Washington
- El Ikhwa Islands – Two islands in the Egyptian Red Sea
- Elphinstone Reef – Small reef in the Egyptian Red Sea
- Eyemouth – Coastal town in Berwickshire Scotland
- Fanadir – Recreational dive site in the Red Sea
- Falls of Lora – Tidal race at the mouth of Loch Etive in Argyll and Bute, Scotland
- Fort Bovisand – Coastal fort in Devon, England
- Fowey Rocks Light – Lighthouse on Key Biscayne, Florida, United States
- Frederiksted Pier – Cruise ship pier in Saint Croix, U.S. Virgin Islands
- French Reef – Coral reef in the Florida Keys, US
- Gamul Kebir – Recreational dive site of Egypt in the Red Sea
- German Channel – Channel dug through reef Palau
- Hillsea Point Rock – Group of pinnacles in the English Channel off Devon
- Hoi Ha Wan – Bay in a marine park in Hong Kong
- Inland Sea, Gozo – Seawater lagoon on Gozo, Malta
- Jewfish Point – Geographical landmark, California, U.S.
- Kennack Sands – Beach in Cornwall, England
- Loch Fyne – Sea inlet on west coast of Scotland
- The Manacles – Set of treacherous rocks off The Lizard peninsula in Cornwall
- Magic Point – Coastal headland in Sydney, New South Wales, Australia
- Molasses Reef – Coral reef located within the Florida Keys National Marine Sanctuary
- Molokini – Islet in Maui County, Hawaii
- Octopus Hole Conservation Area – Designated conservation area on Washington's Hood Canal
- Palancar Reef – Coral reef off Cozumel, Mexico in the Caribbean sea
- Pickles Reef – Coral reef in the Florida Keys, US
- Piti Bomb Holes Marine Preserve – Marine protected area in Guam
- Pope's Eye – Uncompleted foundation for an island fort at Port Philip, Victoria, Australia
- Port Hughes jetty – Recreational dive site in South Australia
- Port Noarlunga jetty – Recreational dive site in South Australia
- Port Noarlunga Reef – Recreational dive site in South Australia
- Portsea Hole – Seafloor depression in Port Phillip, Victoria, Australia
- Rapid Bay jetty – Recreational dive site in South Australia
- Ricks Spring – Karst spring in Utah, USA
- San Mateo Rocks – Uninhabited California coastal islands
- Seacrest Cove 2 – Recreational dive site in West Seattle, Washington
- Second Valley – Coastal town in South Australia
- South Channel Fort – Island in southern Port Phillip, Victoria, Australia
- St Abbs – Village in Berwickshire, Scotland
- Sund Rock – Conservation area on Hood Canal, Washington, USA
- Stingray City, Grand Cayman – Sandbars in the North Sound of Grand Cayman, Cayman Islands
- Tung Ping Chau – Island in Hong Kong
- White Point, California – Geographic landmark
- Whittle Rock – Granite reef in False Bay, South Africa
- Whyalla – City in South Australia
- Wolf Rock – Marine pinnacles in Queensland, Australia

=== Wall diving regions ===
Specific regions known for wall dive sites include:

- Cayman Islands – British Overseas Territory in the Caribbean
- Palau – Country in the Western Pacific
- Indonesia – Country in Southeast Asia and Oceania
- Papua New Guinea – Country in Oceania
- Turks and Caicos Islands – British Overseas Territory in the North Atlantic Ocean
- The Bahamas – Country north of the Caribbean
- Honduras – Country in Central America
- Belize – Country in Central America
- Hawaii – U.S. state
- Red Sea – Arm of the Indian Ocean between Asia and Africa
- Fiji – Country in Oceania
- Puget Sound – Sound in Washington, United States
- Monterey Bay – Large salt water bay in California, United States
- Catalina Island – Channel Island off the coast of California

=== Wall dive sites ===
- Blue Hole (Red Sea) – Submarine sinkhole north of Dahab, Egypt
- Great White Wall - Fiji
- Rainbow Reef - Fiji
- Half Moon Caye Wall - Lighthouse Atoll, Belize
- Bloody Bay - Grand Cayman, Cayman Islands
- Ghost Mountain - Grand Cayman, Cayman Islands
- East Chute/Cayman Mariner - Cayman Brac, Cayman Islands
- Haleiwa Trench - Oahu, Hawaii
- Black Rock - Maui, Hawaii
- Molokini - Maui, Hawaii
- Islas Marietas - Puerto Vallarta, Mexico
- El Chato - Ixtapa-Zihuatanejo, Mexico

== Cave dive sites ==
Many cave dive sites are fresh water, but there are some that are sea water and a few that are partly fresh and partly sea water, and these may have a distinct halocline.

Sea cave – Cave formed by the wave action of the sea and located along present or former coastlines

- Blue Grotto (Malta) – Sea caverns in Malta
- Devil's Throat at Punta Sur – Underwater cave near Cozumel, Mexico
- Nereo Cave – Sea cave in Sardinia, Italy
- Inland Sea, Gozo – Seawater lagoon on Gozo, Malta

Caves with exclusively or mainly fresh water

- Amphitrite cave, Greece.
- Blackwater resurgence, Ireland.
- Blauhöhle – Flooded cave system in Southern Germany
- Blue Hole (New Mexico) – Sinkhole used for scubadiving in New Mexico, United States
- Boesmansgat – Sinkhole and dive site in South Africa
- Buford Springs – Cave diving site in Florida
- Cenote – Natural pit or sinkhole that exposes groundwater underneaths
  - Dzibilchaltun – Maya archaeological site with cenote in Yucatan, Mexico
  - Sistema Dos Ojos – Flooded cave system in the Yucatan Peninsula, Mexico
  - Sistema Nohoch Nah Chich – Flooded cave system in Mexico
  - Sistema Ox Bel Ha – Flooded cave system in Quintana Roo, Mexico
  - Sistema Sac Actun – Flooded cave system in the Yucatan Peninsula, Mexico
- Chinhoyi Caves – Group of caves in north central Zimbabwe
- Cocklebiddy cave – Large flooded cave in Western Australia
- Devil's Cave system, Florida, US.
- Eagle's Nest (sinkhole) – Cave diving site in Florida
- Engelbrecht Cave – Cave system in South Australia
- Fossil Cave – Flooded cave in the Limestone Coast area of South Australia
- Hranice Abyss – Flooded sinkhole near the town of Hranice, Czech Republic
- Jackson Blue, Florida, US.
- Jordbrugrotta – Cave system in Norway
- Madison Blue Springs, Florida, US.
- Millpond cave
- Molnár János Cave – Water-filled cave in Budapest, Hungary
- Ojamo mine
- Peacock Springs – Karst flooded cave and spring system in Florida,
- Pearse Resurgence, also known as Nettlebed cave – Source of the Pearse Stream on Mt. Arthur, New Zealand South Island
- Piccaninnie Ponds – Protected area near Mount Gambier in South Australia
- Silfra – Water-filled rift in Iceland between the North American and Eurasian tectonic plates
- Uamh an Claonaite – Cave in Assynt, Highlands, Scotland
- Utopia Cave, Sardinia
- Vortex Spring – Freshwater spring and recreational dive site in Florida
- Wakulla Springs – Spring and cave in the Floridan Aquifer under the Woodville Karst Plain of north Florida
- Wondergat – Sinkhole dive site near Lichtenburg, South Africa
- Wookey Hole Caves – Series of limestone caverns in Somerset, EnglandEngland, Fresh-->
- Zacatón – Water-filled sinkhole in Mexico

=== Blue holes ===
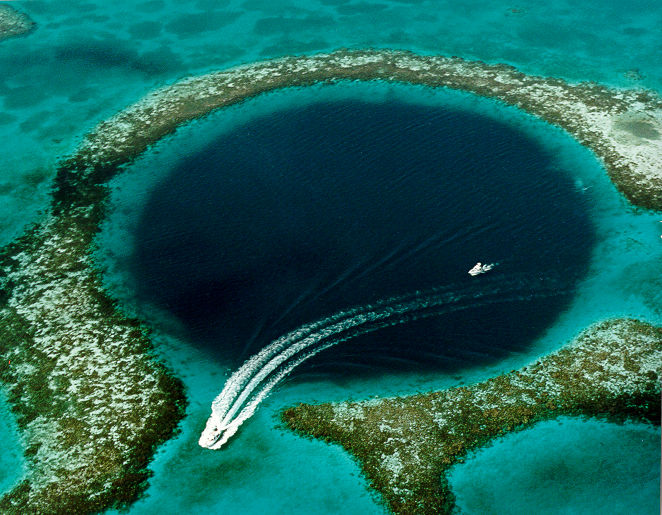
The Great Blue Hole, located near Ambergris Caye, Belize

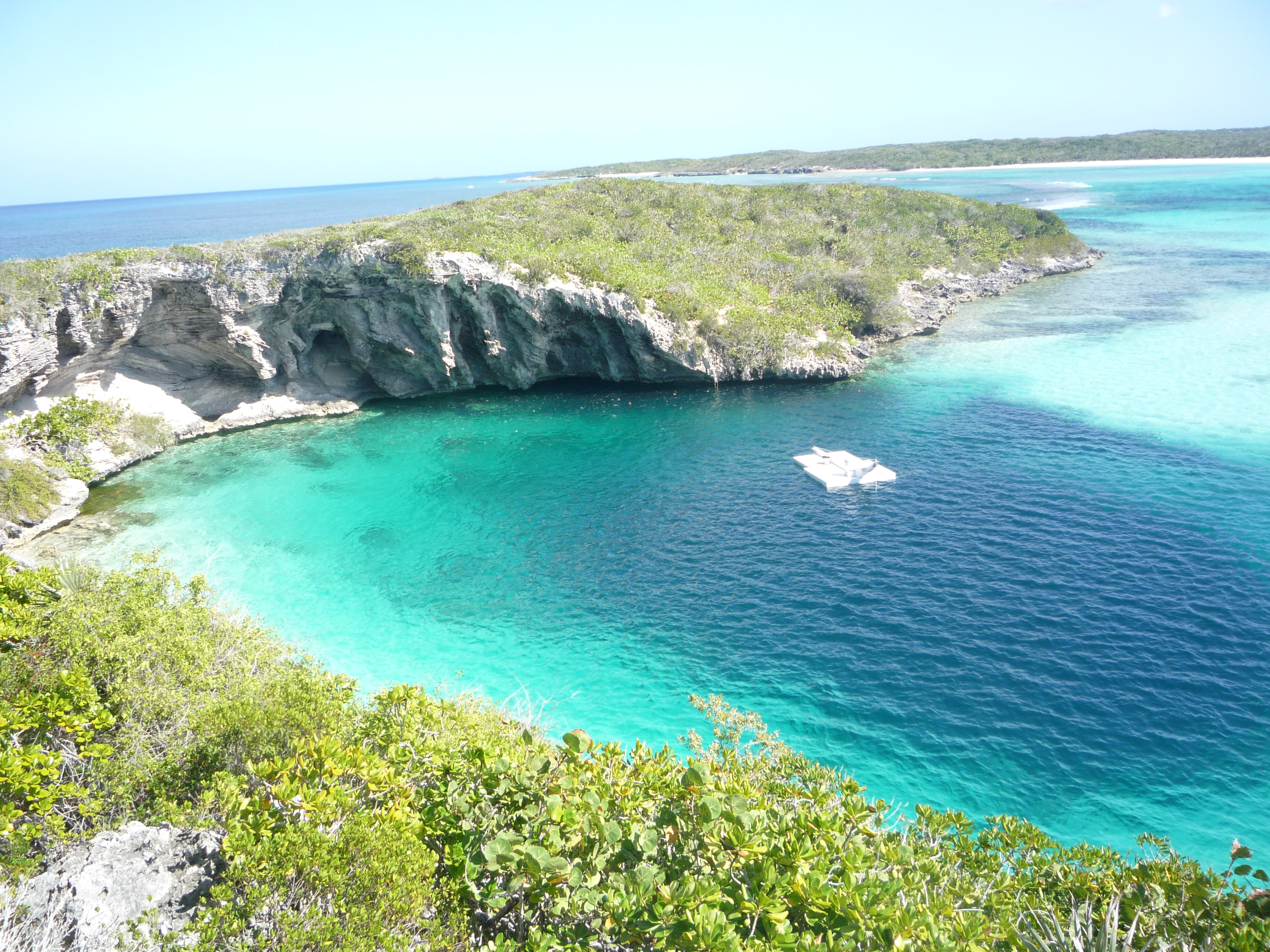
Dean's Blue Hole, Long Island, Bahamas

Blue hole – Marine cavern or sinkhole, open to the surface, in carbonate bedrock

- Amberjack Hole – Blue Hole 48 km off the coast of Sarasota, Florida
- Blue Hole (Guam) – Submarine sinkhole off the west coast of Guam
- Blue Hole (Red Sea) – Submarine sinkhole north of Dahab, Egypt
- Dean's Blue Hole – Deep water-filled sinkhole in the Bahamas
- Dragon Hole – Deep underwater sinkhole in the South China Sea
- Great Blue Hole – Marine sinkhole off the coast of Belize
- Green Banana Hole – Blue hole off the coast of Sarasota, Florida
- Samaesan Hole – Technical Dive Site in Thailand

== Freshwater dive sites ==
- Blue Lake (Utah) – Large geothermal pond in Utah, U.S.
- Ewens Ponds – Flooded sinkholes in South Australia
- Homestead caldera – Thermal springs in Utah
- Little Blue Lake – Flooded sinkhole dive site in South Australia
- Picaninnie Ponds – Karst spring in South Australia
- Silfra – Water-filled rift in Iceland between the North American and Eurasian tectonic plates
- Wast Water – Body of water in Cumbria, England

=== Flooded quarries and mines ===
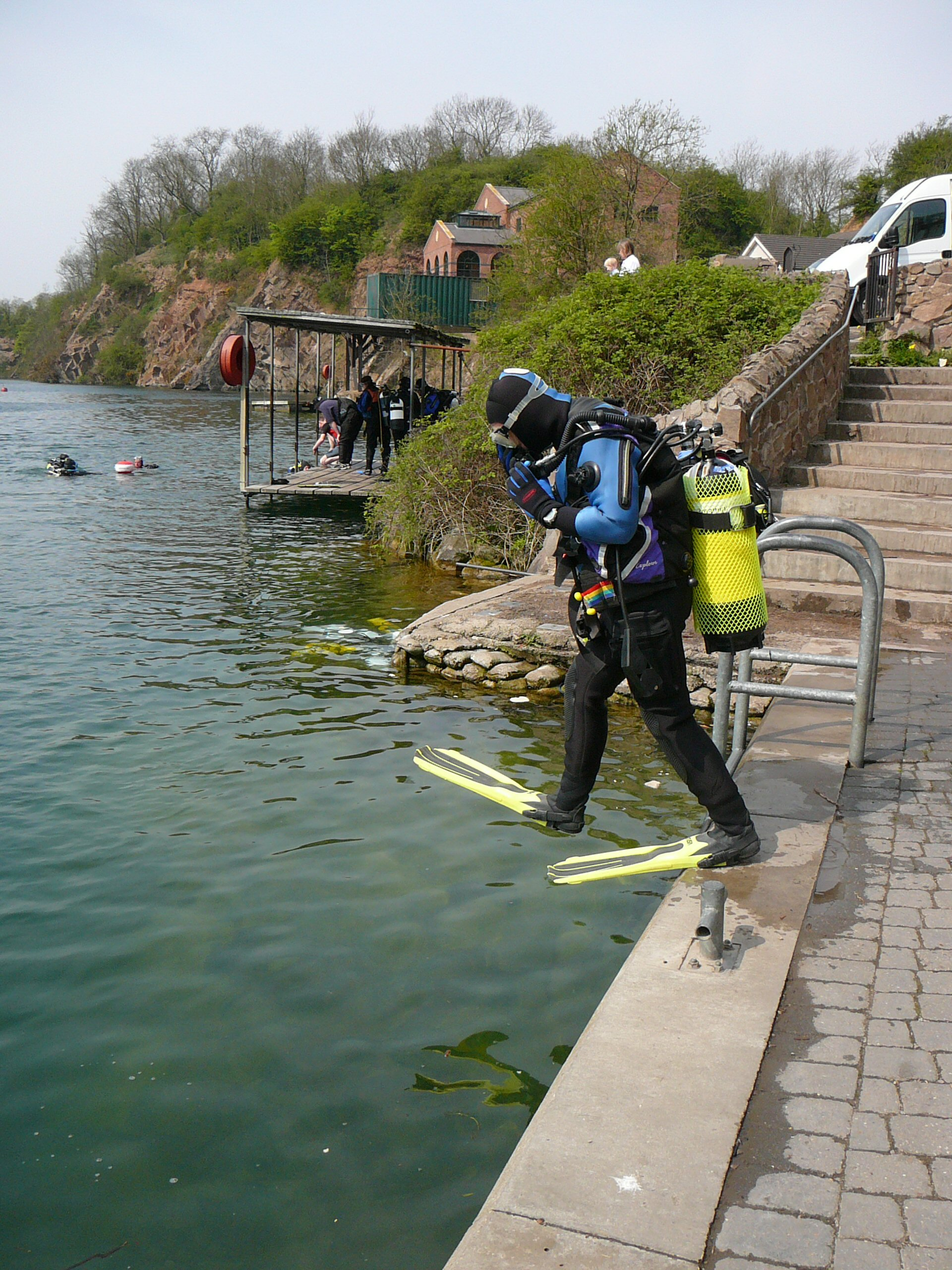
Diving at Stoney Cove

- Capernwray Dive Centre – Flooded quarry in Lancashire, England, used as a recreational dive site
- Dorothea quarry – Former slate quarry near Nantlle, in Carnarvonshire, Wales
- Dosthill quarry – Flooded quarry in England used for scuba diving near Tamworth, Staffordshire
- Dutch Springs – Flooded quarry in Pennsylvania used as a recreational diving site
- Eccleston Quarry – Flooded quarry used as a recreational dive site
- National Diving and Activity Centre – Flooded quarry in Gloucestershire, England
- Ponce de Leon Springs State Park – Florida State Park in Holmes County
- Rum Jungle Lake – Flooded open cast mine near Darwin, Australia
- Stoney Cove – Flooded quarry in Leicestershire used for scuba diving
- Wazee Lake – Artificial lake of Wisconsin, US

=== Deep pools and tanks ===
- Deep Dive Dubai – Deep swimming pool in Dubai
- Deepspot – Deep swimming pool in Poland
- Hotel Terme Millepini – Hotel with 40m deep underwater diving pool
- Nemo 33 – Indoor recreational diving facility

== Wreck diving regions ==
Wreck diving regions: Regions known for having more than one shipwreck used as a recreational dive site:

- Calve Island – Uninhabited island on the west coast of Scotland
- Chuuk Lagoon – Atoll in the Federated States of Micronesia
- Coron Bay – Bight in Palawan, Philippines
- Edmonds Underwater Park – Recreational dive site in Seattle, Washington
- Firth of Clyde – Inlet on the west coast of Scotland
- Gutter Sound – Sound in Scapa Flow, Orkney, United Kingdom
- Loch Long – Sea-loch in Argyll and Bute, Scotland
- Maritime Heritage Trail – Battle of Saipan – Group of WWII wrecks in the lagoon at Saipan in the Northern Mariana Islands
- Michigan Underwater Preserves – Protected areas of the Great Lakes on Michigan's coast
- Pearl and Hermes Atoll – Atoll of Hawaii
- Porteau Cove Provincial Park – Place in British Columbia, Canada
- Robben Island Marine Protected Area – Marine conservation area in South Africa
- Scapa Flow – Bay in the Orkney Islands, Scotland
- Table Mountain National Park Marine Protected Area – Marine conservation area around the Cape Peninsula in South Africa
- Thunder Bay National Marine Sanctuary – Aquatic protected area in Michigan, USA
  - List of shipwrecks in the Thunder Bay National Marine Sanctuary
- Tulagi – Small island in Solomon Islands, north of Guadalcanal
- Tulamben – Village in Karangasem, Bali Province, Indonesia
- Ve Skerries – Small islands in the west of Shetland
- Wardang Island – Island in the Spencer Gulf, South Australia
- Western Rocks, Isles of Scilly – Group of rocks in the Isles of Scilly, England, United Kingdom
- Whitefish Point Underwater Preserve – Reserve to protect and conserve shipwrecks and historical resources in Lake Superior
- Wreck Alley, San Diego – Area off California with several wrecks sunk as artificial reefs

== Wreck diving sites ==
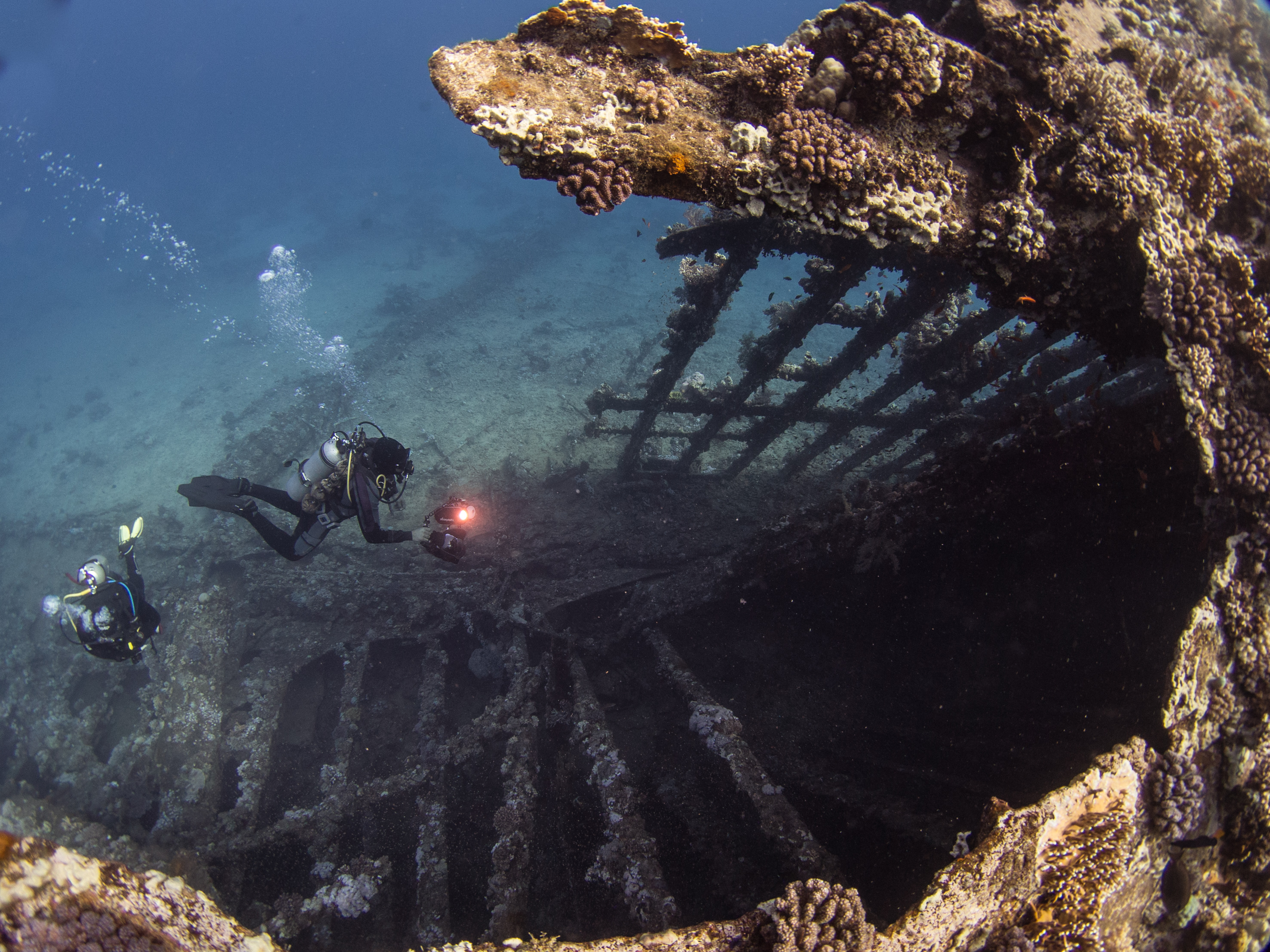
Divers at the wreck of the SS Carnatic

=== A ===
- HMS A1 – Royal Navy's first British-designed submarine
- HMS A3 – A-class submarine of the Royal Navy
- USS Aaron Ward – Gleaves-class destroyer of the United States Navy
- SS Abessinia – German steamship and British recreational dive site
- USS Accokeek – Auxiliary ocean tug of the United States Navy,
- HMAS Adelaide – Frigate of the Royal Australian Navy, lead ship of the class
- SS Admiral Sampson – American-flagged cargo and passenger steamship
- MV Adolphus Busch – Ship sunk off Looe Key, Florida, as an artificial reef and dive site
- MV Aeolian Sky – Greek registered freighter sunk off Dorset after a collision
- USS Aeolus – Attack cargo ship converted into a cable repair ship
- Agat World War II Amtrac – Sunken amphibious tracked landing vehicle
- Aikoku Maru – Armed merchant cruiser of the Imperial Japanese Navy
- SS Ajax – Cargo steamship that was built in Germany in 1923
- SS Albert C. Field – Canadian cargo ship, sunk off the Needles during World War II
- USS Algol – Andromeda-class attack cargo ship
- Akitsushima – Ship of the Imperial Japanese Navy
- Alondra – English steamer wrecked off Ireland
- Al Munassir – Amphibious warfare vessel operated by the Royal Navy of Oman
- Amaryllis – Canadian cargo ship
- SS America – Steam packet wrecked off Isle Royale in Lake Superior
- USS Anderson – Sims-class destroyer
- SS Andrea Doria – Italian passenger liner that sank in 1956
- SS Antilla – Hamburg America Line cargo ship scuttled in 1940 off Aruba
- SS Antilles – French cruise ship that ran aground and sank off Mustique
- USS Apogon – Balao-class submarine
- SS Aquila – British built cargo ship sunk off Ambon
- Aratama Maru – Japanese munitions transport ship sunk at Guam
- USS Arkansas – Dreadnought battleship of the United States Navy
- SS Arratoon Apcar – 19th-century British steamship that is now a wreck in Florida
- USS Arthur W. Radford – Spruance-class destroyer in the United States Navy
- USS Atlanta – Atlanta-class light cruiser

=== B ===
- HMAS Bayonet – Attack-class patrol boat of the Royal Australian Navy
- SS Ben Doran – Steam fishing trawler that operated out of Aberdeen
- SS Benwood – Steam cargo ship of the early twentieth century
- MV Bianca C. – Passenger ship sunk off Grenada
- SS Binnendijk – Dutch cargo steamship sunk by a mine off Portland Bill in the English Channel
- HMSAS Bloemfontein – Algerine-class minesweeper built for the Royal Navy in Canada during World War II
- HMS Boadicea – B-class destroyer of the Royal Navy, sunk by enemy action in Lyme Bay
- Booya – Schooner wrecked in Darwin, Australia
- SS Breda – Dutch ship sunk off Scotland in 1940
- Brian Davis – Iris-class buoy tender
- HMAS Brisbane – Australian guided missile destroyer
- HMHS Britannic – Olympic-class ocean liner and WWI hospital ship
- Bud Bar – Artificial reef near Boynton Beach, Florida
- Bungsberg – German cargo ship sunk near Tallinn, Estonia

=== C ===
- HMAS Canberra – Guided missile frigate
- HMCS Cape Breton – Royal Canadian Navy Cape-class maintenance ship
- USCGC Cape Henlopen – Type "C" Cape-class coast guard cutter
- Captain Keith Tibbetts – Class of Soviet anti-submarine frigates
- SS Carl D. Bradley – Self-unloading Great Lakes freighter that sank in a Lake Michigan storm
- SS Carnatic – British steamship wrecked in the gulf of Suez
- Carthaginian II – Steel sailing vessel sunk as artificial reef
- SS Cedarville – Great lakes bulk carrier wrecked in a collision
- ROCS Chen Hai – Casa Grande-class dock landing ship
- SS City of Launceston – Steamship operated by the Launceston and Melbourne Steam Navigation Company
- HMCS Chaudière – Restigouche-class destroyer of the Royal Canadian Navy
- SS Clan Ranald – Turret deck steamship that sank off the Yorke Peninsula, South Australia
- USCGC Comanche – Coast guard cutter
- Constandis – Fishing vessel sunk as a recreational dive site in Limassol Bay, Cyprus
- HMAS Coogee – Passenger ferry that briefly served as a Royal Australian Navy armed patrol vessel
- SMS Cormoran – German armed merchant raider of WWI scuttled at Guam
- HMS Coronation – 90-gun second-rate ship of the line of the English Royal Navy
- Crusader – Australian Army amphibious operations support ship of World War II
- USS Curb – Diver-class rescue and salvage ship
- USCGC Cuyahoga – US Coast Guard Active-class patrol boat

=== D ===
- MV Dania – Cargo ship scuttled as a dive site off Bamburi, Kenya
- David Tucker – Steel-hulled patrol boat of the 95-Foot or Cape class
- SMS Dresden – Light cruiser of the German Imperial Navy
- SS D.R. Hanna – 552-foot steel freighter that sank on Lake Huron in 1919
- USCGC Duane – United States Coast Guard cutter
- SS Dunraven – British cargo vessel wrecked in the Gulf of Suez
- SS Dwight L. Moody – Liberty ship of WWII

=== E ===
- Eagle – Freighter sunk as an artificial reef in Florida
- SS Eastfield – Ship sunk off Cornwall in 1917, now a dive site
- SS Eber Ward – Package freighter sunk in the Straits of Mackinac
- SS Edgar E. Clark – American Liberty ship
- HMT Elk – British trawler sunk off Plymouth in 1940
- SS Ellengowan – Schooner shipwrecked in Darwin, Australia
- USS Emmons – Gleaves-class destroyer
- RMS Empress of Ireland – Canadian ocean liner that sank in 1914
- SS Espagne – Belgian cargo ship sunk in English Channel

=== F ===
- HMS Falmouth – Town-class light cruiser of the Royal Navy
- Fifi – Tugboat that caught fire and sank in Bahrain
- SS Francisco Morazan – German built cargo ship wrecked in Lake Michigan
- Fujikawa Maru – Japanese armed transport ship sunk in Truk lagoon
- Japanese destroyer Fumizuki – Mutsuki-class destroyer of the Imperial Japanese Navy sunk at Truk

=== G ===
- SMS Geier – Unprotected cruiser of the German Imperial Navy
- SATS General Botha – Mersey class cruiser
- SS George Dewey – Liberty ship of WWII
- USNS General Hoyt S. Vandenberg – US Navy transport ship sunk as artificial reef at Key West
- Georg Thiele – Type 1934 class destroyer
- HMS Ghurka – Tribal-class destroyer of the Royal Navy sunk off Dungeness by a German mine
- USS Gilliam – Attack transport ship sunk at Bikini atoll
- Glen Strathallan – British ship scuttled in Plymouth sound as a dive site
- SAS Good Hope – Loch-class frigate in the South African Navy
- HMAS Goorangai – Auxiliary minesweeper of the Royal Australian Navy
- SS Gothenburg – British steamship wrecked on the Great Barrier Reef
- MV Gregory Poole – Admirable-class minesweeper

=== H ===
- MT Haven – Crude oil carrier that sank off the coast of Genoa, Italy in 1991
- MT Hephaestus – Bunkering oil tanker which ran aground off Qawra, Malta
- Hermann Künne – Type 1936-class destroyer
- HMS Hermes – 1924 unique aircraft carrier
- Herzogin Cecilie – German-built four-masted barque wrecked near Salcombe
- Hilma Hooker – Shipwreck in Bonaire in the Caribbean Netherlands
- SS Hispania – Swedish steamship wrecked in the Sound of Mull, now a dive site
- HMS Hood – Royal Sovereign-class battleship of the Royal Navy scuttled in Portland Harbour
- HMAS Hobart – Royal Australian Navy scuttled shipwreck

=== I ===
- I-1 – Imperial Japanese Navy submarine
- Igara – Bulk carrier wrecked off the coast of Malaysia in 1973
- USS Indra – Landing craft repair ship built for the United States Navy during World War II
- Irako – Japanese supply ship during the Second World War
- SS Ironsides – Wooden-hulled American package freighter on Great Lakes service
- SS Isaac M. Scott – American Great Lakes freighter

=== J ===
- HMAS J1 – J class submarine
- HMAS J2 – J class submarine
- HMAS J4 – J class submarine
- HMAS J5 – 1916 J class submarine
- SS James Eagan Layne – Liberty ship sunk off Cornwall, now a dive site
- Jura – Wooden, flush deck, paddle steamer,

=== K ===
- Kashi Maru – Japanese auxiliary minelayer, now a dive site in the Solomon Islands
- King Cruiser – Car ferry that sank off the West Coast of Southern Thailand
- USS Kittiwake – Chanticleer-class submarine rescue vessel
- Kizugawa Maru – World War II-era Japanese freighter ship
- SMS Kronprinz – Battleship of the German Imperial Navy
- Kyarra – Cargo and passenger luxury liner torpedoed and sunk near Swanage

=== L ===
- Lady Thetis – Cypriot passenger ship sunk for use as a recreational dive site
- HMS Laforey – Royal Navy destroyer sunk by a mine off Sussex
- USS Lamson – Mahan-class destroyer
- USAT Liberty – United States Army cargo ship
- SS Louis Sheid – Belgian-owned cargo steamship, now a recreational dive site off South Devon
- USS LST-507 – US Tank landing ship sunk off the south coast of England, now a dive site

=== M ===
- HMS M2 – Royal Navy submarine monitor wrecked in Lyme Bay
- HMCS Mackenzie
- SS Maine – British ship sunk in 1917 near Dartmouth, Devon. Now a recreational dive site
- SS Maloja – UK registered passenger steamship sunk by a mine off Dover
- HMS Maori – Royal Navy Tribal class destroyer sunk in Malta
- SS Maori – Shoreline historical wreck in Leeugat Bay on the Cape Peninsula west coast
- Marguerite – French ship sunk in Lyme Bay in 1917. Now a dive site
- SMS Markgraf – Battleship of the German Imperial Navy
- SS Mauna Loa – American cargo ship
- USAT Meigs – United States Army transport ship sunk in Darwin Harbour
- SS Mendi – Passenger steamship that sank after a collision south of the Isle of Wight
- MV Mercedes I – Merchant ship built in 1952 in Hamburg, Germany
- MS Mikhail Lermontov – Soviet cruise liner wrecked in the Marlborough Sounds, New Zealand
- SS Milwaukee – Great lakes train ferry that foundered in a storm
- USS Mindanao – US Navy Luzon-class internal combustion engine repair ship in service 1943-1947
- SS Miowera – Passenger and refrigerated cargo liner
- USS Mizpah – United States Navy patrol yacht
- USCGC Mohawk – U.S. Coast Guard cutter sunk as artificial reef off south-west Florida
- SS Mohegan – British steamship wrecked off of Cornwall in 1898
- RMS Moldavia – British ship sunk in 1918 off Beachy Head, now a dive site
- HMS Montagu – Pre-dreadnought battleship of the British Royal Navy
- MV RMS Mulheim – German owned container ship wrecked at Land's End, Cornwall
- USS Muliphen – Andromeda-class attack cargo ship

=== N ===
- Nagato – Super-dreadnought sunk by nuclear test in Bikini atoll
- USS New York – Second United States Navy armored cruiser so designated
- HMCS Nipigon – Annapolis-class destroyer of the Royal Canadian Navy

=== O ===
- SS Oceana – Cargo and passenger ship sunk off Beachy Head after a collision
- Oite – Kamikaze-class destroyer built for the Imperial Japanese Navy during the 1920s
- USS Oriskany – Essex-class aircraft carrier of the US Navy
- MS Oslofjord – Ocean liner sunk after hitting a mine off the River Tyne
- Ozone – Paddle steamer built in Scotland in 1886

=== P ===
- Maltese patrol boat P29 – Ship scuttled as dive site off Malta
- Maltese patrol boat P31 – Minesweeper/patrol boat scuttled for use as a recreational dive site
- SS Panay – Passenger vessel built for the Great Western Railway
- SS Papoose – Oil tanker built in 1921
- SS Pedernales – Lake tanker damaged by a torpedo at Aruba, part of the ships remains as dive site
- Peristera shipwreck – Historical shipwreck in Greece
- HMS Perseus – British submarine
- SS Persier – British ship sunk in Plymouth Sound in 1945. Now a dive site
- HMAS Perth – Australian guided missile destroyer
- SS Pewabic – Package freighter that served ports on the Upper Great Lakes
- SAS Pietermaritzburg – Algerine-class minesweeper built for the Royal Navy during World War II
- USS Pilotfish – Balao-class submarine sunk at Bikini atoll
- MS Piłsudski – Polish passenger ship sunk off the Yorkshire coast
- SS Pioneer – Steam dredging ship
- USCGC Point Swift – United States Coast Guard cutter
- MV Pool Fisher – British merchant vessel that sank off the Isle of Wight
- SS Port Kembla – Steamer owned by the Commonwealth and Dominion Line
- HMS Port Napier – British World War II auxiliary minesweeper that caught fire and exploded
- SS President Coolidge – American ocean liner sunk in 1942
- Preußen – German steel-hulled five-masted ship-rigged windjammer sunk in Crab Bay after a collision
- HMS Prince of Wales – King George V-class battleship of the Royal Navy

=== Q ===
- PS Queen Victoria – Paddle steamer wrecked off the Baily Lighthouse, Ireland

=== R ===
- SS Radaas – Ship sunk in 1917 near Portland Bill, now a dive site
- Rainbow Warrior – Greenpeace vessel bombed by French intelligence operatives in Auckland harbour (1985)
- USS Rankin – US Navy Tolland-class attack cargo ship in service 1945-1947, 1952-1971
- SS Regina – Steel ship that foundered in Lake Huron in a storm
- HMS Repulse – 1916 Renown-class battlecruiser of the Royal Navy
- RMS Rhone – Royal Mail Ship wrecked off Salt Island in the British Virgin Islands in a hurricane
- Riva Palacio – Admirable-class minesweeper built for the United States Navy
- USS Rochester – Second United States Navy armored cruiser so designated
- SS Rondo – Ship sunk in Sound of Mull in 1935, now a recreational dive site
- SS Rosehill – Steam collier torpedoed and sunk near Fowey, Cornwall
- SS Rotorua – New Zealand Shipping Company steam ocean liner and refrigerated cargo ship
- Royal Adelaide – Iron sailing ship wrecked on Chesil Beach
- Royal Charter – Steam clipper wrecked off Anglesey, UK
- MV Rozi – Tugboat scuttled as a dive site off Malta

=== S ===
- HMS Safari – Royal Navy S-class submarine which served in World War II
- HMCS Saguenay – Destroyer of the Royal Canadian Navy
- Sakawa – Agano-class light cruiser
- MV Salem Express – Car and passenger ferry wrecked off the Egyptian coast
- Sanko Harvest – Bulk carrier that sank off Esperance, Western Australia
- USS Saratoga – Lexington-class aircraft carrier
- HMCS Saskatchewan – Mackenzie-class destroyer of the Royal Canadian Navy
- USS Scrimmage – Admirable-class minesweeper built for the United States Navy
- USS Scuffle – Admirable class minesweeper sunk as an artificial reef off Cozumel
- HMS Scylla – 22nd Leander-class frigate of the Royal Navy
- HMS Sidon – Royal Navy submarine sunk in Portland Harbour by explosion of a faulty torpedo
- USCGC Spar – Iris class sea going buoy tender
- USS Spiegel Grove – US Navy ship sunk off Key Largo as an artificial reef
- Stanegarth – Steam tugboat scuttled as a dive feature at Stoney Cove
- SS Stanwood – Cargo steamship wreck and recreational dive site
- SS Stella – Passenger ferry wrecked off the Casquets in 1899
- SS Stepas Darius – Liberty ship built in the United States during World War II
- HMAS Swan – Australian naval ship, built 1970

=== T ===
- USCGC Tamaroa – Coast guard cutter
- USS Tarpon – Submarine of the United States
- Texas Clipper – Merchant marine training vessel with the Texas Maritime Academy
- SS Thesis – Steamship wrecked in 1889 in the Sound of Mull, Scotland
- SS Thistlegorm – British armed merchantman sunk in the Red Sea at Ras Muhammad
- Thunderbolt Wreck – Mine planter of The US Army
- Toa Maru – Japanese transport ship sunk by a submarine off Gizo, Solomon Islands
- HMAS Tobruk – Modified Round Table-class Landing Ship Heavy of the Royal Australian Navy
- Tokai Maru – Japanese passenger-cargo ship sunk in Apra Harbor, Guam
- SS Torrey Canyon – Oil tanker wrecked off the coast of Cornwall
- SAS Transvaal – Loch-class frigate in the South African Navy
- MV Treasure – June 2000 environmental disaster off the coast of South Africa
- HMNZS Tui – Conrad class oceanographic ship

=== U ===
- U-40 – German submarine sunk by a mine in the English Channel
- U-352 – German World War II submarine
- U-1195 – German World War II submarine
- Um El Faroud – Libyan owned tanker scuttled as dive site off Malta

=== V ===
- SS Varvassi – Greek freighter wrecked at The Needles in a storm after engine failure
- USS Vermilion – Tolland-class attack cargo ship
- SS Vienna – Steamship sunk after a collision in Lake Superior

=== W ===
- HMNZS Waikato – Leander class frigate of the Royal New Zealand Navy
- SS Walter L M Russ – German freighter wrecked in St George's Channel
- SS Washingtonian – American freighter that sank off Delaware after a collision
- TSS Waterford (1912) – Passenger vessel built for the Great Western Railway
- HMNZS Wellington – Leander class frigate sunk as artificial reef off Wellington, New Zealand
- USS Wilkes-Barre – Cleveland-class light cruiser

=== Y ===
- USS Yancey – US Navy Andromeda-class attack cargo ship
- YO-257 – US Navy yard oiler scuttled off Waikiki, Honolulu, Hawaii
- SS Yongala – Passenger steamship that was wrecked in Queensland, Australia
- HMCS Yukon – Mackenzie-class destroyer of the Royal Canadian Navy

=== Z ===
- MS Zenobia – RO-RO ferry that capsized and sank near Larnaca, Cyprus
- SS Zealandia – Australian cargo and passenger steamship sunk in the bombing of Darwin
- Zingara – Cargo vessel wrecked in the Straits of Tiran in the Red Sea
