= Begg Rock State Marine Reserve =

Marine protected area in California, US

Begg Rock State Marine Reserve (SMR) is a marine protected area that protects the waters around Begg Rock, about 60 mi (97 km) off California's south coast near San Nicolas Island. The SMR covers 37.96 mi^{2} (98.3 km^{2}). The SMR prohibits the taking of all living marine resources.

== History ==
Begg Rock SMR is one of 36 new marine protected areas adopted by the California Fish and Game Commission in December, 2010 during the third phase of the Marine Life Protection Act Initiative. The MLPAI is a collaborative public process to create a statewide network of protected areas along California’s coastline.

The south coast’s new marine protected areas were designed by local divers, fishermen, conservationists and scientists who comprised the South Coast Regional Stakeholder Group. Their job was to design a network of protected areas that would preserve sensitive sea life and habitats while enhancing recreation, study and education opportunities.

The south coast marine protected areas went into effect in 2012.

== Geography and natural features ==
Begg Rock SMR is a marine protected area that protects the waters around Begg Rock, 60 miles off California’s south coast.

This area includes all state waters below the mean high tide line surrounding Begg Rock, in the vicinity of 33°21.71′N 119°41.76′W.

== Habitat and wildlife ==
Begg Rock SMR is a unique, highly exposed offshore rock/pinnacle ecosystem with ridges as well as deep water hard and soft bottom habitats. The fauna includes a rare lumpy form of purple hydrocoral, rockfish and scallops.

== Scientific monitoring ==
As specified by the Marine Life Protection Act, select marine protected areas along California’s south coast are being monitored by scientists to track their effectiveness and learn more about ocean health. Similar studies in marine protected areas located off of the Santa Barbara Channel Islands have already detected gradual improvements in fish size and number.

== See also ==
- List of marine protected areas of California
