= Coron Bay =

Bight in Palawan, Philippines

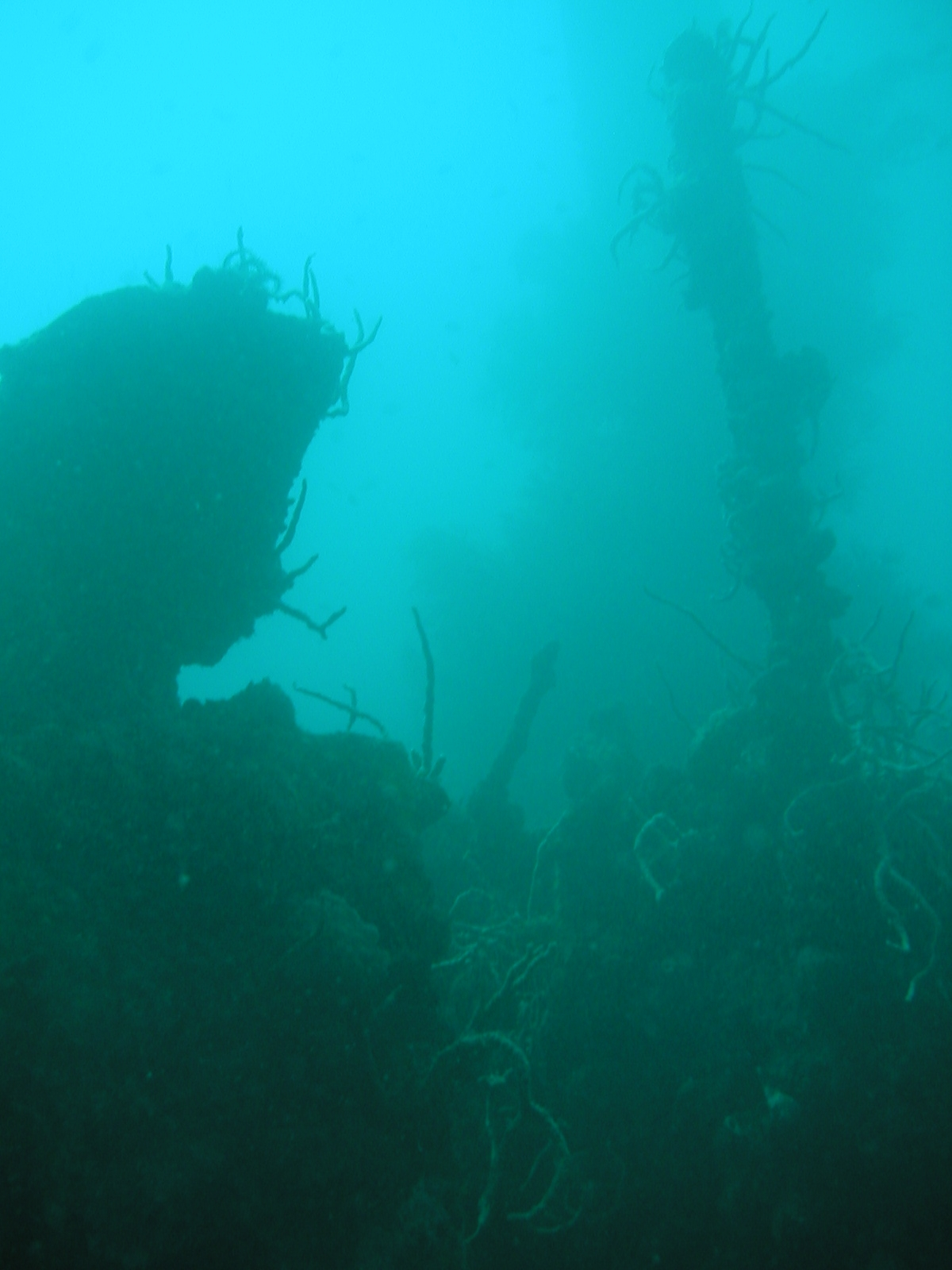
- Wreck in Coron Bay

- Location within Philippines
- Location: Palawan, Philippines
- Coordinates: 11°54′N 120°9′E
- Type: Bay
- Basin countries: Philippines

Coron Bay is a well-known recreational diving region in the Sulu Sea in the western Philippines, between the islands of Coron and Busuanga in the Calamian Islands. Most of Coron Bay is in the Coron Island Protected Area and is a traditional fishing area of the indigenous Tagbanwa tribe.

Coron Bay is famous for diving on ten Japanese shipwrecks. The ships Akitsushima, Okikawa Maru, Irako, Kogyo Maru, Olympia Maru, Taiei Maru, Kyokuzan Maru, Terukaze Maru and Lusong Gunboat were sunk on September 24, 1944, by the third air fleet of US Task Force 38. The wrecks can be reached in a one-hour drive from Coron by dive boat. With the exception of the Lusong Gunboat, which partially breaks through the water surface and is therefore suitable for snorkelers, and the Terukaze Maru, which is suitable for beginners at a depth of 5 to 20 m, all other wrecks lie at depths of 14 to 46 m. Some of the wrecks are over 100 m long and have decks, corridors, galleys, and other sights that can be dived. Some equipment was salvaged in the 1970s from some of the wrecks (e.g. some the engine blocks and propeller shafts were removed), but there is still various equipment and some munitions to be found. Because of the varying depth and size of the sunken ships there are shipwrecks suitable for divers of all experience range. lev
