= SS Rondo =

Ship sunk in Sound of Mull in 1935, now a recreational dive site

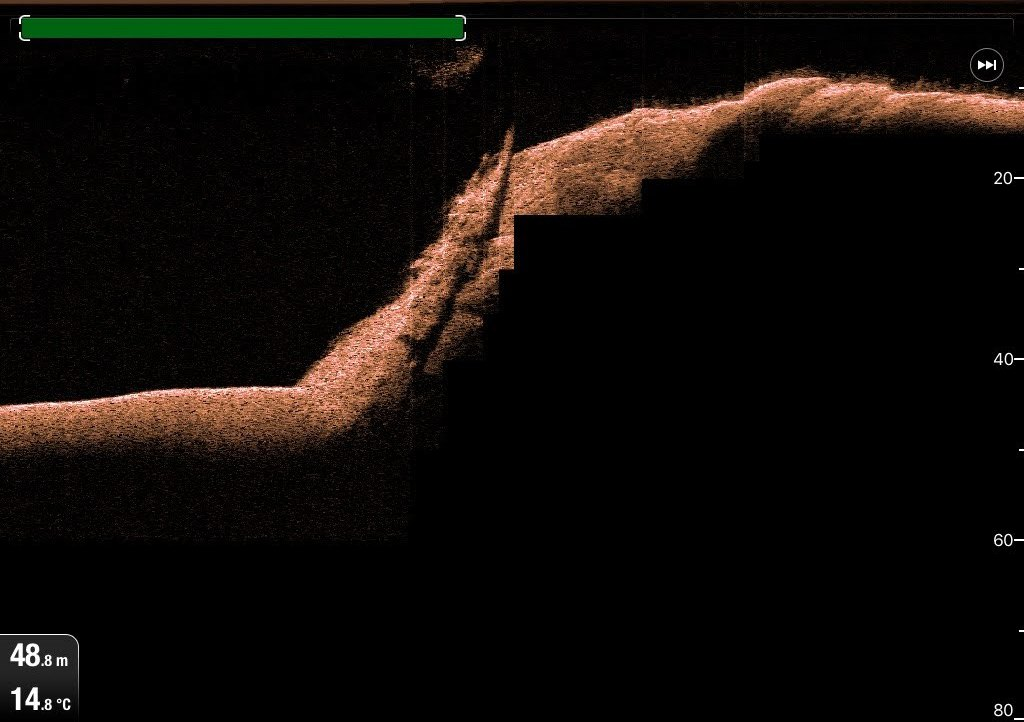
- Sonar image of wreck of SS Rondo

History
- Name: War Wonder (1917-1918); Lithopolis (1918-1930); Laurie (1930-1934); Rondo (1934-1935)
- Owner: The Shipping Controller (1917-1918); US Shipping Board (1918-1930); Torsborg A/S (1930-1934); Bucha Godager & Company (1934-1935)
- Builder: Tampa Shipbuilding & Drydock Company, Florida
- Yard number: 31
- Launched: 1917
- Fate: Wrecked on 25 January 1935

General characteristics
- Class & type: Steam cargo ship
- Tonnage: 2,363 GRT
- Length: 264 ft (80 m)
- Beam: 42 ft (13 m)
- Depth: 35 ft (11 m)
- Installed power: 1200 IHP
- Propulsion: Triple expansion engines; 3 boilers; 1 screw
- Speed: 10.5 kn (12.1 mph)

SS Rondo was a steam cargo ship. She was built by Tampa Shipbuilding & Drydock Company of Florida for the British government under the name War Wonder and was launched in 1917. The First World War ended before she entered service and she entered service for the US Shipping Board as the Lithopolis. She was sold to various Norwegian companies, becoming the Laurie, and finally the Rondo in 1934.

She sank off the west coast of Scotland on 25 January 1935 in the Sound of Mull whilst seeking shelter from a storm. The ship stands vertically on a drop off at 56°32.30′N 5°54.75′W with the stern in less than 10m and the bow below 50m.
