= Tayyib Al-Ism =

Town in Tabuk, north-western Saudi Arabia

Coordinates: 28.5667°N 34.8333°E

Tabuk Province

Tayyib-Ism is a small town in north-western Saudi Arabia in the province of Tabuk. It is located in the upland area (314 m), approx. 10km east of the eastern coast of the Gulf of Aqaba, Red Sea, at 28° 34' 0"n, 34° 50' 0"e. To the west of the village there are unspoiled coral reefs. The site is considered important to some in the Latter Day Saint movement.
