= Japanese seaplane tender Akitsushima =

Ship of the Imperial Japanese Navy

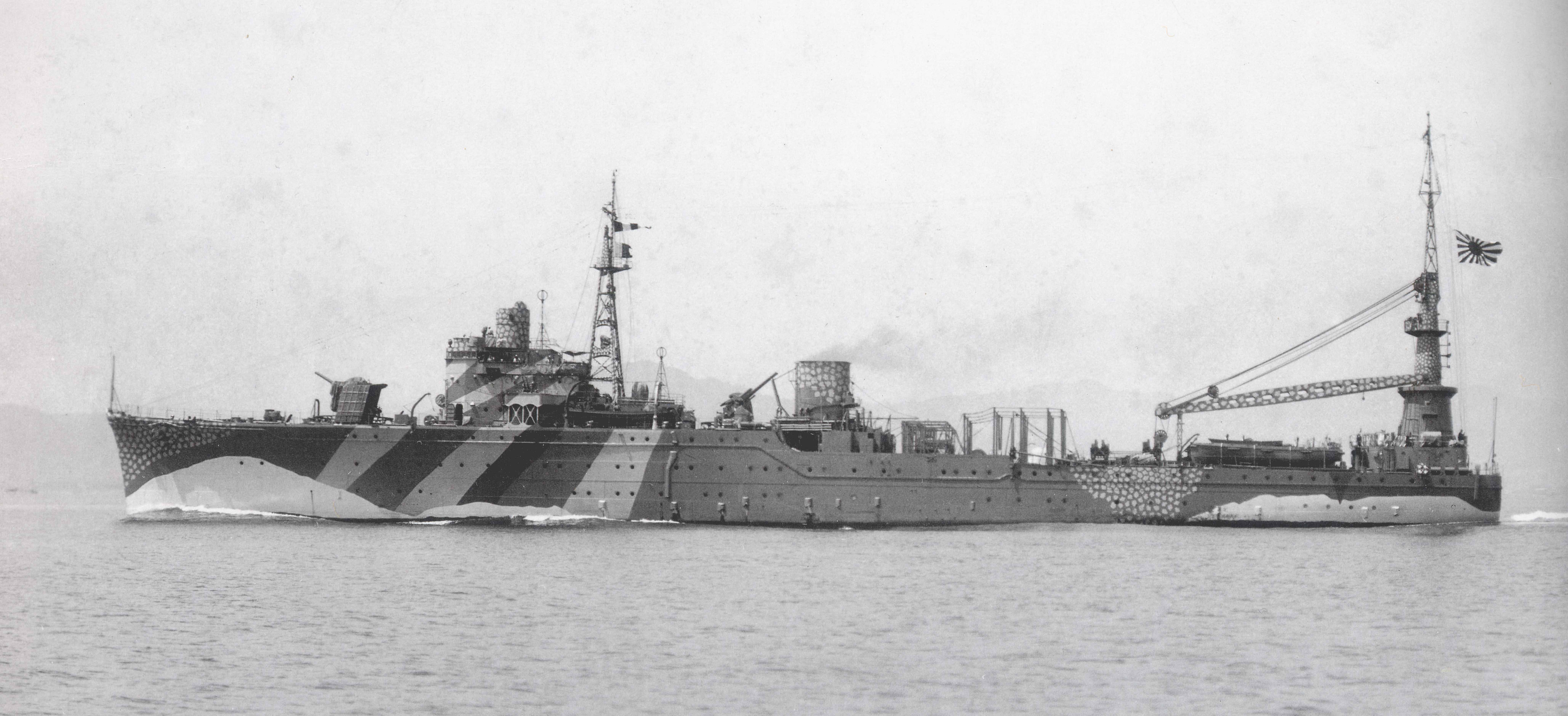
- Akitsushima on 18 April 1942

History

Empire of Japan
- Name: Akitsushima
- Namesake: Another name of Japan
- Builder: Kawasaki Shipbuilding Corporation
- Laid down: 29 October 1940
- Launched: 25 July 1941
- Completed: 29 April 1942
- Commissioned: 29 April 1942
- Decommissioned: 10 November 1944
- Maiden voyage: 29 April 1942
- In service: 1942–1944
- Fate: Sunk on 24 September 1944

General characteristics
- Type: Seaplane tender
- Displacement: 4,650 long tons (4,725 t) standard; 5,000 long tons (5,080 t) trial
- Length: 114.8 m (376 ft 8 in) overall; 113.0 m (370 ft 9 in) waterline
- Beam: 15.8 m (51 ft 10 in)
- Draught: 5.4 m (17 ft 9 in)
- Propulsion: 4 × Kampon Mk.22 Model 10 diesels, 2 shafts, 8,000 bhp (6,000 kW)
- Speed: 19.0 knots (35.2 km/h; 21.9 mph)
- Range: 8,000 nmi (15,000 km; 9,200 mi) at 14 kn (26 km/h; 16 mph)
- Capacity: 689 tons gasoline; 36 × Type 91 torpedoes; 30 × 800 kg bombs; 15 × 500 kg bombs; 100 × 250 kg bombs; 100 × 60 kg bombs
- Complement: 545
- Armament: 4 × 127 mm (5.0 in) L/40 Type 89 AA guns; 4 × Type 96 25mm AA guns; 6 × Type 95 depth charges; 1 × Type 94 depth charge thrower (Y-gun)
- Aircraft carried: 1 × flying boat (in anchorage only)
- Aviation facilities: deck and crane

Akitsushima (秋津洲) was a seaplane tender of the Imperial Japanese Navy (IJN), serving during World War II from 1942 until being sunk in September 1944.

== Design ==
In 1938, the IJN wanted to use their large-sized flying boats more effectively, because the Kawanishi H6K was the only aircraft able to hit Pearl Harbor directly from the Marshall Islands. However, the Marshall Islands did not have flying boat facilities at that time. Early in 1939, the IJN converted the oiler Kamoi to a seaplane tender. However, she was not able to repair seaplanes.

The IJN therefore planned two kinds of seaplane tenders which were included in the Maru 4 Programme. One was a 10,000-ton class flying boat carrier, the other a 2,400-ton class flying boat tender. These plans were not able to pass the assessment by the Ministry of Finance. These two basic plans were revived by the Maru 5 Programme in 1941. However, their construction did not begin. Therefore, the IJN planned a 3,500-ton class tender, which was a scaled-up model of the 2,400-ton class. The ships should be able to maintain, repair and supply seaplanes. The IJN intended to accommodate the flying boat by bow-up trim and slope at first, however this plan was cancelled and the Akitsushima class was equipped with a 35-ton crane. The IJN changed the design frequently, ending up with a displacement increased by 1,000 tons.

== Operational service ==
While running sea trials off Wadamisaki, Kobe, Japan, on 21 April 1942 in the aftermath of the Doolittle Raid — which had taken place on 18 April — Akitsushima opened fire on an approaching Japanese transport plane her crew mistook for a United States Army Air Forces B-25 Mitchell medium bomber. Splinters from Akitsushima′s anti-aircraft shells struck the nearby Japanese passenger ship Tennyo Maru, prompting Tennyo Maru to transmit a mistaken report that the plane had attacked her with machine-gun fire.

Akitsushima was commissioned on 29 April 1942 and assigned to the 25th Air Flotilla, 11th Air Fleet. Two weeks later, she sailed to Saipan and Rabaul. After the U.S. invasion of Guadalcanal, Akitsushima arrived at the Shortland Islands on 16 August 1942. She was damaged by B-17E Flying Fortress bombers at Buka Island two weeks later.

Her repairs were completed on 5 January 1943, and she was dispatched to Kavieng, only to proceed to Jaluit Atoll in February. On 30 June 1943 she sailed to Paramushir for the evacuation of Kiska. She returned to Yokosuka in August and sailed via Shanghai to Truk. Here, she was slightly damaged by U.S. carrier planes which attacked Truk during Operation Hailstone. The following month, Akitsushima was assigned to the 14th Air Fleet and returned to Yokosuka for repairs. She also received repair ship facilities, because the repair ship Akashi had been sunk. Her refit was completed on 1 August 1944, and she was assigned to the 2nd Fleet.

In August 1944, she sailed to Kure and Imari, then to Kaohsiung and Manila, finally arriving at Coron Bay on 23 September 1944. Here she was sunk by aircraft of Task Force 38 the following day. Akitsushima was officially struck from the Naval register on 10 November 1944.

== Ships in class ==
Ship #	Ship	Builder	Laid down	Launched	Completed	Fate
131	Akitsushima (秋津州)	Kawasaki Shipbuilding, Kōbe Shipyard	29 October 1940	25 July 1941	29 April 1942	Sunk by aircraft at Coron Bay 11°59′N 120°02′E, 24 September 1944.
303	Chihaya (千早)	Kawasaki Shipbuilding, Kōbe Shipyard	25 July 1941			Construction stopped in Autumn 1942. Later scrapped.
5031; 5032; 5033						Cancelled on 5 May 1944.

== See also ==
- Barnegat-class seaplane tender
- Currituck-class seaplane tender
- Japanese submarine I-351

== Bibliography ==
- "Rekishi Gunzō"., History of Pacific War Vol.62, Ships of The Imperial Japanese Forces, Gakken (Japan), January 2008, ISBN 978-4-05-605008-0
- Model Art Extra No.537, Drawings of Imperial Japanese Naval Vessels Part-3, "Model Art Co. Ltd". Archived from the original on 2012-06-05. (Japan), May 1999
- Collection of writings by Sizuo Fukui Vol.7, Stories of Japanese Aircraft Carriers, "Kōjinsha". (Japan), August 1996, ISBN 4-7698-0655-8
- Ships of the World special issue Vol.40, History of Japanese Aircraft Carriers, "Kaijinsha"., (Japan), May 1994
- The Maru Special, Japanese Naval Vessels No.25 Japanese seaplane tenders, "Ushio Shobō". (Japan), March 1979
