= Shaʽb Abu Nuħas =

Coral reef in the Red Sea

Coordinates: 27.567°N 33.917°E

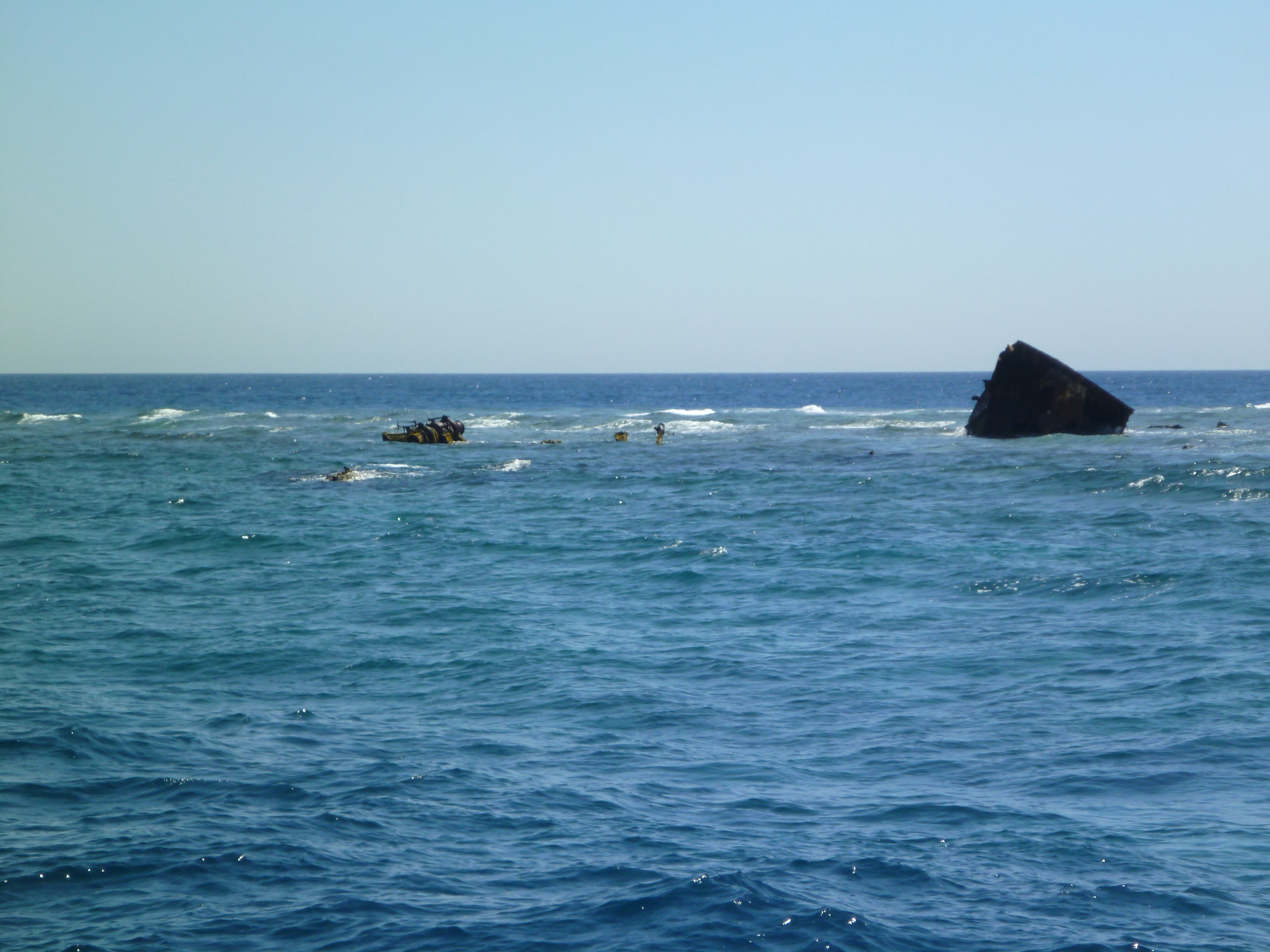
Parts of the wreck Kimon M on Sha`b Abu Nuhas

Shaab Abu Nuhas, or Shaʽb Abu Nuħas (Arabic: شعب أبو النحاس, romanized: Shaʿb Abū an-Nuḥās), is a triangular-shaped coral reef northwest of Shadwan Island in the northern Red Sea off Hurghada.

The reef is a navigation hazard because it projects into the shipping channel, as evidenced by (at least) seven shipwrecks. This includes the SS Carnatic (1896), Kimon M (1978), Olden (1987), Chrisoula K (1981) and Giannis D (1983). The reef and the wrecks are popular for scuba diving; four of the wrecks are at a depth of more than 30 metres (98 ft). The name of the reef is Arabic for "reef of father of copper", after the cargo of one of the wrecks.

== See also ==
- List of reefs
