= SS Carnatic =

British steamship wrecked in the gulf of Suez

Coordinates: 27°34′53″N 33°55′32″E

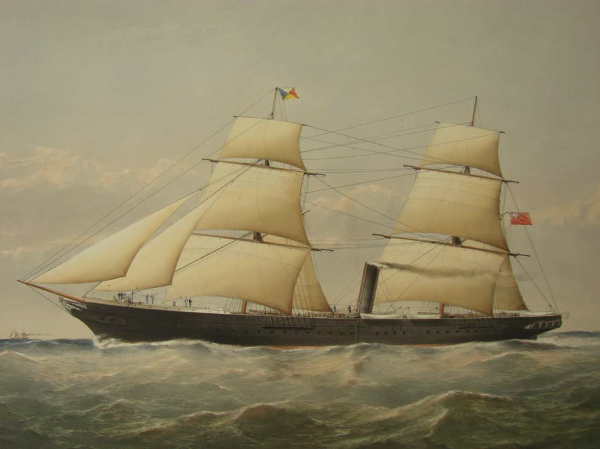
- SS Carnatic

History

United Kingdom
- Name: SS Carnatic
- Operator: P&O
- Builder: Samuda Brothers, Cubitt Town, London
- Laid down: 30 January 1862
- Launched: 6 December 1862
- Completed: 25 April 1863
- Fate: Wrecked, 14 September 1869

General characteristics
- Type: Steam ship
- Tonnage: 1,776 GRT
- Length: 89.4 m (293 ft 4 in)
- Beam: 11.6 m (38 ft 1 in)
- Draught: 7.8 m (25 ft 7 in)
- Propulsion: Humphrys, Tennant and Dykes 4-cylinder compound inverted steam engine, 2,442 hp (1,821 kW), single shaft
- Sail plan: Brig
- Speed: 12 knots (22 km/h; 14 mph)
- Capacity: 250 passengers
- Notes: 30 lives lost in the shipwreck

SS Carnatic was a British steamship built in 1862-63 by Samuda Brothers at Cubitt Town on the Isle of Dogs, London, for the P&O. She operated on the Suez to Bombay run in the last years before the Suez Canal was opened. This route gave a fast, steamship-operated route from Britain to India, connecting with similar steamships running through the Mediterranean Sea to Alexandria, with an overland crossing to Suez. The alternative was to sail round the Cape of Good Hope, a distance at which steam ships were not, in the early 1860s, sufficiently economical to be commercially competitive with sail.

As one of the first British steamships to use a compound engine, Carnatic achieved a much better fuel economy (at 2lbs of coal per indicated horsepower-hour) than most other contemporary steamers. P&O had a number of compound-engined ships built in the first half of the 1860s: Poonah (1863), Golconda (1863) and Baronda (1864).

In 1869, she ran aground on a coral reef in the Red Sea and broke apart the following morning, with the loss of 30 lives. Her wreck was rediscovered in 1984 and is now a popular scuba diving site.

== Ship history ==
The ship was laid down on 30 January 1862, and was originally to be named Mysore. She was launched as Carnatic on 6 December 1862, and completed on 25 April 1863. The composite construction hull (iron-framed and wooden-planked) was fitted with square-rigged sails and a 4-cylinder compound inverted steam engine by Humphrys & Tennant, providing 2,442 hp (1,821 kW) to a single propeller.

The compound engine was unusual at the time for a British vessel. Carnatic's boiler ran at only 26 psi (180 kPa). Higher pressures were not allowed by the Board of Trade. The advantages of a compound engine were not fully realised at this low pressure - but the solution to the problem was to apply a large amount of superheat. The efficiency gained was a fuel usage of just over 2lbs of coal per indicated horsepower-hour. This is comparable to the achievement of the groundbreaking SS Agamemnon (1865) at 2.2lbs per indicated horsepower-hour, but at a boiler pressure of 60 psi (410 kPa).

=== Grounding ===
Having left Suez on 12 September 1869, she struck Sha`b Abu Nuhas coral reef near Shadwan Island at the mouth of the Gulf of Suez in the Red Sea, in the early hours of 13 September. Having assessed the ship to be safe and the pumps intact, Captain P. B. Jones denied passengers' repeated requests to abandon ship, and reassured them that the ship was safe and that the P&O liner Sumatra was due to pass by and would rescue them. There was a general air of calm and normality on board until about 2 a.m. on the 14th, when the rising water engulfed the ship's boilers and the ship was left without power or light. At 11 a.m. the following morning, after 34 hours on the reef, Captain Jones had just given the order to abandon ship and the first four passengers had taken their seats in one of the lifeboats when Carnatic suddenly broke in half. Thirty lives were lost, the number recorded in P&O's official casualty return and the ship's official log; yet some later accounts mention thirty-one. The survivors made it to barren island of Shadwan, where the next day the Sumatra rescued them.

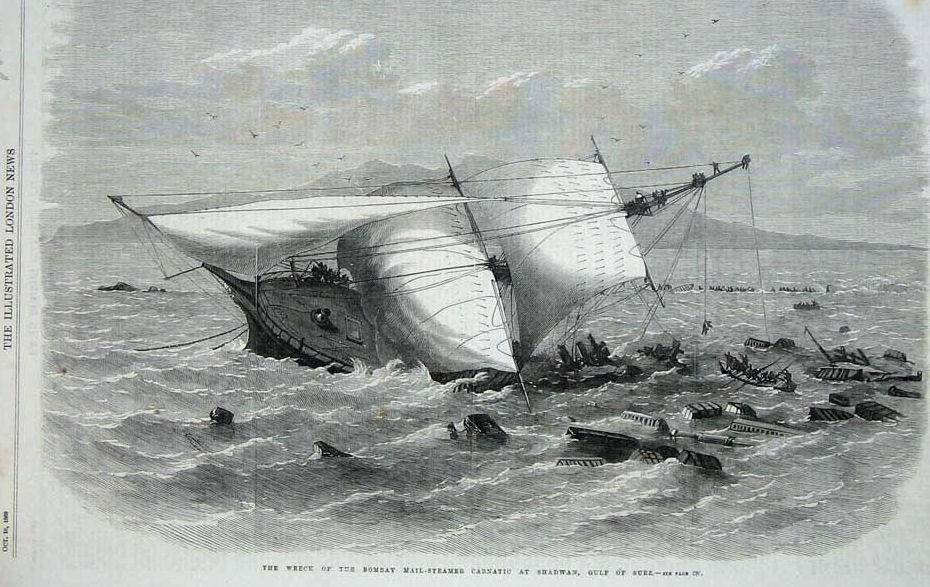
A contemporary print of the wreck of Carnatic

Carnatic was carrying £40,000 worth of gold (well in excess of £1,000,000 in modern terms), so the wreck was the subject of a salvage operation two weeks later. All the gold was reported recovered, but persistent rumours of remaining treasure have added to the romance of the ship.

Captain Jones was recalled to England to face an official Board of Inquiry, which labelled him "a skilful and experienced officer". However, the inquiry added that "it appears there was every condition as regards ship, weather and light to ensure a safe voyage and there was needed only proper care. This was not done, and hence the disaster." Although Jones's Master's certificate was suspended for only nine months, he never returned to sea.

Rediscovered in May 1984, the wreck of the Carnatic is now a popular scuba diving site.

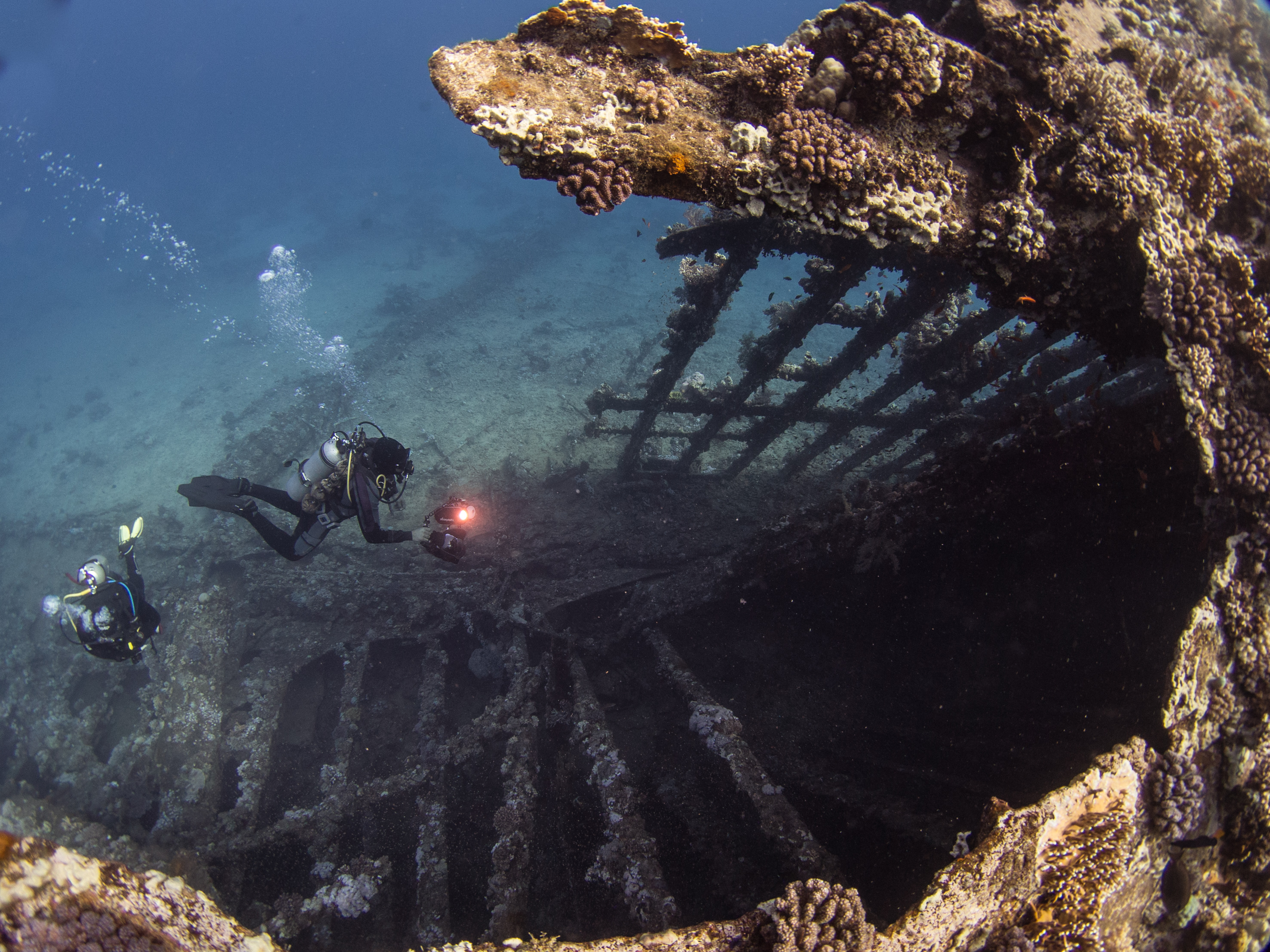
Wreck of the SS Carnatic, in the Red Sea, Egypt.
