= Edmonds Underwater Park =

Recreational dive site in Seattle, Washington

Edmonds Underwater Park (EUP) is a local classic scuba diving site in the northern Seattle, Washington suburb of Edmonds immediately north of the Edmonds Washington State Ferry terminal on the Edmonds-Kingston route. EUP is relatively shallow with a maximum depth of about 45 feet (14 m). There is a grid network of anchored ropes that lead to a variety of submerged features. The park is built and maintained by a group of volunteers that meet every Saturday and Sunday at 9 am.

== Attractions & features ==
There are several submerged shipwrecks including the large tugboat Triumph. The site is famous for very large ling cod, numerous large cabezon, occasional octopus, many surf perch and rockfish, and a lot of invertebrates. Gray whales have been spotted by divers at this site.

Entrance is via moderate surface swims. There is a restroom with diver dressing areas and an outdoor shower that is functional when the weather is above freezing. Just north of the ferry terminal is a 300-foot (91 m) exclusion zone. The site has a good parking area that fills up early. Numerous restaurants and coffee houses are in the immediate area and a local dive shop is conveniently located south of the park on Railroad Avenue.

== Lopez Pontoon ==
A new feature was sunk on November 4, 2009. The Lopez Pontoon is a large concrete piece that served as a bridge fender. Its dimensions are 100 by 20 by 13 inches (254 cm × 51 cm × 33 cm) and rest west of the Triumph. It has 5 chambers in which a diver may easily enter. The pontoon will serve well as a habitat for fish, invertebrates, and algae and sea weeds.
