= SS Hispania (1912) =

Swedish steamship wrecked in the Sound of Mull, now a dive site

History
- Name: Hispania
- Owner: Svenska Lloyd AB
- Operator: H Metcalfe; K R Bökman (1931– )
- Builder: Antwerp Engineering Co Ltd, Hoboken
- Yard number: 59
- Launched: 1912
- Completed: December 1912
- Out of service: 18 December 1954
- Homeport: (Sweden) Gothenburg (1912–40); Vichy France (1940–41); Kriegsmarine (1941–42); (Sweden) Gothenburg (1942–54)
- Identification: Swedish Official Number 5396; Code Letters JTCB (1930–34); Code Letters SEWG (1934–54)
- Fate: Sank 18 December 1954

General characteristics
- Type: Cargo ship
- Tonnage: 1,323 gross register tons (GRT)
- Length: 236 ft 8 in (72.14 m)
- Beam: 37 ft 3 in (11.35 m)
- Depth: 16 ft 2 in (4.93 m)
- Installed power: 1 triple expansion steam engine
- Speed: 9.5 knots (17.6 km/h)
- Crew: 21

SS Hispania was a Swedish 1,323 GRT triple-expansion engine steamer built in Belgium in 1912. She sank in the Sound of Mull on 18 December 1954 after striking a rock.

== Career ==
Hispania was built by the Antwerp Engineering Co Ltd, Hoboken, Antwerp, Belgium. She was yard number 59. Hispania was launched in 1912 and completed in December of that year. She was owned by Svenska Lloyd AB. Hispania was managed by a number of different managers, including H Metcalft, followed by K R Bökman from c1930.

During the Second World War, Hispania was seized by the French authorities. In 1940, she was on a voyage from Kaolack, Senegal via Casablanca, Morocco to Bordeaux, France with a cargo of peanuts. During the voyage, she was attacked and severely damaged. On 2 June 1940, Hispania was detained in Bordeaux. On 8 October 1940, she was seized by the Vichy Government. On 8 November 1940, an application was made to declare her as a war prize. The crew were allowed to return to Sweden in December 1940, except for her captain and a mechanic. On 15 April 1941, Hispania was declared a war prize and ownership passed to the Kriegsmarine. Svenska Lloyd AB objected to this decision. On 8 February 1942, Hispania and Sirius were ordered to sail to Rotterdam under the command of the Kriegsmarine. On 1 November 1942, the Kriegsmarine ceased command of the ship. The next day, a German Schnellboot (fast boat) attack left one dead and two seriously wounded. On 19 December 1942, Hispania was handed back to Svenska Lloyd AB on payment of 44,017.69 ℛ︁ℳ︁. She departed Rotterdam on 1 January 1943, bound for Gothenburg.

== Sinking ==
On 18 December 1954, Hispania sank after hitting a reef in a storm. Heading to Varberg, Sweden, from Liverpool she attempted to navigate through the Sound of Mull but hit the Sgeir More (Big Rock) and started to list. The order to abandon ship was given and the crew lowered the lifeboats and rowed to shore. Captain Ivan Dahn refused to leave the ship and chose to go down with it. The other twenty crew were saved. At the time, Hispania was carrying a cargo of asbestos, rubber sheeting and steel.

== Wreck ==
The wreck sits, intact and upright, in 85 feet (26 m) of clear water, at 56°33′55″N 5°59′13″W. The Hispania can be dived on only during slack water, which is between 1 and 2 hours before high or low water near the Scottish town of Oban. Located in the northern aspects of the Sound of Mull, the Hispania is facing the shore and close to a red channel buoy. The water temperature ranges from 14 °C in summer to as low as 5 °C in winter. In the summer time, a common hazard are the migrating stinging jellyfish that pass over the wreck. Their tentacles often get caught on the shot line and are dangerous to divers.

Sound of Mull Remote Sensing Project (SOMAP) was an underwater survey on the behest of Historic Scotland to catalog all sites in the Sound of Mull. Through research and a through sonar survey, SOMAP was able to determine the status of the SS Hispania. Their findings determined that the ship was salvaged throughout the 1950s by Scarborough Sub-Aqua Club and since then the popularity of diving the wreck has resulted in the removal of all non-ferrous artifacts. No archaeological surveys of the site had been undertaken until SOMAP's involvement. The ship's horn was salvaged in the 1960s by a member of Scarborough Sub-Aqua Club and is now on display there.

Minor damage was caused by a scallop dredger in 1999 when its fishing gear pulled down one of the masts and caused minor scrape damage. A scour pit caused by currents removing sand and mud from one side of the ship is causing the ship to slowly list into the depression. In November 2002 the wreck of Hispania was purchased by the Puffin Dive Centre, Oban.

== Propulsion ==
Hispania was propelled by a triple expansion steam engine which was built by the North East Marine Engine Co Ltd, Newcastle upon Tyne. It had cylinders of 20 inches (51 cm), 33 inches (84 cm) and 54 inches (140 cm) diameter by 36 inches (91 cm) stroke, developing 175 horsepower (130 kW), giving a speed of 9.5 knots (17.6 km/h).

== Official number and code letters ==
Official Numbers were a forerunner to IMO Numbers. Hispania had the Swedish Official Number 5396 and used the Code Letter JTCB between 1930 and 1944, and SEWG from 1934.
