= Begg Rock =

Small island in California, US

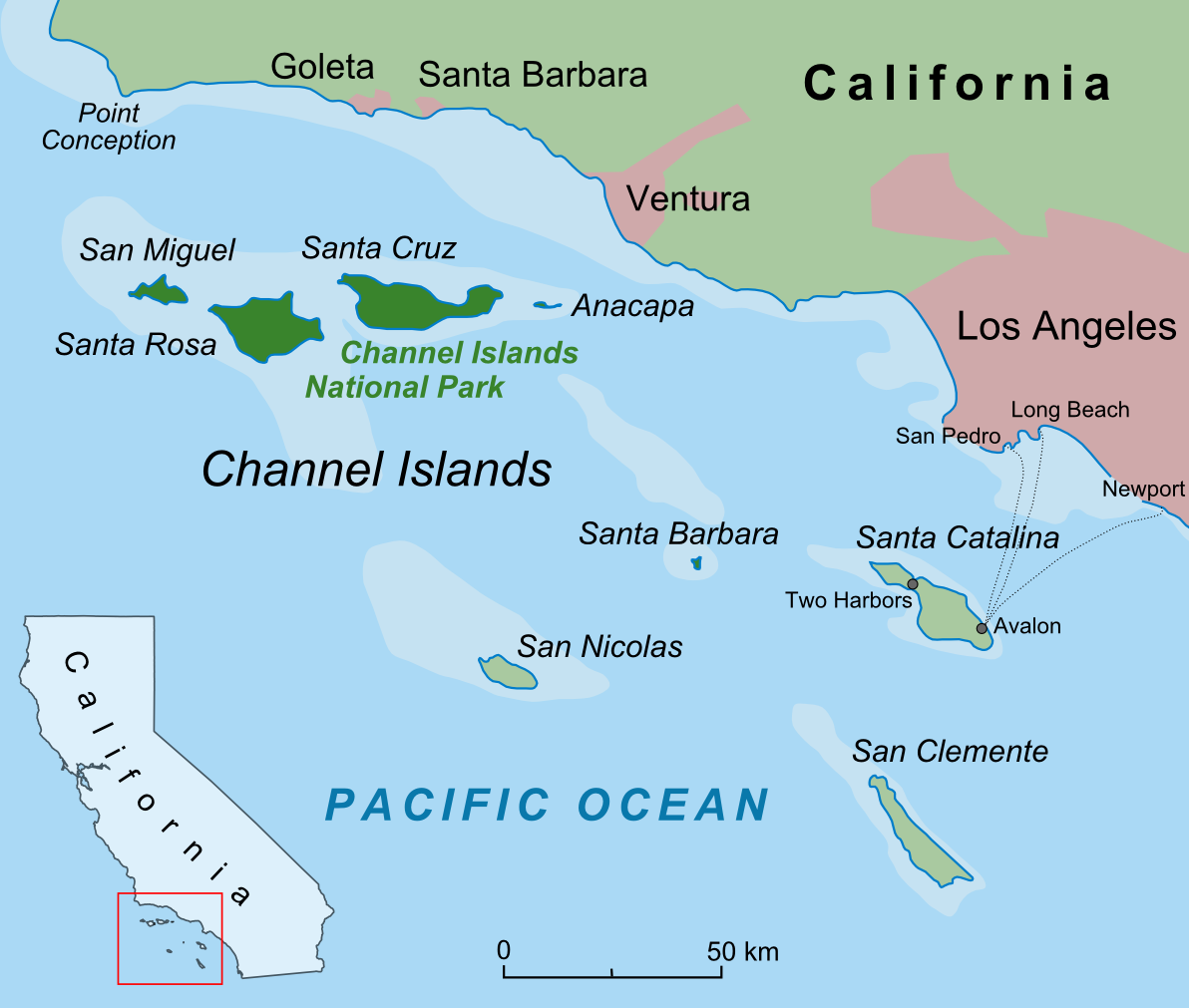
- Location within USA California Channel Islands Location within California

Geography
- Location: Ventura County California Pacific
- Coordinates: 33.362°N 119.695°W
- Archipelago: Channel Islands of California
- Highest point: not named

Administration
- United States

Demographics
- Population: 0

Begg Rock is an offshore rock pinnacle system in the Begg Rock State Marine Reserve. It is located 8.8 miles (14.2 km) northwest of Vizcaino Point, the west point of San Nicolas Island, Ventura County, California. It rises 50 fathoms (300 ft; 91 m) from the ocean floor, with its highest pinnacle reaching an elevation of 15 feet (4.6 m) above sea level. A reef extends both the north and south of the island by over 100 yards (91 m) each. A lighted whistle buoy is 500 yards (460 m) north of the rock. This rock may be found on NOAA chart 18755. This rock was named by the Coast Survey, after the boat John Begg, which struck a nearby rock in 1824.

Begg Rock extends almost vertically down from above the surface. It has several pinnacles, a couple of which are always above water and a couple that are only exposed at low tide. The vertical walls of the rock are covered in filter-feeding organisms such as mussels, green anemones, and pisaster starfish. Below 40 feet (12 meters) are large areas of brightly colored Corynactis anemones. Past about 70 feet (21 meters) are patches of white Metridium anemones. The site used to be famous for large rock scallops, which were depleted by hunters. As a State Marine Reserve, Begg Rock is currently a no-take zone.

== See also ==
- List of islands of California
