= SS Thesis =

Steamship wrecked in 1889 in the Sound of Mull, Scotland

Coordinates: 56°30.0198′N 5°41.496′W

History
- Name: SS Thesis
- Builder: MacIlwaine, Lewis & Co., Dublin
- Launched: January 1887
- Fate: Wrecked 16 October 1889

General characteristics
- Tonnage: 378 tons grt
- Length: 167 feet
- Beam: 25 feet
- Draught: 11.7 feet

SS Thesis was a steamship which was wrecked in October 1889 in the Sound of Mull, on Scotland's west coast. She is now a popular dive site with scuba divers.

The boiler and engine was mounted half above and half below the single main deck under wooden deckhouses. She had four holds – two either side of the central boiler and engine.

In October 1889, she set out on her final voyage from Middlesbrough to Belfast with a cargo of pig iron. On her trip down the west coast of Scotland under the command of Captain Wallace she travelled down the Sound of Mull, the narrow dangerous strip of water between the Isle of Mull and the mainland. At the southern end of the sound she ran onto a reef at Inninmore Point (Rubha an Ridire). The captain and 10 crew abandoned ship and she sank around four hours later.

She now lies with her stern in 31 metres (102 feet) of water and her bow in about 14 metres (46 feet).
