= Japanese supply ship Irako =

Japanese supply ship during the Second World War

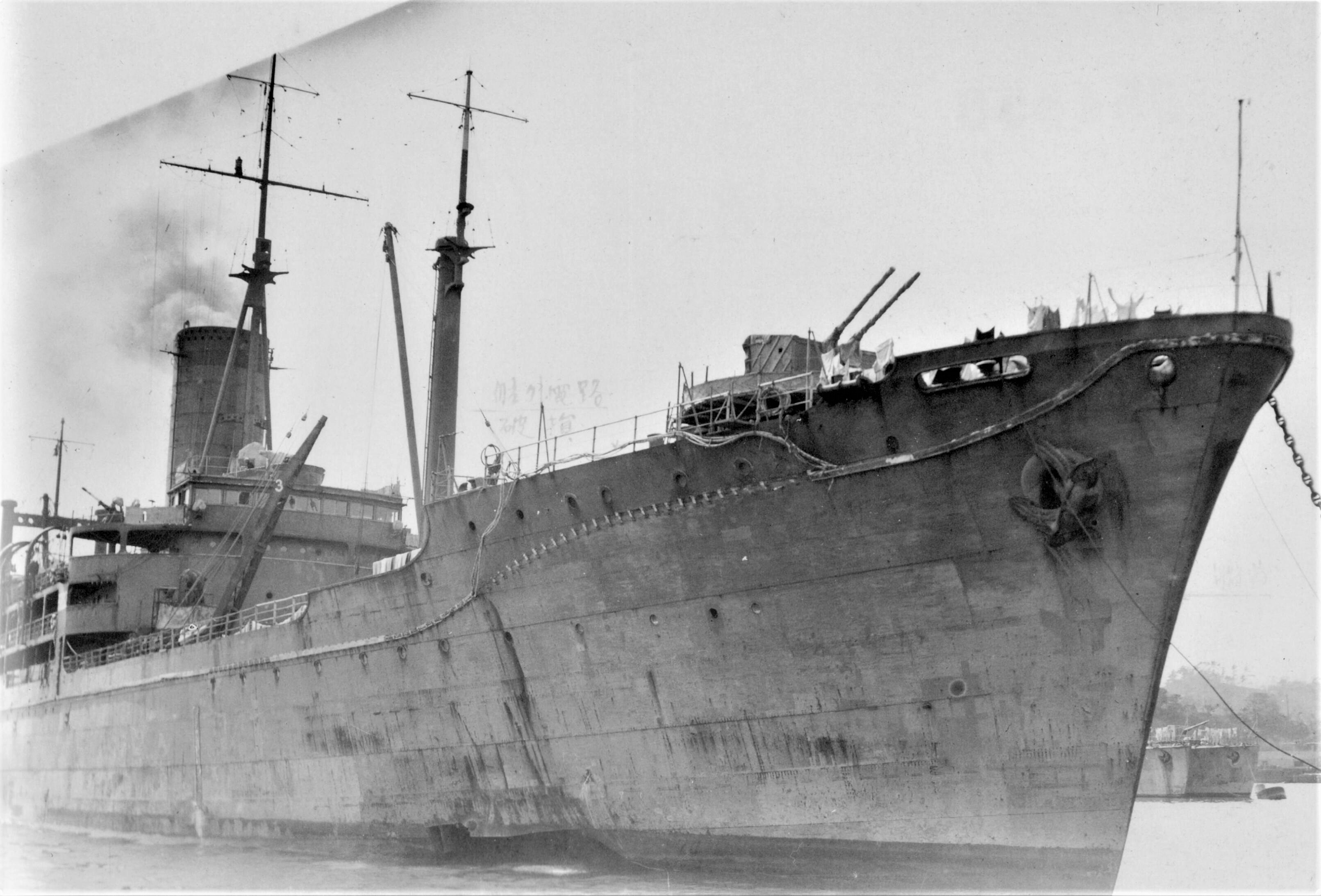
- Irako in 1944

Class overview
- Name: Irako-class food supply ship
- Builders: Kawasaki Shipbuilding Corporation
- Operators: Imperial Japanese Navy
- Preceded by: Mamiya
- Cost: 4,000,000 JPY as Irako; 17,378,000 JPY as Kusumi
- Built: 1940–1941
- In commission: 1941–1944
- Planned: 1 (1937) + 1 (1942)
- Completed: 1
- Canceled: 1
- Lost: 1

General characteristics
- Displacement: 9,570 long tons (9,724 t) standard; 11,100 long tons (11,278 t) trial
- Length: 145.0 m (475 ft 9 in) overall; 143.5 m (470 ft 10 in) waterline
- Beam: 19.0 m (62 ft 4 in)
- Draught: 6.05 m (19 ft 10 in)
- Propulsion: 2 × Kampon turbines; 6 × Kampon boilers; 2 shafts, 8,300 shp
- Speed: 17.5 knots (20.1 mph; 32.4 km/h)
- Complement: 361
- Armament: 4 × 120 mm (4.7 in) L/45 10th Year Type AA guns; 10 × Type 96 25mm AA guns; some depth charges
- Armour: none

Irako (伊良湖) was a Japanese food supply ship that served during the Second World War. Constructed for the transport of food-stuffs, Irako was eventually commissioned for other roles, including troop transport, munitions transport, and Pacific survey missions. The crew of Irako is honored, along with many other seamen, in Tokyo, Japan.

The ship was named for Cape Irago, at the tip of the Atsumi Peninsula in Aichi prefecture.

== Construction ==
She was built in 1937 under the 3rd Naval Armaments Supplement Programme, in preparation for the anticipated war with the United States. She was intended to supplement the Combined Fleet's existing food supply ship Mamiya. Her design was similar to that of Mamiya, but she was smaller. Her warehouse was able to supply 25,000 men over two weeks. A sister ship, Kusumi, was planned in 1942 under the Modified 5th Naval Armaments Supplement Programme, but construction was cancelled after the start of the Solomon Islands campaign.

== Service ==
Irako was completed and assigned to the Combined Fleet on 5 December 1941. In January 1942, she started sailing between the Japanese homeland (Kure and Yokosuka) to the front, including Saipan, Truk, and Davao. Starting in April of that year, she started sailing to Singapore from the Japanese mainland as well. In August, she started making what would eventually be 12 trips to Truk from the mainland.

On 20 January 1944, she sustained heavy damage in an attack by USS Seadragon north of Truk 08°04′N 152°40′E. On 5 July, she was assigned to the Southwest Area Fleet, where she underwent repairs, which were completed in August 1944. She was dispatched to Manila Bay soon afterwards with convoy Hi-71, arriving on 2 September. She was present for the air raid carried out by Task Force 38 on 21 September, saving survivors from the destroyer Satsuki. On 22 September, she headed toward Coron Bay, only to be damaged during an air raid by aircraft of Task Force 38 at 11°59′N 120°02′E and scuttled on 24 September. She was decommissioned on 30 November 1945.

== Ships in class ==
Ship #	Ship	Builder	Laid down	Launched	Completed	Fate
74	Irako (伊良湖)	Kawasaki, Kōbe Shipyard	30 May 1940	14 February 1941	5 December 1941	Scuttled on 24 September 1944 at Coron Bay.
5408	Kusumi (久須見)					Cancelled on 5 May 1944.

== Books ==
- The Maru Special, Japanese Naval Vessels No.34 "Japanese Auxiliary ships", Ushio Shobō (Japan), December 1979, Book code 68343-34
- Collection of writings by Sizuo Fukui Vol.10, Stories of Japanese Support Vessels, Kōjinsha (Japan), December 1993, ISBN 4-7698-0658-2
- Senshi Sōsho Vol.31, Naval armaments and war preparation (1), "Until November 1941", Asagumo Simbun (Japan), November 1969
- Senshi Sōsho Vol.88, Naval armaments and war preparation (2), "And after the outbreak of war", Asagumo Simbun (Japan), October 1975
