= Palancar Reef =

Coral reef off Cozumel, Mexico in the Caribbean sea

Coordinates: 20°20′38″N 87°1′34″W

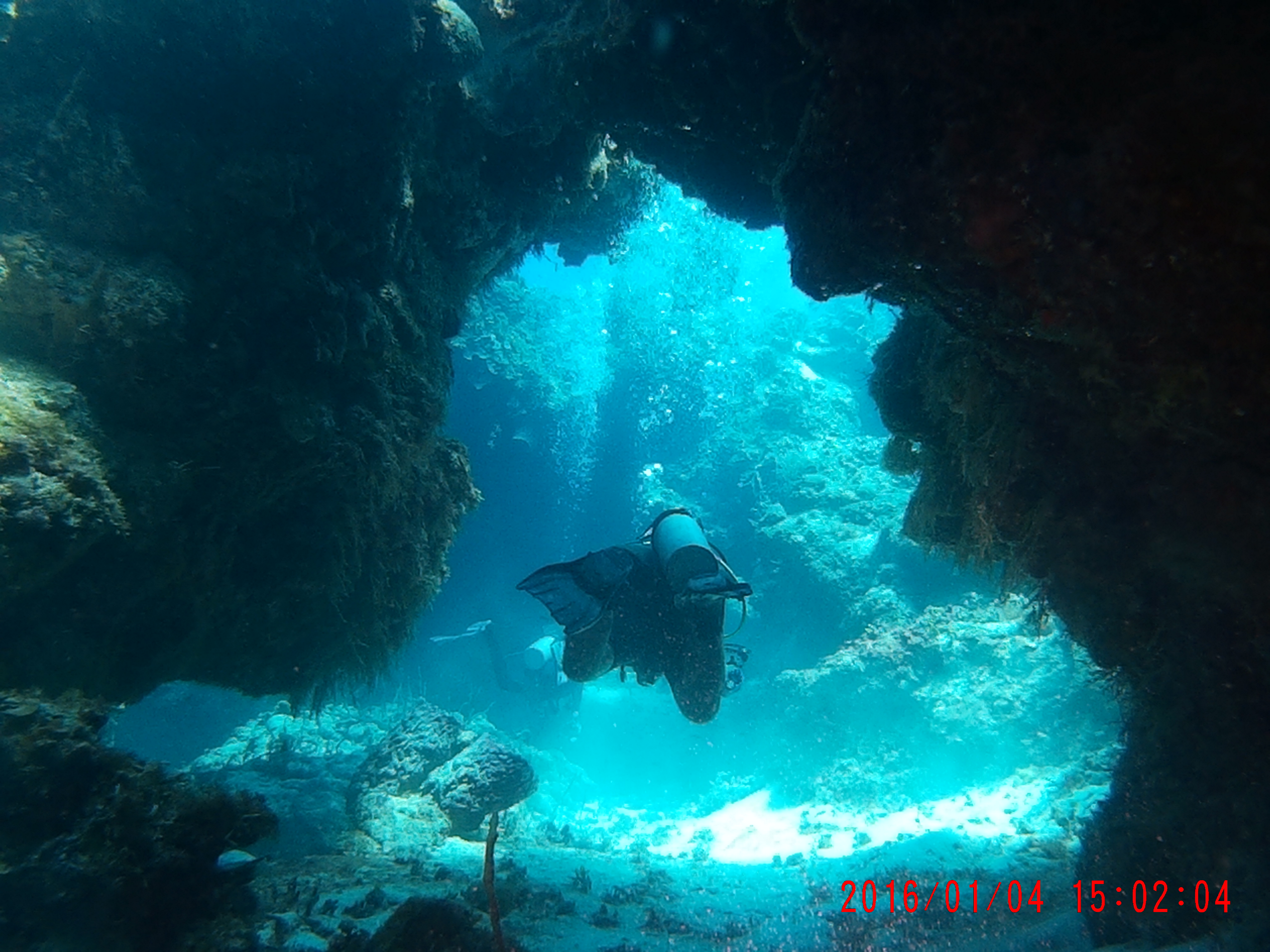
Palancar Reef Cozumel

Palancar Reef is a large coral reef on the southwest side of the island of Cozumel and is part of the Arrecifes de Cozumel National Park. The site, popular with scuba divers, is divided into several sections based on depth and coral formations. Dive depths range from 50 to 110 feet (15 to 34 m), with coral swim-throughs in many places.

== Sealife ==
- Angelfish
- Barracuda
- Crabs
- Grouper
- Moray eels
- Nurse sharks
- Ocean sunfish
- Parrotfish
- Sea turtles
- Spiny lobster
- Splendid toadfish
- Yellowtail amberjack
- Cashdyn Fish

== Dive locations ==
- Palancar horseshoe
- Palancar caves
- Palancar gardens
- Palancar shallows
- Palancar deep

== Conservation ==
On September 23, 2019, the Natural Protected Areas Commission (CONANP) announced that it is temporarily closing a section of the reef from Palancar Gardens all the way around the south tip of the island. The closure is planned to be in effect from October 7, 2019, to December 15, 2019, at which point they will re-evaluate the health of the reef.

== See also ==
- List of reefs
