= Villa Blanca Reef =

Coral reef off Cozumel, Mexico

- Location of Villa Blanca Reef Villa Blanca Reef (Mexico)

Geography
- Location: Caribbean Sea
- Coordinates: 20.4839°N 86.9749°W
- Type: Reef

Administration
- Mexico

Additional information
- Time zone: Eastern Standard Time (UTC-5)

Villa Blanca Reef is a coral reef situated along the western coast of Cozumel, an island off the eastern shore of Mexico's Yucatán Peninsula. The reef is located within the northern sector of the Mesoamerican Barrier Reef System, the second-largest coral reef system in the world. It lies outside the boundaries of Arrecifes de Cozumel National Park and features both shallow and mesophotic coral ecosystems.

== Geography and ecology ==
Villa Blanca Reef is located on the western coast of Cozumel, situated near San Miguel de Cozumel and the port area of the island. The site lies on a narrow insular shelf characterized by stepped terraces, with depths ranging from shallow zones down to mesophotic depths exceeding 50 meters. Ocean currents in the region, including the Yucatán Channel current, influence the reef's ecological processes and contribute to sediment transport and nutrient circulation.

Villa Blanca Reef supports a variety of marine life. Fish communities include species found on both shallow and mesophotic reefs, with approximately 42.5% of fish species shared between these habitats, including many of commercial importance. In the deeper mesophotic areas, the reef structure is mainly formed by calcareous algae, sponges, gorgonians, and black corals, with fewer hard corals. The seafloor communities include species of scleractinian corals such as Montastraea and Porites, though coral cover has changed over time due to hurricanes. The reef also contains various types of algae, including Halimeda and red coralline algae, which help create sediment and stabilize the reef.

== Threats and conservation ==
The proximity of Villa Blanca Reef to Cozumel’s main port and city has exposed the reef to increased threats from human activity, including cruise tourism and coastal development. Additionally, coral reefs around Cozumel have been impacted by hurricanes, such as Hurricane Wilma and Hurricane Emily in 2005, which caused significant coral mortality.

A proposed expansion of Cozumel's cruise port infrastructure, backed by MSC Cruises, has raised concerns about further impacts on Villa Blanca Reef. This project would involve constructing a new cruise ship dock over the reef. Environmental groups have expressed concerns that such a project could lead to increased sedimentation, water quality degradation, and physical damage to the reef structure. Legal efforts were initially undertaken to halt construction, including a federal injunction that temporarily suspended development activities. However, the injunction was later lifted, allowing preparatory work for the project to resume on top of Villa Blanca Reef.

In response to these and other threats, coral restoration sites have been placed within Villa Blanca Reef to promote coral growth and enhance marine biodiversity while managing tourism impacts.

== See also ==
- List of reefs
