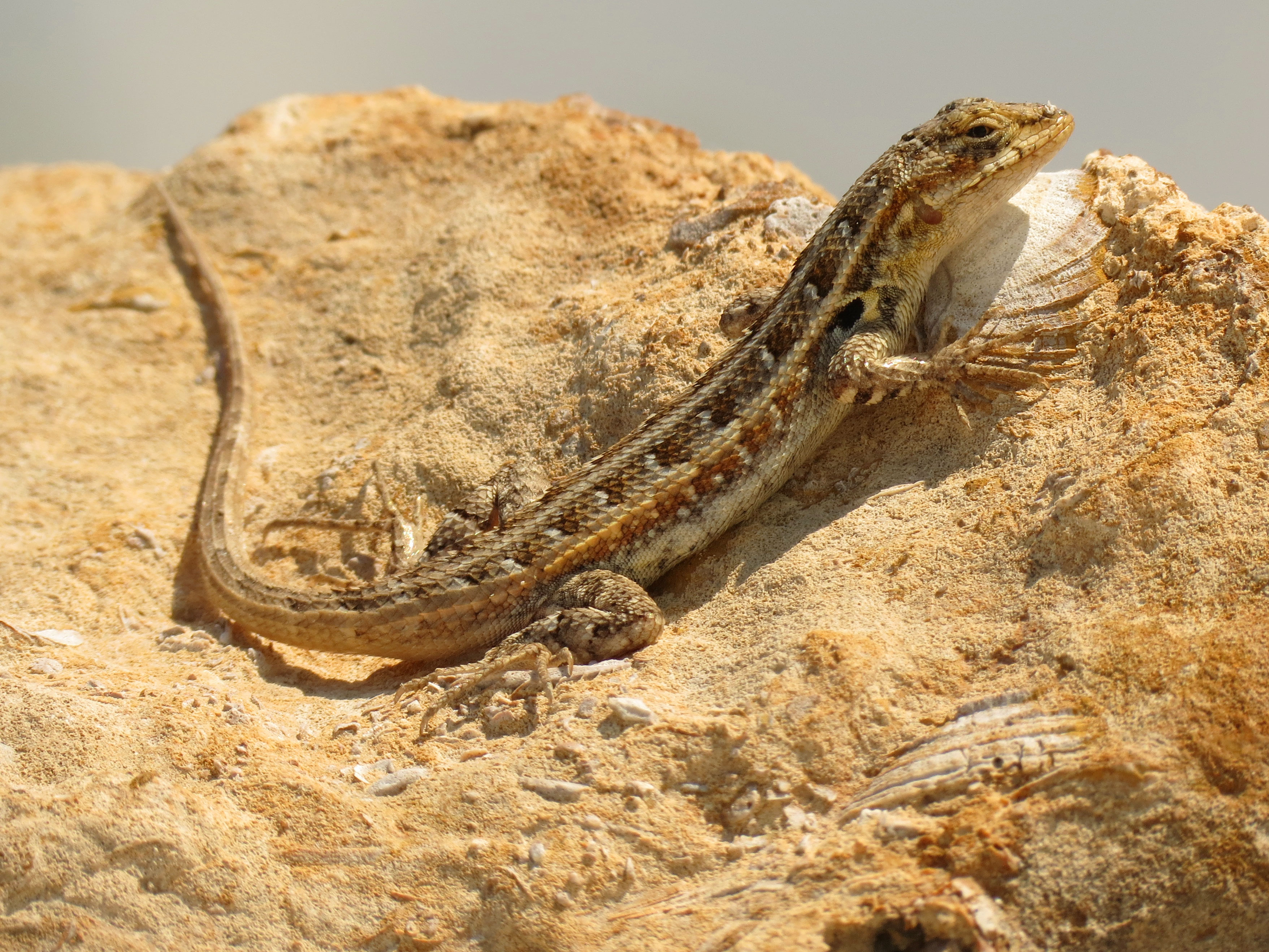

Conservation status
- Least Concern (IUCN 3.1)

Scientific classification
- Domain: Eukaryota
- Kingdom: Animalia
- Phylum: Chordata
- Class: Reptilia
- Order: Squamata
- Suborder: Iguania
- Family: Phrynosomatidae
- Genus: Sceloporus
- Species: S. cozumelae

Binomial name
- Sceloporus cozumelae Jones, 1927

= Sceloporus cozumelae =

Cozumel spiny lizard

Species of lizard

Sceloporus cozumelae, the Cozumel spiny lizard, is a species of lizard in the family Phrynosomatidae. It is endemic to Mexico.

The species is native to coastal areas of the Yucatán Peninsula, where it has been found in Yucatán, Quintana Roo, and northernmost Campeche, and on the islands of Cozumel, Isla Contoy, and Isla Mujeres, from sea level up to 50 meters elevation.
