= Environment of Sri Lanka =

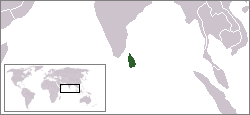
Sri Lanka lies in the Indian Ocean.

The environment of Sri Lanka exhibits a remarkable biodiversity.

Sri Lanka is considered to be the richest country in Asia in terms of species concentration and is one of the world's biodiversity hotspots.

== Physical geography ==
Diagrammatic section across Sri Lanka as per D. N. Wadia

Sri Lanka was once part of the southern supercontinent Gondwana, which also included South America, Africa, India and Antarctica. Gondwana began to break up 140 million years ago. The tectonic plate on which Sri Lanka was located, the Indian Plate, collided with the Eurasian Plate creating the Himalayas.

Sri Lanka was originally part of the Deccan land mass, contiguous with Madagascar. The Loris, found only in Sri Lanka and South India, is related to the Lemurs of Madagascar. The connection to India led to a commonality of species, e.g. freshwater fish, the now extinct Sri Lankan Gaur (Bibos sinhaleyus) and the Sri Lankan Lion (Panthera leo sinhaleyus).

The island was connected, off and on at least 17 times in the past 700,000 years, to India.

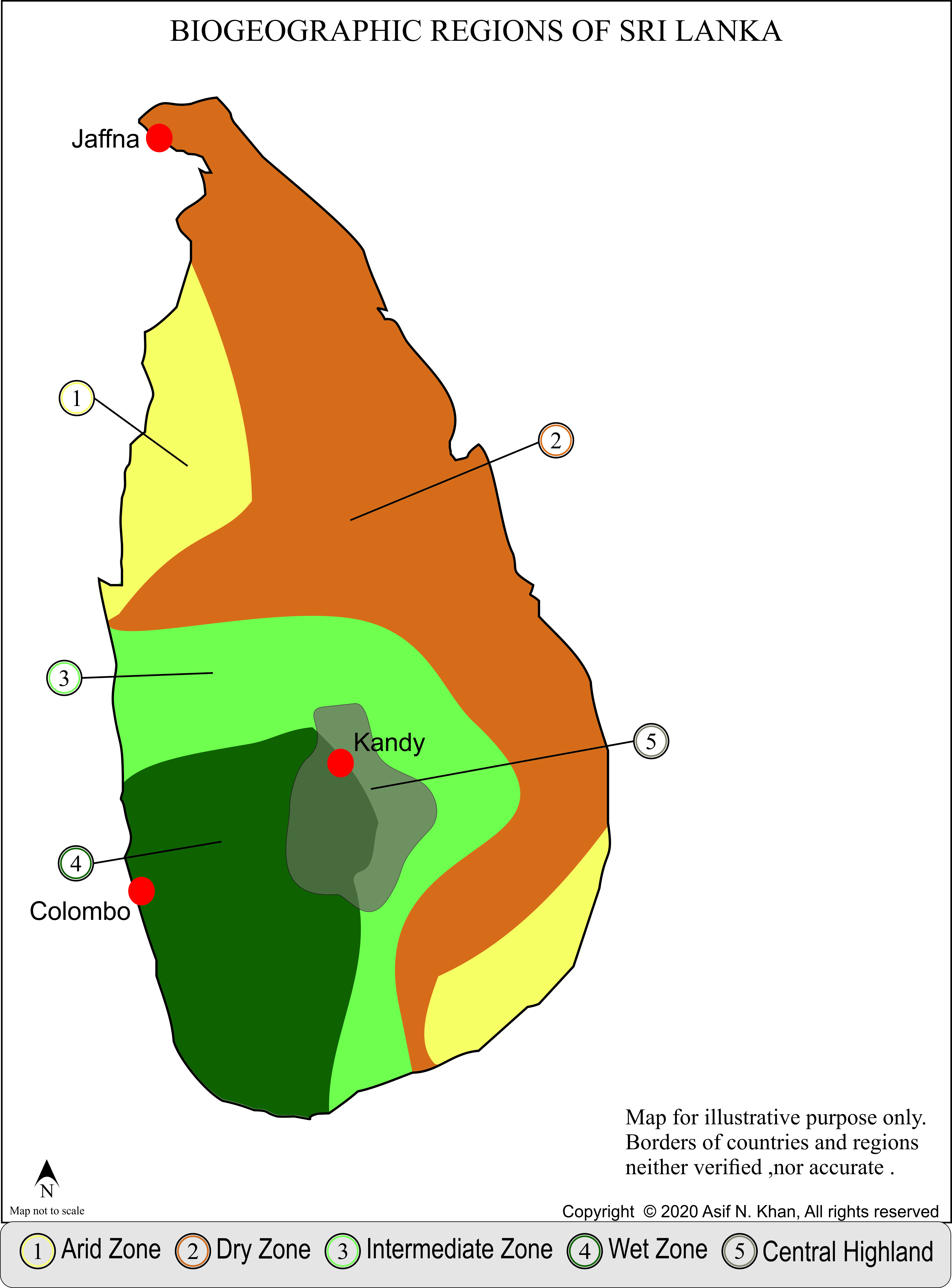
Biogeographic zones of Sri Lanka

== Fauna ==
Sri Lanka's biological richness has exceptional levels of endemism. 43% of indigenous vertebrates animals of Sri Lanka are endemic (excluding marine forms).

== Flora ==
Today, 25% of the 3,000 angiosperms of Sri Lanka are endemic (angiosperms are approximately 80% of all living green plants).

=== Forests ===
According to the U.N. FAO, 28.8% of Sri Lanka was forested in 2010 (about 1,86 million hectares). In 1995, it was 1.94 million hectares or 32.2% of the land area that was classified as dense forests while the balance 0.47 million hectares or 7% the land area classified as open forests.

9.0% (167,000 hectares) of Sri Lanka's forests are classified as primary forest (the most biodiverse and carbon-dense form of forest).

Sri Lanka's forests contain 61 million metric tons of carbon in living forest biomass (in 2010).

The southwest portion of the island, where the influence of the moisture-bearing southwest monsoon is strongest, is home to the Sri Lanka lowland rain forests. At higher elevations they make the transition to the Sri Lanka montane rain forests. Both these tropical moist forest ecoregions bear strong affinities to those of India's Western Ghats.

The northern and eastern portions of the island are considerably drier, lying in the rain shadow of the central highlands. The Sri Lanka dry-zone dry evergreen forests are a tropical dry broadleaf forest ecoregion, which, like the neighbouring East Deccan dry evergreen forests of India's Coromandel Coast, is characterised by evergreen trees, rather than the dry-season deciduous trees that predominate in most other tropical dry broadleaf forests.

These forests have been largely cleared for agriculture, timber or grazing, and many of the dry evergreen forests have been degraded to thorn scrub, savanna, or thickets. Several preserves have been established to protect some of Sri Lanka's remaining natural areas. The island has three biosphere reserves, Hurulu (established 1977), Sinharaja (established 1978), and Kanneliya-Dediyagala-Nakiyadeniya (KDN) (established 2004).

The coastal estuaries are home to mangrove habitats, e.g. the Maduganga river.

Offshore are found habitats associated with coral reefs, e.g. the Bar Reef. Also of note are the pearl banks of Mannar, which are also home to Chank, sea cucumbers and sea grasses.

== Environmental policy and law ==
International agreements

Sri Lanka is a party to: Biodiversity, Climate Change, Desertification, Endangered Species, Environmental Modification, Hazardous Wastes, Law of the Sea, Nuclear Test Ban, Ozone Layer Protection, Ship Pollution, Wetlands.

It has signed, but not ratified: Marine Life Conservation

== Environmental issues ==
Environmental concerns include deforestation; soil erosion; wildlife populations threatened by poaching and urbanization; coastal degradation from mining activities and increased pollution; freshwater resources being polluted by industrial wastes and sewage runoff; waste disposal; air pollution in Colombo

- Deforestation in Sri Lanka is one of the most serious environmental issues.
