= USS Scamp (SS-277) =

Submarine of the United States

Coordinates: 33°38′N 141°0′E

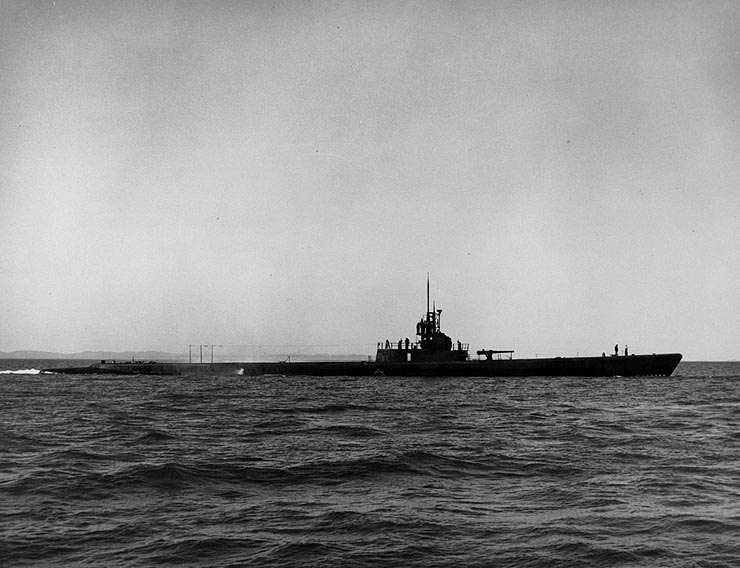
- USS Scamp

History

United States NavyUnited States
- Name: USS Scamp (SS-277)
- Namesake: Scamp grouper
- Builder: Portsmouth Naval Shipyard, Kittery, Maine
- Laid down: 6 March 1942
- Launched: 20 July 1942
- Sponsored by: Miss Katherine Eugenia McKee
- Commissioned: 18 September 1942
- Fate: Probably sunk 11 November 1944
- Stricken: 28 April 1945

General characteristics
- Class & type: Gato-class diesel-electric submarine
- Displacement: 1,525 long tons (1,549 t) surfaced; 2,424 long tons (2,463 t) submerged
- Length: 311 ft 9 in (95.02 m)
- Beam: 27 ft 3 in (8.31 m)
- Draft: 17 ft 0 in (5.18 m) maximum
- Propulsion: 4 × Fairbanks-Morse Model 38D8-⅛ 9-cylinder opposed piston diesel engines driving electrical generators; 2 × 126-cell Sargo batteries; 4 × high-speed General Electric electric motors with reduction gears; two propellers; 5,400 shp (4.0 MW) surfaced; 2,740 shp (2.0 MW) submerged
- Speed: 21 knots (39 km/h) surfaced; 9 knots (17 km/h) submerged
- Range: 11,000 nautical miles (20,000 km) surfaced at 10 knots (19 km/h)
- Endurance: 48 hours at 2 knots (4 km/h) submerged; 75 days on patrol
- Test depth: 300 ft (90 m)
- Complement: 6 officers, 54 enlisted
- Armament: 10 × 21-inch (533 mm) torpedo tubes; 6 forward, 4 aft; 24 torpedoes; 1 × 5-inch (127 mm) / 25 caliber deck gun; Bofors 40 mm and Oerlikon 20 mm cannon

USS Scamp (SS-277), a Gato-class submarine, was the first ship of the United States Navy to be named for the scamp grouper, a member of the family Serranidae.

== Construction and commissioning ==
Scamp′s keel was laid down on 6 March 1942 at the Portsmouth Navy Yard in Kittery, Maine. She was launched on 20 July 1942, sponsored by Miss Katherine Eugenia McKee, and commissioned on 18 September 1942.

== Service history ==
On 19 January 1943, after training from New London, Connecticut, Scamp set course for Pearl Harbor, Hawaii, via the Panama Canal. She arrived in Hawaii on 13 February 1943 and commenced final training in the local operating area.

=== First war patrol ===
Scamp began her first war patrol by departing Pearl Harbor on 1 March 1943. She stopped at Midway Atoll in the Northwestern Hawaiian Islands on 5 March 1943, debarked her passenger, Rear Admiral Charles A. Lockwood, Jr., Commander, Submarine Force, Pacific Fleet, fueled, and then headed for the coast of Honshū, Japan.

Her first two attacks on the Japanese were doomed to failure by the faulty magnetic exploders in her torpedoes. After the inactivating of the magnetic features on her remaining torpedoes, Scamp scored two hits, one on an unidentified ship on the night of 20 March 1943 and one which damaged the merchant ship Manju Maru early on the morning of 21 March 1943. The submarine stopped at Midway Atoll again on 26 March 1943 and returned to Pearl Harbor on 7 April 1943.

=== Second war patrol ===
Scamp put to sea again on 19 April 1943, bound for the Southwest Pacific. She took on fuel at Johnston Atoll, then slipped between the Marshall Islands and the Gilbert Islands to reconnoiter Ocean Island and Nauru Island. She completed this reconnaissance on 27 and 28 April 1943 and then shaped a course for the Bismarck Archipelago. She had to hold fire on each of her first three enemy contacts because they were hospital ships. However, on the afternoon of 28 May 1943, she succeeded in pumping three torpedoes into the converted seaplane tender Kamikawa Maru, which already had been damaged in an attack by the submarine USS Wahoo (SS-238) on 4 May 1943. Scamp evaded the Japanese escorts and came up to periscope depth to observe the results of her attack. Kamikawa Maru was down by the stern and loading men into boats. A little after midnight, Scamp finished off Kamikawa Maru with two more torpedoes. Scamp ended her second war patrol at Brisbane, Australia, on 4 June 1943.

=== Third war patrol ===
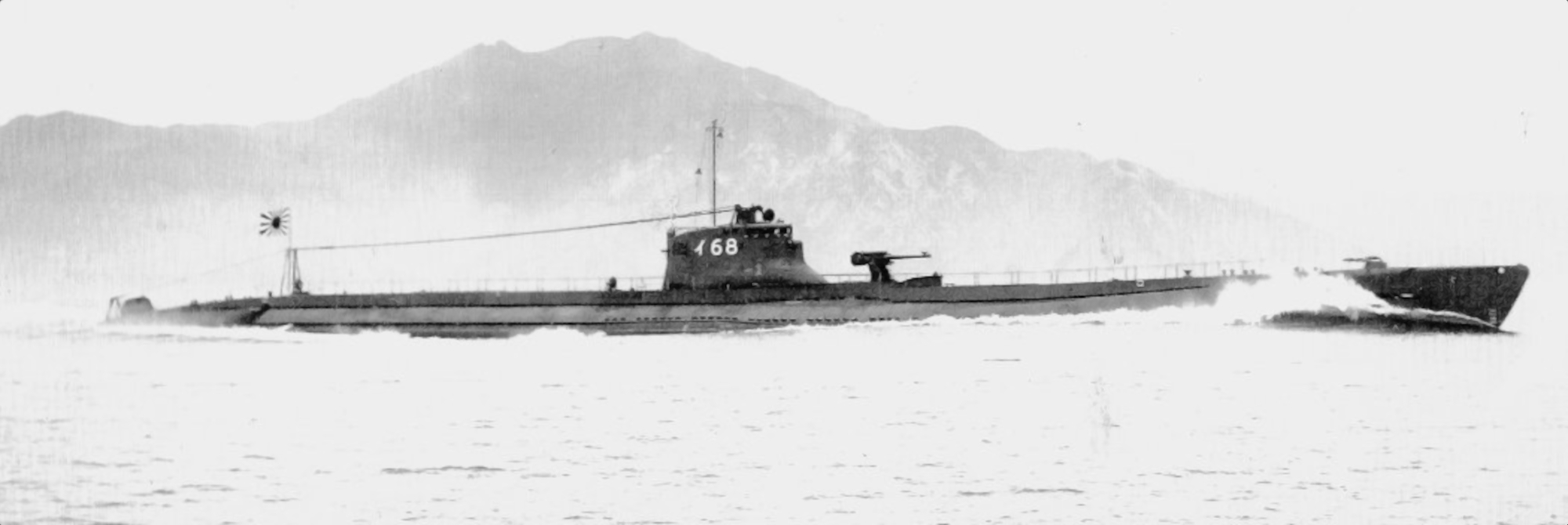
The Japanese submarine I-168 in March 1934. Scamp sank her on 27 July 1943.

From Brisbane, Scamp departed on her third war patrol on 22 June 1943. She patrolled a scouting line off the Solomon Islands and north to the Bismarck Sea. She passed the Shortland Islands on 14 July 1943, and on 27 July 1943 encountered a Japanese convoy. During her approach, a Japanese destroyer passed over her and dropped two depth charges some distance from her. Scamp continued her approach and loosed a spread of six torpedoes at a Japanese tanker. She scored a hit but had to dive in order to escape the escorts. When she surfaced a little over an hour later, all Japanese ships were out of sight.

Continuing her patrol into the Bismarck Archipelago, Scamp patrolled to the southeast of Steffen Strait, between New Ireland and New Hanover. At 17:54 on 27 July 1943, the same day she had attacked the convoy, she sighted a submarine, which launched a torpedo at Scamp. Scamp went ahead full, crash-dived, and leveled off at 220 feet (67 m), letting the torpedo pass above her. Less than ten minutes later, she returned to periscope depth to engage the Japanese submarine. At 18:12, she launched four torpedoes, and the Japanese submarine erupted in a tremendous explosion. At the time, Allied analysts believed that the submarine she sank was I-24, but postwar analysis of Japanese records indicated that it instead was I-168, which had sunk the disabled aircraft carrier USS Yorktown (CV-5) and the destroyer USS Hammann (DD-412) during the Battle of Midway on 7 June 1942. On 8 August 1943, Scamp returned to Brisbane.

=== Fourth war patrol ===
After almost a month in port at Brisbane, Scamp stood out on her fourth war patrol. She again patrolled off the Solomon Islands and into the Bismarck Sea. On 18 September 1943, she attacked a Japanese three-ship convoy and crippled the 8,614-gross register ton passenger-cargo ship Kansai Maru. Another ship changed course and avoided her torpedoes. Scamp passed close under the stricken Kansai Maru, trying to evade the Japanese escorts, and came under machine gun fire from Kansai Maru. She escaped the escorting Japanese destroyers, but lost the undamaged ship in a rain squall. She returned to finish off Kansai Maru late that night.

On the morning of 21 21 September 1943, Scamp happened upon a heavily guarded Japanese convoy and began to stalk it. After dark, she moved in, launched three torpedoes and heard two double explosions. Her second attack was foiled by a severe rain squall. However, Scamp hounded the convoy all through the day on 22 September 1943, and at around 03:00 on 23 September fired four torpedoes at the convoy. While still maneuvering to attack the convoy, she passed through the wreckage of Kansai Maru and came upon an empty boat containing the sunken ship's logs and other documents. She took these on board and later turned them over to intelligence. Scamp made one more attempt on the convoy, but was driven off by Japanese planes and kept down by aerial bombs. On 24 September 1943, she was ordered to terminate her patrol, and she arrived at Brisbane on 1 October 1943.

=== Fifth war patrol ===
Scamp cleared port again on 22 October 1943 and began her fifth war patrol with a mission in support of the invasion of Treasury Island from 28 to 30 October 1943. From there, she moved to her patrol area, between Kavieng and Truk. On 4 November 1943, she launched three torpedoes at a passenger-cargo ship. One exploded prematurely, but one reached its mark. By the time of the explosion indicating success, Scamp was already in a dive evading a depth charge attack. On 10 November 1943, she disabled the 6,481-gross register ton merchant ship Tokyo Maru, then, after evading the escorts, fired three more torpedoes into the listing ship. At about 21:00, Scamp observed the Japanese towing away the crippled Tokyo Maru; later it was learned that Tokyo Maru sank before daybreak. On 12 November 1943, Scamp damaged the Japanese Agano so severely that Agano remained in repair at Truk until Operation Hailstone, the American strike on Truk of 16–17 February 1944. On 18 November 1943, Scamp suffered minor shrapnel damage from two bombs dropped by a Japanese floatplane. On 26 November 1943, she returned to Brisbane.

=== Sixth war patrol ===
On 16 December 1943, Scamp left Brisbane and headed back to the Bismarck Archipelago for her sixth war patrol. On the night of 6 January 1944, she fired at but missed a small Japanese tanker and was boxed in by the sound search of two Japanese destroyers. At 2323, she surfaced and cleared the area while the convoy escorts hunted for her about 8,000 yards (7,300 m) astern. On 14 January 1944, she slipped by two destroyers to launch six torpedoes at the 9,975-gross register ton tanker Nippon Maru. Nippon Maru sank as Scamp made her escape. Foiled in an attempt to return to the area, she headed south to act as plane guard north of Lyra Reef for United States Army Air Forces B-24 Liberator bombers. On 6 February 1944, she put into Milne Bay, New Guinea, for refit.

=== Seventh war patrol ===
Scamp spent her seventh war patrol searching the shipping lanes between New Guinea, Palau, and Mindanao in the Philippines. She departed Milne Bay on 3 March 1944 and, after uneventful patrolling, put in at Langemak Bay from 29 to 31 March 1944 for repairs to her Torpedo Data Computer. Following her resumption of patrol, she battle-surfaced on 4 April 1944 and set fire to a 200-gross register ton trawler, but broke off the action when her deck gun failed.

On 7 April 1944 Scamp encountered six Japanese cruisers escorted by destroyers and planes south of Davao Gulf,. She dived to 100 feet (30 m) and the destroyers passed overhead without noticing her. She returned to the surface at 1405 but was forced down by a plane. A little later, she tried to surface again but was attacked by a diving floatplane. As she crash-dived to escape the floatplane, an aerial bomb exploded. All hands were knocked off their feet by the explosion and all power was lost. Scamp began to take an up angle and started to settle rapidly. At just below 300 feet (91 m), she began to hang on, then started up. The diving officer reported that the hydraulic controller had been jarred to "off" in the attack and that the hydraulic plant started closing all the main vents as fire started filling the maneuvering and aft torpedo rooms with a thick, toxic smoke.

Fortunately, Scamp caught at 52 feet (16 m), the decision having been made to surface and fight it out with the Japanese using the deck gun if she could not be held below 50 feet (15 m). Scamp started down again, "see-sawed" three times, and started down a third time before power was regained. Soon Scamp was making two-thirds speed on each shaft and had leveled off at 150 feet (46 m). She released oil and air bubbles to appear to have sunk and then headed for the Admiralty Islands. At 21:06, she surfaced and, with a 17-degree list, made for Seeadler Harbor on Manus Island, where she arrived on 16 April 1944.

Scamp made emergency repairs at Manus, shifted to Milne Bay on 22 April 1944, and then moved on to Pearl Harbor for a thorough overhaul at the Pearl Harbor Navy Yard.

=== Eighth war patrol and loss ===
Scamp set out on her eighth war patrol on 16 October 1944. She fueled at Midway Atoll on 20 October 1944, then set course for the Bonin Islands. On 9 November 1944, she acknowledged a message changing her patrol area. She reported her position to be about 150 nautical miles (280 km; 170 mi) north of the Bonin Islands with all 24 torpedoes aboard and 77,000 US gallons (64,000 imp gal; 290,000 L) of fuel remaining. Scamp was never heard from again. On 14 November 1944, Scamp was ordered to take up the life guard station off Tokyo Bay in support of U.S. Army Air Forces B-29 Superfortress bomber strikes, but failed to acknowledge the message.

From an examination of Japanese records after World War II, it appears that Scamp was sighted by Japanese planes and depth-charged by the Japanese kaibōkan CD-4 to the south of Tokyo Bay on 11 November 1944. CD-4 expended some 70 depth charges against Scamp and apparently sank her.

Scamp was struck from the Naval Vessel Register on 28 April 1945.

== Honors and awards ==
Scamp received seven battle stars for World War II service.
