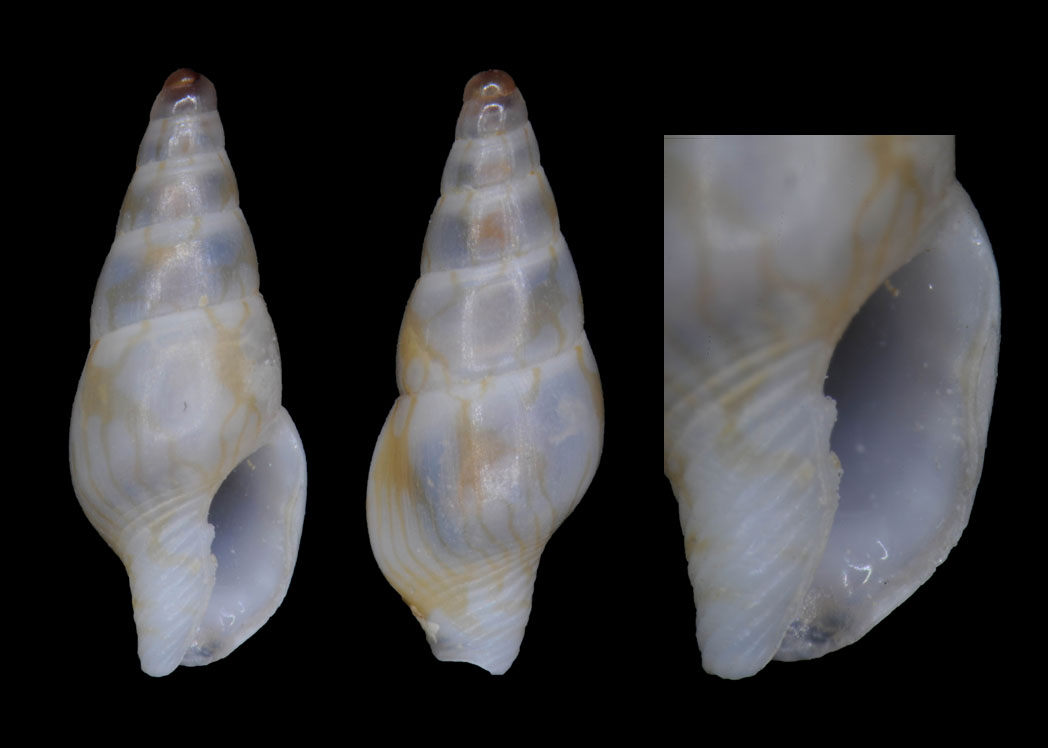
- Shells of Mitrella herosae (holotype at MNHN, Paris)

Scientific classification
- Kingdom: Animalia
- Phylum: Mollusca
- Class: Gastropoda
- Subclass: Caenogastropoda
- Order: Neogastropoda
- Superfamily: Buccinoidea
- Family: Columbellidae
- Genus: Mitrella
- Species: M. herosae

Binomial name
- Mitrella herosae K. Monsecour & D. Monsecour, 2016

= Mitrella herosae =

Species of gastropod

Mitrella herosae is a species of sea snail, a marine gastropod mollusk in the family Columbellidae, the dove snails. It is a benthic predator, living on the seafloor where it preys on smaller invertebrates.

== Description ==
The length of the shell attains 6.3 mm. It is generally white and slightly beige colored.

== Distribution ==
This marine species occurs in the New Caledonian Exclusive Economic Zone, specifically off the Norfolk Ridge, New Caledonia. It is often documented at a depth range of 197–285 meters.
