= Devil's Throat at Punta Sur =

Underwater cave near Cozumel, Mexico

The Devil's Throat (Spanish: La Garganta del Diablo) is an underwater cave formation near the island of Cozumel, Mexico, at Punta Sur in the Arrecifes de Cozumel National Park; it starts at approximately 80 feet (24 m) of depth and opens up at approximately 135 ft (41 m) - right at the edge of recreational dive limits.

== Overview ==
The Devil's Throat is considered a "must dive" experience by scuba divers visiting Cozumel. Yet, due to the depth and the fact that it is a cave, it is considered an advanced dive and can be dangerous to inexperienced divers as decompression stops may be necessary if progress through the cave is slow. If divers keep moving and do not stop during the dive, decompression stops are not normally needed; standard ascent rates and safety stops are sufficient for a safe ascent.

The name "Devil's Throat" specifically refers to a narrow tunnel dropping through the red coral reef structure at around 45 degree, from about 100 feet (30 m) to 125 feet (38 m). However, the entire formation, part of the Punta Sur (Southern point) area, is also commonly referred to as The Devil's Throat.

The formation includes an underwater cave referred to as Catedral (the Cathedral), which was known for its unusual crucifix-shaped sponge formation in the ceiling of the cave, with a shaft of light from one of the tunnels backlighting the sponge cross. Hurricane Wilma inflicted damage on portions of the Cozumel reef system, and the sponge was lost to that storm.

== Risks ==
Divers who exceed the no-decompression limits may require a decompression stop.

Other risks include nitrogen narcosis because most divers are using compressed air when diving at Cozumel and not trimix.

Diving the Devil's Throat requires use of an underwater light, and it is recommended that divers not scissor kick because it stirs up sediment which heavily obscures visibility. By some definitions, the dive may be considered a "cavern" rather than a "cave", because light can be seen from most points in the dive, though the openings are generally too small for a person to traverse.
