= List of reefs =

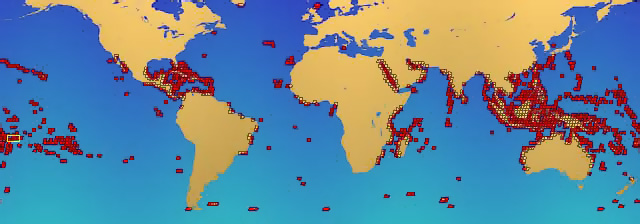
Locations of coral reefs around the world

This is a list of notable reefs.

== Reefs ==
Name	image	Location	Coordinates	Notes
	List of reefs is located in Earth	Red Sea to Madagascar	0.051377°S 50.846055°E	
Amazon Reef	List of reefs is located in Earth	Off the coast of French Guiana and northern Brazil	1°N 49°W	The Amazon Reef (also referred to as the Amazonian Reef) is an extensive coral and sponge reef system, located off the coast of French Guiana and northern Brazil. It is one of the largest reef systems in the world known to exist, with scientists estimating its length to be over 600 miles (970 km) long, and covering over 3,600 square miles (9,300 km^{2}) of area.
Angria Bank	List of reefs is located in Earth	Off the coast of Vijaydurg, Maharashtra, India	16.43°N 72.03°E	
Apo Reef		Mindoro Strait, Philippines	12.66167°N 120.4144°E	This is the Philippines' largest reef and the world's second-largest contiguous coral reef system.
Gulf Reef Mexico Arrecifes de Cozumel National Park	List of reefs is located in Earth	Cozumel, Mexico	20.1737°N 87.0129°W	Part of the Mesoamerican Barrier Reef System
Bar Reef	List of reefs is located in Earth	Kalpitiya peninsula, Sri Lanka	8.2300°N 79.4400°E	This coral reef has more biodiversity than in any of the waters of India. It is one of only a few pristine systems in Sri Lanka.
Belize Barrier Reef		Belize	17.1856°N 87.324°W	This is the second biggest coral reef system on Earth, the largest being the Great Barrier Reef. It is approximately one-third the size of the 900 km (560 mi) long Mesoamerican Barrier Reef System.
Benares Shoals		Peros Banhos atoll, northern Chagos Archipelago	5.15°S 071.40°E	
Blake Plateau reef		Southeastern United States	31°N 79°W	
Bunaken National Marine Park	List of reefs is located in Earth	North Sulawesi, Indonesia	1.6700°N 124.7500°E	Bunaken National Park is renowned as one of the world's best diving and snorkeling destinations. Approximately 97% of the park's area consists of sea, with more than 390 types of coral reefs decorating its seabed. The coral reefs in Bunaken are formed as part of the Indo-Pacific coral reef ecosystem, and are known as one of the highest marine biodiversity in the world.
Coral Triangle		Mainly Indonesia	3.970166°N 134.819424°E	Called the "Amazon of the seas", this is a large area defined within a triangular area in the waters of Indonesia, Malaysia, Papua New Guinea, Philippines, Solomon Islands and Timor-Leste.
Daintree Reef	List of reefs is located in Earth	Coral Sea, Queensland, Australia	16.032856°S 145.434958°E	Named after geologist and photographer Richard Daintree, this system is adjacent to the Daintree Rainforest.
Darwin Mounds	List of reefs is located in Earth	Off the northwest coast of Scotland	59.45°N 7.13°W	Located around 1,000 m (3,280 feet) below the surface, this system consists of a big field of sand mounds.
Filippo Reef		450 km east of Starbuck Island in the Pacific Ocean	05.30°S 151.50°W	
Flinders Reef	List of reefs is located in Earth	Off Moreton Island in the Coral Sea, Queensland, Australia	26°59′18″S 153°26′31.4″E	
French Frigate Shoals		Northwestern Hawaiian Islands	23.4456°N 166.846°W	This is a 32-kilometre (20 mi; 17 nmi) long, crescent-shaped reef maintained by the United States Fish and Wildlife Service as a field station within the Papahānaumokuākea Marine National Monument.
Great Barrier Reef		Coral Sea, Queensland, Australia	18.1710°S 147.4200°E	The largest in the world
Isla Pérez		Gulf of Mexico	22.2340°N 89.4200°W	
Kingman Reef		North Pacific Ocean	6.23°N 162.25°W	Roughly triangular in shape
Lansdowne Bank		Coral Sea	20.35°S 160.30°E	This is one of the biggest banks on Earth.
Lyra Reef	List of reefs is located in Earth	Papua New Guinea	1.45°S 153.20°E	
Manuel Luis Reefs	List of reefs is located in Earth	Brazil	0.913302°S 44.319530°W	The largest coral reef of South America.
Maro Reef		Northwestern Hawaiian Islands	25.415°N 170.590°W	This reef is named after the ship Maro, captained by Captain Joseph Allen who discovered the reef in 1820.
Mesoamerican Barrier Reef System	List of reefs is located in Earth	From the Yucatán Peninsula to Honduras	18.343938°N 87.421764°W	Also known as the Great Mayan Reef or Great Maya Reef, this is a World Heritage Site.
Mexico Rocks	List of reefs is located in Earth	Ambergris Caye, Belize	17.98909°N 87.90574°W	This area consists mainly of boulder corals and comprises about 100 Holocene patch reefs in a cluster on a ridge made of Pleistocene limestone.
Miami Terrace Reef		Florida, United States	25.45°N 79.55°W	This is a deep reef system that lies at 200 to 600 metres (656 to 1,969 ft) below sea level.
Minami-Tori-shima		Japan	24.1712°N 153.5850°E	
Minerva Reefs		Fiji and Tonga	23.38°S 178.54°W	
Miri-Sibuti Coral Reef National Park	List of reefs is located in Earth	Sarawak, Malaysia	4.19°N 113.51°E	This is a protected area and popular dive site.
Necker Island	List of reefs is located in Earth	Northwestern Hawaiian Islands	23.575°N 164.700278°W	Included within the Papahānaumokuākea Marine National Monument. The second-largest marine habitat in the Northwestern Hawaiian Islands, totaling 385,000 acres (156,000 ha). Lacks a fringing reef but has a shallow reef, beyond which extend deep-water coral shelves for many miles. Habitat includes 16 species of stony coral and is the easternmost place in the Hawaiian Islands where table corals of the genus Acropora are found.
New Caledonia Barrier Reef		New Caledonia	20.2443°S 164.3359°E	This is a double-barrier coral reef, and the second-longest on Earth, the longest being the Belize Barrier Reef.
Ningaloo Coast	List of reefs is located in Earth	Western Australia	22.3345°S 113.4837°E	A World Heritage Site, this reef is noted for whale sharks.
North East Reef		Western Australia	28.2513°S 113.4841°E	
Osprey Reef		Coral Sea, Australia	13°54′29″S 146°36′55″E	
Palancar Reef	List of reefs is located in Earth	Cozumel, Mexico	20.296685°N 87.018439°W	A popular diving location, this is part of the Arrecifes de Cozumel National Park.
Qixingyan (Taiwan)	List of reefs is located in Earth	Pingtung County, Taiwan	21.453198°N 120.492894°E	This is a shallow system with parts being visible at low tide. Many shipwrecks have occurred here.
Reunion Island's coral reef		Réunion	21.0851°S 55.2214°E	Threatened in recent times by an increase in human exploitation as well as pollution
Røst Reef	List of reefs is located in Earth	Lofoten, Norway	67.483951°N 12.018849°E	This is the largest Lophelia reef known, and the biggest known deep-water coral reef system.
Scorpion Reef		Yucatán, Mexico	22.2258°N 89.40578°W	This reef is part of the Campeche Bank archipelago.
Sha`b Abu Nuhas	List of reefs is located in Earth	Northern Red Sea	27.567°N 33.917°E	Considered a hazard to ships, this is a popular diving site.
South Sentinel Island	List of reefs is located in Earth	Andaman Islands	10.5840°N 92.1318°E	
Sula Reef	List of reefs is located in Earth	Sør-Trøndelag, Norway		This reef is composed of Lophelia pertusa coral.
Tubbataha Reef	List of reefs is located in Earth	Sulu Sea, Philippines	8.55°N 119.55°E	This reef system contains a very high density of different species and is designated a World Heritage Site. Tubbataha Reef is the world's richest and most pristine reef.
Villa Blanca Reef	List of reefs is located in Earth	Cozumel, Mexico	20.4839°N 86.9749°W	An unprotected reef located outside of the Arrecifes de Cozumel National Park.
Virgin Islands	List of reefs is located in Earth	Caribbean Sea	18.0°N 65.0°W	Scleractinian corals, Millepora.
Yabiji	List of reefs is located in Earth	Ryukyu Islands	25.0°N 125.266667°E	Reef group composed of about 300 kinds of corals.

== See also ==
- Fringing reef
- Recreational dive sites
- Recreational diving
- Southeast Asian coral reefs
- The Structure and Distribution of Coral Reefs
