= Surprise Atoll =

Atoll in the western Pacific Ocean

Native name: Atoll de la Surprise (French)
- Location in the Pacific Ocean

Geography
- Location: Pacific Ocean
- Coordinates: 18°23′S 163°5′E

Administration
- France

Surprise Atoll (French: Atoll de la Surprise) is a coral island forming part of the Entrecasteaux Reefs, in the northwest of New Caledonia. As such, it has been listed as a UNESCO World Heritage Site since 2008, along with the lagoons of New Caledonia.

== Geography ==
The atoll is in the centre of the Entrecasteaux Reefs which form the northwestern end of the lagoon of the New Caledonia archipelago. It is about 120 nautical miles (220 km) from the northwestern tip of Grande Terre.

The atoll's barrier reef has a length of 65 km and is not entirely enclosed, with several passes and an opening to the west. It is one of the largest of the Entrecasteaux reefs, along with neighbouring Huon atoll . It has three islets covering approximately 3.3 km^{2} of land. Fabre and Le Leizour islands on the northeastern barrier reef of the atoll, and Surprise Island to the south.

Surprise Atoll is the only part of the Entrecasteaux Reefs to have been used by humans. The only permanent occupation occurred on its three islets between 1883 and 1928 for guano mining . Today, tit is home to a weather station that was established on Surprise Island in 1965. It is the only remaining human-made infrastructure.

== History ==
The Fabre and Le Leizour islands were named after two of New Caledonia's first ship pilots in the 19th century: Gustave Fabre (1841–1891) and Alexandre-Louis Le Leizour (1834–1886). They were christened by the crew of the cruiser Le Curieux in 1876. The name Surprise was given to the atoll by its discoverer, Antoine Bruni d'Entrecasteaux on July 1, 1792.
