= Bar Reef =

Coral reef system in Sri Lanka

Bar Reef Sanctuary
- Location within Sri Lanka
- Location: North Western Province, Sri Lanka
- Nearest city: Puttalam & Kalpitiya
- Coordinates: 8°23′N 79°44′E
- Area: 306.7 km^{2} (118.4 sq mi)
- Established: 1992
- Governing body: Department of Wildlife Conservation

The Bar Reef is a system of coral reefs just offshore from Sri Lanka's Kalpitiya peninsula. It has the greatest biodiversity of any coral reef in the waters around India and is one of the few pristine coral reef systems in Sri Lanka.

== Overview ==
Bar Reef is a complex of reefs which stretch parallel to the coast from the northern end of the Kalpitiya peninsula to the islands which separate Portugal Bay from the Gulf of Mannar. It has high ecological, biological and aesthetic significance, being home to 156 species of coral and 283 species of fish.

The Bar Reef was declared a marine reserve in 1992. The reserve covers 306.7 square kilometres (118.4 mi^{2}).

== Coastal Resources Management Project ==
For many years there was hardly any management of the Bar Reef and it was under threat both from natural enemies, (crown-of-thorns starfish, coastal erosion and sedimentation) as well as from human activity.

In 1999, the Asian Development Bank (ADB) decided to fund a Coastal Resources Management Project (CRMP) in Sri Lanka, to establish integrated management of coastal resources in order to improve their sustainability by addressing the problems of coastal erosion, pollution, unmanaged fishing, over-exploitation of resources and poverty in the coastal areas.

The Bar Reef was declared part of a Special Management Area (SAM) composed of the northern part of the Kalpitiya peninsula and the islands in Portugal Bay; all areas where human activity impinges directly on the welfare of the reef ecosystem.

The threats to the ecosystem of the Bar Reef were identified as over-exploitation of fish resources (there is an observable decline in the number of fish), unsuitable fishing methods (such as deep purse seining, which damage the coral and deplete fish resources) and pollution from human activities (prawn farms and agriculture).

== See also ==
- Daintree Reef
- List of reefs
