= Punta Sur =

Place on the island of Cozumel, Mexico

Coordinates: 20.28°N 86.99°W

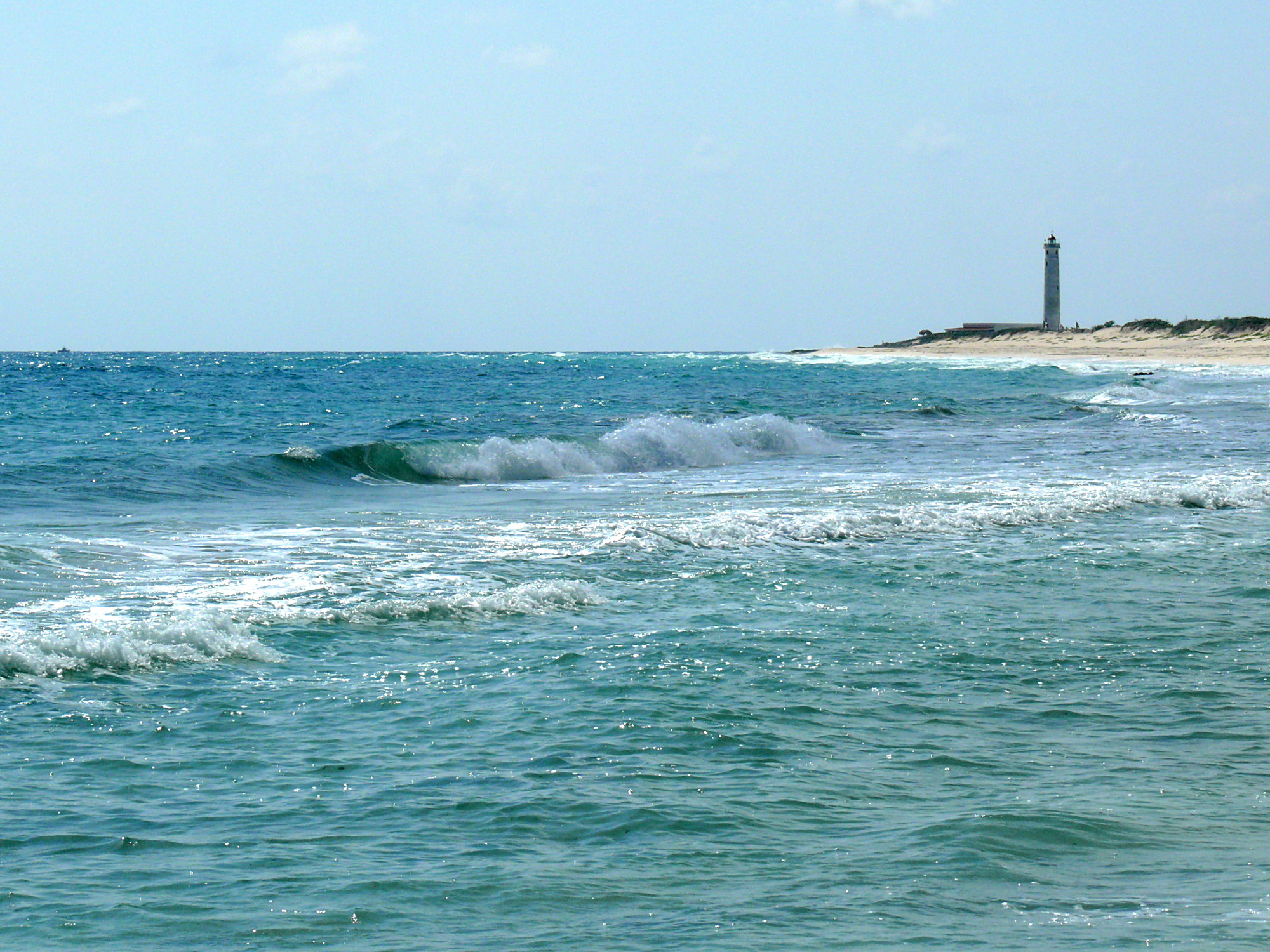
Celarain lighthouse at Punta Sur

Punta Sur is the eastern most point of Mexico and is on the island of Isla Mujeres. It should not be confused with the Parque Eco Turístico Punta, which is on the separate island of Cozumel, a 247-acre (1.00 km^{2}) ecological park that covers the reefs, beaches, lagoons, and low forest of the surrounding area. The reef system is also part of the Arrecifes de Cozumel National Park.

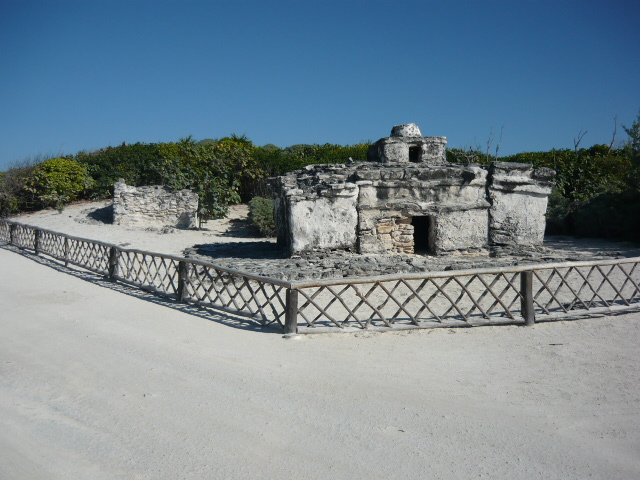
Tumba del Caracol, Punta Sur

The Celarain lighthouse (Faro de Celarain) sits on the Punta Sur promontory (Punta Celarain) and is part of a nautical museum. Just northeast of it is the Caracol (Tumba del Caracol), a Maya building erected during the post-classic period. There is a persistent myth, often repeated by tour guides, that the building functioned as a weather alarm, producing a whistle that would precede the arrival of a hurricane, but that is only a legend. The idea that the building somehow functioned as a lighthouse or beacon used to send signals to the mainland is another legend, but also incorrect; it was a temple and nothing more.

Some of the sandy beaches are protected to allow hatching for sea turtles. Observation towers have been erected at the Columbia lagoon to watch wildlife. Off Punta Sur is the Devil's Throat scuba diving area, while in the closer reef visitors can snorkel. The dirt road area is accessible to off-road vehicles and allows some tours to access the area as part of a guided excursion. At the end of the dirt road you will find 2 beach clubs, Papito's Beach Club Restaurant and Bar as well as the Punta Sur Beach Club. Included in the entrance fee to Punta Sur Park is also a guided boat ride on the Colombia Lagoon for bird watching, sightseeing, crocodile observation and more.

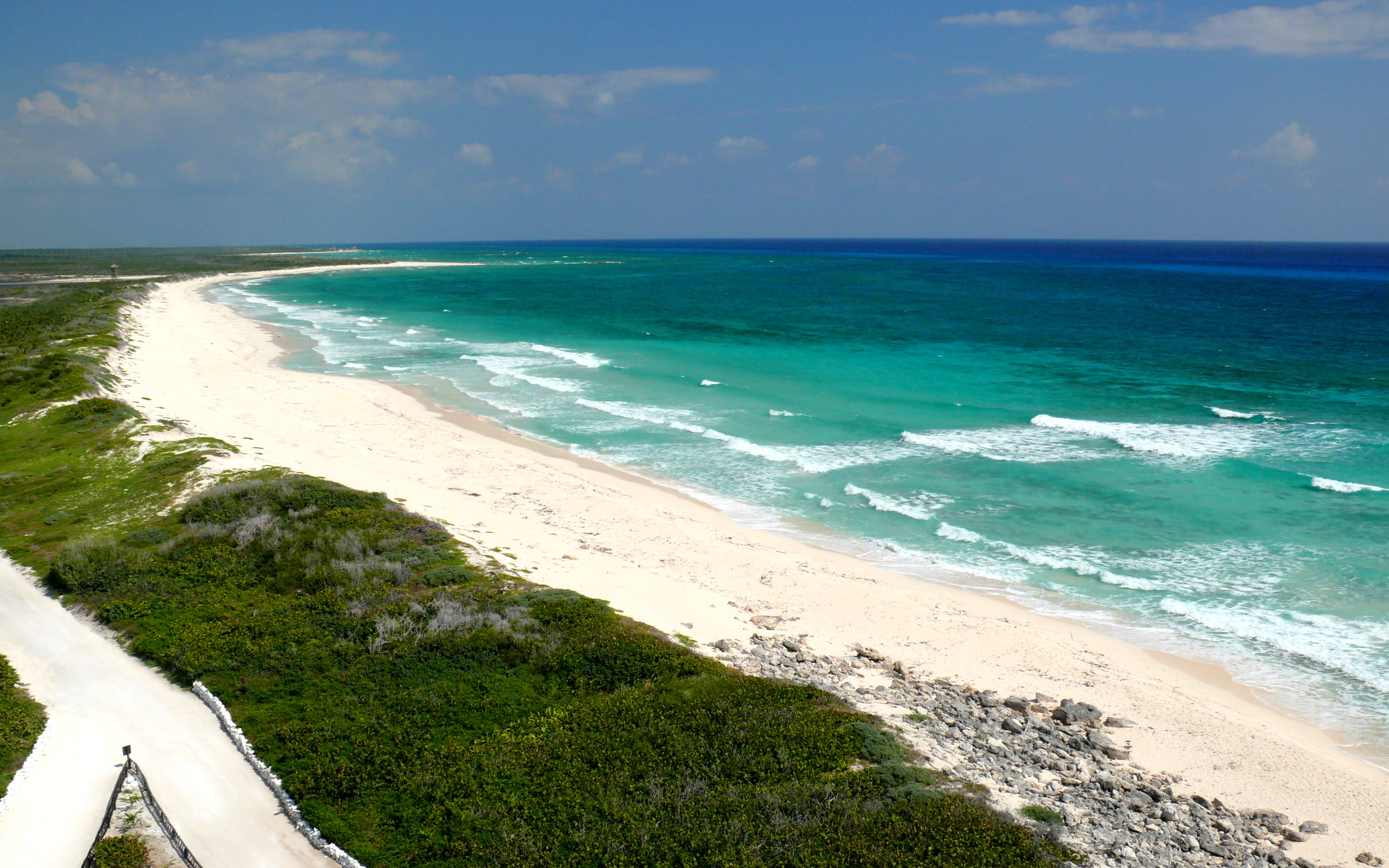
Cozumel Punta Sur View-27527

== See also ==
- Yucatan Peninsula
- Cozumel
- Cancun
- Cozumel (archaeological site)
