= Entrecasteaux Reefs =

Group of reefs and atolls in New Caledonia

Map of New Caledonia and Vanuatu

Located in the Coral Sea, the Entrecasteaux Reefs are shallow reefs off the northwest coast of New Caledonia. Uninhabited, they lie 223 km off the northeastern tip of Grande Terre, extending from the Belep Islands, from which they are separated by the "Grand Passage" a strait 500 to 600 meters deep. They form the northern boundary of the New Caledonian archipelago's lagoon .

== Geography ==
The reefs comprise of:

- Huon Atoll, with Huon Island; it is the largest of the atolls along with Surprise Atoll
- Pelotas Atoll
- Portail Atoll
- the Guilbert Reefs
- the Mérite Reefs

== History ==
The Entrecasteaux Reefs were discovered on July 1, 1792, by the expedition of Antoine Bruni d'Entrecasteaux. Nearly all of the names of the reefs, atolls, and islets were given by d'Entrecasteaux in 1792; the exceptions are Fabre and Le Leizour islands, Pelotas Atoll, and Guilbert Reef. The reef group as a whole bears d'Entrecasteaux's own surname. Surprise Atoll reportedly reflects his surprise at finding new land so close to Grande Terre when he believed he had already rounded New Caledonia. The other three names he gave come from members of his expedition: his second-in-command and captain of the Espérance Jean-Michel Huon de Kermadec; Lt. Malo de la Motte du Portail; and Ensign Mérite. Guilbert Reef is named after the hydrographer of Jules Dumont d'Urville's 1827 expedition.

== Biodiversity ==
The reefs are also an important breeding and nesting sanctuary for the green sea turtle.

The Entrecasteaux Reefs are one of the six zones of the Lagoons of New Caledonia inscribed as a UNESCO World Heritage Site in 2008.
