= Miami Terrace Reef =

Coral reef in the Atlantic Ocean

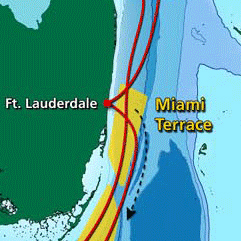
- Location of the Miami Terrace Reef. Image courtesy of NOAA Ocean Explorer (cropped).

- Location within Florida Location within North Atlantic

Location
- Location: North Atlantic
- Coordinates: 25°45′N 79°55′W
- Country: United States

Geology
- Type: reef

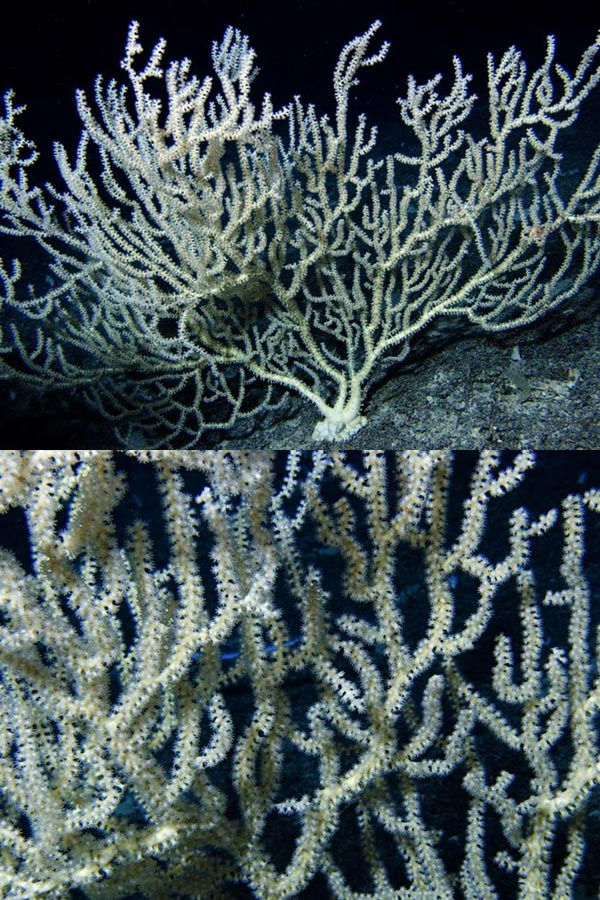
Bamboo corals (Keratoisis flexibilis) on Miami Terrace Reef 15 miles off the coast of Miami, Florida. Image courtesy of NOAA Ocean Explorer

The Miami Terrace Reef (25°45′N 79°55′W) is a coral reef off the coast of Florida stretching from South Miami to Boca Raton, in the Atlantic Ocean. It lies in depths of 650 to 2,000 feet (200 to 610 m) on top of a geological formation known as the Miami Terrace, a 40-mile (65 km) long shelf about 15 miles (24 km) off shore. Much of the platform remains unexplored, and new portions of the reef are still being discovered. University of Miami researchers discovered new reef sites there in December 2005.

The terrace consists of long and well-defined rocky ridges made of limestone that provide a habitat for many types of corals, sponges, and fish. Fish species observed there include wreckfish, barrelfish, and bright red alfonsinos (Beryx decadactylus). Recently observed invertebrate species have included Lophelia pertusa coral, stylasterine hydrocoral (Stylasteridae), bamboo coral (Isididae), and various sponges and octocorals. Motile invertebrates such as crabs and sea urchins have also been observed there, including Asteroporpa sp. ophiuroids, Stylocidaris sp. urchins, Mollusca, Actiniaria, and Decapoda crustaceans (Chaceon fenneri and Galatheidae).

Corals on the terrace are vulnerable to the effects of bottom trawling and dredging, and the Miami Terrace has been proposed for protection from these activities.

== History ==
Studies done primarily by the University of Miami (UM) in the 1970s surveyed the Miami Terrace geological formation. Biologists also retrieved samples of reef fauna. John Reed, with Harbor Branch Oceanographic Institution, observed dense aggregations of 50 to 100 wreckfish there in May 2004 during a submersible dive. A UM team with the National Oceanic and Atmospheric Administrations Ocean Exploration program discovered new reef sites there in December 2005 using an autonomous underwater vehicle.

== Conservation ==
The Miami Terrace and other areas of deep sea coral can be damaged by certain kinds of fishing gear such as bottom trawling or dredging. Areas on the Miami Terrace and a series of biogeographically similar areas were approved in 2004 for protection from these activities through the South Atlantic Fishery Management Council but were never finalized. Neighboring coral areas that have also been considered for protection include the Pourtales Terrace to the south, an area known as Savannah-East Florida, and Stetson Reef to the north.

== See also ==
- List of reefs
