= Mesoamerican Barrier Reef System =

Marine region in Central America

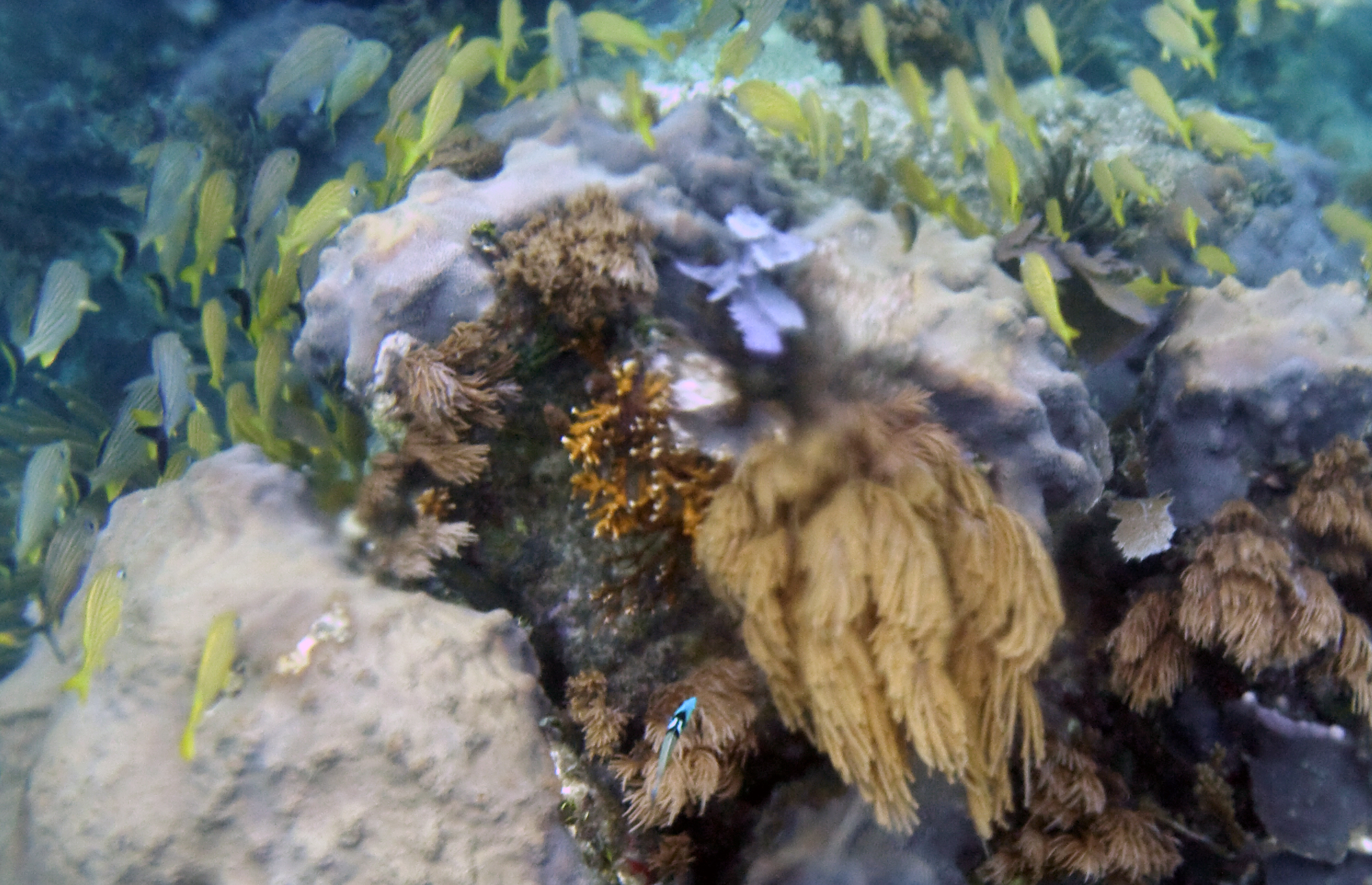

Ecology
- Realm: Neotropical

Geography
- Area: 106,629.5 km^{2} (41,169.9 mi^{2})
- Countries: Belize, Guatemala, Honduras, Mexico

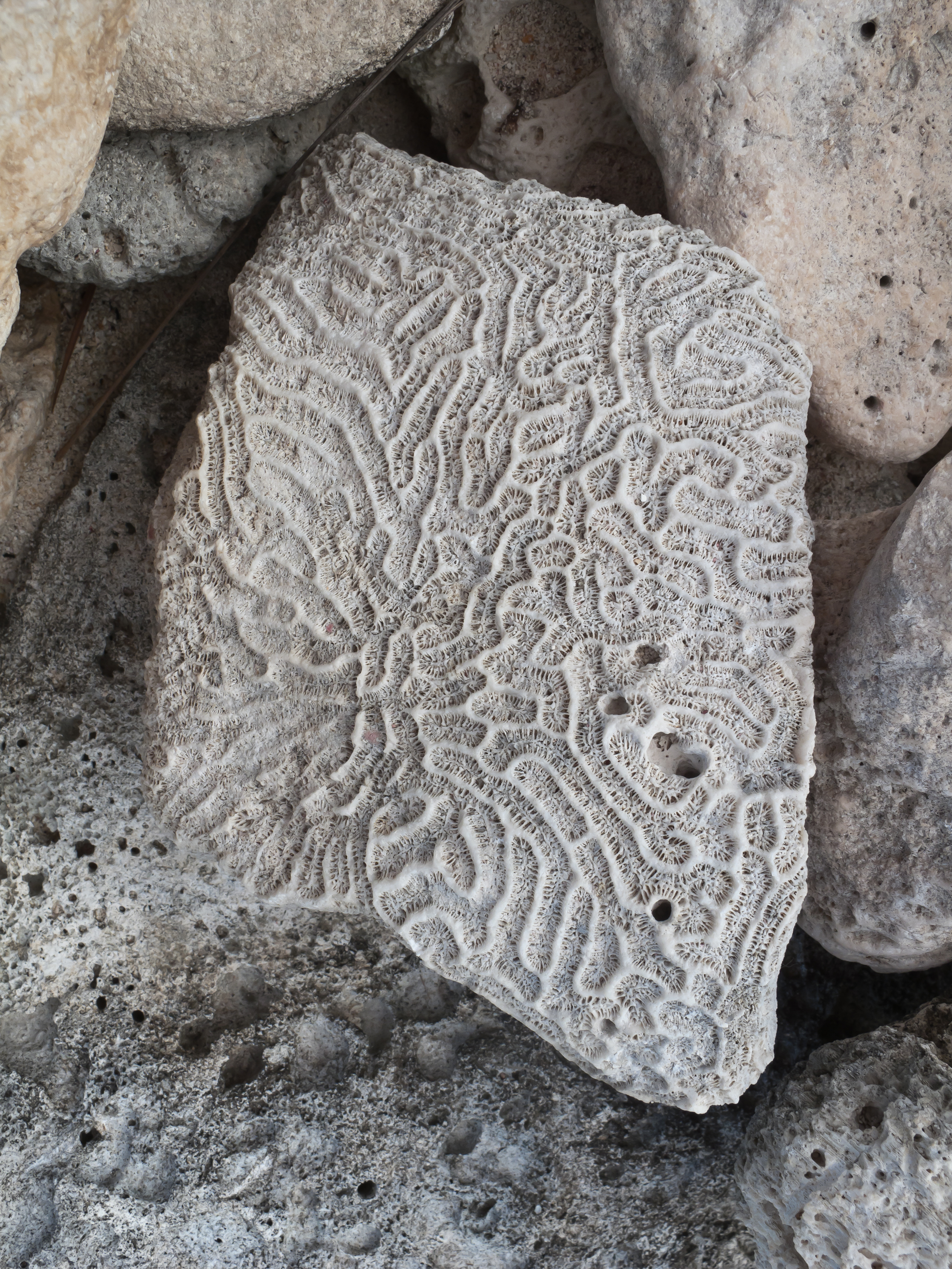
A coral skeleton from the Mesoamerican Barrier Reef System, Quintana Roo, Mexico

The Mesoamerican Barrier Reef System (MBRS), also popularly known as the Great Mayan Reef or Great Maya Reef, is a marine region that stretches over 1,126 kilometres (700 mi) along the coasts of four countries – Mexico, Belize, Guatemala, and Honduras – from Isla Contoy at the northern tip of the Yucatán Peninsula south to Belize, Guatemala and the Bay Islands of Honduras. It is the second-longest reef system in the world.

== Location ==
It includes various protected areas and parks, including the Punta Cancún, Belize Barrier Reef, Arrecifes de Cozumel National Park, Hol Chan Marine Reserve (Belize), Sian Ka'an biosphere reserve, and the Cayos Cochinos Marine Park. Belize's coastline, including the Belize Barrier Reef, is home to approximately 30% of the Mesoamerican Barrier Reef System, with Mexico holding the largest share of the four countries, Honduras also with a substantial portion, and the smallest share of the MBRS coastline being Guatemala.

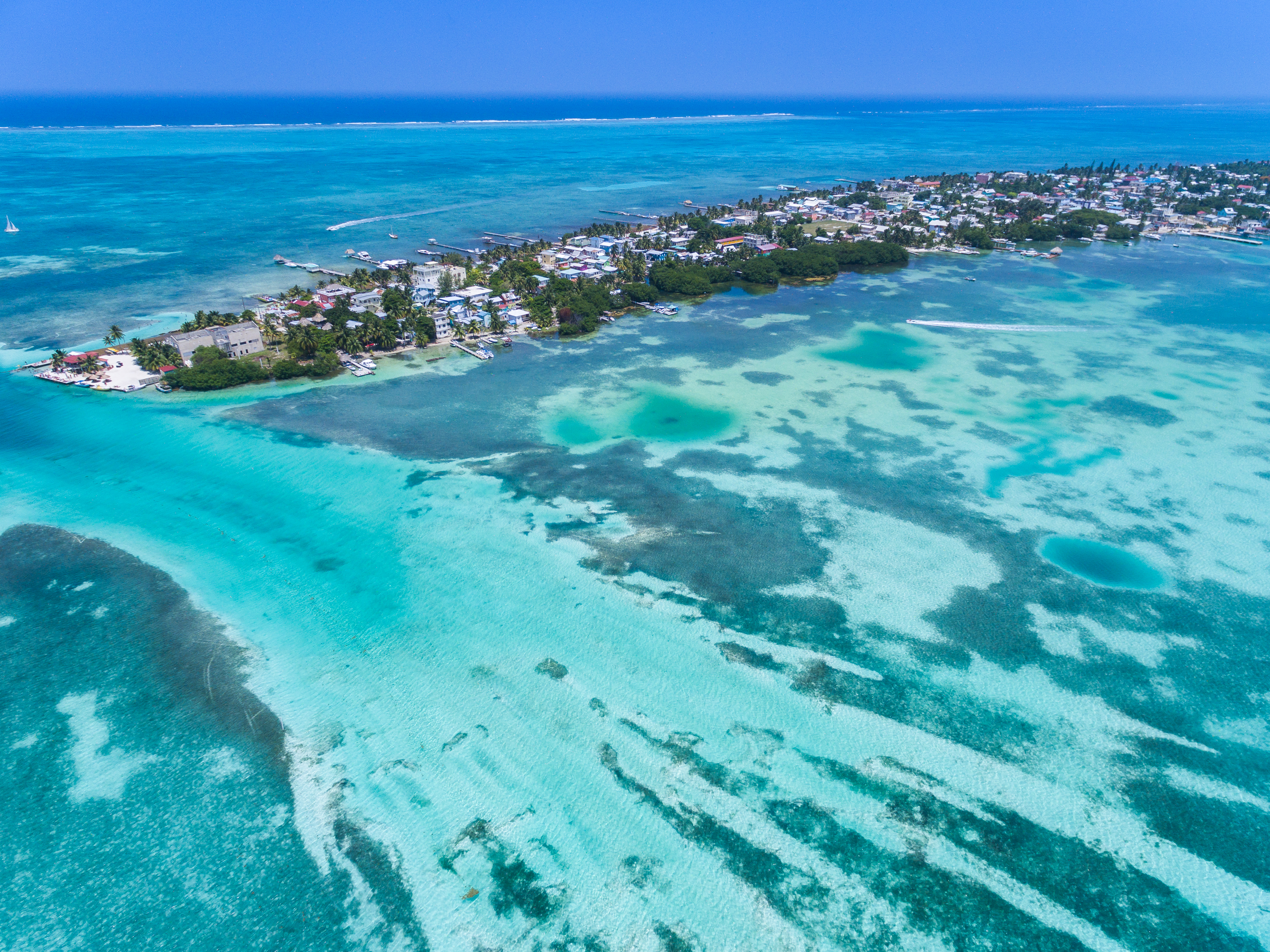
Aerial view of Caye Caulker in Belize

It begins near Isla Contoy on the northern tip of the Yucatán Peninsula in Mexico and continues south alongside the entire Riviera Maya, including areas like Cancún, Playa del Carmen, Tulum, Cozumel, and on to the southernmost point of coastal Quintana Roo, with Banco Chinchorro and Xcalak. It then continues south along the eastern coast of Belize, including many cayes and atolls. It extends to the north-east corner of Honduras. It is the largest barrier reef in the Western Hemisphere. It is the second largest after the Great Barrier Reef of Australia; the MBRS is much less researched and recognized.

== Biodiversity ==
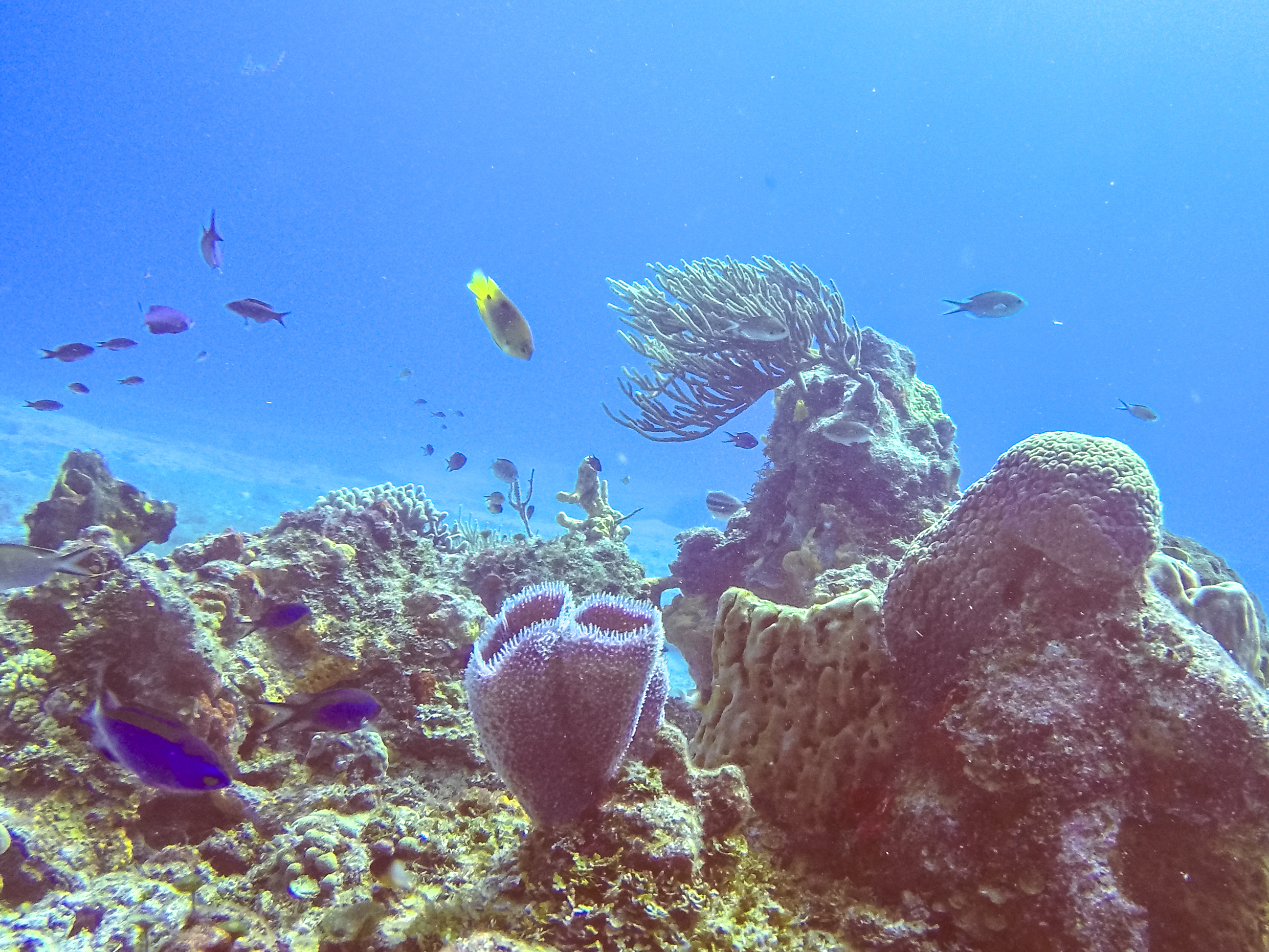
Coral reef and marine life in Arrecifes de Cozumel National Park

The reef system is home to more than 65 species of stony coral, 350 species of mollusk, and more than 500 species of fish. Numerous species live in or around the reef system that are endangered or under some degree of protection, including five species of sea turtles (green sea turtle, loggerhead sea turtle, leatherback turtle, hawksbill turtle and olive ridley turtle), the queen conch, the West Indian manatee, the splendid toadfish, the American crocodile, the Morelet's crocodile, the Nassau grouper, elkhorn coral, and black coral.

The reef system is home to one of the world's largest populations of manatees, with an estimated 1,000 to 1,500 individuals. Some northern areas of the reef system near Isla Contoy are home to the largest fish on the planet, the whale shark. These normally solitary animals congregate in social groups to feed and mate.

== Threats ==
The Mesoamerican Barrier Reef System is considered critically endangered according to the IUCN Red List of Ecosystems. Over the past 50 years, this ecosystem has faced numerous threats, including hurricanes, rising surface water temperatures, ocean acidification, pollution, overfishing, invasive species such as lionfish, and disease outbreaks of corals and urchins.

The reef system is suffering an invasion by lionfish (Pterois volitans and Pterois miles), which are native to the Indo-Pacific region. They severely damage the reef ecosystem by eating nearly every reef-tending species, such as cleaner shrimp and other species that eat algae, which keep the corals clean, alive, and disease-free. Lionfish eat up to 90% of these reef-tending species in a given area within just a few months, which can result in a quick death for a reef. Valuable commercial species, such as lobster, are being negatively affected by the spread of the lionfish due to their enormous appetite.

Coastal erosion is a significant threat to the Mesoamerican Barrier Reef System, worsened by human activities such as deforestation, unsustainable tourism, and coastal development. This erosion increases sedimentation in nearby waters, which reduces light penetration essential for coral photosynthesis, weakening coral health.

Additionally, climate change has emerged as a critical factor affecting the health of the reef. Rising ocean temperatures can cause coral bleaching, a stress response where corals expel the symbiotic algae that provide them with energy and vibrant color. This process leaves corals vulnerable to disease and death, further worsening the reef's fragility. Ocean acidification, another consequence of climate change, decreases the availability of carbonate ions that corals need to build their skeletons, weakening reef structures over time. Combined with sedimentation and nutrient runoff, coral species like Siderastrea siderea and Pseudodiploria strigosa have shown reduced growth rates and resilience due to these stressors. Declining coral health not only threatens the structure of the reef but also disrupts habitats for reef-dependent species such as fish, marine turtles, and invertebrates, posing a long-term risk to the biodiversity of the Mesoamerican Barrier Reef System.

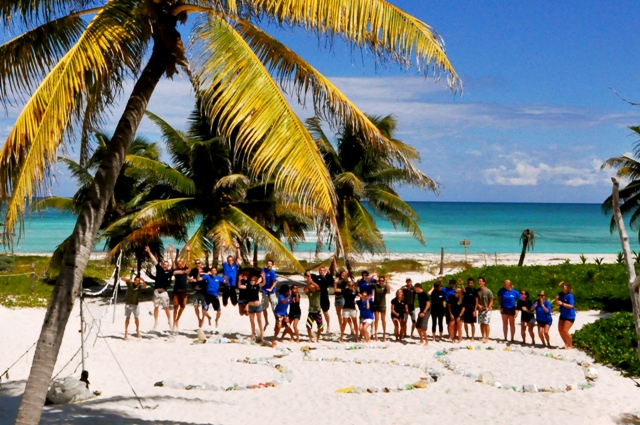
Volunteers in Pez Maya Mexico gathered to learn about the Mesoamerican Barrier Reef System. Pez Maya helps to monitor the reef and local communities gather to help increase awareness in the area. They organized a beach clean to pick up the litter and recycle. Between 32 people they collected more than 10 bags of rubbish. To help raise awareness to 350, and international environmental organization that is addressing the climate crisis, they made the litter into a 350.

== Conservation efforts ==
Multiple conservation initiatives are actively working to protect and restore the Mesoamerican Barrier Reef System in response to these threats. Organizations such as the Mesoamerican Reef Fund, the Healthy Reefs Initiative, and the World Wildlife Fund implement strategies to address erosion, pollution, and overfishing. These programs advocate for sustainable fishing practices, pollution control, and reef monitoring to reduce local stressors and enhance the resilience of the reef ecosystem.

Cross-border collaboration has been particularly impactful in addressing threats across national boundaries. Projects like the Integrated Transboundary Ridges-to-Reef Management Project unite Mexico, Belize, Guatemala, and Honduras, integrating approaches to conservation, such as controlling sediment runoff, establishing marine protected areas, and fostering community engagement. These collaborations have helped improve water quality and cut down on overfishing. There are still challenges remaining in managing land-based activities that contribute to sedimentation and pollution.

Local communities have been assisting conservation by participating in reef restoration efforts that involve coral farming and transplantation. Sustainable tourism, such as marine conservation tours, and public awareness campaigns to reduce human impacts on the reef. These combined efforts aim to mitigate the immediate threats to the reef and help build its resilience for the future.

== See also ==
- List of reefs
- Assisted evolution
- Coral Reef Alliance
