= Réunion's coral reef =

Coordinates: 21.0851°S 55.2214°E

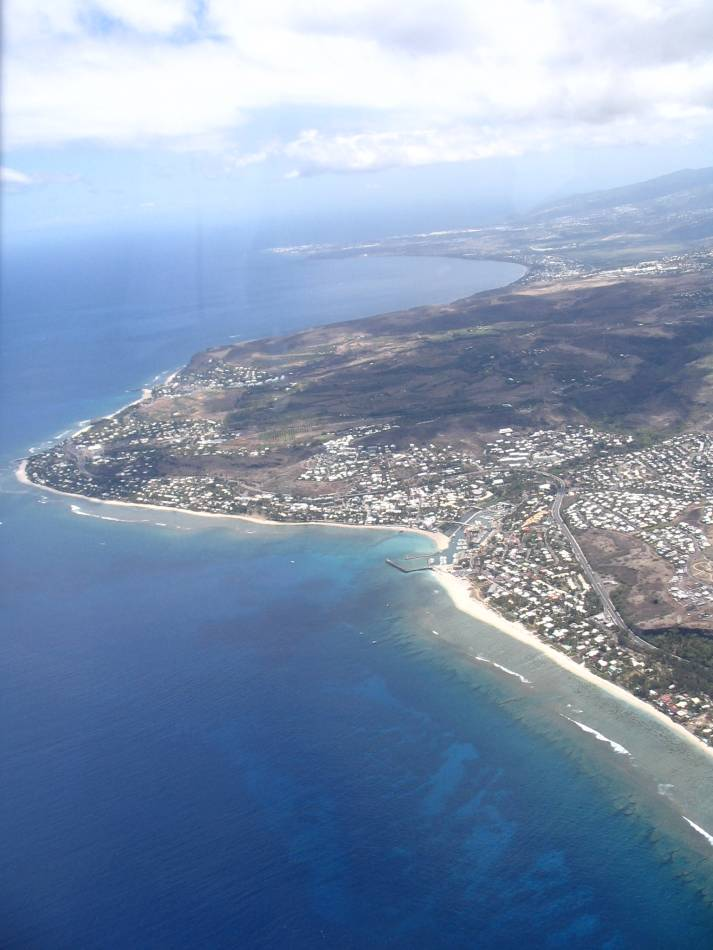
Saint-Gilles

Réunion is an island located near the eastern coast of Madagascar in the Indian Ocean. Its coral reef covers a concentrated part of the western littoral. The coral reef is located between St Leu and St Gilles. It is more than 9 kilometres (5.6 mi) long and ranges in width from 50 metres (160 ft) in its northern part at St. Gilles to 600 metres (2,000 ft) in the south. Since the island is distant from the continental shelf, the sea becomes deep not far from the coast. The presence of nearby deeper ocean currents supports a rich biodiversity fauna and flora in the reef environment.

== Environment and threats ==
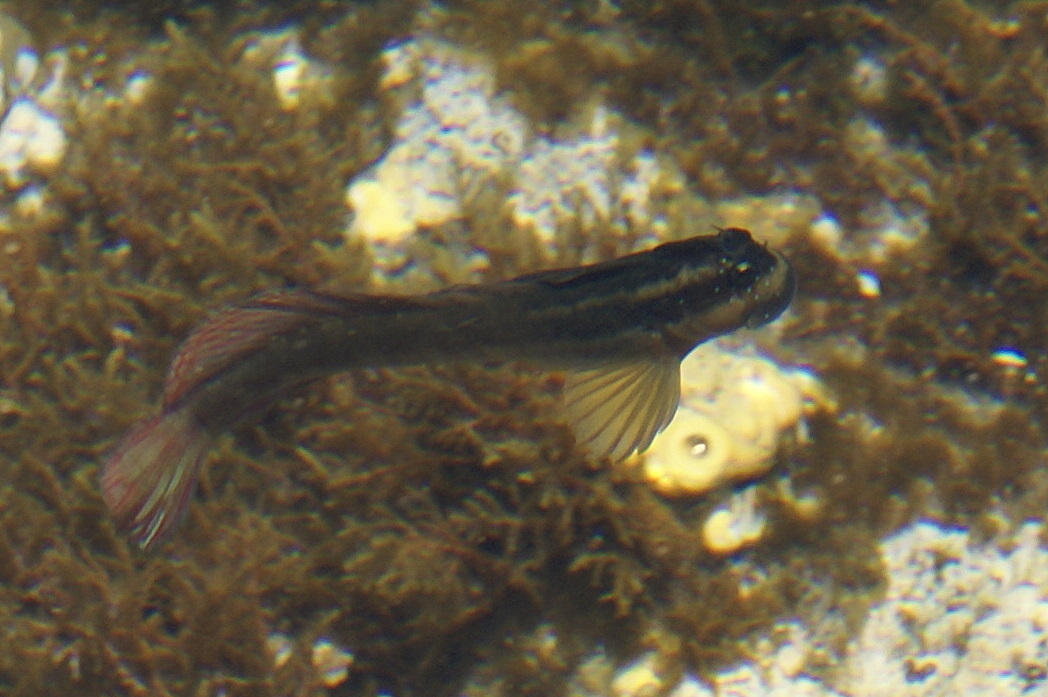
Blenniella

Coral reefs are among the most densely populated marine environments. The coral reef fringing Réunion is a rich habitat for soft and hard corals that provide food and habitat for an abundance of fish and shellfish. The corals feed on a diet of plankton and algae which they catch with their tentacles. The growth cycle of corals is relatively slow, with growth of about 10 centimetres (3.9 in) per year. Male corals disseminate sperm cells into the water, which fertilize free-floating eggs released by the female corals. Reproduction is limited due to the proportionately small number of male corals.

The integrity of Réunion's reef has recently become threatened by an increase in pollution and human exploitation of the ecologically sensitive marine life. Ocean water quality and the health of coral species are both symbiotic and reflexive; polluted water negatively impacts the health of coral reefs, and unhealthy reefs add to the degradation of ocean water quality. Studies show that ocean pollution inhibits coral growth and therefore contributes to algal blooms, which results in hypoxic conditions for coral reefs.

Coral is very sensitive to variations in water temperature. The effects of global warming on oceans have a direct impact on the health of coral reefs. The optimal water temperature for coral at Réunion is between 23 °C and 28 °C. Increased surface water temperature related to global warming can contribute to disease and bleaching of coral reefs, as is apparent on Réunion.

Natural cyclones and anthropogenic disturbances such as urban development of catchment areas affect the reefs of Réunion. These ecological disturbances have led to an increase in coral reef nutrient levels via submarine groundwater discharge. Increased nutrient levels have resulted in the modification of flora and fauna in the benthic zone. The coral reef is a natural barrier that protects the coast from typhoons.

== Management ==
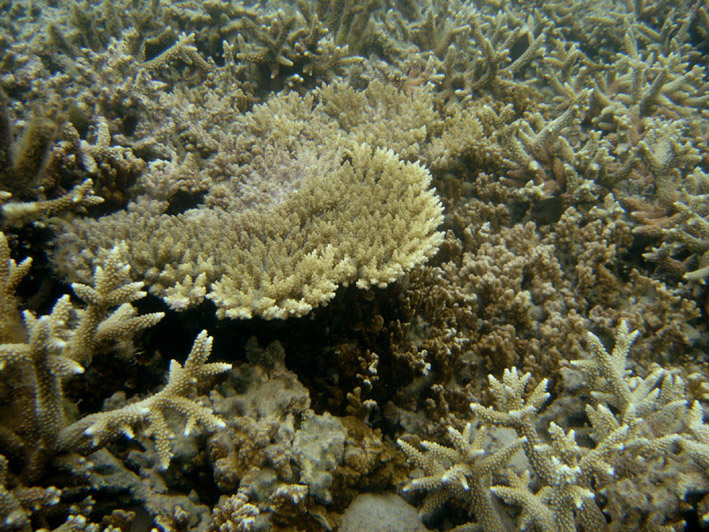
Acropora in the reef

The least vulnerable sectors of the reef are in St Paul and l’Etang-Salé (in the north), due to the absence of a reef ecosystem and the stability of the shoreline. Due to pressures from the nearby urban areas, the sector in Grande Anse and Boucan Cannot is moderately vulnerable, but there are few severe impacts. The highly vulnerable points are located at la Pointe des Aigrettes, la Pointe au Sel, la Ravine Blanche, St-Pierre and Grand Bois (in the south). The main factors causing vulnerability include beach erosion, a poor recovery rate of coral reef flats, hydrodynamic conditions, and urbanisation, which puts pressure on the soil and aggravates coastal erosion, degrades the landscape, and generates pollution. The reef areas near the dock at Pirogue and St-Pierre Ville are suffering irreversible deterioration due to increasing development.

The Marine Nature Reserve, created in 2007, plays a role in protecting the reef. By educating visitors, instilling respect and awareness of protective regulations, and working to decrease poaching, the Marine Nature Reserve has already made some progress in returning the reef to health.

One way to assess the degeneration is to measure the carrying capacity, one of the key indicators for coast management. Carrying capacity refers to the limit at which risk of irreparable degradation of the environment and the social climate are high. It is evaluated using 45 criteria, including anarchic development (unplanned construction), unmanaged use of land, and a lack of regard for the local architecture. Anarchic development compromises the environmental health of the water and the reef, and leads to visual degradation of the coast, increased atmospheric pollution due to car and boat emissions, increased release of waste (waste water and solid waste) due to the absence of appropriate infrastructure to treat it, saturates service infrastructures during the high season, increases loss of habitat and biodiversity, leads to overconsumption of natural resources by a growing population with demands for facilities such as golf courses, causes an abandonment of traditional, conservation-friendly activity, and leads to the modification of socio-cultural identities due to the change in lifestyle.

The International Coral Reef Initiative (ICRI), in partnership with the Global Fund for Coral Reefs (GFCR) and the UN Climate Change High-Level Climate Champions, has launched the Coral Reef Breakthrough. This initiative aims to secure the future of at least 125,000 km^{2} of shallow-water tropical coral reefs by 2030 through investments of at least US$12 billion. The strategy focuses on mitigating local drivers of loss, doubling the area of coral reefs under effective protection, accelerating restoration, and securing significant investments from both public and private sources.

== Economic impact ==
The coral barrier is an important resource for Réunion. It sustains the standards of living of these parts of the island due to increased tourism profits and its influence on real estate prices.

Many activities are organized around the coral reef, making it an essential part of the island's economy. Activities include scuba diving, snorkelling, boat trips, fishing, helicopter flights, and paragliding. Many diving schools suggest training sessions and first dives at reef sites. Local businesses, organizations, and government localities organize photography contests and other events to boost tourism around the reef.

In a recent study, specialists estimated the benefits of leisure activities such as scuba diving to be above €2,076,150, water sports above €118,018, and diving boats and submarines above €1,851,614. The coral reef influences the price of local housing; homes close to a beach protected by corals enjoy lower real estate prices.

== See also ==
- List of reefs
