= Filippo Reef =

Phantom reef in the Pacific Ocean

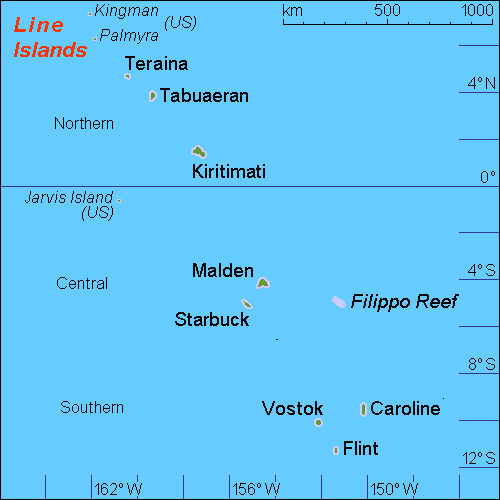
- Filippo Reef and the Line Islands

In-universe information
- Type: Phantom island

Filippo Reef is a reef that is asserted to be in the Pacific Ocean at 05°30′S 151°50′W, 450 kilometres (280 mi) east of Starbuck Island in the Line Islands. The reef was reported by the master of the Italian barque Filippo as having been seen on 28 June 1886. From an unidentified report of breakers dated 1926, it was estimated to have a water depth of only 0.6 to 0.9 metres (2 to 3 ft), and appeared to be about 1.6 kilometres (1.0 mi) long northwest to southeast, and less in width.

The only sighting referenced shows a date of 1926. The topographic data supplied by the General Bathymetric Chart of the Oceans (GEBCO), however, shows a sea depth of 3.3 miles (5.3 km). It is therefore likely that this 1926 report is an error, and that Filippo Reef is a phantom island, and that therefore any maps showing it are relying on the 1926 report and are also in error.

Nevertheless, it is marked in the 2015 edition of the National Geographic Atlas of the World.

== See also ==
- List of reefs
