= Mexico Rocks =

Coordinates: 18.004834°N 87.907960°W

Mexico Rocks is a shallow patch reef complex located off the far northern tip of Ambergris Caye, and is part of the Belize Barrier Reef system in the Caribbean Sea. The site consists of approximately 100 Holocene patch reefs clustered on a Pleistocene ridge of limestone and is composed predominantly of boulder star corals (Montastraea annularis). The reef has accumulated in shallow water, about 2.5 to 5 metres (8 to 16 ft) deep, over the last 420 years, under static sea level conditions. The site was recommended for designation as a marine preserve in 1978, and was approved in 2015 as a part of the Hol Chan Marine Reserve. The reef is popular among snorkelers and SCUBA divers, and it is seen as an important addition to Ambergris Caye's ecotourism attractions.

== Wildlife ==
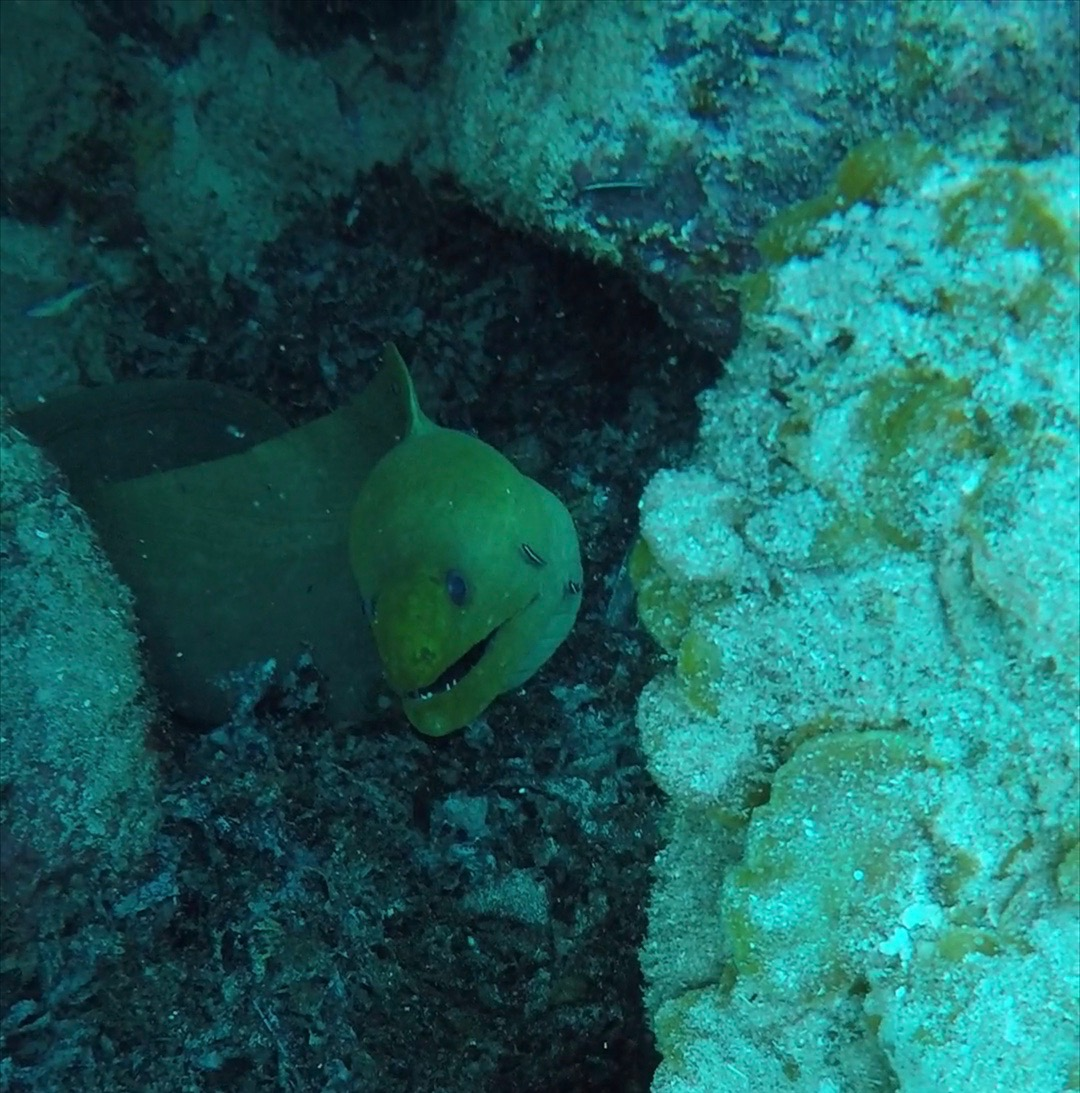
Green moray eel at Mexico Rocks, Belize

Patch coral reefs that predominantly consist of Montastraea annularis are a rare occurrence in Belize; the only other such patch reefs in the country are located at Glover's Reef. In addition, staghorn coral (Acropora cervicornis) occurs on the ridge's windward and leeward flanks. Thirty species of hard coral have been identified at Mexico Rocks.

The reef is abundant in fish and invertebrate life. Common fish found at Mexico Rocks include Atlantic blue tang (Acanthurus coeruleus), yellowtail snapper (Ocyurus chrysurus), and southern stingray (Dasyatis americana). Nurse sharks (Ginglymostoma cirratum), and green moray eel (Gymnothorax funebris) are also found on the reef. Spiny lobster (Pallinuridae), conch (Strombidae), arrow crab (Stenorhynchus seticornis), banded shrimps (Stenopus hispidus), and many sponge species also inhabit the reef.

== See also ==
- List of reefs
