= Lyra Reef =

Coral atoll in Papua New Guinea

- Location of Lyra Reef north-east of Papua New Guinea Lyra Reef (Pacific Ocean)

Geography
- Location: Solomon Sea
- Coordinates: 1°45′S 153°20′E
- Type: Reef

Administration
- Papua New Guinea

Additional information
- Time zone: AEST (UTC+10)
- Official website: www.ncdc.gov.pg

Lyra Reef is a remote submerged coral atoll, about 40 kilometres (25 mi) in diameter, extending over an area of 1,300 square kilometres (500 mi^{2}). It lies about 200 kilometres (120 mi) north-east of New Ireland in the Bismarck Archipelago of Papua New Guinea, and 150 kilometres (93 mi) north-east of Simberi Island, the closest island, and about the same distance north-west of the Nuguria Islands.

The depths around the perimeter of the reef are generally less than 37 metres (121 ft) and in places are less than 11 metres (36 ft). The least depth is 6.1 metres (20 ft) on its north side. Within the reef, in the lagoon, there are depths exceeding 183 metres (600 ft). A gap on the north-west side of the reef gives access to this deep water. Depths of more than 2,700 metres (8,900 ft) are found within 8 kilometres (5 mi) of the reef.

== See also ==
- List of reefs
