= Daintree Reef =

Coordinates: 16°03′28.56″S 145°43′49.58″E

Daintree Reef is a reef system in the Coral Sea, Queensland. Named after Richard Daintree, it is adjacent to the Daintree Rainforest, just off the coast of Cape Tribulation, 110 kilometres (68 mi) north of Cairns. The system is composed of three reefs: Daintree Reef North, Central and South.

== See also ==
- List of reefs
