= Coral reefs of the Virgin Islands =

Marine ecosystems found in the U.S. Virgin Islands

Coordinates: 18°0′0″N 65°0′0″W

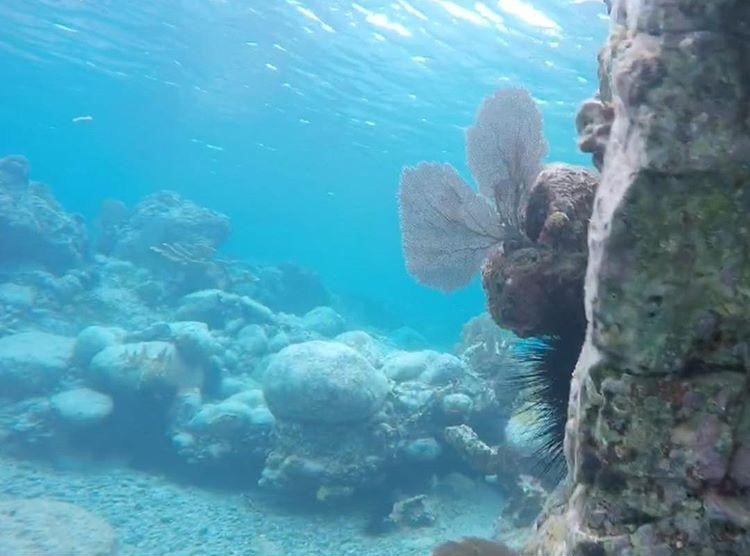
Corals picture taken from Brewers Bay on St. Thomas

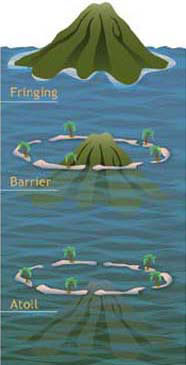
Formation of fringing reefs (top), barrier reefs (middle) and atolls (bottom).

One of the marine ecosystems found in the U.S. Virgin Islands are the coral reefs. These coral reefs can be located between the islands of St. Croix, St. Thomas, and St. John. These coral reefs have an area of 297.9 km^{2}, along with other marine habitats that are in between. The way these coral reefs grow are by coral larvae swimming freely and attaching themselves to hard surfaces around the islands and start to develop a skeleton on the outside of their skin to protect themselves from predators but also allow a new place for other coral larvae to attach to and grow on. These corals can form into three different structures; fringing reefs, which are reefs that are close to the shore, barrier reefs, which are reefs that are alongside the shore and is separated by deep water, and an atoll reef which is a coral reef that circles a lagoon or body of water.

== Distribution ==
As stated, the coral reefs such as fringing reefs, deep reefs, patch reefs and spur and groove formation are distributed over three islands in the Virgin Islands which are St. Croix (Salt River Bay National Historical Park and Ecological Preserve, Buck Island Reef National Monument), St. Thomas, and St. John (Virgin Islands Coral Reef National Monument). The coral reefs found offshore of St. Thomas and St. John are distributed patchily around the islands. Additionally, a developed barrier reef system surrounds St. Croix along its eastern and southern shores.

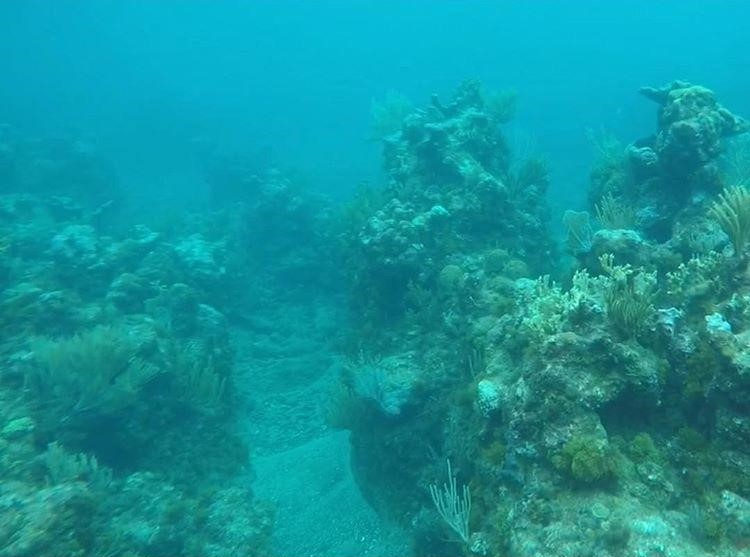
Corals picture taken from Brewers Bay on St. Thomas.

== Ecology ==
The coral reefs as well as hard-bottom habitat accounts for 297.9 km^{2}. The coral reefs are home to diverse species. There are over 40 species of scleractinian corals and three species of Millepora. Live scleractinian species are found throughout the Virgin Islands, but mainly around Buck Island, St. Croix and St. John. More specifically based on a survey from 2001-2006, listed are a total of 215 fishes from St. John and 202 from St. Croix. Four species of sea turtles are found within the Virgin Islands. The coral reefs are impacted by freshwater environments from the Amazon and Orinoco River in the form of anticyclonic rings which are rich in nutrients.

== Hazards ==
This marine environment has been degraded in a variety of ways. Corals have been experiencing an increasing number of diseases. There is black-band disease which infects major coral reefs such as Montastraea annularis. The most severe diseases are stony coral tissue loss disease, the white-band and white plague disease. The branching acroporid have been influenced the most by elevated sea temperatures that lead to bleaching and mortality.

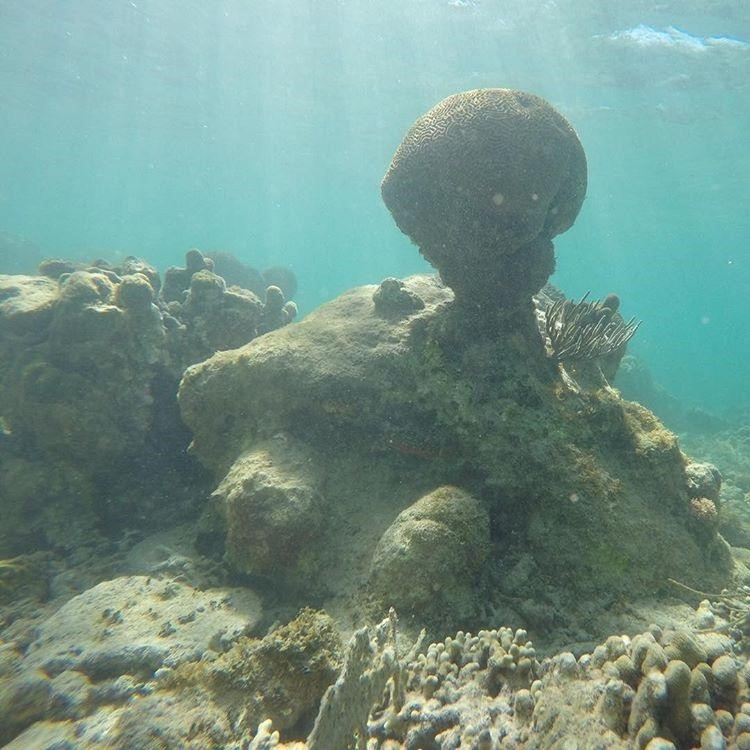
Corals picture taken from Brewers Bay on St. Thomas

Other than the few diseases listed, other ways in which the corals have been affected are by natural disasters such as hurricanes, human influence such as fishing and pollution, and global warming that leads to coral bleaching.
The Coral reefs are also being degraded by many other factors:

- Natural Disasters: coral reefs experience natural disturbance events that can affect and dramatically altered the reef ecosystem. Disasters include hurricanes, earthquakes and tsunamis.
- Tourism: The United States Virgin Islands are a popular tourist destination with over two million cruise ship passenger arrivals per year. Tourism generates vast amounts of income for USVI, however, tourism pressures can cause physical damage to the coral reefs. For example, recreation activities (scuba diving and snorkeling), disposal of untreated sewage and poorly placed boat anchors by cruise ships.
- Coastal development: tourism leads to construction projects such as building of hotels and restaurants, coral reefs habitats are destroyed or disturbed by dredging activities and nutrients and sediment run-off.
- Pollution: Pollution from human activities is damaging reefs. Humans dispose unwanted items on beaches, in the sea or near water pathways.
- Overfishing and destructive fishing methods: the coral reefs have been heavily fished due to increasing demand for food. Overfishing of important reef species negatively impact the coral reefs’ biodiversity and ecological. Additionally, some destructive means of fishing are used on coral reefs including dynamite and cyanide. These practices often kill fishes and destroy fragile coral reefs. Degrading the coral reef habitat on which the fishes rely on will in turn reduce the productivity of the area.
- One of the ways in which the corals have been affected is by the dust from Africa. This dust might be affected the corals by causing degradation.
