= New Caledonian barrier reef =

Barrier reef in the South Pacific

Lagoons of New Caledonia: Reef Diversity and Associated Ecosystems
UNESCO World Heritage Site
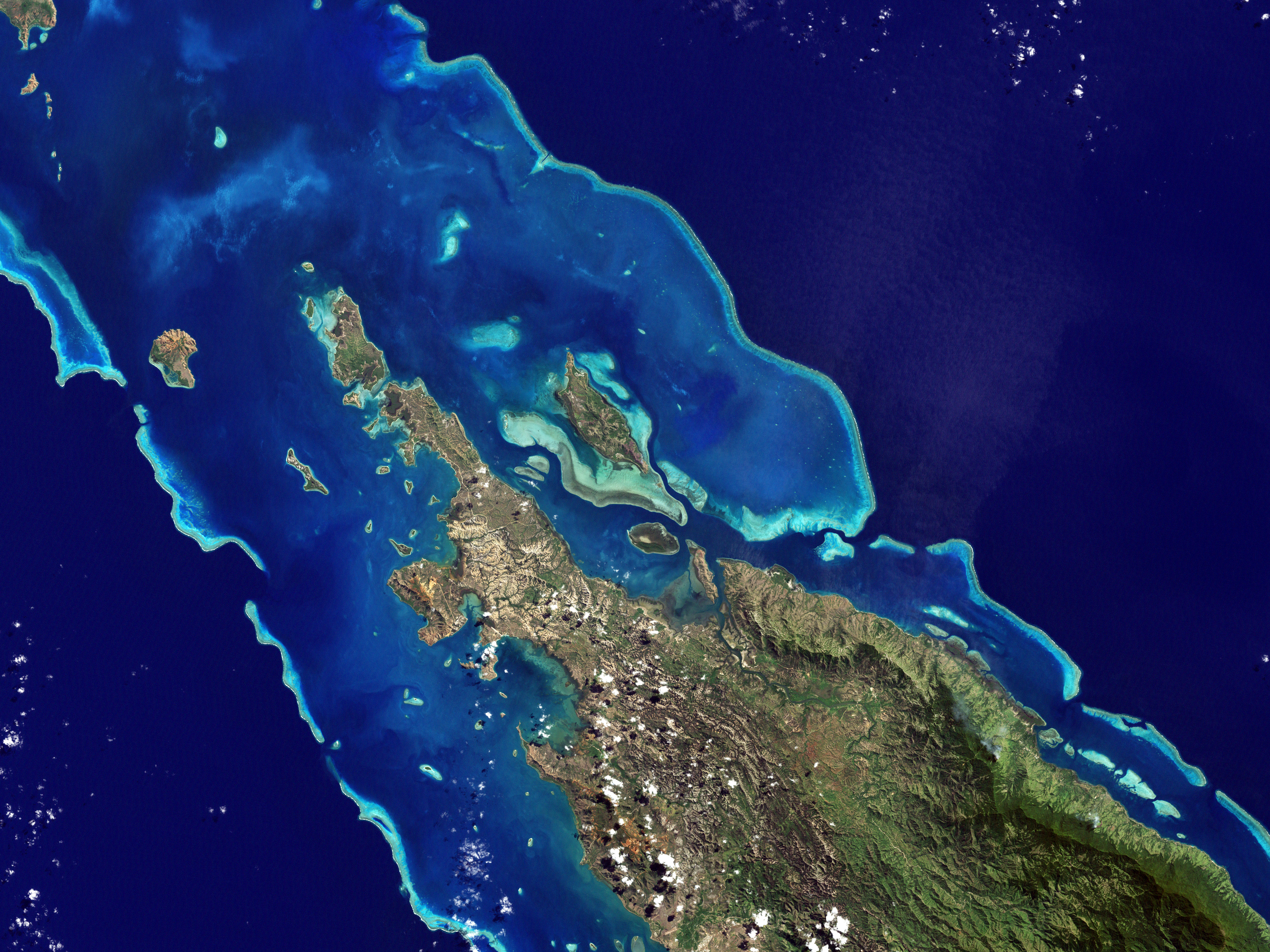
- Northern tip of Grande Terre

- Location within New Caledonia Location within Oceania
- Location: New Caledonia (state party: France)
- Includes: 1. Grand Lagon Sud; 2. Zone Côtière Ouest; 3. Zone Côtière Nord-Est; 4. Grand Lagon Nord; 5. Atolls d'Entrecasteaux; 6. Atoll d’Ouvéa et Beautemps-Beaupré
- Criteria: Natural: (vii), (ix), (x)
- Reference: 1115
- Inscription: 2008 (32nd Session)
- Area: 1,574,300 ha (3,890,000 acres)
- Buffer zone: 1,287,100 ha (3,180,000 acres)
- Coordinates: 20°24′43″S 164°33′59″E

The New Caledonian barrier reef is a barrier reef located in New Caledonia in the South Pacific, being the longest continuous barrier reef in the world and the third largest after the Great Barrier Reef of Australia and the Mesoamerican Barrier Reef.

The New Caledonian barrier reef surrounds Grande Terre, New Caledonia's largest island, as well as the Ile des Pins and several smaller islands, reaching a length of 1,500 kilometres (930 mi). The reef encloses a lagoon of 24,000 square kilometres (9,300 sq mi), which has an average depth of 25 metres (82 ft). The reefs lie up to 30 kilometres (19 mi) from the shore, but extend almost 200 kilometres (120 mi) to the Entrecasteaux Reefs in the northwest. This northwestern extension encloses the Belep Islands and other sand cays. Several natural passages open out to the ocean. The Boulari passage, which leads to Nouméa, the capital and chief port of New Caledonia, is marked by the Amédée lighthouse.

In 2008, the barrier reef and its enclosing lagoon was inscribed on the UNESCO World Heritage List for its outstanding beauty, its unique geography as a reef entirely encircling Grande Terre, and its exceptional marine diversity (in particular its coral diversity).

== Ecology ==
The reef systems of New Caledonia are considered to be the second largest in the world after the Great Barrier Reef of Australia, the longest continuous barrier reef in the world with a length of 1,600 km and its lagoon, the largest in the world with an area of 24,000 square kilometers. This ecosystem hosts along with Fiji, the world's most diverse concentration of reef structures, 146 types based on a global classification system, and they equal or even surpass the much larger Great Barrier Reef in coral and fish diversity.

The reef has great species diversity with a high level of endemism. In total, there have been 2328 fish species observed in the reef, belonging to 248 families. In addition, the reef is home to third-largest population of endangered dugongs (Dugong dugon) on Earth, and is an important nesting site for green sea turtles (Chelonia mydas).

In the lagoons of New Caledonia there are many other marine species, including over 2000 species of molluscs and a thriving population of humpback whales.

== Environmental threats ==
Most of the reefs are generally thought to be in good health. Some of the eastern reefs have been damaged by effluent from nickel mining on Grand Terre. Sedimentation from mining, agriculture, and grazing has affected reefs near river mouths, which has been worsened by the destruction of mangrove forests, which help to retain sediment. Some reefs have been buried under several metres of silt. In 2008, an assessment of northwest near-shore reefs concluded that many would be dead within years, and at best decades, if present trends relating to mining sediment and silt run-off continued.

In January 2002, the French government proposed listing New Caledonia's reefs as a UNESCO World Heritage Site. UNESCO listed New Caledonia barrier reef on the World Heritage List under the name The Lagoons of New Caledonia: Reef Diversity and Associated Ecosystems on 7 July 2008.

There are 13 local management committees, composed of tourist operators, fishermen, politicians and chiefs of local tribes, which work with the community to monitor the health of the lagoons.

== Human use ==
Scuba Diving is common, with several dive sites in the lagoon and around the reef. These include the Prony needle, the Shark Pit and the Cathedral.

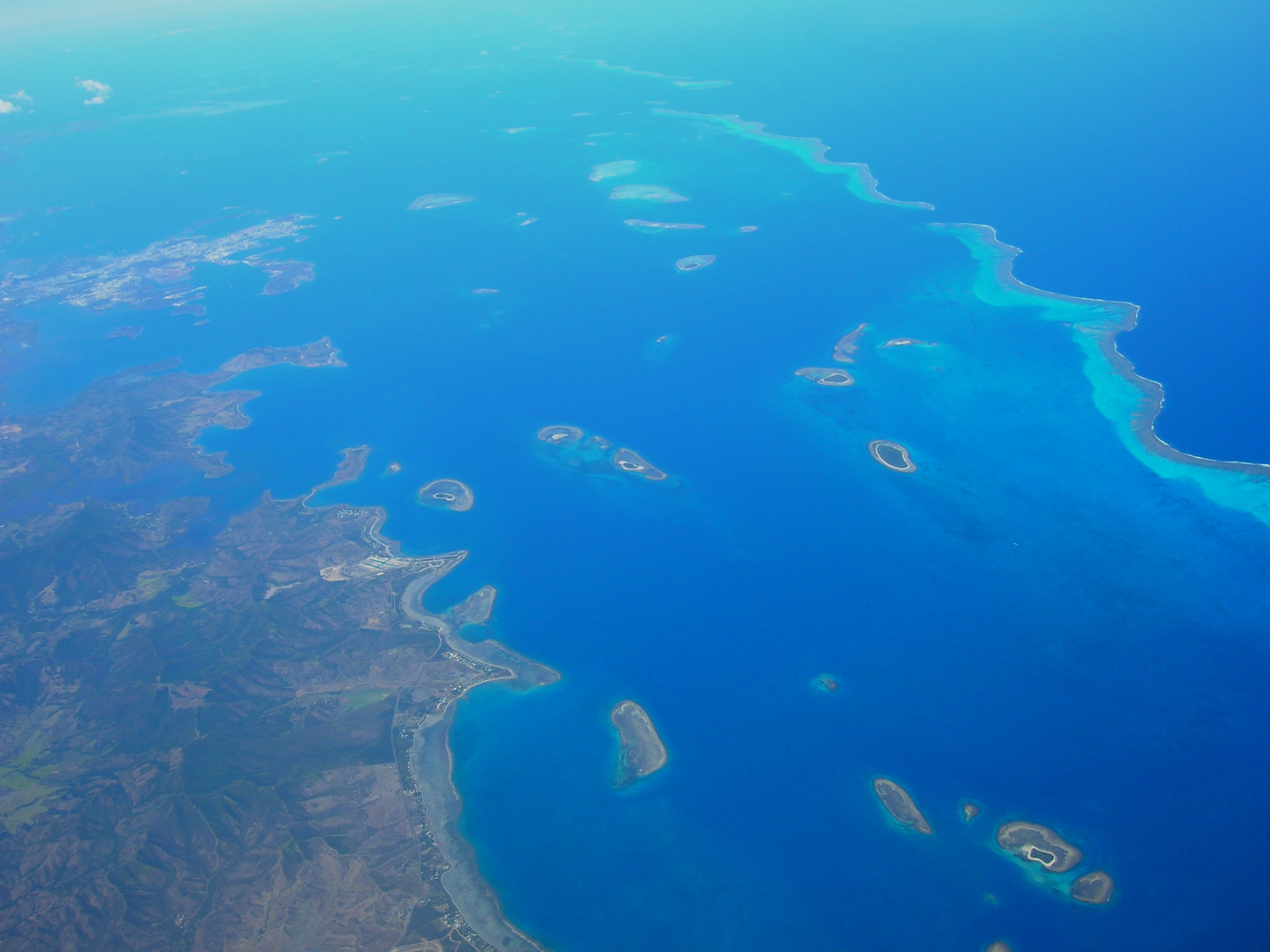
This part of the lagoon, near Dumbéa and Païta, in the North-West of Nouméa, is not included in the UNESCO world heritage sites.

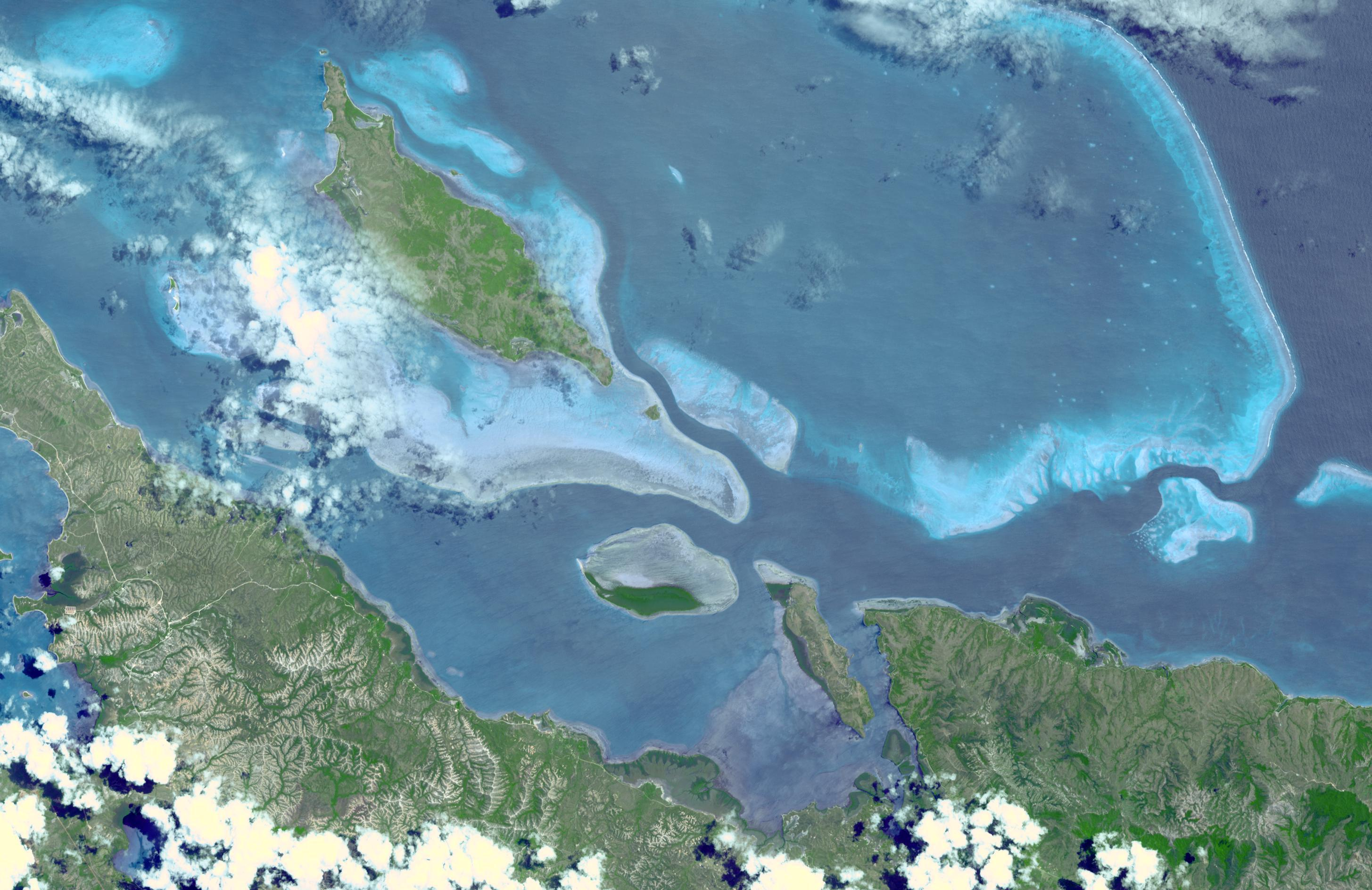
ASTER image of the lagoons

== See also ==
- List of reefs
