= Arrecifes de Cozumel National Park =

Marine protected area in the Cozumel reef system off Mexico

- IUCN category II (national park)
- Location within Mexico
- Interactive map of Arrecifes de Cozumel National Park
- Location: Cozumel, Quintana Roo, Mexico
- Nearest city: San Miguel de Cozumel, Quintana Roo, Mexico
- Coordinates: 20°17′37″N 87°01′29″W
- Area: 120 km^{2} (46 sq mi)
- Established: July 19, 1996
- Governing body: Secretariat of the Environment and Natural Resources

Ramsar Wetland
- Official name: Parque Nacional Arrecifes de Cozumel
- Designated: 2 February 2005
- Reference no.: 1449

The Arrecifes de Cozumel National Park is off the coast of the island of Cozumel in the state of Quintana Roo, Mexico. The Cozumel reef system is part of the Mesoamerican Barrier Reef System, the second largest coral reef system in the world. Even though almost the entire island of Cozumel is surrounded by coral reefs, the park only encompasses the reefs on the south side of the island. It begins just south of the International Pier and continues down and around Punta Sur and up just a small portion of the east side of the island. The park contains both shallow and mesophotic coral reefs and extends to the 100 m depth isobar.

This park is protected under the Ramsar Convention along with Manglares y Humedales del Norte de Isla Cozumel, they both are included in the UNESCO protected area called Isla Cozumel Biosphere Reserve, Mexico.

== Location ==
The park is located in the municipality of Cozumel in the state of Quintana Roo, Mexico. It is about 20 kilometers (12 mi) off the east coast of the Yucatán Peninsula in the Caribbean Sea.

== History ==
On July 19, 1996, under the direction of president Ernesto Zedillo Ponce de León, Arrecifes de Cozumel was declared a National Marine Park. The park size is 120 square kilometres (46 sq mi).

== Biodiversity ==
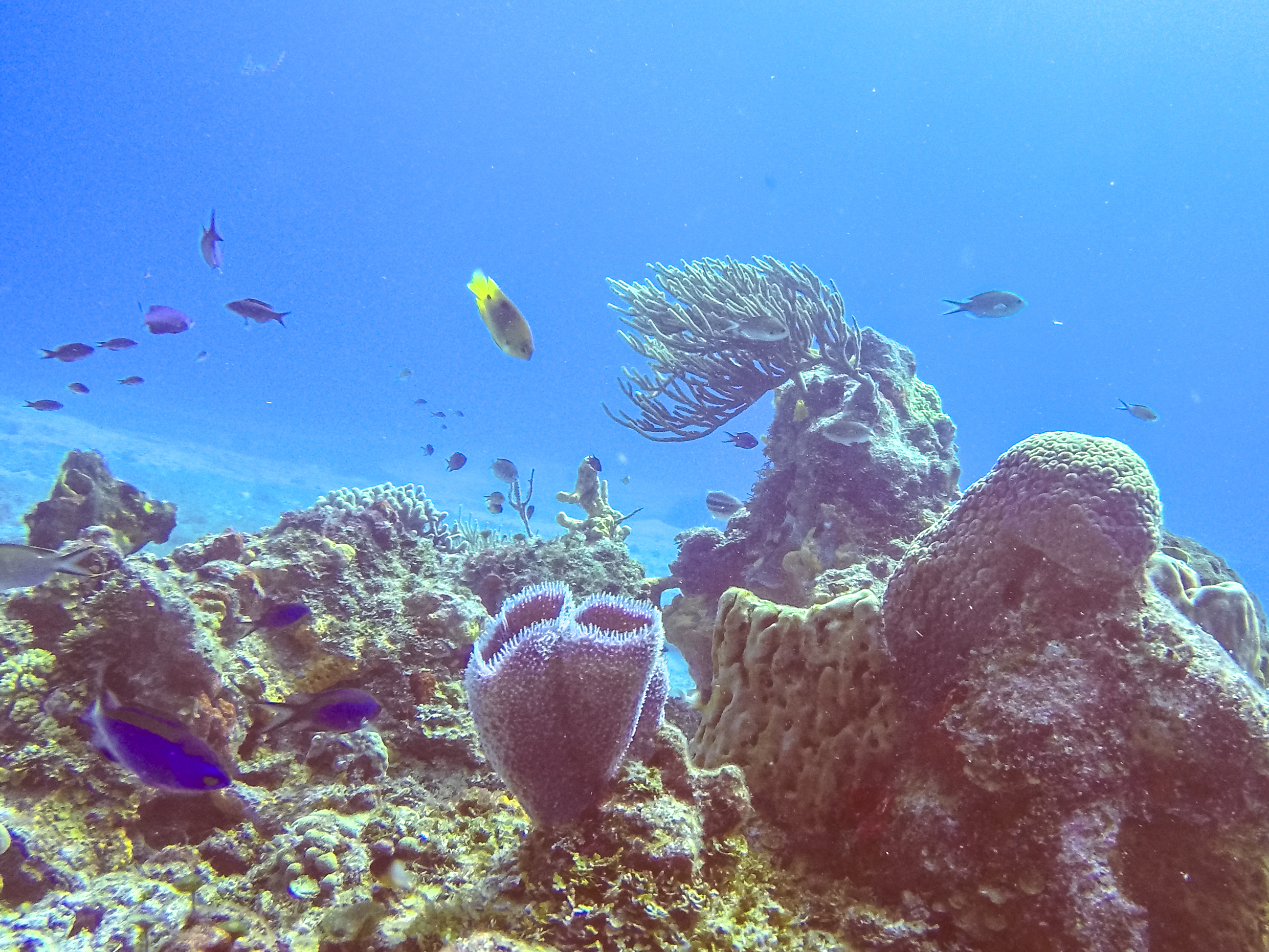
Coral reefs and marine life in Arrecifes de Cozumel National Park

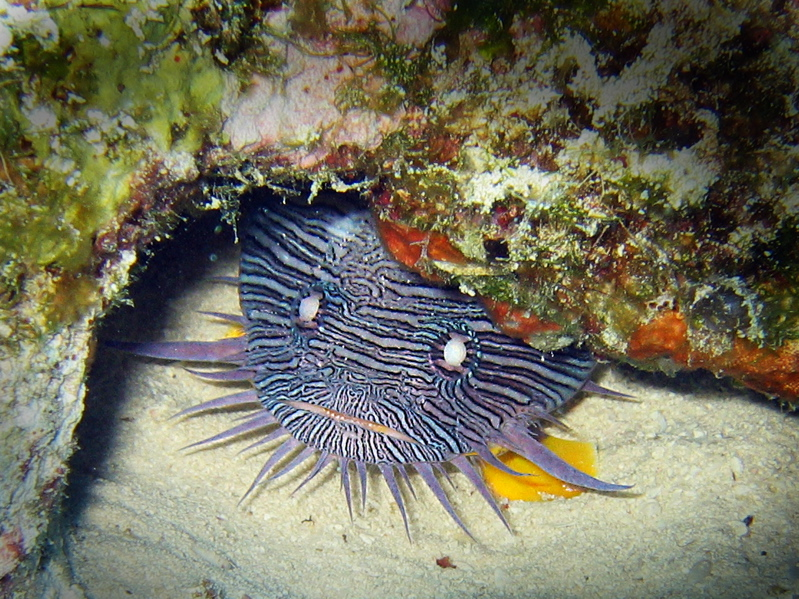
The Cozumel splendid toadfish

Arrecifes de Cozumel National Park is part of a diverse ecosystem of coral reefs that is home to more than 1,000 marine species. The reefs are primarily found on underwater cliffs, there are also some in coastal lagoons and on sand bars at the north tip of the island. Cozumel's deeper coral reefs were historically famed for their black corals, yet black coral populations declined from the 1960s to the mid-1990s because of overharvesting and by 2016 had not recovered. The reefs there are made up of hard coral and soft coral. The marine life that inhibit the reefs include zoanthids, polychaets, actinarians, hydroids, sponges, crustaceans, mollusks, echinoderms and many varieties of Caribbean fish. The park is also a habitat to several endangered marine species such as the loggerhead and hawksbill sea turtles, queen triggerfish, and the endemic splendid toadfish. Due to the abundant marine life and coral reefs the clear and warm Caribbean water, Cozumel is considered one of the best scuba-diving destinations in the world.

It is also home to the Cozumel splendid toadfish (Sanopus splendidus) which is listed as vulnerable by IUCN and is entirely endemic to the reefs surrounding the island. The park also has several species that are under some degree of protection, including sea turtles (green turtle, loggerhead sea turtle, and the hawksbill sea turtle), the queen conch, and black coral.

== See also ==
- List of reefs
