= Isla Contoy =

Island off the Yucatán Peninsula, Mexico

- IUCN category II (national park)
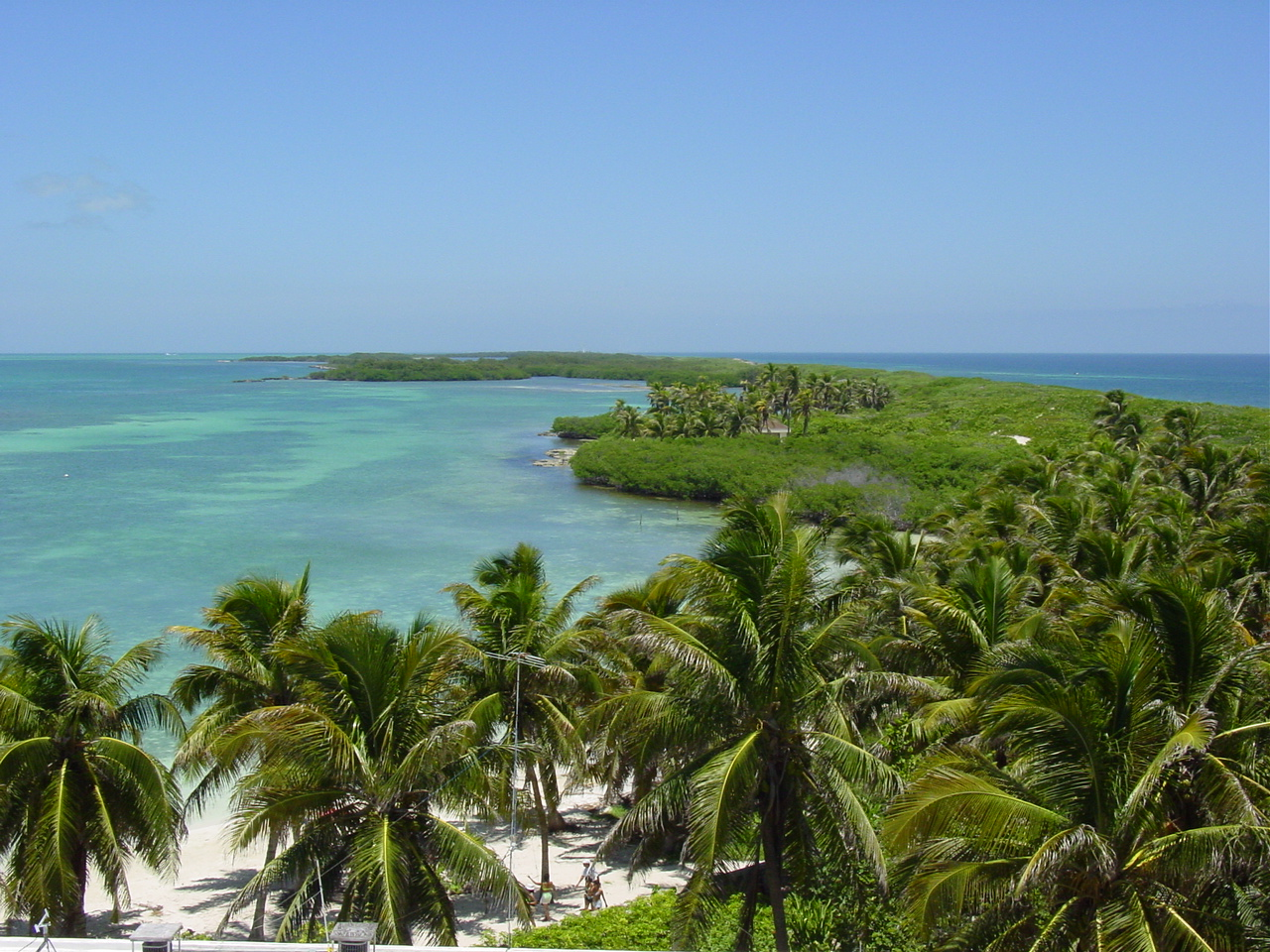
- Interactive map of Isla Contoy
- Location: Isla Contoy, Isla Mujeres Municipality, Quintana Roo, Mexico
- Coordinates: 21°30′23″N 86°47′54″W
- Established: February 1998
- Governing body: Secretariat of the Environment and Natural Resources

Ramsar Wetland
- Official name: Parque Nacional Isla Contoy
- Designated: 27 November 2003
- Reference no.: 1323

Isla Contoy is a small island in the Mexican state of Quintana Roo, approximately 30 kilometers north of Isla Mujeres. The island is only 8.5 km (5.3 mi) in length and has an area of 3.17 square kilometres (1.22 sq mi).

Since 1961, Isla Contoy is protected by the Mexican government and was declared a national park in February 1998. The island is jointly run by the Isla Mujeres-based non-governmental organization, Amigos de Isla Contoy A.C. and the Secretary of Environment, Natural Resources and Fishing (SEMARNAT).

Supervised eco-tourism and regulated commercial fishing is allowed on and near the island. Only a few tour companies have permission to bring the only at maximum 200 daily visitors to Isla Contoy. Visitors need to apply for permission to visit the island at the park offices in Isla Mujeres or Cancún.

Four species of turtle find a safe haven for nesting on the beaches of the island, namely the loggerhead turtle, green turtle, hawksbill turtle, and the leatherback turtle. The reserve is also a sanctuary to approximately 152 tropical marine birds, like the frigate bird, brown pelican, and the double-crested cormorant.
