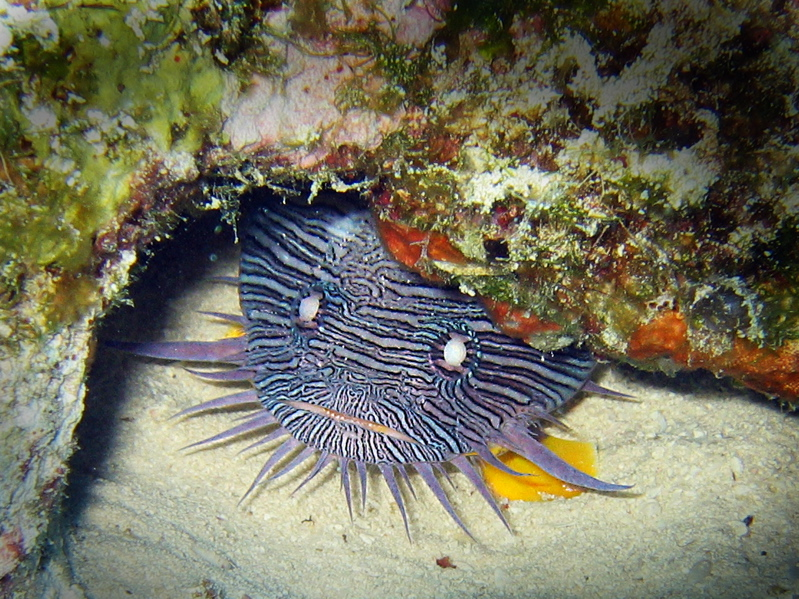

Conservation status
- Endangered (IUCN 3.1)

Scientific classification
- Kingdom: Animalia
- Phylum: Chordata
- Class: Actinopterygii
- Order: Batrachoidiformes
- Family: Batrachoididae
- Genus: Sanopus
- Species: S. splendidus

Binomial name
- Sanopus splendidus Collette, Starck & P. C. Phillips, 1974

= Splendid toadfish =

Species of fish

The splendid toadfish (Sanopus splendidus) also called the coral toadfish and the Cozumel splendid toadfish is a species of toadfish once believed to be entirely endemic to the island of Cozumel but have been found on the reefs of Honduras all the way up to Cancun. Commonly found under coral outcroppings. Dens can be spotted by the sloping sand patch. They are very difficult to coax out in the open.

Unlike any other member of the toadfish family, the splendid toadfish is distinctive for its vibrant colors. It has bright yellow fins which also contain distinctive patterning, while its head contains dark and white stripes.

The species has a total of eight fins; two dorsal fins, two pectoral fins, two pelvic fins, a caudal fin and an anal fin. The midline of the upper body contains the two dorsal fins; a short fin with sharp spines in 3 spots and a long fin which extends over much of the upper body and is flowing. Two rounded pectoral fins are found behind the head, and they are larger than two smaller pointed pelvic fins positioned right in front of the undersurface. Also on the undersurface, towards the rear, along the tip of the tail, the splendid toadfish has a small and rounded caudal fin. With the exception of the pelvic fins, all the fins are bordered by a bright yellow coloring.

The structural features of the species however are similar to other members in the family, such as the flat and broadened head and barbells. Like most species that dwell close to the sand, the splendid toadfish has eyes located on the top of its head which look directly upwards as there is mostly no need for a horizontal vision. Small and sharp teeth also fill wide jaws.

The splendid toadfish generates a buzzing mating call that can be heard by divers.
