= Figaro (shark) =

- Australian sawtail catshark (F. boardmani)

Scientific classification
- Kingdom: Animalia
- Phylum: Chordata
- Class: Chondrichthyes
- Subclass: Elasmobranchii
- Division: Selachii
- Order: Carcharhiniformes
- Family: Pentanchidae
- Genus: Figaro; Whitley, 1928

Type species
- Pristiurus (Figaro) boardmani Whitley, 1928

Genus of sharks

Figaro is a genus of shark, and part of the family Pentanchidae, the deepwater catsharks. Until 2008, Figaro was generally considered to be a subgenus of Galeus, the sawtail catsharks. The two known species are found off Australia, inhabiting deep, offshore waters on or near the bottom. Figaro contains small, slender, firm-bodied sharks that bear distinctive crests of enlarged, spiny dermal denticles along the dorsal and ventral edges of their short caudal fins. The caudal peduncle is relatively long, such as that the anal and caudal fins are some distance apart. In adult males, the inner margins of the pelvic fins are fused together to form a subtle "apron" over the claspers. F. boardmani is a predator of fishes, crustaceans, and cephalopods, and is oviparous; less is known about the F. striatus. Both are harmless and are of no economic importance.

== Taxonomy ==
Figaro was coined as a subgenus of Pristiurus by Australian ichthyologist Gilbert Percy Whitley in a 1928 issue of the scientific journal Records of the Australian Museum, to contain his newly described species P. boardmani. In 1908, Henry Weed Fowler synonymized Pristiurus with the genus Galeus. Though Whitley elevated Figaro to the rank of full genus in 1939, most authors continued to regard Figaro as a subgenus of Galeus. In 1983, Yuan-Ting Chu and colleagues referenced Figaro to contain Galeus boardmani, Dichichthys melanobranchus (=Parmaturus melanobranchus), and F. piceus (=P. melanobranchus). However, it is uncertain whether they intended to resurrect Figaro or were simply unaware of its synonymy with Galeus, and their use of the ventral denticle crest to define the genus posed taxonomic problems. In 2008, Commonwealth Scientific and Industrial Research Organisation (CSIRO) researchers Daniel Gledhill, Peter Last, and William White resurrected Figaro with additional defining characters, to contain F. boardmani and the new species F. striatus. The genus has since been generally accepted as distinct.

One of the key characteristics of Figaro, the ventral crest of denticles on the caudal fin, is also present in several species of the genus Parmaturus, as well as the Springer's sawtail catshark (G. springeri) and the mouse catshark (G. murinus). Figaro also closely resembles the genus Asymbolus in several morphological characters, including the fusion of the pelvic fin inner margins in adult males. More research is required to elucidate the relationships between Figaro, Galeus, Asymbolus, and Parmaturus.

== Species ==
- Figaro boardmani (Whitley, 1928) (Australian sawtail catshark)
- Figaro striatus Gledhill, Last & W. T. White, 2008 (northern sawtail catshark)

== Distribution and habitat ==
Both Figaro species are endemic to Australian waters, F. boardmani in the south and F. striatus in the northeast. They are deepwater species found on or near the sea floor, inhabiting the outer continental shelf and upper continental slope.

== Description ==
The larger Figaro species, F. boardmani, reaches 61 cm (24 in) long, while the smaller F. striatus reaches 42 cm (17 in) long. Members of this genus closely resemble Galeus, with firm, slender bodies and short heads. The eyes are horizontally oval and equipped with rudimentary nictitating membranes (protective third eyelids); a narrow ridge is found beneath each eye and a tiny spiracle behind. The anterior rims of the nostrils are enlarged into triangular flaps. The mouth is wide, with relatively short furrows at the corners, and contains small multi-cusped teeth. There are five pairs of gill slits.

The first and second dorsal fins are similar in size and shape, and are placed mostly behind the pelvic and anal fins respectively. The space between the dorsal fins is much longer than the length of either dorsal fin base. The pectoral fins are short and broad, while the pelvic and anal fins are low with rather long bases. The pectoral, pelvic, and anal fins are proportionally smaller than in Galeus. Unlike Galeus species, adult males have a slight "apron" formed by the fusion of the pelvic fin inner margins; the apron partially covers the claspers, which taper towards the tip. The caudal peduncle is long, with the anal and caudal fins well-separated. The caudal fin is short, with a small lower lobe and a ventral notch near the tip of the upper lobe. The body and fins are densely covered by tiny, overlapping dermal denticles. In addition, there are enlarged denticles that form prominent saw-like crests on both the dorsal and the ventral edges of the caudal fin. The dorsal coloration consists of dark saddles along the back and tail, which are wider in F. boardmani and thinner in F. striatus. The two species also differ in various morphometric characters, such as in the relative size of the eye.

== Biology and ecology ==
The natural histories of Figaro species are poorly known. F. boardmani feeds mostly on fishes, crustaceans, and cephalopods, and has an oviparous mode of reproduction.

== Human interactions ==
Neither Figaro species is commercially important or significantly threatened by fishing activity, though F. boardmani forms a regular component of bottom trawl bycatch in commercial fisheries within its range. The International Union for Conservation of Nature (IUCN) has listed F. boardmani as Least Concern and F. striatus as Data Deficient. Like other catsharks, Figaro species pose no danger to humans.
