= Dichichthys =

- Parmaturus bigus

Scientific classification
- Kingdom: Animalia
- Phylum: Chordata
- Class: Chondrichthyes
- Subclass: Elasmobranchii
- Division: Selachii
- Order: Carcharhiniformes
- Suborder: Carcharhinoidei
- Family: Dichichthyidae; White, Stewart, O'Neill & Naylor, 2024
- Genus: Dichichthys; W. L. Chan, 1966

Species
- See text

Genus of sharks

Dichichthys is a genus of sharks which is the only genus in the monotypic family Dichichthyidae, the bristle sharks. These sharks are found in the Western Pacific Ocean. Until recently, scientists believed these 5 species were part of the genus Parmaturus, until morphological testing confirmed its placement in its own family. Supraorbital crests on the chondrocranium also distinguish Dichichthys from other catshark genera/families.

== Species ==
Dichichthys contains the following five recognised valid species:

- Dichichthys albimarginatus (Séret & Last, 2007) (Whitetip bristle shark)
- Dichichthys bigus (Séret & Last, 2007) (Beige bristle shark)
- Dichichthys melanobranchus (W. L. Chan, 1966) (Blackgill catshark)
- Dichichthys nigripalatum (Fahmi & Ebert, 2018) (Indonesian filetail catshark)
- Dichichthys satoi (White, Stewart, O'Neill & Naylor, 2024) (Roughback bristle shark)
