= Australian sawtail catshark =

Conservation status
- Least Concern (IUCN 3.1)

Scientific classification
- Kingdom: Animalia
- Phylum: Chordata
- Class: Chondrichthyes
- Subclass: Elasmobranchii
- Division: Selachii
- Order: Carcharhiniformes
- Family: Pentanchidae
- Genus: Figaro
- Species: F. boardmani

Binomial name
- Figaro boardmani (Whitley, 1928)
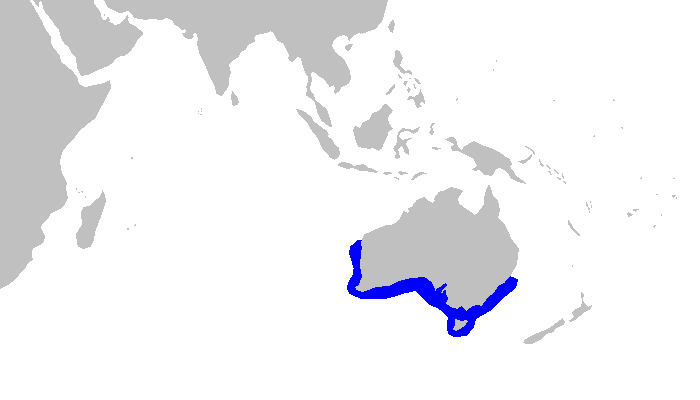
- Range of the Australian sawtail catshark

Synonyms
- Figaro boardmani socius Whitley, 1939; Pristiurus boardmani Whitley, 1928

Species of shark

The Australian sawtail catshark (Figaro boardmani) is a common species of deepwater catshark, belonging to the family Pentanchidae, endemic to southern Australian waters. It is found on or near the bottom of the outer continental shelf and upper continental slope, at depths of 85 to 823 m (279 to 2,700 ft). This slim-bodied species is characterized by crests of enlarged dermal denticles along both the dorsal and ventral edges of its caudal fin and caudal peduncle, along with a color pattern of broad, dark saddles outlined in white. It can grow to 61 cm (24 in) in length. The Australian sawtail catshark feeds mainly on fishes, crustaceans, and cephalopods. Females are oviparous and lay eggs enclosed by capsules. This species is often caught incidentally by commercial bottom trawl fisheries, but is not significantly threatened by fishing activity. Thus, it has been assessed as of Least Concern by the International Union for Conservation of Nature (IUCN).

== Taxonomy ==
Australian ichthyologist Gilbert Percy Whitley originally described the Australian sawtail catshark as Pristiurus boardmani, in a 1928 issue of the scientific journal Records of the Australian Museum, and placed it within his newly created subgenus Figaro. Whitley named the species after his friend and colleague William Boardman, who collected the first known specimens, including the holotype: a 54 cm (21 in) long adult male trawled by the Bar-ea-mul on 18 July 1925, northeast of Montague Island off New South Wales. Another common name for this species is banded shark.

Both Pristiurus and Figaro have generally been considered junior synonyms of the genus Galeus; in 2008, Commonwealth Scientific and Industrial Research Organisation (CSIRO) researchers Daniel Gledhill, Peter Last, and William White resurrected Figaro, with F. boardmani as the type species. Whitley regarded sharks from the Great Australian Bight as representing a distinct subspecies, F. b. socinus, which has not been recognized by subsequent authors. However, individuals from different portions of its range do exhibit minor differences in morphology and coloration, which merit further study.

== Description ==
The maximum known length of the Australian sawtail catshark is 61 cm (24 in). Its slender body is firm and nearly cylindrical in cross-section. The snout is rather short and narrow, with a somewhat angular profile from above. The eyes are horizontally oval and equipped with rudimentary nictitating membranes (protective third eyelids). Beneath the eye is a thin ridge, and behind is a tiny spiracle. The nostrils have triangular flaps of skin in front. The mouth is wide and arched, with furrows of medium length at each corner. The teeth are small, each with a long central cusp and multiple smaller cusplets on each side. There are five pairs of gill slits.

The two dorsal fins have rounded apexes, with the first slightly larger than the second. The first and second dorsal fins originate over the rear of the pelvic fin and anal fins respectively. The pectoral fins are broad and moderate in size. The pelvic fins are small and low with an angular shape; in adult males their inner margins are fused to form a subtle "apron" over the claspers. The anal fin is roughly triangular; its base measures 11% of the total length, exceeding the distance between the pelvic and anal fins but not the distance between the dorsal fins. The caudal fin is short and low, with a small but obvious lower lobe and a ventral notch near the tip of the upper lobe. Small, overlapping dermal denticles cover the body and fins; each denticle has three marginal teeth. In addition, there are enlarged spiny denticles forming prominent crests along the front half of the upper caudal fin edge, and beneath the caudal peduncle to the ventral caudal fin edge. This species is grayish above and light below. Dorsally, there are 12–13 variegated dark saddles or bands along the body and tail, including three saddles before the dorsal fins that are separated by narrow bands. The saddles are highlighted by a lighter edge, and may contain white flecks. The dorsal and pectoral fins are dark at the bases and light at the margins.

== Distribution and habitat ==
Widely distributed off southern Australia, the Australian sawtail catshark has been found from Carnarvon in Western Australia to Noosa in Queensland, including all of Tasmania. This abundant, demersal species inhabits the outer continental shelf and upper continental slope at a depth of 85–823 m (279–2,700 ft).

== Biology and ecology ==
The Australian sawtail catshark has been known to assemble in groups of a single sex. It feeds primarily on fishes, crustaceans, and cephalopods. Reproduction is oviparous, possibly without a well-defined breeding season as is the case in other catsharks. Adult females have a single functional ovary and two functional oviducts; apparently a single egg matures in each oviduct at a time. The eggs are enclosed in capsules measuring 6.8–7.4 cm (2.7–2.9 in) long, 1.9–2.0 cm (0.75–0.79 in) across, and 8–9 cm (3.1–3.5 in) thick. Males and females attain sexual maturity at roughly 40 cm (16 in) and 40–43 cm (16–17 in) long respectively.

== Human interactions ==
The Australian sawtail catshark is a frequent incidental catch of bottom trawl commercial fisheries operating throughout its range, including the Western Australian Deep Water Trawl Fishery, the South East Trawl Fishery, and the Queensland East Coast Trawl Fishery. It may be retained and utilized, but is more commonly discarded; the survival rate of discarded sharks is unknown. This species remains widespread and common, and fishing activities do not appear to pose a substantial threat to its population at present. As a result, the International Union for Conservation of Nature (IUCN) has listed it under Least Concern.
