= Sula Reef =

Deep-water coral reef off the coast of Norway

Coordinates: 64°10′30.92″N 8°17′6.17″W

The Sula Reef (Norwegian: Sularevet) is a deep-water coral reef off the coast of Trøndelag, Norway. It is located on the Sula Ridge, named after the island of Sula. The reef is generated by the coral Lophelia pertusa. It has a length of about 13 kilometers (8.1 mi), and is 700 meters (2,300 ft) wide. The thickness of the reef is up to 35 meters (115 ft). Until the discovery of the Røst Reef in 2002, the Sula Reef was the world's largest known Lophelia reef. The Sula Reef is closed to trawling.
