= Deep-water coral =

Marine invertebrates

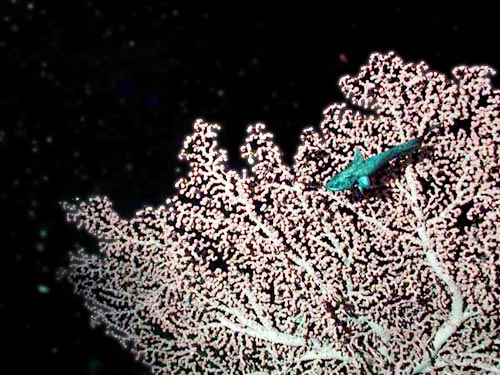
Deep-water coral Paragorgia arborea and a Coryphaenoides fish at a depth of 1,255 m (4,117 ft) on the Davidson Seamount

The habitat of deep-water corals, also known as cold-water corals, extends to deeper, darker parts of the oceans than tropical corals, ranging from near the surface to the abyss, beyond 2,000 metres (6,600 ft) where water temperatures may be as cold as 4 °C (39 °F). Deep-water corals belong to the Phylum Cnidaria and are most often stony corals, but also include black and thorny corals and soft corals including the Gorgonians (sea fans). Like tropical corals, they provide habitat to other species, but deep-water corals do not require zooxanthellae to survive.

While there are nearly as many species of deep-water corals as shallow-water species, only a few deep-water species develop traditional reefs. Instead, they form aggregations called patches, banks, bioherms, massifs, thickets or groves. These aggregations are often referred to as "reefs," but differ structurally and functionally. Deep sea reefs are sometimes referred to as "mounds," which more accurately describes the large calcium carbonate skeleton that is left behind as a reef grows and corals below die off, rather than the living habitat and refuge that deep sea corals provide for fish and invertebrates. Mounds may or may not contain living deep sea reefs.

Submarine communications cables and fishing methods such as bottom trawling tend to break corals apart and destroy reefs. The deep-water habitat is designated as a United Kingdom Biodiversity Action Plan habitat.

== Discovery and study ==
Deep-water corals are enigmatic because they construct their reefs in deep, dark, cool waters at high latitudes, such as Norway's Continental Shelf. They were first discovered by fishermen about 250 years ago, which garnered interest from scientists. Early scientists were unsure how the reefs sustained life in the seemingly barren and dark conditions of the northerly latitudes. It was not until modern times, when crewed mini-submarines first reached sufficient depth, that scientists began to understand these organisms. Pioneering work by Wilson (1979) shed light on a colony on the Porcupine Bank, off Ireland. The first ever live video of a large deep-water coral reef was obtained in July, 1982, when Statoil surveyed a 15 metres (49 ft) tall and 50 metres (160 ft) wide reef perched at 280 metres (920 ft) water depth near Fugløy Island, north of the Polar Circle, off northern Norway.

During their survey of the Fugløy reef, Hovland and Mortensen also found seabed pockmark craters near the reef. Since then, hundreds of large deep-water coral reefs have been mapped and studied. About 60 percent of the reefs occur next to or inside seabed pockmarks. Because these craters are formed by the expulsion of liquids and gases (including methane), several scientists hypothesize that there may be a link between the existence of the deep-water coral reefs and nutrients seepage (light hydrocarbons, such as methane, ethane, and propane) through the seafloor. This hypothesis is called the 'hydraulic theory' for deep-water coral reefs.

Lophelia communities support diverse marine life, such as sponges, polychaete worms, mollusks, crustaceans, brittle stars, starfish, sea urchins, bryozoans, sea spiders, fish, and many other vertebrate and invertebrate species.

The first international symposium for deep-water corals took place in Halifax, Canada in 2000. The symposium considered all aspects of deep-water corals, including protection methods.

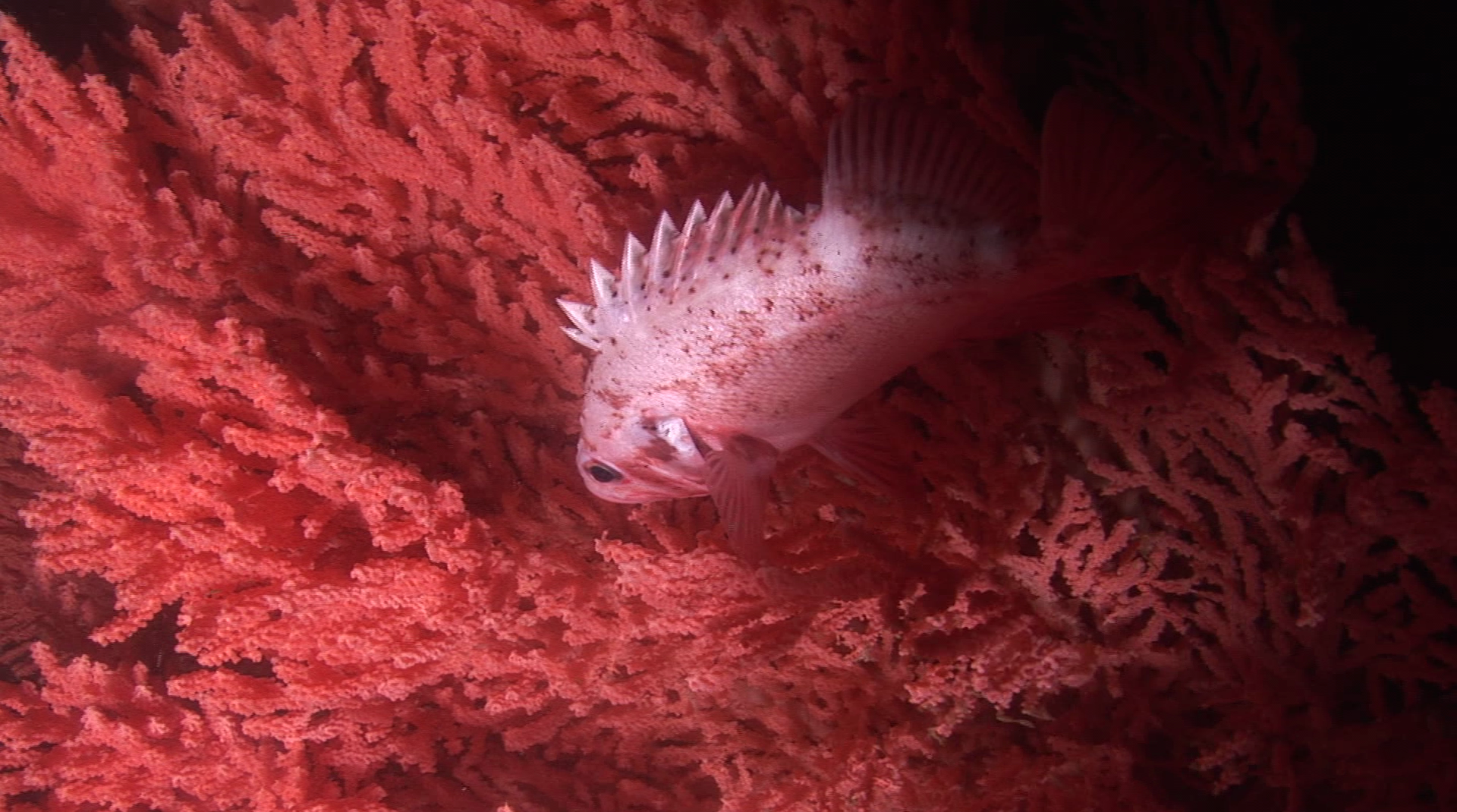
A rockfish hides in a red tree coral (Primnoa pacifica) in Juan Perez Sound in Haida Gwaii, British Columbia.

In June 2009, Living Oceans Society led the Finding Coral Expedition on Canada's Pacific coast in search of deep sea corals. Using one person submarines, a team of international scientists made 30 dives to depths of over 500 metres (1,600 ft) and saw giant coral forests, darting schools of fish, and a seafloor carpeted in brittle stars. During this expedition, scientists identified 16 species of corals. This research was the culmination of five years of work to secure protection from the Canadian Government for these slow-growing and long-lived animals, which provide critical habitat for fish and other marine creatures.

== Taxonomy ==
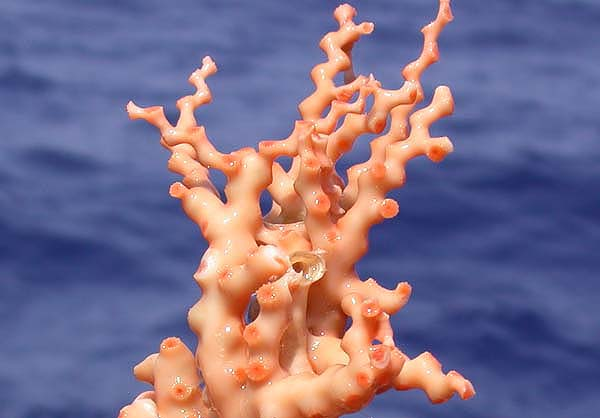
A specimen of Madrepora oculata coral, collected off the coast of South Carolina.

Corals are animals in the phylum Cnidaria and the class Anthozoa. Anthozoa is broken down into two subclasses Octocorals (Alcyonaria) and Hexacorals (Zoantharia). Octocorals are soft corals such as sea pens. Hexacorals include sea anemones and hard bodied corals. Octocorals contain eight body extensions while Hexacorals have six. Most deep-water corals are stony corals.

== Distribution ==
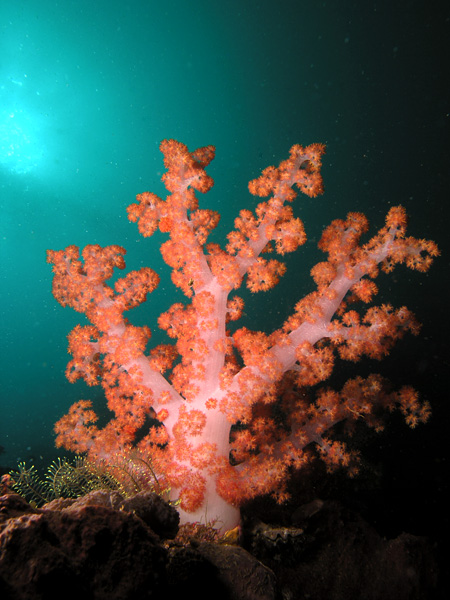
Soft octocoral

Deep-water corals are widely distributed in Earth's oceans, with large reefs/beds in the far North and far South Atlantic, as well as in areas with warmer water such as along the Florida coast. In the north Atlantic, the principal coral species that contribute to reef formation are Lophelia pertusa, Oculina varicosa, Madrepora oculata, Desmophyllum cristagalli, Enallopsammia rostrata, Solenosmilia variabilis, and Goniocorella dumosa. Four genera (Lophelia, Desmophyllum, Solenosmilia, and Goniocorella) constitute most deep-water coral banks at depths of 400–700 metres (1,300–2,300 ft).

Madrepora oculata occurs as deep as 2,020 metres (6,630 ft) and is one of a dozen species that occur globally and in all oceans, including the Subantarctic (Cairns, 1982). Colonies of Enallopsammia contribute to the framework of deep-water coral banks found at depths of 600 to 800 metres (2,000–2,600 ft) in the Straits of Florida (Cairns and Stanley, 1982).

=== Lophelia pertusa distribution ===
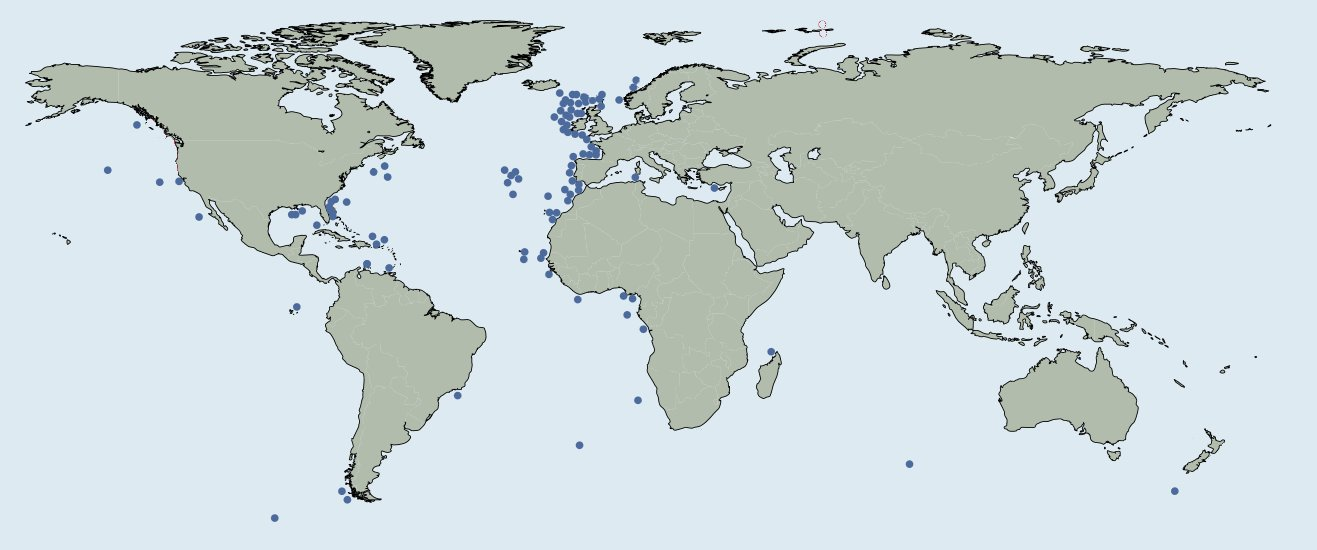
Global distribution of Lophelia pertusa

One of the most common species, Lophelia pertusa, lives in the Northeast and Northwest Atlantic Ocean, Brazil and off Africa’s west coast.

Aside from ocean bottoms, scientists found Lophelia colonies on North Sea oil installations. However, oil and gas production may introduce harmful substances into the local environment.

The world's largest known deep-water Lophelia coral complex is the Røst Reef. It lies between 300 and 400 metres (980 and 1,310 ft) deep, west of Røst island in the Lofoten archipelago, in Norway, inside the Arctic Circle. Discovered during a routine survey in May 2002, the reef is still largely intact. It is approximately 35 kilometres (22 mi) long by 3 kilometres (1.9 mi) wide.

Some 500 kilometres (310 mi) further south is the Sula Reef, located on the Sula Ridge, west of Trondheim on the mid-Norwegian Shelf, at 200–300 metres (660–980 ft). It is 13 kilometres (8.1 mi) long, 700 metres (2,300 ft) wide, and up to 35 metres (115 ft) high, an area one-tenth the size of the 100 square kilometres (39 mi^{2}) Røst Reef.

Discovered and mapped in 2002, Norway's Tisler Reef is situated in the Skagerrak, marking the submarine border between Norway and Sweden. It rests at a depth of 90–120 meters (300–390 feet) and spans an area of approximately 2 by 0.2 kilometers (1.24 by 0.12 miles). It is estimated to be 8600–8700 years old. The Tisler Reef contains the world's only known yellow L. pertusa. Elsewhere in the northeastern Atlantic, Lophelia is found around the Faroe Islands, an island group between the Norwegian Sea and the Northeast Atlantic Ocean. At depths from 200 to 500 metres (660 to 1,640 ft), L. pertusa is chiefly on the Rockall Bank and on the shelf break north and west of Scotland. The Porcupine Seabight, the southern end of the Rockall Bank, and the shelf to the northwest of County Donegal all exhibit large, mound-like Lophelia structures. One of them, the Therese Mound, is particularly noted for its Lophelia pertusa and Madrepora oculata colonies. Lophelia reefs are also found along the U.S. East Coast at depths of 500–850 metres (1,640–2,790 ft) along the base of the Florida-Hatteras slope. South of Cape Lookout, NC, rising from the flat sea bed of the Blake Plateau, is a band of ridges capped with thickets of Lophelia. These are the northernmost East Coast Lophelia pertusa growths. The coral mounds and ridges here rise as much as 150 metres (490 ft) from the plateau plain. These Lophelia communities lie in unprotected areas of potential oil and gas exploration and cable-laying operations, rendering them vulnerable to future threats.

Lophelia exist around the Bay of Biscay, the Canary Islands, Portugal, Madeira, the Azores, and the western basin of the Mediterranean Sea.

==== Darwin Mounds ====
Among the most researched deep-water coral areas in the United Kingdom are the Darwin Mounds. Atlantic Frontier Environmental Network (AFEN) discovered them in 1998 while conducting large-scale regional sea floor surveys north of Scotland. They discovered two areas of hundreds of sand and deep-water coral mounds at depths of about 1,000 metres (3,300 ft) in the northeast corner of the Rockall Trough, approximately 185 kilometres (115 mi) northwest of the northwest tip of Scotland. Named after the research vessel Charles Darwin, the Darwin Mounds have been extensively mapped using low-frequency side-scan sonar. They cover an area of approximately 100 square kilometres (39 mi^{2}) and consist of two main fields—the Darwin Mounds East, with about 75 mounds, and the Darwin Mounds West, with about 150 mounds. Other mounds are scattered in adjacent areas. Each mound is about 100 metres (330 ft) in diameter and 5 metres (16 ft) high. Lophelia corals and coral rubble cover the mound tops, attracting other marine life. The mounds look like 'sand volcanoes', each with a 'tail', up to several hundred meters long, all oriented downstream. Large congregations of Xenophyophores (Syringammina fragilissima) which are giant unicellular organisms that can grow up to 25 centimetres (9.8 in) in diameter characterize the tails and mounds. Scientists are uncertain why these organisms congregate here. The Darwin Mounds Lophelia grow on sand rather than hard substrate, unique to this area. Lophelia corals exist in Irish waters as well.

=== Oculina varicosa distribution ===
Oculina varicosa is a branching ivory coral that forms giant but slow-growing, bushy thickets on pinnacles up to 30 metres (98 ft) in height. The Oculina Banks, so named because they consist mostly of Oculina varicosa, exist in 50–100 metres (160–330 ft) of water along the continental shelf edge about 42–80 km (26–50 mi) off of Florida's central east coast. The Oculina Banks stretch along 170 kilometers (110 miles) reaching from Fort Pierce to Daytona.

Discovered in 1975 by scientists from the Harbor Branch Oceanographic Institution conducting surveys of the continental shelf, Oculina thickets grow on a series of pinnacles and ridges extending from Fort Pierce to Daytona, Florida Like the Lophelia thickets, the Oculina Banks host a wide array of macroinvertebrates and fishes. They are significant spawning grounds for commercially important food species including gag, scamp, red grouper, speckled hind, black sea bass, red porgy, rock shrimp, and calico scallop.

== Growth and reproduction ==
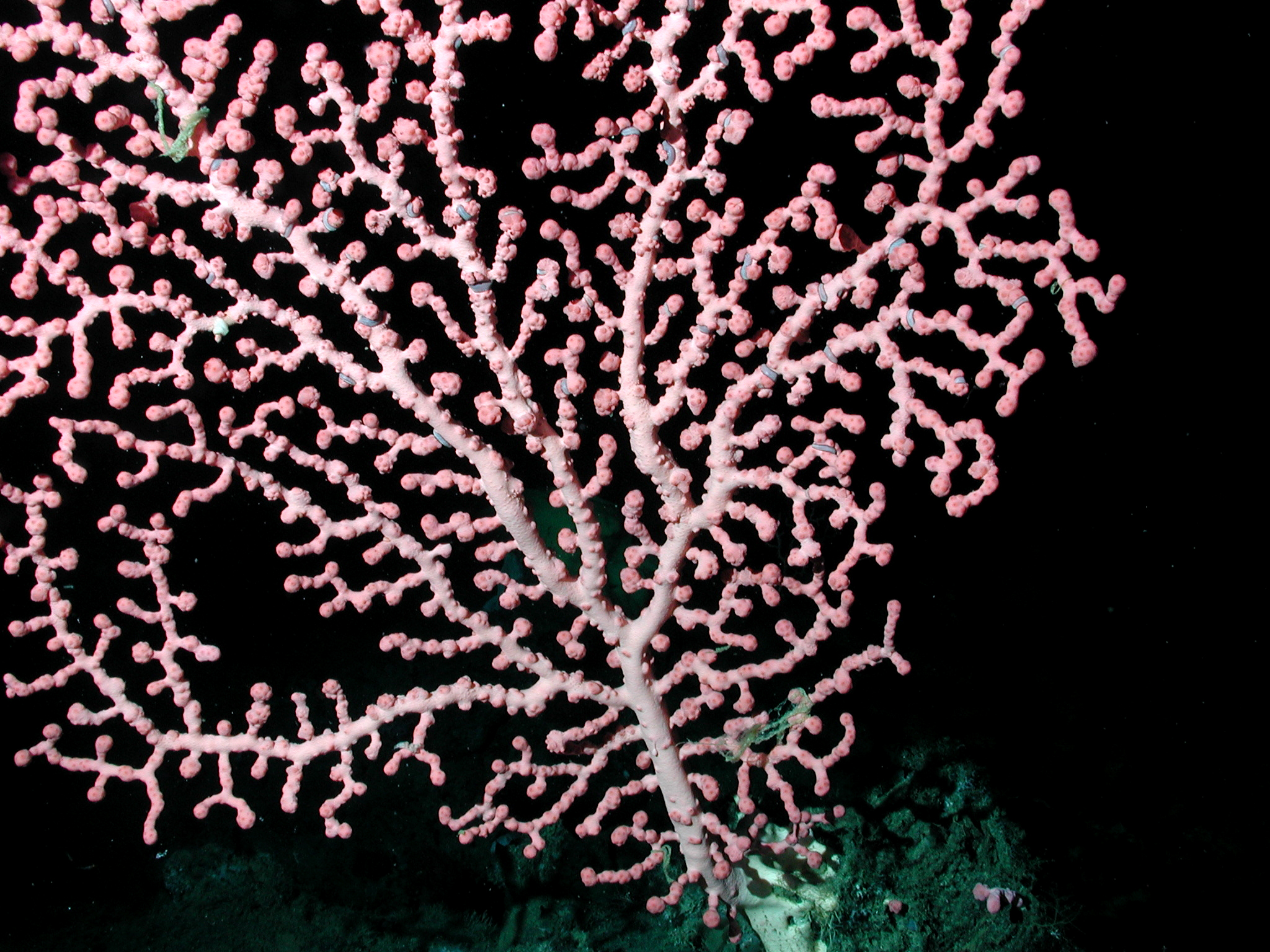
Bubblegum coral (Paragorgia arborea) at 1257 meters water depth (California).

Most corals must attach to a hard surface in order to begin growing, but sea fans can also live on soft sediments. They are often found growing along bathymetric highs such as seamounts, ridges, pinnacles and mounds, on hard surfaces. Corals are sedentary, so they must live near nutrient-rich water currents. Deep-water corals feed on zooplankton and rely on ocean currents to bring food. The currents also aid in cleaning the corals.

Deep-water corals grow more slowly than tropical corals because there are no zooxanthellae to feed them. Lophelia has a linear polyp extension of about 10 millimetres (0.39 in) per year. By contrast, branching shallow-water corals, such as Acropora, may exceed 10–20 cm/yr. Reef structure growth estimates are about 1 millimetre (0.039 in) per year. Scientists have also found Lophelia colonies on oil installations in the North Sea. Using coral age-dating methods, scientists have estimated that some living deep-water corals date back at least 10,000 years.

Deep-water corals use nematocysts on their tentacles to stun prey. Deep-water corals feed on zooplankton, crustaceans and even krill.

Coral can reproduce sexually or asexually. In asexual reproduction (budding) a polyp divides in two genetically identical pieces. Sexual reproduction requires that a sperm fertilize an egg which grows into a larva. Currents then disperse the larvae. Growth begins when the larvae attach to a solid substrate. Old/dead coral provides an excellent substrate for this growth, creating ever higher mounds of coral. As new growth surrounds the original, the new coral intercepts both water flow and accompanying nutrients, weakening and eventually killing the older organisms.

Individual Lophelia pertusa colonies are entirely either female or male.

Deep-water coral colonies range in size from small and solitary to large, branching tree-like structures. Larger colonies support many life forms, while nearby areas have much less. The gorgonian, Paragorgia arborea, may grow beyond three meters. However, little is known of their basic biology, including how they feed or their methods and timing of reproduction.

== Importance ==
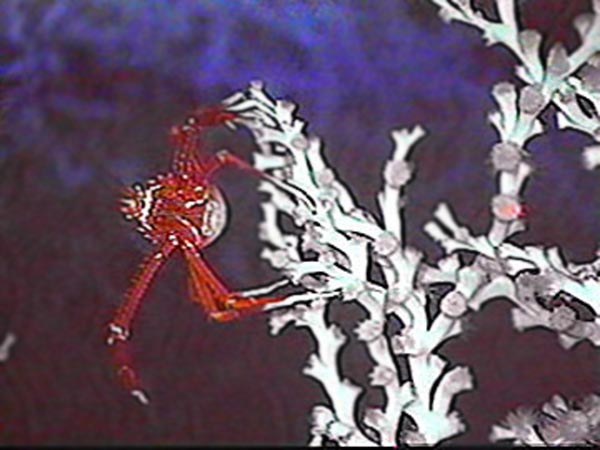
A squat lobster living on a Lophelia reef

Deep sea corals together with other habitat-forming organisms host a rich fauna of associated organisms. Lophelia reefs can host up to 1,300 species of fish and invertebrates. Various fish aggregate on deep sea reefs. Deep sea corals, sponges and other habitat-forming animals provide protection from currents and predators, nurseries for young fish, and feeding, breeding and spawning areas for numerous fish and shellfish species. Rockfish, Atka mackerel, walleye pollock, Pacific cod, Pacific halibut, sablefish, flatfish, crabs, and other economically important species in the North Pacific inhabit these areas. Eighty-three percent of the rockfish found in one study were associated with red tree coral. Flatfish, walleye pollock and Pacific cod appear to be more commonly caught around soft corals. Dense schools of female redfish heavy with young have been observed on Lophelia reefs off Norway, suggesting the reefs are breeding or nursery areas for some species. Oculina reefs are important spawning habitat for several grouper species, as well as other fishes.

== Human impact ==
The primary human impact on deep-water corals is from deep-water trawling. Trawlers drag nets across the ocean floor, disturbing sediments, breaking, and destroying deep-water corals. Additionally, long-line fishing poses another harmful method.

Oil and gas exploration also cause damage to deep-water coral. A 2015 study revealed that observed injury in populations in the Mississippi Canyon in the Gulf of Mexico surged significantly after the Deepwater Horizon oil spill. The injury rates increased from 4 to 9 percent before the spill to 38 to 50 percent after the spill (Etnoyer et al., 2015).

Deep-water corals have a slow growth rate, resulting in a much longer recovery period compared to shallow waters where nutrients and food-providing zooxanthellae are more abundant.

Another study conducted during 2001 to 2003 focused on a reef of Lophelia pertusa in the Atlantic off Canada. This study found that the corals were often broken in unnatural ways, and the ocean floor displayed scars and overturned boulders from trawling.

Apart from managed pressures such as deep-water trawling and oil exploration, deep-water coral reefs are susceptible to unmanaged pressures like ocean acidification. To safeguard these habitats in the long term, methods evaluating the relative risks of different pressures are being advocated.

=== Oculina Banks ===
Bottom trawling and natural causes like bioerosion and episodic die-offs have reduced much of Florida's Oculina Banks to rubble, drastically reducing a once-substantial fishery by destroying spawning grounds.

In 1980, Harbor Branch Oceanographic Institution scientists, such as John Reed, called for protective measures. In 1984, the South Atlantic Fishery Management Council (SAFMC) designated a 315 square kilometres (122 mi^{2}) area as a Habitat Area of Particular Concern. In 1994, an area called the Experimental Oculina Research Reserve was completely closed to bottom fishing. In 1996, the SAFMC prohibited fishing vessels from dropping anchors, grapples, or attached chains there. In 1998, the council also designated the reserve as an Essential Fish Habitat. In 2000, the deep-water Oculina Marine Protected Area was extended to 1,029 square kilometres (397 mi^{2}). Scientists recently deployed concrete reef balls in an attempt to provide habitat for fish and coral.

=== Sula and Røst ===
Scientists estimate that trawling has damaged or destroyed 30 to 50 percent of the Norwegian shelf coral area. The International Council for the Exploration of the Sea, the European Commission’s main scientific advisor on fisheries and environmental issues in the northeast Atlantic, recommend mapping and closing Europe's deep corals to fishing trawlers.

In 1999, the Norwegian Ministry of Fisheries implemented a closure on an expanse of 1,000 square kilometers (390 mi^{2}), which encompassed the expansive Sula Reef, prohibiting bottom trawling. Subsequently, in 2000, an additional area covering roughly 600 square kilometers (230 mi^{2}) was closed off. Then, in 2002, an area of approximately 300 square kilometers (120 mi^{2}) surrounding the Røst Reef was also designated as closed off.

=== Darwin mounds ===
The European Commission introduced an interim trawling ban in the Darwin Mounds area, in August 2003, followed by a permanent closure to bottom trawling in March 2004. The European Commission designated the area as a Site of Community Importance in December 2009, and was designated a Special Area of Conservation by the UK Government in December 2015.

== See also ==
- Coral reef
- Mesophotic coral reef
