= Darwin Mounds =

Undersea sand mounds off the north-west coast of Scotland

Coordinates: 59°45′N 7°13′W

Darwin Mounds is a large field of undersea sand mounds situated off the north west coast of Scotland that were first discovered in May 1998. They provide a unique habitat for ancient deep water coral reefs and were found using remote sensing techniques during surveys funded by the oil industry and steered by the joint industry and United Kingdom government group the Atlantic Frontier Environment Network (AFEN) (Masson and Jacobs 1998). The mounds were named after the research vessel, itself named for the eminent naturalist and evolutionary theorist Charles Darwin.

The mounds are about 1,000 metres (3,300 ft) below the surface of the North Atlantic ocean, approximately 100 nautical miles (190 km) north-west of Cape Wrath, the north-west tip of mainland Scotland. There are hundreds of mounds in the field, which in total cover approximately 100 square kilometres (39 mi^{2}). Individual mounds are typically circular, up to 5 metres (16 ft) high and 100 metres (330 ft) wide. Most of the mounds are also distinguished by the presence of an additional feature referred to as a 'tail'. The tails are of a variable extent and may merge with others, but are generally a teardrop shape and are orientated south-west of the mound. The mound-tail feature of the Darwin Mounds is apparently unique globally.

== Composition ==
The mounds are mostly sand, currently interpreted as "sand volcanoes". These features are caused when fluidised sand "de-waters" and the fluid bubbles up through the sand, pushing the sediment up into a cone shape. Sand volcanoes are common in the Devonian fossil record in UK, and in seismically active areas of the planet. In this case, tectonic activity is unlikely; some form of slumping on the south-west side of the undersea (Wyville-Thomson) Ridge being a more likely cause. The tops of the mounds have living stands of Lophelia and blocky rubble (interpreted as coral debris). The mounds provide one of the largest known northerly cold-water habitats for coral species. The mounds are also unusual in that Lophelia pertusa, a cold water coral, appears to be growing on sand rather than a hard substratum. Prior to research on the mounds in 2000, it was thought that Lophelia required a hard substratum for attachment.

The deep-water coral systems on the mounds are especially fragile. Unlike shallow-water coral reefs, they are not adapted to cope with minor disturbances such as wave action. The mounds also support significant populations of the xenophyophore Syringammina fragilissima. This is a giant single-celled organism (a protozoan) that is widespread in deep waters, but occurs in particularly high densities on the mounds and the tails. Individual xenophyophores can grow to be larger than 20 centimetres (7.9 in) and are often very fragile. The corals themselves provide a habitat for a wide diversity of other marine life including sponges, worms, crustaceans and molluscs. Among these starfish, sea urchins and crabs. Various fish have been observed, including blue ling, roundnose grenadier, and the orange roughy.

== Conservation efforts ==
On 23 October 2001, UK Minister Margaret Beckett made a commitment at WWF's Oceans Recovery Summit in Edinburgh to protect the Darwin Mounds. The summit launched the Edinburgh Declaration, targeting politicians and marine stakeholders alike to sign up to action to safeguard the seas. Deep water bottom trawling had been occurring in the area, with nets as heavy as one tonne dragged across the sea floor. Researcher Jason Hall-Spencer of the University of Glasgow had found pieces of coral at least 4,500 years old in the nets of trawlers operating off the coast of Ireland and Scotland. Pieces of coral up to 1 square metre (11 ft^{2}) were found in the nets of French trawling vessels that had been scraping the seabed 1 kilometre (0.6 mi) down. It is known that much coral was destroyed by these nets and the mounds themselves in some areas were found to be scraped and flattened. The mounds are ancient structures, and this damage is permanent.

After the discovery of the mounds, three well-documented surveys of the area were undertaken, one in June 1998 (Bett 1999), August 1999 (Bett & Jacobs 2000,) and twice during summer 2000 (B. Bett, pers. comm.). Instruments deployed during the studies included side-scan sonar, stills and video cameras and piston corers. However, the entirety of what was lost to heavy-netted fishing trawlers remains unknown. On 22 March 2004 EU Fisheries Ministers in Brussels agreed to give permanent protection to the United Kingdom's unique cold-water coral reefs, recognising the Darwin Mounds as an important habitat. In 2004 deep-water bottom trawling in the area was made illegal.

== See also ==
- List of reefs
