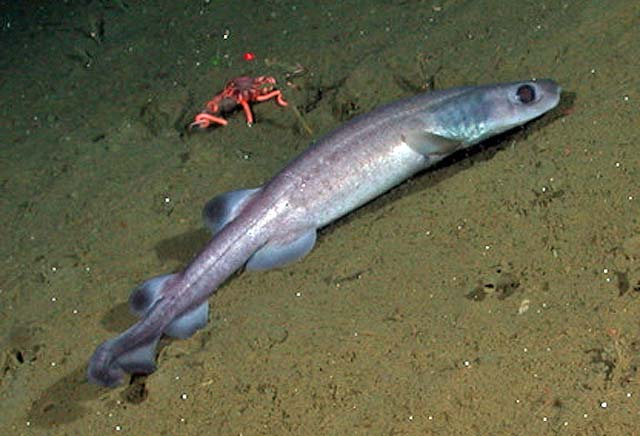

Conservation status
- Least Concern (IUCN 3.1)

Scientific classification
- Kingdom: Animalia
- Phylum: Chordata
- Class: Chondrichthyes
- Subclass: Elasmobranchii
- Division: Selachii
- Order: Carcharhiniformes
- Family: Pentanchidae
- Genus: Parmaturus
- Species: P. xaniurus

Binomial name
- Parmaturus xaniurus (C. H. Gilbert, 1892)
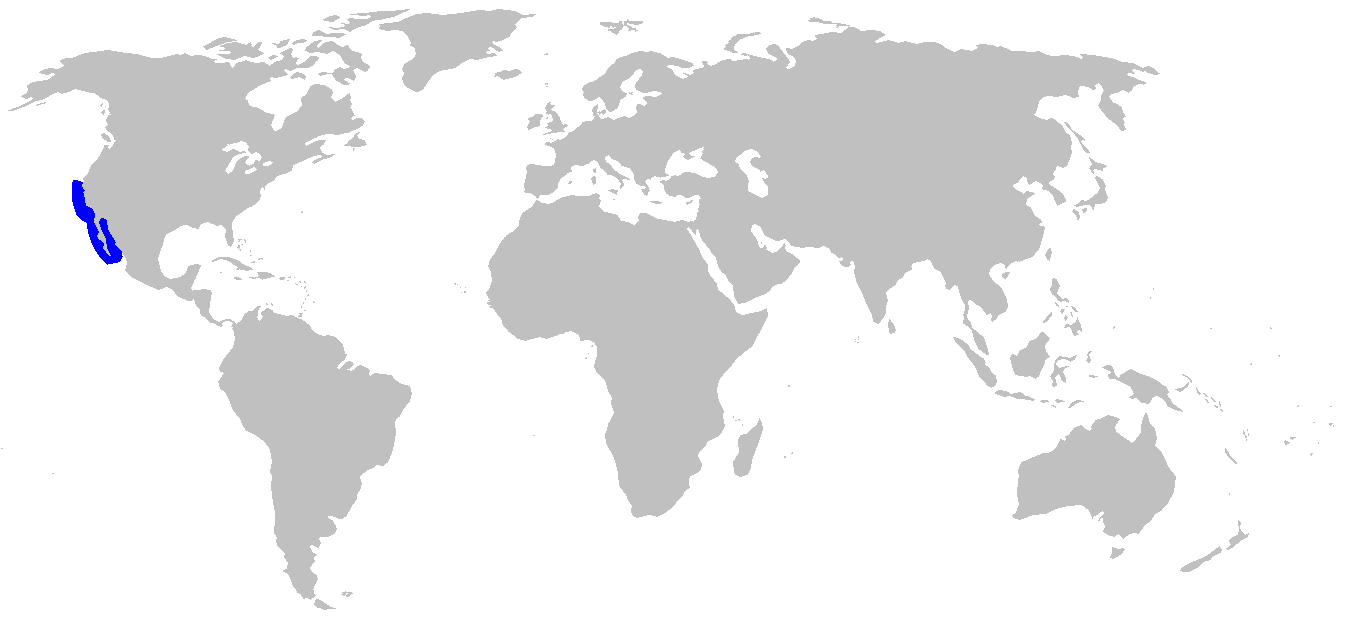
- Range of the filetail catshark

= Filetail catshark =

Species of shark

The filetail catshark (Parmaturus xaniurus) is a species of shark belonging to the family Pentanchidae, the deepwater catsharks. This species is an Eastern Pacific endemic deepwater catshark ranging along the west coast of North America from Washington to the Gulf of California. Its name refers to the toothlike projections on its skin. Nothing was known of its abundance or population structure as of 2003, but it was reported to be fairly common, being one of the most commonly encountered cartilaginous fishes in the annual West Coast Groundfish Bottom Trawl Survey from 2003 to 2011.

Adults are epibenthic and found near areas of rocky vertical relief over soft mud bottoms on the outer continental shelf and upper slope at depths of 91 to 1,251 m. Juveniles are mesopelagic, found around 500 m off the bottom in waters over 1,000 m deep. They have been seen at the Lasuen Knoll during ROV expeditions at roughly 300 m deep. It reaches a maximum size of 61 cm TL.

An oviparous species, females deposit eggcases throughout the year with concentrated reproductive output from July through September. It is not targeted by commercial fisheries or utilized for human consumption, but is known to be incidental catch in longline and bottom trawl fisheries.

== Gallery ==
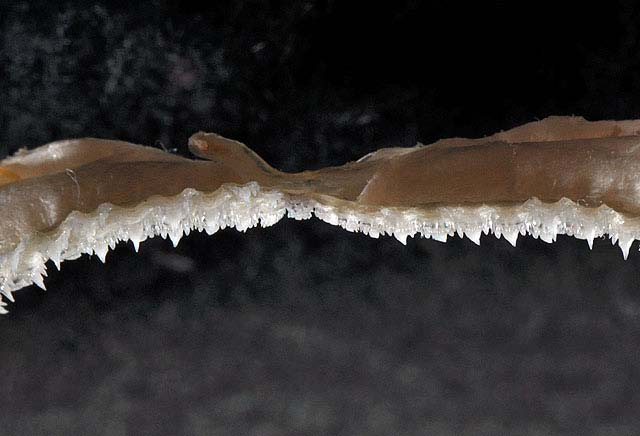
Upper teeth

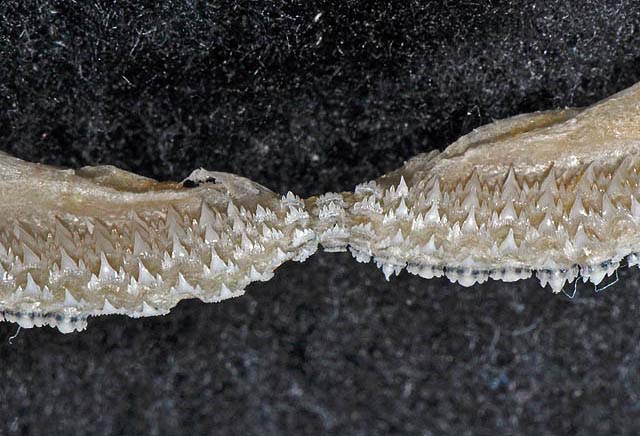
Lower teeth
