= Velvet catshark =

Conservation status
- Least Concern (IUCN 3.1)

Scientific classification
- Kingdom: Animalia
- Phylum: Chordata
- Class: Chondrichthyes
- Subclass: Elasmobranchii
- Division: Selachii
- Order: Carcharhiniformes
- Family: Pentanchidae
- Genus: Parmaturus
- Species: P. lanatus

Binomial name
- Parmaturus lanatus Séret & Last, 2007

Species of shark

The velvet catshark (Parmaturus lanatus) is a species of shark belonging to the family Pentanchidae, the deepwater catsharks. It is known only from a single specimen collected off the Tanimbar Islands in the Arafura Sea, Indonesia, at a depth of 840 to 855 metres (2,756 to 2,805 ft). The only known specimen, a juvenile male, measured a total of 36 centimetres (14 in) in length.

The shark is found in the Western Pacific. It has a depth range of 840 to 855 metres (2,756 to 2,805 ft), making it bathydemersal.
