= Northern sawtail catshark =

Conservation status
- Data Deficient (IUCN 3.1)

Scientific classification
- Kingdom: Animalia
- Phylum: Chordata
- Class: Chondrichthyes
- Subclass: Elasmobranchii
- Division: Selachii
- Order: Carcharhiniformes
- Family: Pentanchidae
- Genus: Figaro
- Species: F. striatus

Binomial name
- Figaro striatus Gledhill, Last & W. T. White, 2008
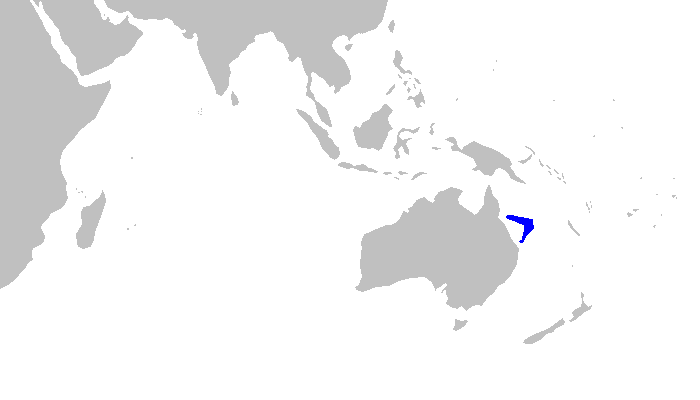
- Range of the northern sawtail catshark

Species of shark

The northern sawtail catshark (Figaro striatus) is a little-known species of deepwater catshark, belonong to the family Pentanchidae, endemic to northeastern Australia. It is demersal in nature and inhabits the upper continental slope at a depth of 300–420 m (980–1,380 ft). A small, slender species growing no longer than 42 cm (17 in), the northern sawtail catshark is characterized by a series of dark, narrow saddles along its back and tail, and rows of prominently enlarged dermal denticles along the upper edge of its caudal fin and the underside of its caudal peduncle. The International Union for Conservation of Nature (IUCN) does not yet have enough information to assess its conservation status.

== Taxonomy ==
The first known specimens of the northern sawtail catshark were collected during exploratory surveys conducted off northeastern Australia in the 1980s, and provisionally termed Galeus sp. B. It was formally described by Daniel Gledhill, Peter Last, and William White in a 2008 Commonwealth Scientific and Industrial Research Organisation (CSIRO) publication, in which they also resurrected the genus Figaro, until then considered a junior synonym of Galeus. The specific epithet striatus means "striped" in Latin. The type specimen is a 42 cm (17 in) long adult male caught south of the Saumarez Reefs, Queensland, on November 17, 1985.

== Distribution and habitat ==
The range of the northern sawtail catshark is limited to the upper continental slope off Queensland, between Rockhampton and Townsville. It is found on or near the bottom at a depth of 300–420 m (980–1,380 ft).

== Description ==
Reaching 42 cm (17 in) in length, the northern sawtail catshark has a firm, thin body with a mostly cylindrical cross-section. The head is short, narrow, and flattened, with a bluntly pointed snout. The eyes are horizontally oval and equipped with rudimentary nictitating membranes (protective third eyelids); beneath each is a narrow ridge, and behind is a tiny spiracle. The anterior rims of the nostrils are enlarged into triangular, outward-pointing flaps. The mouth is large and arched, with short but prominent furrows around each corner. There are around 65 upper and 61–65 lower tooth rows; each tooth has a narrow central cusp flanked by 3–5 smaller cusplets. There are five pairs of gill slits; the fourth and fifth are located over the pectoral fin bases and closer together than the others.

The small dorsal fins have blunt apexes and straight to gently convex trailing margins; the first is slightly taller but shorter-based than the second. The origin of the first and second dorsal fins lie over the rear of the pelvic fins and anal fin respectively. The pectoral fins are small and broad, with rounded corners. The pelvic fins are long and low; adult males have slender claspers and a slight "apron" formed from the fusion of the pelvic fin inner margins. The anal fin is elongated, its base measuring roughly a tenth of the total length, and rather angular. The length of the anal fin base exceeds the distance between the anal and pelvic fins, and is comparable to the distance between the dorsal fins. The caudal fin is short and low, with a small lower lobe and a ventral notch near the tip of the upper lobe. The body and fins are entirely covered by minute, overlapping dermal denticles; each has an ovoid crown with a horizontal ridge leading to a marginal cusp. There are distinctive crests of enlarged, spiny denticles along the anterior half of the caudal fin upper margin, and beneath the caudal peduncle. This species is light grayish brown on the back of the body and tail, with a series of dark brown saddles numbering 10–16 before the dorsal fins, of which a few are wider than the others. The flanks, underside, and fins are whitish.

== Biology and ecology ==
Little is known of the natural history of the northern sawtail catshark. Males attain sexual maturity at approximately 38 cm (15 in) long.

== Human interactions ==
The International Union for Conservation of Nature has noted that there is minimal fishing activity within the northern sawtail catshark's range, but presently lacks sufficient information to assess it beyond Data Deficient.
