= Roughback bristle shark =

Conservation status
- Data Deficient (IUCN 3.1)

Scientific classification
- Kingdom: Animalia
- Phylum: Chordata
- Class: Chondrichthyes
- Subclass: Elasmobranchii
- Division: Selachii
- Order: Carcharhiniformes
- Family: Dichichthyidae
- Genus: Dichichthys
- Species: D. satoi

Binomial name
- Dichichthys satoi White, Stewart, O'Neill & Naylor, 2024 , 2024

Species of ground shark

The roughback bristle shark (Dichichthys satoi) is a species of bristle shark of the newly discovered Dichichthyidae family, and was discovered in 2024. The species can reach a length of 1.05 m (3 ft 5 in). The roughback bristle shark lives off the waters of New Zealand, at a depth of between 2,200 and 3,900 ft (670 and 1,190 m).
