= White-tip catshark =

Conservation status
- Least Concern (IUCN 3.1)

Scientific classification
- Kingdom: Animalia
- Phylum: Chordata
- Class: Chondrichthyes
- Subclass: Elasmobranchii
- Division: Selachii
- Order: Carcharhiniformes
- Family: Dichichthyidae
- Genus: Dichichthys
- Species: D. albimarginatus

Binomial name
- Dichichthys albimarginatus Séret & Last, 2007

Synonyms
- Parmaturus albimarginatus Séret & Last, 2007

Species of shark

The white-tip catshark or white-tip bristle shark (Dichichthys albimarginatus) is a recently described, deepwater bristle shark, known only from a single specimen collected from northern New Caledonia, at a depth of 590–732 m. The only known specimen, an adult male, measured a total of 57.7 cm in length. These sharks have spiracles, which are respiratory openings behind the eyes. They are also recognized by two little dorsal fins. Numerous individuals from this group of sharks are likewise called dogfish.
