= Indonesian filetail catshark =

Conservation status
- Data Deficient (IUCN 3.1)

Scientific classification
- Kingdom: Animalia
- Phylum: Chordata
- Class: Chondrichthyes
- Subclass: Elasmobranchii
- Division: Selachii
- Order: Carcharhiniformes
- Family: Dichichthyidae
- Genus: Dichichthys
- Species: D. nigripalatum

Binomial name
- Dichichthys nigripalatum (Fahmi & Ebert, 2018)

Synonyms
- Parmaturus nigripalatum Fahmi & Ebert, 2018

Species of fish

The Indonesian filetail catshark (Dichichthys nigripalatum) is a species of shark belonging to the genus Dichichthys, the bristle sharks. This shark was first described as Parmaturus nigripalatum in 2018 by Fahmi and Ebert with its type locality given as south of Sumbawa at 9.04°S, 117.92°E from a depth of 170–190 m (560–620 ft). It is known from three specimens collected in the South China Sea.
