= Campeche catshark =

Conservation status
- Least Concern (IUCN 3.1)

Scientific classification
- Kingdom: Animalia
- Phylum: Chordata
- Class: Chondrichthyes
- Subclass: Elasmobranchii
- Division: Selachii
- Order: Carcharhiniformes
- Family: Pentanchidae
- Genus: Parmaturus
- Species: P. campechiensis

Binomial name
- Parmaturus campechiensis S. Springer, 1979
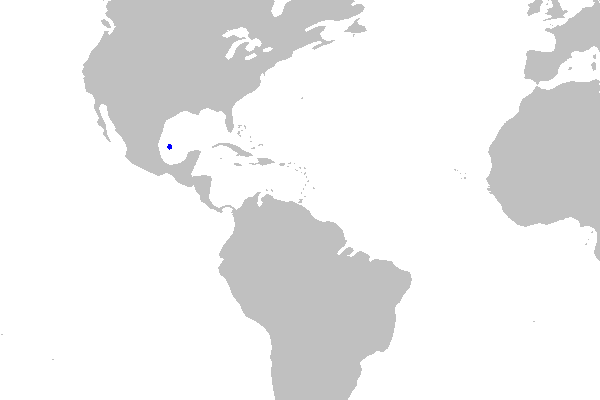

Species of shark

The Campeche catshark (Parmaturus campechiensis) is a species of shark belonging to the family Pentanchidae, the deepwater catsharks. It is known only from the holotype, a 15.7 cm immature female found in the northwestern Bay of Campeche in the Gulf of Mexico. The specimen was collected at 1,057 m, a depth beyond current and probably future fishing pressure in the region. The reproduction of this catshark is oviparous.
