= Røst Reef =

Undersea reef near Røst, Norway

Coordinates: 67.4165°N 9.9673°E

The Rost Reef (Norwegian: Røstrevet) is a deep-water coral reef off the coast of the Lofoten islands in Nordland county, Norway. The reef was discovered in 2002, about 100 kilometres (62 mi) west of the island of Røstlandet. It extends over a length of about 43 kilometers (27 mi), and has a width of up to 6.9 kilometers (4.3 mi). The reef is generated by the coral Lophelia pertusa, and is the world's largest known Lophelia reef. It is also the world's largest known deep-water coral reef. The authorities have introduced regulations to protect the reef against trawling. The temperature of the waters near the bottom of the Rost coral reef is 2 °C. WWF recognises the Røst Reef as a global natural heritage that merits protection through Marine Protected Area (MPA) status.

== Flora and fauna ==
The reef is generated by the coral Lophelia pertusa, and it hosts a profuse marine population that ranges from plankton to fish. Lophelia is associated with anemones, jellyfish and other animals. Lophelia are filter feeders and get all their energy by collecting separate plankton from water that flows along deep water currents. The Lophelia coral provides a habitat for many kinds of invertebrates and fishes. Røst reef is a habitat for invertebrates like worms, starfish, and lobsters, as well as vertebrates like fishes, that depend on deep-sea corals. The corals offer food, places to hide from predators, nurseries, and a solid surface. Studies performed by the Institute of Marine Research at Storegga, Norway, have shown a significantly higher density of cusk (Brosme brosme) and redfish (Sebastes marinus) in Lophelia areas as compared to the surrounding seabed.

== Human impact ==
Only a very small portion of the Røst Reef has been inspected. The observations indicate that the reef is largely intact. A significant number of entangled lines and nets were observed on the reef during video inspection. According to information from the Norwegian Directorate of Fisheries, nets and lines are the most common fishing equipment used on and around the Røst Reef. Trawling activities take place both in the northern and southern parts of the coral area, and to a lesser extent east of the coral area.

A potential threat towards the Røst Reef that may occur in the future is oil and gas development in the vicinity of the reef. The Røst Reef lies within the so-called "Nordland VI" petroleum block, which is regarded as a promising field by oil and gas companies. No licences were granted in this block during the latest licensing round as the Norwegian Ministry of Oil and Energy felt a need for more information before allowing further petroleum activities in this area, including possible measures to protect coral reefs. In general, little is known about the impacts of oil and gas exploration on Lophelia colonies. Infrastructure development may lead to physical destruction of reefs and stress due to increased sedimentation. Discharges related to drilling and production (drilling muds and produced water) contain substances known to affect other marine organisms negatively. Until the long-term impacts of these discharges on Lophelia have been determined, no such discharges will be allowed near the Røst Reef.

== Protection of the reef ==
To protect the Røst Reef from damaging fishery activities, a proposal to amend the 1999 Coral Regulation is being considered by the Norwegian Ministry of Fisheries. With this amendment, the Røst Reef and a 5 km zone on all sides will be protected from all fishing using equipment that may touch the bottom. While this is certainly a wise and valuable step towards the protection of this unique natural feature, according to the information from the Norwegian Directorate of Fisheries the reef is still unprotected from the potential impacts of petroleum activities. WWF proposes the establishment of a zone in which petroleum activities in the Røst area will be prohibited. This zone should encompass the reef, the seabird colonies at Røstlandet and their feeding ground as well as the important fish spawning grounds between Røst Island and the reef. The Norwegian Nature Conservation Act does not apply beyond territorial waters. It is not possible, therefore, to protect the Røst Reef as a nature reserve.

== See also ==
- Sula Reef
