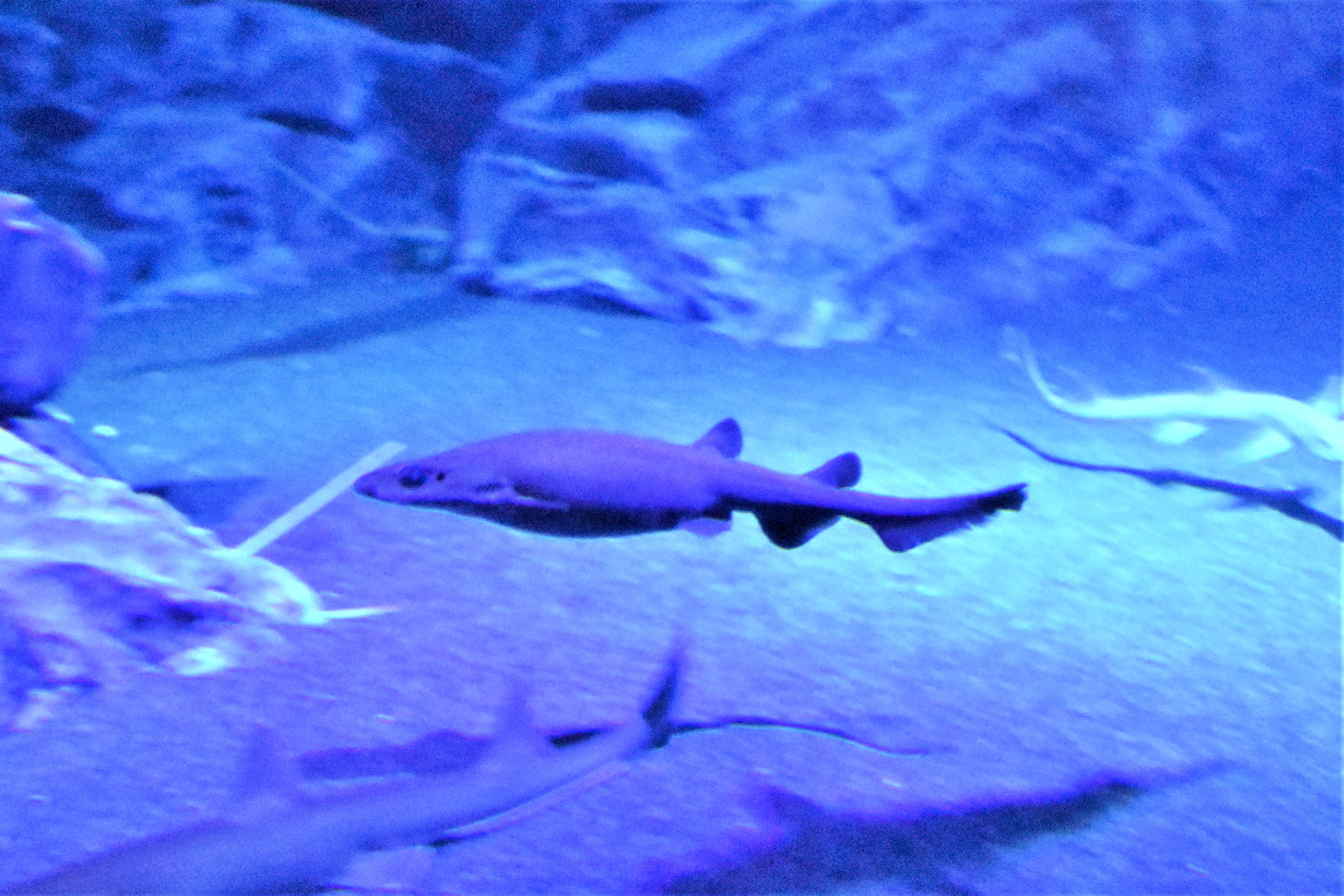
- Salamander shark at the Okinawa Churaumi Aquarium in Japan

Conservation status
- Least Concern (IUCN 3.1)

Scientific classification
- Kingdom: Animalia
- Phylum: Chordata
- Class: Chondrichthyes
- Subclass: Elasmobranchii
- Division: Selachii
- Order: Carcharhiniformes
- Family: Pentanchidae
- Genus: Parmaturus
- Species: P. pilosus

Binomial name
- Parmaturus pilosus Garman, 1906
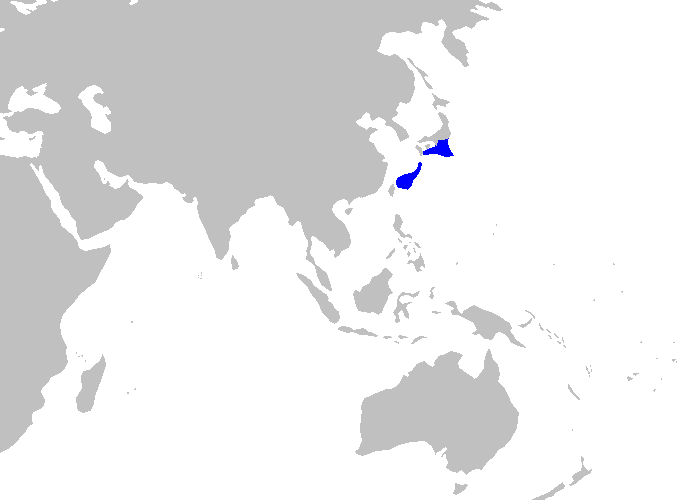

= Salamander shark =

Species of shark

The salamander shark or salamander catshark (Parmaturus pilosus) is a species of shark belonging to the family Pentanchidae, the deepwater catsharks. This species inhabits a range from Japan and the East China Sea, on the upper to middle continental slope at depths of 358–895 m. Specimens of this species can attain a total length of at least 64 cm. This catshark is a potential bycatch of trawl fisheries operating within its range, but no details are available. There are high levels of squalene in this catshark's liver. The reproduction of this catshark is oviparous.
