= White-clasper catshark =

Conservation status
- Least Concern (IUCN 3.1)

Scientific classification
- Kingdom: Animalia
- Phylum: Chordata
- Class: Chondrichthyes
- Subclass: Elasmobranchii
- Division: Selachii
- Order: Carcharhiniformes
- Family: Pentanchidae
- Genus: Parmaturus
- Species: P. albipenis

Binomial name
- Parmaturus albipenis Séret & Last, 2007

Species of shark

The white-clasper catshark (Parmaturus albipenis) is a species of shark belonging to the family Pentanchidae, the deepwater catsharks, known only from a single specimen collected from northern New Caledonia at a depth of 688–732 m. The only known specimen, an adult male, measured a total of 41.5 cm (16.3 in) in length.
