= Beige catshark =

- Preserved holotype of a female Dichichthys bigus

Conservation status
- Data Deficient (IUCN 3.1)

Scientific classification
- Kingdom: Animalia
- Phylum: Chordata
- Class: Chondrichthyes
- Subclass: Elasmobranchii
- Division: Selachii
- Order: Carcharhiniformes
- Family: Dichichthyidae
- Genus: Dichichthys
- Species: D. bigus

Binomial name
- Dichichthys bigus (Séret & Last, 2007)

Synonyms
- Parmaturus bigus Séret & Last, 2007

Species of shark

The beige catshark (Dichichthys bigus), or beige bristle shark, is a bristle shark of the family Dichichthyidae, The first recorded specimen was a female recorded off the coast of Queensland, Australia around Lord Howe Island. Its length was 72 cm.

Recently, a number of both male and female specimens (unpublished data) were captured in the waters off New Zealand, at the edge of the EEZ (exclusive economic zone). In 2024, the first footage of this shark was captured by the ROV SuBastian during Coral Sea surveys at Southern Small Detached Reef, Queensland. To date, very little is known about the ecology of this species. Scientists are currently studying the sensory systems of this catshark in order to reveal information about its ecology and ultimately behaviour. The reproduction of the beige catshark is oviparous.
