= Brazilian filetail catshark =

Conservation status
- Vulnerable (IUCN 3.1)

Scientific classification
- Kingdom: Animalia
- Phylum: Chordata
- Class: Chondrichthyes
- Subclass: Elasmobranchii
- Division: Selachii
- Order: Carcharhiniformes
- Family: Pentanchidae
- Genus: Parmaturus
- Species: P. angelae

Binomial name
- Parmaturus angelae Soares, de Carvalho, Schwingel & Gadig, 2019
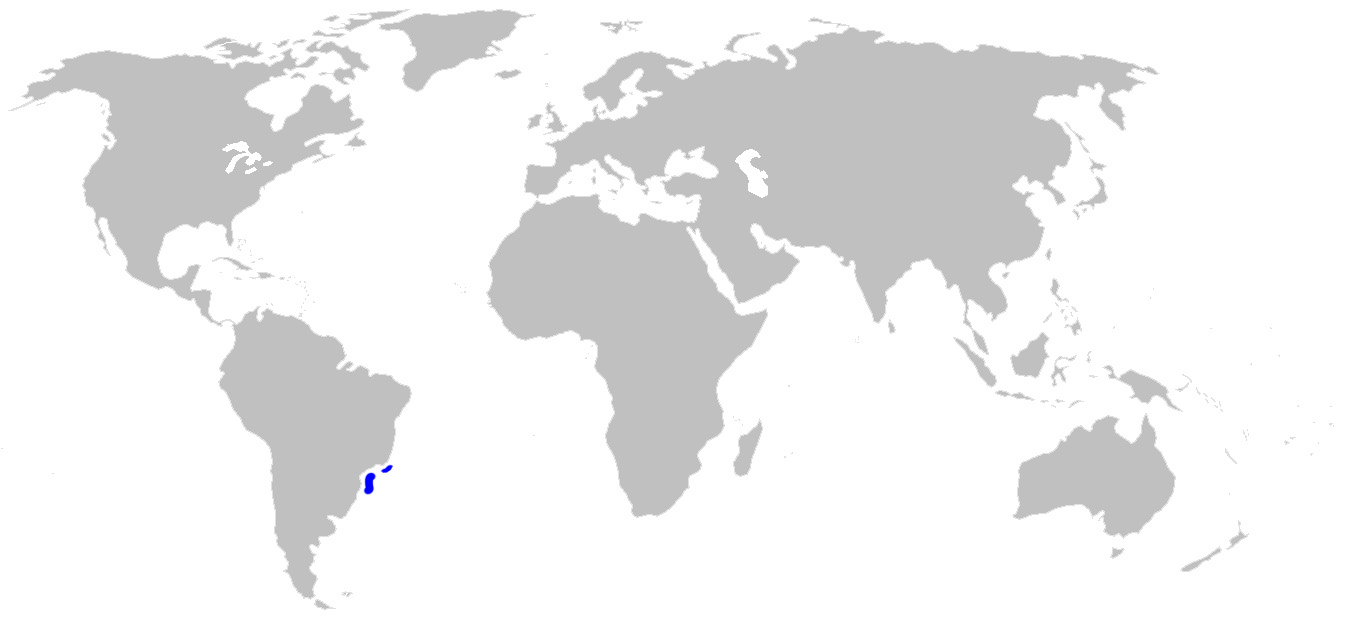
- Range of Brazilian filetail catshark

Species of catshark

The Brazilian filetail catshark (Parmaturus angelae) is a species of shark belonging to the family Pentanchidae, the deepwater catsharks, found in southern Brazil. It lives on the continental slopes at the depths of 500–600 m (1,600–2,000 ft).

This catshark has numerous characteristics which differ from all congeners in Western Atlantic Ocean, such as proportional dimensions, vertebral counts, dorsal fins subequal, and the presence of well-developed lower and upper caudal crests of denticles. Little is known about the biology of this species, aside from its oviparous reproduction system.
