= Blackgill catshark =

Conservation status
- Least Concern (IUCN 3.1)

Scientific classification
- Kingdom: Animalia
- Phylum: Chordata
- Class: Chondrichthyes
- Subclass: Elasmobranchii
- Division: Selachii
- Order: Carcharhiniformes
- Family: Dichichthyidae
- Genus: Dichichthys
- Species: D. melanobranchus

Binomial name
- Dichichthys melanobranchus W. L. Y. Chan, 1966
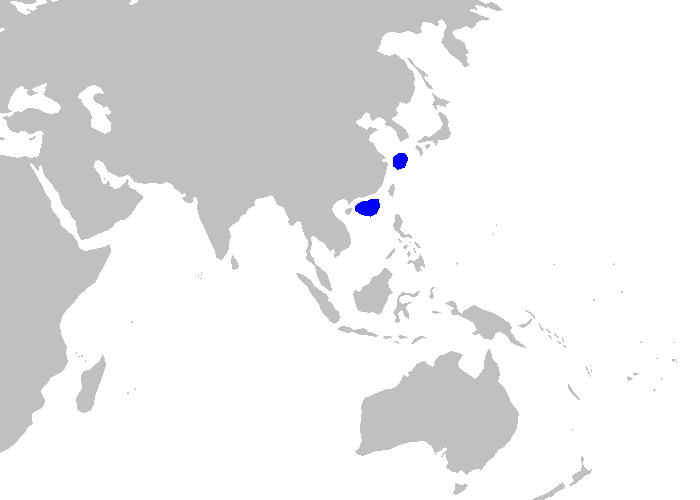

Synonyms
- Figaro melanobranchus (W. L. Y. Chan, 1966); Parmaturus melanobranchius (W. L. Y. Chan, 1966); Parmaturus melanobranchus (W. L. Y. Chan, 1966); Figaro piceus Chu, Meng & Liu, 1983; Galeus piceus (Chu, Meng & Liu, 1983)

Species of shark

The blackgill catshark or blackgill bristle shark (Dichichthys melanobranchus) is a deep water bristle shark known from very few specimens, found on or near the bottom on the continental slope, at 540–835 metres (1,772–2,740 ft) off the coasts of China and Japan. Specimens can attain a total length of at least 85 cm (33 in), have elongated cat-like eyes, and have two small dorsal fins set far back. They're oviparous and lay one egg at a time. This shark is a potential bycatch of deep water bottom-trawl fisheries operating within its range, but no specific information is available. In the upper jaw, there are rods of blunt, flat teeth with 3 cusps, likely used for crushing, as well as row of sharper teeth with the mid, central cusp longer and to a point. The bottom teeth are sharp, pointed, jagged and have three cusps, with the middle cusp slightly longer than the surrounding two.

== Behavior ==
Blackgill catsharks tend to travel and sleep in groups at night and sleep in groups during the day, as they are nocturnal creatures. They typically eat crustaceans and other ocean-floor sea life.
