= Bottom trawling =

Fishing method by towing a net along the seafloor

Wild fish catch from bottom trawling (1950–2018)

Bottom trawling is trawling (towing a trawl, which is a fishing net) along the seafloor. It is a controversial fishing technique due to its environmental impact on the seabed, and large bycatch.

It is also referred to as "dragging". The scientific community divides bottom trawling into benthic trawling and demersal trawling. Benthic trawling is towing a net at the very bottom of the ocean and demersal trawling is towing a net just above the benthic zone. Bottom trawling can be contrasted with midwater trawling (also known as pelagic trawling), where a net is towed higher in the water column. Midwater trawling catches pelagic fish such as anchovies and mackerel, whereas bottom trawling targets both bottom-living fish (groundfish) and semi-pelagic species such as cod, squid, shrimp, and rockfish.

Trawling is done by a trawler, which can be a small open boat with only 30 hp (22 kW) or a large factory trawler with 10,000 hp (7,500 kW). Bottom trawling can be carried out by one trawler or by two trawlers fishing cooperatively (pair trawling).

Global catch from bottom trawling has been estimated at over 30 million tonnes per year, an amount larger than any other fishing method. Concerns about the environmental impacts of bottom trawling have led to changes in gear design, such as the addition of turtle excluder devices to reduce bycatch, and limitations on locations where bottom trawling is allowed, such as marine protected areas. A 2021 paper estimated that bottom trawling contributed between 600 and 1500 million tons of carbon dioxide a year by disturbing carbon dioxide in the sea floor – emissions approximately equivalent to those of Germany, or the aviation industry. However, these values are highly uncertain and have been criticized as overestimates. International attempts to limit bottom trawling have been ineffective.

== History ==
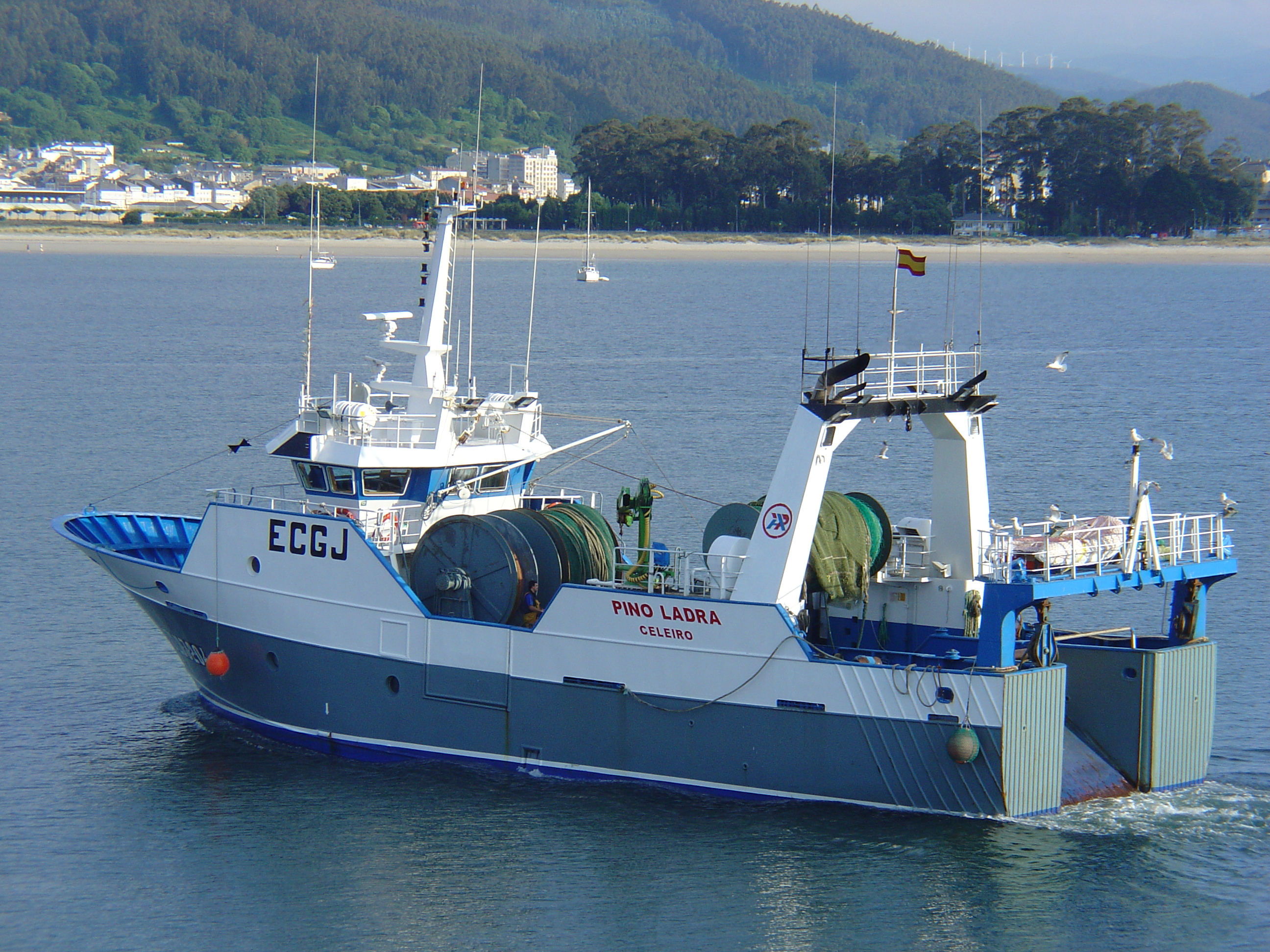
Viveiro

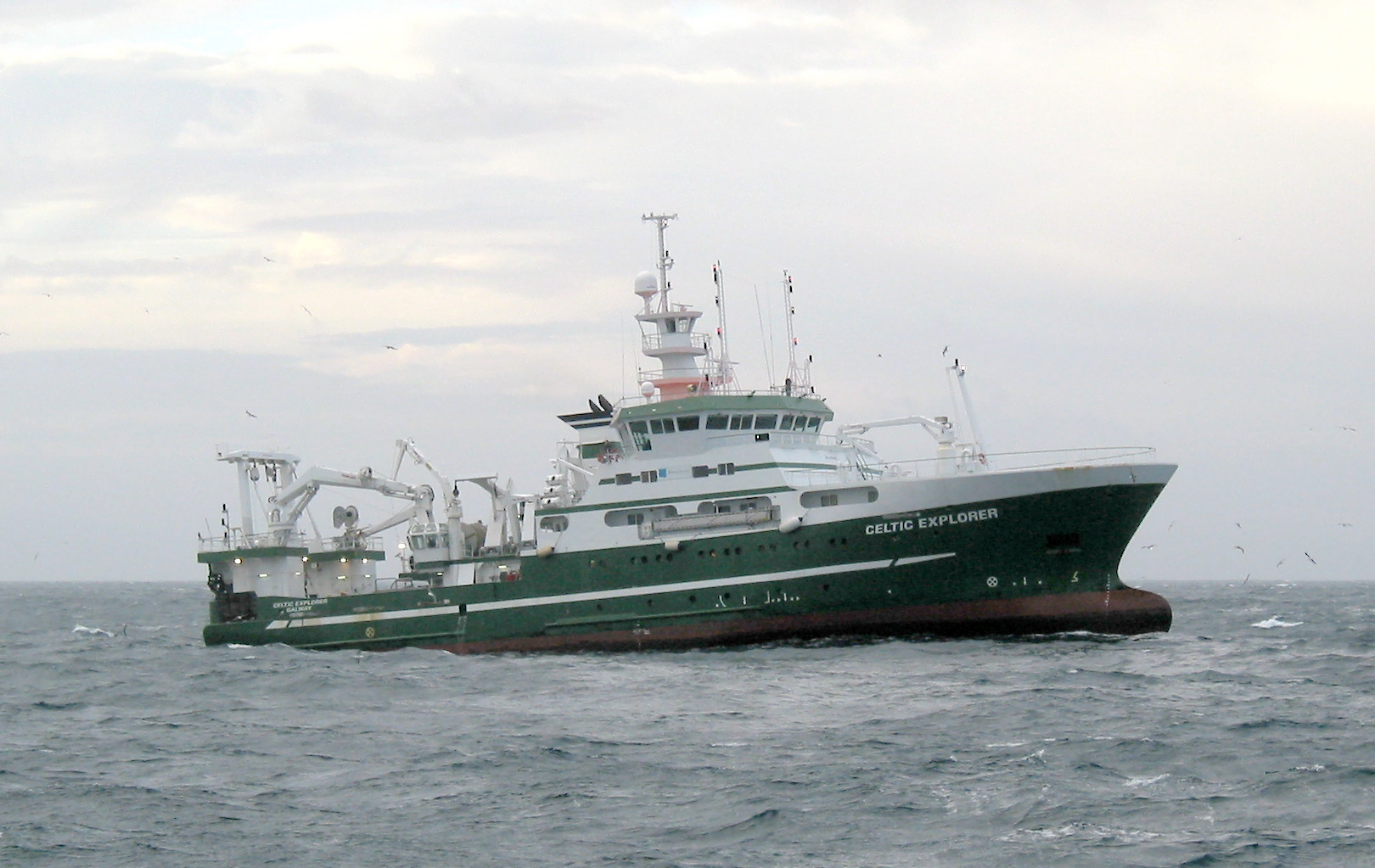
The Celtic Explorer, a research vessel engaged in bottom trawling

An early reference to fishery conservation measures comes from a complaint about a form of trawling dating from the 14th century, during the reign of Edward III. A petition was presented to Parliament in 1376 calling for the prohibition of a "subtlety contrived instrument called the wondyrchoum". This was an early beam trawl with a wooden beam, and consisted of a net 6 m (18 ft) long and 3 m (10 ft) wide,

of so small a mesh, no manner of fish, however small, entering within it can pass out and is compelled to remain therein and be taken...by means of which instrument the fishermen aforesaid take so great abundance of small fish aforesaid, that they know not what to do with them, but feed and fatten the pigs with them, to the great damage of the whole commons of the kingdom, and the destruction of the fisheries in like places, for which they pray remedy.

Another source describes the wondyrchoum as:

three fathom long and ten men's feet wide, and that it had a beam ten feet long, at the end of which were two frames formed like a colerake, that a leaded rope weighted with a great many stones was fixed on the lower part of the net between the two frames, and that another rope was fixed with nails on the upper part of the beam, so that the fish entering the space between the beam and the lower net were caught. The net had maskes of the length and breadth of two men's thumbs

The response from the Crown was to "let Commission be made by qualified persons to inquire and certify on the truth of this allegation, and thereon let right be done in the Court of Chancery". Thus, already back in the Middle Ages, basic arguments about three of the most sensitive current issues surrounding trawling – the effect of trawling on the wider environment, the use of small mesh size, and of industrial fishing for animal feed – were already being raised.

Until the late 18th century sailing vessels were only capable of towing small trawls. However, in the closing years of that century a type of vessel emerged that was capable of towing a large trawl, in deeper waters. The development of this type of craft, the sailing trawler, is credited to the fishermen of Brixham in Devon. The new method proved to be far more efficient than traditional long-lining. At first its use was confined to the western half of the English Channel, but as the Brixham men extended their range to the North Sea and Irish Sea it became the norm there too.

By the end of the 19th century there were more than 3,000 sailing trawlers in commission in UK waters and the practice had spread to neighbouring European countries. Despite the availability of steam, trawling under sail continued to be economically efficient, and sailing trawlers continued to be built until the middle of the 1920s. Some were still operating in UK waters until the outbreak of World War II, and in Scandinavia and the Faroe Islands until the 1950s.

English commissions in the 19th century determined that there should be no limitation on trawling. They believed that bottom trawling, like tilling of land, actually increased production. As evidence, they noted that a second trawler would often follow a first trawler, and that the second trawler would often harvest even more fish than the first. The reason for this peculiarity is that the destruction caused by the first trawl resulted in many dead and dying organisms, which temporarily attracted a large number of additional species to feed on this moribund mass.

Bottom trawling does not only have a long tradition in European waters. It was also recognized in 1704 during the Edo era in Japan as a common fishing method. A slightly different approach was developed where the "Utase Ami" or "trawled bottom net" was deployed from a sideways sailing boat. Bottom trawling has been widely implicated in the population collapse of a variety of fish species, locally and worldwide, including orange roughy, barndoor skate, shark, and many others.

== Fishing gear ==
The design requirements of a bottom trawl are relatively simple, a mechanism for keeping the mouth of the net open in horizontal and vertical dimensions, a "body" of net which guides fish inwards, and a "cod-end" of a suitable mesh size, where the fish are collected. The size and design of net used is determined by the species being targeted, the engine power and design of the fishing vessel and locally enforced regulations.

=== Beam trawling ===
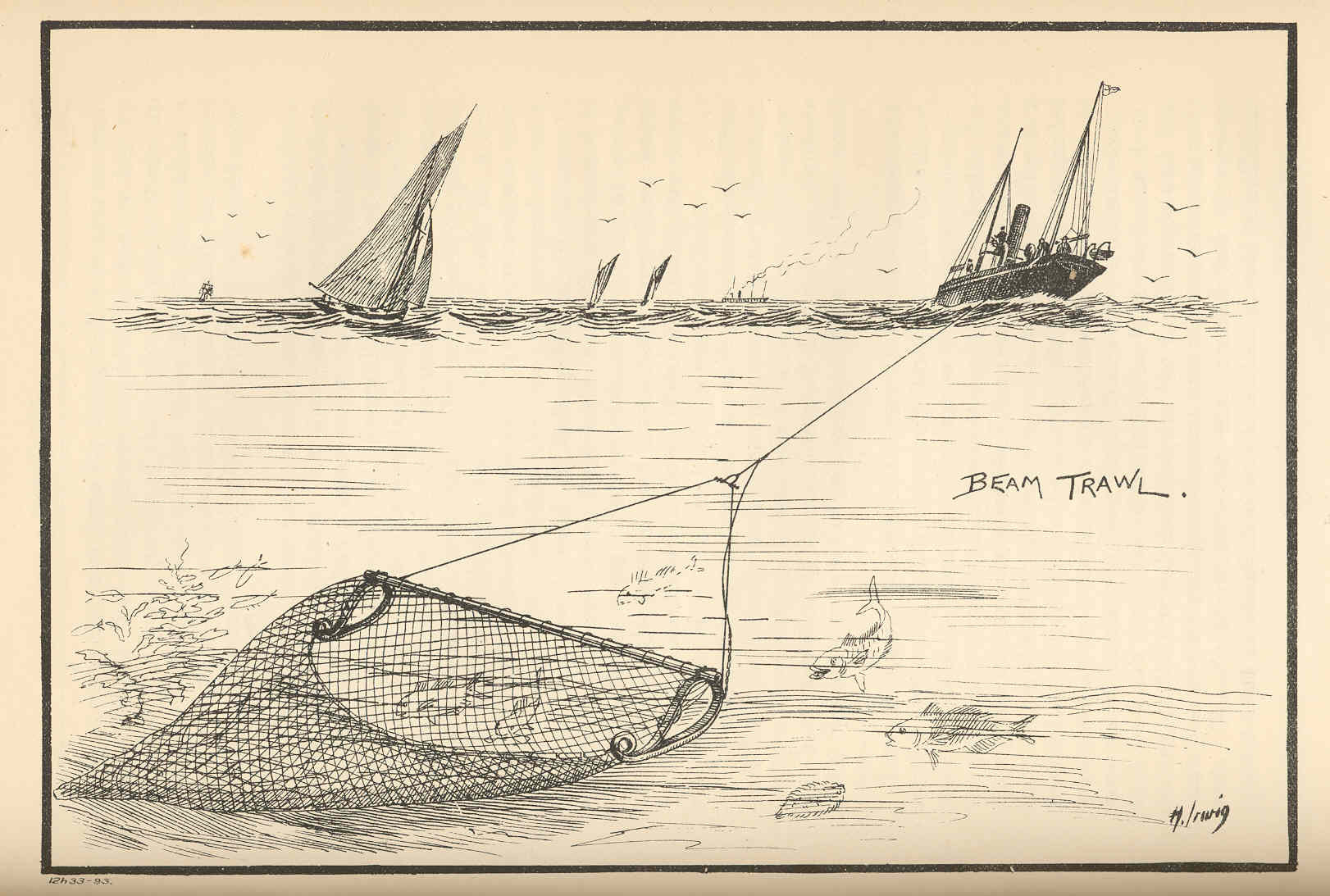
Drawing of a beam trawl

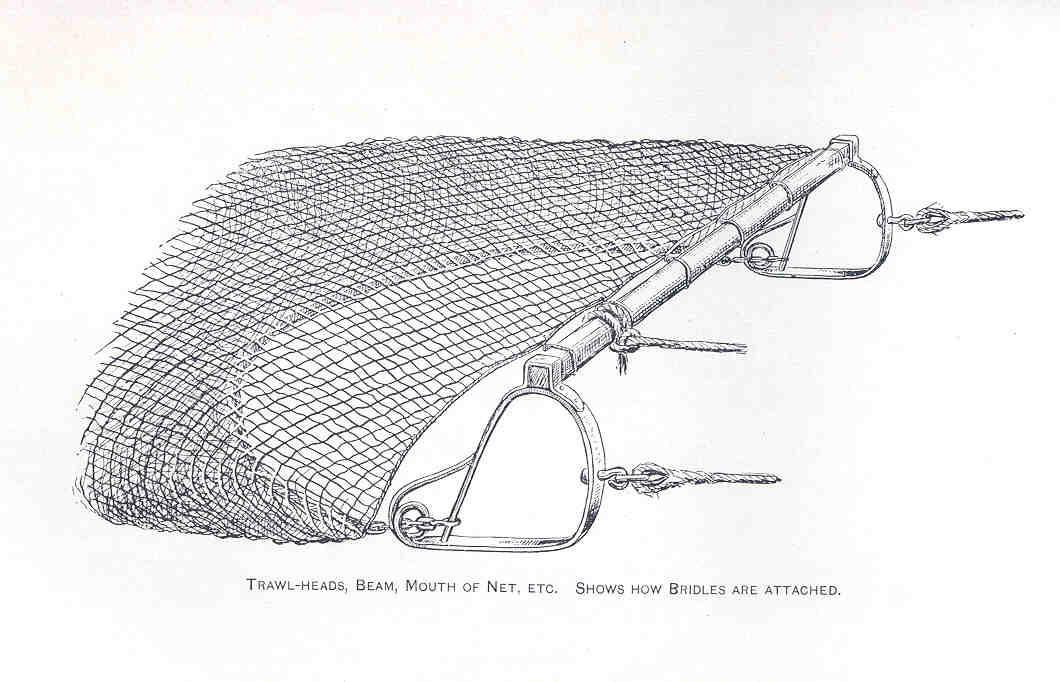
Drawing of a trawl net

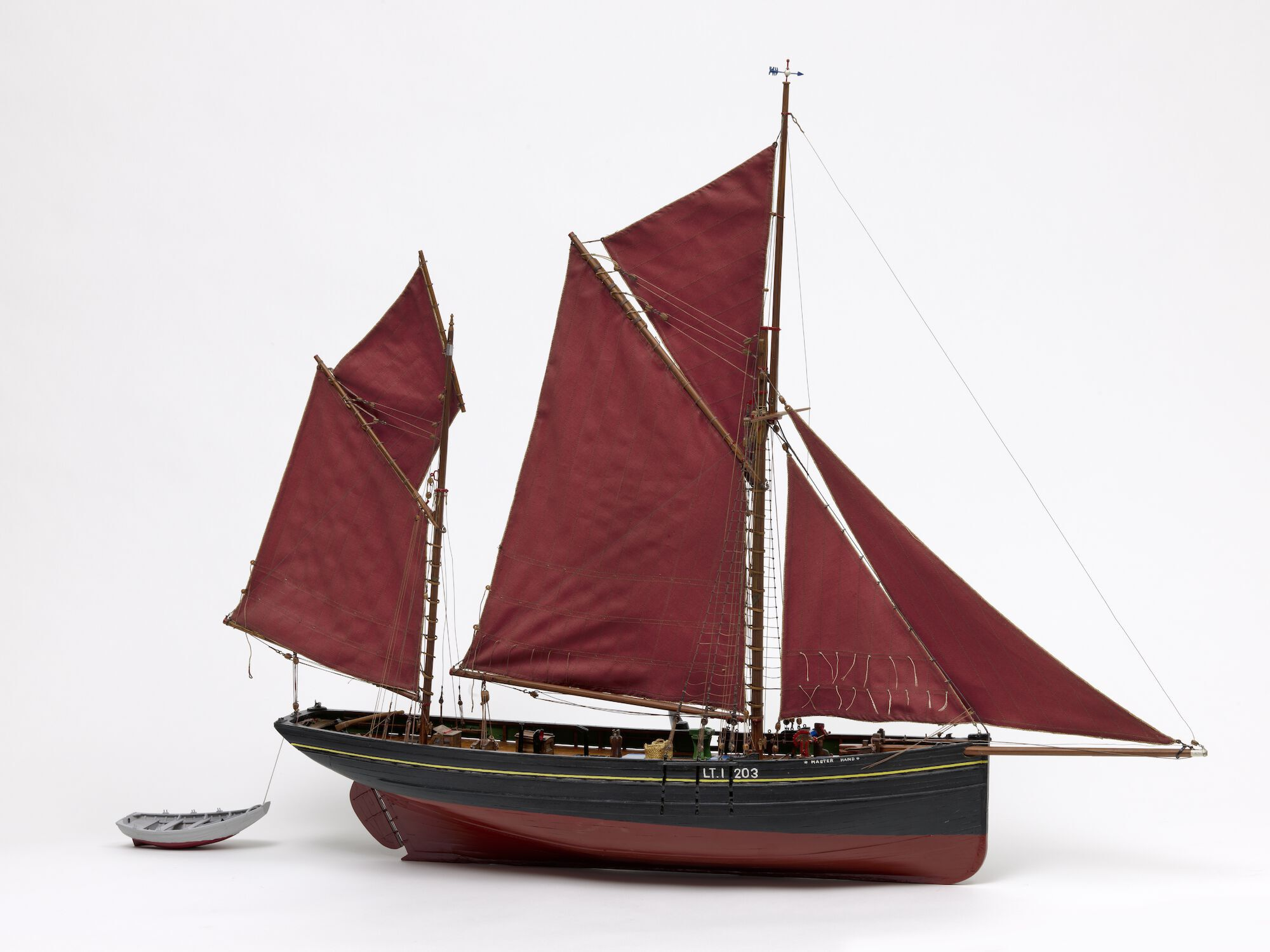
Ship model of the smack for beam trawling

The simplest method of bottom trawling, the mouth of the net is held open by a solid metal beam, attached to two "shoes", which are solid metal plates, welded to the ends of the beam, which slide over and disturb the seabed. This method is mainly used on smaller vessels, fishing for flatfish or prawns, relatively close inshore.

=== Otter trawling ===
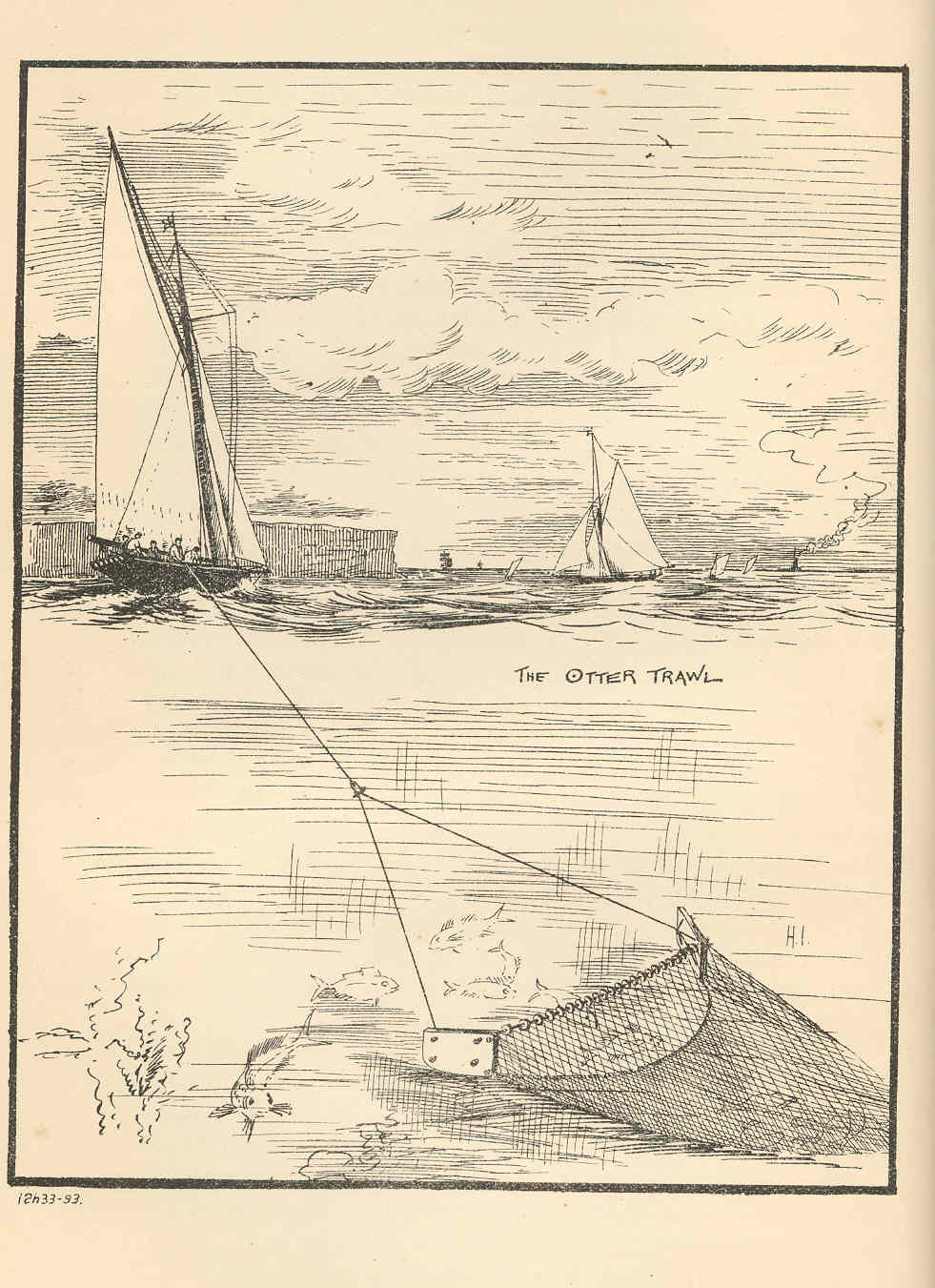
Otter trawl

Otter trawling derives its name from the large rectangular otter boards which are used to keep the mouth of the trawl net open. Otter boards are made of timber or steel and are positioned in such a way that the hydrodynamic forces, acting on them when the net is towed along the seabed, push them outwards and prevent the mouth of the net from closing. They also act like a plough, digging up to 15 centimetres (6 in) into the seabed, creating a turbid cloud, and scaring fish towards the net mouth.

The net is held open vertically on an otter trawl by floats and/or kites attached to the "headline" (the rope which runs along the upper mouth of the net), and weighted "bobbins" attached to the "foot rope" (the rope which runs along the lower mouth of the net). These bobbins vary in their design, depending on the roughness of the sea bed that is being fished, varying from small rubber discs for very smooth, sandy ground, to large metal balls, up to 0.5 metres (1.6 ft) in diameter, for very rough ground. These bobbins can also be designed to lift the net off the seabed when they hit an obstacle. These are known as "rock-hopper" gear.

=== Body of the trawl ===
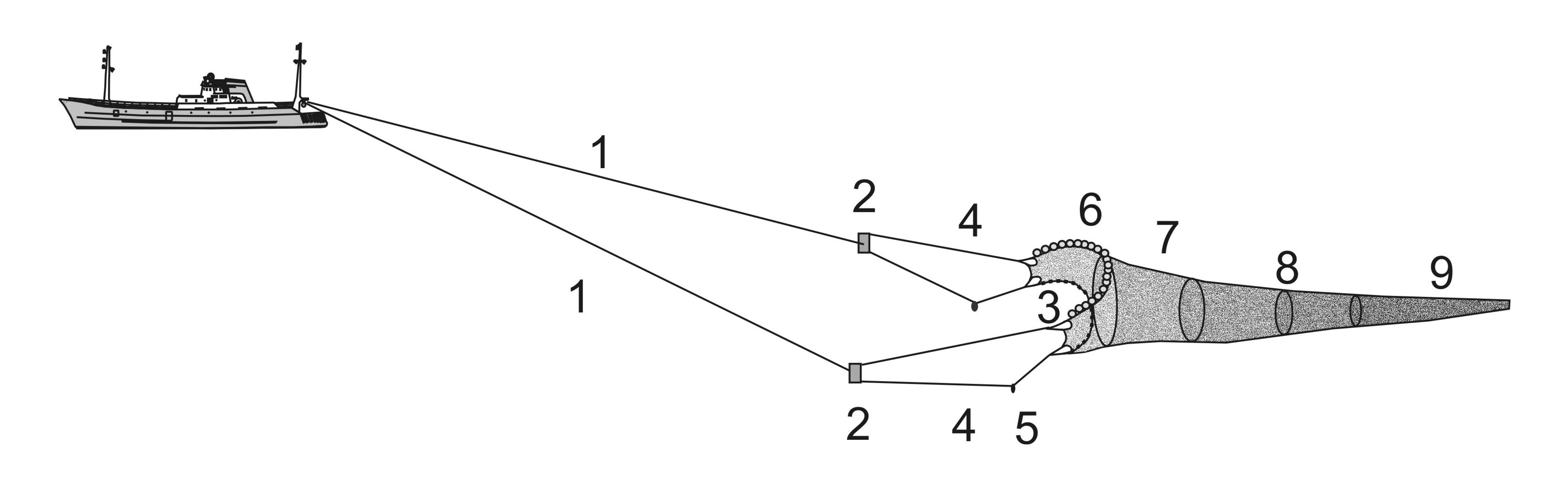
Pelagic (midwater) otter trawl. 1: trawl warp, 2: otter boards, 3: longline chains, 4 hunter, 5: weights 6: headline with floats, 7: pre-net, 8: tunnel and belly, 9: codend

The body of the trawl is funnel-like, wide at its "mouth" and narrowing towards the cod end, and usually is fitted with wings of netting on both sides of the mouth. It is long enough to assure adequate flow of water and prevent fish from escaping the net, after having been caught. It is made of diamond-meshed netting, the size of the meshes decreasing from the front of the net towards the codend. Into the body, fish and turtle escape devices can be fitted. These can be simple structures like "square mesh panels", which are easier for smaller fish to pass through, or more complicated devices, such as bycatch grills.

=== Cod end ===
The cod end is the trailing end of the net where fish are finally "caught". The size of mesh in the cod end is a determinant of the size of fish which the net catches. Consequently, regulation of mesh size is a common way of managing mortality of juvenile fishes in trawl nets.

== Environmental damage ==
Short clip of a bottom trawl of Lake Michigan and the large amounts of debris produced

Trawling gear produces acute impacts on biota and the physical substratum of the seafloor by disrupting the sediment column structure, overturning boulders, re-suspending sediments and imprinting deep scars on muddy bottoms. Also, the repetitive passage of trawling gear over the same areas creates long-lasting, cumulative impacts that modify the cohesiveness and texture of sediments. It can be asserted nowadays that due to its recurrence, mobility and wide geographical extent, industrial trawling has become a major force driving seafloor change and affecting not only its physical integrity on short spatial scales but also imprinting measurable modifications to the geomorphology of entire continental margins.

Bottom fishing has operated for over a century on heavily fished grounds such as the North Sea and Grand Banks. While overfishing has long been recognised as causing major ecological changes to the fish community on the Grand Banks, concern has been raised more recently about the damage which benthic trawling inflicts upon seabed communities. A species of particular concern is the slow growing, deep water coral Lophelia pertusa. This species is home to a diverse community of deep sea organisms, but is easily damaged by fishing gear. On 17 November 2004, the United Nations General Assembly urged nations to consider temporary bans on high seas bottom trawling. A global analysis of the impacts of bottom trawling found that the impact on seabed biota was strongly dependent on the type of gear used, with otter trawls estimated as having the smallest impact and removing 6% of biota per pass while hydraulic dredges had the largest impact and removed 41% of biota per pass. Other research found trawled canyon sediments contained 52 percent less organic matter than the undisturbed seafloor. There were 80 percent fewer sea worms in the trawled region and only half as much diversity of species in the trawled seafloor.

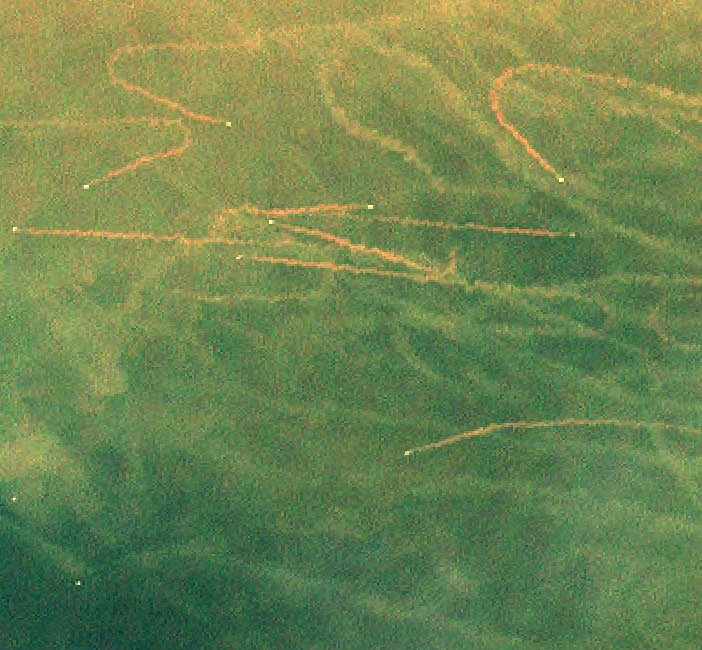
Satellite image of trawler mud trails off the Louisiana coast

Life-cycle assessment (LCA) can be used to estimate the potential biodiversity impacts of bottom trawling as part of the environmental impacts of seafood production. Life-cycle impact assessment methods account for seabed disturbance and ecological recovery, allowing potential impacts to be compared across fishing activities and regions. However, the availability of spatially detailed data on trawling intensity, ecosystem responses, and recovery times remains limited, introducing uncertainty into these assessments.

=== Resuspension and biogeochemistry ===
Bottom trawling stirs up the sediment at the bottom of the sea. The suspended solid plumes can drift with the current for tens of kilometres from the source of the trawling, increasing sedimentation rates in deep environments Bottom trawling-induced resuspended sediment mass on the world's continental shelves has been estimated at 22 gigatonnes per year, approximately the same as the sediment mass supplied to the continental shelves through the world's rivers. These plumes introduce a turbidity which decreases light levels at the bottom and can affect kelp reproduction. Repeated resuspension can also lead to a hardening of the sea bottom as finer sediments are proportionally more effectively carried away by currents than larger sediments, thus leading to habitat change.

Bottom trawling can both resuspend and bury biologically recyclable organic material, changing the flow of nutrients and carbon through the food web and thereby alter geomorphological landscapes. Ocean sediments are the sink for many persistent organic pollutants, usually lipophilic pollutants like DDT, PCB and PAH. Bottom trawling mixes these pollutants into the plankton ecology where they can move back up the food chain and into our food supply.

Phosphorus is often found in high concentration in soft shallow sediments. Resuspending nutrient solids like these can introduce oxygen demand into the water column, and result in oxygen deficient dead zones. Even in areas where the bottom sediments are ancient, bottom trawling, by reintroducing the sediment into the water column, can create harmful algae blooms. More suspended solids are introduced into the oceans from bottom trawling than any other man-made source.

Multiple large-scale reviews on bottom trawling have noted that there is a great need for further studies that properly examine the effects of nutrient and toxin remobilization as well as carbon cycling, in order to better estimate greenhouse gas emissions and hence the impact on climate change.

=== Deep sea damage ===
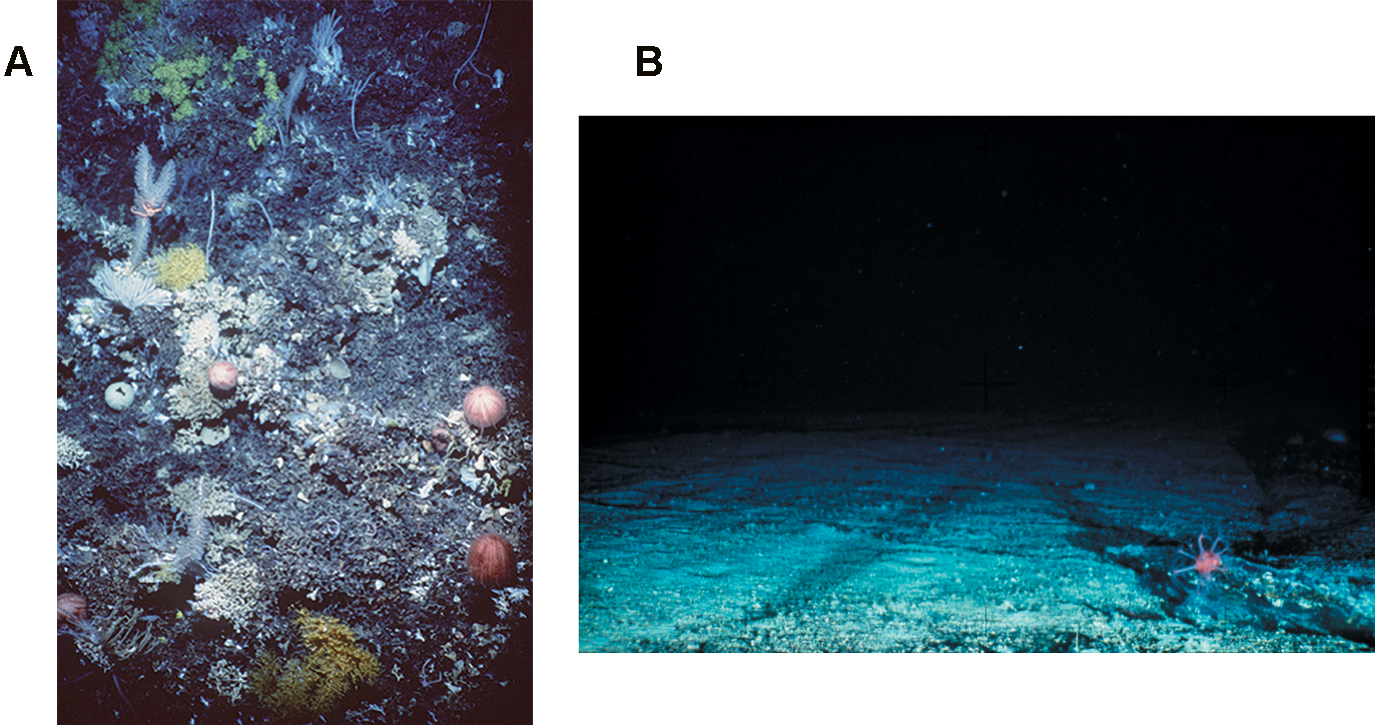
(A) The coral community and seabed on an untrawled seamount. (B) The exposed bedrock of a trawled seamount. Both are 1,000–2,000 metres (3,300–6,600 ft) below the surface.

The secretary general of the United Nations reported in 2006 that 95 percent of damage to seamount ecosystems worldwide is caused by deep sea bottom trawling. A study published in Current Biology suggests a cutoff of 600 metres (2,000 ft) is a point which ecological damage increases significantly. David Attenborough described the ocean floor damage as "unspeakably awful" stating that "If you did anything remotely like it on land, everybody would be up in arms".

=== Carbon release ===
An estimated 370 million tonnes a year of carbon dioxide stored in seafloor sediment is released by bottom-trawling fishing. Most carbon released into the sea enters the atmosphere within a decade. Banning bottom trawling in marine protected areas has been suggested.

=== Current restrictions ===
Today, some countries regulate bottom trawling within their jurisdictions:

- The United States Regional Fishery Management Councils limit bottom trawling in specific closed areas to protect specific species or habitat. For instance, on the United States West Coast a large Rockfish Conservation Area was created in 2002 prohibiting trawling in most areas of the coast between 75 and 150 fathoms – 450 to 900 feet (140 to 270 m) – to protect overfished rockfish species. In 2018, these closures were revised to allow trawling in some previously closed areas while closing new areas of sensitive habitat to bottom trawling.
- The Council of the European Union in 2004 applied "a precautionary approach" and closed the sensitive Darwin Mounds off Scotland to bottom trawling.
- In 2005, the United Nations Food and Agriculture Organization's General Fisheries Commission for the Mediterranean (GFCM) banned bottom trawling below 1000 meters (3,281 ft) and, in January 2006, completely closed ecologically sensitive areas off Italy, Cyprus, and Egypt to all bottom trawling.
- Norway first recognized in 1999 that trawling had caused significant damage to its cold-water lophelia corals. Norway has since established a program to determine the location of cold-water corals within its exclusive economic zone (EEZ) so as to quickly close those areas to bottom trawling.
- Canada has acted to protect vulnerable coral reef ecosystems from bottom trawling off Nova Scotia. The Northeast Channel was protected by a fisheries closure in 2002, and the Gully area was protected by its designation as a Marine Protected Area (MPA) in 2004.
- Australia in 1999 established the Tasmanian Seamounts Marine Reserve to prohibit bottom trawling in the south Tasman Sea. Australia also prohibits bottom trawling in the Great Australian Bight Marine Park off South Australia near Ceduna. In 2004, Australia established the world's largest marine protected area in the Great Barrier Reef Marine Park, where fishing and other extractive activities are prohibited.
- New Zealand in 2001 closed 19 seamounts within its EEZ to bottom trawling, including in the Chatham Rise, sub-Antarctic waters, and off the east and west coasts of the North Island. New Zealand Fisheries Minister Jim Anderton announced on 14 February 2006 that a draft agreement had been reached with fishing companies to ban bottom trawling in 30 percent of New Zealand's EEZ, an area of about 1,200,000 square kilometres (460,000 sq mi) reaching from subantarctic waters to subtropical ones. But only a small fraction of the area proposed for protection will cover areas actually vulnerable to bottom trawling.
- Palau has banned all bottom trawling within its jurisdiction and by any Palauan or Palauan corporation anywhere in the world.
- The President of Kiribati, Anote Tong, announced in early 2006 the formation of the world's first deep-sea marine reserve area. This measure – the Phoenix Islands Protected Area – created the world's third-largest marine protected area and may protect deep sea corals, fish, and seamounts from bottom trawling. However, the actual boundaries of this reserve and what harvest limitations may occur therein have not been detailed. Moreover, Kiribati currently has only one patrol boat to monitor this proposed region.
- Venezuela was the first country to ban industrial trawling in its territorial waters and EEZ in 2009.
- Hong Kong passed legislation banning trawling on 18 May 2011 in an effort to restore the territory's devastated fish stocks and marine ecosystem. The ban came into effect on 31 December 2012. The government paid HK$1.72 billion to affected trawlers in a buyout scheme. Persons who contravene the ban can be fined or imprisoned under the Fisheries Protection Ordinance (Cap 171).
- Sri Lanka banned trawling in 2017, however, Indian fishermen regularly engage in banned trawling in Sri Lankan waters.

=== Lack of regulation ===
Beyond national jurisdictions, most bottom trawling is unregulated either because there is no Regional Fisheries Management Organisation (RFMO) with competence to regulate, or else what RFMOs that do exist have not actually regulated. The major exception to this is in the Antarctic region, where the Convention for the Conservation of Antarctic Marine Living Resources regime has instituted extensive bottom trawling restrictions.

The North East Atlantic Fisheries Commission (NEAFC) also recently closed four seamounts and part of the mid-Atlantic Ridge from all fishing, including bottom trawling, for three years. This still leaves most of international waters completely without bottom trawl regulation.

As of May 2007 the area managed under the South Pacific Regional Fisheries Management Organisation (SPRFMO) has gained a new level of protection. All countries fishing in the region (accounting for about 25 percent of the global ocean) agreed to exclude bottom trawling on high seas areas where vulnerable ecosystems are likely or known to occur until a specific impact assessment is undertaken and precautionary measures have been implemented. Observers will also be required on all high seas bottom trawlers to ensure enforcement of the regulations.

=== Failed United Nations ban ===
Palau President Tommy Remengesau has called for a ban on destructive and unregulated bottom trawling beyond national jurisdictions. Palau has led the effort at the United Nations and in the Pacific to achieve a consensus by countries to take this action at an international level. Palau has been joined by the Federated States of Micronesia, the Republic of the Marshall Islands, and Tuvalu in supporting an interim bottom trawling ban at the United Nations. The proposal for this ban did not result in any actual legislation and was blocked.

In 2006, New Zealand fisheries minister Jim Anderton promised to support a global ban on bottom trawling if there was sufficient support to make that a practical option. Bottom trawling has been banned in a third of New Zealand's waters (although a large percentage of these areas were not viable for bottom trawling in the first place)

== See also ==
- Environmental impact of fishing
- Deep Sea Conservation Coalition – International alliance of groups to protect deep sea environment (DSCC)
- Demersal fish – Fish that live and feed on or near the bottom of seas or lakes
- Mincarlo – Preserved British fishing trawler, a historic sidewinder trawler
- Fishing dredge – Dredging equipment
