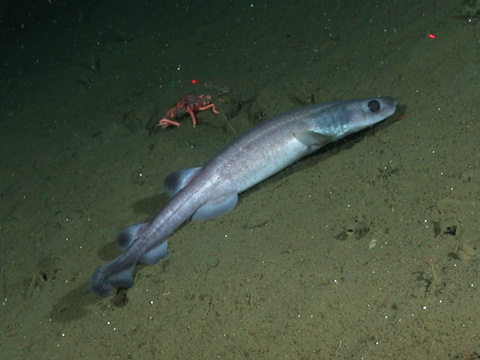
- Parmaturus xaniurus

Scientific classification
- Kingdom: Animalia
- Phylum: Chordata
- Class: Chondrichthyes
- Subclass: Elasmobranchii
- Division: Selachii
- Order: Carcharhiniformes
- Family: Pentanchidae
- Genus: Parmaturus; Garman, 1906

Type species
- Parmaturus pilosus Garman 1906

= Parmaturus =

Genus of sharks

Parmaturus is a genus of deepwater catsharks in the family Pentanchidae. Four species were described in 2007 and another in 2019 with more species likely to be described in the near future.

== Species ==
The following are the currently described species:

- Parmaturus albipenis Séret & Last, 2007 (white-clasper catshark)
- Parmaturus angelae K. D. A. Soares, M. R. de Carvalho, Schwingel & Gadig, 2019 (Brazilian filetail catshark)
- Parmaturus campechiensis S. Springer, 1979 (Campeche catshark)
- Parmaturus lanatus Séret & Last, 2007 (velvet catshark)
- Parmaturus macmillani Hardy, 1985 (McMillan's catshark)
- Parmaturus pilosus Garman, 1906 (salamander shark)
- Parmaturus xaniurus (C. H. Gilbert, 1892) (filetail catshark)

There are several as yet undescribed species:

- Parmaturus sp. not yet described (roughback catshark)
- Parmaturus sp. not yet described (Gulf of Mexico filetail)
