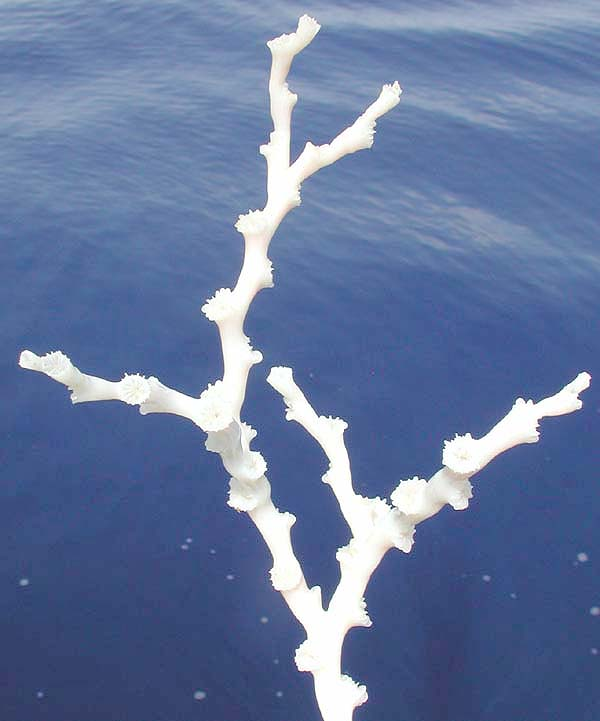

Conservation status
- Vulnerable (IUCN 3.1)
- CITES Appendix II

Scientific classification
- Kingdom: Animalia
- Phylum: Cnidaria
- Subphylum: Anthozoa
- Class: Hexacorallia
- Order: Scleractinia
- Family: Caryophylliidae
- Genus: Lophelia; Milne-Edwards & Haime, 1849
- Species: L. pertusa

Binomial name
- Lophelia pertusa (Linnaeus, 1758)
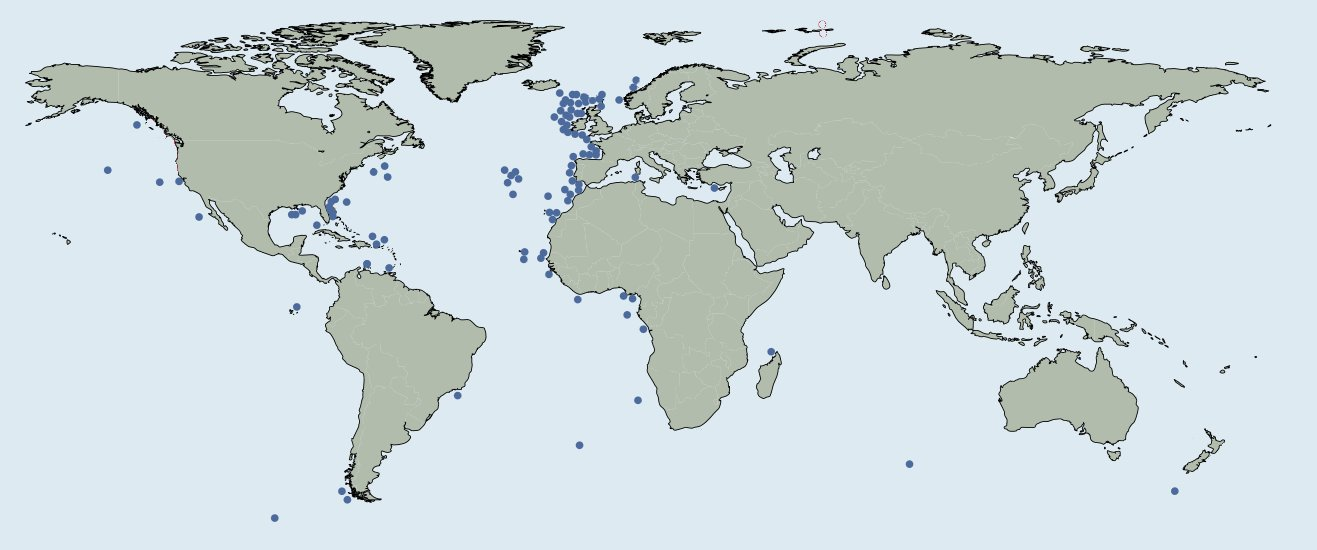
- Known range (NOAA)

Synonyms
- Desmophyllum pertusum (Linnaeus, 1758); Dendrosmilia nomlandi Durham & Barnard, 1952; Lophelia californica Durham, 1947; Lophelia prolifera (Pallas, 1766); Lophohelia affinis Pourtalès, 1868; Lophohelia prolifera; Lophohelia prolifera f. brachycephala Moseley, 1881; Lophohelia prolifera f. gracilis Duncan, 1873; Lophohelia subcostata Milne-Edwards & Haime, 1850; Lophohelia tubulosa Studer, 1878; Madrepora pertusa Linnaeus, 1758; Madrepora prolifera Pallas, 1766

= Lophelia =

Species of cnidarian

Lophelia pertusa, the only species in the genus Lophelia, is a cold-water coral that grows in the deep waters throughout the North Atlantic ocean, as well as parts of the Caribbean Sea and Alboran Sea. Although L. pertusa reefs are home to a diverse community, the species is extremely slow growing and may be harmed by destructive fishing practices, or oil exploration and extraction.

== Biology ==
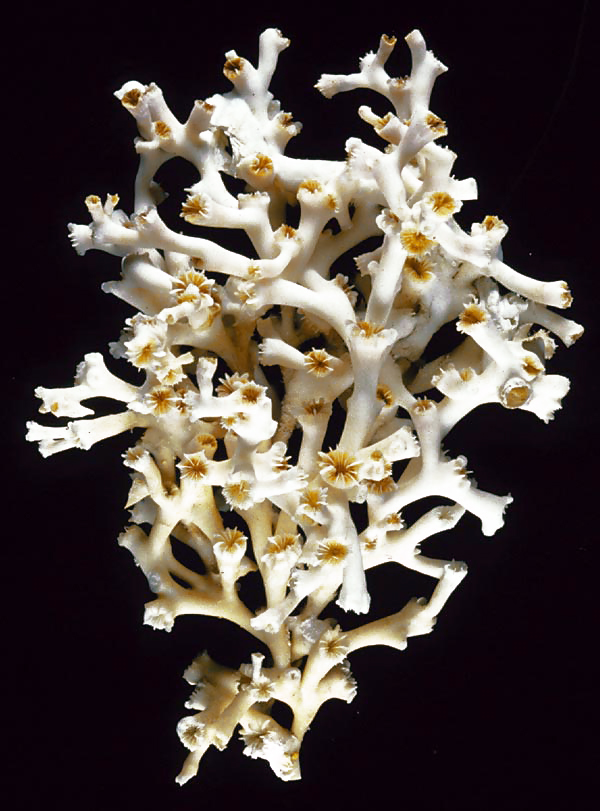
Lophelia pertusa

Lophelia pertusa is a reef building, deep water coral, but it does not contain zooxanthellae, the symbiotic algae which lives inside most tropical reef building corals. Lophelia lives at a temperature range from about 4–12 °C (39–54 °F) and at depths between 80 metres (260 ft) and over 3,000 metres (9,800 ft), but most commonly at depths of 200–1,000 metres (660–3,280 ft), where there is no sunlight.

As a coral, it represents a colonial organism, which consists of many individuals. New polyps live and build upon the calcium carbonate skeletal remains of previous generations. Living coral ranges in colour from white to orange-red; each polyp has up to 16 tentacles and is a translucent pink, yellow or white. Unlike most tropical corals, the polyps are not interconnected by living tissue. Some colonies have larger polyps while others have small and delicate-looking ones. Radiocarbon dating indicates that some Lophelia reefs in the waters off North Carolina may be 40,000 years old, with individual living coral bushes as much as 1,000 years old.

The colony grows by budding new polyps, with living ones emerging around the outer edges of deceased coral. Coral colonies reproduce asexually through fragmentation. This species is gonochoric, engaging in sexual reproduction by releasing sperm or oocytes into the sea. The larvae, which do not feed but rely on their yolk reserves, drift with plankton for weeks. Upon settling on the seabed, they undergo metamorphosis, developing into polyps capable of initiating new colonies.

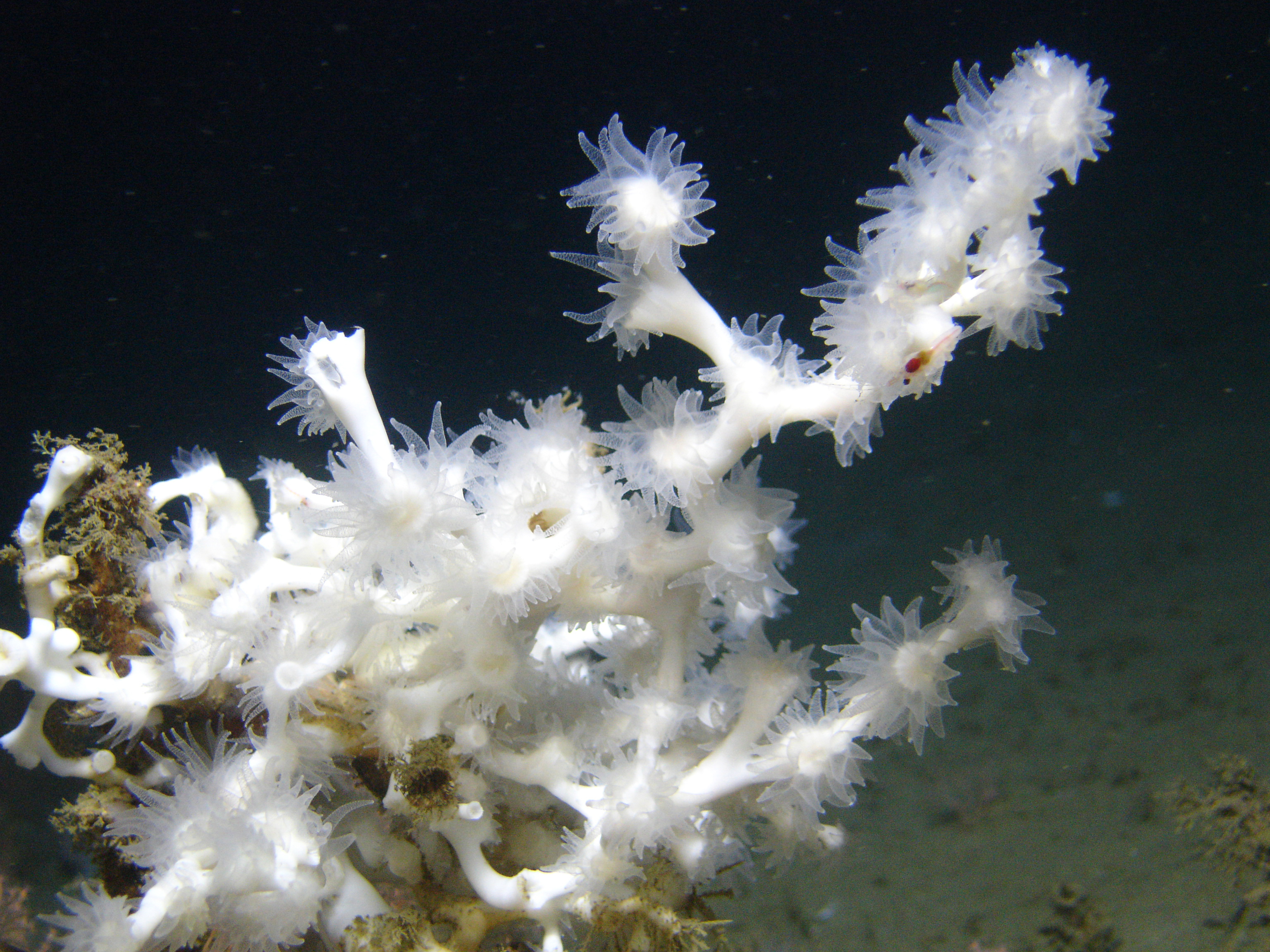
New polyps grow on the outer edges when Lophelia pertusa experiences budding or regeneration.

Lophelia reefs can grow to 35 m (115 ft) high. The largest recorded Lophelia reef, Røst Reef, measures 3 km × 35 km (1.9 mi × 21.7 mi) and lies at a depth of 300–400 m (980–1,310 ft) off the Lofoten Islands, Norway. These reefs are ancient, with a growth rate of around 1 mm per year.

Polyps at the end of branches feed by extending their tentacles and straining plankton from the seawater. They are able to ingest particles of up to 2 cm, and are able to discriminate between food and sediment using their chemoreceptors to differentiate between the two. Growth of polyps depends on environmental factors such as food availability, water quality, and how the water flows.

L. pertusa are considered to be opportunistic feeders since they feed on particles of organic matter that have been broken down. Hence, the spring bloom of phytoplankton and subsequent zooplankton blooms provide the main source of nutrient input to the deep sea. This rain of dead plankton is visible on photographs of the seabed and stimulates a seasonal cycle of growth and reproduction in Lophelia. This cycle is recorded in patterns of growth, and can be studied to investigate climatic variation in the recent past.

== Conservation status ==
L. pertusa was listed under CITES Appendix II in January 1990, meaning that the United Nations Environmental Programme recognizes that this species is not necessarily currently threatened with extinction but that it may become so in the future. CITES is a means of restricting international trade in endangered species, which is not a major threat to the survival of L. pertusa. The OSPAR Commission for the protection of the marine environment of the North-East Atlantic have recognized Lophelia pertusa reefs as a threatened habitat in need of protection.

The primary threats arise from the devastation of reefs caused by the use of heavy deep-sea trawl nets, specifically aimed at catching redfish or grenadiers. These nets, equipped with heavy metal "doors" to keep the net open, and a "footline" fitted with large metal "rollers," are dragged across the seabed, inflicting severe damage on coral. Given the slow growth rate of coral, this practice is unlikely to be sustainable in the long term.

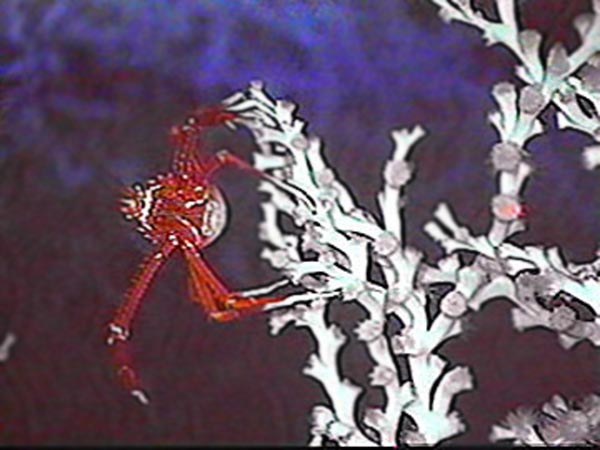
A squat lobster living on a Lophelia reef

Scientists estimate that trawling has damaged or destroyed 30%–50% of the Norwegian shelf coral area. The International Council for the Exploration of the Sea, the European Commission's main scientific advisor on fisheries and environmental issues in the northeast Atlantic, recommend mapping and then closing all of Europe's deep corals to fishing trawlers.

In 1999, the Norwegian Ministry of Fisheries closed an area of 1,000 square kilometres (390 mi^{2}) at Sula, including the large reef, to bottom trawling. In 2000, an additional area closed, covering about 600 square kilometres (230 mi^{2}). An area of about 300 square kilometres (120 mi^{2}) enclosing the Røst Reef closed to bottom trawling in 2002. Bottom trawling leads to siltation or sand deposition, which involves the disturbance of underlying sediments and nutrients. This harmful process destroys and decreases the growth of coral reefs, affecting the expansion of polyp budding.

In recent years, environmental organizations such as Greenpeace have argued that exploration for oil on the north west continental shelf slopes of Europe should be curtailed due to the possibility that is it damaging to the Lophelia reefs - conversely, Lophelia has recently been observed growing on the legs of oil installations, specifically the Brent Spar rig which Greenpeace campaigned to remove. At the time, the growth of L. pertusa on the legs of oil rigs was considered unusual, although recent studies have shown this to be a common occurrence, with 13 of 14 North Sea oil rigs examined having L. pertusa colonies. The authors of the original work suggested that it may be better to leave the lower parts of such structures in place— a suggestion opposed by Greenpeace campaigner Simon Reddy, who compared it to "[dumping] a car in a wood – moss would grow on it, and if I was lucky a bird may even nest in it. But this is not justification to fill our forests with disused cars".

Recovery of damaged L.pertusa will be a slow process not only due to its slow growth rate, but also due to its low rates of colonization and recolonization process. This is because even if L.pertusa produces a dispersive larva, a sediment free surface is required to initiate a new settlement. Moreover, excessive sedimentation and chemical contaminants will negatively impact the larvae, even when they are available in large numbers.

As ocean temperatures continue to rise due to global warming, climate change is another deadly factor that threatens the existence of L. pertusa. Although L. pertusa can survive changes in oxygen levels during periods of hypoxia and anoxia, they are vulnerable to sudden temperature changes. These fluctuations in temperature affect their metabolic rate, which has detrimental consequences regarding their energy input and growth.

== Ecological significance ==
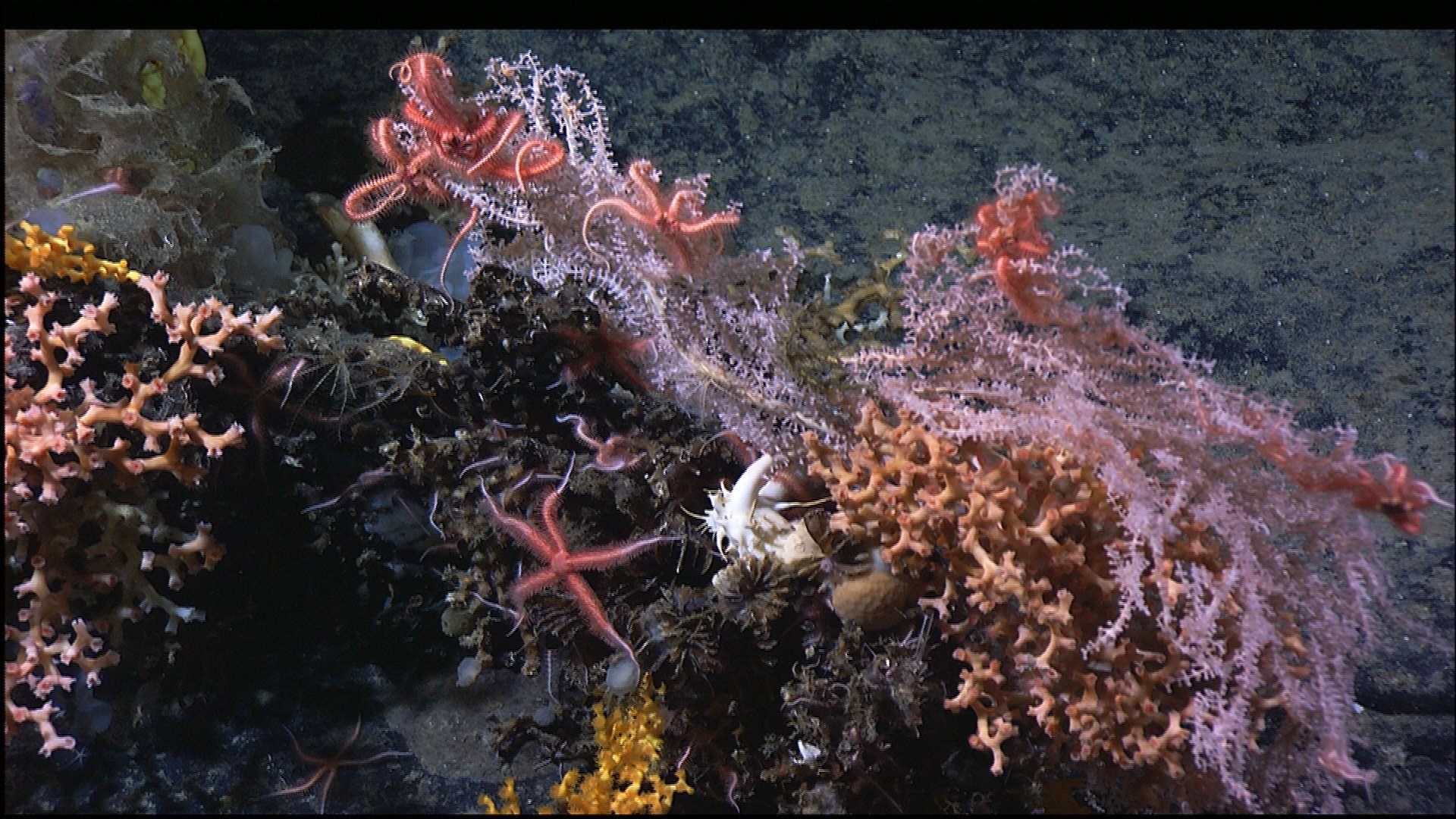
L. pertusa in its ecological environment.

Lophelia beds create a specialized habitat favored by some species of deep water fishes. Surveys have recorded that conger eels, sharks, groupers, hake and the invertebrate community consisting of brittle stars, molluscs, amphipods and crabs reside on these beds. High densities of smaller fish such as hatchetfish and lanternfish have been recorded in the waters over Lophelia beds, indicating they may be important prey items for the larger fish below.

L. pertusa also forms a symbiosis with polychaete Eunice norvegica. It is suggested that E. norvegica positively influences L. pertusa by forming connecting tubes, which are later calcified, in order to strengthen the reef frameworks. While E. norvegica requires partial consumption of the food obtained by L. pertusa, E. norvegica aids in cleaning the living coral framework and protecting it from potential predators.

Foraminiferans including Hyrrokkin sarcophaga also carry out a parasitic relationship with L. pertusa by attaching to polyps on the coral. Although settlement and reproduction are carried out by H. sarchophaga, this parasitism is not detrimental to the coral.

== Range ==
L. pertusa has been reported from Anguilla, Bahamas, Bermuda, Brazil, Canada, Cape Verde, Colombia, Cuba, Cyprus, Ecuador, Faroe Islands, France, French Southern Territories, Greece, Grenada, Iceland, India, Ireland, Italy, Jamaica, Japan, Madagascar, Mexico, Montserrat, Norway, Portugal, Puerto Rico, Saint Helena, Saint Kitts and Nevis, Saint Vincent and the Grenadines, Senegal, South Africa, United Kingdom, United States of America, U.S. Virgin Islands and Wallis and Futuna Islands.
