= Index of recreational dive sites =

Alphabetical listing of articles on porular places for recreational diving

The following index is provided as an overview of and topical guide to Wikipedia's articles on recreational dive sites. The level of coverage may vary:

- Recreational dive sites – specific places that recreational divers go to enjoy the underwater environment or are used for training purposes.

== 1 – 9 ==
- 115 (barge) – American whaleback barge

== A ==
- HMS A1 – The Royal Navy's first British-designed submarine
- HMS A3 – A-class submarine of the Royal Navy
- USS Aaron Ward – Gleaves-class destroyer of the United States Navy
- Abessinia – German ship wrecked at the Farne Islands in 1921. Now a dive site
- USS Accokeek – Auxiliary ocean tug of the United States Navy,
- Addo Elephant National Park Marine Protected Area – Marine conservation area in South Africa
- HMAS Adelaide – Frigate of the Royal Australian Navy, lead ship of the class
- SS Admiral Sampson – American-flagged cargo and passenger steamship
- MV Adolphus Busch – Ship sunk off Looe Key, Florida, as an artificial reef and dive site
- Aeolian Sky – Greek registered freighter sunk off Dorset after a collision
- USS Aeolus – Attack cargo ship converted into a cable repair ship
- Agat World War II Amtrac – Sunken amphibious tracked landing vehicle
- SS Ajax – Cargo steamship that was built in Germany in 1923
- Albert C. Field – Canadian cargo ship, sunk off the Needles during World War II
- Akumal – Community in Quintana Roo state, Mexico
- USS Algol – Andromeda-class attack cargo ship
- SS Algoma – Screw steamer sunk on Lake Superior
- Aliwal Shoal – A rocky reef off the coast of KwaZulu-Natal, South Africa
- Aliwal Shoal Marine Protected Area – Marine conservation area at Aliwal Shoal off the coast of KwaZulu-Natal, South Africa
- Alondra – English steamer wrecked off Ireland
- Al Munassir – Amphibious warfare vessel operated by the Royal Navy of Oman
- Alphard banks – Seamount on the Agulhas Bank
- Amaryllis – Canadian cargo ship
- Amed (Bali) – Group of fishing villages in Karangasem Regency on the north coast of Bali
- SS America – Steam packet wrecked off Isle Royale in Lake Superior
- USS Anderson – Sims-class destroyer
- Andrea Doria – Genoa registered passenger liner of the Italian line sunk after a collision off Massachusetts
- Anilao – Region popular for diving tourism – Marine protected sanctuary in Mabini, Batangas
- Antilla – Hamburg America Line cargo ship scuttled in 1940 off Aruba
- Antilles – French cruise ship that ran aground and sank off Mustique
- Apo Island – Volcanic island in Visayas, Philippines
- Apo Reef – Coral reef in the Philippines
- USS Apogon – Balao-class submarine
- SS Appomattox – Largest wooden steamship on the Great Lakes wrecked in 1905
- Aquila – British built cargo ship sunk off Ambon
- Aratama Maru – Japanese munitions transport ship sunk at Guam
- Arctic – Tugboat used in the Great Lakes of North America
- USS Arkansas – Dreadnought battleship of the United States Navy
- SS Arratoon Apcar – 19th-century British steamship that is now a wreck in Florida
- Arrecifes de Cozumel National Park – Marine protected area in the Cozumel reef system off Mexico
- USS Arthur W. Radford – Spruance-class destroyer in the United States Navy
- USS Atlanta – Atlanta-class light cruiser

== B ==
- Bangaram Atoll – Atoll in the Union Territory of Lakshadweep, India
- Bay of Pigs – Bay on the island of Cuba
- HMAS Bayonet – Attack-class patrol boat of the Royal Australian Navy
- Belize Barrier Reef – Series of coral reefs straddling the coast of Belize
- Bellubera – Ferry operated by the Port Jackson & Manly Steamship Company
- SS Ben Doran – Steam fishing trawler that operated out of Aberdeen
- SS Benwood – Steam cargo ship of the early twentieth century
- Bianca C. – Passenger ship sunk off Grenada
- USCGC Bibb – Secretary-Class Coast Guard ship
- SS Binnendijk – Dutch cargo steamship sunk by a mine off Portland Bill in the English Channel
- Biscayne National Park – U.S. national park in South Florida
- HMSAS Bloemfontein – Algerine-class minesweeper built for the Royal Navy in Canada during World War II
- Blue Grotto (Malta) – Sea caverns in Malta
- Blue Hole (Red Sea) – Submarine sinkhole north of Dahab, Egypt
- HMS Boadicea – B-class destroyer of the Royal Navy, sunk by enemy action in Lyme Bay
- Boesmansgat – Sinkhole and dive site in South Africa
- Bohol Sea – Marginal sea between the Visayas and Mindanao in the Philippines
- Booya – Schooner wrecked in Darwin, Australia
- BOS 400 – Wreck and dive site at Duiker Point on the Cape Peninsula west coast
- Bottle Island – One of the Summer Isles in Loch Broom, Scotland
- Bowie Seamount – Submarine volcano in the northeastern Pacific Ocean
- Breda – Dutch ship sunk off Scotland in 1940, now a recreational dive site.
- Brian Davis – Iris-class buoy tender
- HMAS Brisbane – Perth-class guided missile destroyer of the Royal Australian Navy sunk as a dive site off the Queensland coast
- HMHS Britannic – Olympic-class ocean liner
- Bud Bar – Artificial reef near Boynton Beach, Florida
- Bullhead Point Historical and Archeological District – Historic district in Wisconsin, United States
- Bulli Point – Diving location in Lake Taupō, New Zealand
- Bunaken – Island at the northern tip of Sulawesi in Indonesia
- Bunaken National Park – Marine park in the north of Sulawesi island, Indonesia
- Bungsberg – German cargo ship sunk near Tallinn, Estonia
- Byron – Schooner that sank in Lake Michigan

== C ==
- Cagdanao – Island in the province of Palawan in the Philippines
- Cahuita National Park – Terrestrial and marine national park in Costa Rica
- Calve Island – Uninhabited island on the west coast of Scotland
- HMAS Canberra – Adelaide class guided missile frigate of the Royal Australian Navy scuttled as dive site off Barwon Heads, Victoria
- Cancún Underwater Museum – Underwater display of sculpture in Cancún, Mexico
- HMCS Cape Breton – Royal Canadian Navy Cape-class maintenance ship
- USCGC Cape Henlopen – Type "C" Cape-class coast guard cutter
- Capernwray Dive Centre – Flooded quarry in Lancashire, England, used as a recreational dive site.
- Captain Keith Tibbetts – Former Cuban Navy Koni II-class frigate scuttled in shallow water in Cayman Brac
- Capurganá – Tourist destination of Colombia
- Carl D. Bradley – Self-unloading Great Lakes freighter that sank in a Lake Michigan storm
- USS Carlisle – Attack transport sunk at Bikini atoll
- Carnatic – British steamship wrecked in the gulf of Suez
- Carthaginian II – Steel sailing vessel sunk as artificial reef
- SS Cayuga – American freighter, in service 1889–1895
- SS Cedarville – Great lakes bulk carrier wrecked in a collision
- Cenote – Natural pit or sinkhole that exposes groundwater underneath
- SS Charles S. Price – Ship sunk in Lake Huron in 1913
- HMCS Chaudière – Restigouche-class destroyer of the Royal Canadian Navy
- ROCS Chen Hai – Casa Grande-class dock landing ship
- Chesil Cove – Massive curved slope of shingle, at Chesil Beach in Dorset, England
- SS Chester A. Congdon – American Great Lakes freighter 1907-1918
- Chinhoyi Caves – Group of caves in north central Zimbabwe
- Christina Nilsson – Schooner that sank in Lake Michigan
- Christ of the Abyss – Submerged statue of Jesus Christ
- Chuuk Lagoon – A sheltered body of water in the central Pacific in the Federated States of Micronesia
- Chuuk Lagoon – Atoll in the Federated States of Micronesia
- Chuuk State – State in the Federated States of Micronesia
- Circle of Heroes – Underwater military memorial in Florida
- Ċirkewwa – Harbour in Malta
- City of Bangor – Great Lakes freighter that sank in Lake Superior
- SS City of Everett – American whaleback steamship
- SS City of Launceston – Steamship operated by the Launceston and Melbourne Steam Navigation Company
- SS Clan Ranald – Turret deck steamship that sank off the Yorke Peninsula, South Australia
- SS Clifton – Whaleback Great Lakes freighter
- Cliff Villa Peninsula – Promontory in Bandabou, Curaçao
- Cobb Seamount – Underwater volcano west of Grays Harbor, Washington, United States
- Cocklebiddy cave – Large flooded cave in Western Australia
- Cod Hole – Dive site in Queensland, Australia
- USCGC Comanche – Coast guard cutter
- SS Comet – 1857 steamship, only treasure ship of Lake Superior
- Constandis – Fishing vessel sunk as a recreational dive site in Limassol Bay, Cyprus
- HMAS Coogee – Passenger ferry that briefly served as a Royal Australian Navy armed patrol vessel
- SMS Cormoran – German armed merchant raider of WWI scuttled at Guam
- HMS Coronation – 90-gun second-rate ship of the line of the English Royal Navy
- Coron Bay – Bight in Palawan, Philippines
- Coron Island – Island in the Calamian Islands in Palawan in the Philippines
- Cozumel – Island in Quintana Roo, Mexico
- Crusader – Australian Army amphibious operations support ship of World War II
- USS Curb – Diver-class rescue and salvage ship
- PS Cumberland – Wooden-hulled side paddlewheeler wrecked in Lake Superior
- USCGC Cuyahoga – US Coast Guard Active-class patrol boat

== D ==
- Daedalus Reef – Reef in the Egyptian Red Sea
- MV Dania – Cargo ship scuttled as a dive site off Bamburi, Kenya
- Daniel Lyons – Schooner that sank in Lake Michigan
- David Tucker – Steel-hulled patrol boat of the 95-Foot or Cape class
- Dean's Blue Hole – Deep water-filled sinkhole in the Bahamas
- Devil's Throat at Punta Sur – Underwater cave near Cozumel, Mexico
- Dhilba Guuranda–Innes National Park – Protected area in the Yorke Peninsula, South Australia
- MV Diamond knot – Cargo ship of the United States
- Dinorwic quarry – Former slate quarry in north Wales
- Dive sites of the Table Mountain National Park Marine Protected Area – Recreational dive sites around the Cape Peninsula
- Dive sites of Whittle Rock reef – Recreational dive sites in False Bay, South Africa
- Diving in East Timor – Recreational diving region description
- Diving in the Maldives – Recreational diving region description
- Diving sites in Ko Tao – Region of Thailand known as a recreational diving destination
- Dorothea Quarry, Nantlle Valley, Gwynedd, North Wales.
- Dos Ojos – Flooded cave system in the Yucatan Peninsula, Mexico
- Dosthill quarry – Flooded quarry in England used for scuba diving
- Dragon Hole – Deep underwater sinkhole in the South China Sea
- SMS Dresden (1917) – Light cruiser of the German Imperial Navy
- SS D.R. Hanna – 552-foot steel freighter that sank on Lake Huron in 1919
- USCGC Duane – United States Coast Guard cutter
- SS Dunraven – British cargo vessel wrecked in the Gulf of Suez
- Dutch Springs – Flooded quarry in Pennsylvania used as a recreational diving site
- SS Dwight L. Moody – Liberty ship of WWII
- Dzibilchaltun – Maya archaeological site with cenote in Yucatan, Mexico

== E ==
- Eagle – Freighter sunk as an artificial reef in Florida
- SS Eastfield – Ship sunk off Cornwall in 1917, now a dive site
- SS Eber Ward – Package freighter sunk in the Straits of Mackinac
- Eccleston Quarry – Flooded quarry used as a recreational dive site
- Edithburgh jetty – Coastal town in South Australia
- SS Edgar E. Clark – American Liberty ship
- Edmonds Underwater Park – Recreational dive site in Seattle, Washington
- SS Egypt – Ocean liner which sunk in 1922
- El Gouna – Egyptian Red Sea resort city
- El Ikhwa Islands – Two islands in the Egyptian Red Sea
- HMT Elk – British trawler sunk off Plymouth in 1940
- SS Ellengowan – Schooner shipwrecked in Darwin, Australia
- Elm Hole – Cave in Llangattock, Powys, Wales
- Elphinstone Reef – Small reef in the Egyptian Red Sea
- USS Emmons – Gleaves-class destroyer
- SS Emperor – Canadian Great Lakes freighter 1910-1947
- RMS Empress of Ireland – Canadian ocean liner that sank in 1914
- Engelbrecht Cave – Cave system in South Australia
- SS Erie L. Hackley – Passenger and cargo ship that operated in Lake Michigan
- SS Espagne – Belgian cargo ship sunk in English Channel
- SS Etruria – Steel freighter that sank on Lake Huron in 1905
- Eyemouth – Coastal town in Berwickshire, Scotland
- Ewens Ponds – Flooded sinkholes in South Australia

== F ==
- Falls of Lora – Tidal race at the mouth of Loch Etive in Argyll and Bute, Scotland
- HMS Falmouth – Town-class light cruiser of the Royal Navy sunk off Flamborough Head, Yorkshire by German submarines
- False Bay – Bay of the Atlantic Ocean at South Africa
- Fanadir – Recreational dive site in the Red Sea
- Farne Islands – Island group off Northumberland, England
- Fifi – Tugboat that caught fire and sank in Bahrain
- Finger Lakes Underwater Preserve Association – Organization to promote conservation of the New York State's Finger Lakes
- Fleetwing – Schooner that sank in Lake Michigan
- Fontana
- Fort Bovisand – Coastal fort in Devon, England
- Fossil Cave – A flooded cave in the Limestone Coast region of South Australia
- Fowey Rocks Light – Lighthouse on Key Biscayne, Florida, United States
- SS Francisco Morazan – German built cargo ship wrecked in Lake Michigan
- SS Francis Hinton – Wooden-hulled steam barge sunk in Lake Michigan
- SS Frank O'Connor – Bulk carrier that sank in Lake Michigan
- Frederiksted Pier – Cruise ship pier in Saint Croix, U.S. Virgin Islands
- French Reef – Coral reef in the Florida Keys, US
- F.T. Barney – American schooner that sank in Lake Huron in 1868
- Fujikawa Maru – Japanese armed transport ship sunk in Truk lagoon
- Japanese destroyer Fumizuki – Mutsuki-class destroyer of the Imperial Japanese Navy sunk at Truk

== G ==
- Gallinipper – Schooner that sank in Lake Michigan
- Gamul Kebir – Recreational dive site of Egypt in the Red Sea
- SMS Geier – Unprotected cruiser of the German Imperial Navy
- SATS General Botha – British cruiser, 1885–1947
- USNS General Hoyt S. Vandenberg – US Navy transport ship sunk as artificial reef at Key West
- SS George Dewey – Liberty ship of WWII
- George A. Marsh – Three-masted schooner sunk in Lake Ontario
- Georg Thiele – Type 1934 class destroyer
- German submarine U-40 (1938) – German submarine sunk by a mine in the English Channel
- German submarine U-352 – German World War II submarine
- German submarine U-1195 – German World War II submarine
- Għar Qawqla – Limestone formation off Marsalforn on the island of Gozo in Malta
- HMS Ghurka – Tribal-class destroyer of the Royal Navy sunk off Dungeness by a German mine
- Gibraltar Artificial Reef – Collection of sunken wrecks
- Gili Islands – Three small islands off Lombok, Indonesia
- USS Gilliam – Attack transport ship sunk at Bikini atoll
- Ginnie Springs – Spring in Florida used for water sports
- SS Glenlyon – Freighter sunk off the shore of Isle Royale in Lake Superior
- Glen Strathallan – British ship scuttled in Plymouth sound as a dive site
- SAS Good Hope – Loch-class frigate in the South African Navy
- HMAS Goorangai – Auxiliary minesweeper of the Royal Australian Navy
- SS Gothenburg – British steamship wrecked on the Great Barrier Reef
- Grace A. Channon – Three masted schooner built in Michigan
- Great Barrier Reef – Coral reef system in Queensland, Australia, World Heritage Site
- SS Grecian
- Great Blue Hole – Marine sinkhole off the coast of Belize
- Green Banana Hole – Blue hole off the coast of Sarasota, Florida
- Great Southern Reef – Australian reef system
- Green Bay (shipwreck) – Name given to an unidentified sloop that sank in Lake Michigan
- MV Gregory Poole – Admirable-class minesweeper
- Guadalupe Island Biosphere Reserve – Natural reserve in Mexico
- Gutter Sound – Sound in Scapa Flow, Orkney, United Kingdom

== H ==
- Hamilla Mitchell – Shipwreck and treasure recovery
- Hand Deeps – Area of the English Channel off the south coast of Cornwall
- Haql – City and Governorate in Tabuk Province, Saudi Arabia
- MT Haven – Crude oil carrier that sank off the coast of Genoa, Italy in 1991
- Heian Maru – Japanese ocean liner and auxiliary submarine tender
- SS Henry Chisholm – Wooden freighter wrecked in isle royale
- MT Hephaestus – Bunkering oil tanker which ran aground off Qawra, Malta
- Heron Island (Queensland) – Coral cay in Queensland, Australia
- Hermann Künne – Type 1936-class destroyer
- HMS Hermes – 1924 unique aircraft carrier
- Herzogin Cecilie – German-built four-masted barque wrecked near Salcombe
- SS Hesrer – Bulk-freighter steamship that sank in Lake Superior
- Hilsea Point Rock – Group of pinnacles in the English Channel off Devon
- Hilma Hooker – Shipwreck in Bonaire in the Caribbean Netherlands
- Hispania – Swedish steamship wrecked in the Sound of Mull, now a dive site
- Hluleka Marine Protected Area – Marine conservation area in the Eastern Cape in South Africa
- HMAS Hobart – Former guided missile destroyer of the Royal Australian Navy scuttled off Yankalilla Bay in South Australia
- Hoi Ha Wan – Bay in a marine park in Hong Kong
- Hol Chan Marine Reserve – Marine reserve off the coast of Belize
- Home – Two-masted schooner which sank in Lake Michigan
- HMS Hood – Royal Sovereign-class battleship of the Royal Navy scuttled in Portland Harbour
- Hotel Terme Millepini – Hotel with 40m deep underwater diving pool
- Hranice Abyss – Flooded sinkhole near the town of Hranice, Czech Republic
- SS Hydrus

== I ==
- Igara – Bulk carrier wrecked off the east coast of Malaysia and partly salvaged
- USS Indra – Landing craft repair ship built for the United States Navy during World War II
- Inland Sea, Gozo – Seawater lagoon on Gozo, Malta
- SS Ironsides – Wooden-hulled American package freighter on Great Lakes service
- SS Isaac M. Scott – American Great Lakes freighter
- iSimangaliso Marine Protected Area – Marine conservation area in northern kwaZulu-Natal in South Africa
- Island City – Schooner that sank in Lake Michigan

== J ==
- HMAS J1 – J class submarine
- HMAS J2 – J class submarine
- HMAS J4 – J class submarine
- HMAS J5 – British submarine, 1915–1926
- Jacob's Well (Texas) – Perennial karstic spring in the Texas Hill Country
- SS James Caldwell – Liberty ship of WWII
- James Eagan Layne – Liberty ship sunk off Cornwall, now a dive site
- Japanese cruiser Sakawa – Agano-class light cruiser
- Japanese destroyer Oite – Kamikaze-class destroyer built for the Imperial Japanese Navy during the 1920s
- John Pennekamp Coral Reef State Park – State park at Key Largo, Florida, USA
- SS John V. Moran – American package freighter
- Jordbrugrotta – Cave system in Norway
- J.S. Seaverns – Shipwreck and dive site in Lake Superior
- Jura – Wooden, flush deck, paddle steamer,
- Jutten Island Marine Protected Area – Marine conservation area in Saldanha Bay in South Africa

== K ==
- Kadmat Island – Coral island of the Lakshadweep archipelago in India
- SS Kamloops – Lake freighter of Canada Steamship Lines
- Kashi Maru – Japanese auxiliary minelayer, now a dive site in the Solomon Islands
- PS Keystone State – American paddle steamer
- SS Keystorm – Shipwreck in the Great Lakes off Ontario in 1912
- King Cruiser – Car ferry of that sank off the West Coast of Southern Thailand
- Kizugawa Maru – World War II-era Japanese freighter ship
- Ko Tao – Island subdistrict in Surat Thani, Thailand
- Krapanj – Island in the Adriatic Sea, south of Šibenik, Croatia
- Kristu tal-Baħħara – Christ of the Mariners, underwater statue off Malta
- SMS Kronprinz – German battleship scuttled in Scapa Flow
- Kyarra – Cargo and passenger luxury liner torpedoed and sunk near Swanage
- Kyle Spangler (schooner) Shipwreck Site – Shipwreck in Lake Huron, US

== L ==
- PS Lady Elgin – American sidewheel steamship
- Lady Thetis – Cypriot passenger ship sunk for use as a recreational dive site
- HMS Laforey – Royal Navy destroyer sunk by a mine off Sussex
- SS Lakeland – Steel ship wrecked in Lake Michigan
- USS Lamson – Mahan-class destroyer
- Langebaan Lagoon Marine Protected Area – Marine conservation area in South Africa
- SS Laurentic – British ocean liner sunk by mines in 1917
- MV Liberty – Russian cargo ship
- USAT Liberty – United States Army cargo ship torpedoed by Japanese submarine and beached on the island of Bali.
- Lighthouse Reef – Atoll off the coast of Belize
- List of shipwrecks in the Thunder Bay National Marine Sanctuary
- Little Blue Lake – Flooded sinkhole dive site in South Australia
- Loch Long – Sea-loch in Argyll and Bute, Scotland
- MS Logna – First ship intentionally sunk as artificial reef and recreational dive site in the Bahamas
- Logue Brook Dam – Dam in Western Australia
- SS Louisiana – Steamboat that sank in Lake Michigan
- Louis Sheid – Belgian ship sunk off Devon on 1939. Now a recreational dive site
- SS L.R. Doty – Great Lakes steamship lost in Lake Michigan
- USS LST-507 – US Tank landing ship sunk off the south coast of England, now a dive site
- Lumberman – Schooner that sank in Lake Michigan
- RMS Lusitania – British ocean liner (1907–1915)

== M ==
- HMS M2 – Royal Navy submarine monitor wrecked in Lyme Bay
- HMCS Mackenzie
- Madeira – Barge that sank in Lake Superior in 1905
- Magic Point – Coastal headland in Sydney, New South Wales, Australia
- Maine – British ship sunk in 1917 near Dartmouth, Devon. Now a recreational dive site
- Major General Wallace F. Randolph – Mine planter of The US Army
- Makna, Saudi Arabia – Town in Tabuk province, Saudi Arabia
- Malgas Island Marine Protected Area – Marine conservation area on the west coast in the Western Cape province in South Africa
- Malapascua – Island in the Philippines
- Maloja – UK registered passenger steamship sunk by a mine off Dover
- Maltese patrol boat P29 – Ship scuttled as dive site off Malta
- Maltese patrol boat P31 – Minesweeper/patrol boat scuttled for use as a recreational dive site
- The Manacles – Set of treacherous rocks off The Lizard peninsula in Cornwall
- Mantanani Islands – Group of three islands off the north-west coast of Sabah, Malaysia
- HMS Maori – Royal Navy Tribal class destroyer sunk in Malta
- SS Manasoo – Canadian steamship launched in 1888
- SS Maori – Shoreline historical wreck in Leeugat Bay on the Cape Peninsula west coast
- Marguerite – French ship sunk in Lyme Bay in 1917. Now a dive site
- Maritime Heritage Trail – Battle of Saipan – A group of WWII wrecks in the lagoon at Saipan in the Northern Mariana Islands
- SMS Markgraf – German battleship scuttled in Scapa Flow
- SS Marquette – Wooden-hulled, American Great Lakes freighter
- Marsa Alam – Town in the Red Sea Governorate, Egypt
- Martin's Haven – Bay in Pembrokeshire, Wales, UK,
- SS Mauna Loa – Cargo steam-ship sunk in the bombing of Darwin
- Mayflower – Wooden hulled scow schooner that sank in Lake Superior
- USAT Meigs – United States Army transport ship sunk in Darwin Harbour
- Memba Bay – Bay in Nampula Province, Mozambique
- Mendi – Passenger steamship that sank after a collision south of the Isle of Wight
- MV Mercedes I – Merchant ship built in 1952 in Hamburg, Germany
- Merkanti Reef – Artificial reef at St. Julian's, Malta
- USCGC Mesquite – Seagoing buoy tender scuttled in Lake Superior
- Metamora – Wooden tug wrecked in the Georgian Bay area of Ontario
- Michigan Underwater Preserves – Protected areas of the Great Lakes on Michigan's coast
- SS Midland City – Canadian passenger and cargo vessel on the Great Lakes
- Mikhail Lermontov – Soviet cruise liner wrecked in the Marlborough Sounds, New Zealand
- SS Milwaukee – Great lakes train ferry that foundered in a storm
- USS Mindanao – US Navy Luzon-class internal combustion engine repair ship in service 1943-1947
- Minnedosa – Wooden Great Lakes schooner
- SS Miowera – Passenger and refrigerated cargo liner
- USS Mizpah – United States Navy patrol yacht
- Miztac – Schooner barge sunk in Lake Superior
- SS M.M. Drake – American steam barge that sank in Lake Superior
- USCGC Mohawk – US Coastguard cutter sunk as artificial reef off south-west Florida
- Mohegan – Steamer wrecked off the coast of the Lizard Peninsula, Cornwall
- Molasses Reef – Coral reef located within the Florida Keys National Marine Sanctuary
- RMS Moldavia – British ship sunk in 1918 off Beachy Head, now a dive site
- Molinere Underwater Sculpture Park – Collection of underwater contemporary art off Grenada in the Caribbean
- Molnár János Cave – Water-filled cave in Budapest, Hungary
- Molokini – Islet in Maui County, Hawaii
- SS Monarch – Passenger-package freighter that sank in Lake Superior
- USS Monitor – First ironclad of the US Navy, 1861–1862
- SS Monrovia – French cargo ship
- HMS Montagu – Pre-dreadnought battleship of the British Royal Navy wrecked on Lundy Island
- Mount Storm Lake – Cooling water reservoir in West Virginia, U.S.
- MV RMS Mulheim – German owned container ship wrecked at Land's End, United Kingdom
- USS Muliphen – Andromeda-class attack cargo ship
- SS Myron – Wooden steamship that sank in Lake Superior

== N ==
- Nagato – Super-dreadnought sunk by nuclear test in Bikini atoll
- Namaqua National Park Marine Protected Area – Marine conservation area in Namaqualand in the Northern Cape, in South Africa
- National Diving and Activity Centre – Flooded quarry in Gloucestershire used as a recreational dive site
- Neptune Islands – Two groups of islands in South Australia
- Nereo Cave – Sea cave in Sardinia, Italy
- USS New York – Second United States Navy armored cruiser so designated
- Niagara (1845 steamboat) – Side-wheel palace steamer sunk in Lake Michigan
- Niagara (tug) – Tugboat which worked in the Great Lakes
- HMCS Nipigon – Annapolis-class destroyer of the Royal Canadian Navy
- Nohoch Nah Chich – Flooded cave system in Mexico
- SS Norman – Shipwreck in Lake Huron, Michigan, United States
- Northerner – Shipwreck in Lake Michigan

== O ==
- Oceana – Cargo and passenger ship sunk off Beachy Head after a collision
- Octopus Hole – A designated conservation area on the Washington's Hood Canal.
- Octopus Hole Conservation Area – Designated conservation area on Washington's Hood Canal
- Ogof Agen Allwedd – Cave in Llangattock, Powys, Wales
- Oite – Kamikaze-class destroyer built for the Imperial Japanese Navy during the 1920s
- SS Onoko – Iron hulled Great Lakes freighter
- USS Oriskany – Essex class aircraft carrier sunk to create an artificial reef
- Osborne Reef – Artificial reef off Fort Lauderdale, Florida, US
- Oslofjord – Ocean liner sunk after hitting a mine off the River Tyne
- Osprey Reef – Submerged atoll northeast of Queensland, Australia
- Ox Bel Ha – Flooded cave system in Quintana Roo, Mexico
- Ozone – Paddle steamer built in Scotland in 1886

== P ==
- P29 – Ship scuttled as dive site off Malta
- P31 – Minesweeper/patrol boat scuttled for use as a recreational dive site
- Palancar Reef – Coral reef off Cozumel, Mexico in the Caribbean sea
- Palmwood shipwreck – 17th century shipwreck in the Netherlands
- SS Panay – Passenger vessel built for the Great Western Railway
- Panglao, Bohol – Municipality in Bohol, Philippines
- SS Papoose – Oil tanker built in 1921
- Pearl and Hermes Atoll – Atoll of Hawaii
- Pearse Resurgence – Source of the Pearse Stream on Mt. Arthur, New Zealand South Island
- Pedernales – Lake tanker damaged by a torpedo at Aruba, where part of the ship remains
- Pedra da Risca do Meio Marine State Park – State park in Ceará, Brazil
- HMS Pelorus (J291) – Algerine-class minesweeper built for the Royal Navy during World War II
- Persier – British ship sunk in Plymouth Sound in 1945. Now a dive site
- HMAS Perth – Guided missile destroyer of the Australian Navy, sunk as a dive site off Western Australia
- Pescador Island – Island in Cebu, Philippines
- Petit Saint Vincent – Island in St. Vincent and the Grenadines
- SS Pewabic – Package freighter that served ports on the Upper Great Lakes
- Picanninnie Ponds – Recreational dive site in South Australia
- Piccaninnie Ponds Conservation Park – Protected area near Mount Gambier in South Australia
- SAS Pietermaritzburg – Algerine-class minesweeper built for the Royal Navy during World War II
- USS Pilotfish – Balao-class submarine sunk at Bikini atoll
- Piłsudski – Polish passenger ship sunk off the Yorkshire coast
- SS Pioneer – Steam dredging ship
- Pluragrotta – Flooded cave in Norway
- USCGC Point Swift – United States Coast Guard cutter
- Pollatoomary – Flooded cave in Ireland
- Pondoland Marine Protected Area – Marine conservation area in the Eastern Cape province of South Africa
- Pool Fisher – British merchant vessel that sank off the Isle of Wight
- Poor Knights Islands – Group of islands and marine reserve off the east coast of new Zealand's North Island
- Pope's Eye – Uncompleted foundation for an island fort at Port Philip, Victoria, Australia
- Porteau Cove Provincial Park – Place in British Columbia, Canada
- Porth Dafarch – Bay in western Anglesey, Wales
- Port Hughes jetty – Coastal town in South Australia
- SS Port Kembla – Steamer owned by the Commonwealth and Dominion Line
- HMS Port Napier – Royal Navy minelayer destroyed in Loch Alsh, Scotland, by an explosion following an engine room fire
- Port Noarlunga jetty – Recreational dive site in South Australia
- Port Noarlunga Reef – Recreational dive site in South Australia
- Portsea Hole – Seafloor depression in Port Phillip, Victoria, Australia
- President Coolidge – American ocean liner sunk by mines in the New Hebrides
- Preussen (ship) – German ship built in 1902
- Preußen – German steel-hulled five-masted ship-rigged windjammer sunk in Crab Bay after a collision
- HMS Prince of Wales – King George V-class battleship of the Royal Navy
- Protea banks – Reef about 7 km off the south coast of KwaZulu-Natal, South Africa
- Protea Banks Marine Protected Area – Marine conservation area in KwaZulu-Natal, South Africa
- Puerto Galera – Municipality in Oriental Mindoro, Philippines
- Punta Cana – Resort town in La Altagracia Province, Dominican Republic
- USS Puritan – Passenger ship that sank in Lake Superior

== Q ==
- PS Queen Victoria – Paddle steamer wrecked off the Baily Lighthouse, Ireland

== R ==
- Radaas – Ship sunk in 1917 near Portland Bill, now a dive site
- Rainbow Warrior – Greenpeace vessel bombed by French intelligence service operatives in Auckland harbour, refloated and scuttled as a dive site
- USS Rankin – US Navy Tolland-class attack cargo ship in service 1945–1947, 1952-1971
- Rapid Bay jetty – Recreational dive site in South Australia
- Ras Muhammad National Park – Egyptian national park in South Sinai
- Red Sea – Arm of the Indian Ocean between Asia and Africa
- SS Regina – Steel ship that foundered in Lake Huron in a storm
- HMS Repulse – 1916 Renown-class battlecruiser of the Royal Navy
- RMS Rhone – Royal Mail Ship wrecked off Salt Island in the British Virgin Islands in a hurricane
- Richelieu Rock – Dive site in Thailand in the Andaman Sea
- Risør Underwater Post Office – Norway tourist attraction
- Riva Palacio – Admirable-class minesweeper built for the United States Navy
- Robben Island Marine Protected Area – Marine conservation area in South Africa
- Robberg Nature Reserve and Marine Protected Area – Conservation area at the Robberg peninsula in South Africa
- Robert C. Pringle – Wooden-hulled American tugboat lost on Lake Michigan
- Robert Gaskin – Shipwreck in the St. Lawrence river
- SS Robert Wallace – Wooden steamship wrecked in Lake Superior in 1902
- Rocherpan Marine Protected Area – Marine conservation area on the west coast of the Western Cape in South Africa
- USS Rochester – Second United States Navy armored cruiser so designated
- Rondo – Ship sunk in Sound of Mull in 1935, now a recreational dive site
- Rosehill – Steam collier torpedoed and sunk near Fowey, Cornwall
- Rosinco – Diesel-powered luxury yacht that sank in Lake Michigan
- SS Rotorua – New Zealand Shipping Company steam ocean liner and refrigerated cargo ship
- Rouse Simmons – Three-masted schooner sunk in Lake Michigan
- Roy A. Jodrey – Canadian bulk carrier sunk in the St Lawrence river
- Royal Adelaide – Iron sailing ship wrecked on Chesil Beach
- Royal Charter – Steam clipper wrecked off Porth Alerth on the coast of Anglesey
- Rozi – Tugboat scuttled as a dive site off Malta
- Rum Jungle Lake – Flooded open cast mine near Darwin, Australia

== S ==
- Safaga – City on the Red Sea coast of Egypt
- Sagamore (barge) – Whaleback barge wrecked in Lake Superior
- HMS Safari – Royal Navy S-class submarine sunk in the English Channel while on tow to shipbreakers
- HMCS Saguenay – Destroyer of the Royal Canadian Navy
- USS Sailfish – Sargo-class submarine of the US Navy
- Sakawa – Agano-class light cruiser
- Salem Express – Car and passenger ferry wrecked off the Egyptian coast
- USS Salvia – Iris-class buoy tender
- Samaesan Hole – Deepest technical dive site in the Gulf of Thailand
- SS Samuem Mather – U.S. merchant ship that sank in Lake Superior
- Samuel P. Ely – Schooner wrecked in Lake Superior
- San Andrés (island) – Colombian island in the Caribbean
- Sanko Harvest – Bulk carrier that sank off Esperance, Western Australia
- San Pedro Nolasco Island – Mexican island in the Gulf of California
- USS Saratoga – US Navy aircraft carrier sunk by nuclear weapon testing at Bikini atoll
- Sardinia Bay Marine Protected Area – Marine conservation area in the Eastern Cape in South Africa
- HMCS Saskatchewan – Mackenzie-class destroyer of the Royal Canadian Navy
- Sardine run – Annual fish migration off the shores of South Africa
- Scapa Flow – Bay in the Orkney Islands, Scotland
- SS S.C. Baldwin – Wooden-hulled steam barge sunk in Lake Michigan
- USS Scrimmage – Admirable-class minesweeper built for the United States Navy
- USS Scuffle – Admirable class minesweeper sunk as an artificial reef off Cozumel
- HMS Scylla – Royal Navy frigate sunk as artificial reef off Whitsand Bay, Cornwall
- MS Seattle – German cargo ship sunk in 1940
- Second Valley – Coastal town in South Australia
- SS Selah Chamberlain – Great Lakes freighter that sank on Lake Michigan in 1886
- Seven Stones Reef – Rocky reef offshore of Land's End, Cornwall
- Shaʽb Abu Nuħas – Coral reef in the Red Sea
- Shadwan Island – Egyptian island in the Red Sea
- The Shaft (sinkhole) – Karst feature in South Australia
- Shark River Reef – Artificial reef off New Jersey
- Ship cemetery at Ekenabben – Place in Blekinge, Sweden
- List of shipwrecks of the United States
- HMS Sidon – Royal Navy submarine sunk in Portland Harbour by explosion of a faulty torpedo
- Silfra – Water-filled rift in Iceland between the North American and Eurasian tectonic plates
- Similan Islands – Marine protected area in Phang Nga Province, southern Thailand
- Sipadan – Oceanic island in Malaysia
- SS Sir William Seimens – American lake freighter (1896–1944)
- Slickstones Quarry, Cromhall – Quarry in Gloucestershire
- Socorro Island – Volcanic island off the west coast of Mexico
- Sodwana Bay – A National Park with marine protected area on the northern KwaZulu-Natal coast of South Africa
- Soma Bay – Coastal resort in the Red Sea Governorate, Egypt
- Sound of Mull – Sound between the Inner Hebridean island of Mull and mainland Scotland
- South Channel Fort – Island in southern Port Phillip, Victoria, Australia
- USCGC Spar – Iris class sea going buoy tender
- USS Spiegel Grove – US Navy dock landing ship sunk off Key Largo as an artificial reef
- St Abbs – Village in Berwickshire, Scotland
- St. Crispin's Reef – Part of the Great Barrier Reef, Queensland, Australia
- Stanegarth – Steam tugboat scuttled as a dive feature at Stoney Cove
- Stanwood – British ship sunk off Falmouth in 1939, now a recreational dive site
- Stella – Passenger ferry wrecked off the Casquets
- SS Stepas Darius – Liberty ship built in the United States during World War II
- Stilbaai Marine Protected Area – Marine conservation area in the Western Cape in South Africa
- HMS St Lawrence (1814) – First-rate wooden warship of the Royal Navy that served on Lake Ontario
- Stoney Cove – Flooded quarry in Leicestershire used for scuba diving
- Subic Bay – Bay on the west coast of the island of Luzon, Philippines
- Sund Rock – Conservation area on Hood Canal, Washington, USA
- SS Superior City – Freighter in the Great Lakes service that sank in Lake Superior
- HMS Swallow (1824) – Brig-sloop shipwreck in South Australia
- HMAS Swan – Australian "River" class destroyer sunk as a dive site off the coast of Dunsborough, Western Australia
- Swanage Pier – Pier in Swanage, Dorset, United Kingdom
- Sweepstakes (schooner) – Canadian Great Lakes ship sunk in 1885

== T ==
- Taba, Egypt – Town in South Sinai, Egypt
- Table Mountain National Park Marine Protected Area – Marine conservation area around the Cape Peninsula in South Africa
- Taganga – Fishing village and corregimiento in Magdalena, Colombia
- SS Tahoe – Steamship scuttled in Lake Tahoe
- USCGC Tamaroa – Coast guard cutter
- USS Tarpon – US Navy Submarine which foundered south of Cape Hatteras, North Carolina, while under tow to the scrap yard.
- Texas Clipper – Merchant marine training vessel with the Texas Maritime Academy
- HMS Thames (1885) – British cruiser, 1885–1947
- Thesis – Steamship wrecked in 1889 in the Sound of Mull, Scotland. Now a recreational dive site.
- Thistlegorm – British armed merchantman sunk in the Red Sea at Ras Muhammad
- Thomas Friant – Wooden-hulled fish tug
- Thomas Wilson – Whaleback freighter that sank in Lake Superior
- Thunder Bay National Marine Sanctuary – Aquatic protected area in Michigan, USA
- Thunderbolt Wreck – Mine planter of The US Army
- Toa Maru – Japanese transport ship sunk by a submarine off Gizo, Solomon Islands
- HMAS Tobruk (L 50) – Modified Round Table-class Landing Ship Heavy of the Royal Australian Navy
- Tokai Maru – Japanese passenger-cargo ship sunk in Apra Harbor, Guam
- Torrey Canyon – Suezmax Class oil tanker wrecked off the western coast of Cornwall
- SAS Transvaal – Loch-class frigate in the South African Navy
- MV Treasure – June 2000 environmental disaster off the coast of South Africa
- Tsitsikamma Marine Protected Area – Marine conservation area on the south coast of South Africa
- Tubbataha Reef – Protected area in the middle of the Sulu Sea
- HMNZS Tui – Conrad class oceanographic ship
- Tulagi – Small island in Solomon Islands, north of Guadalcanal
- Tulamben – Village in Karangasem, Bali Province, Indonesia
- Tung Ping Chau – Island in Hong Kong

== U ==
- U-40 – German submarine sunk by a mine in the English Channel
- U-352 – German submarine sunk by depth charges south of Morehead City, North Carolina
- U-1195 – German submarine sunk by antisubmarine mortar to the southeast of the Isle of Wight
- Um El Faroud – Libyan owned tanker scuttled as dive site off Malta
- Utila – Smallest of Islas de la Bahía, Honduras

== V ==
- Varvassi – Greek freighter wrecked at The Needles in a storm after engine failure
- USS Vermilion – Tolland-class attack cargo ship
- SS Vernon – American passenger and package freighter ship sunk in Lake Michigan
- Ve Skerries – Small islands in the west of Shetland
- SS Vienna – Steamship sunk after a collision in Lake Superior
- Vortex Spring – Freshwater spring and recreational dive site in Florida

== W ==
- HMNZS Waikato – Leander class frigate of the Royal New Zealand Navy
- Wakatobi Regency – Regency in Southeast Sulawesi, Indonesia
- Wakulla Springs – Spring and cave in the Floridan Aquifer under the Woodville Karst Plain of north Florida
- Walker Bay Whale Sanctuary – Marine conservation area in the Western Cape province in South Africa
- Walter L M Russ – German freighter wrecked in St George's Channel
- Wardang Island – Island in the Spencer Gulf, South Australia
- Washingtonian (1913) – American freighter that sank off Delaware after a collision
- Wast Water – Body of water in Cumbria, England
- TSS Waterford – Passenger vessel built for the Great Western Railway
- Wazee Lake – Artificial lake of Wisconsin, US
- Weh Island – Island in Aceh, Indonesia
- HMNZS Wellington – Leander class frigate sunk as artificial reef off Wellington, New Zealand
- USS Westchester County – US Navy tank landing ship built in 1952
- Western Rocks, Isles of Scilly – Group of rocks in the Isles of Scilly, England, United Kingdom
- SS Wexford – Freighter shipwreck and dive site in lake Huron
- Whitefish Point Underwater Preserve – Reserve to protect and conserve shipwrecks and historical resources in Lake Superior
- Whittle Rock – Granite reef in False Bay, South Africa
- Whittle Rock reef – Granite offshore reef area in False Bay, South Africa
- Whyalla – City in South Australia
- USS Wilkes-Barre – Cleveland-class light cruiser
- SS William B. Davock – Lake freighter sunk in Lake Michigan
- SS William C. Moreland – American lake freighter wrecked on Lake Superior in 1910
- Wolf Rock – Marine pinnacles in Queensland, Australia
- Wondergat – Sinkhole dive site near Lichtenburg, South Africa
- Wreck Alley, San Diego – Recreational dive area with several wrecks sunk as artificial reefs

== Y ==
- USS Yancey – Andromeda-class attack cargo ship sunk as an artificial reef off North Carolina
- YO-257 – US Navy yard oiler scuttled off Waikiki, Honolulu, Hawaii
- Yongala – Australian registered passenger ship that sank off Cape Bowling Green, Queensland, Australia
- HMCS Yukon – Mackenzie-class destroyer of the Royal Canadian Navy

== Z ==
- Zacatón – Water-filled sinkhole in Mexico
- Zenobia – RO-RO ferry that capsized and sank near Larnaca, Cyprus
- Zealandia – Australian cargo and passenger steamship sunk in the bombing of Darwin
- Zingara – Cargo vessel wrecked in the Straits of Tiran in the Red Sea

== See also ==
- Glossary of underwater diving terminology
