= Zingara =

Zingara (pronounced [ˈdziŋɡara]; Italian for "female Gypsy", plural zingare) may refer to:

- "Zingara" (song) (1969), a song by Enrico Riccardi and Luigi Albertelli
- Zingara (film) (1969), a film directed by Mariano Laurenti
- Zingara (ship), an Italian cargo vessel wrecked in 1984
- Zingara (Conan), a nation in the fictional world of Conan the Barbarian
- À la zingara, a garnish in French cuisine
- La zingara (1822), an opera semiseria in two acts by Gaetano Donizetti
- "La zingara" (1845), a song by Giuseppe Verdi

== See also ==
- The Bohemian Girl (1844), an operetta by Michael Balfe
