= J.S. Seaverns =

Shipwreck and dive site in Lake Superior

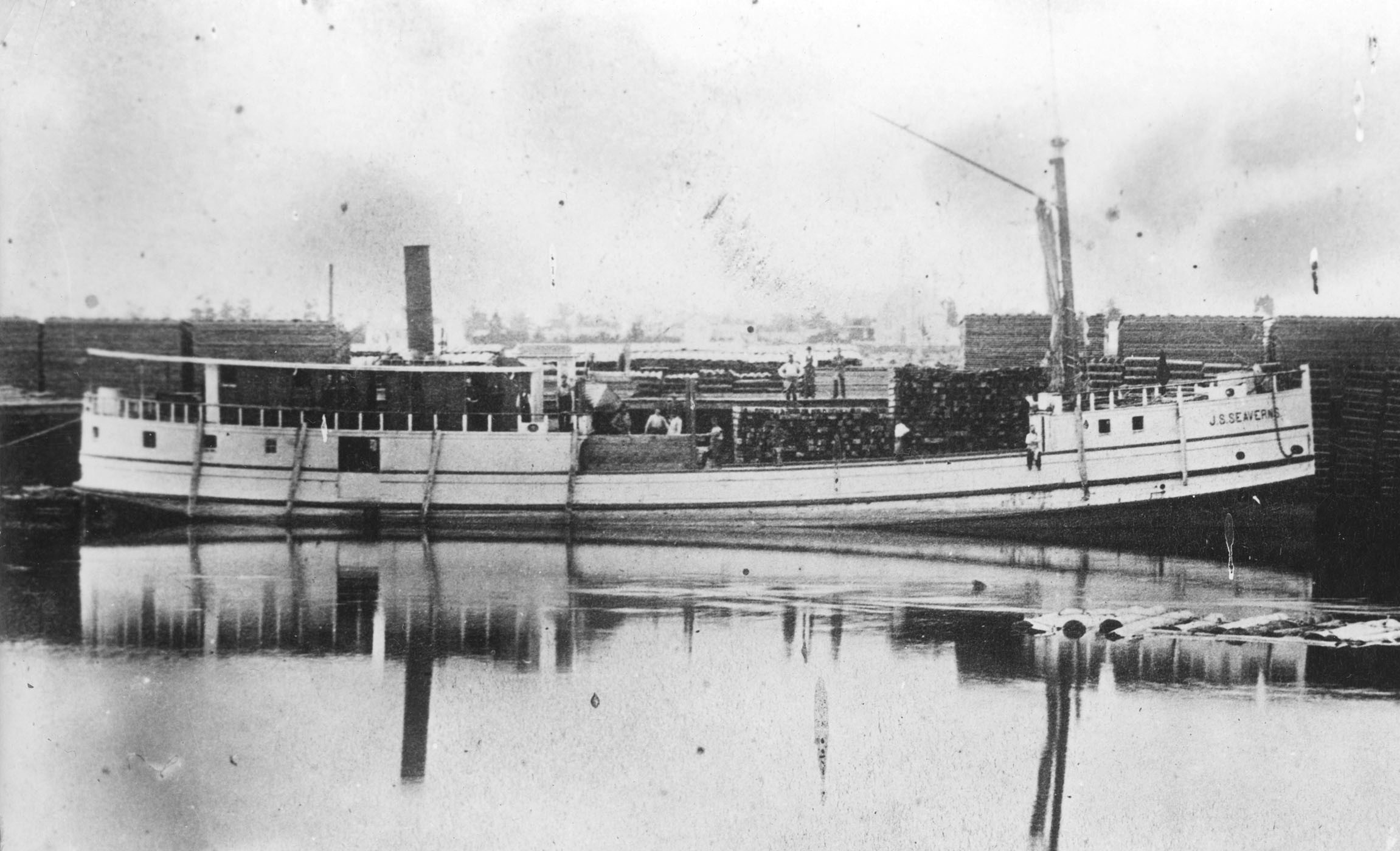
- J.S Seaverns before 1884

History
- Name: J. S. Seaverns
- Builder: James Elliot
- Launched: 1880
- Fate: Sank 10 May 1884
- Notes: Wreck discovered in 2016.

General characteristics
- Length: 130 ft (40 m)
- Crew: 15

The J. S. Seaverns was a cargo ship that was built August, 1880 in Saugatuck, Michigan and sank May 10, 1884 in Lake Superior near Michipicoten, Ontario. Her wreck was discovered 2016 by Dan Fountain at approximately 47.9502778°N 84.877436°W.

The Seaverns sank during calm weather. As she was backing away from the dock, the struck a rock and began taking on water. Because of the calm water, she went down on an even keel. There was no loss of life.

The cold freshwater of Lake Superior helped to preserve the wreck. Its anchors are still on the deck. The wreck is within scuba diving depths.
