= F. T. Barney (schooner) =

American schooner that sank in Lake Huron in 1868

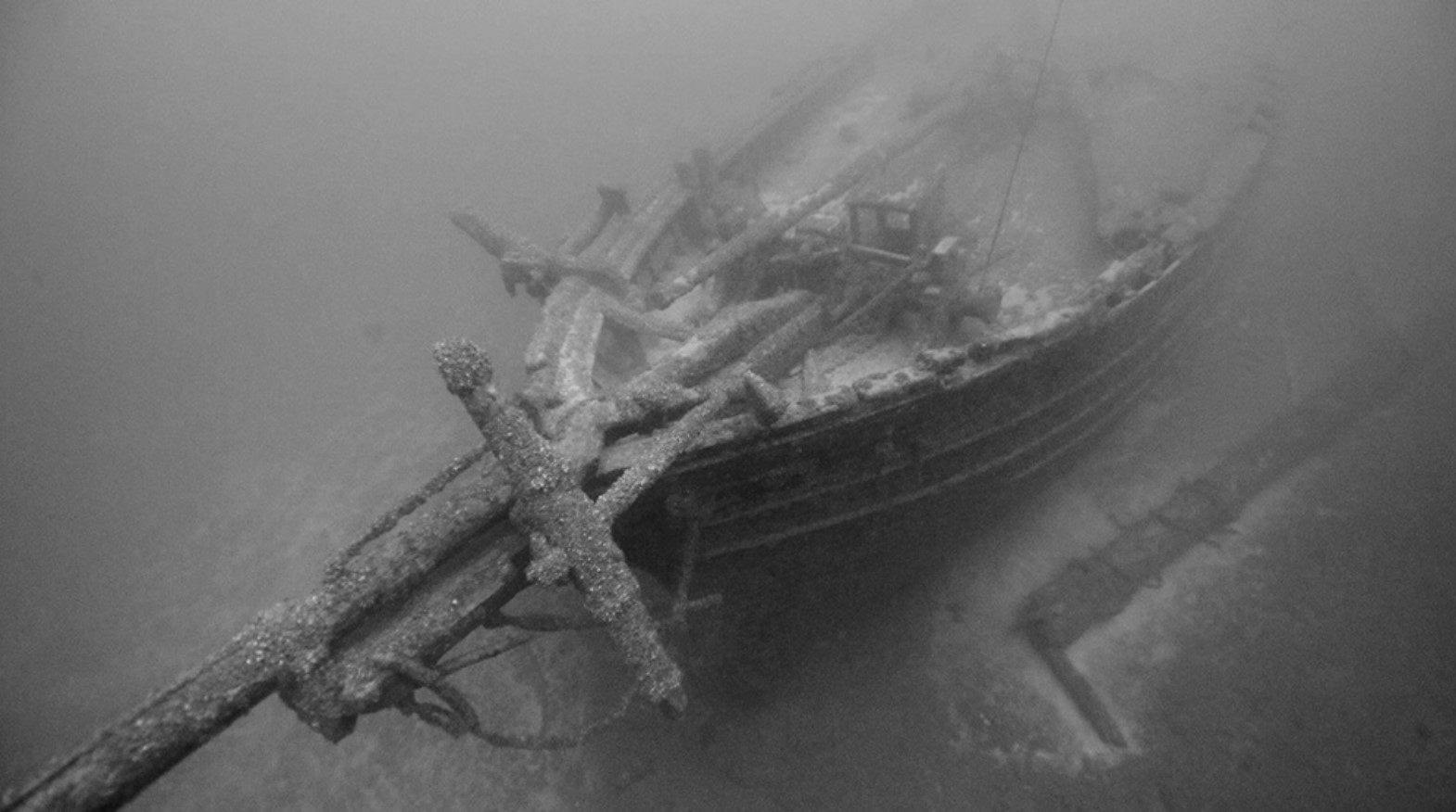

History

United States
- Name: F.T. Barney
- Operator: Lewis Wells
- Builder: W. Cheney
- Completed: 1856
- Out of service: October 23, 1868
- Fate: Wrecked in Lake Huron

General characteristics
- Type: Schooner
- Tonnage: 254 tons
- Length: 126 ft (38 m)
- Beam: 26 ft (7.9 m)
- Depth: 11 ft (3.4 m)
- Notes: Official number 9535
- F.T. Barney Shipwreck
- U.S. National Register of Historic Places
- Location within Michigan Location within the United States
- Location: Lake Huron, near Rogers City, Michigan
- Coordinates: 45°29′9″N 83°50′33″W
- Area: 23 acres (9.3 ha)
- Built: 1855
- Built by: William Cherry
- NRHP reference No.: 91001016
- Added to NRHP: August 19, 1991

F.T. Barney was a 19th-century American schooner that sank in 1868. Her wreck in Lake Huron near Rogers City, Michigan, was listed on the National Register of Historic Places in 1991.

F.T. Barney was built in 1856 by William Cherry of Vermilion, Ohio, and was owned by Lewis Wells, also of Vermillion. In late 1857, she ran aground near Goderich, Ontario, but was successfully towed to Detroit, Michigan, for repairs.

Just after midnight on October 23, 1868, F.T. Barney was traveling from Cleveland to Milwaukee with a load of coal. In Lake Huron near Rogers City, Michigan, the F.T. Barney collided with the schooner T.J. Bronson. F.T. Barney sank in less than two minutes, but there were no deaths. Later investigation determined that both vessels were equally at fault.

The wreck remained undiscovered until 1987. It is in 160 feet (49 meters) of water, and is one of the most complete wrecks of a schooner of its era. The masts and deck equipment are still in place.

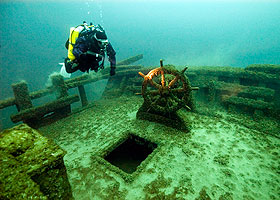
Wreck
