= SS Albert C. Field =

Canadian cargo ship, sunk off the Needles during World War II

History

Canada
- Name: Albert C. Field
- Owner: Eastern Steamship Company (1923–1937); Upper Lakes & St. Lawrence Transportation Co. Ltd. (1937–1944)
- Builder: Furness Shipbuilding Company, Haverton Hill, England
- Yard number: 44
- Launched: 28 May 1923
- Completed: June 1923
- Homeport: St. Catharines, Ontario
- Identification: Official number: 147767
- Fate: Torpedoed and sunk, 18 June 1944

General characteristics
- Tonnage: 1,764 GRT
- Length: 77.1 m (252 ft 11 in)
- Beam: 13.2 m (43 ft 4 in)
- Depth: 5.4 m (17 ft 9 in)
- Propulsion: McColl & Pollock 111 hp (83 kW) 3-cylinder triple expansion steam engine
- Speed: 10 knots (19 km/h; 12 mph)
- Crew: 23

SS Albert C. Field was a Canadian cargo ship, sunk during World War II.

The ship was built by the Furness Shipbuilding Company of Haverton Hill, and launched on 28 May 1923. Her first owner was the Eastern Steamship Company of St. Catharines, Ontario. She was sold to the Upper Lakes & St. Lawrence Transportation Company, also of St. Catharines, in 1937.

The ship was requisitioned by the British government during World War II. On 16 June 1944 Albert C. Field sailed from Penarth as part of Convoy EBC-14 bound for the Normandy beachhead. She was carrying 2,500 tons of munitions and 1,300 bags of mail. On 18 June, when 20 mi (32 km) south-west of The Needles, the convoy was attacked by German aircraft. The ship was hit by a torpedo and sank within three minutes. Four of the crew were killed.

The hull is currently located 34 m (112 ft) below sea level on a gravel seabed at 50°28′24″N 01°45′35″W. The wreckage is badly damaged. The boilers are the highest point at 30 m (98 ft) below. There are several small pieces of exploded ammunition. The machinery is right aft and the bridge is right forward while everything in the middle was cargo space.

In May 2019, the UK Government designated the Albert Field Marine Conservation Zone, which covers approximately 192 km^{2} (74 sq mi) and includes this wreck site.
