= MV Liberty =

Russian cargo ship

History

Russia
- Name: Liberty
- Port of registry: Russia
- Fate: Intentionally sunk south of Cyprus on 22 May 2009

General characteristics
- Class & type: Cargo ship
- Tonnage: 226 GT
- Length: 37 m (121 ft 5 in)
- Beam: 7 m (23 ft 0 in)

MV Liberty was a Russian cargo ship which was turned into an artificial reef south of Cyprus in 2009. The ship had a gross tonnage of 225 GT, a length of 37 metres (121 ft), and a beam of 7 metres (23 ft).

== Shipwreck ==
On 22 May 2009, Liberty was intentionally sunk by the Paralimni Municipality of Cyprus off the southern coast of the island. The vessel was previously intended to be scrapped, but was instead turned into an artificial reef in order to promote diving tourism to the island. The dive site, known as the Liberty Wreck, was the first part of the Liberty Reef Artificial Project funded by the Cyprus Dive Center Association.

The dive site is located approximately 1 kilometre (0.62 mi) from land, and the shipwreck sits between 22 and 27 metres (72 and 89 ft) below the water. The ship has two entrances through openings on the deck and an exit through the cargo loading hatch. The ship was stripped down to the hull and had the bridge removed before it was sunk. After the reef was established, the area was closed to all boat traffic in an effort to draw marine life to the wreck, and the shipwreck was made a marine fish reserve for the region.
