= SS City of Launceston =

Steamship operated by the Launceston and Melbourne Steam Navigation Company

Coordinates: 38°4′42″S 144°49′30″E

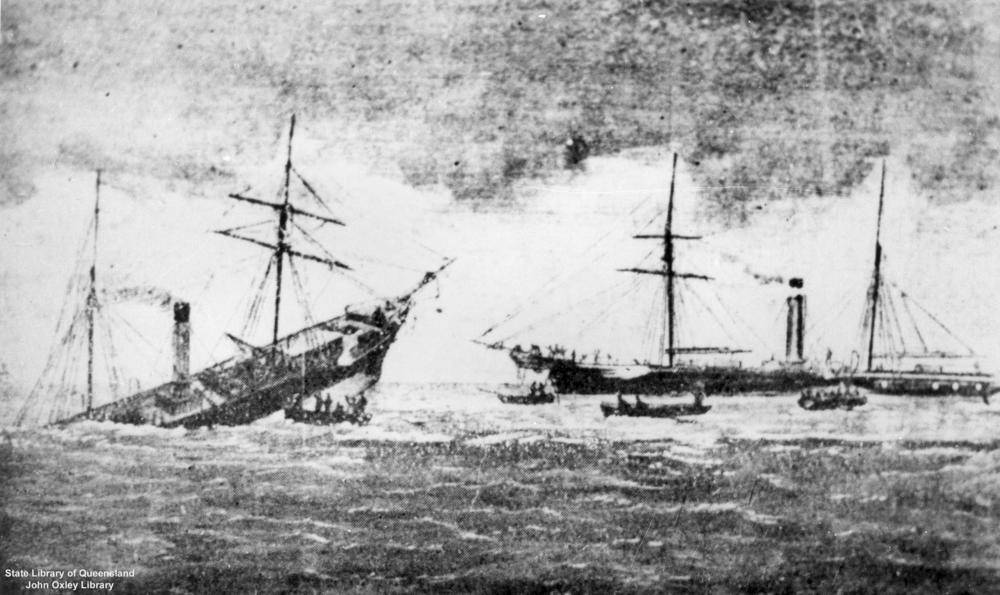
- Artist's impression of the City of Launceston sinking

History

Australia
- Name: City of Launceston
- Namesake: Launceston, Tasmania
- Owner: Launceston & Melbourne Steamship Company
- Port of registry: Launceston, Tasmania
- Builder: Blackwood & Gordon, Paisley
- Cost: £17,000
- Yard number: 55
- Launched: 4 April 1863
- In service: October 1863
- Identification: official number: 32240
- Fate: Sank after collision, 19 November 1865

General characteristics
- Type: cargo and passenger ship
- Tonnage: 368 GRT; 277 NRT
- Length: 177 ft 2 in (54.00 m)
- Beam: 24 ft 5 in (7.44 m)
- Depth: 11 ft 8 in (3.56 m)
- Propulsion: 2 cylinder 80 hp (60 kW) steam engine, Single screw
- Sail plan: Schooner-rigged on two masts
- Capacity: 188 passengers

SS City of Launceston was a 368 GRT steamship operated by the Launceston and Melbourne Steam Navigation Company from 1863, which had an early role in colonial steam shipping as the forerunner of the modern Bass Strait ferry service between Tasmania and Victoria. It was sunk in Port Phillip Bay after a collision with another ship on 19 November 1865.

== Ship history ==
The iron-hulled ship was built at the yard of Blackwood & Gordon in Paisley, Scotland, for the Launceston & Melbourne Steamship Company, at a cost of £17,000, and launched on 4 April 1863. At 368 gross register tons (GRT) and 177 ft (54 m) long she was built to carry passengers and cargo, and was powered by an 80 nhp steam engine as well as sails on two masts.

The ship sailed from Glasgow on 6 June 1863, bound for Melbourne, arriving there on 16 September. Once at Melbourne, while undergoing an overhaul preparatory to her first commercial voyage, she was altered from a brig to a schooner rig. As the flagship of the Launceston and Melbourne Steam Navigation Company, no expense was spared in her fitting-out.

On 21 October 1863 the ship made a trial voyage from Launceston to George Town, with between 450 and 500 invited passengers aboard, who were lavishly entertained with free wines and refreshments, and music provided by the Volunteer Artillery brass band. The ship left launceston at 7.30 a.m. and made the crossing in 2¾ hours. At George Town the passengers went ashore to stroll around the town and on the beach, and were provided with sumptuous lunch before the ship set sail again at 3.30 p.m., arriving back at launceston by 6.00 p.m.

For the following two years she carried passengers, mail and cargo across the Strait, without incident.

=== Sinking ===
At 7.20 p.m. on 19 November 1865 the City of Launceston sailed from Port Melbourne under the command of Captain William Thompson. She carried a crew of 23, and 25 passengers, and a general cargo that included mail, luggage, drapery, brandy, port, rum, cigars, tea, boots, and sheepwash. The evening was bright and cloudless, the seas calm.

The City of Launceston observed the SS Penola, inbound from Adelaide, approaching head on while they were still five miles apart. According to the rules of the sea ships on converging courses were supposed to port their helm in order to pass each other safely. However, this did not happen and the two ships closed, and at around 9.00 p.m. Penola ran her bows squarely into City of Launceston's starboard side. As the Launceston began to sink all of the passengers and crew were transferred to the Penola, which despite leaving her stem lodged in the hull of the Launceston was able to make port safely.

=== Wreck site ===
A week or so after the collision divers recovered 56 mailboxes, one bag, one parcel, five passengers' boxes, and two cases of merchandise from the wreck. An attempt was made to refloat the ship the following year, using "Maquay's patented lifting device", where canvas bags inflated by hydrogen gas produced by the reaction of zinc and sulphuric acid were attached to the ship. It was not successful.

City of Launceston was rediscovered in 1980 by members of the Maritime Archaeology Association of Victoria, and became the first wreck to be listed and protected under the Historic Shipwrecks Act of 1981. The wreck sits upright in 21 metres (69 ft) of water and is largely intact. Since 1997 she has been the subject of archaeological studies under the direction of Heritage Victoria's Maritime Heritage Unit.
