= Protea banks =

Reef about 7 km off the south coast of KwaZulu-Natal, South Africa

Coordinates: 30°52′37″S 30°27′31″E

Ecology
- Realm: Eastern India coast
- Biome: Coral reef
- Animals: tuna, zambezi sharks, etc.

Geography
- Oceans or seas: Indian Ocean

Protea banks is a reef about 7 km off the shore of South Africa near Margate. The reef is a submerged shoal approximately 6 km long and 800 meters wide, with an average depth of around 30 meters.

== Inhabitants ==
The reef is home to many predators, such as the Zambezi sharks. The large tuna population has created a prosperous fishing ground. Other fish species include scalloped hammerheads, great hammerheads, bull sharks, tiger sharks and Barracudas. Other pelagic fish include kingfish, yellowtail, kaakap, sea pike, tuna and potato bass. Locals are expecting the Protea banks to bring new economic opportunities, with an expected boom in tourism to the area.

== Activities ==
The main attraction of this area is scuba diving, owing to large numbers of sharks. Just past Sand Shark Valley, divers sometimes encounter Giant Guitar Sharks, as well as Ragged-Tooth Sharks. Described as friendly and inquisitive, the Ragged-Tooth shark is a favorite among divers.

== Geography ==
The Northern Pinnacle is known for its magnificent topography and is a preferred diving destination in the winter months. The reef has two caves used by ragged-tooth sharks on their annual migration and congregation route. During spring and summer, large schools of Hammerheads can be seen there. The best times to dive the Northern Pinnacle is between May and November.

The Southern Pinnacle is home to the Zambezi shark, which is best observed between October and May. In March–April, scalloped hammerheads may be seen in this area. One of the most popular spots to start a diving trip is the Southern Cave, which is home to large populations of reel fish. The overhanging rock known as Kingfish Gully is known for its large shoals of pelagic fish. The Sand Shark Gully, home of the Giant Guitar Shark, lies at 40 m depth.

== Sardine Run ==
The Protea Banks is a popular destination among tourists wishing to observe the annual great Sardine Run during the months of June and July. Massive sardine schools migrate from colder waters around the Cape of Good Hope to the warmer waters of Kwa-zulu Natal. The sardine run usually starts north of Port Elizabeth and moves north along the coast. As the dates of the run are difficult to predict, it is a matter of luck for divers to be able to witness the Sardine Run.
