= SS Ajax (1923) =

Cargo steamship that was built in Germany in 1923

Coordinates: 50°30′N 01°40′W

History
- Name: 1923 Elbe; 1927: Ceuta; 1927: Ajax
- Namesake: 1923: Elbe; 1927: Ceuta; 1927: Ajax
- Owner: 1923: Kirsten Adolf & Co; 1924: Rochling, Menzell & Co; 1927: Oldenburg.-Portug. D/s-R.; 1927: Koninkl. Nederl. Stoomb. Maats.
- Operator: As owner except: 1927: Schultze & Burmester, Hamburg
- Port of registry: 1923: (Weimar Republic) Hamburg; 1927: (Netherlands) Amsterdam
- Builder: Hamburger Elbe Schiffswerft AG
- Yard number: 5
- Completed: April 1923
- Identification: code letters NBTJ (1927–33); call sign PCFQ (1934–40)
- Fate: Sunk by air attack, 8 August 1940

General characteristics
- Type: Cargo ship
- Tonnage: 942 GRT, 510 NRT
- Length: 221.1 ft (67.4 m)
- Beam: 34.5 ft (10.5 m)
- Depth: 13.4 ft (4.1 m)
- Decks: 1
- Installed power: 126 NHP
- Propulsion: triple-expansion steam engine
- Speed: 10.5 knots (19 km/h)

SS Ajax was a cargo steamship that was built in Germany in 1923 as Elbe. In 1927 she was renamed twice, first to Ceuta and then to Ajax.

A series of German shipping companies owned the ship until 1927, when a Dutch company bought her. A Luftwaffe air raid sank her in the English Channel in 1940. Her wreck off the Isle of Wight is now a destination for wreck diving.

== Building ==
The Hamburger Elbe Schiffswerft built Elbe in Hamburg for Kirsten Adolf & Co. Her registered length was 221.1 ft (67.4 m), her beam was 34.5 ft (10.5 m) and her depth was 13.4 ft (4.1 m). Her tonnages were 942 GRT and 510 NRT.

Gute Hoffnungshütte of Oberhausen built her three-cylinder triple-expansion steam engine, which was rated at 126 NHP and gave her a speed of 10.5 knots (19 km/h).

== Peacetime career ==
Kirsten Adolf & Co registered Elbe in Hamburg. In 1924 Rochling, Menzell & Co bought her. In 1927 the Oldenburg-Portugiesische Dampfschiffs-Rhederei (OPDR) bought Elbe and renamed her Ceuta. Later in 1927, OPDR sold Ceuta to the Koninklijke Nederlandse Stoomboot-Maatschappij (KNSM), which renamed her Ajax and registered her in Amsterdam.

Under KNSM ownership Ajax had the Dutch code letters NBTJ until 1933−34, when they were superseded by the call sign PCFQ.

== Second World War ==
On 10 May 1940 Germany invaded the Netherlands. On 31 July Ajax left Falmouth, Cornwall in Convoy CE 8, which reached the Thames Estuary off Southend on 5 August. On 7 August Ajax left Southend with Convoy CW 9 to head west down the English Channel. CW 9 was code named Peewit. It comprised 26 cargo ships with no naval escort.

German Freya radar detected CW 9 as it passed through the Strait of Dover. Four E-boats attacked the convoy, sinking four ships. As CW 9 passed south of St Catherine's Point on the Isle of Wight, Junkers Ju 87 dive bombers and Messerschmitt Bf 109 fighter aircraft attacked. RAF Fighter Command counter-attacked, but at 0910 hrs two Ju 87s and a Bf 109 hit the forward part of Ajax with three bombs. She sank within five minutes, and four members of her crew were killed.

Ajax's wreck lies on its port side on white sand at a depth of about 40 m (130 ft). Her stern is broken up but her bow, boilers, engine and helm can all be identified. Her wreck is now a recreational dive site.

== Bibliography ==
- Saunders, Andy (2010). Convoy Peewit: August 8, 1940: the First Day of the Battle of Britain?. London: Grub Street. ISBN 978-1906502676.
