= TSS Waterford =

Passenger vessel built for the Great Western Railway

Coordinates: 9.819562°N 122.365294°E

History
- Name: 1912–1924: TSS Waterford; 1924–1941: SS Panay
- Operator: 1912–1924: Great Western Railway; 1924–1941: Fernández Hermanos, Cia Maritima, Manila
- Port of registry: (United Kingdom)
- Route: Fishguard - Waterford
- Builder: Swan Hunter and Wigham Richardson Limited, Neptune Yard
- Yard number: 880
- Launched: 20 February 1912
- Completed: April 1912
- Fate: Sunk March 1942 by Japanese aircraft at Campomanes Bay, Negros

General characteristics
- Type: Ferry
- Tonnage: 1,204 gross register tons (GRT)
- Length: 275.2 ft (83.9 m)
- Beam: 38.2 ft (11.6 m)
- Draught: 16.5 ft (5.0 m)
- Propulsion: Quadruple expansion engines

Location of the wreck of the Panay

TSS Waterford was a passenger vessel built for the Great Western Railway in 1912. The ship was sold in 1924 and became the Philippine merchant ship Panay which was sunk by Japanese aircraft in 1942.

== Design ==
The ship was 83.9 meters (275 ft 3 in) long and had a beam of 11.6 meters (38 ft 1 in). She was assessed at 1,204 GRT and had 2 x 3 cyl Quadruple expansion engines driving two screw propellers. The ship achieve a speed of 10 knots.

== History ==
She was built by Swan, Hunter & Wigham Richardson Limited in Neptune Yard, Low Walker on the River Tyne for the Great Western Railway. She was launched on 20 February 1912, and later that year started work on the Fishguard to Waterford service.

In 1924 she was sold to Fernández Hermanos, Cia Maritime, Manila and renamed Panay.

Panay, being used after the Japanese landings in the Philippines to transport arms and ammunition from Luzon to the west coast of Negros, was sunk by Japanese aircraft at Campomanes Bay in March 1942. Arms and ammunition were salvaged by divers in order to arm the guerilla forces forming on the island. The wreck is now a dive site attraction near the city of Sipalay.
