= Grace A. Channon (shipwreck) =

Three masted schooner built in Michigan

History
- Name: Grace A. Channon
- Owner: Henry Channon and Henry Graham
- Builder: W. S. Ellinwood & Co.
- Yard number: 85309
- Completed: 1873
- Out of service: 1877
- Home port: Detroit
- Fate: Sank 2 August 1877 after a collision with the schooner Favorite.

General characteristics
- Type: Canal schooner
- Tonnage: 265.99
- Length: 140.7 ft (42.9 m)
- Beam: 26 ft (7.9 m)
- Depth of hold: 11.6 ft (3.5 m)

Grace A. Channon was a three-masted schooner built in E. Saginaw, Michigan by W.S. Ellinwood and Co. She was known as a "canaller" because she could transit the Welland Canal. She was named after the 10-year-old daughter of Henry Channon, one of the owners. Her cargo consisted usually of coal, wheat, and on occasion corn, lumber, and rod iron.

On 2 August 1877, the Grace A. Channon was sailing to Chicago, Illinois when the steam barge Favorite smashed into her port side. Within 5 minutes, the Grace A. Channon sank. Co-owner Henry Graham was a passenger aboard the ship along with his two sons, nine-year-old Harry and seven-year-old Alexander. He had them by his side just before the crash. Henry and Harry threw themselves overboard and were saved by the vessel's yawl boat, but seven-year-old Alexander Graham became separated from his father and was sucked into the cabin by the rush of water before he could be rescued, and went down with the ship. Only one crewman was rescued from the water by the Favorite.

The wreck of the Grace A. Channon was located in April 1985 by Kent Belrichard, William Kappelman and John Trumbo, and now sits, on an even keel, in 205 feet of water. The ships wheel, compass and port light are on display at the North Point Lighthouse in Milwaukee. The wreck is located at 42°55.77′N 087°36.12′W.
