= Circle of Heroes =

Underwater military memorial in Florida

- Location within Florida Location within the United States
- Location: Florida, USA
- Waterbody: Veterans Memorial Reef
- Nearest land: Caladesi Island State Park
- Coordinates: 28.0264°N 82.9133°W
- Dive type: Open-water
- Depth range: 36 to 40 ft (11 to 12 m)
- Average visibility: 31 to 35 ft (9.4 to 10.7 m)
- Entry type: Boat
- Bottom composition: Sand
- Water: Salt

The Circle of Heroes is an underwater military veterans memorial 10 miles off the coast of Honeymoon Island State Park in the Gulf of Mexico. It is the first underwater veterans memorial.

== The memorial ==
The statues were installed during the week of July 22, 2019 after 2-1/2 years of planning and creation. They were dedicated on August 5, 2019, and currently consist of thirteen 6-foot tall statues placed 40 feet underwater, with plans to add twelve more statues. At the center, stands a 4 foot high, 3-ton pentagon shaped monument featuring the emblems of the five military branches: Air Force, Army, Coast Guard, Marine Corps and Navy. The statues are arranged in a 100 foot circle around the center monument. The memorial is also considered a recreational dive site.

Each statue weighs 1,200 pounds.

== Statues ==
The statues depict:

- Navy Sailor
- Southeast Asia War Soldier
- Korean War Soldier
- Marine in Dress Blues
- Vietnam Soldier
- Air Force Pilot
- No Man Left Behind
- Gulf War Soldier
- Iraq War Soldier
- Iraq Freedom Fighter
- Army Nurse
- Soldier Kneeling & Battle Cross
- Coast Guard Sailor
