= SS Maine =

British ship sunk in 1917 near Dartmouth, Devon. Now a recreational dive site

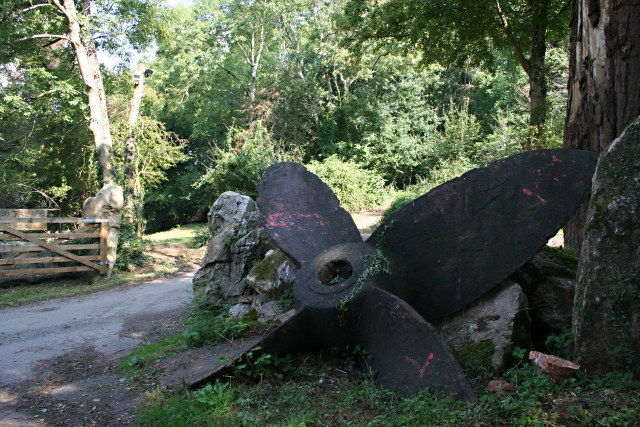
- The propeller from Maine at Kingsteignton, Devon.

History
- Name: Sierra Blanca (1904–13); Maine (1913–17)
- Owner: Sierra Shipping Co. Ltd (1904–13); Atlantic Transport Co. Ltd (1913–17)
- Operator: Thomas, Anderson & Co. (1905–13); Atlantic Transport Co. Ltd (1913–17)
- Port of registry: (United Kingdom of Great Britain and Ireland) Liverpool, United Kingdom
- Launched: 19 November 1904
- Completed: January 1904
- Out of service: 23 March 1917
- Fate: Torpedoed and sunk

General characteristics
- Type: Steamship
- Tonnage: 3,616 GRT, 2,338 NRT
- Length: 361 feet (110.03 m)
- Beam: 46 feet 2 inches (14.07 m)
- Installed power: Triple expansion steam engine
- Propulsion: Single screw propeller
- Speed: 13 knots (24 km/h)

Maine was a British steamship launched in 1904 as Sierra Blanca for the Sierra Shipping Co. Ltd. She was sold to the Atlantic Transport Co. Ltd. in 1913 and renamed Maine. She was torpedoed and sunk in March 1917 by UC-17.

== Description ==
The ship was 361 feet (110.03 m) long, with a beam of 46 feet 2 inches (14.07 m). She was powered by a triple expansion steam engine which drove a single screw propeller. It could propel her at 13 knots (24 km/h).

== History ==
Sierra Blanca was built by D. & W. Henderson & Co., Glasgow for the Sierra Shipping Co. Ltd. She was launched on 19 November 1904 and completed in January 1905. Her port of registry was Liverpool and she was operated under the management of Thomson, Anderson & Co. Her maiden voyage was to Mobile, Alabama, United States, at which port she arrived on 26 January 1905. On 26 July 1908, Sierra Blanca ran aground on the South Lyconia Reef. She was refloated after jettisoning 300 tons of cargo and put in to Manila, Philippines in a severely damaged condition on 31 July.

In 1913, Sierra Blanca was sold to the Atlantic Transport Co. Ltd. and was renamed Maine. On 23 March 1917, Maine was torpedoed and sunk in the English Channel 9.5 nautical miles (17.6 km) off Berry Head, Devon (50°12′N 3°52′W) by UC-17. Maine was on a voyage from London to Philadelphia, Pennsylvania, United States. There were no casualties. She was carrying chalk and general cargo. She sank "gracefully, upright and on an even keel" and sits on shingle 36 metres (118 ft) deep at 50°12.750′N 3°50.955′W.

The Torbay British Sub-Aqua Club bought the wreck for £100 in 1962 and salvaged the bronze propeller, selling it for £800.

The propeller was proudly displayed on a plinth outside the Safeway supermarket in Paignton town centre, until the redevelopment of the site in the early 2000s. The propeller was being sold for scrap, but was rescued by a farmer and now is in a field in Kingsteignton.
