= Palmwood shipwreck =

17th century shipwreck in the Netherlands

Coordinates: 53.054°N 4.938°E

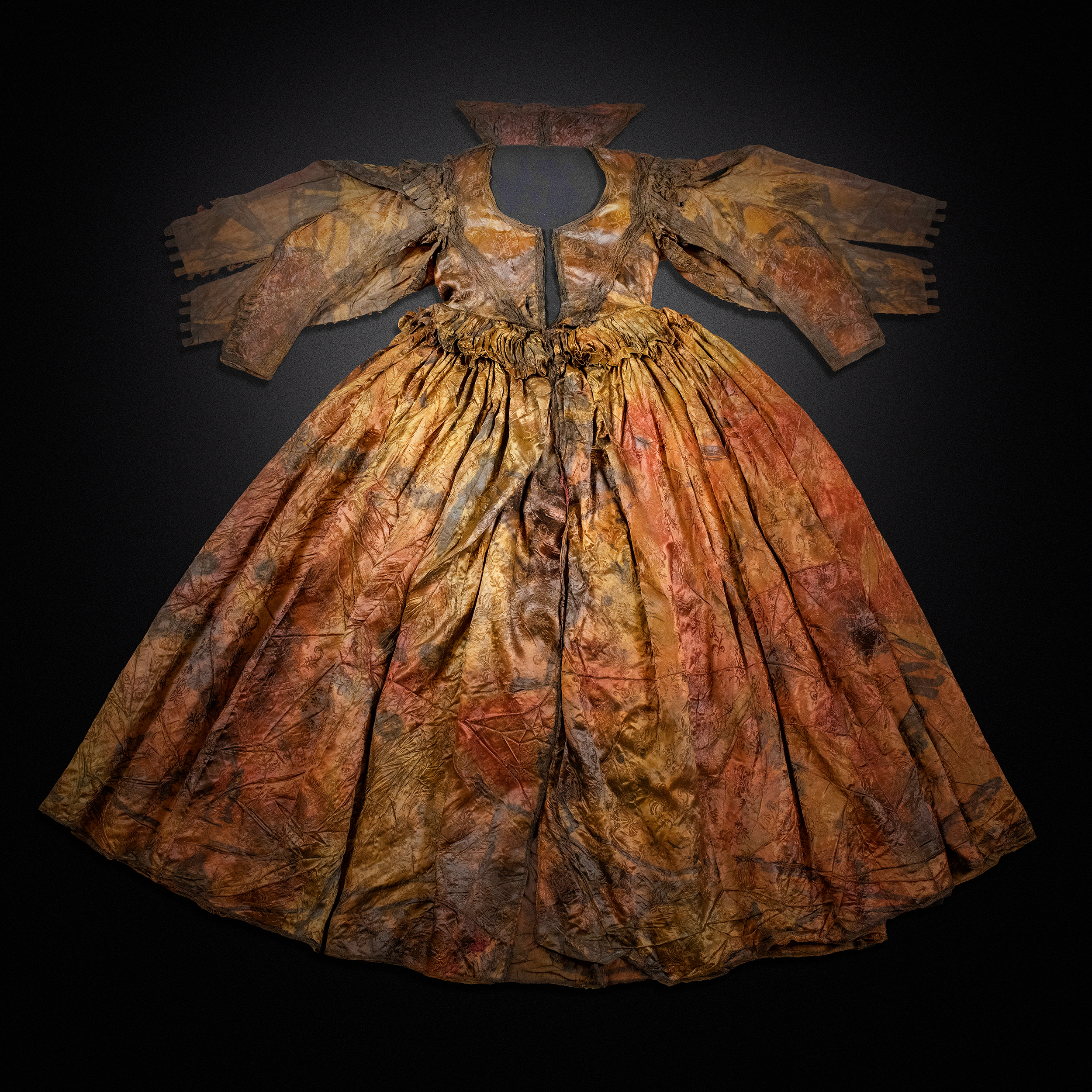
The silk dress from the Palmwood wreck

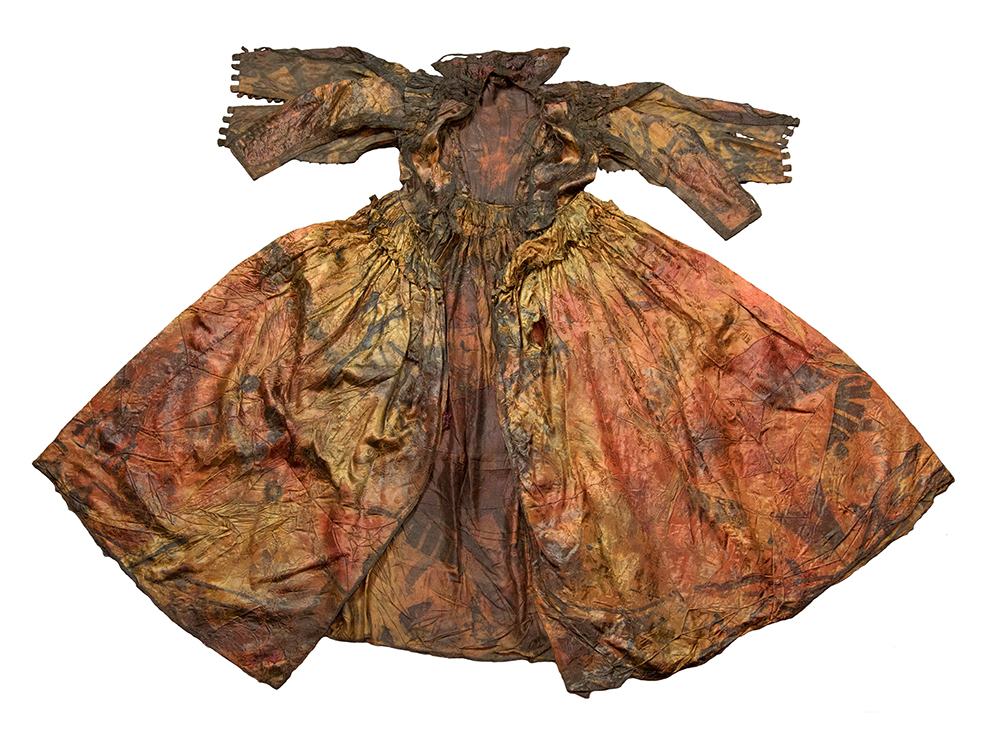
Another view of the silk dress

The Palmwood is the name used for a shipwreck off the coast of the Dutch island of Texel in the Wadden Sea.

Artifacts recovered from the wreck include two unique examples of 17th-century clothing, one a satin silk damask dress such as would have been worn by the very wealthy for everyday occasions and the other a silk and silver wedding dress. Both dresses, along with other artifacts found in the wreck, are on display at the Kaap Skil museum in Texel.

== Ship and voyage ==
The ship, whose name is unknown, is believed to have voyaged in the 17th century, around 1650 or 1660. It sank off the eastern coast of Texel sometime after 1636.

It has been proposed the ship is one of a fleet of twelve which was lost on a crossing from Dover to Hellevoetsluis in 1642 and may have been part of the ostensible transport of a royal bride to join her new husband in the Netherlands but camouflaging a diplomatic mission. The Kaap Skil museum, however, which houses the artifacts, believes the ship was likely a Dutch merchant vessel.

== Discovery ==
The shipwreck was discovered by Dutch divers, members of a local amateur dive club, in 2009, and more artifacts were recovered from it in 2014. The wreck site is called Burgzand Noord 17. The ship itself, whose name is unknown, has variously been called the palmwood ship and the boxwood ship because of unusual woods found in the remains.

The wreck is at a depth which provides an environment that inhibits the decomposition of animal and insect matter such as leather and silk. Plant matter materials such as book pages and cotton garments decompose.

== Artifacts ==
Among the artifacts recovered in 2014 are two dresses believed to have been made around 1620 and to have been about 30 years old at the time of the shipwreck. They were found in a chest packed together, along with other items such as stockings, a bodice, a velvet robe, and a toiletry set. One of the dresses is satin silk damask and the other, the so-called silver dress, is silk interwoven with strands of silver and believed to be a wedding dress.

The silk dress is largely intact and is "unique" as a remaining artifact of 17th-century clothing textiles, according to textile restorer Emmy de Groot. It consists of a bodice, full skirt with pleats, and sleeves with ruffles. It is typical of dresses of the 1620s to 1630s in Western Europe and is believed to be an everyday dress.

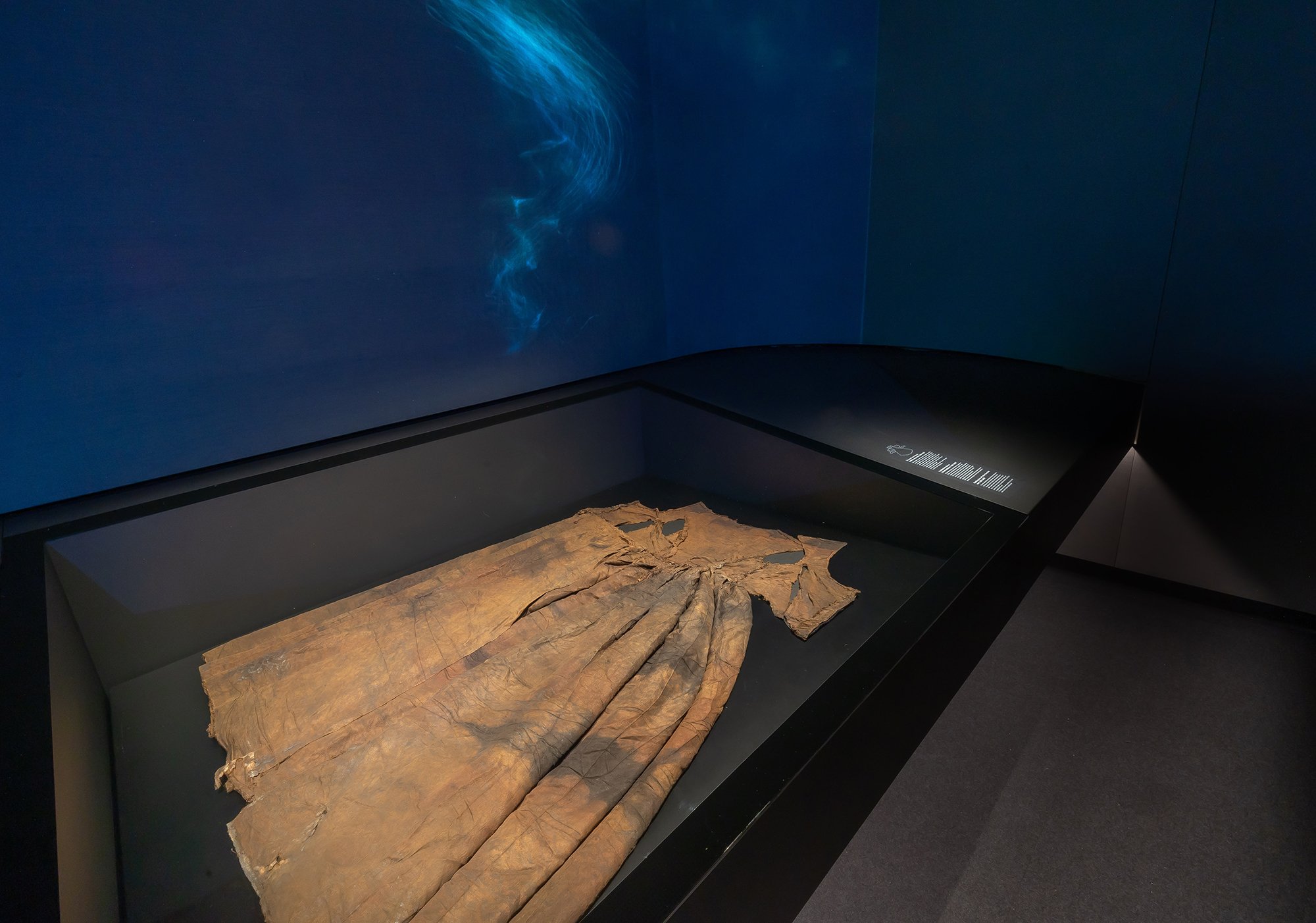
The silver dress in its display case

The silver dress is also a "unique" example, according to Maarten van Bommell of the University of Amsterdam; according to van Bommell the two dresses may represent the only "two such dresses in the whole world". The silver dress was in approximately ten fragments but eventually pieced together. The silver dress in particular would have been extremely expensive at the time of its making and so is believed to have been likely created for a member of the nobility or of a wealthy merchant family. A book cover found with other artifacts is embossed with the coat-of-arms of Charles I, which supports the theory the owner was a member of nobility, perhaps of the House of Stuart.

In 2016 Nadine Akkerman and another Dutch historian proposed that the owner of the dresses was Jean Kerr, Countess of Roxburghe, who was a lady-in-waiting to Henrietta Maria, Charles I's Queen., although this suggestion was withdrawn as soon as further information about the site of the wreck was released.

According to Archeology, the artifacts recovered by 2018 include a "stunning collection of silk garments and velvet textiles, leather book covers, and pottery [representing] the richest cargo of seventeenth-century luxury goods ever found underwater." Artifacts include items associated with the Mediterranean and Indian subcontinent. Because many of the artifacts were recovered boxed together, the find also represents an unusual opportunity to study the possessions of a contemporary collection of objects perhaps owned by a single person or family unit.

== Exhibits and media coverage ==
The artifacts recovered have been on display at the Kaap Skil museum in oxygen-free display cases since November 2022 and are the subject of a podcast, The Dress and the Shipwreck, and a documentary planned in 2023.
