= Bullhead Point Historical and Archaeological District =

Historic district in Wisconsin, United States

- U.S. National Register of Historic Places
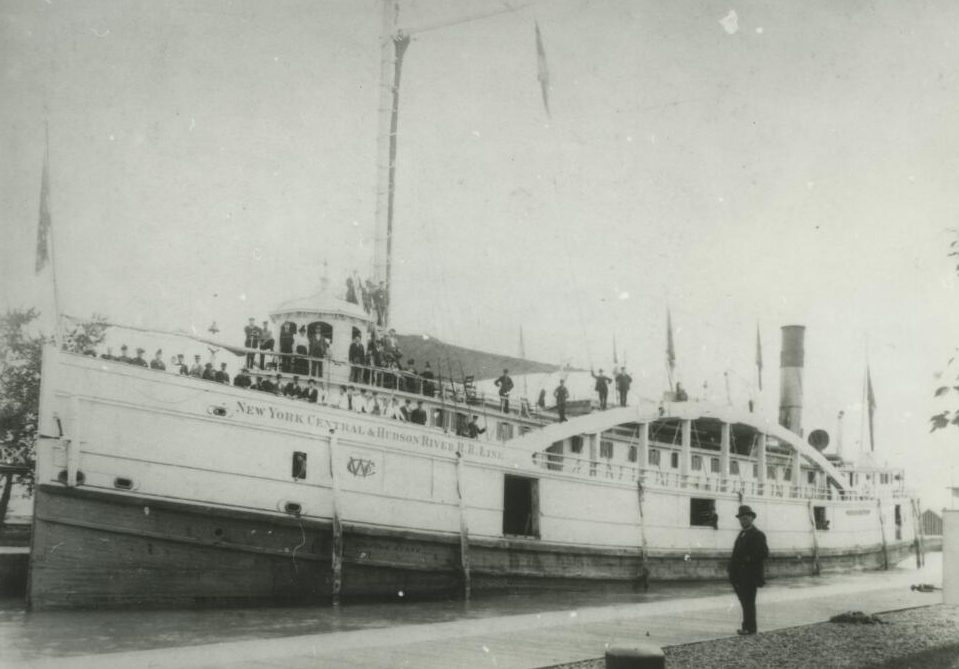
- The vessel Empire State.
- Location: N. Duluth Ave., Sturgeon Bay, Wisconsin
- Coordinates: 44°50′37″N 87°23′43″W
- Area: less than one acre
- MPS: Great Lakes Shipwreck Sites of Wisconsin MPS
- NRHP reference No.: 03000167
- Added to NRHP: March 26, 2003

The Bullhead Point Historical and Archaeological District is a historic district in Sturgeon Bay, Wisconsin.

== Description ==
The district includes the remains of three ships in shallow water. They are visible from the shore during periods of lower lake levels. All hauled limestone for the Sturgeon Bay Stone Company at the ends of their lives and were burned in 1931. They are the 212-foot steamer Empire State built in 1862, the 134-foot centerboard schooner Oak Leaf, and the 168-foot schooner-barge Ida Corning.
