= Jutten Island Marine Protected Area =

Marine conservation area in Saldanha Bay in South Africa

- IUCN category IV (habitat/species management area)
- Jutten Island MPA location
- Location: Near Saldanha Bay, South Africa
- Nearest city: Saldanha, Western Cape
- Coordinates: 33°05.006′S 17°57.411′E
- Area: 1.11 km^{2} (0.43 sq mi)
- Established: 2000
- Governing body: SANParks
- Jutten Island Marine Protected Area (South Africa)

The Jutten Island Marine Protected Area is an inshore conservation region in the territorial waters of South Africa in Saldanha Bay, in the Western Cape.

== History ==
The MPA was proclaimed by the Minister of Environmental Affairs and Tourism, Mohammed Valli Moosa, in Government Gazette No. 21948 of 29 December 2000 in terms of section 43 of the Marine Living Resources Act, 18 of 1998.

== Purpose ==
A marine protected area is defined by the IUCN as "A clearly defined geographical space, recognised, dedicated and managed, through legal or other effective means, to achieve the long-term conservation of nature with associated ecosystem services and cultural values".

== Extent ==
Jutten Island MPA is part of the West Coast National Park. The MPA is at the southern entrance to Saldanha Bay, 800 m from Jut Point. The area of the island is 46 ha and it is fairly flat with two small hills. The highest point is 60 m above sea level. The total area of the MPA is 1.11 km^{2}

=== Boundaries ===
The MPA is below the high water mark within the boundaries:

- Northern boundary: S33°04.706′, E017°56.961′ to S33°04.706′, E017°57.861′
- Eastern boundary: S33°04.706′, E017°57.861′ to S33°05.306′, E017°57.861′
- Southern boundary: S33°05.306′, E017°57.861′ to S33°05.306′, E017°56.961′
- Western boundary: S33°05.306′, E017°56.961′ to S33°04.706′, E017°56.961′

== Management ==
The marine protected areas of South Africa are the responsibility of the national government, which has management agreements with a variety of MPA management authorities, in this case, SANParks, which manages the MPA with funding from the SA Government through the Department of Environmental Affairs (DEA).

The Department of Agriculture, Forestry and Fisheries is responsible for issuing permits, quotas and law enforcement.

== Geography ==
=== Climate ===
The climate of the South-western Cape is markedly different from the rest of South Africa, which is a summer rainfall region, receiving most of its rainfall during the summer months of December to February. The South-western Cape has a Mediterranean type climate, with most of its rainfall during the winter months from June to September.

During the summer the dominant factor determining the weather in the region is a high pressure zone, known as the South Atlantic High, located over the South Atlantic ocean to the west of the Cape coast. Winds circulating in an anticlockwise direction from such a system reach the Cape from the south-east, producing periods of up to several days of high winds and mostly clear skies. These winds keep the region relatively cool. Because of its south facing aspect Betty's Bay is exposed to these winds.

Winter in the South-western Cape is characterised by disturbances in the circumpolar westerly winds, resulting in a series of eastward moving depressions. These bring cool cloudy weather and rain from the north west. The south westerly winds over the South Atlantic produce the prevailing south-westerly swell typical of the winter months, which beat on the exposed coastline.

== Ecology ==
Marine ecoregions of the South African Exclusive Economic Zone: Jutten Island Marine Protected Area is in the Benguela ecoregion

The MPA is in the cool temperate Benguela ecoregion to the west of Cape Point which extends northwards to the Orange River. There are a large proportion of species endemic to South Africa along this coastline.

Four major habitats exist in the sea in this region, distinguished by the nature of the substrate. The substrate, or base material, is important in that it provides a base to which an organism can anchor itself, which is vitally important for those organisms which need to stay in one particular kind of place. Rocky shores and reefs provide a firm fixed substrate for the attachment of plants and animals. Some of these may have Kelp forests, which reduce the effect of waves and provide food and shelter for an extended range of organisms. Sandy beaches and bottoms are a relatively unstable substrate and cannot anchor kelp or many of the other benthic organisms. Finally there is open water, above the substrate and clear of the kelp forest, where the organisms must drift or swim. Mixed habitats are also frequently found, which are a combination of those mentioned above. There are no significant estuarine habitats in the MPA.

Rocky shores and reefs There are rocky reefs and mixed rocky and sandy bottoms. For many marine organisms the substrate is another type of marine organism, and it is common for several layers to co-exist. Examples of this are red bait pods, which are usually encrusted with sponges, ascidians, bryozoans, anemones, and gastropods, and abalone, which are usually covered by similar seaweeds to those found on the surrounding rocks, usually with a variety of other organisms living on the seaweeds.

The type of rock of the reef is of some importance, as it influences the range of possibilities for the local topography, which in turn influences the range of habitats provided, and therefore the diversity of inhabitants. Sandstone and other sedimentary rocks erode and weather very differently, and depending on the direction of dip and strike, and steepness of the dip, may produce reefs which are relatively flat to very high profile and full of small crevices. These features may be at varying angles to the shoreline and wave fronts. There are fewer large holes, tunnels and crevices in sandstone reefs, but often many deep but low near-horizontal crevices.

Kelp forests Kelp forests are a variation of rocky reefs, as the kelp requires a fairly strong and stable substrate which can withstand the loads of repeated waves dragging on the kelp plants. The Sea bamboo Ecklonia maxima grows in water which is shallow enough to allow it to reach to the surface with its gas-filled stipes, so that the fronds form a dense layer at or just below the surface, depending on the tide. The shorter Split-fan kelp Laminaria pallida grows mostly on deeper reefs, where there is not so much competition from the sea bamboo. Both these kelp species provide food and shelter for a variety of other organisms, particularly the Sea bamboo, which is a base for a wide range of epiphytes, which in turn provide food and shelter for more organisms.

Sandy beaches and bottoms (including shelly, pebble and gravel bottoms) Sandy bottoms at first glance appear to be fairly barren areas, as they lack the stability to support many of the spectacular reef based species, and the variety of large organisms is relatively low. The sand is continually being moved around by wave action, to a greater or lesser degree depending on weather conditions and exposure of the area. This means that sessile organisms must be specifically adapted to areas of relatively loose substrate to thrive in them, and the variety of species found on a sandy or gravel bottom will depend on all these factors. Sandy bottoms have one important compensation for their instability, animals can burrow into the sand and move up and down within its layers, which can provide feeding opportunities and protection from predation. Other species can dig themselves holes in which to shelter, or may feed by filtering water drawn through the tunnel, or by extending body parts adapted to this function into the water above the sand.

The open sea The pelagic water column is the major part of the living space at sea. This is the water between the surface and the top of the benthic zone, where living organisms swim, float or drift, and the food chain starts with phytoplankton, the mostly microscopic photosynthetic organisms that convert the energy of sunlight into organic material which feeds nearly everything else, directly or indirectly. In temperate seas there are distinct seasonal cycles of phytoplankton growth, based on the available nutrients and the available sunlight. Either can be a limiting factor. Phytoplankton tend to thrive where there is plenty of light, and they themselves are a major factor in restricting light penetration to greater depths, so the photosynthetic zone tends to be shallower in areas of high productivity. Zooplankton feed on the phytoplankton, and are in turn eaten by larger animals. The larger pelagic animals are generally faster moving and more mobile, giving them the option of changing depth to feed or to avoid predation, and to move to other places in search of a better food supply.

=== Marine species diversity ===
==== Animals ====
Birds - breeding colonies of:

- African oystercatcher
- Kelp gull
- Chroicocephalus hartlaubii (Hartlaub's gull)
- Swift tern
- Crowned cormorant
- Cape cormorant
- Bank cormorant

==== Endemism ====
The MPA is in the cool temperate Benguela ecoregion to the west of Cape Point which extends northwards to the Orange River. There are a moderate proportion of species endemic to South Africa along this coastline.

== See also ==
Marine protected areas of South Africa
- List of protected areas of South Africa
- Marine protected areas of South Africa – Protected areas of coastline or ocean in the EEZ of South Africa
