= USCGC Salvia =

Iris-class buoy tender

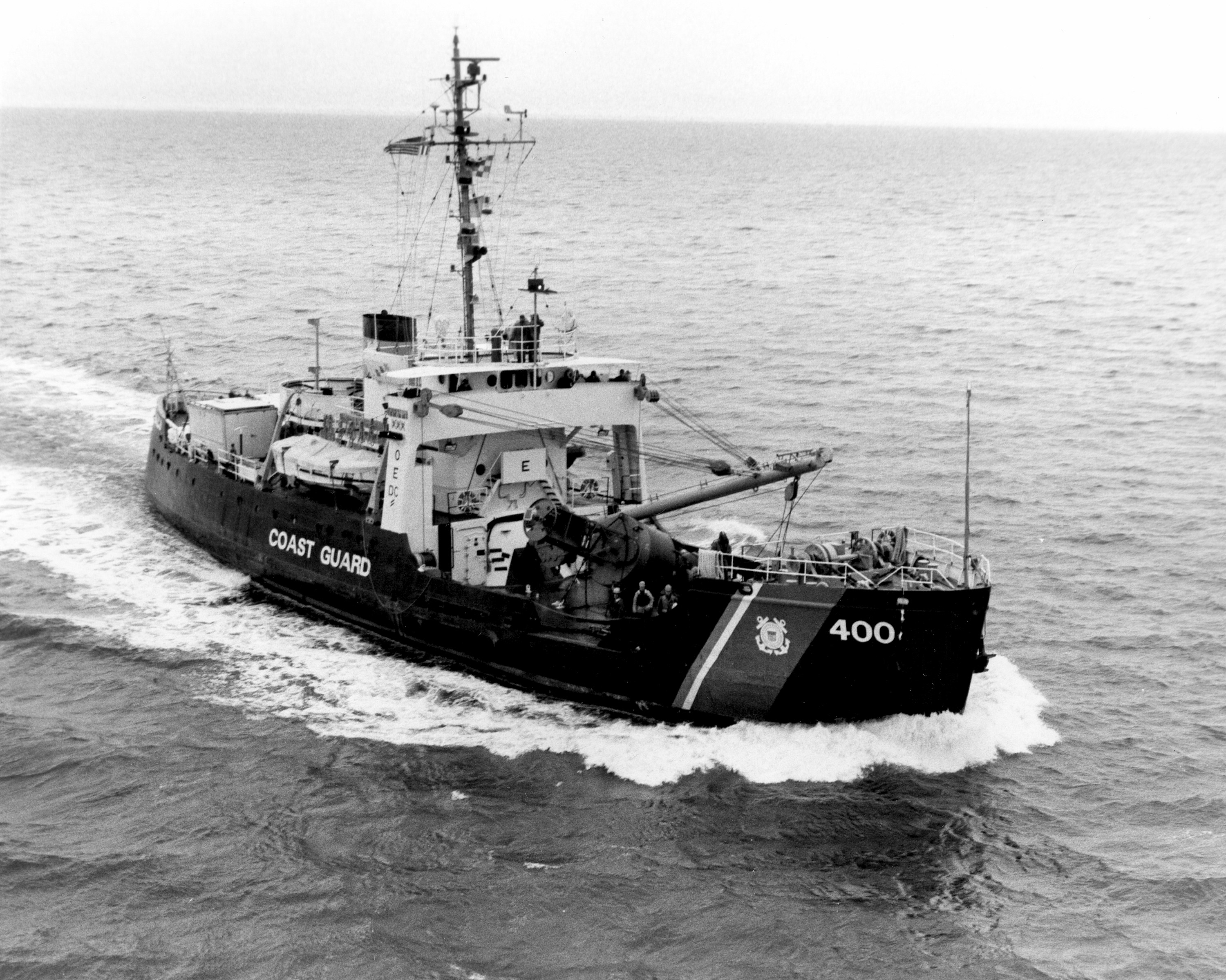
- USCGC Salvia underway in 1971.

History

United States
- Name: USCGC Salvia (WLB-400)
- Namesake: Salvia, the largest genus of plants in the mint family
- Builder: Zenith Dredge Corporation, Duluth, Minnesota
- Laid down: 24 June 1943
- Launched: 19 September 1943
- Commissioned: 19 February 1944
- Decommissioned: 4 October 1991
- Fate: Sold 2020
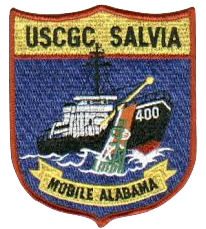
- Badge

United States
- Name: Brian Davis
- Namesake: Brian Davis, a North Carolina diver who died in an accident
- Acquired: 2020
- Fate: Scuttled as artificial reef 24 July 2020

General characteristics
- Class & type: Iris-class buoy tender
- Displacement: 935 long tons (950 t)
- Length: 180 ft (55 m)
- Beam: 47 ft 1 in (14.35 m)
- Draft: 12 ft (3.7 m)
- Propulsion: 1 × electric motor connected to 2 Westinghouse generators driven by 2 Cooper Bessemer-type GND-8, 4-cycle diesels; single screw
- Speed: 8.3 kn (15.4 km/h; 9.6 mph) cruising; 13 kn (24 km/h; 15 mph) maximum
- Complement: 6 officers; 74 enlisted
- Armament: 1 × 3 inch gun; 2 × 20 mm/80; 2 × depth charge tracks; 2 × Mousetraps; 4 × Y-guns

USCGC Salvia (WLB-400) was a United States Coast Guard Iris-class buoy tender in commission from 1944 to 1991. She operated in the Great Lakes and along the United States Gulf Coast during her career. Sold and renamed Brian Davis in 2020 for use as a memorial vessel, she was scuttled as an artificial reef in 2020.

== Construction and commissioning ==
Salvia was constructed by the Zenith Dredge Corporation at Duluth, Minnesota. Launched on 19 September 1943, she was commissioned on 19 February 1944.

== Design ==
The Iris-class buoy tenders were constructed after the Mesquite-class buoy tenders. Salvia cost $923,995 to construct and had an overall length of 180 feet (55 m). She had a beam of 37 feet (11 m) and a draft of up to 12 feet (3.7 m) at the time of construction, although this was increased to 14 feet 7 inches (4.45 m) in 1966. She initially had a displacement of 935 long tons (950 t; 1,047 short tons); this was increased to 1,026 long tons (1,042 t; 1,149 short tons) in 1966. She was powered by one electric motor. This was connected up to two Westinghouse generators which were driven by two CooperBessemer GND-8 four-cycle diesel engines. She had a single screw.

The Iris-class buoy tenders had maximum sustained speeds of 13 knots (24 km/h; 15 mph), although this diminished to around 11.9 knots (22.0 km/h; 13.7 mph) in 1966. For economic and effective operation, they had to initially operate at 8.3 knots (15.4 km/h; 9.6 mph), although this increased to 8.5 knots (15.7 km/h; 9.8 mph) in 1966. The ships had a complement of six officers and seventy-four crew members in 1945; this decreased to two warrants, four officers, and forty-seven men in 1966. They were fitted with a SL1 radar system and QBE-3A sonar system in 1945. Their armament consisted of one 3"/50 caliber gun, two 20 mm/80 guns, two Mousetraps, two depth charge tracks, and four Y-guns in 1945; these were removed in 1966.

== Career ==
International radio call sign of USCGC Salvia (WLB-400)
November	Oscar	Delta	Sierra

After commissioning, Salvia was assigned to aid-to-navigation (ATON) and icebreaking duties in the Great Lakes. In May 1944, she was assigned to the 5th Coast Guard District and stationed in Portsmouth, Virginia, where she remained until the end of World War II in 1945.

After the war, Salvia was homeported in Mobile, Alabama, and continued to perform general ATON duties. In April 1951 she was disabled in Calasieu Pass near Cameron, Louisiana, and was towed back to port by the cutter USCGC Tampa (WPG-164). In December 1968, Salvia searched for survivors from the lost coastal buoy tender USCGC White Alder (WLM-541). She was decommissioned on 4 October 1991.

Salvia was used as a training vessel for the United States Navy for a time as well (dates unknown). It was docked at JEB Little Creek while belonging to Mobile Diving and Salvage Unit 2. It was used to train Navy Divers in salvage operations.

== Disposal ==
By mid-May 2019, Salvia was lying at Virginia Beach, Virginia, in scrap condition, with her engines and most equipment removed, and the General Services Administration had put her up for auction.

In 2020, Salvia was sold for use as a memorial vessel and artificial reef. Renamed Brian Davis in memory of a local diver, she was scuttled on 24 July 2020 in southern Onslow Bay off Topsail Beach, North Carolina, about 15 nautical miles (28 km; 17 mi) from Topsail Inlet and 18 nautical miles (33 km; 21 mi) from Masonboro Inlet at 34°09.514′N 077°25.782′W, as a part of artificial reef project AR-368.

== See also ==
- List of United States Coast Guard cutters
