= Robert Gaskin =

Shipwreck in the St. Lawrence river

History

Canada
- Name: Robert Gaskin
- Launched: 1863
- Fate: Sank 18 September 1889

General characteristics
- Length: 132 ft (40 m)
- Beam: 28 ft (8.5 m)
- Draft: 11 ft (3.4 m)

Robert Gaskin is a ship wreck in the St. Lawrence river outside of the city of Brockville, Ontario. The ship was being used to recover the wrecked train ferry William Armstrong. Lift pontoons were being lowered to help provide lift capacity to raise the Armstrong, but a chain connecting the Armstrong to a pontoon broke—as it came to the water's surface the pontoon struck the Gaskin . There was no loss of life when the Gaskin sank. There was an initial concern that the Gaskin struck the Armstrong and would have prevented the salvage of the Armstrong. The Gaskin, however, landed sufficiently far away that it did not damage the Armstrong.

Equipment on the Gaskin's deck was recovered. On 11 November 1889, an attempt was made to raise the Gaskin. However, a lift pontoon failed as the Gaskin was reaching the surface. The Gaskin sank again, this time landing close enough to the Armstrong that the salvage of the Gaskin would have needed to be completed before salvage of the Armstrong could continue.

The final attempt to raise the Gaskin occurred on 25 November 1889. A lift pontoon attached to the rear of the Gaskin failed. The salvage of the Gaskin was abandoned.
