= Lumberman (shipwreck) =

Schooner that sank in Lake Michigan

- Lumberman shipwreck
- U.S. National Register of Historic Places
- Location within Wisconsin
- Location: Lake Michigan off the coast of Oak Creek, Wisconsin
- Coordinates: 42°52′10.32″N 87°45′25.2″W
- NRHP reference No.: 08001331
- Added to NRHP: January 14, 2009

Lumberman was a three-masted schooner that sank in 1893 in Lake Michigan off the coast of Oak Creek, Wisconsin, United States. In 2009 the shipwreck site was added to the National Register of Historic Places.

== History ==
The Lumberman was built in 1862 in the shipyard of Allyne Litchfield at Blendon's Landing, Michigan. She was a three-masted schooner with a wooden hull 126.5 feet (38.6 m) long. For thirty years, she carried forest products like lumber, bark and shingles from logging outposts on the shores of Lake Michigan to markets like Chicago.

On April 6, 1893, heading from Chicago to Whitefish Bay to pick up a load of ties, the vessel sank in a fast-moving storm. Much of the ship's equipment and the crew's personal effects have been salvaged, but the ship itself remains largely intact and is a popular site for divers and archaeologists. She is of particular interest to marine archaeologists because of the double centerboard she was equipped with, since the reasons for fitting two centerboards in some lake schooners and one in others has been lost. She lies in 53 to 70 feet (16 to 21 m) of water, roughly 10 miles (16 km) north of Wind Point.
