= SS Keystorm =

Shipwreck in the Great Lakes off Ontario in 1912

History
- Builder: Swan, Hunter & Wigham Richardson, Ltd.
- Laid down: 1910
- Launched: 30 March 1910
- Fate: Sank 26 October 1912

General characteristics
- Type: lake freighter
- Length: 250 ft (76 m)
- Beam: 42 ft 5 in (12.93 m)
- Depth: 17 ft 5 in (5.31 m)

SS Keystorm was a steel freighter that sank in 1912 after hitting Scow Island shoal in the St. Lawrence River. The sinking was considered the most significant accident in the area for the previous 50 years.

After the sinking, the captain and first mate were found guilty of negligence.

The wreck was sold in 1917 and her cargo salvaged in 1919.
