= SS Eastfield =

Ship sunk off Cornwall in 1917, now a dive site

History

United Kingdom
- Name: SS Eastfield
- Owner: The Field Line (Cardiff) Ltd.
- Builder: Osbourne, Graham & Co., North Hylton, Sunderland
- Yard number: 113
- Launched: 4 December 1900
- Identification: Official number: 112797
- Fate: Sunk, 27 November 1917

General characteristics
- Type: Armed merchant ship
- Tonnage: 2,145 GRT
- Length: 87.2 m (286 ft 1 in)
- Beam: 13.1 m (43 ft 0 in)
- Depth: 5.8 m (19 ft 0 in)
- Propulsion: 3-cylinder triple expansion steam engine, 212 hp (158 kW)

SS Eastfield was a 2,150-ton armed steamship which was torpedoed by the German U-boat SM UB-57 on 27 November 1917. The wreck sits intact at 50°14.255′N 4°42.262′W at a depth of 50 metres (160 ft) off Mevagissey, Cornwall. The cargo of coal can be found scattered on the sea bed nearby.

The ship was built by Osbourne, Graham & Company of Sunderland in 1901, and owned by The Field Line (Cardiff) Ltd.
