= MS King Cruiser =

Car ferry that sank off the West Coast of Southern Thailand

History
- Name: King Cruiser
- Launched: 13 May 1969
- Identification: IMO number: 6925599
- Fate: Sunk 4 May 1997

General characteristics
- Type: Car ferry
- Length: 85m
- Beam: 25m
- Height: ~30m

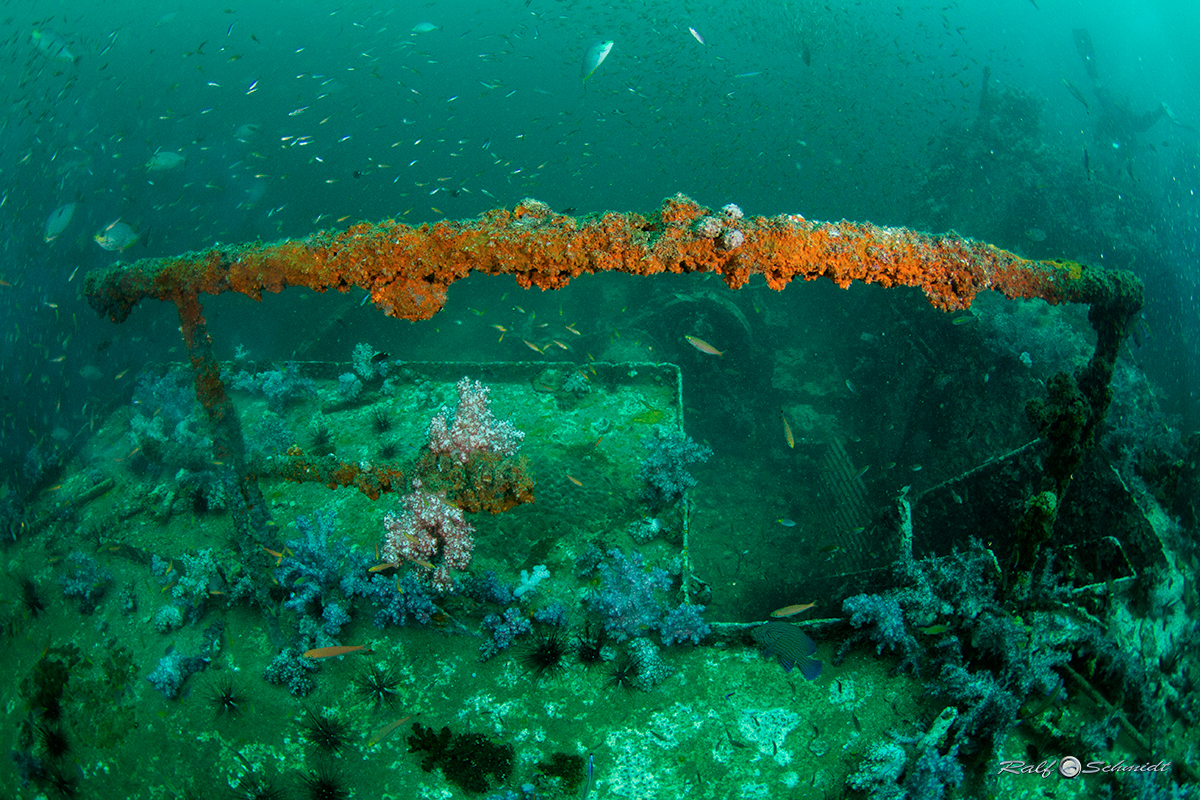
A Panorama of the wreck

MS King Cruiser was a car ferry that sank off the West Coast of Southern Thailand on 4 May 1997.

The ferry was operating between Phuket and the Phi Phi Islands in southern Thailand when she hit a submerged collection of rocky pinnacles at the dive site Anemone Reef, 10 miles off Phi Phi Island. The impact tore a large hole in the hull, and the vessel sank within two and a half hours.

All 561 passengers – including both Thai locals and foreign tourists – were rescued. They were picked up by the two police patrol boats and four or five fishing boats which had raced to the rescue in response to an emergency call. One elderly woman sustained a broken back and several others suffered shock.

== Causes of the sinking ==
The ferry was on a regular crossing in normal conditions, and the Anemone Reef was charted and well known by captains in the area. This has led to various unproven theories as to why the accident occurred. Theories include insurance fraud due to the owners experiencing financial difficulties on the unprofitable route, and also that local dive companies paid the captain to sink the vessel as, up until that time, there was no wreck dives around Phuket. The captain was found to be negligent.

== Recreational dive site ==
The vessel is now a popular recreational dive site and acts as an artificial reef to complement the Anemone Reef. The vessel sits upright on a sandy bottom in around 30 m of water. Originally the shallowest part of the wreck rose to about 10 m, but most of the superstructure has collapsed making the shallowest part of the wreck currently deeper than 18 m.

The wreck remains largely in one piece, although all of the upper deck has collapsed. The simplest and safest point of entry is through the vessel's stern, where divers can explore the car decks. Machinery still sits on the deck. Inside the car-deck are a couple of vehicle tyres and an engine trolley. Rows of passenger seats and low coffee tables fill the inner recesses. The collapsed foredeck is at 18 metres, where there is often a shoal of snappers. The upper deck is split from front to back.

Within and around the wreck there is much coral growth and an abundance of fish. Soft corals can be found growing along the sides and top of the wreck. Schools of bigeye trevally are often spotted circling above the captain's cabin. Large schools of yellow snapper hang around the entrances to the car deck and along the remains of the upper deck, and many Scorpionfish particularly lionfish can be seen around the wreck. There are also occasional encounters with zebra sharks and bamboo sharks, barracuda and turtles.
