= MV Aeolian Sky =

Greek registered freighter sunk off Dorset after a collision

History

Greece
- Owner: Proteus Maritime SA
- Port of registry: Piraeus, Greece
- Builder: Hashihama Shipyard, Japan
- Launched: 2 November 1977
- Completed: 1978
- Identification: IMO number: 7640445
- Fate: Sunk 4 November 1979 following collision

General characteristics
- Type: Cargo ship
- Tonnage: 10,715 GRT
- Length: 148 m (485 ft 7 in)
- Beam: 21.95 m (72 ft 0 in)

Aeolian Sky was a Greek-run freighter built in 1978, which collided with another ship near the Channel Islands and after a failed attempt at salvage sank off the coast of Dorset, England in a storm in late 1979.

== Description ==
The Aeolian Sky was completed in 1978 at the Japanese Hashihama Shipyard. She was 148 metres (485 ft 7 in) long, measured over 14,000 tonnes, and was valued at £3 million. Registered in the Greek port of Piraeus, she was run by Proteus Maritime SA, and was a conventional modern ship with crew quarters in the superstructure and her own large derricks for unloading cargo.

== Sinking ==
In late 1979 the Aeolian Sky sailed from Hull, via Rotterdam, to Dar es Salaam, Tanzania. On 3 November 1979 while travelling 20 miles off the coast of Guernsey in the Channel Islands she collided with the German coaster Anna Knueppell in fog, during a storm at 4.30 a.m. A French tug based at Cherbourg, the Abeille Languedoc, went to the scene and managed to get a line aboard. Plans were initially laid to tow her back to the French port; only lightly damaged, the Anna Knuepell stood by to render assistance if needed.

At 9.30 in the morning a Royal Navy helicopter arrived and evacuated most of the crew; it then had to withdraw to its base at Lee-on-Solent with engine problems, leaving a handful of crew aboard the now sinking vessel. By this time the ship had drifted some distance and was sinking at the bows, so the initial plan was abandoned and the tug headed for The Solent.

However, the port authorities of Portsmouth and Southampton, concerned that the ship would sink fouling their busy waterways, declined permission for her to enter either port. With the weather at gale force, the tug started to tow the Aeolian Sky into the storm to try to make the shelter of Portland Harbour. However at 3.45 a.m. on 4 November 1979, she took on too much water and sank 5 miles south of St Aldhelm's Head, still 12 miles from the safety of Portland. She settled on her port side in 30 metres of water with her bows facing south.

== The wreck ==
Since her sinking the wreck has become a popular dive site as she is accessible from Swanage, Weymouth and Isle of Portland based diving trips. At the time of sinking, she lay 9 metres (30 ft) below the surface but salvage work, and explosives used to reduce the risk of her becoming a hazard to navigation, have lowered this to 18 metres (59 ft). Her bow was blown off during this activity and lies separate from the main body of the wreck. The wreck is at 50°30.55′N 2°8.33′W.

Diver Magazine has produced a tour of the wreck.

== Cargo ==
She lies surrounded by parts of Land Rovers and pipes that were among her cargo: she was also carrying two 0-6-0 diesel electric locomotives manufactured by Brush Traction for the Tanzania Railways Corporation, and a load of chemicals, some hazardous. Also among her cargo were a million pounds in Seychelles Rupees, most of which have yet to be recovered (although a few have made their way to auction). Divers report that the wreck is surrounded by thousands of jars of Marmite.
