= Hilsea Point Rock =

Group of pinnacles in the English Channel off Devon

Hilsea Point Rock is an area of the English Channel located 0.5 nm south-east of Hilsea Point, Devon. It consists of seven or eight pinnacles ranging in depth between 25 metres on the sea bed and 2 metres at the surface

The one pinnacle at 50°17.337′N 04°02.710′W is split in two, from top to bottom in the north–south line. The crack is narrow at the top but is about 1 metre wide at a depth of about 23 metres providing a "swim through" of about 15 metres for divers.
