= MV Dania =

Cargo ship scuttled as a dive site off Bamburi, Kenya

History
- Name: Dania (1965–1976); Kviksholm (1976–1981); Rodriguez (1981–1987); Dania (1987–2002)
- Owner: Nieuwe Kustvaart Mij Naamloze Vennootschap
- Port of registry: Amsterdam
- Builder: Hatlo Verksted SA (Ulsteinvik)
- Launched: 1965
- Fate: Scuttled in 2002

General characteristics
- Displacement: 495 long tons
- Length: 75 m (246 ft 1 in)
- Beam: 10.9 m (35 ft 9 in)
- Draught: 3.81 m (12 ft 6 in)
- Installed power: 1,400 hp (1,000 kW)
- Propulsion: MAK 8-cylinder diesel
- Speed: 13kn

Dania was a cargo ship that was scuttled on 27 October 2002 at Nyali Reef, just off Bamburi, Kenya.

== Construction and career ==
The MV Dania was built in Ulsteinvik (Norway) for the Amsterdam-based shipping company Nieuwe Kustvaart Mij Naamloze Vennootschap, trading in North and Baltic seas.

In November 1976, the ship was sold to the Norwegian ship-owner Simon Mokster and renamed Kviksholm. It was sold again in August 1981 to the Mauritius-based ship-owner Mascareignes Shipping and Trading Company Limited and renamed Rodriguez, after an island of the Mascarene Archipelago. It was then turned into a cattle ship, shuttling between South Africa, Mozambique and Mauritius.

In 1987, it was bought by Columbus Incorporated. Registered at San Morenzo, Honduras, renamed to the original name, and continued operating along the African coast of the Indian Ocean and northward to the Persic Gulf.

Finally, in 1997, its last owner was Spanfreight Shipping Limited, based in Mombasa, Kenya.

In 2001, the ship was disused, due to the collapse of live cattle transport in the region. Bound for demolition in India, it was eventually bought by the diving club Buccaneer Diving, which had it prepared, decontaminated, cleaned and finally scuttled (with the agreement of Kenya Wildlife Service) off the Leven reef close to Mombasa, at 30 m depth on 27 October 2002.

== Tourism ==
The shipwreck is located 1.5 kilometres (0.93 mi) from ras Iwetine in Bamburi, north of Mombasa: this represents ten minutes of travel by motorboat. Its coordinates are 4.017746°S 39.7743155°E. She lies on a 30 m (98 ft) depth sandy bottom, with the highest elements at 12 m (39 ft) depth at low tide. The wreck has safe mooring at a buoy for dive boats. The remains of the Dania lie in shallow waters that are well suited to diving. She is a popular recreational scuba diving destination. The wreck has been colonized by a wide diversity of animal species.
