= Bud Bar =

Artificial reef near Boynton Beach, Florida

Coordinates: 26°28.70′N 80°02.31′W

Bud Bar is an artificial reef near Boynton Beach, Florida. It was created when MS Havel, a 169-foot (52 m) long German freighter that was used to haul goods between Florida, the Bahamas, and Haiti, was sunk in 95 feet (29 m) of water on July 16, 1987. The ship was renamed Budweiser Bar or Bud Bar because the company donated money to sink the ship.
