= Cagdanao =

Island in the province of Palawan in the Philippines

Cagdanao Island
- Location within Philippines

Geography
- Coordinates: 11°4′20″N 119°44′1″E
- Archipelago: Calamian Group of Islands
- Adjacent to: South China Sea; Sulu Sea

Administration
- Philippines
- Region: Mimaropa
- Province: Palawan

Additional information

Cagdanao is an island in the northern part of the province of Palawan in the Philippines. The island is located 29 kilometres (18 mi) east from the town of Taytay in northern Palawan, 2 miles (3.2 km) east of Batas Island and 13 kilometres (8.1 mi) from El Nido Airport.

The island is surrounded with a coral reef, from shallow coral gardens to deep drop-offs on the north side. Cagdanao Island offers a variety of diving sites around the island. On the island, beaches frontage of 400 metres (1,300 ft) with white sand and a 500 metres (1,600 ft) of flat land that extends back to the edge of the hills. Hilly elevation with vegetation like palms, loamy and forest soil sandy.

Access to the island is mainly from Palawan, via a 40-minute sail with a speedboat. Cagdanao Island is a popular site for snorkeling and scuba diving in and around its coral reef. Damselfish (Pomacentridae), gobies (Gobiidae) and wrasses (Labridae) are the most abundant fish families.

A beach resort called Cagdanao Island Beach Resort is situated on the island.

== See also ==
- List of islands of the Philippines
