= Island City (schooner) =

Schooner that sank in Lake Michigan

- Island City Shipwreck (Schooner)
- U.S. National Register of Historic Places
- Location within Wisconsin
- Location: Off the coasts of Mequon, Wisconsin and Port Washington, Wisconsin
- Coordinates: 43°14′18″N 87°50′43″W
- NRHP reference No.: 11000810
- Added to NRHP: November 10, 2011

Island City was a schooner that sank in Lake Michigan off the coasts of Mequon, Wisconsin and Port Washington, Wisconsin, United States. On November 10, 2011, the shipwreck site was added to the National Register of Historic Places.

== History ==
The Island City was built by Peter Perry in Sans Souci, Michigan in 1859. For most of her service, the vessel carried produce and other merchandise to and from Detroit, Michigan and various other ports on Lake Saint Clair. She later hauled lumber across other portions of Lake Michigan and sank in a storm while en route from Ludington, Michigan to Milwaukee, Wisconsin. She lies southeast of Port Washington in 135 to 140 feet (41 to 43 m) of water.
