= Igara wreck =

Bulk carrier wrecked off the coast of Malaysia in 1973

History

Italy
- Fate: Sunk 12 March 1973
- Notes: Bow section only

General characteristics
- Tonnage: 72,741 GRT
- Length: 297.2 m (975 ft 1 in)
- Beam: 40.8 m (133 ft 10 in)
- Draught: 22.3 m (73 ft 2 in)
- Capacity: 127,718 tons

Igara is a wreck off the East Coast of Malaysia that sank on 12 March 1973. At the time of her sinking, the Igara was the largest ever single marine insurance loss in maritime history. Valued at over US$25 million ($181 million in 2025), she was loaded with 127,718 tonnes of Brazilian iron ore. The Igara was an Italian ore/oil steamship of 136,400 tonnes deadweight (DWT). It was on voyage from Vitoria to Muroran when after passing through the Sunda Strait, she struck an uncharted rock in the South China Sea about 190 miles (310 km) from Horsburgh Lighthouse, off Mendarik Island, on 11 March 1973. However, she did not sink immediately but continued her voyage until her bow settled submerged and resting on the sea bottom in approximately 40 metres (131 ft 3 in) of water about 70 miles (110 km) from Singapore. She settled with her entire stern section sticking out of the water. The following day 27 of the 38-man crew abandoned ship, being picked up in their lifeboats by passing vessels. The master and 10 crew stayed on board until 19 March, when she began to break across hold no. 1. Salvors used explosives to cut through the ship at hold no. 1, and the entire rear section of the ship was towed to Japan, where a new forward section was attached and she was renamed the Eraclide.

== Subsequent salvage ==
ICRL (International Cargo Recoveries Limited), a BVI-based salvage management company, recognized the value of remaining iron ore cargo, contacted the insurers and acquired the legal rights to the ore and the salvage rights to the hull. In 2005–06 ICRL contracted Deep Water Recoveries (S) Pte Ltd (“DWR”) to recover the ore. DWR recovered all the ore accessible to big grabs (60,000 mt), and the operation grossed US$2.5 million.

There are also other ships that have been taking pieces of metal from the ship wreck.

== Recreational dive site ==
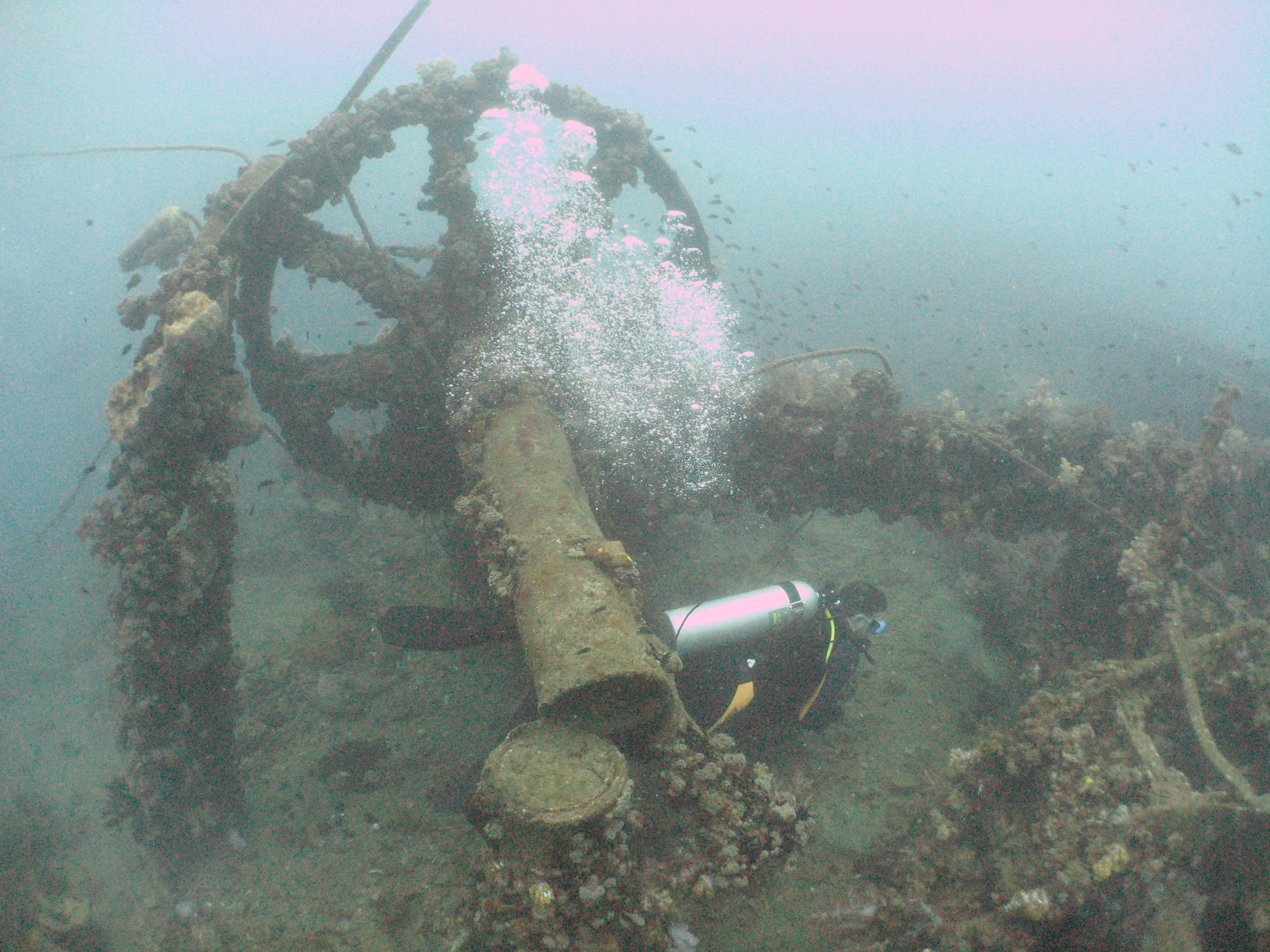
Diver on the wreck of Igara

The ship now lies in around 40 m (130 ft) of water rising to 16 m (52 ft) at the top of the wreck. Despite only half the wreck remaining, this is a huge wreck with vast open cargo holds. The site is prone to very strong currents and occasional bad visibility. It is commonly frequented by Singapore-based liveaboards which stop for a dive or two on the way back to Singapore after a weekend diving in the South China Sea.

The wreck was nicknamed the 'turtle wreck' by divers due to a resident turtle although more recent reports suggest the turtle is no longer present. Three resident nurse sharks are sometimes spotted in the storage rooms in the stern. As of 2010, divers reported seeing a large nurse shark inside the rope room at the bow on nearly every dive. The wreck is overgrown with soft corals, sponges and hydroids. Divers frequently see schools of barracudas, snappers, fusiliers, angelfish, groupers, and batfish. Divers have also reported seeing a large and aggressive grouper.

== Sources ==
- Igara entry on Rec N Tec wreck database
- DeepWrecks.sg wreck page
