= SS Radaas =

Ship sunk in 1917 near Portland Bill, now a dive site

History
- Name: Marstonmoor (1890–1902); Athos Romanos (1902–1916); Radaas (1916–1917)
- Owner: Moor Line (1890–1902); Vagliano A.S. (1902–1916); Schach Steenberg & Co. (1916–1917)
- Builder: J. Readhead & Sons, South Shields
- Yard number: 264
- Launched: 17 September 1890
- Completed: December 1890
- Fate: Torpedoed and sunk on 21 September 1917

General characteristics
- Type: Cargo ship
- Tonnage: 2,524 GRT
- Length: 290 ft (88 m)
- Beam: 40 ft (12 m)
- Depth: 20 ft (6.1 m)
- Installed power: 234 nhp
- Propulsion: Triple expansion engine

SS Radaas was a 2,524-ton cargo steamship. She was built by and launched in 1890 as Marstonmoor for Moor Lines. She was sold to a Greek company in 1902 and renamed Athos Romanos, before being sold to Danish interests during the First World War and renamed Radaas. She was sunk by the German submarine UB-40 under the command of Oberleutnant Hans Howaldt on 21 September 1917. She was 18 miles west of Portland Bill en route from Tyne to Bordeaux when the torpedo struck her in the port side. The wreck lies on a sandy bed at a depth of 30 metres (98 ft) at 50°34′13″N 3°4′50″W.
