= Dutch Springs =

Flooded quarry in Pennsylvania used as a recreational diving site

Lake Hydra
- Location within Pennsylvania Location within the United States
- Location: Northampton County, near Bethlehem, Pennsylvania
- Coordinates: 40.6845°N 75.3556°W
- Type: lake/recreation area
- Basin countries: United States
- Max. depth: 100 ft (30 m)
- Website: http://dutchsprings.com

Lake Hydra is a spring-fed lake located north of the city of Bethlehem, Pennsylvania, in the United States. Since 1980, a commercial recreation area, with facilities for scuba diving, has operated at the location. Lake Hydra had planned on selling the property to a warehouse company and it was expected to close operations. In 2022 the Dutch Springs commercial diving and training facility was reopened under the name "Lake Hydra".

== History ==
In 1933 the National Portland Cement Company purchased the land now known as Dutch Springs and began manufacturing cement and mining limestone. As the mining operation continued, the quarry began to fill with water. For the remainder of the quarry’s operational life, water had to be continuously pumped out. When National Portland Cement shut down in the 1970s, the pumps shut down as well and the now 50-acre (200,000 m^{2}) quarry filled with water.

In 1980, the land was bought and turned into a freshwater diving facility. The facility is currently owned by Stuart Schooley. Between 1986 and 2015, at least 16 deaths occurred at Dutch Springs, including that of a teenage boy in 2011.

== Ecology ==
The lake is now home to many fish. Different species include largemouth bass, bluegills, koi, yellow perch as well as rainbow, zebra mussel, Crayfish, and palomino trout.

== Facilities ==
Today, Dutch Springs is an attraction for scuba divers of all levels. Sunken wooden platforms are used for diver certification testing, and numerous attractions such as a fire truck, school bus, trolley and several aircraft are submerged at different depths throughout the quarry.

In addition to the added underwater attractions, the original pumping station used by the National Portland Cement Company is now a popular dive site within the lake.

Local divers participate in an annual New Year's Eve dive. The Boy Scouts of America offers a merit badge in scuba diving and Dutch springs provides site access and rental of some pieces of necessary diving equipment, such as air and weights.

Dutch Springs also offers an "Aqua Park" and "Sky Challenge" as an alternative to scuba diving.

== See also ==
- List of lakes in Pennsylvania – List of lakes and reservoirs in Pennsylvania
