= SS Pioneer (1905) =

Steam dredging ship

History

Australia
- Name: SS Pioneer
- Owner: Government of Victoria
- Operator: Department of Ports & Harbours, Melbourne
- Builder: Ferguson Shipbuilders, Port Glasgow
- Yard number: 161
- Launched: 15 April 1905
- Identification: Official number: 120520
- Fate: Scuttled off Port Phillip, 9 March 1950

General characteristics
- Type: Hopper Dredger
- Tonnage: 543 GRT; 192 NRT
- Length: 170 ft (52 m) p/p
- Beam: 37 ft 1 in (11.30 m)
- Depth: 10 ft 3 in (3.12 m)
- Propulsion: 2 × triple expansion steam engines, 2 shafts
- Speed: 9 knots (17 km/h)

SS Pioneer was a steam dredging ship which was in service with the Department of Ports & Harbours, Melbourne, Australia, from 1905 to 1975.

Pioneer was finally scuttled in 50 metres (160 ft) of water in the "Ships' Graveyard" off Point Lonsdale on 9 March 1950.
