= SS James Caldwell =

Liberty ship of WWII

History

United States
- Name: James Caldwell
- Namesake: James Caldwell
- Owner: War Shipping Administration (WSA)
- Operator: A.H. Bull & Co., Inc.
- Ordered: as type (EC2-S-C1) hull, MCE hull 915
- Awarded: 1 January 1942
- Builder: Bethlehem-Fairfield Shipyard, Baltimore, Maryland
- Cost: $1,044,622
- Yard number: 2065
- Way number: 11
- Laid down: 8 August 1942
- Launched: 19 September 1942
- Sponsored by: Mrs. W.G. Esmond
- Completed: 26 September 1942
- Identification: Call sign: KHKJ
- Fate: Laid up in the National Defense Reserve Fleet, Beaumont, Texas, 15 December 1948; Laid up in the National Defense Reserve Fleet, Mobile, Alabama, 28 June 1952; Turned over to the state of Mississippi for artificial reef, 2 December 1974, withdrawn from fleet, 17 December 1974

General characteristics
- Class & type: Liberty ship; type EC2-S-C1, standard
- Tonnage: 10,865 LT DWT; 7,176 GRT
- Displacement: 3,380 long tons (3,434 t) (light); 14,245 long tons (14,474 t) (max)
- Length: 441 feet 6 inches (135 m) oa; 416 feet (127 m) pp; 427 feet (130 m) lwl
- Beam: 57 feet (17 m)
- Draft: 27 ft 9.25 in (8.4646 m)
- Installed power: 2 × Oil fired 450 °F (232 °C) boilers, operating at 220 psi (1,500 kPa); 2,500 hp (1,900 kW)
- Propulsion: 1 × triple-expansion steam engine, (manufactured by General Machinery Corp., Hamilton, Ohio); 1 × screw propeller
- Speed: 11.5 knots (21.3 km/h; 13.2 mph)
- Capacity: 562,608 cubic feet (15,931 m^{3}) (grain); 499,573 cubic feet (14,146 m^{3}) (bale)
- Complement: 38–62 USMM; 21–40 USNAG
- Armament: Varied by ship; Bow-mounted 3-inch (76 mm)/50-caliber gun; Stern-mounted 4-inch (102 mm)/50-caliber gun; 2–8 × single 20-millimeter (0.79 in) Oerlikon anti-aircraft (AA) cannons and/or, 2–8 × 37-millimeter (1.46 in) M1 AA guns

SS James Caldwell was a Liberty ship built in the United States during World War II. She was named after James Caldwell, a Presbyterian minister who played a prominent part in the American Revolution. Caldwell was an active partisan on the side of the Patriots, and was known as the "Fighting Parson". He was killed on 24 November 1781, by an American sentry in Elizabethtown, New Jersey, when he refused to have a package inspected. The sentry, James Morgan, was hanged for murder on 29 January 1782 in Westfield, New Jersey, amid rumors that he had been bribed to kill the chaplain.

== Construction ==
James Caldwell was laid down on 8 August 1942, under a Maritime Commission (MARCOM) contract, MCE hull 915, by the Bethlehem-Fairfield Shipyard, Baltimore, Maryland; she was sponsored by Mrs. W.G. Esmond, the wife of the chief naval architect for MARCOM, in Washington DC, and was launched on 19 September 1942.

== History ==
She was allocated to A.H. Bull & Co., Inc., on 26 September 1942. On 15 December 1948, she was laid up in the National Defense Reserve Fleet, Beaumont, Texas. On 28 June 1952, she was laid up in the National Defense Reserve Fleet, Mobile, Alabama. On 2 December 1974, she was transferred to the state of Mississippi for use as an artificial reef. She was removed from the fleet on 17 December 1974. She was scuttled off Horn Island, at 30°09′59″N 88°45′13″W in 1976.

== Bibliography ==
- "Bethlehem-Fairfield, Baltimore MD". www.ShipbuildingHistory.com. 14 August 2008.
- Maritime Administration. "James Caldwell". Ship History Database Vessel Status Card. U.S. Department of Transportation, Maritime Administration.
- Davies, James (May 2004). "Specifications (As-Built)" (PDF). p. 23.
- "SS James Caldwell".
