= YO-257 =

US Navy yard oiler scuttled off Waikiki, Honolulu, Hawaii

History

United States
- Name: USS YO-257
- Launched: early 1940s
- In service: Delivered to the US Navy and placed in service as YOG-72, date unknown
- Renamed: Redesignated Fuel Barge (self-propelled) YO-257, date unknown
- Stricken: Struck from the Naval Register, date unknown
- Reinstated: date unknown, assigned to Naval Station Subic Bay
- Fate: Sold for scrapping, 1 August 1982, by the Defense Reutilization and Marketing Service; Final disposition, reefed off the coast of Oahu, Hawaii, near Waikiki in 1989

General characteristics
- Type: Oil barge
- Displacement: 440 t.(lt) 1,390 t.(fl)
- Length: 174 ft (53 m)
- Beam: 33 ft (10 m)
- Draft: 13 ft (4.0 m)
- Propulsion: General Motors Diesel engine, single screw, 640shp
- Capacity: 200,000 gallons fuel
- Armament: two single 20mm AA gun mounts

USS YO-257 was a Yard Oiler of the United States Navy that was launched in the early 1940s and scuttled two miles off Waikiki, Honolulu, Hawaii in 1989.

== Service history ==
Built in 1938, YO-257 saw action in World War II, the Korean War, and in the Vietnam War.

From 16 September to 12 November 1963, the ship was temporarily loaned to the Coast Guard to assist in the construction of a LORAN radio navigation station in Yap, Western Carolines, carrying water-based asphalt to be used for a runway for aircraft servicing the station.

After decommissioning, the ship was purchased by Atlantis Submarines Hawaii, who sank it as an artificial reef. The sea floor surrounding the ship is approximately 100 feet (30 m) deep, and the top deck of the ship is roughly 85 feet (26 m) deep. Directly abeam to the YO-257, colloquially called the YO by area divers, is the San Pedro, intentionally sunk by Atlantis Submarines in 1996. The two ships are visited frequently by Atlantis and are popular dive sites. There is sometimes a strong current at the surface, which eases as you approach the wreck. A descent line is always rigged to mooring buoys on the wreck. The typical dive profile is 90 feet for 20 minutes. There is a preponderance of marine life on both ships, mostly turtles and reef sharks, such as the whitetip reef shark.
