= Zingara (ship) =

Cargo vessel wrecked in the Straits of Tiran in the Red Sea

History
- Name: Kormoran (1963–1976); Adamastos (1963–1980); Zingara (1980–1984)
- Owner: Montemare di Navigazione S.P.A.
- Port of registry: Naples
- Builder: Rostock Shipyard
- Launched: 1963
- Fate: Wrecked, 21 August 1984 28.004526°N 34.484238°E

General characteristics
- Type: Cargo ship
- Tonnage: 1,744 GRT
- Length: 82.4 m (270 ft 4 in)
- Beam: 12.7 m (41 ft 8 in)
- Propulsion: 6-cylinder diesel engine
- Speed: 12 knots (22 km/h; 14 mph)

Zingara was a general cargo vessel that was wrecked in the Straits of Tiran in the Red Sea on 21 August 1984 and is now a recreational diving site.
