= Multi-purpose reef =

Underwater structure intended to produce surfable waves from prevailing swell

A multi-purpose reef, also commonly known as an artificial surfing reef or surf reef, is a structure located offshore designed to induce wave breaking in a manner that creates a wave suitable for surfing or body boarding. Artificial surfing reefs can exist in many different configurations and be built from a variety of different materials. To date there have been fewer than ten attempts worldwide to build such structures .

Artificial surfing reefs are a variation of a long existing type of coastal structure known as a submerged breakwater. Submerged breakwaters have historically been used for coastal protection. If an offshore structure is specifically designed for both the improvement of a recreational resource (i.e. wave riding) and coastal protection or stabilization, it can be classified as a multi-purpose reef.

== History ==
Artificial reefs have been developed for several centuries in Japan where fishermen noticed that around sunken fishing vessels their catch increased. As the vessels disintegrated, the fishermen started to deliberately place man-made (artificial) structures on the seabed to attract fish to catch.

Since this time, a number of artificial reef projects have been developed and, since perhaps the 1970s the 'science' of artificial reefs has been more seriously investigated; although many still consider placing anything in the sea (or lakes for that matter) constitutes an effective artificial reef.

Artificial reefs have historically been developed for one primary function, for example habitat creation, habitat defence, recreation (e.g. surfing, diving and sports fishing), coastal defence, and research and education.

In regard to surfing reefs, in 1997, surfers from Burkitts Reef, in Bargara, Queensland participated in an effort to improve the quality of a surfing wave on a natural reef. While not a structure in and of itself, the effort consisted of shifting boulders which caused the wave to break irregularly and at time dangerously over shallow rock. Work was completed using heavy equipment to move the offending rocks during the low tide when the rocks were exposed.

The first structure built specifically for the improvement of surfing was the Cable Station Reef constructed in 1999 in Perth, Western Australia. This structure was built from granite boulders placed on top of an existing limestone reef. The total volume of material placed was in the order of 3,500 m^{3}. Monitoring of the reef indicates that it is used for surfing when wave conditions are large enough. The site is hampered by the presence of offshore islands and reefs which block a significant fraction of the wave energy before reaching the site. However, when the swell is large enough or strong enough the reef produces good quality surfing waves.

Construction began on the Narrowneck or Gold Coast Reef in August 1999. This structure was much larger (70,000 m^{3}) in size and scope than the Cable Station Reef. The reef was designed primarily as a shoreline stabilization structure with a secondary purpose as a surfing structure; as such it was the first true 'multipurpose reef' structure. The reef was built as part of the Gold Coast City Council's 'Northern Gold Coast Beach Protection Strategy' which included a large volume of beach nourishment to be placed on the beach in addition to the construction of the reef. The Gold Coast Reef was built from large, sand-filled geotextile containers ('sandbags') which were dropped into position from a split hull barge.

In terms of its stated purpose as a coastal stabilization and sand retention structure, monitoring by the University of New South Wales Water Research Laboratory suggests that the reef has achieved its goal to produce a salient (wider beach) in the shadow of the structure. Further analysis of the shoreline change quantified the beach response in relation to the reef as being approximately 20 m wider than areas unaffected by the presence of the reef.

In September 2000, construction began on another artificial reef, this time along Dockweiler Beach in Los Angeles, California. The purpose of this structure was to mitigate for the loss of surfing amenities and resources resulting from the construction of rock groyne and an associated beach fill project which was completed along Dockweiler Beach in 1984. The project was named Pratte's Reef, in honor of Tom Pratte.

Like Narrowneck, Pratte's Reef was constructed from sand-filled geotextile containers. However, the containers used on Pratte's Reef were much smaller than those used on the Narrowneck Reef (~8 m^{3} per container at Pratte's versus 140–320 m^{3} per container at Narrowneck). Additionally, the total volume of the Pratte's Reef design was only 1400 m^{3}, approximately 50 times smaller than Narrowneck.

Extensive monitoring of the Pratte's Reef project showed that the reef had very little effect on the surfing conditions at Dockweiler Beach and that it had no measurable effect on the shoreline morphology. They attribute this to the very small structure volume and the instability of the reef construction units. Within two years from the initial construction, the reef had largely disintegrated. This was due to the rupture of the individual bags and due to wave scour and self-burial. The remains of the reef were removed in October 2009.

The next attempt to build an artificial surfing reef came in February 2005 when construction began on the Mount Reef in Mount Maunganui on the Bay of Plenty coast in New Zealand. The reef design called for a total volume of approximately 5,000 m^{3} to be contained in an arrangement of large sand-filled geotextile containers. The containers and material used on Mount Reef were similar to those used at Narrowneck, however with bigger diameters and longer lengths. The reef suffered through a series of snags in the construction process attributable to weather delays and equipment failure. Construction continued throughout 2005 and into 2006. Modifications to the reef were made as recently as late 2008.

Like Cable Station, the Mount Reef was designed purely to improve surfing wave quality. While there have been numerous documented instances of surfers using the reef and of high quality surfing waves breaking on the reef, many users complain that it does not work often enough as a surf break. Although it was not designed as a shore stabilization structure, an analysis of beach width and offshore survey data suggest that the beach in the shadow of the reef is up to 20 m wider than sections of the beach away from the reef (Weppe et al., 2009).

=== Boscombe Surf Reef ===
The most recently constructed artificial surfing reef is the Boscombe Surf Reef located in Boscombe, Bournemouth on the south coast of England. This was the first Surfing Reef to be constructed in the Northern Hemisphere. The town of Boscombe opted to build a surfing reef to provide a unique focal point for the town's multimillion-pound waterfront redevelopment effort (Bournemouth Borough Council, 2008). According to the local council, "The reef will give Boscombe beach its own identity, raise the profile of Boscombe and attract a large number of visitors on an annual basis."

The reef which was originally suggested in the late 1990s suffered considerable delays before construction finally began in June 2008 by the New Zealand Company ASR Ltd and half was completed during the summer of that year. Construction was suspended for the winter season and resumed the following summer. The reef was officially declared open on 2 November 2009. Like most of the other reefs built to date, the Boscombe Reef was built from large sand-filled geotextile containers. With a total volume of 13,000 m^{3}, the reef was designed purely as a surfing break. Since the reef was built, there have been a few documented instances of surfers riding waves breaking on the reef. As the season changes into the more energetic winter, it is expected that the reef will break more often. This has subsequently been removed due to damage, safety fears and performance issues.
