= J. D. Sedding =

English church architect

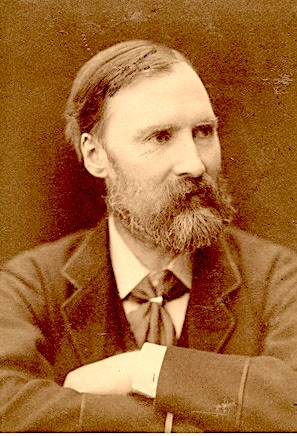
- Sedding in 1882
- Born: John Dando Sedding; 13 April 1838; Eton, Berkshire, England
- Died: 7 April 1891 (aged 52)
- Occupation: Architect
- Buildings: Holy Trinity Church, Sloane Street, London

John Dando Sedding (13 April 1838 – 7 April 1891) was an English church architect, working on new buildings and repair work, with an interest in a "crafted Gothic" style. He was an influential figure in the Arts and Crafts movement, many of whose leading designers, including Ernest Gimson, Ernest Barnsley and Herbert Ibberson, studied in his offices.

His 1889 lecture, "The Architectural Treatment of Gardens", was influential in the revival espoused by Reginald Blomfield, of "Jacobean" features such as terraces, covered walks, bowling greens, clipped yew hedges and topiary, which would combine with "cottage garden" elements in the Arts and Crafts gardens of 1890–1915.

The German architect and critic Hermann Muthesius said that "he formed the first bridge between the architects' camp and that of handicraft proper".

== Biography ==
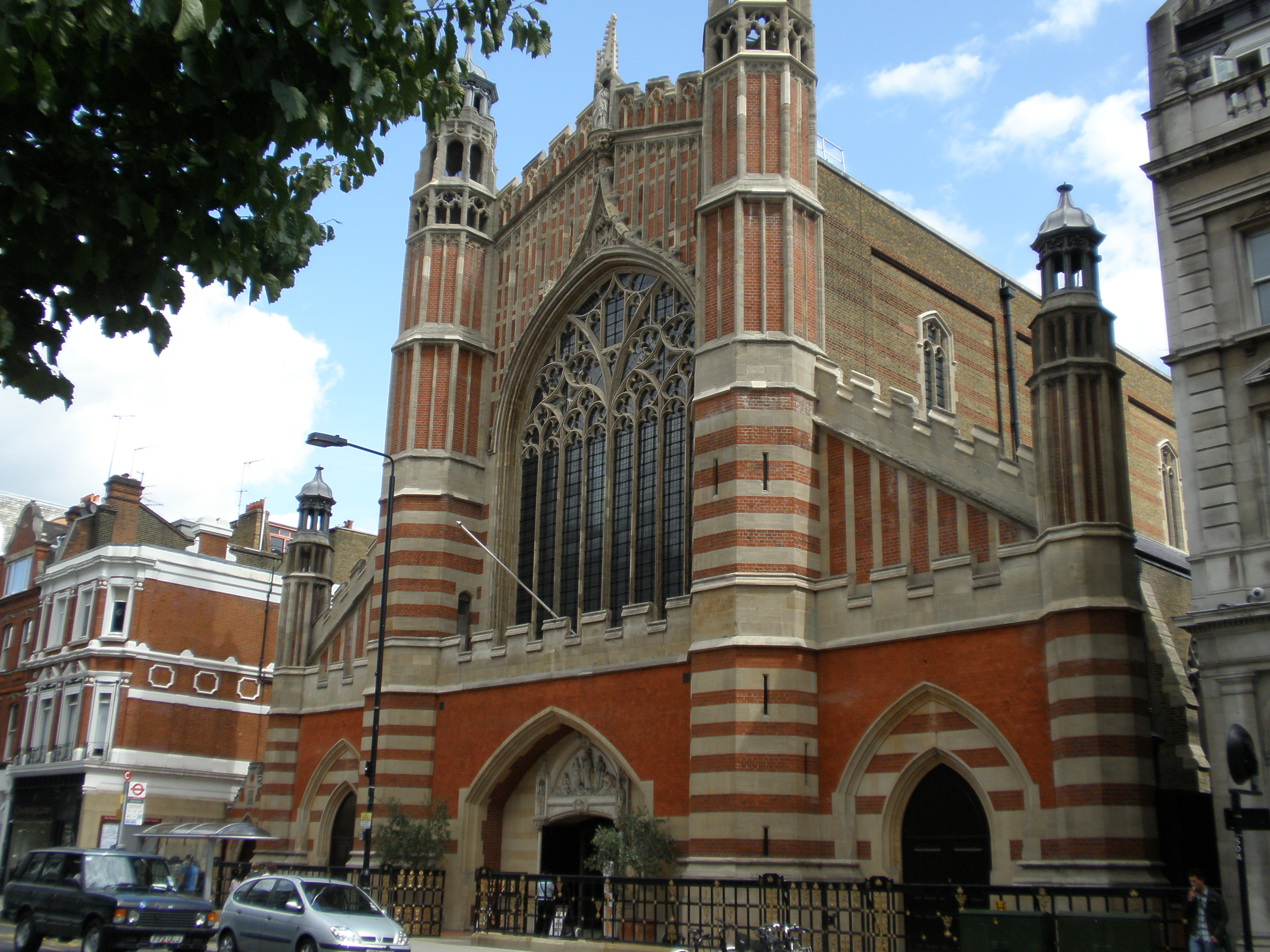
Holy Trinity, Sloane Street, Chelsea, which Sedding designed in the late 1880s

Sedding was born in 1838, at Eton in Berkshire. He was the son of a village schoolmaster, who spent much of his youth in Derbyshire. He was 15 when "The Nature of Gothic" first appeared in John Ruskin's Stones of Venice (1853). In 1858, like William Morris, Philip Webb and Norman Shaw before him, Sedding became a pupil of the Gothic Revival architect, George Edmund Street (1824–1881). His elder brother, Edmund Sedding, had also trained as an architect with Street. Street had studied in the office of Sir Gilbert Scott (1811–1878), and his own practice was a cradle of the Arts and Crafts Movement.

Sedding left Street in 1863 and by about 1865 he had joined his brother Edmund Sedding, who had set up as an architect in Penzance, Cornwall. The brothers shared an interest in church music, and Edmund is remembered as the composer of the music for the hymn, Jerusalem the Golden. Edmund suffered from tuberculosis and died young in 1868.

Sedding moved first to Bristol, and then to London, though he always retained an affection for Cornwall, the West Country and country life. One of his first churches was the Anglo-Catholic St Martin's at Marple in Cheshire completed in 1872. The interior was designed by William Morris with contributions from Dante Gabriel Rossetti, Ford Madox Brown, Edward Burne-Jones and William Holman Hunt.

Sedding married Rose Catherine Tinling on 6 February 1872 in Gloucester Cathedral. She was the daughter of the Rev. Edward Douglas Tinling and Katherine Maria Elton.

In 1873 Sedding designed St Clements Church Boscombe, Bournemouth, now a Grade One listed church. The reredos, high altar, candlesticks, church plate, pulpit, lectern, choir stalls, encaustic tiles, statue of St Clement and rood screen were all designed by Sedding.

In 1875, he was elected a fellow of the Royal Institute of British Architects and moved from Bristol to set up in practice in London the following year, taking offices on the upper floors of 447 Oxford Street, next door to the premises of Morris & Co.

In 1876 Sedding met Ruskin under whose influence he developed a freer Gothic style, introducing natural ornament into his designs. Sedding encouraged his students to study old buildings at first hand, focusing on the practicalities of craft techniques. He placed an emphasis on texture and ornament; the naturalistic treatment of flowers, leaves and animals, always drawn from life; and the close involvement of the architect in the simple processes of building and in the supervision of a team of craftsmen employed direct. He was elected a member of the Art Workers Guild in 1884, the year of its foundation, and was elected as its second master in 1886.

== Buildings and church work ==
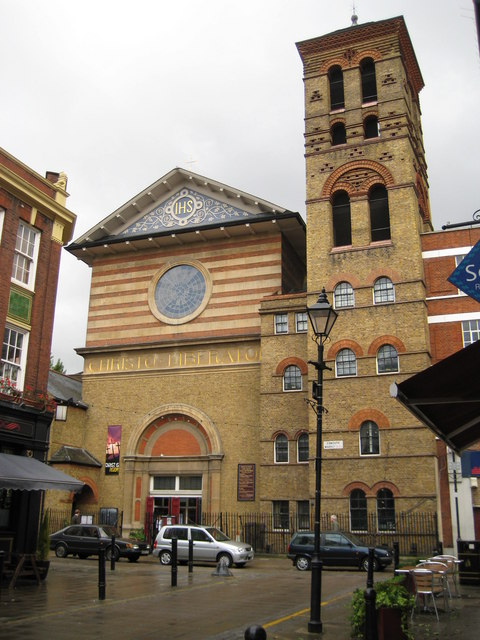
Church of Our Most Holy Redeemer, Exmouth Market

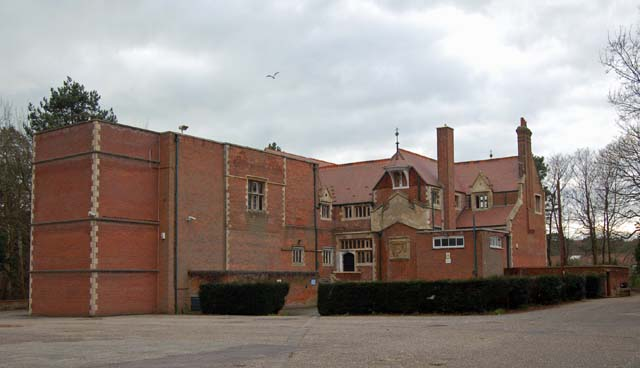
The Knole, now Freemasons' Hall, Knole Road, Boscombe

Sedding's buildings include the London churches of St Augustine of Canterbury, Highgate, London N6 (1884, completed by others), Our Most Holy Redeemer, Clerkenwell (1887; in Italianate style), St Peter's Church, Ealing (1889) and Holy Trinity Sloane Street (begun in 1888 and completed by his pupil Henry Wilson), which Sir John Betjeman described as "the cathedral of the Arts and Crafts Movement", although much of the decoration Sedding intended was not carried out.

His other churches include St Clement's, Boscombe, Dorset (1871–73), and those at Holbeton and Ermington in Devon as well as the Church of St. Peter & St. Paul in Edgefield, Norfolk and St Elwyn's (1886–88) at Hayle in Cornwall. At All Saints' Church, Falmouth (1887–90), he unconventionally combined tall round-arched arcades with Gothic windows. He also gained a reputation in the West Country as a skilled repairer of old churches. His most notable work in the Bristol area is the so-called "House of Charity" (1890–5), with picturesque detailing. He added a new vestry to St Mary's Church, Stamford, in 1890, and was the architect of St Edward's Church in the Hampshire village of Netley Abbey and the 1870 Church of St Martin, Marple, Stockport.

He carried out restorations at St Levan's Church, St Levan and St John's Church, West Wickham, Kent; also St Mary's Church, Stogumber, Somerset in 1872–75.

He is noted for his many designs for church furnishings and plate, and contributed rich decorative features to numerous churches, such as screens at Axbridge, Somerset (1888) (with Art Nouveau-style detailing to the arches and lettering), and a reredos at St Saviour's, Walcot, Bath.

With Henry Wilson (who completed the work on Sedding's death), he was commissioned by 6th Duke of Portland to create an extension to Welbeck Abbey to link the old building with the Riding School. He was also commissioned to build a Chapel, which was also completed by Wilson. Both buildings contain very fine Arts and Crafts design features including a St George and the Dragon moulding over the fireplace with the tail forming a frieze around the room and magnificent bronze door to the chapel and a particularly fine font and altar table.

== Death ==
Sedding died on 7 April 1891, at Winsford in Somerset. There is a memorial on the north wall of the Lady Chapel of Holy Trinity Sloane Street. He was buried in the churchyard of St John's Church, West Wickham. His wife, Rose, died a few weeks after him.

== Selected publications ==
- Garden-craft Old and New (1891; repr. 1903)
- Art and Handicraft (1893)

== Notes, references and sources ==
Notes and references

Sources

- Pevsner, Nikolaus (1970). Cornwall. The Buildings of England (2nd ed.). Harmondsworth: Penguin Books.
