= Cooper Reef =

Artificial reef near Esperance, Western Australia

Cooper Reef, also called the Esperance Nearshore Artificial Reef, is a purpose-built artificial reef in Esperance, Western Australia. Completed in 2019, the reef was designed in collaboration with Recfishwest and artificial reef specialists at Subcon, and built with the help of local volunteers. It was constructed to attract fish and enhance fish stocks, thereby creating new fishing and recreation opportunities for tourists, anglers and local families. Graham Cooper, who is the South East Coast Recreational Fishing Council president, Esperance Deep Sea Angling Club member, and local fishing safety educator, was the driving force behind the reef and the reason it got its name.

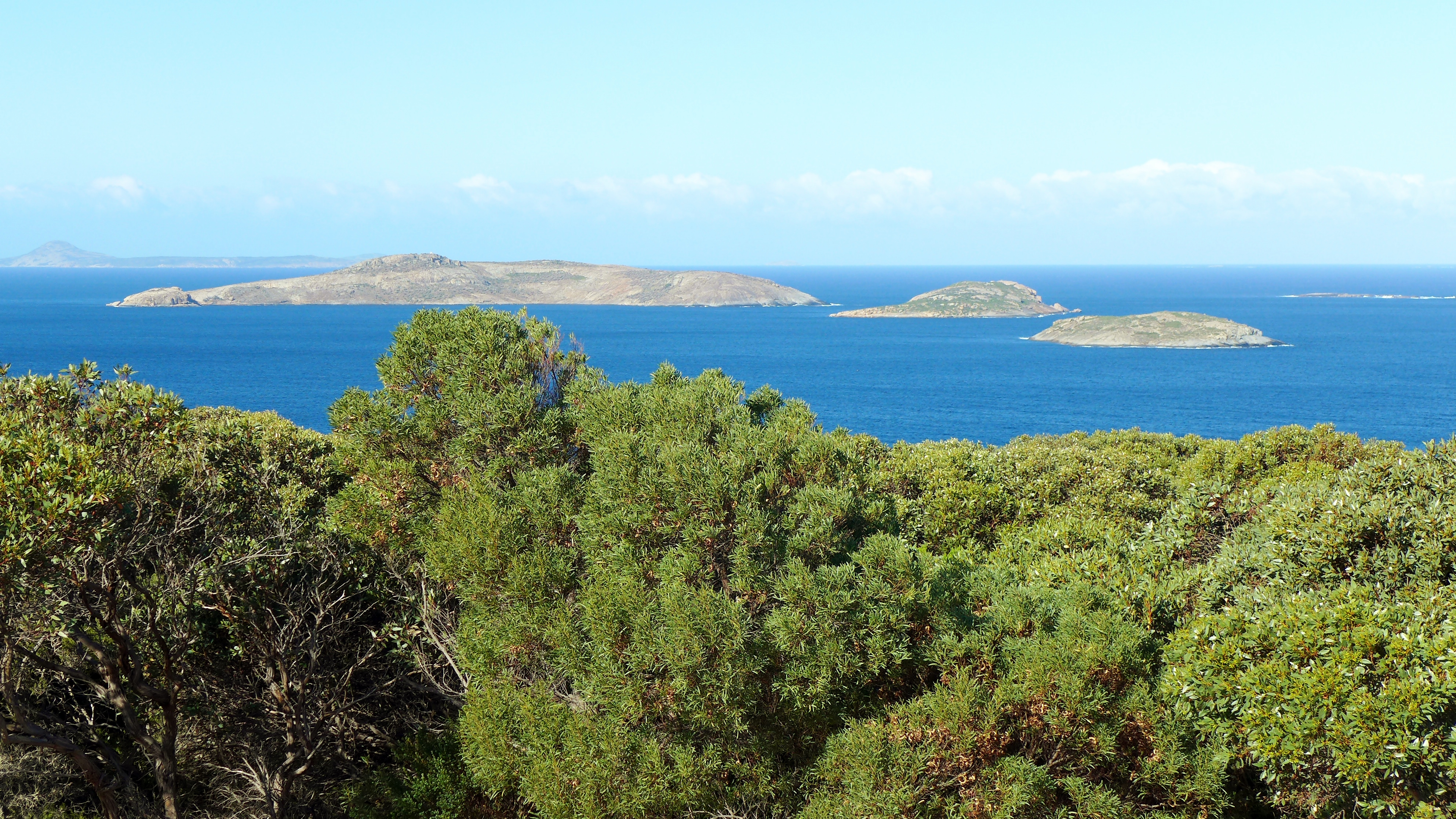
Cooper Reef is located in the Recherche Archipelago off Esperance, Western Australia

== Location ==
Cooper Reef is located in the Recherche Archipelago, approximately five kilometres from the Bandy Creek Boat Harbour in Esperance, Western Australia, which is a popular deep-sea fishing location. Esperance has a Mediterranean climate with high wave energy, and is influenced by the Leeuwin Current which flows southward around Western Australia.

The bay is sheltered by the 105 islands comprising the archipelago. The marine habitat consists of sandy bottoms interspersed with seagrass and kelp beds, and dotted with granite islands and reefs. It is a unique habitat rich in biodiversity, supporting productive ecosystems and large populations of pelagic finfish.

Cooper Reef's geographic coordinates are 33°52′15″S 121°58′50″E.

== History ==
The following is an approximate timeline of the development of Cooper Reef:

- 2012 - Idea proposed by Graham Cooper
- 2012 to 2017 - Research, requesting permits
- 2017 - Habitat mapping begins, potential site identified
- 2018 to 2019 - Early baseline monitoring, site approved by Commonwealth Department of the Environment and Energy
- 2019 - Reef deployed in January

== Design and build process ==
=== Purpose ===
Artificial reefs are being increasingly used as a way to help mitigate human impacts on natural ecosystems. Cooper Reef was designed to enhance fish stocks and attract select species that are prized by anglers, thereby providing safe and accessible fishing opportunities for tourists and the local community.

Targeted species include pelagic finfish like pink and queen snapper, nannygai, breaksea cod, samson fish, whiting and tuna. The reef will also encourage demersal (groundfish) and other benthic species including flathead, crustaceans, clams, soft corals and even common seadragons by sheltering them and supporting the food web and overall health of the local marine ecosystem.

=== Site selection ===
Habitat mapping methodology was developed specifically to help scientists find a suitable site for the reef's deployment as existing maps were insufficient. A grid-based system was used in which cameras were deployed at 24 intersecting reference points over a two-month period. The cameras, mounted on custom-built frames, were deployed by local fishermen to survey existing fish populations and the composition of the sea floor. Results of the surveys were then analyzed by scientists and the footage was further validated using towed underwater cameras. Surveyed sites consisted of either bare sand or beds of seagrass. Proposed locations were then compared with other control sites, including those with bare sandy seafloor and natural reefs, with the final site being chosen as it displayed the desired habitat qualities and water depth.

An additional factor considered when choosing the reef's location was accessibility and safety for fishermen. As the reef is close to two major boat harbours and is not influenced by existing reefs, the location may also aid in mitigating the need for sea search and rescue operations, as more fishermen will be able to fish in a place that is easily accessible and close to shore.

=== Design ===
Cooper Reef covers a total 11,400 square meters of ocean floor and rests some 30 meters underwater. It was designed by engineers and marine biologists to fulfil its purpose as a species-targeting fisheries enhancing tool. The structure, building material and placement of the modules were all carefully considered. Marine-grade concrete was chosen as the construction material as it is easy to source and easy to mold to the desired shape. It is stable underwater due to its heavy weight, enabling the reef to withstand a 1 in 100-year storm event without shifting or crumbling. It is also pH balanced and non-toxic, and as its texture is similar to rock it provides the perfect surface for colonizing organisms to become established.

Three different module designs were used, each featuring a dome-like structure pocketed with a number of holes and cave-like cavities. The domes create natural shadows that are attractive to certain species and they alter hydrological conditions around the structures, creating upwellings that support plankton and small prey items and attracting fish while also protecting fish from current flow. The cave-like openings also mimic the natural rocky habitats found in the archipelago.

A total of 128 modules were built and these were arranged in six clusters with hydrology, reef connectivity, and edge effects all influencing the final layout in combination with the reef's desired purpose.

=== Construction ===
The project was funded by recreational fishing license money, with $300,000 each coming from the Recreational Fishing Initiatives Fund and the Goldfields Esperance Development Commission for a total cost of nearly $600,000. As construction materials were sourced locally, the reef helped support local businesses, and much of the labour, particularly in the pouring of the concrete modules, was provided by local volunteers.

== Community response ==
The community's response to the project was positive. Local businesses donated bait and supplies to aid in reef monitoring efforts; volunteers from the Heart & Soul men's shed in Perth donated their time and expertise to construct the 15 underwater video system units used by surveyors; and members of the Esperance community, including those from the Volunteer Marine Rescue and Esperance Deep Sea Angling Club, contributed to data collection, site surveys, reef monitoring and concrete pouring, with many of them receiving training to deploy, operate and retrieve cameras and take samples. This "citizen science" approach contributes to creating feelings of ownership of the project, and encourages stewardship of the unique local environment and its resources.

== Monitoring ==
In addition to the scientific site monitoring mentioned above, a citizen science approach is being taken to monitor how the deployed reef progresses. Local volunteers were gathered through traditional media, social media, tackle shops, fishing clubs and sea rescue organizations. Potential volunteers were then screened through short surveys intended to verify the suitability of their boats. Following screening, selected volunteers were given information and training through workshops held at the Esperance Deep Sea Angling Club and Volunteer Marine Rescue to install baited underwater video cameras at the reef location when they embark on fishing trips. They then submit the collected video footage to scientists who analyze it.

This "citizen science" approach is part of Recfishwest's Reef Vision program, a world-first in utilizing local expert knowledge in collaboration with scientists to collect data and monitor the local ecosystem. Not only is this essential for environmental impact and performance monitoring to determine if the reef is meeting its intended goals, but it also increases community and media interest in the reef which is important for fostering stewardship of valuable local resources.

== Current situation ==
Following the reef's deployment in January 2019, there was an increase in the number of species observed around and interacting with the reef structure, including 41 different species of fish, rays and seadragons. This is an increase from baseline observations of 15 species before deployment, and reflects patterns seen at similar artificial reef sites around the country. Fishermen and scientists continue to monitor the reef to ensure its integrity and confirm it is fulfilling its intended purpose.

== Awards ==
In 2019, the Esperance Deep Sea Angling Club received an award at the WA Awards for Excellence in the "Best Projects" category for the construction of the reef and its contribution to fishing and tourism in Western Australia.

== Similar reefs ==
Australia is home to approximately 150 artificial reefs, with purpose-built reefs becoming more and more common. The design of Cooper Reef was modified by existing research from similar reefs located in Dunsborough, Bunbury, Mandurah, Exmouth and near Rottnest Island.
