= Chevron Reef =

- Location within the Los Angeles metropolitan area Location within California Location within Pacific Ocean

Location
- Location: Pacific Ocean
- Coordinates: 33.915123°N 118.432624°W
- Country: United States

Geology
- Type: artificial reef

Chevron Reef, also known as Pratte's Reef, was an artificial reef constructed in 2000 in Santa Monica Bay, offshore from Dockweiler State Beach. It was the first artificial surfing reef in the United States and was the second to be built worldwide. It was removed in 2008.

== Location ==
The reef was located about 100 yards offshore in 15 feet of water, north of the El Segundo jetty and 200 yards south of the Hyperion sewage treatment plant 1-mile outfall, known locally as "Shitpipe".

== History ==
In 1984, the California Coastal Commission approved a proposed 900-foot jetty to protect a marine terminal and underwater pipelines at a Chevron facility in El Segundo, California. The Surfrider Foundation fought the decision and an agreement was made that the company would pay $300,000 to build an artificial surfing reef if it could be proved that the jetty caused a substantial decrease in surfable waves.

Research demonstrating the jetty's negative effect on surf quality was completed in 1994, but Chevron paid out the $300,000 only in 1999. Plans proceeded and the reef was dubbed Pratte's Reef in honor of Surfrider co-founder Thomas Pratte, who had been influential in fighting the Chevron jetty approval and died in 1994. In the fall of 2000, 110 geotextile bags were dropped into the water to create the artificial reef. It did not have as much of an effect as hoped and an additional $200,000 grant from the California Coastal Conservancy was secured to fund adding another 90 bags at the site in spring 2001.

In retrospect, the reef was not large enough to focus the swells into nicely breaking waves. Surfrider environmental director Chad Nelsen said in an interview that "when the surf gets big, it breaks outside the reef" but noted that the reef used the greatest volume of sand it could within budget constraints. Beginning in 2008, the reef was removed as required by its permit.
