= Boscombe =

Suburb of Bournemouth, England

Coordinates: 50.725°N 1.840°W

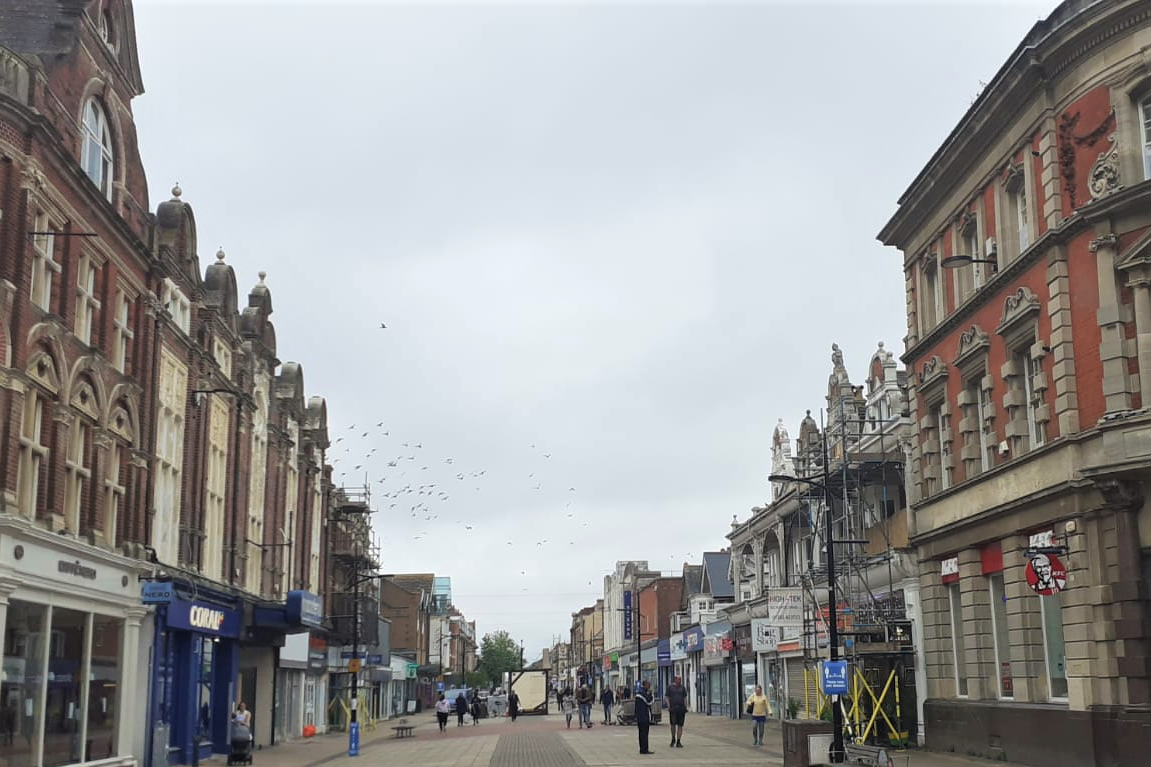
- Boscombe High Street

- Location within Dorset
- Population: 20,719 (2 wards, 2011)
- OS grid reference: SZ115920
- Unitary authority: Bournemouth, Christchurch and Poole
- Ceremonial county: Dorset
- Region: South West
- Country: England
- Sovereign state: United Kingdom
- Post town: BOURNEMOUTH
- Postcode district: BH1, BH5
- Dialling code: 01202
- Police: Dorset
- Fire: Dorset and Wiltshire
- Ambulance: South Western
- UK Parliament: Bournemouth East

Boscombe (/ˈbɒskəm/) is a suburb in Bournemouth, England. Historically in Hampshire, but today in Dorset, it is located to the east of Bournemouth town centre and west of Southbourne.

Originally a sparsely inhabited area of heathland, from around 1865 Boscombe developed rapidly from a small village into a seaside resort alongside Bournemouth. Its first pier opened in 1889.

There are numerous architectural styles within the town, ranging from the elaborate Victorian style of the Royal Arcade and St Clement's Church, notable examples of Art Deco such as the former Gas & Water Company store at 709 Christchurch Road, and the modernist 1950s styles of the pier and Overstrand buildings. Alongside these are modern flats developments such as The Reef, The Point (sometimes called the Pointer by some residents) and Honeycombe Beach.

The nickname Bos Vegas has gained popularity in recent years and occurs with slight spelling variation in the names of two Boscombe businesses.

Boscombe is home to AFC Bournemouth, who play at Dean Court. Many fans still refer to AFC Bournemouth as Boscombe, a reference to the original names of Boscombe St John's and Bournemouth & Boscombe Athletic FC (the word Boscombe was dropped in 1972).

There is a street market in the High Street on Thursdays and Saturdays as well as a vintage market on the first Saturday of every month.

== Geography and administration ==
The area upon which Boscombe is situated, between the somewhat older village of Pokesdown and Bournemouth Square, was part of the great heathland which covered much of western Hampshire, and extended well into eastern Dorset. From Norman times it was within the Liberty of Westover. From the beach and cliffs the whole of Poole Bay stretching from Hengistbury Head in the east to Poole Harbour entrance in the west, and on to Studland and Swanage bays to the south can be seen.

Boscombe was originally an independent settlement, separated from Bournemouth by dense wood and moorland, it was incorporated into the boundaries of Bournemouth in 1876 (against the wishes of Boscombe residents).

== History ==
In 1273 a reference is made to "Boscumbe", suggesting that the name may have derived from the Old English words meaning a 'valley overgrown with spiky plants'; perhaps a reference to gorse.

Boscombe is mentioned in Christopher Saxton's 1574 survey of possible enemy landing places on the coast of Hampshire: "Bournemouth within the west baye at Christchurch...We finde more a place called Bastowe within the said Baye". Saxton's map of 1575 shows a Copperas House at Bascomb, which refers to the manufacture of copperas or ferrous sulphate which took place in the district, particularly in the last quarter of the 16th century.

At the beginning of the 19th century, Boscombe was described as an extensive common covered with furze and heath, more the haunt of smugglers than anyone else. One of the early landmarks was the 'Ragged Cat', a wayside inn dating from 1850, later renamed the 'Palmerston' and then 'Deacons', it was renamed back to 'The Ragged Cat' in 2009 before being closed down. In 2015 a Polish market was opened in this historic building.

=== Boscombe Manor ===
In 1801, a modestly-sized house called Boscombe Cottage was built as the residence of Mr Phillip Norris. The Christchurch Inclosures Act 1802 increased the estate size to 17 acres (6.9 ha). This property became the nucleus of the Boscombe Manor Estate.

The large estate owned by Mr Norris changed hands several times during the first half of the 19th century. After Norris's death it was acquired by Robert Heathcote, and on his death the estate was put up for auction The estate was purchased by James Dover, in whose possession it remained until 1841; then it was sold to Major Stephenson.

Stevenson sold the estate in 1849 to Sir Percy Shelley, 3rd Baronet, who bought the Boscombe property mainly with the intention of it becoming a home for his mother Mary Shelley, but she died in London on 1 February 1851. Sir Percy and his wife liked the place, and decided to make it their home, dividing their time between Boscombe and their London house at Chelsea.

The house at Boscombe was extensively rebuilt for Sir Percy, and extended to include a 200-seat (later 300 seats) theatre, to the designs of Christopher Crabb Creeke, who later became surveyor to the Bournemouth Improvement Commissioners and was responsible for both the layout of much of central Bournemouth's roads, and for several local buildings.

It may be noted that the name of Boscombe Manor changed several times over the years. First recorded as Boscombe Cottage, it was then for a time called Boscombe Alcove and then Boscombe Lodge. By Shelley's time it was Boscombe House, and he and his family later renamed it Boscombe Manor. In the present century it was Groveley Manor for many years, taking the name of the school which then occupied it, but now it is known as Shelley Park, most of the building being taken up by the Shelley Manor Medical Centre in Beechwood Avenue.

To supplement the existing plantations of pine trees on the estate, Sir Percy added a large number of deciduous trees. There was a drive to the house from the main Christchurch Road, which followed the line of the present Chessel Avenue, and there was a lodge at its entrance. A second entry was from Sea Road, along a roadway flanked with lime trees – the present Percy Road.

By the beginning of the 1860s Boscombe consisted of the Shelley estate and some cottages, one of which is known to have stood at the top of Boscombe Hill, near the present Drummond Road.

From 1865 the development and expansion of the area to the end of the 19th century, and beyond, was very rapid. Starting with a proposal by the Malmesbury Estate to develop the 'picturesque Village of Boscombe Spa' to make available building plots for the erection of marine villas to be let on long leases.

The Spa was related to a natural spring of mineral water containing properties, similar to Harrogate, which had been discovered near the foot of the hill; this would be available for invalids and could combine the advantages of a Spa with those of sea air and bathing.

The scheme was not implemented; instead about 19 acres (77,000 m^{2}) of land was obtained by Sir Henry Drummond Wolff, on part of which he built a house for himself named Boscombe Towers, in 1868. Sir Henry became closely associated with the development of Boscombe Spa for a considerable number of years. Wolff sought to develop 'Boscombe Spa' as a resort to rival Bournemouth and it was he who created the Boscombe Chine Gardens. In order to encourage the taking of the mineral water from the spring at the mouth of the Chine, a small thatched-roof building resembling a summer house was erected over the spring, and for a time this became a fashionable meeting place. The Chine itself was partially laid out and a broad pathway provided. A rustic bridge was constructed across the Chine.

The census of 1871 showed that there was a population of 212 people in 19 houses in the Boscombe Estate, and a further 70 people in 9 houses at Boscombe Spa. During the 1870s development of Boscombe was such that the population at the census of 1881 had grown to 1,895 – a more than sixfold increase.

=== Expansion ===
In 1875 a 160,000 gallon water tower was built in Palmerston Road, at this time it was stated that there were 244 houses in Boscombe. In February 1877 the Royal Boscombe Hospital (later called the Royal Victoria Hospital) opened in Shelley Road, it initially had beds for 12 patients. In 1880 Boscombe Land Society was formed purchasing 13 acres of land in November 1881. This was in the area of the present Knole Road, there were initially 73 plots. Much of the Shelley property in the area to the east of Sea Road was developed in the next ten years amounting to a further 70 plots. In 1883 Pokesdown station opened on the LSWR Brockenhurst to Bournemouth line. In 1889 Boscombe Pier opened (see below). The commercial centre of Boscombe had a major boost with projects by Archibald Beckett including blocks of shops, the Salisbury Hotel, the Royal Arcade, and a Grand Theatre, which was to become Boscombe Hippodrome, then the Royal Ballrooms and today the O2 Academy. These were all built between 1888 and 1895, shortly after opening in 1892 the Royal Arcade was lit by electricity. On 29 May 1897 Boscombe railway station was opened. On 19 August 1893 the Burlington Hotel opened; it was designed in an Italian Renaissance style and had 200 bedrooms. By the turn of the century the remainder of the Shelley estate had been sold, Boscombe Chine gardens had been laid out and there was little remaining vacant land within Boscombe. Before her death in June 1899 Lady Shelley had gifted four acres of land which were laid out to form Boscombe Cliff Gardens. In the 1901 census the population was 9,648.

=== 20th century ===
St John the Evangelist's parish church, designed by John Oldrid Scott and C. T. Miles and built in 1893–1895

The coronation of King Edward VII and his Queen, Alexandra of Denmark was scheduled to take place on 26 June 1902; to mark the occasion, Bournemouth Council agreed on 20 May 1902 to rename common No 59 as "King's Park". Boscombe thrived with the growth of the English seaside holiday. Between the World Wars, Boscombe was one of Bournemouth's wealthiest areas with many large Victorian and Edwardian family houses. In 1935, construction started on San Remo Towers, a block of 164 flats designed by Hector Hamilton in a Los Angeles Spanish style. Post-war there was a boom in the seaside holiday market, and Boscombe with its large number of smaller guest houses enjoyed this period of prosperity. In 1965, Boscombe railway station closed.

In the 1970s and 1980s, with the decline in the traditional English holiday market, Boscombe's fortunes began to wane. Many of the small guest houses and large family houses became houses in multiple occupation. A 2006 report for Bournemouth Council stated:

"By the 1970s this transition in character was attracting vulnerable people, people on low incomes and those in receipt of benefits to the area ... With this increase in less affluent, vulnerable people came an increase in transience in the population, a more 'chaotic' environment in Boscombe and the beginnings of a drug using community in the area. This was coupled with a large influx of workers from Liverpool including drug users and dealers to Bournemouth in the 1970s. Bournemouth was becoming an importer of people with drug and alcohol problems, and the drugs market expanded around these circumstances. By the 1980s this was being further stimulated by the setting up and proliferation of treatment centres for drug misuse."

Boscombe saw an increase in social problems during this period with drug and alcohol dependency levels well above the national average.

The Royal Bournemouth Hospital was opened in 1989 and replaced the Royal Victoria Hospital.

=== Recent history ===
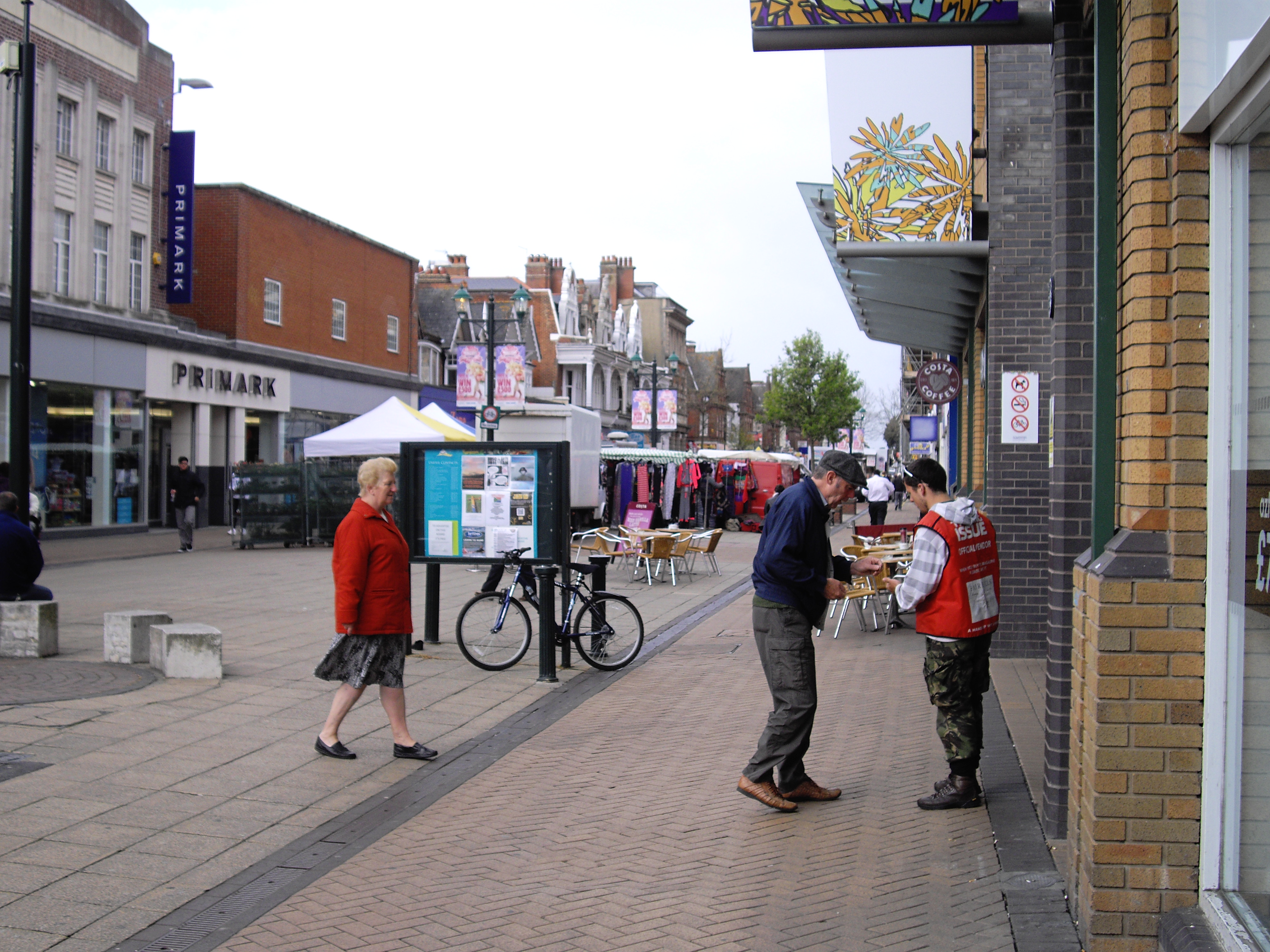
A man buying a copy of the Big Issue from a vendor in Boscombe precinct

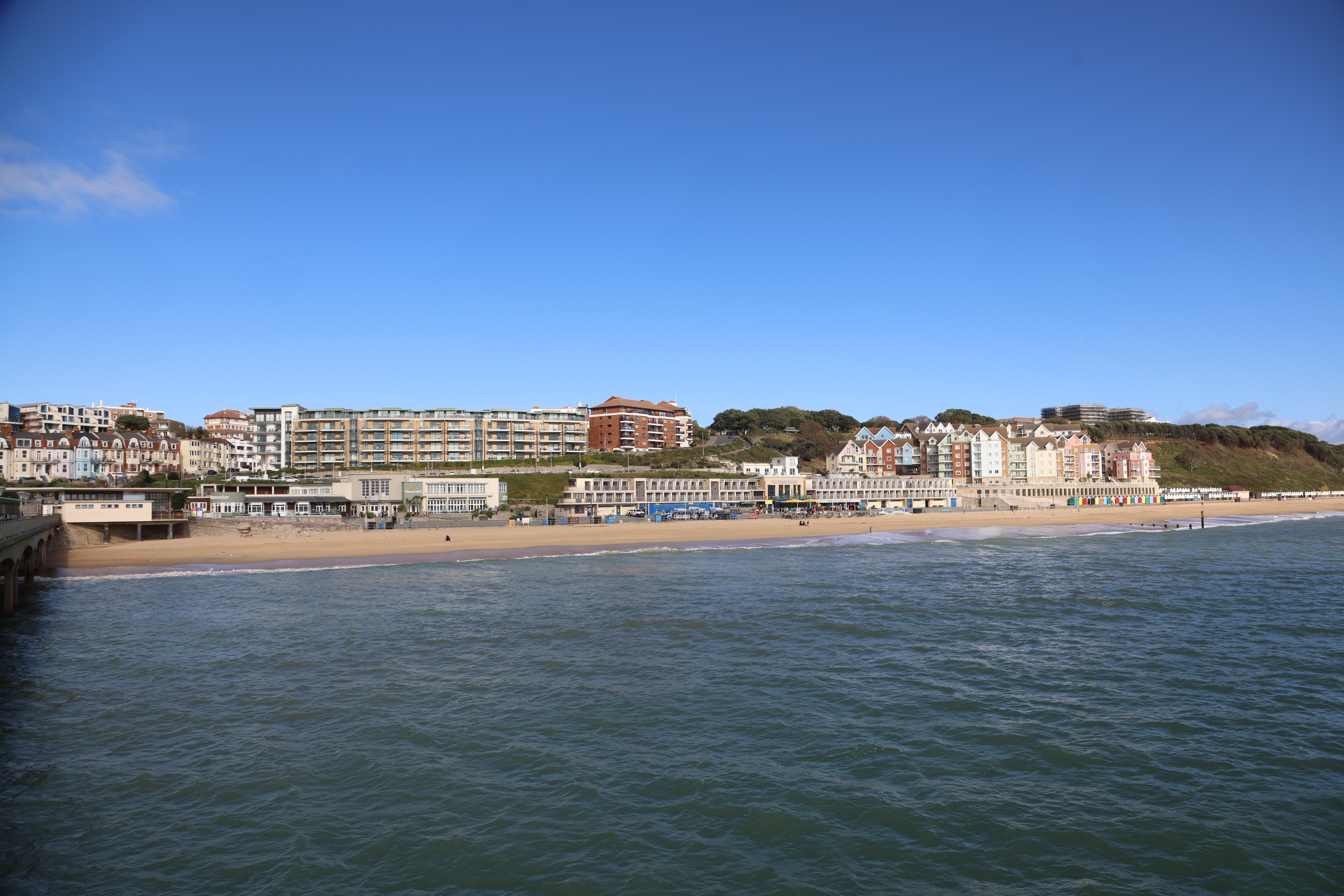
The seafront viewed from the pier

New development of the area around Boscombe was approved under the Boscombe Spa Development Plan in July 2006. This project was intended to turn the seafront into a spa village complete with artificial surf created by Boscombe Surf Reef. Completed in autumn 2009, the reef was constructed as part of the restoration work that also included the Overstrand buildings. Reports on the reef's performance showed that it was failing to meet its performance criteria. In 2011, the reef was closed for safety reasons; in 2012 the contractor went out of business and in 2014 the reef was re-branded as a Coastal Activity Park. Funding for the development had been through the sale of the local seafront car park, to Barratt Homes for 169 seafront apartments, at Honeycombe Chine. As well as these flats there have been a number of other large developments of flats such as "The Reef" in Boscombe Spa Road and the renovation of Shelley Park into a medical centre and flats development.

In May 2007, for the first time, a property in Boscombe sold for £1 million. The property was a flat with views of the coast, and was the main headline in the Bournemouth Daily Echo. Boscombe gardens underwent a renovation project and was substantially remodelled; a public art trail was also installed around Boscombe as part of the renovation project. In 2019, the historic Cliff End Hotel was demolished after years of abandonment.

== Schools and arts centre ==
In the 1870s a small school attached to St Clement's Church was too small to meet the growing demand. Boscombe British school was established by Frederick Moser and Sir Percy Shelley, who laid the foundation stone at a site on Gladstone Road in 1878. The school was built in a Neo-Gothic style and opened in 1879; the Christchurch Times reported that it was "to be one of the most ornamental as well as useful buildings in Boscombe." Later, when transferred to the local authority, the school was renamed Boscombe County Primary School. The senior section of the school moved in 1940 to the newly built Boscombe Bilateral Secondary Modern (now King's Park Primary) on Ashley Road.

In 1960, local teacher Leslie Williams formed the Bournemouth Children's Theatre in the old school buildings, which later became the Drama Centre. Dame Sybil Thorndike became the patron of the centre and visited frequently. In the 1980s the Drama Centre was renamed the Bournemouth Centre for Community Arts (BCCA) to reflect its extension into other arts. Gareth Malone attended, later going on to be known as a choirmaster on BBC televised programmes. After it was closed in 2007 and under threat of demolition, the Friends of the BCCA contacted English Heritage to help save the building; it was Grade II listed in 2008. In June 2012, despite 938 objections, and claims the Planning Board had been "misled", planning permission was obtained to restore the listed rooms and to build 11 affordable homes for local people (10 houses and an accessible bungalow), a community orchard and allotments. Demolition took place in October 2013. A mock funeral was held by protesters hoping to stop the demolition.

The Religious of the Cross operated a Roman Catholic boarding and day convent school for girls, and later also a boys' preparatory school, built at 13, Parkwood Road in 1889. The school was subsequently extended to accommodate a separate junior school. This building has housed the Anglo-European College of Chiropractic since 1982.

Other schools in Boscombe are St James's Church of England Primary, Corpus Christi Catholic Primary (next to Corpus Christi Church), Bethany Primary, Avonbourne Girls Academy, and Avonbourne Boys Academy.

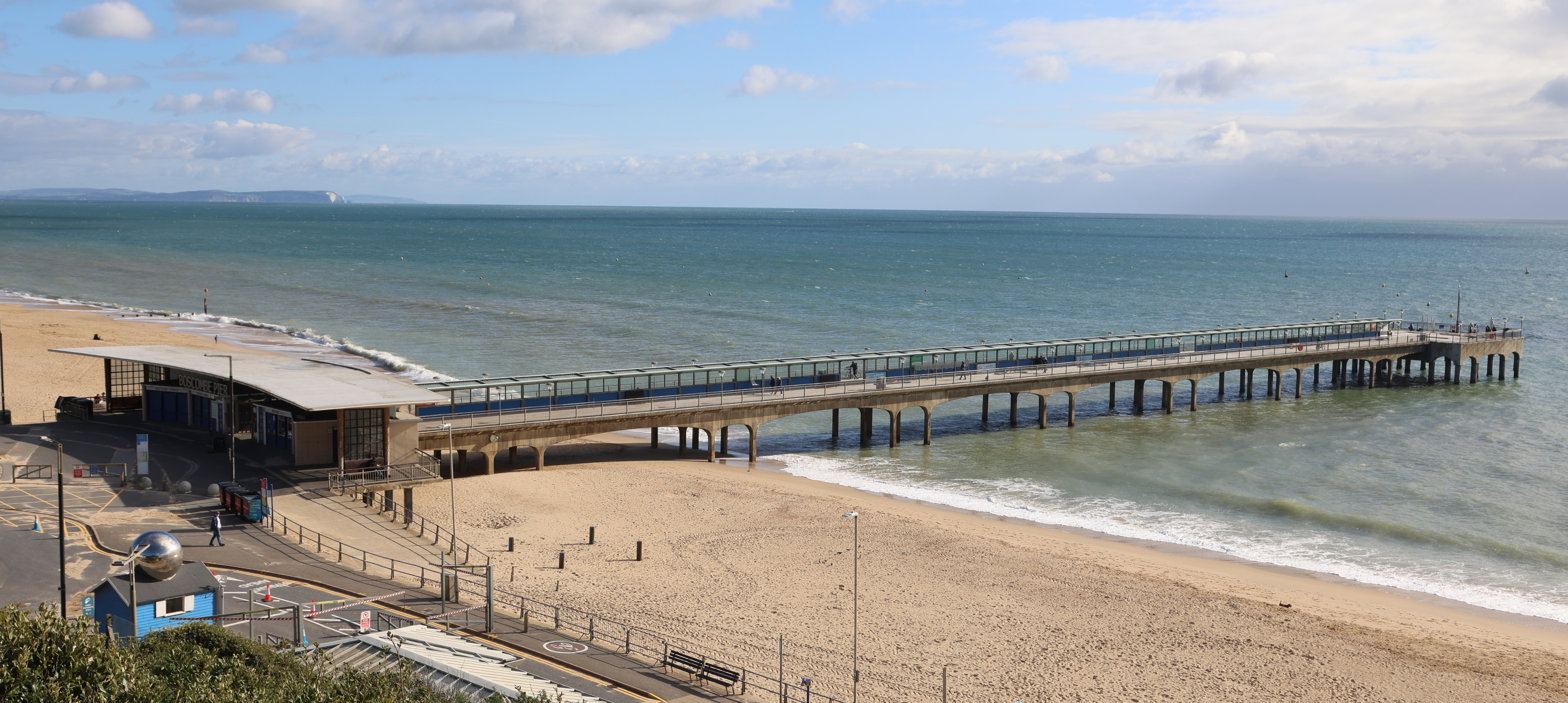
Boscombe Pier

== Boscombe Chine ==
Boscombe Chine, the ravine breaking through the sandy cliffs, comprised several small valleys draining the land around Boscombe. Several of these originated in Springbourne, but they all eventually confluenced near to Christchurch Road. The southern end of the chine was laid out as pleasure gardens with a surface water stream as a picturesque feature. Towards the foot of the Chine, near to Sea Road, a chalybeate spring was discovered, no doubt fed by the water draining into the chine. A small thatched hut was erected over the spring and was given the name Boscombe Spa. The water was sufficiently foul-tasting that people would make a special trip to drink the water for any health-giving properties that it may contain.

== Boscombe Pier ==
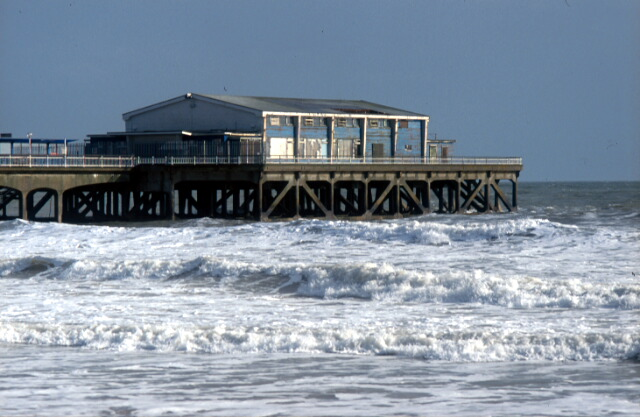
Boscombe Pier in 2003

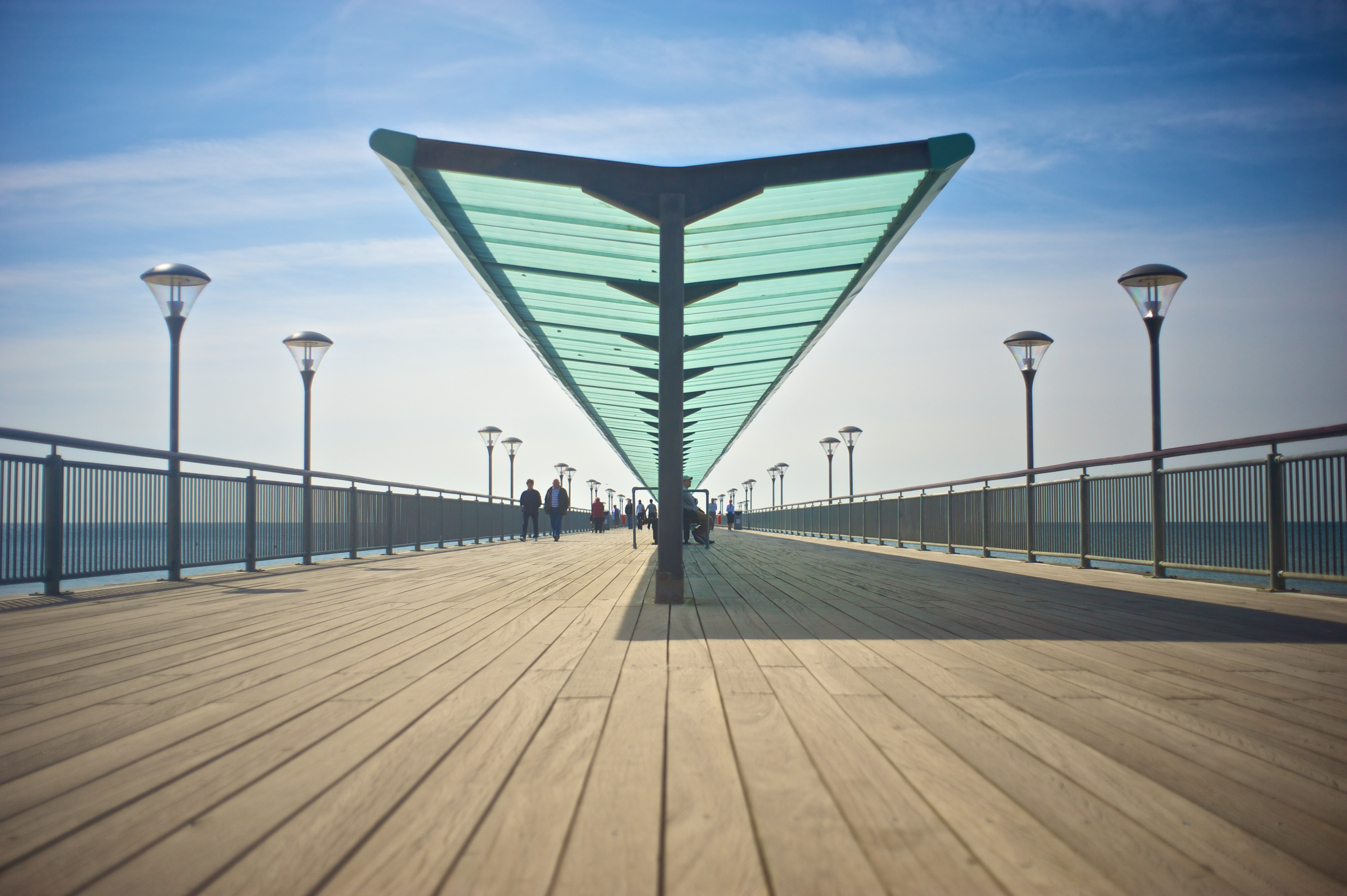
The pier in 2010, after restoration

Musical walkway installed in 2014

A pier was proposed in 1884 as a visitor attraction. The pier was authorised by the Boscombe Pier Order 1887, confirmed by the Pier and Harbour Order Confirmation (No. 2) Act 1887 (50 & 51 Vict. c. clviii). In September 1888 the contract for its building was awarded for £3,813, and for making the pier approach £938. The pier was 200 yards (180 m) long, and built in spans of 13 yards (12 m) each with a continuous wrought iron girder frame, which carried timber decking 11 yards (10 m) wide. The pier head was 40 yards (37 m) long and 13 yards (12 m) wide, with a landing stage on each side, at which excursion steamers could call. At the entrance were two toll houses with turnstiles. The architect for the pier construction was James Stuart Campbell McEwan-Brown (1870–1949). His family were originally from Kintyre, Argyll and were closely connected to the Duke of Argyll. It is no surprise therefore, that it was opened with considerable ceremony on 29 July 1889 by the Duke of Argyll.

The pier head was not added until 1926, and like most piers it was partially demolished during World War II to combat the threat of invasion. The pier remained derelict for a number of years and was only fully reopened in 1962. The borough architect, John Burton, designed the modernist 1950s style entrance building. This building was Grade II listed in 2004, The heritage minister said:

"The Neck Building at Boscombe Pier is a rarity amongst municipal entertainment structures of the period. It was designed with real conviction and flair. The vivacity of this structure clearly illustrates the revitalisation of the British Seaside Resort in the 1950s."

— Andrew McIntosh

The building at the pier end was initially reopened as the Mermaid Theatre and then a roller skating rink before becoming an amusement arcade. It closed in 1989 and the pier became progressively more derelict over the next 19 years.

On 31 October 2005 the pier was closed as it was deemed unsafe. The Grade II listed pier entrance building was externally restored in 2007 together with a restoration of the pier neck. New decking, lighting and central windbreak screen was added together with a new viewing and fishing platform end section, replacing the derelict Mermaid Amusement Hall. The pier re-opened in May 2008. To the east of the pier is Europe's first artificial surf reef.

Since the re-opening of the pier in 2008 a Friends Association has been established, organising art exhibitions and live music performances. In 2009, website Nothing To See Here named it "Britain’s coolest" and the National Piers Society voted it "Pier of the Year 2010".

In 2014, a musical walkway was added to the pier, featuring 88 custom-made chimes that play 'I Do Like To be Beside the Seaside' when struck in the correct order. The outdoor musical installation includes tubular bells, a bell lyre and tembos.

The pier also has its own dedicated angling club, The Boscombe Pier Sea Anglers, founded in 2002 for out of hours fishing.

Awards and achievements
| Preceded by Saltburn Pier | National Piers Society; Pier of the Year; 2010 | Succeeded by Grand Pier, Weston-super-Mare |

== The Boscombe Devil ==
The Boscombe Devil is a grotesque on a building facing the Boscombe Grand Theatre (now the O2 Academy), placed there in the 1920s by the Lord's Day Observance Society to show disapproval at the theatre's decision to open on Sundays.

== Politics ==
Boscombe is part of two wards for elections to Bournemouth, Christchurch and Poole Council which elect two councillors each; Boscombe East and Pokesdown and Boscombe West.

Boscombe is part of the Bournemouth East parliamentary constituency, for elections to the House of Commons of the United Kingdom.

== Notable people ==
- Pauline von Hügel (1858–1901), Italian-born Austrian baroness, British writer, founder of Corpus Christi Church, Boscombe
- Alex James (born 1968), English cheesemaker and bass guitarist for the rock band Blur
