= Artificial reef =

Human-made underwater structure that functions as a reef

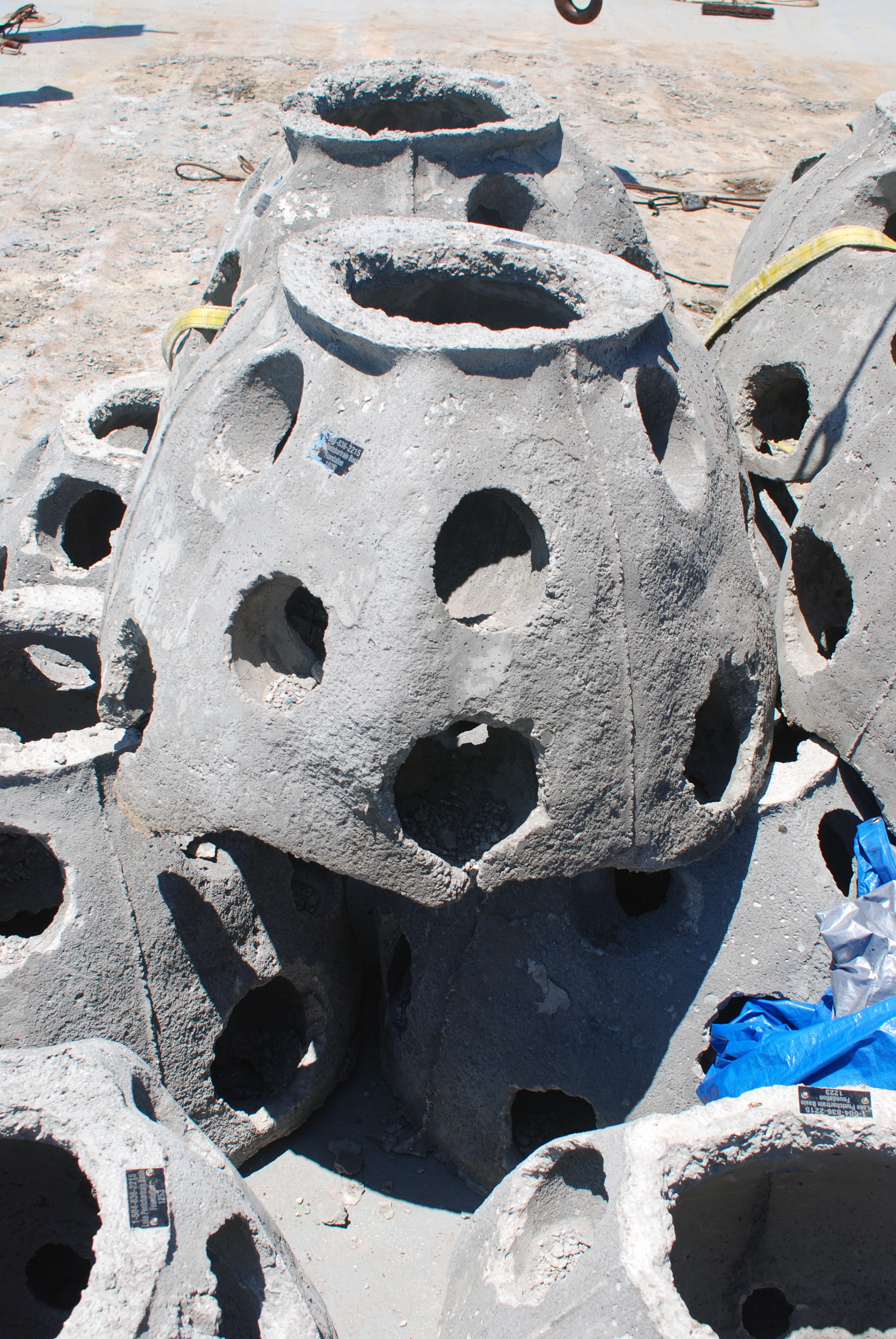
Reef balls are one type of structure used in the construction of artificial reefs.

An artificial reef (AR) is a human-created freshwater or marine benthic structure. Typically built in areas with a generally featureless bottom to promote marine life, it may be intended to control erosion, protect coastal areas, block ship passage, block the use of trawling nets, support reef restoration, improve aquaculture, or enhance scuba diving and surfing. Early artificial reefs were built by the Persians and the Romans.

An opportunity artificial reef is built from objects that were intended for other purposes, such as sinking oil rigs (through the Rigs-to-Reefs program), scuttling ships, or by deploying rubble or construction debris. Shipwrecks may become artificial reefs when preserved on the seafloor. A conventional artificial reef uses materials such as concrete, which can be molded into specialized forms (e.g. reef balls). Green artificial reefs incorporate renewable and organic materials such as vegetable fibres and seashells to improve sustainability and reduce energy consumption, pollution, and greenhouse gas emissions. In some cases, artificial reefs have been developed as artworks.

Artificial reefs generally provide hard surfaces where algae and invertebrates such as barnacles, corals, and oysters attach and spaces where different sizes of fishes can hide. The accumulation of attached marine life in turn provides intricate structures and food for assemblages of fish. The ecological impact of an artificial reef depends on multiple factors including where it is situated, how it is constructed, and the ages and types of species involved. While the artificial reefs allow for coral growth, it changes the ecosystem as the relative growth for different species is not always the same. Studies have found that macroalgal, cyanobacterial groups, and coral that are fast growing, grow in artificial reefs at different rates than they would grow in natural reefs.

Considerable research is being done into construction methods and the effects of artificial reefs. Many of the materials used early on are now considered undesirable. A 2001 literature review suggested that about half of the reefs studied met their objectives. Long-term planning and ongoing management were identified as essential factors in success. A more recent analysis of reefs world wide between 1990 and 2020 concludes that artificial reefs can be useful tools for restoring marine ecosystems if they are strategically designed to suit their specific location and its resource needs.

== History ==
The construction of artificial reefs began in ancient times. According to historian Diodorus Siculus, the Romans blocked the harbor of Lilybaeum during the First Punic War against the Carthaginians around 250 BC. They built an artificial reef "with stones and construction material" and put poles in the channels using "large timbers and anchors". Persians blocked the mouth of the Tigris River to thwart Arabian pirates by building an artificial reef.

Artificial reefs to increase fish yields or for algaculture began no later than 17th-century Japan, when rubble and rocks were used to grow kelp. The earliest recorded artificial reef in the United States is from the 1830s, when logs from huts were used off the coast of South Carolina to improve fishing. In the Philippines a traditional native fishing technique known as fish nests (natively known by various names like gango, amatong, or balirong), is basically an artificial reef. It uses rocks and waterlogged wood to build mounds inside excavated trenches on shallow tidal waters that attract fish and crustaceans. The mounds are then harvested every few weeks during low tide by surrounding them with nets and dismantling them piece by piece. They are rebuilt after every harvest. Fish nests are often used to capture grouper fingerlings to be used as seeds for aquaculture. Fish nests were in common use since before 1939.

Beginning before the 1840s, U.S. fishermen used interlaced logs to build artificial reefs. More recently, refuse such as old refrigerators, shopping carts, ditched cars and out-of-service vending machines replaced the logs in ad hoc reefs. Officially sanctioned projects have incorporated decommissioned ships, subway cars, battle tanks, armored personnel carriers, oil drilling rigs and beehive-like reef balls.

== Purposes ==
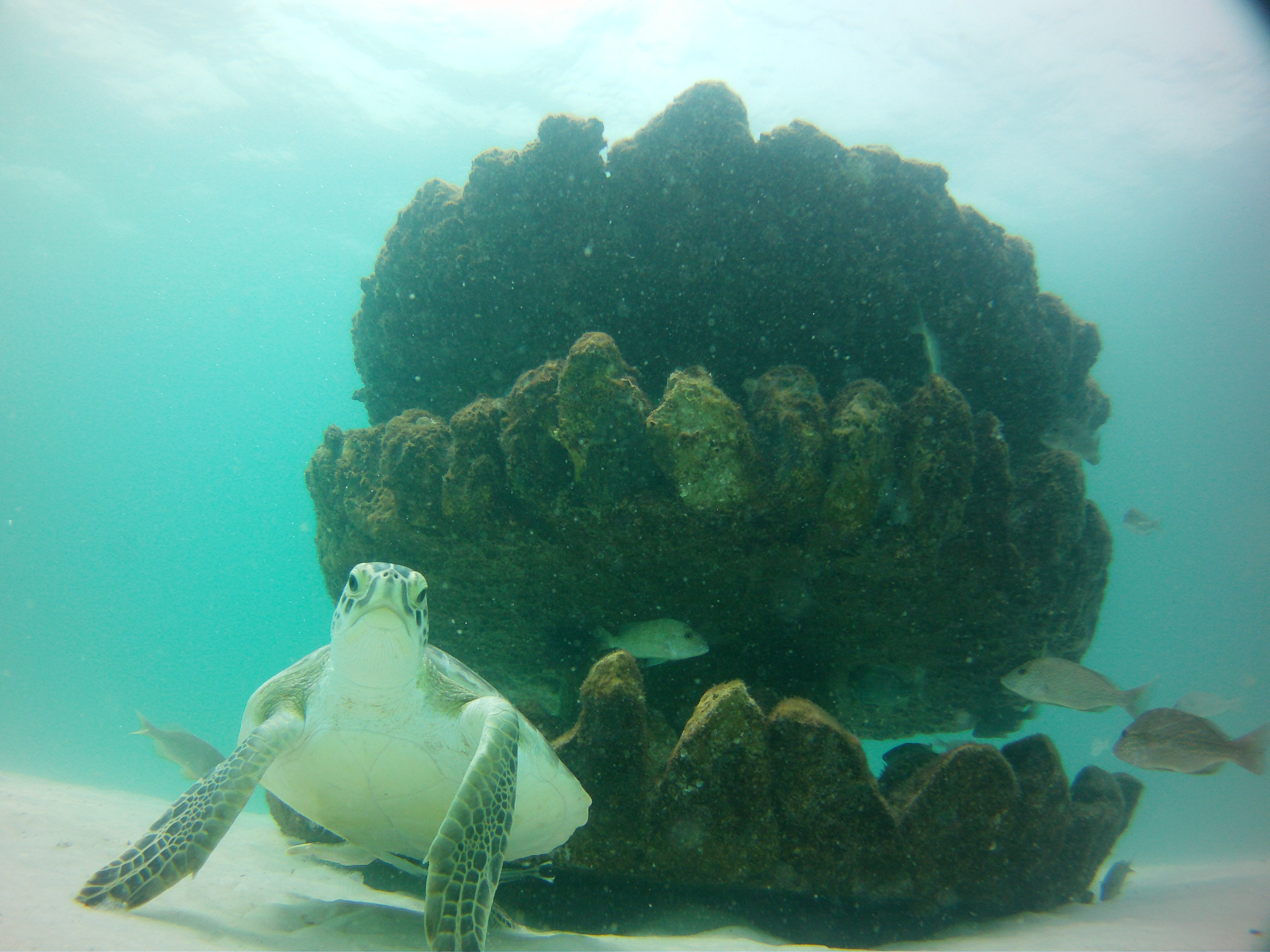
Artificial reefs can help increase biodiversity in an area.

Artificial reef structures (ARs) have a variety of intended uses, ranging from the protection, enhancement and restoration of marine ecosystems to the support of human activities like fishing, recreational diving and surfing. Artificial reefs can be used as active restoration tools to mitigate environmental damage and habitat loss, restore degraded ecosystems such as kelp forests and coral reefs, and promote biodiversity. In fisheries management, artificial reefs may be intended to increase production of species of recreational and commercial interest, enhance fishing yield, and support recreational, artisanal or commercial fisheries. They may be designed to protect benthic habitats from illegal trawling and restore fish stocks. They may be placed to protect against coastal erosion. They may also be developed to support eco-tourism, promote recreational activities like scuba diving and surfing, and mitigate tourism pressure on corals.

The design and construction of an artificial reef may be very different depending on its proposed location and intended goals. A reef that is designed for one purpose may be unsuitable for others. Early attempts to create artificial reefs frequently failed, or at best, met with mixed results. More recent reviews of work from 1990–2020 suggest that a correctly implemented artificial reef, designed to fit its target ecosystem, can be useful as a tool for the restoration of marine ecosystems. Reviewers call for better before/after and control comparisons of artificial and natural reefs, increased monitoring of reefs over their lifespan, and attention to the spatial orientation, complexity, and shape of reef substrate, among others.

=== Artificial reef communities ===
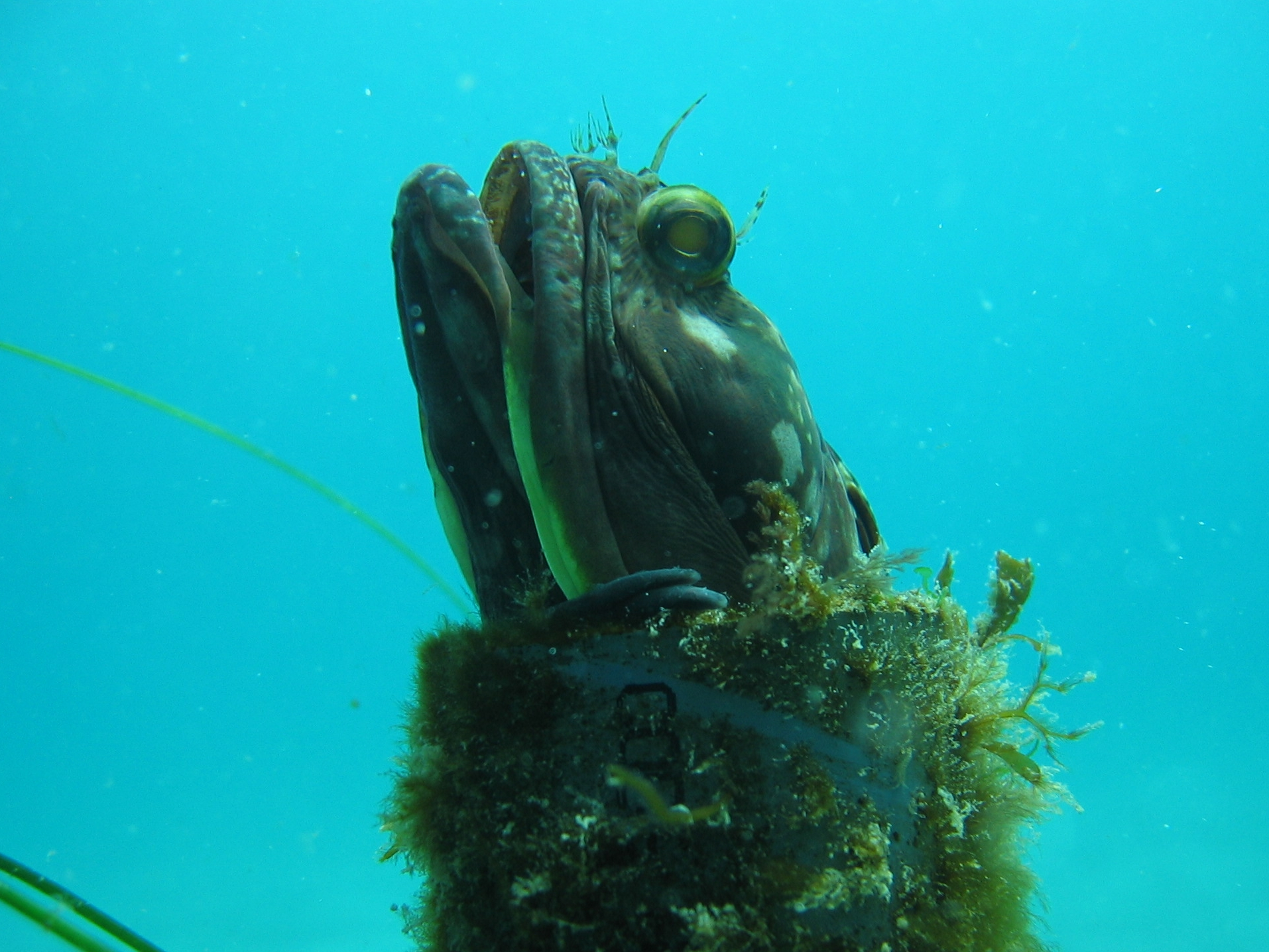
Human-created objects provide hiding places for marine life, like this sarcastic fringehead.

On artificial reef structures intended for ecosystem enhancement, reef communities tend to develop in more or less predictable stages. First, where an ocean current encounters a vertical structure, it can create a plankton-rich upwelling that provides a reliable feeding spot for small fish such as sardines and minnows, which draw in pelagic predators such as tuna and sharks. Next come creatures seeking protection from the ocean's lethal openness—hole and crevice dwellers such as grouper, snapper, squirrelfish, eels and triggerfish. Opportunistic predators such as jack and barracuda also appear. Over months and years the reef structure becomes encrusted with algae, tunicates, hard and soft corals and sponges.

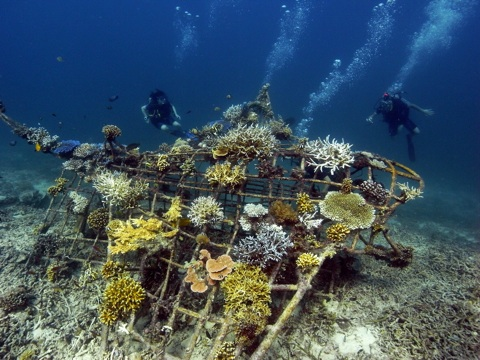
A newly constructed electrified reef set up by Gili Eco Trust in Indonesia

An electrified reef is an artificial reef where a small low voltage electric charge is applied to a sub-sea metallic structures that causes limestone to precipitate onto a metal frame onto which coral planulae can then attach and grow; the process also speeds up post-attachment growth.

3D printing technology has been employed both to create molds to optimize the environment for target species, and to directly create cast ceramic and concrete artificial reefs. Work has also been done to develop environmentally friendly materials. For example, Archireef has designed 3D-printed terracotta Reef Tiles, which are nontoxic, biodegradable, and have a pH-level that is compatible with coral. The tiles are small enough to be handled and installed by a diver. An installation in Hong Kong reported a 95 percent coral survival rate after three years, more than four times the survival rate of more traditional restoration methods.

Restoration and mitigation actions on artificial reefs can include activities such as coral transplantation, larval resettlement, and gardening. For example, the Coral Restoration Foundation in the Florida Keys raises keystone species such as elkhorn (Acropora palmata) and staghorn (Acropora cervicornis) in coral tree nurseries and replants the corals onto degrading coral reefs. Application of such technologies to artificial reefs could help to restore marine ecosystems. A 2023 review article states: "The implementation of artificial reefs to restore marine ecosystems can be well done, investing resources in studies specifically aimed at determining the appropriate characteristics of ARs for each location."

=== Carbon sequestration ===
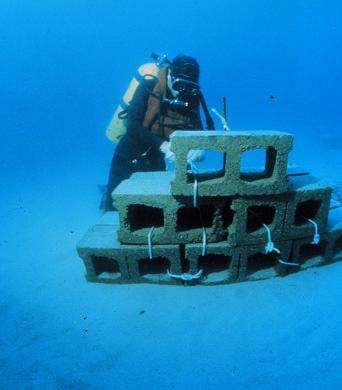
Constructing an artificial reef using concrete breeze blocks

There is interest in the possibility that artificial reefs can be used to support carbon sequestration and counter climate change. Coastal vegetation ecosystems (mangrove, salt marsh, and seagrass), algal beds, and phytoplankton have been identified as potential carbon sinks. It is hoped that increasing biomass at artificial reefs can provide another form of blue carbon storage.

RGV Reef, a 1,650-acre artificial reef created in 2017 in the Gulf of Mexico off the coast of Texas, is being studied to assess its potential for carbon capture. Another study area is located off Juehua Island in the Bohai Sea. Biological, physical, social and technological factors must all be considered in calculating carbon capture flow in aquatic systems. Near Juehua Island, M-shaped artificial reefs improved hydrodynamic conditions for creating a carbon sink, but local marine species had limited availability. Development of active marine management strategies and the introduction of appropriate biological species were suggested as ways to increase carbon capture potential.

In the Caribbean, researchers have found that the placement of breeze blocks as artificial reefs near tropical seagrass meadows can create a positive feedback loop. The reef structures attracted fish by providing shelter, and the fish in turn fertilized the seagrass and increased its productivity, providing both food and shelter. The combination of seagrass and reef structures provided added protection from fish nets as well as increasing biomass in the seagrass meadow. Estimates suggest that Caribbean seagrass beds can provide substantial pools for global carbon.

=== Erosion prevention ===
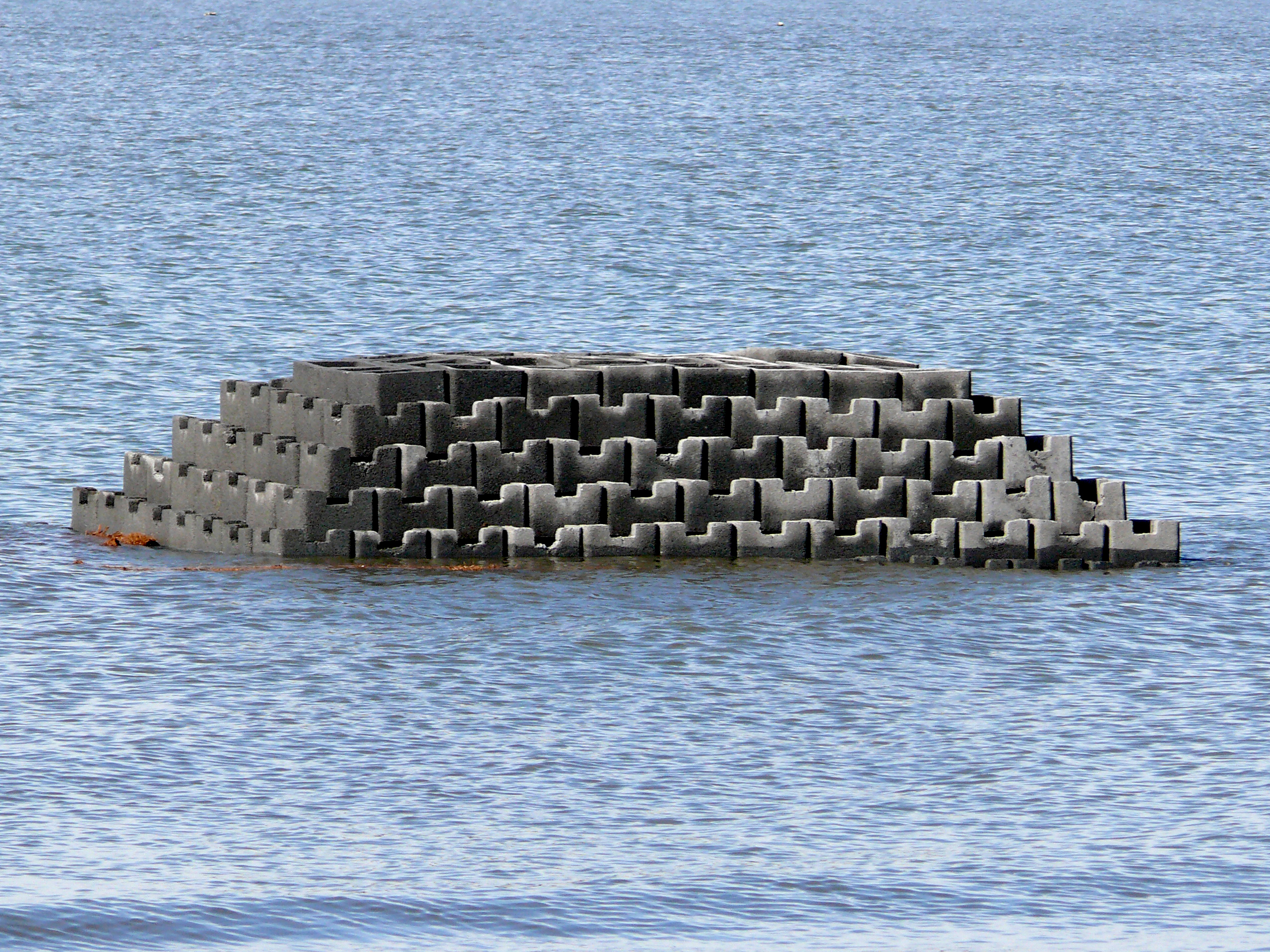
Oyster castle reef, Gandy's Beach shoreline protection project

Some artificial reefs are used to prevent coastal erosion. Geometric and hydrodynamic properties of reefs are particularly important in determining their ability to mitigate coastal erosion. Artificial reefs to prevent erosion can be designed to act in multiple ways. Some are designed to force waves to deposit their energy offshore rather than directly on the coastline.

Other reefs are designed to hold sediment on beaches by trapping the sediment. Reefs are generally custom-designed for each unique zone. Some are designed to support customizable habitat for local target species as well.

=== Artificial surfing reefs ===
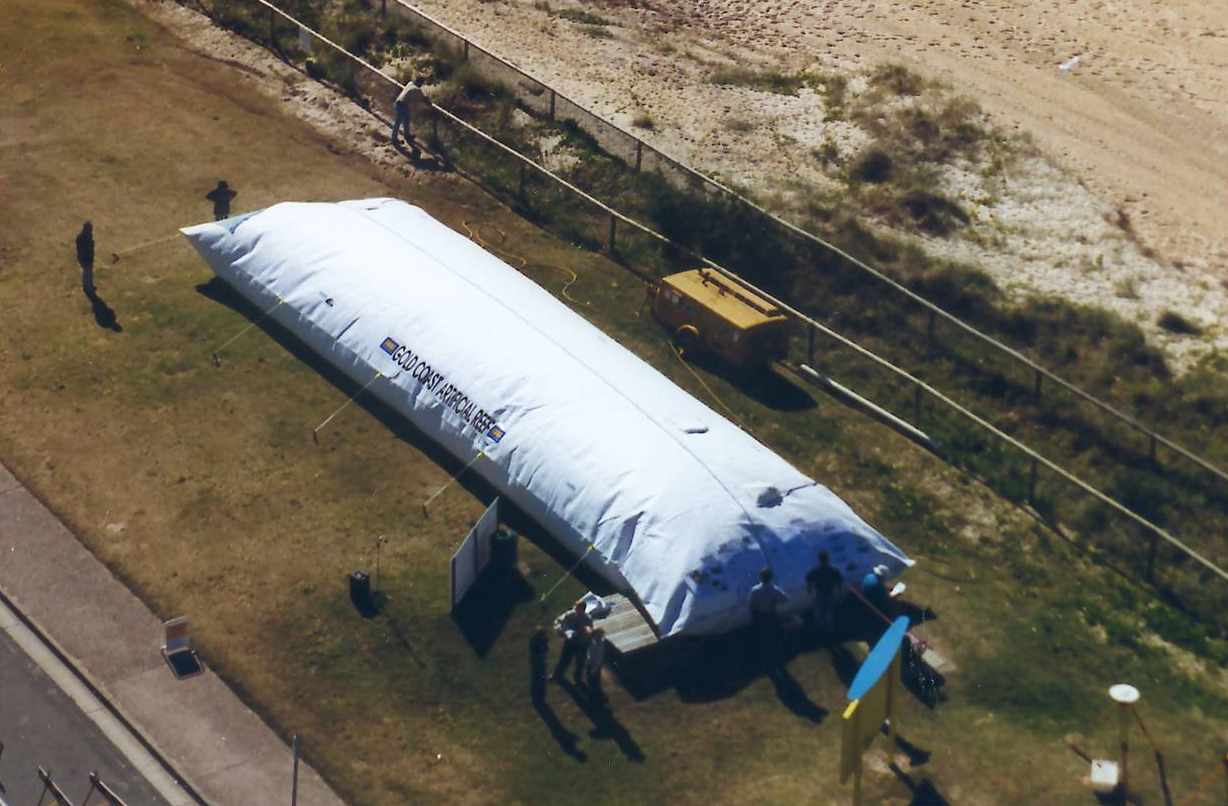
Mega sand container with a by then unprecedented size of 20 m (length) × 4.80 m (diameter) as presented in 1999 on an open day for the public at the construction site for the Gold Coast artificial reef

Some types of artificial reefs, such as surfing reefs, do not have ecosystem enhancement as a major goal. Hoppy's Reef was an early but unsuccessful attempt to create a surfing reef, off Hermosa Beach, California (1971). Artificial surfing reefs have been created at Cable Station Reef (Perth, Western Australia, 1999) Narrowneck Reef (Gold Coast, Queensland, 2000) Chevron Reef, also known as Pratte's Reef (El Segundo, California, 2000, removed 2008). and Boscombe Surf Reef (Dorset, England, 2009, closed 2011).

The construction of artificial surfing reefs has involved a variety of structures including concrete, rock, and geotextile bags filled with sand. Life expectancy of such materials varies widely. Geotextile structures have been found to degrade more quickly than anticipated under ocean conditions. Some analysts argue that they are fundamentally flawed. While use of stone blocks has raised concerns about possible safety hazards for surfers, it has been suggested that using stone may be structurally preferable.

In addition to improving surfing conditions, objectives of building an artificial surfing reef or multi-purpose reef have included stabilizing beachfront, coastal protection and coastal research. Habitat enhancement is sometimes considered as well. However, different materials are preferred for the construction of artificial surfing reefs and the development of reefs for ecosystem enhancement.

A 2012 review of artificial reefs indicated that artificial surfing reefs performed poorly in terms of their intended purpose and successfulness, rarely achieving primary or secondary objectives of "Surfing Enhancement". For Pratte's reef, woven polypropylene bags were used in a first phase, and woven polyester bags in a second stage filling an area of approximately 1600 cubic meters. The area involved was too small to be successful. Even after doubling the original budget, the materials used degraded rapidly, and the resulting remediation cost more than the installation. Mount Reef at Mount Maunganui in New Zealand used more durable containers and a volume of around 6,000 cubic meters of sand. Although somewhat successful in creating waves, it too deteriorated and had to be removed. The Narrowneck Reef was much larger, at least 60,000 cubic meters, and was somewhat successful in its primary objective of shoreline stabilization, but less so in improving surfing.

Several projects in Australia have used stone to augment existing sites. Cable Station Reef added limestone rocks to an existing reef. At Burkitts Reef on the Woongarra Coast, large boulders were broken down to fill gaps in an existing boulder and gravel reef. At Palm Beach Reef on the Gold Coast of Australia, stone boulders were used to adapt the shape of an existing breakwater and protect added sand. Another artificial stone reef, located in Borth, Wales, was designed primarily for coastal protection.

A major issue is that changes occurring in the lee of submerged reef structures are complex, not well understood, and difficult to model and predict. As of 2012, existing prototypes have been characterized as "trial or experimental only", and predictive models have not achieved "accuracy or reliability", although it has been hoped that "ongoing construction and monitoring of submerged constructed reefs (SCRs) will result in a better understanding of the processes and refined methods for predicting shoreline response". Even in cases which were initially seen as successful, subsequent changes and deterioration of structures have led to poor outcomes.

Surfers' expectations of artificial reefs, particularly "an expectation by the general public of consistent, quality waves during a wide range of environmental conditions" have also led to disappointment. Surfing science is a relatively new field. The ability to achieve consistency of surfing waves in a range of conditions in natural environments generally requires wave pre-conditioning or large scale breaking features or both. The scale of early artificial surfing reefs was too small to achieve such consistency.

=== Recreational dive sites ===
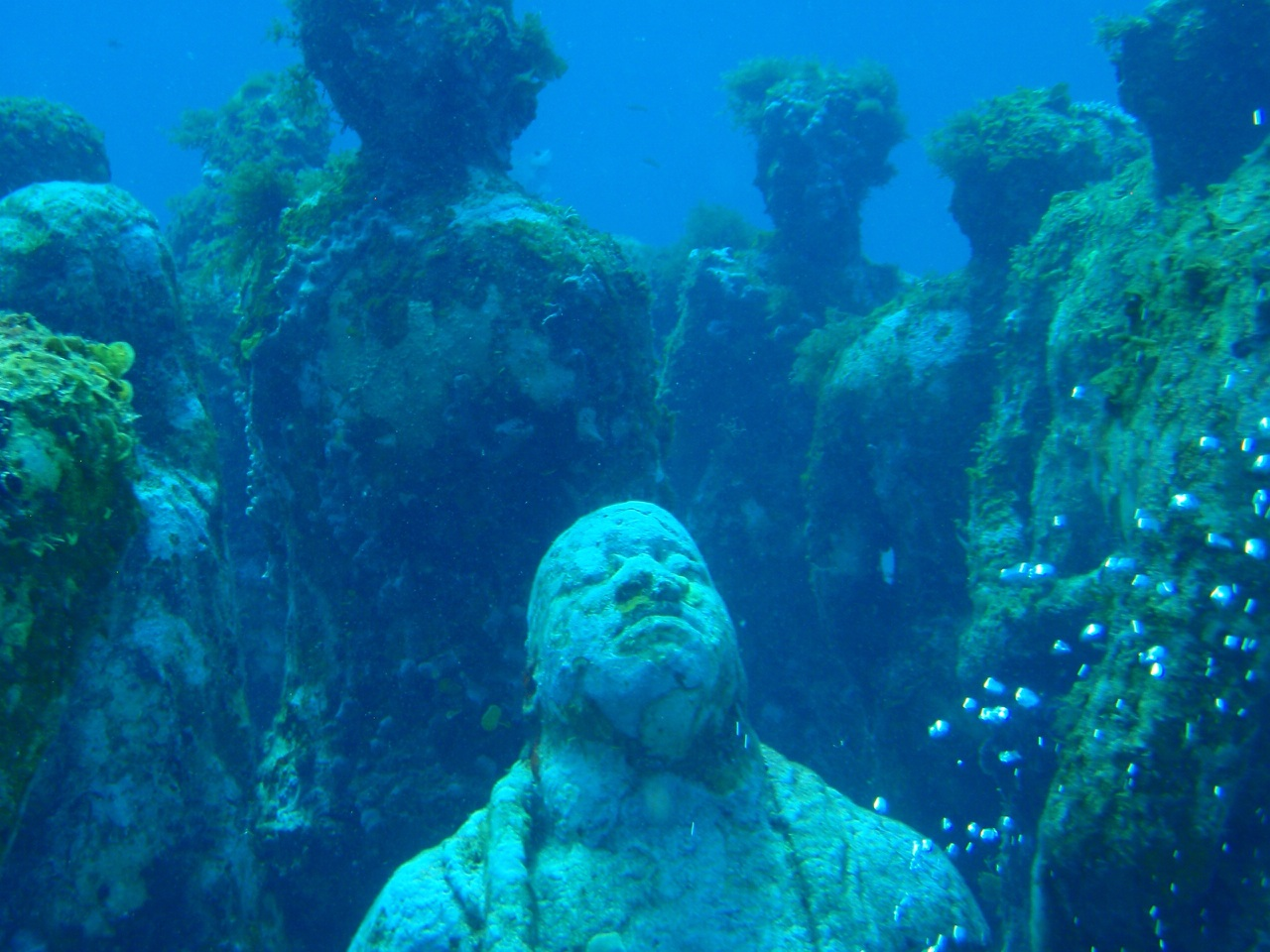
Statue by Jason deCaires Taylor, Museo Subacuático de Arte

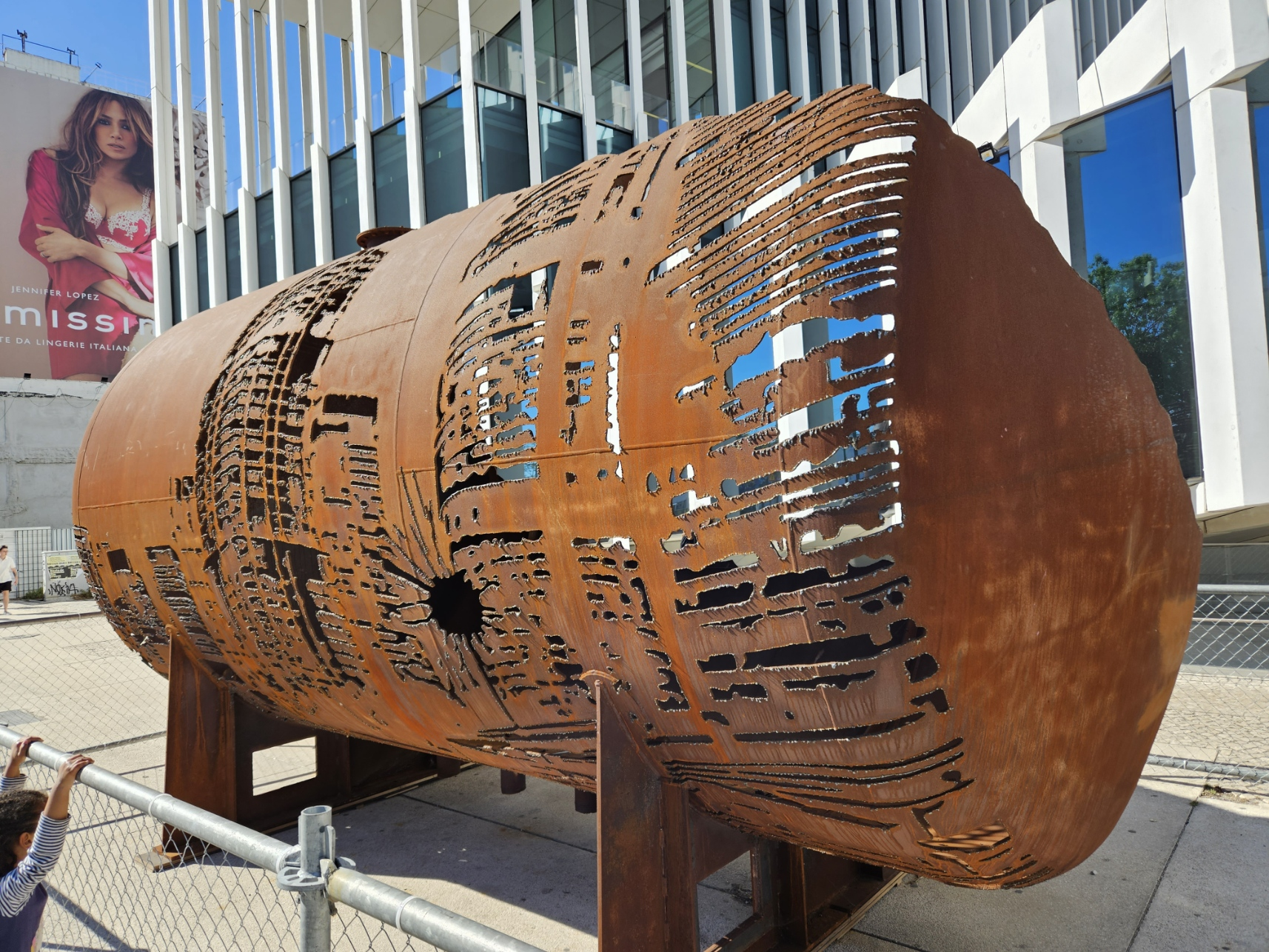
Artwork for the creation of Artreef, Albufeira

Thousands of popular wreck diving sites throughout the world are shipwrecks sunk as artificial reefs. Some of these wrecks were sunk deliberately to attract divers. The USS Spiegel Grove and USS Oriskany in Florida, and USS Indra and USS Aeolus in North Carolina draw thousands of divers annually.

In other areas, dive sites have been developed in collaboration with artists as artworks. For example, the Museo Subacuático de Arte in the Cancún National Marine Park contains hundreds of life-size statues, offering divers an alternative to sensitive coral reefs in the region. Each statue is made from a plaster mold of a living person, using a PH neutral "marine cement", by Jason deCaires Taylor.

In Lisbon, 13 artworks by Alexandre Farto (Vhils) will be placed in an artificial reef off the coast of Albufeira as of June 2024. The works are made from parts of decommissioned power stations.

A study in Barbados showed a marked variation in diver satisfaction with artificial reef diving experiences. Novice divers tended to be more satisfied than more experienced divers, who had a strong preference for natural reefs and large shipwrecks.

== Environmental concerns ==
Environmental concerns about artificial reefs include possible physical damage to existing natural sites in the installation area; their potential to disrupt existing patterns of marine life by introducing non-native species and by attracting fish, eggs and larvae from surrounding natural habitats; their potential to concentrate fish in areas where it becomes easier to catch them, leading to overfishing and long-term damage to fisheries; and the potential for the materials used in artificial reefs to degrade and cause damage to the natural habitat. This can include toxicity from contaminants such as paint, oil, and plastics, as well as parts of the reef breaking away and becoming ocean waste or washing onto natural reefs and beaches.

=== Changing populations ===
Many marine organisms exhibit a high degree of movement or dispersal. The fish attracted to artificial reef zones vary from reef to reef depending on the reef's age, size and structure. Preferred habitats vary both between and within species, depending on an organism's developmental stage and behavior. Environments that are well-suited to larval to juvenile stages may differ from those favored by adults. For example, 1–2-year-old red snapper (Lutjanus campechanus) show a much higher attraction to living in vertical artificial reef structures than older Red Snapper. By ages 6–8, adults return to muddy and sand bottom habitats, which provide a home for the species' pelagic larval phase. Being aware of how organisms relate to the marine habitat is critical to mapping marine resources and understanding how artificial reefs affect marine processes. The siting of artificial reefs should consider the presence of existing natural habitats and the needs of species at multiple developmental stages, including the need for reproductive and early stage habitat.

The opportunistic use of shipwrecks and oil derricks as artificial reefs creates a new trophic structure for the local ecosystem. The trophic structure of artificial and natural reefs has been shown to differ strongly. Artificial reefs do not develop the same functions and diversity as natural reefs over time, unless their structure is similar to natural reefs. For example, the Sint Eustatius reef, nearly 200 years old, has developed a diverse and healthy ecosystem, but it has different and less abundant coral species than a nearby natural reef.

As a result, artificial reefs can unbalance the natural ecosystem and affect nearby habitats, in some cases attracting non-native and invasive species that disrupt local ecosystems. In 2008, at Palmyra Atoll south of Hawaii, iron leaching from a shipwreck led to increases in algae and a sea anemone called a corallimorph, smothering existing coral to create a "black reef".

Artificial reefs can show quick increases in local fish population, coral reef and algae growth. However, the attraction–production dilemma is the question of whether local increases in fish stocks result from broader-area distributional changes in populations (the attraction hypothesis) or increases in local production (the production hypothesis). Some researchers, such as James Bohnsack, a biologist with the National Marine Fisheries Service (NMFS), have argued that the amount of biomass found on artificial reefs is attracted away from nearby areas rather than developing there. According to this view, artificial reefs do not increase fish populations. Instead they operate as a type of fish aggregating device (FAD) bringing in fish, eggs and larvae from other reefs. However, there is some evidence to suggest that artificial reefs can be a source of production as well as attraction. A 2022 review concluded that "the attraction-production question around ARs ... can only be assessed on a case-by-case basis for each AR, and validated after their installation."

Concentrating fish on a reef makes for easier fishing. The increased concentration of fish on artificial reefs can make it easier to harvest fish stocks, with the potential for overfishing and long-term damage to fisheries. This has implications for artisanal and industrial fishing management.

=== Debris ===
There are concerns that the placement of opportunity artificial reefs will be abused and become a pretext for disguised ocean dumping. Regulatory measures have been put forward by the U.S. and internationally in an effort to counter abuses, but may provide little protection.

Some artificial reefs have been found to be less stable than originally hoped, breaking into component parts that become ocean refuse, washing onto natural reefs and beaches and damaging them. In the early 1970s waste tires were used to create a number of artificial reefs. Tropical storms later demolished the tire containment system, washing tires onto beaches, destroying nearby coral reefs and inhibiting new coral growth. On the Osborne Reef off the coast of Fort Lauderdale, Florida, storms broke the nylon straps holding the original tire bundles together. As of November 2019, 250,000 of an estimated 700,000 tires have been removed. France has begun removing its tire reefs. The Ocean Conservancy now includes tire removal during the International Coastal Cleanup in September of each year. Since 2021, 4Ocean has added collecting tires from the bottom to their cleanup operations as well.

Some attempts to construct artificial surfing reefs have also been problematic. A number of early surfing installations used geotextile bags filled with sand which degraded more quickly than anticipated. Cases such as Pratte's Reef in California and Mount Reef at Mount Maunganui in New Zealand have required extensive remediation work to remove materials. In some cases, remediation has cost more than the original installation. It has been argued that this approach to reef construction is fundamentally flawed.

=== Toxicity ===
Artificial reefs, particularly opportunistic ones involving materials that were not originally intended for marine use, can degrade and cause damage to the natural habitat. If inappropriate materials are used in an artificial reef, they can interfere with the growth of algae which provide a food source for coral, causing the coral to die.

PVCs, plastics, oil, paint, asbestos, iron and other rusting metal, can release toxic contaminants such as Poly-chlorinated biphenols (PCBs) and heavy metals (lead, copper, nickel, cadmium, zinc, silver, and mercury). Toxic materials can potentially enter the food chain and affect it at all levels, including fish and humans. However, consumption of seafood from artificial reefs and wrecks is considered unlikely to pose a long-term health risk for humans at average levels of consumption, with the exception of urchins and other grazing shellfish which should be avoided.

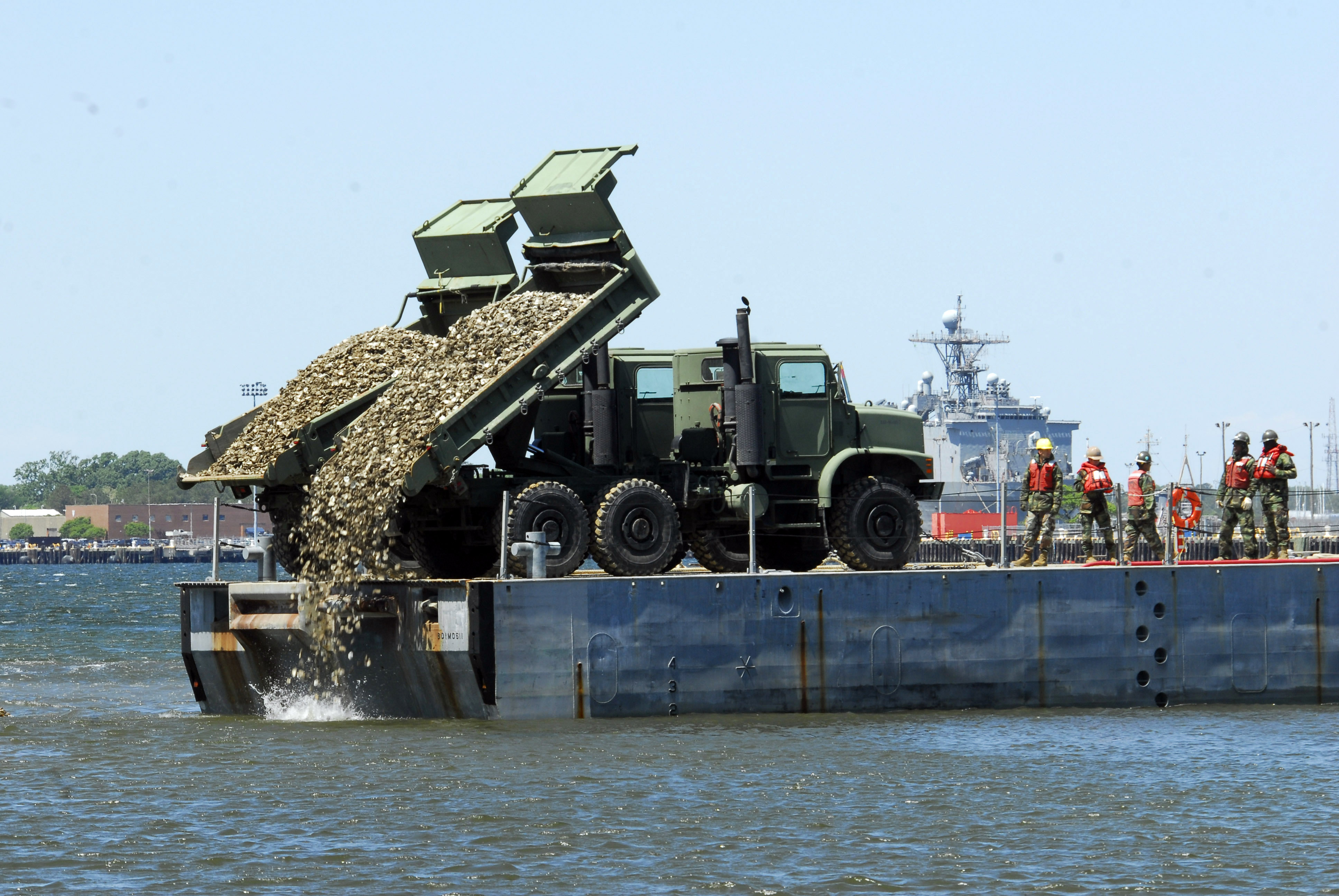
Using natural materials, such as oyster shells, can help create more natural artificial reefs.

International recommendations state that artificial reefs should use inert materials. Under the 2009 "Specific Guidelines for Assessment of Inert, Inorganic Geological Material" developed by the London Convention and Protocol/UNEP, inert materials cannot cause contamination through leaching, physical and chemical deterioration, or biological activity.

Attempts continue to be made to create stable waste-based materials that will not pose a hazard, for use in artificial reefs. For example, oil and coal fly ash have been stabilized with cement and lime to create experimental artificial reef blocks. However, as with the use of tires, there continue to be environmental concerns about the potential for leaching.

In the United States, best practices for preparing vessels for use in artificial reefs include assuming that divers may access all locations, removing potential hazards to divers, removing all polluting or toxic materials, including PCBs (in compliance with applicable water quality standards for class III ocean waters), and clearing debris and floatables. However, if materials over the pollutant threshold are too difficult to remove, permission to bypass their removal can be given by the EPA, as happened in the case of the ex-USS Oriskany. In spite of spending $20 million to decontaminate the vessel, the ship still contained an estimated 700 pounds of PCBs when it was sunk in 2006. Subsequent testing by the Florida Fish and Wildlife Conservation Commission over a four-year period found elevated levels of PCBs in fish living in the ship's "reef".

Off the coast of California, an artificial reef has been constructed to lure fish away from a toxic site. Over 35 years, the Montrose Chemical Corporation of California, a maker of DDT, improperly disposed of toxic chemical waste through the sewer system and by dumping barrels of waste into the ocean. As part of remediation efforts by the National Oceanic and Atmospheric Administration (NOAA), 70,000 tons of quarry rock were placed on the ocean bottom nearer the beach in 2020, creating a new habitat to attract fish and kelp to a safer area.

== Examples ==
=== United States ===
==== Florida ====
Florida is the site of many artificial reefs, many created from deliberately sunken ships, including Coast Guard cutters Duane and Bibb the U.S. Navy landing ship Spiegel Grove, and the ocean liner SS United States.

===== Osborne Reef =====
In the early 1970s, more than 2,000,000 used vehicle tires were dumped off the coast of Fort Lauderdale, Florida, to form an artificial reef. However, the tires were not properly secured to the reef structures, and ocean currents broke them loose, sending them crashing into the developing reef and its natural neighbors.

===== Neptune Reef =====
Neptune Memorial Reef was originally conceived as an art project called The Atlantis Reef Project and was envisioned and created by Gary Levine and Kim Brandell. Burial at sea became a way of financing the project. As of 2011, about 200 "placements" had occurred. Cremated remains are mixed with concrete and either encased in columns or molded into sea-star, brain-coral, 15 feet (4.6 m) castings of lions or other shapes before entering the water.

===== Ex-USS Massachusetts =====
In 1921 the U.S. battleship Massachusetts was scuttled in shallow water off the coast of Pensacola, Florida and then used as a target for experimental artillery. In 1956 the ship was declared the property of the state of Florida by the Florida Supreme Court. Since 1993 the wreck has been a Florida Underwater Archaeological Preserve and is included in the National Register of Historic Places. She serves as an artificial reef and recreational dive site.

===== Ex-USS Oriskany =====
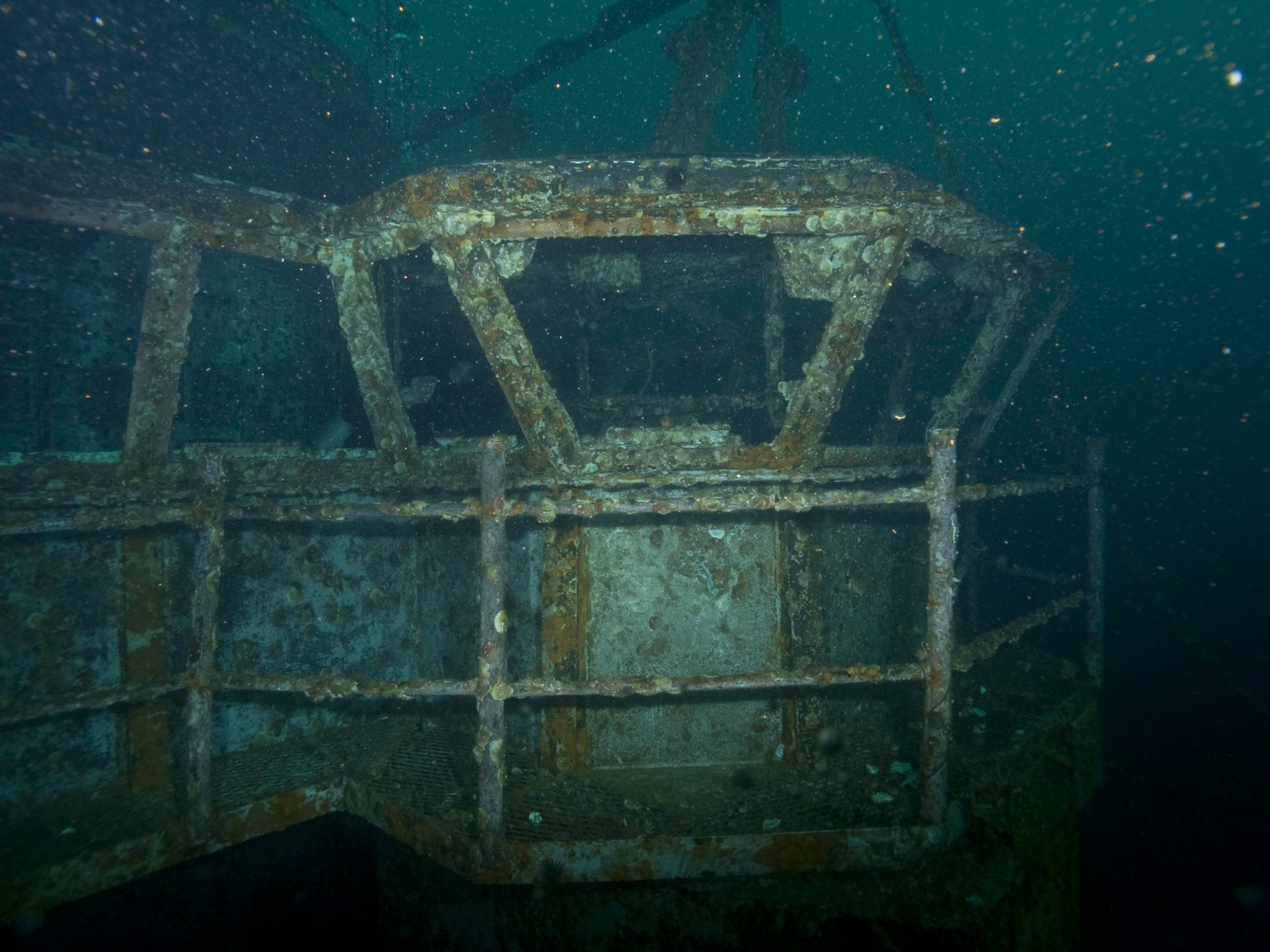
Sea life growing on the remains of USS Oriskany, intentionally sunk in 2006 to become an artificial reef

Once the world's largest artificial reef between 2006 and 2026, the reef was created by sinking of the 44,000 ton aircraft carrier USS Oriskany off the coast of Pensacola, Florida, in 2006.

===== Ex-USNS Hoyt S. Vandenberg =====
The second-largest artificial reef is USNS Hoyt S. Vandenberg, a former World War II–era troop transport that served as a spacecraft-tracking ship after the war. Hoyt S. Vandenberg was scuttled seven miles off Key West on May 27, 2009, in 140 feet (43 m) of clear water. Supporters expected the ship to draw recreational divers away from natural reefs, allowing those reefs to recover from damage from overuse.

===== Ex-USS Spiegel Grove =====
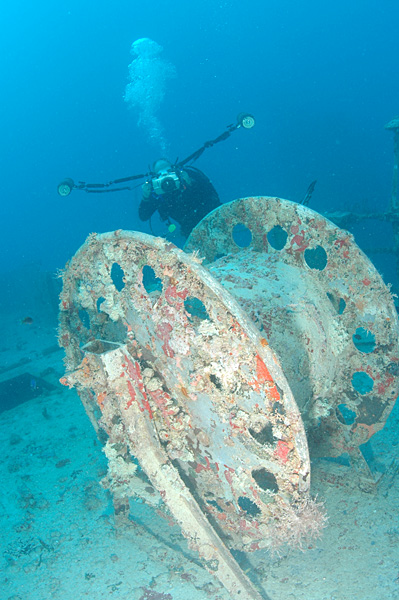
Large reel on deck of Spiegel Grove, with diver

The ex-USS Spiegel Grove is located on Dixie Shoal, 6 miles (9.7 km) off the Florida Keys in the Florida Keys National Marine Sanctuary. Her location is 25°04′00″N 80°18′01″W.

===== Ex-SS United States =====
The ocean liner SS United States sunk off the coast of Destin and Fort Walton Beach in Okaloosa County, Florida, on November 11 2026 at 8:59 PM Central Standard time. On November 9, United States departed Mobile, Alabama, where it stayed there for over a year. Originally, it was supposed to depart on November 10 and be sunken on November 12. However, due to high winds, United States got sunken one day earlier on November 11. It will be studied by researchers from Woods Hole and they hope that corals, sponges and invertebrates be attracted to inhabit it. It surpassed the USS Oriskany as the world's largest artificial reef, being visible as high as 100 feet, with her funnels removed.

==== Georgia ====
In 1970, the Georgia Department of Natural Resources (DNR) began building a network of artificial reefs to provide habitats for game fish. Georgia generally lacks natural coral reefs because the ocean floor off the coast is generally too sandy and too low-sloping to promote coral growth. These artificial reefs attract a huge variety of organisms; according to marine ecologist from Georgia Southern University, "the diversity rivals natural coral reefs."

===== L Reef =====
L Reef was established in 1976. It is located roughly 23 nautical miles (43 km; 26 mi) east of Ossabaw Island and is 55–65 feet (17–20 m) below the ocean's surface. It contains a variety of different debris, including New York City subway cars, M-60 tanks formerly used by the United States Army, and concrete culverts. On December 21, 2023, the DNR unloaded two retired railcars from the Metro Atlanta Rapid Transit Authority. In August 2024, divers discovered soft coral growing on the railcars and counted nine species of game fish.

==== North Carolina ====
===== Ex-USS Yancey =====
USS Yancey was sunk as an artificial reef off Morehead City, North Carolina, in 1990, as AR-302. She is lying on her starboard side at a depth of 160 ft (49 m)

===== Ex-USCGC Spar =====
USCGC Spar was scuttled in June 2004 by Captain Tim Mullane in 108 feet (33 m) of water, 30 miles (48 km) off Morehead City, North Carolina, where she serves as an artificial reef.

===== Ex-USS Indra =====
USS Indra was sunk as an artificial reef, 4 August 1992 in 60 feet (18 m) of water. Its coordinates are 34°33′55″N 76°58′30″W.

===== Ex-USS Aeolus =====
USS Aeolus was sunk to form an artificial reef in August 1988 as AR-305. The ex-Aeolus is located 18.3 nautical miles (33.9 km; 21.1 mi) from Beaufort Inlet Sea Buoy in 104 feet (30 m) of water.

==== Delaware ====
===== Redbird Reef =====
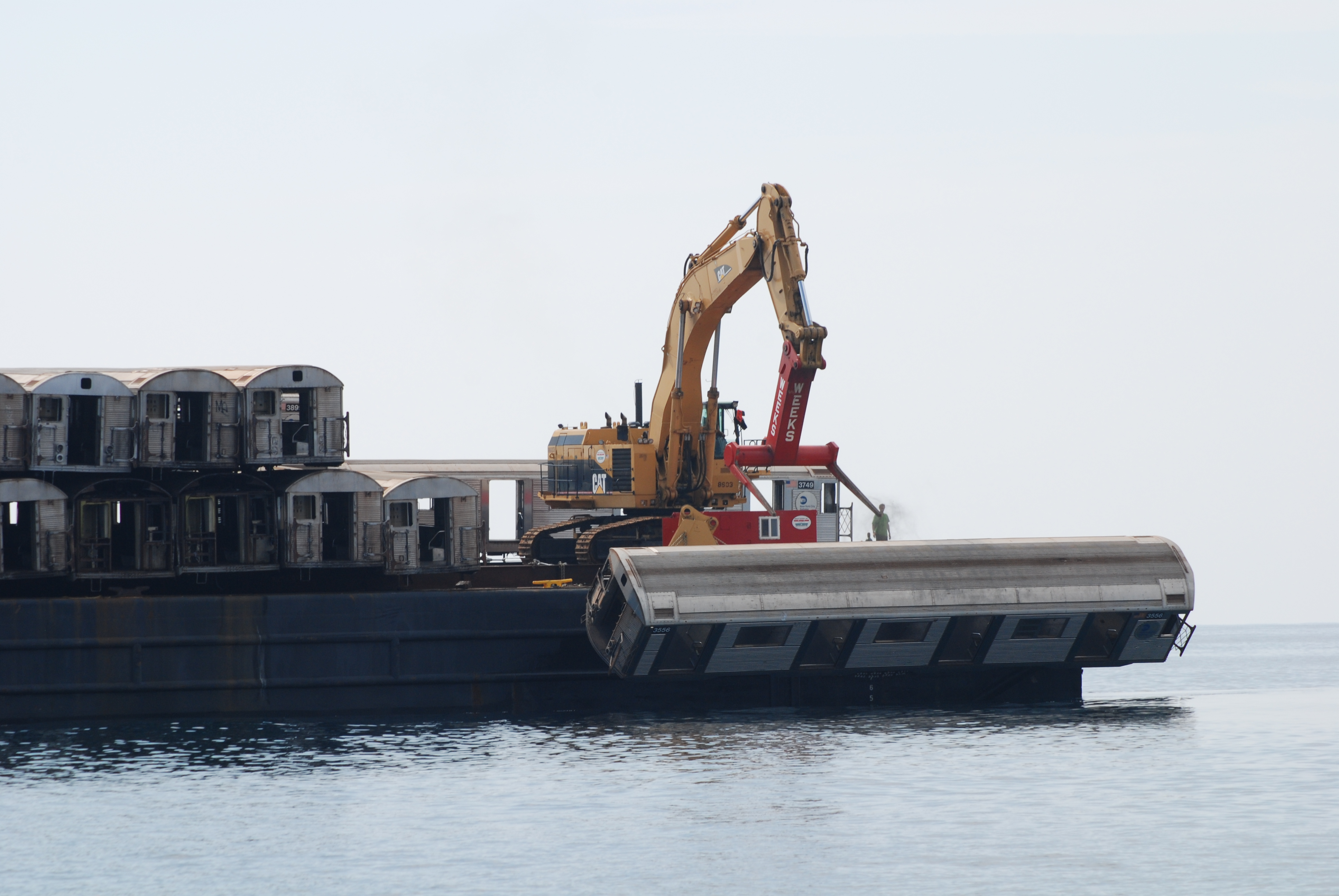
Retired NYC subway cars on a barge before being sunk off Slaughter Beach, Delaware, to form an artificial reef in July 2008

In the late 2000s, the New York City Transit Authority decided to retire an outdated fleet of subway cars to make room for new R142 and R142A trains. The obsolete subway cars, (nicknamed "Redbirds"), had run on the A Division (former Interborough Rapid Transit Company routes) of the New York City Subway system for 40 years. Each car was stripped, decontaminated, loaded on a barge, and sunk in the Atlantic Ocean off the coast of Delaware, Virginia, South Carolina, Georgia, and Florida. Some cars had number plates removed because of rust, which were then auctioned off on eBay. A total of 1,200 subway cars were sunk for this project.

In September 2007, the NYCTA approved a further contract with Weeks Marine worth $6 million, to send 1,600 of its retired subway cars to be used as artificial reefs. The old models were sheathed in stainless steel, except for the fiberglass reinforced plastic front ends, which were removed before sinking. The retired fleet included old work trains and cars that were badly damaged beyond repair.

=== Canada ===
==== British Columbia ====
In 2006, a Boeing 737-200 that was deemed no longer airworthy by Air Canada was sunk by the Artificial Reef Society of British Columbia.

=== Mexico ===
==== Cancun Underwater Museum ====
Since November 2009, artist Jason deCaires Taylor has created more than 400 life size sculptures off the coast of Cancun, Mexico at the Cancun Underwater Museum. The coral reefs in this region suffered heavy degradation due to repetitive hurricane abuse. This project was funded by The National Marine Park and the Cancun Nautical Association. It was designed to emulate coral reefs using a neutral ph clay. Taylor constructed unique settings depicting daily activities ranging from a man watching TV to a 1970s replica of a Volkswagen Beetle. This artificial reef relieved pressure from the nearby Manchones Reef.

=== Australia ===
Since the late 1990s, the Australian government has been providing decommissioned warships for use as artificial reefs for recreational scuba diving. So far, seven ships have been sunk:

- HMAS Swan at Dunsborough in Western Australia during December 1997.
- HMAS Perth at Albany in Western Australia during November 2001.
- HMAS Hobart in Yankalilla Bay in South Australia during November 2002.
- HMAS Brisbane off the Sunshine Coast in Queensland during July 2005.
- HMAS Canberra at a site west of the entrance to Port Phillip Bay in Victoria during October 2009.
- HMAS Adelaide off Terrigal on the New South Wales Central Coast during April 2011
- HMAS Tobruk off Hervey Bay on the Queensland Coast on 29 June 2018

Cooper Reef is a purpose-built artificial reef off the coast of Esperance, Western Australia. It is at a depth of 30 m (98 ft) and consists of 128 dome-like concrete modules designed to attract fish and enhance fish stocks, thereby creating new fishing and recreation opportunities for tourists, anglers and local families.

=== Costa Rica ===
At Playa Hermosa, the Playa Hermosa Artificial Reef Project has created an artificial reef using discarded porcelain insulators.

=== Curacao ===
On Curaçao, Secore International has created 12 artificial reefs using the cost-effective technique with small tetrapod-shaped concrete structures, seeded with coral larvae.

=== Canary Islands ===
Near Playa de Garcey on Fuerteventura in the Canary Islands, the SS America (1939) lays as a more recent artificial reef. In 1994, while being towed to Thailand, the towing cables snapped. After multiple attempts to re-connect the cables, they were unsuccessful. The next day, she landed off the coast of the Canary Islands, where she deteriorated for years. In 1995, due to the rough waves, she split into two, both sides sank slowly. By 2007, at least 5% of the ship was visible. In 2024, nothing was left, where it had become an artificial reef.

=== Saba and Statia ===
The AROSSTA project is located in the Caribbean Dutch islands of St. Eustatius and Saba. Based on comparisons of the effectiveness of reef balls, layered cakes, and rock for artificial reefs, researchers have developed MOREEF (Modular Restoration Reef) to provide a more complex internal structure and increase shelter availability.

=== Gibraltar ===
The Gibraltar Reef was first proposed by Eric Shaw in 1973. Initial experiments with tires proved unsuccessful as the tires were swept away by currents or buried underneath sand. In 1974, boats from local marinas and the Gibraltar Port Authority were donated. The first two were barges that were sunk in Camp Bay. In 2006, a 65-ton wooden boat, True Joy (also referred to as Noah's Ark) was sunk there as well.

Shaw helped to found the Helping Hand Trust in 1994. The Trust works with researchers from around the world to expand the reef and to conserve, protect and monitor the natural world. The artificial reef, which contains more than 30 scuttled and wrecked vessels, was the first to be constructed in Europe. It continues to be one of the largest.

Expansion of the Artificial Reef halted after the cargo vessel New Flame collided with the Torm Gertrud and sank in an area known as 'Los Picos'. Los Picos was one of two natural reefs within Gibraltar's EU registered area of special interest, with a high level of biodiversity. After two years of salvage work, it was determined that attempting to remove the remaining keel and bottom would harm the natural reef. Authorities decided to leave the rest where it was.

In 2013, more than 70 concrete blocks were sunk by the government of Gibraltar (independent of Eric Shaw's trust), each one square meter in size with protruding metal bars. This led to heated debate between the United Kingdom and Spain, with Gibraltar accusing Spain of over forty incursions into their waters per month and Spain accusing Gibraltar of including metal bars in the reef to stop Spanish fishermen trawling the seabed for fish. The dropping led to a diplomatic conflict between the two countries because Gibraltar is a British Overseas Territory. By 2015, Shaw reported that there was "all kinds of life in the new reef from microbiological species to conger and moray eels".

=== India ===
==== Temple Reef ====
Experimentation with artificial reef structures at the Temple reef dive site off the coast of Pondicherry, India, began as early as 2013. The diving centre Temple Adventures built a Temple-shaped structure in 2015 at a depth of 18 metres (59 ft), using recycled materials such as concrete, rocks, trees, palms, and iron bars.

The Temple Reef Foundation was founded in 2017 to support marine conservation and the further development of artificial surfing reefs in the area. In 2019 Bennington's Reef was added to the Temple reef dive site using a patented design for cement-dolomite blocks. The initial block was 3D printed, and further blocks were built using molded frames. In 2020, the project began testing a new block prototype that uses eggshell waste, sand, pebbles, and cement, stabilized with iron rebar.

=== Dubai ===
Pearl of Dubai is an art-inspired Lost City off the coast of Dubai. The site encompasses five acres and is located at the World Islands. At a depth of 10 to 20 metres (33 to 66 ft), the site is designed as an ancient lost city, complete with temples and statues using regional design cues from 800 BC. In 2023, designs for the world's largest ocean restoration and ecotourism project was unveiled in Dubai. The project named Dubai Reefs, aims to use 3D printing technology to create the world's largest artificial reef.

=== Aqaba, Jordan ===
Jordan made an under-water military vehicles museum, which is intended to form an artificial reef over time.

=== Philippines ===
Underwater Chocolate Hills is an artificial reef project undertaken by Spindrift Reefs Dive Center off the coast of Panglao Island in the Philippines. It consists of broken coral harvested by local divers, who attach it to wire structures. The structures are built in the same shape as the Chocolate Hills, which can be found in the Bohol Region. The intent is to create a new dive site and new marine habitat.

=== Lebanon ===
In 2018, the Lebanese Army donated 10 stripped tanks to an NGO and sunk them 3 km away from the coast of Sidon, South Lebanon. They also sunk vans, a barge and a crane.

=== Malta ===
Following a gas explosion that occurred on 3 February 1995, the Libyan-owned motor tanker Um El Faroud was scuttled off the coast of Malta as an artificial reef.

== See also ==
- Artificial Reef Society of British Columbia – Canadian non-profit to create artificial reefs for habitat enhancement and recreation
- Artificial reefs in Japan – Underwater structures to increase sustainable fishing activities
- Artificial wave – Swimming pool with artificial waves
- Cancún Underwater Museum – Underwater display of sculpture in Cancún, Mexico
- Fish aggregating device – Man-made object used to attract ocean-going pelagic fish
- Marine debris – Human-created solid waste in the sea or ocean
- Marine habitat concrete
- Multi-purpose reef – Underwater structure intended to produce surfable waves from prevailing swell
- Scuttling – Act of deliberately sinking a ship by allowing water to flow into the hull
- Ship graveyard – Location where scrapped ships are left
- Sinking ships for wreck diving sites – Scuttling old ships to produce artificial reefs
- Spawning bed – Underwater surface on which fish deposit their eggs
