= St Clement's Church, Bournemouth =

Church in Dorset, England

St Clement's Church
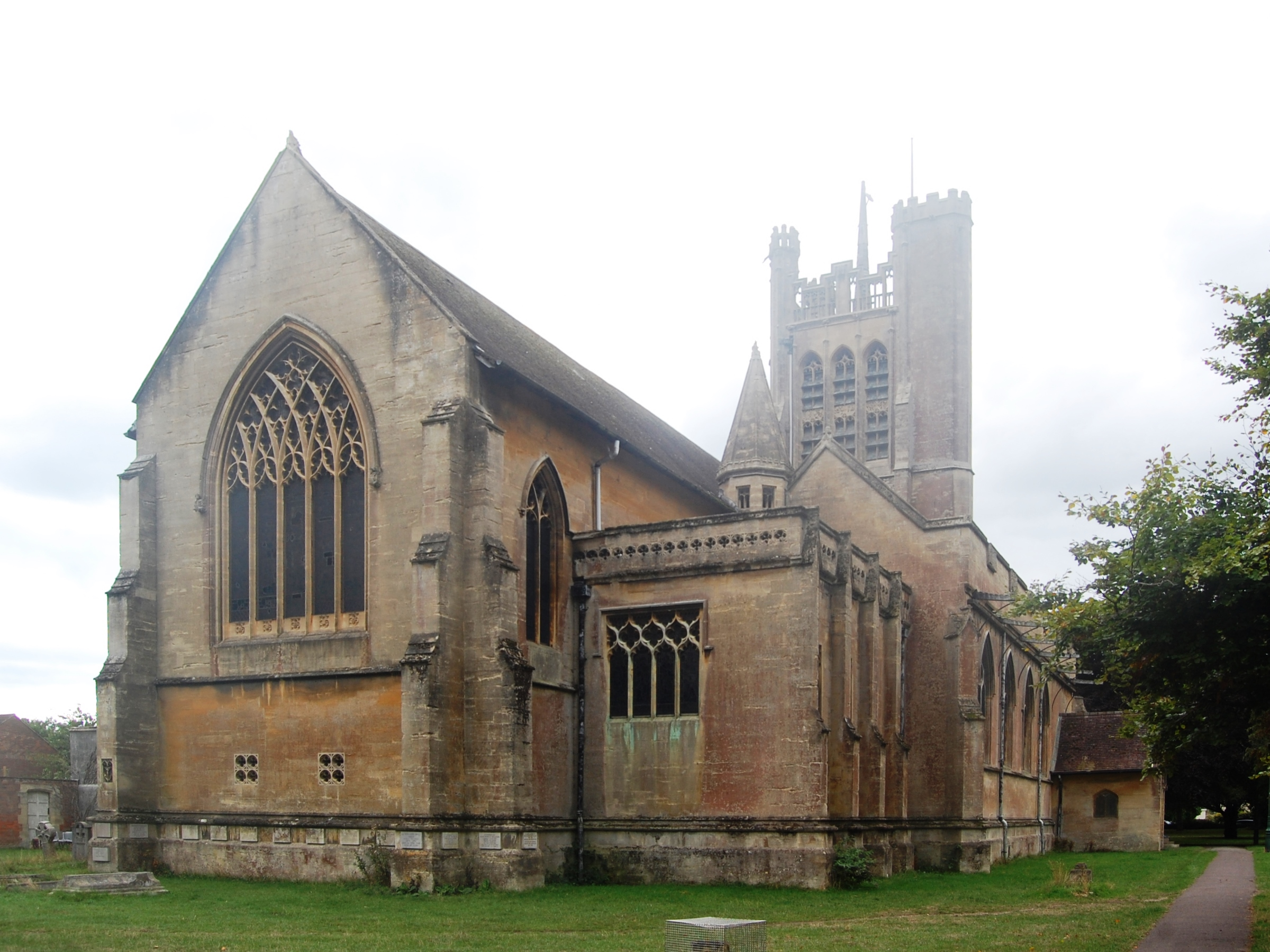
- St Clement's Church in 2022

Religion
- Affiliation: Anglicanism
- Ecclesiastical or organizational status: active

Location
- Location: St Clement's Road, Springbourne, Bournemouth, Dorset, England
- Interactive map of St Clement's Church
- Coordinates: 50.72863°N 1.84939°W

Architecture
- Architect: J. D. Sedding
- Type: Church
- Style: Arts and Crafts architecture
- Completed: 1871-1873

St Clement's Church is one of three Grade I listed churches in Bournemouth; along with St Stephen's and St Peter's. The church stands on St Clements Road and is recorded by Historic England as being in poor condition.

== History ==
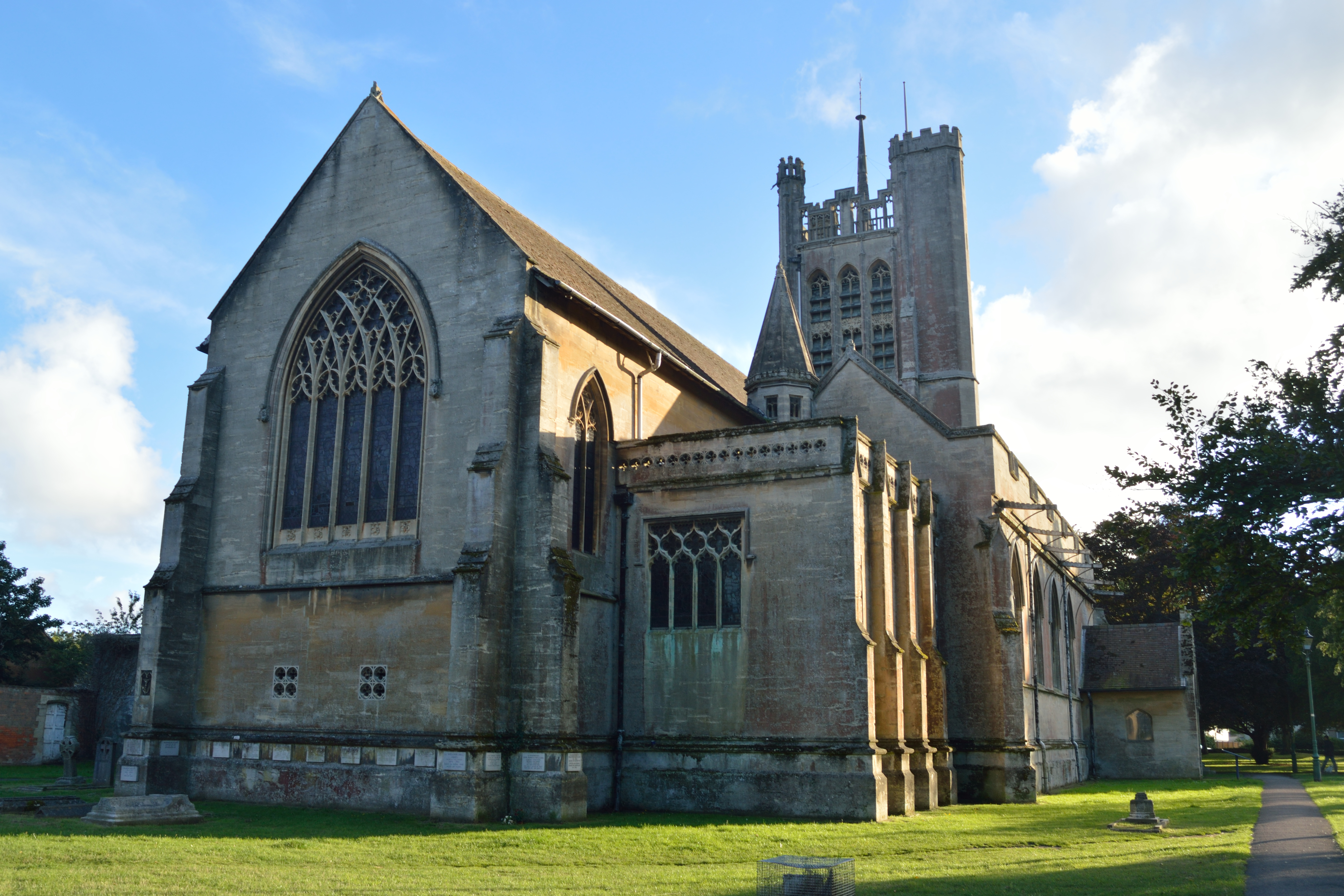
St Clement Church from north-east.

The church was built between 1871 and 1873 and was the first major church designed by J. D. Sedding.

The church became listed on 5 May 1952.

The church was completely restored ready for the centenary in 1973. The historic Gray and Davison organ was also restored at this time by John Budgen. The church remained in very good repair until at least 1991, when the last Vicar of the parish, William Albert Aries, retired.

In recent years the surrounding church gardens and graveyard has been reported as being scene to a number of incidents of anti-social behaviour order; including drug dealing and indecent exposure.
