= Boscombe Surf Reef =

Artificial reef off the English coast

Coordinates: 50.7185°N 1.8417°W

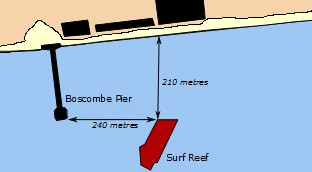
Location plan of surf reef

Boscombe Surf Reef was an artificial reef built to enhance surfing conditions at Boscombe in Dorset, England. The project cost £3.2 million and is considered to have failed.

The Boscombe Surf Reef was the first surfing reef to be constructed in the Northern Hemisphere. Boscombe, a district of Bournemouth, opted to build a surfing reef to provide a unique focal point for the town's multi-million pound waterfront redevelopment effort, with Bournemouth Borough Council hoping that the reef would "give Boscombe beach its own identity, raise the profile of Boscombe and attract a large number of visitors on an annual basis.” In April 2014, after being closed since March 2011, the council re-branded the reef as a coastal activity park concentrating on diving and wind surfing, as well as kite and wind surfing.

== Design ==
The idea came originally from David Weight, a member of Wessex Surf Club, whose proposals to Bournemouth council and initial research date from 1993. The reef is thus sometimes referred to as "Weights Reef". The reef covers approximately one hectare and is located 225 metres from the Beach. Like most of the other reefs built to date, the Boscombe Reef was built from large sand-filled geotextile containers. With a total volume of 13,000 m^{3}, the reef was designed purely as a surfing break.

A study undertaken for Bournemouth council shows that prior to the reef there were 77 good surfing days annually, although surfing took place on 153 days, with a total of 5,000 surf visits to Boscombe per year. The intention was that the reef would double the number of good surfing days and it was hoped this would generate 10,000 visits. The original estimate for designing and building the reef was £1.4 million. The eventual cost was £3 million for the reef, and a total of £11 million for the redevelopment of the seafront area and the refurbishment of the pier. This was funded by the sale of a car park on which Barratt Developments constructed the Honeycombe Chine Flats complex, and the sale of Beach Pods which formed part of the Overstrand building.

== Timeline ==
Date	Event
11 Oct 1999	Bournemouth Council approve Feasibility Study
15 Nov 1999	Approval of Feasibility study specification and costs
16 Jun 2000	Bournemouth Council Tourism committee recommend proceeding in Principle
19 Nov 2003	Bournemouth Council Cabinet approve leisure content of Boscombe Spa Village proposals, including the surf reef, and, in principle, the potential full use of the capital receipt from the housing development for the leisure proposals.
06 Nov 2004	Authority given by Councillor Angela Manton, Cabinet Member for Strengthening Our Economy, to procure the Field Studies Data and Initial Design Study for the surf reef through ASR Ltd.
23 Feb 2005	Revised Boscombe Spa Village leisure proposals, following listing of Pier Entrance building, submitted to Cabinet. Cabinet/Council approved the land-based proposals but requested a presentation from ASR Ltd on the initial designreport for the surf reef for the Cabinet to consider.
10 Jan 2007	First Phase of Works begins with the restoration of the Pier
Feb 2007	Permissions for the reef submitted to DEFRA
Jun 2007	Fisherman raise objections with DEFRA
Oct 2007	Approval for the Surf Reef granted by DEFRA
30 Aug 2008	Works starts on Construction by ASR
13 Nov 2008	Work Suspended for Winter
18 Apr 2009	Work Restarts
Sep 2009	Work completed, but opening delayed for safety checks and the right surfing conditions
19 Nov 2009	Reef Declared Officially open
31 Mar 2011	Reef closed for safety reasons. The council said following a scheduled six-monthly inspection, it was advising people not to use the reef while it underwent further work and maintenance, a routine inspection carried out on 23 March showed that "substantial changes" had altered the profile of the reef.
Mid August 2011	Repair work begun by ASR
April 2014	Reef re-branded as Coastal Activity Park concentrating on Diving, Snorkeling, Wind & Kite Surfing as well as on shore sports.

== Construction ==
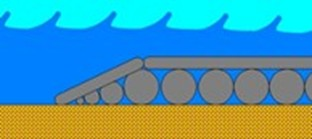
Diagram showing layout of the geotextile bags

The reef, which was originally suggested in the late 1990s, suffered considerable delays before construction finally began in June 2008 by the New Zealand Company ASR Ltd. The geotextile bags were constructed in New Zealand and positioned from a barge. They were then filled with sand which had been stockpiled on the shore from a beach replenishment project (BIS4.2) the previous year. Half of the reef project was completed during the summer of 2008. Construction was suspended for the winter season and resumed the following summer. The reef was officially declared open on the 2 November 2009.

In December 2010 Bournemouth Council announced that ASR would return in the spring of 2011 to make modifications to the reef. Four bags were to be situated on the south-east corner of the reef and a further three pillow bags between existing sections of the reef. The intention is that the wave depth will be improved through the gentler slope thus created, resulting in the right-hand ride length extended to 65metres. ASR will receive £55,000 on completion of this work out of the £150,000 withheld final payment. In April 2011 one bag was removed and another repaired after what was suspected to be propeller damage from an unknown boat colliding with the reef. The reef was closed during the summer of 2011 having been closed for safety reasons in March, in July Bournemouth Councillor Rod Cooper, Cabinet Member for Economy & Tourism announced that ASR ltd would undertake the repair work and begin the improvement work in early August. ASR Ltd began the repair work in mid August 2011. In October 2011 Bournemouth council announced that due to the autumn weather the repair and improvement work would not be completed until spring 2012. ASR went into Liquidation in September 2012. By September 2013 no further work had been undertaken and the reef remained closed. In October 2013 Mark Smith, service director for tourism at Bournemouth Council, was quoted as saying “The council has successfully reached an insurance settlement for the surf reef and so is now undertaking the necessary work to ensure the reef is safe for people to use. This is progressing well and the reef will form an integral part of the Coastal Activity Park, which is scheduled to open in Spring 2014.”. Bournemouth council received £306,531 in respect of two insurance claims for damage to the reef, the council's intention being to repair the reef to its original condition and reopen it in April 2014. The council are registered as an unsecured creditor of ASR for the sum of £14,800.

In November 2013 Mark Smith was further quoted as saying "The Council has made it clear that no additional taxpayers' money will be spent enhancing the reef’s performance for surfing, and that position remains unchanged. Plans include a commercial dive centre, a try-dive facility, and a dive and snorkel trail around the existing reef, with additional submerged artifacts for more experienced divers". Improvements for surfing and body boarding were not to be a priority in the work to be undertaken to make the reef safe.

The area was re-branded as a Coastal Activity Park in April 2014, concentrating on diving, kite and wind surfing, along with on-shore volleyball, table tennis and gym activities.

== Usage ==
In the first 18 months after construction there have been some occasions of good surfing conditions but the general reports from surfers were disappointing. In May 2010 the delayed interim report on the reef's performance from Dr. Mark Davidson of Plymouth University was published; it stated that the reef had only fully achieved four out of eleven of its design objectives. ASR claimed the reef had met most of the design criteria but did agree with the reports conclusion that the waves produced were shorter than the design criteria required:

"The wave length is rather too intense and challenging [and it] is not quite as consistent as it should be."

— Dr. Mark Davidson, Plymouth University, May 2010

Despite the negative press surrounding Boscombe Reef, a group of dedicated local bodyboarders continued to use it regularly before and after its closure for safety reasons.

In November 2014 it was reported that surfers had "given up" on the reef, as it made them "a laughing stock".
