= List of wreck diving sites =

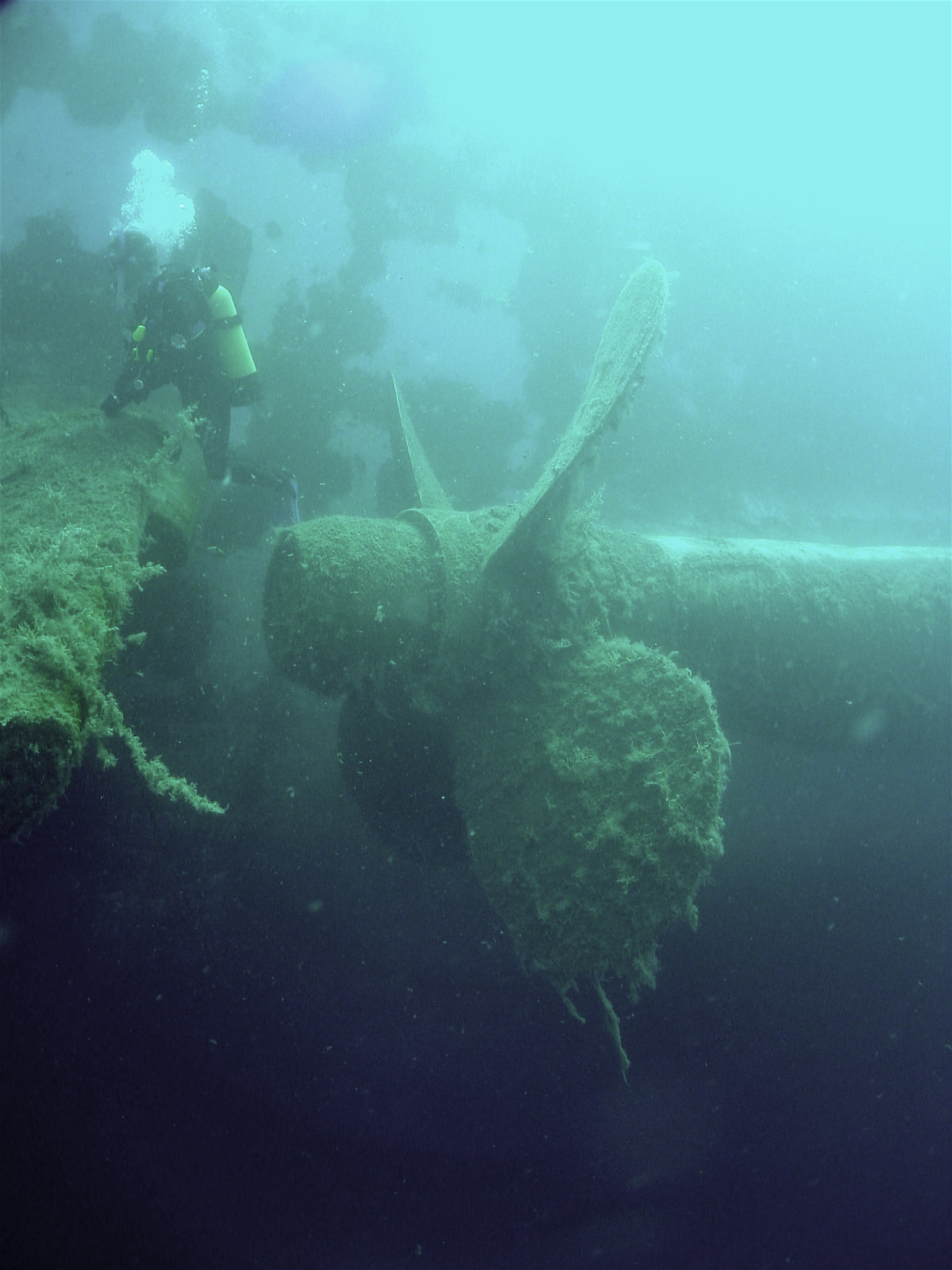
Wreck of the Zenobia.

List of shipwreck sites which are popular amongst scuba divers for wreck diving, arranged by geographical distribution.

== North Atlantic ==
Ireland

- Alondra – English steamer wrecked off Ireland, Baltimore, County Cork

United Kingdom

- HMS A1 – The Royal Navy's first British-designed submarine
- HMS A3 – A-class submarine of the Royal Navy
- Abessinia – German ship wrecked at the Farne Islands in 1921. Now a dive site
- Aeolian Sky – Greek registered freighter sunk off Dorset after a collision
- SS Ajax – Cargo steamship that was built in Germany in 1923
- Albert C. Field – Canadian cargo ship, sunk off the Needles during World War II
- SS Ben Doran – Steam fishing trawler that operated out of Aberdeen
- SS Binnendijk – Dutch cargo steamship sunk by a mine off Portland Bill in the English Channel
- HMS Boadicea – British destroyer, 1930–1944
- SS Breda – Dutch ship sunk off Scotland in 1940
- HMS Coronation – 90-gun second-rate ship of the line of the English Royal Navy
- SMS Dresden – Light cruiser of the German Imperial Navy
- SS Eastfield – Ship sunk off Cornwall in 1917, now a dive site
- HMT Elk – British trawler sunk off Plymouth in 1940
- SS Espagne – Belgian cargo ship sunk in English Channel
- HMS Falmouth – Town-class light cruiser of the Royal Navy
- HMS Ghurka – Tribal-class destroyer of the Royal Navy sunk off Dungeness by a German mine
- Glen Strathallan – British ship scuttled in Plymouth sound as a dive site
- Herzogin Cecilie – German-built four-masted barque wrecked near Salcombe
- Hilma Hooker – Shipwreck in Bonaire in the Caribbean Netherlands
- SS Hispania – Swedish steamship wrecked in the Sound of Mull, now a dive site
- HMS Hood – Royal Sovereign-class battleship of the Royal Navy scuttled in Portland Harbour
- SS James Eagan Layne – Liberty ship sunk off Cornwall, now a dive site
- SMS Kronprinz – Battleship of the German Imperial Navy
- Kyarra – Cargo and passenger luxury liner torpedoed and sunk near Swanage
- HMS Laforey – Royal Navy destroyer sunk by a mine off Sussex
- SS Louis Sheid – Belgian-owned cargo steamship, now a recreational dive site off South Devon
- USS LST-507 – US Tank landing ship sunk off the south coast of England, now a dive site
- HMS M2 – Royal Navy submarine monitor wrecked in Lyme Bay
- SS Maine – British ship sunk in 1917 near Dartmouth, Devon. Now a recreational dive site
- SS Maloja – UK registered passenger steamship sunk by a mine off Dover
- Marguerite – French ship sunk in Lyme Bay in 1917. Now a dive site
- SMS Markgraf – Battleship of the German Imperial Navy
- SS Mendi – Passenger steamship that sank after a collision south of the Isle of Wight
- RMS Moldavia – British ship sunk in 1918 off Beachy Head, now a dive site
- HMS Montagu – Pre-dreadnought battleship of the British Royal Navy
- MV RMS Mulheim – German owned container ship wrecked at Land's End, Cornwall
- SS Oceana – Cargo and passenger ship sunk off Beachy Head after a collision
- MS Oslofjord – Ocean liner sunk after hitting a mine off the River Tyne
- SS Persier – British ship sunk in Plymouth Sound in 1945. Now a dive site
- MS Piłsudski – Polish passenger ship sunk off the Yorkshire coast
- MV Pool Fisher – British merchant vessel that sank off the Isle of Wight
- HMS Port Napier – British World War II auxiliary minesweeper that caught fire and exploded
- Preußen – German ship built in 1902
- SS Radaas – Ship sunk in 1917 near Portland Bill, now a dive site
- SS Rondo – Ship sunk in Sound of Mull in 1935, now a recreational dive site
- SS Rosehill – Steam collier torpedoed and sunk near Fowey, Cornwall
- SS Rotorua – New Zealand Shipping Company steam ocean liner and refrigerated cargo ship
- Royal Adelaide – Iron sailing ship wrecked on Chesil Beach
- Royal Charter – Steam clipper wrecked off Anglesey, UK
- HMS Safari – Royal Navy S-class submarine which served in World War II
- HMS Scylla – 22nd Leander-class frigate of the Royal Navy, Cornwall, United Kingdom
- HMS Sidon – Royal Navy submarine sunk in Portland Harbour by explosion of a faulty torpedo
- Stanegarth – Steam tugboat scuttled as a dive feature at Stoney Cove
- SS Stanwood – Cargo steamship wreck and recreational dive site
- SS Stella – Passenger ferry wrecked off the Casquets in 1899
- SS Stepas Darius – Liberty ship built in the United States during World War II
- SS Thesis – Steamship wrecked in 1889 in the Sound of Mull, Scotland
- SS Torrey Canyon – Oil tanker wrecked off the coast of Cornwall
- U-40 – German submarine sunk by a mine in the English Channel
- U-1195 – German World War II submarine
- SS Varvassi – Greek freighter wrecked at The Needles in a storm after engine failure
- SS Walter L M Russ – German freighter wrecked in St George's Channel
- List of shipwrecks of the Isles of Scilly, Cornwall

United States

- USS Aeolus – Attack cargo ship converted into a cable repair ship
- SS Andrea Doria – Italian ocean liner that sank in 1956 , Nantucket Sound. This dive is becoming less common, as the rapid deterioration of the wreck is making diving more difficult on top of the already treacherous dive to reach the vessel.
- SS Arratoon Apcar – 19th-century British steamship that is now a wreck in Florida
- SMS Geier – Unprotected cruiser of the German Imperial Navy
- USNS General Hoyt S. Vandenberg – US Navy transport ship sunk as artificial reef at Key West

=== Caribbean Sea ===
Aruba

- MS Antilla – Hamburg America Line cargo ship scuttled in 1940 off Aruba
- SS Pedernales – Lake tanker damaged by a torpedo at Aruba, part of the ships remains as dive site

Bonaire

- Hilma Hooker – Shipwreck in Bonaire in the Caribbean Netherlands

British Virgin Islands

- RMS Rhone – Royal Mail Ship wrecked off Salt Island in the British Virgin Islands in a hurricane

Cayman Islands

- MV Captain Keith Tibbetts – Class of Soviet anti-submarine frigates

Curaçao

- Superior Producer,

Grenada

- MV Bianca C. – Passenger ship sunk off Grenada

Mexico

- Felipe Xicoténcatl – Admirable class minesweeper sunk as an artificial reef off Cozumel

Mustique

- SS Antilles – French cruise ship that ran aground and sank off Mustique

=== Florida ===
- Eagle, Islamorada, Florida
- USNS General Hoyt S. Vandenberg, Key West, Florida
- USS Oriskany, Pensacola, Florida
- USS Spiegel Grove, Florida Keys, Florida
- USCGS Bibb, Florida Keys, Florida
- USCGS Duane, Florida Keys, Florida
- USCGC Blackthorn, Tampa Bay, Florida

=== Mediterranean Sea ===
Adriatic

- SMS Zenta
- SS Tiffany

Cyprus

- Constandis
- Lady Thetis
- Zenobia

Italy

- Haven

Malta

- Cominoland
- Imperial Eagle
- Karwela
- HMS Maori
- P29
- P31
- Rozi
- St. Michael
- Tug No. 10
- Tug No. 2
- Um El Faroud
- X127
- Xlendi

Greece

- HMS Britanic

=== North Carolina, Outer Banks ===
- U-352
- USS Monitor
- USS Tarpon
- USS Yancey
- USS Schurz (SMS Geier)
- USCGC Spar
- USS Indra
- SS Papoose
- USS Aeolus
- SS Dixie Arrow

=== Scapa Flow, Scotland ===
- SMS Markgraf

== South Atlantic ==
=== Brazil ===
- Pirapama, Vapor Bahia, Corveta Camacuã and other wrecks in Recife;Corveta Ipiranga in Fernando de Noronha; Buenos Aires at Rio de Janeiro; other wrecks along the coast of Brazil

== East Pacific ==
- Wreck Alley, San Diego, California

== West Pacific ==
- HMAS Adelaide, New South Wales, Australia
- HMAS Brisbane, Queensland, Australia
- SS Yongala, Queensland, Australia
- HMAS Canberra, Victoria, Australia
- USAT Liberty, Tulamben, Bali, Indonesia
- MS Mikhail Lermontov, New Zealand
- Rainbow Warrior, New Zealand
- HMNZS Wellington, New Zealand
- Toa Maru, Solomon Islands
- SS President Coolidge, Vanuatu

=== Bikini Atoll ===
- USS Saratoga (CV-3) - aircraft carrier
- USS Arkansas (BB-33) - battleship
- USS Gilliam (APA-57) - attack transport
- USS Carlisle (APA-69) - attack transport
- USS Lamson (DD-367) - destroyer
- USS Anderson (DD-411) - destroyer
- USS Apogon (SS-308) - submarine
- USS Pilotfish (SS-386) - submarine
- Japanese battleship Nagato - battleship
- Japanese cruiser Sakawa - light cruiser

=== Guam ===
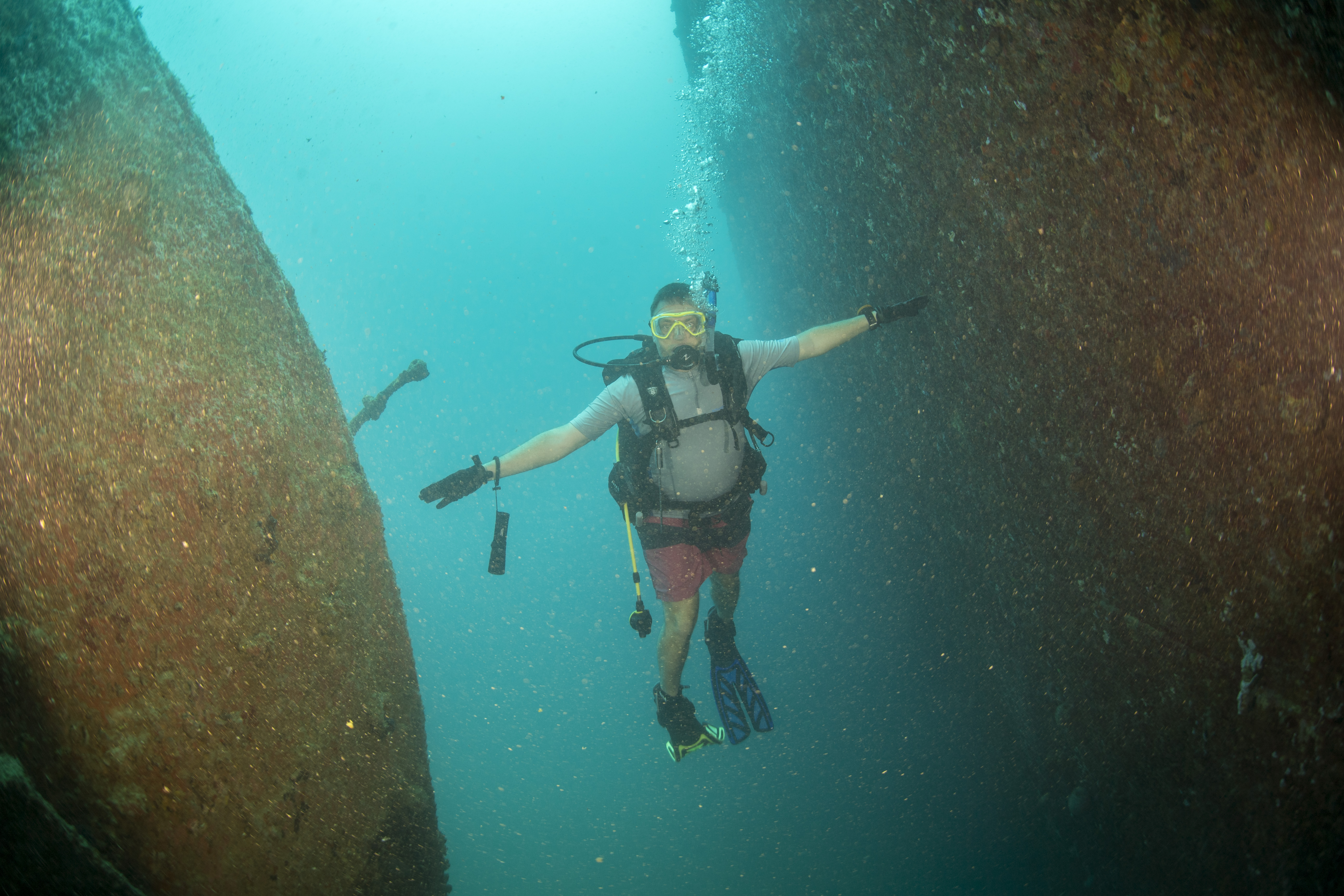
Diver between the hulls of Cormoran and Tokai Maru in Apra Harbor, Guam

- American Tanker, WWII American concrete barge in Apra Harbor
- Aratama Maru, a WWII Japanese military transport in Talofofo Bay
- SMS Cormoran (1914), WWI German merchant raider in Apra Harbor
- Kitsugawa Maru, a WWII Japanese transport in Apra Harbor
- Tokai Maru, WWII Japanese passenger-cargo ship in Apra Harbor

== Indian Ocean ==
- Al Munassir, Muscat, Oman
- HMS Hermes, Sri Lanka
- Inket Wreck, World War II Japanese shipwreck, Andaman Islands, India

=== Red Sea ===
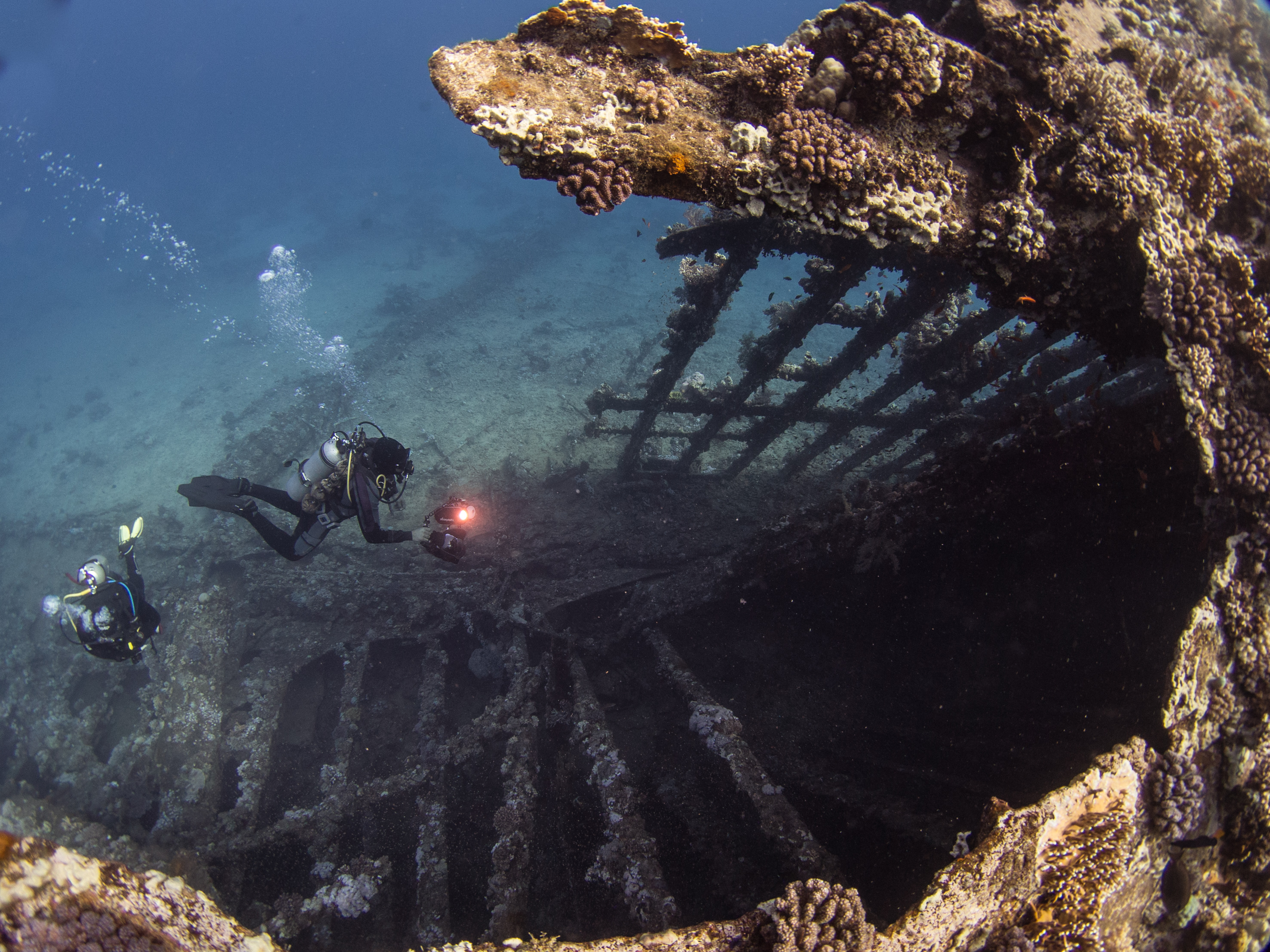
Wreck of the SS Carnatic

- SS Thistlegorm, Egypt
- SS Carnatic, Egypt
- Salem Express, Egypt
- Giannis D, Egypt
- Rosalie Moller, Egypt
- INS Sufa, Israel
- The Umbria Wreck, Sudan (an Italian vessel which sank or was scuttled on June 9, 1940).
- The Toyota Wreck (Blue Belt Wreck), Sudan (a cargo ship containing Toyota vehicles which, in 1977, collided with Sha'ab Suedi Reef).
- The Continental Shelf Station Two (Conshelf II), Sudan (the remains of an underwater habitat constructed between 1962 and 1965 by the French oceanographer Jacques-Yves Cousteau).

== Freshwater Shipwrecks ==
=== Great Lakes ===
- List of shipwrecks in the Thunder Bay National Marine Sanctuary
- RMS Empress of Ireland, Saint Lawrence River
- SS America, Lake Superior
- SS Carl D. Bradley, Lake Michigan
- SS Cedarville, Lake Huron
- SS D.R.Hanna, Lake Huron
- SS Eber Ward, Lake Michigan
- SS Ironsides, Lake Michigan
- SS Isaac M. Scott, Lake Huron
- SS Pewabic, Lake Huron
- SS Milwaukee, Lake Michigan
- SS Regina, Lake Huron
- SS Vienna, Lake Superior

== See also ==
- Artificial reef – Human-made underwater structure that functions as a reef
- Lists of shipwrecks
- Sinking ships for wreck diving sites – Scuttling old ships to produce artificial reefs
