= Sinking ships for wreck diving sites =

Scuttling old ships to produce artificial reefs

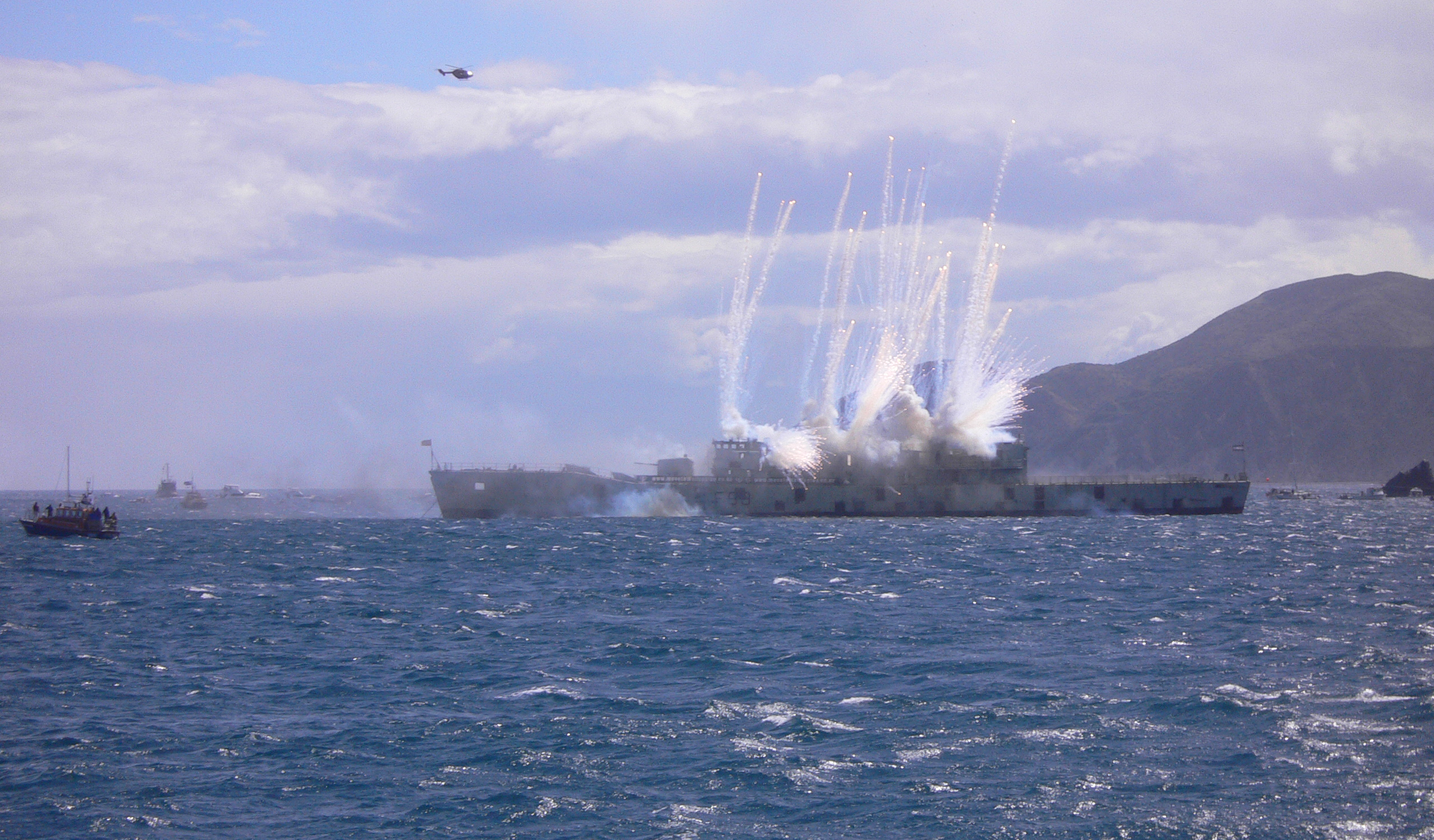
Explosives detonating to sink the former HMNZS Wellington (F69) in 2005

Sinking ships for wreck diving sites is the practice of scuttling old ships to produce artificial reefs suitable for wreck diving, to benefit from commercial revenues from recreational diving of the shipwreck, or to produce a diver training site.

To avoid undesirable ecological impact, and to maximise utility, the vessel should be selected and prepared, and the site chosen, with due consideration to the local environment.

== Preparation ==
To prepare a hulk for sinking as a wreck site, several things must be done to make it safe for the marine environment and divers. To protect the environment, the ship is purged of all oils, hydraulic fluids, and dangerous chemicals such as PCBs. Much of the superstructure may be removed to prevent the hazard of it eventually caving in from corrosion. Similarly, the interior of the ship is gutted of components that corrode quickly, and would be dangerous to divers if they came loose. The ship is thoroughly cleaned, often with the help of volunteers interested in diving. A significant part of the cost of preparing and sinking the ship may be recovered from scrapping the contents of the ship, including valuable materials such as copper wiring. The hulk's suitability as a diving site may be enhanced by cutting openings in its hull and interior bulkheads, and removing doors and hatch covers to allow divers access at reduced risk.

== Choice of site ==
Several factors influence the choice of site for recreational diving purposes, and these should take into consideration the possibly conflicting economic and ecological considerations.

- The wreck should not create a significant hazard to navigation.
- For maximum accessibility and diver safety, a shallow site in protected waters is preferred.
  - To reduce cost of access, the site should be near to a suitable harbour or launching site, in a region where existing or planned recreational diving infrastructure is available.
  - There may be a conflict of interests between groups which may profit from access to the wreck.
- Sites further offshore make shore dives impracticable or dangerous.
- Deeper water reduces access to less qualified divers, but increases risk for all divers.
- More protected waters reduce risk to all divers and increase the useful lifespan of the wreck as a diving attraction.
- Placement of the wreck will do some ecological damage. An ecological impact assessment should indicate acceptable long term consequences.
- The site will influence the marine organisms that will colonise the wreckage, and the rate at which they will grow. Some may be more desirable at a dive site than others.
- The site will influence the rate of silt deposition in and on the wreckage, which will affect safety and the local ecology.

== Sinking ==
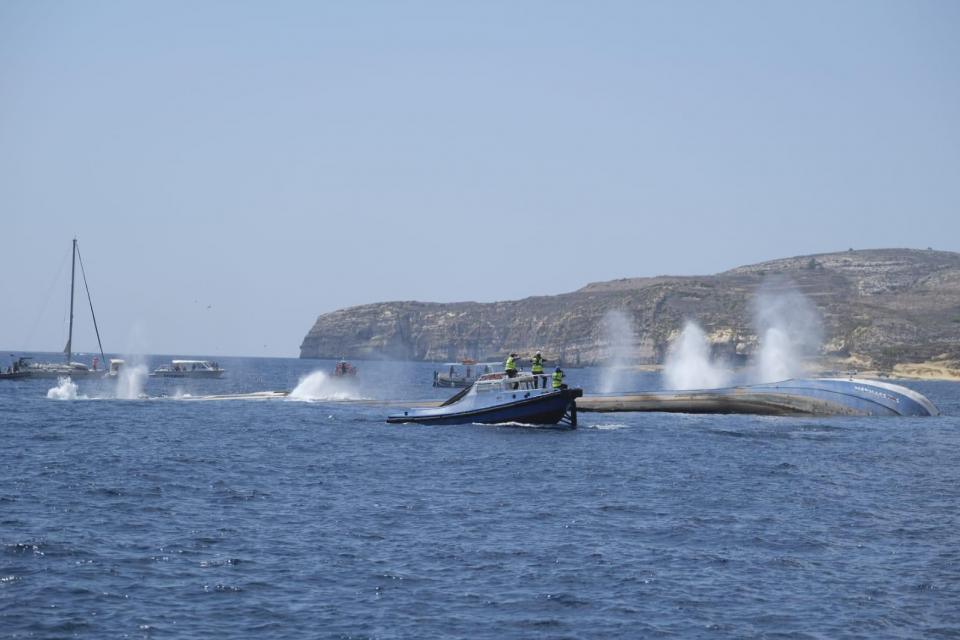
Scuttling of MT Hephaestus off Xatt l-Aħmar, Gozo, Malta on 29 August 2022

The preparation phase usually removes a significant amount of weight, so the ship floats higher in the water than normal. This may make it necessary to stabilise the vessel by filling some compartments with water as makeshift ballast tanks to prevent excessive rolling in port or during towing. The ship is towed to the sinking location, usually in waters shallow enough to allow access by numerous divers, but deep enough to be relatively unaffected by surface weather conditions. The ship is usually scuttled using shaped explosives, in a controlled demolition. The holes may be blown so that the heavier engine room and stern floods first, then the rest of the hull. The aim is to sink the ship in an upright position.

== Reception ==
The sinking of ships as recreational dive sites can provide wreck diving opportunities where they previously did not exist, and can provide wrecks which are particularly suitable for penetration by less skilled and experienced divers, when they have been prepared for the purpose by removing potential hazards and contents which would contaminate the site or region. However, some divers see them as artificial, less interesting and less challenging, and prefer to explore the relatively unknown or mysterious surroundings of historic and significant wrecks which occurred outside planned scuttling events, considering them to be more authentic. Scuttling programs may relieve more culturally significant wreckage from overexploitation, particularly incidental damage by less competent divers, but do not remove the threat of illegal intentional damage by removal of artifacts by wreck-robbers, who will target wrecks where there are more likely to be artifacts worth stealing.

== List of ships sunk for wreck diving ==
Ships sunk for wreck diving
Year	Vessel name	Location	Country/territory
1942/1984	Scirè	Haifa, Israel	Israel
1944	Jun'yō Maru	Samalona Island, South Sulawesi	Indonesia
1968	USS Mizpah	Palm Beach, Florida	United States
1970	Glen Strathallen	Plymouth Sound	United Kingdom
1970	Mohawk	Wrightsville Beach, North Carolina	United States
1972	USS Fred T. Berry	Key West, Florida	United States
1974	SS Theodore Parker	North Carolina	United States
1975	USS Mona Island	Wachapreague, Virginia	United States
1978	USS Dionysus	North Carolina	United States
1980	Oro Verde		Cayman Islands
1980	USS Harlequin	Isla Mujeres	Mexico
1980	USS Mindanao	Daytona Beach, Florida	United States
1982	USS Scrimmage	Waianae, Hawaii	United States
1982	MS Logna	Grand Bahama Island	Bahamas
1983	USS Curb	Key West, Florida	United States
1985	Eagle	Florida	United States
1987	USS Accokeek	Gulf of Mexico	United States
1987	USS Strength	Panama City, Florida	United States
1987	Rainbow Warrior	Matauri Bay	New Zealand
1987	USCGC Duane	Florida	United States
1987	USCGC Bibb	Florida	United States
1987–2000	Wreck Alley	San Diego, California	United States
1988	USS Vermilion	Myrtle Beach, South Carolina	United States
1988	USCGC Unimak	Virginia	United States
1988	USS Rankin	Stuart, Florida	United States
1988	USS Aeolus	North Carolina	United States
1989	USS Muliphen	Port St. Lucie, Florida	United States
1989	USS Blenny	Ocean City, Maryland	United States
1989	YO-257	Oahu, Hawaii	United States
1990	USS Yancey	Morehead City, North Carolina	United States
1990	USS Chippewa	Destin, Florida	United States
1990	T-Barge	Durban	South Africa
1990	USCG Hollyhock	Florida	United States
1990	Fontao	Durban	South Africa
1991	MV G.B. Church	British Columbia	Canada
1991–2001	"Wreck Alley" – Marie L, Pat and Beata		British Virgin Islands
1991	USS Algol	New Jersey	United States
1992	MV Rozi	Ċirkewwa	Malta
1992	USS Indra	North Carolina	United States
1992	HMCS Chaudière	British Columbia	Canada
1994	HMCS Saguenay	Nova Scotia	Canada
1994	SAS Pietermaritzburg, formerly HMS Pelorus	Miller's Point, Western Cape	South Africa
1994	HMAS Derwent	Rottnest Island	Australia
1994	INS Sufa	Eilat, Israel	Israel
1995	MV Jean Escutia	Puerto Morelos	Mexico
1995	HMCS Mackenzie	British Columbia	Canada
1996	Inganess Bay		British Virgin Islands
1996	MV Captain Keith Tibbetts (formerly Russian-built frigate 356)	Cayman Brac	Cayman Islands
1996	HMCS Columbia	British Columbia	Canada
1997	HMAS Swan	Dunsborough, Western Australia	Australia
1997	HMCS Saskatchewan	British Columbia	Canada
1998	Tug No. 10	Marsaskala	Malta
1998	St. Michael	Marsaskala	Malta
1998	Um El Faroud	Qrendi	Malta
1998	MV Adolphus Busch	Looe Key, Florida	United States
1999	MV Xlendi	Gozo	Malta
1999	HMNZS Tui	Tutukaka Heads	New Zealand
1999	USS Scuffle	Cozumel	Mexico
1999	MV Imperial Eagle	Qawra	Malta
2000	Stanegarth	Stoney Cove	United Kingdom
2000	HMCS Yukon	San Diego, California	United States
2000	USS Fort Marion	Hai Tzu Kuo, Xiaoliuqiu	Taiwan
2000	USS Knave	Puerto Morales	Mexico
2000	HMNZS Waikato	Tutukaka	New Zealand
2001	USS Jubilant	Veracruz	Mexico
2001	HMCS Cape Breton	British Columbia	Canada
2001	HMAS Perth	Albany, Western Australia	Australia
2002	HMAS Hobart	Yankalilla Bay, South Australia	Australia
2002	USS Spiegel Grove	Florida	United States
2002	MV Dania	Mombasa	Kenya
2003	HTMS Khram (L-732)	Ko Phai	Thailand
2003	USS Leonard F. Mason	Chaikou, Green Island	Taiwan
2003	HMCS Nipigon	Quebec	Canada
2003	CS Charles L Brown	Sint Eustatius	Leeward Islands
2003	MV Camia 2	Boracay island	Philippines
2004	HMS Scylla	Whitsand Bay, Cornwall	United Kingdom
2004	USCGC Spar	Morehead City, North Carolina	United States
2004	Hebat Allah	Hurghada, Red Sea	Egypt
2005	HMAS Brisbane	Mooloolaba, Queensland	Australia
2005	HMNZS Wellington	Wellington	New Zealand
2006	Xihwu Boeing 737	British Columbia	Canada
2006	USS Oriskany (CV-34)	Florida	United States
2006	HTMS Kut (L-731)	Pattaya	Thailand
2006	MV Karwela	Gozo	Malta
2006	MV Cominoland	Gozo	Malta
2007	P29	Ċirkewwa	Malta
2007	USTS Texas Clipper	South Padre Island, Texas	United States
2007	HMNZS Canterbury	Bay of Islands	New Zealand
2007	USS Cruise	Delaware Bay	United States
2009	USNS General Hoyt S. Vandenberg	Key West, Florida	United States
2009	P31	Comino	Malta
2009	HMAS Canberra	Barwon Heads, Victoria	Australia
2011	USS Kittiwake (ASR-13)	West Bay, Grand Cayman	Cayman Islands
2011	HMAS Adelaide	Avoca Beach, New South Wales	Australia
2011	HTMS Prab (LCI-741)	Chumphon	Thailand
2011	HTMS Sattakut (LCI-742)	Koh Tao	Thailand
2011	USS Arthur W. Radford	Cape May, New Jersey	United States
2012	USCGC Mohawk	Lee County, Florida	United States
2012	HTMS Mataphon (LCT-761)	Ko Larn	Thailand
2012	HTMS Phetra (LCT-764)	Ko Man Nok	Thailand
2012	NRP Oliveira e Carmo (F489)	Algarve	Portugal
2012	NRP Zambeze (P1147)	Algarve	Portugal
2012	HTMS Chang, formerly USS Lincoln County	Ko Chang	Thailand
2013	NRP Hermenegildo Capelo (F481)	Algarve	Portugal
2013	NRP Almeida Carvalho (A527)	Algarve	Portugal
2013	T11 Coastal Patrol Ship	Ko Chang	Thailand
2013	Tug No. 2	Sliema	Malta
2014	HTMS Kledkaeo (AKS-861)	Phi Phi Islands	Thailand
2014	MV Ærøsund	South Fionan Sea	Denmark
2015	HMCS Annapolis	British Columbia	Canada
2015	USS Comstock	Checheng Township, Pingtung	Taiwan
2015	ARM Uribe (P121)	Rosarito Beach, Baja California	Mexico
2016	General Pereira D´Eça F477	Porto Santo, Madeira	Portugal
2016	Vis	Kamenjak, Istra	Croatia
2017	USCGC Tamaroa (WMEC-166)	Cape May, New Jersey	United States
2017	Fishing Trawler, Gal'Oz	Hertzliya, Israel	Israel
2018	HMAS Tobruk (L 50)	Queensland	Australia
2021	P33	Marsaskala	Malta
2022	MT Hephaestus	Xatt l-Aħmar	Malta
2023	NRTL Kamenassa (P217)	K41	East Timor
2026	SS United States	Gulf of Mexico	United States

== See also ==
- Artificial Reef Society of British Columbia – Canadian non-profit to create artificial reefs for habitat enhancement and recreation
- Rigs-to-Reefs – Artificial reefs from old oil rigs
- Archaeology of shipwrecks – Study of human activity through the analysis of shipwreck artifacts
- Diver training – Processes to develop the skills and knowledge to dive safely underwater
- Environmental impact of recreational diving – Effects of scuba diving on the underwater environment
- Lists of shipwrecks
- List of wreck diving sites
- Scuba diving tourism – Industry based on recreational diver travel
- Wreck Alley – Area off California with several wrecks sunk as artificial reefs
- Wreck diving – Recreational diving on wrecks
