= MS Logna =

Ship sunk as artificial reef in the Bahamas

Coordinates: 26°28′17″N 78°41′08″W

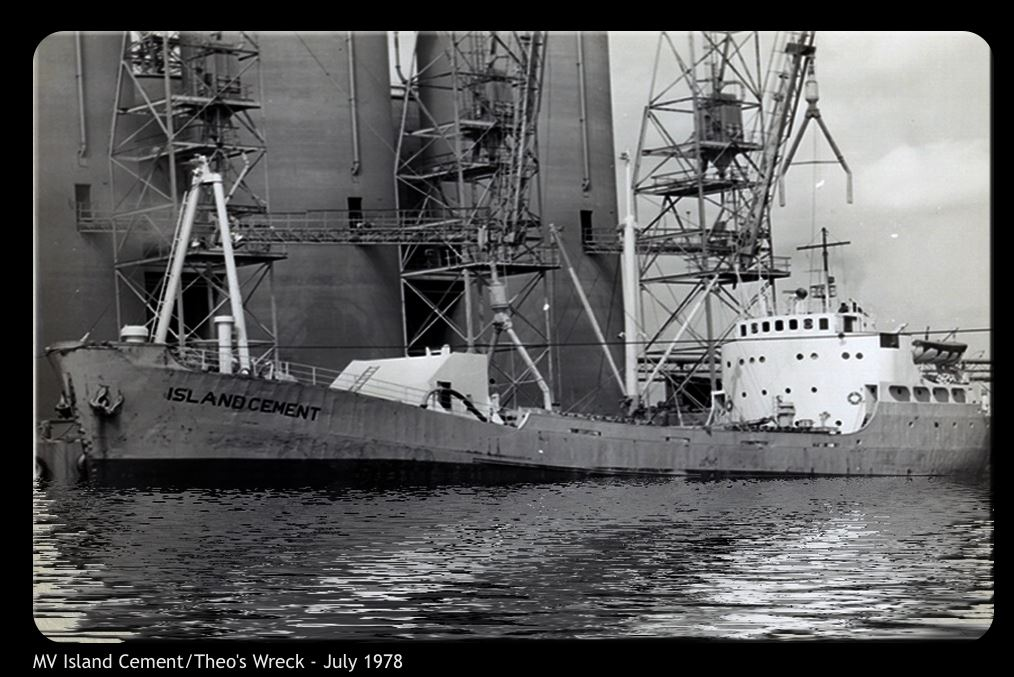
- MV Island Cement at Bahama Cement Company Loading Dock in 1978

History
- Name: Logna
- Port of registry: Liverpool UK
- Builder: Bergens Mekaniske Verksted Shipyard, Norway
- Yard number: 435
- Launched: 6 February 1958
- Completed: June 1958
- In service: 1958-1969
- Name: Island Cement
- Owner: Bahama Cement Company, GBI
- Operator: Bahama Cement Company, GBI
- Port of registry: Nassau, Bahamas
- Route: Bahamas inter-island and East Coast of Florida
- Acquired: 1969
- In service: 1959-1981
- Out of service: 1982
- Fate: Scuttled on 16 October 1982
- Status: Artificial reef and recreational dive site
- Notes: Current position, Lat: 26.477949 Lng: 78.691635

General characteristics
- Class & type: Lloyd's of London
- Type: Self discharge, bulk cement carrier
- Tonnage: 1,444 GRT; 1,555 DWT
- Length: 229 ft (70 m)
- Beam: 35 ft (11 m)
- Draught: 15 ft (4.6 m)
- Depth: 20 ft (6.1 m)
- Decks: 1
- Installed power: GMB 8, 960 BHP
- Propulsion: Single, 4-bladed screw 6.75 ft (2.06 m)
- Speed: 11.75 knots
- Crew: British & Bahamian

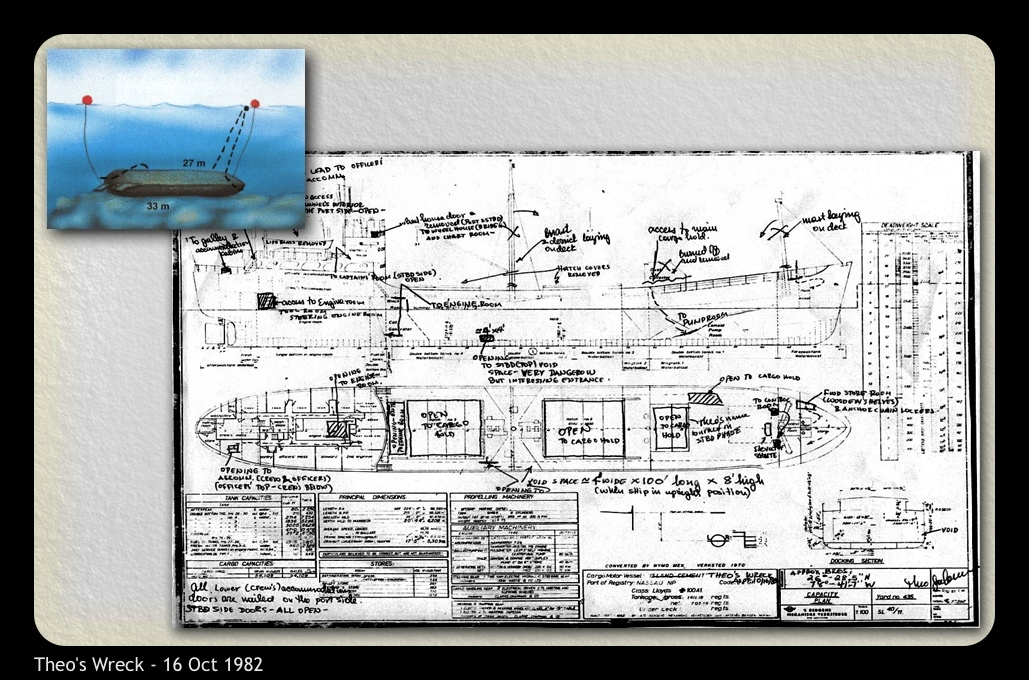
MV Island Cement (Theo's Wreck) general arrangement plan

MV Logna was built as general cargo ship in Bergens Mekaniske Verksted, Shipyard, Norway in 1958. She transported cargo between Norway and Spain until 1969, when she was acquired by the Bahama Cement Company. In 1970, she was converted to a bulk cement carrier and she was renamed MV Island Cement. She was used to ship bulk cement between Freeport, Bahamas, Fort Pierce, Port Canaveral, and Fort Lauderdale, Florida, and to Eleuthera and New Providence in the Bahamas. In 1980, the Company conducted an underwater survey and determined that it was not economical to perform required repairs. Instead, the ship was decommissioned and the company planned to sell her for scrap.

The company's port engineer and underwater sports enthusiast Theo (Thanassis) Galanopoulos instead persuaded the company to scuttle the ship as a dive site. After several months of preparation with the assistance of local volunteers and the issuance of a permit by the Government of the Bahamas, the MV Island Cement was towed about 1.5 miles off Williamstown, Grand Bahama Island and scuttled on 16 October 1982. The MV Island Cement became the first ship intentionally sunk as artificial reef and recreational dive site in the Bahamas; the site was named "Theo's Wreck"

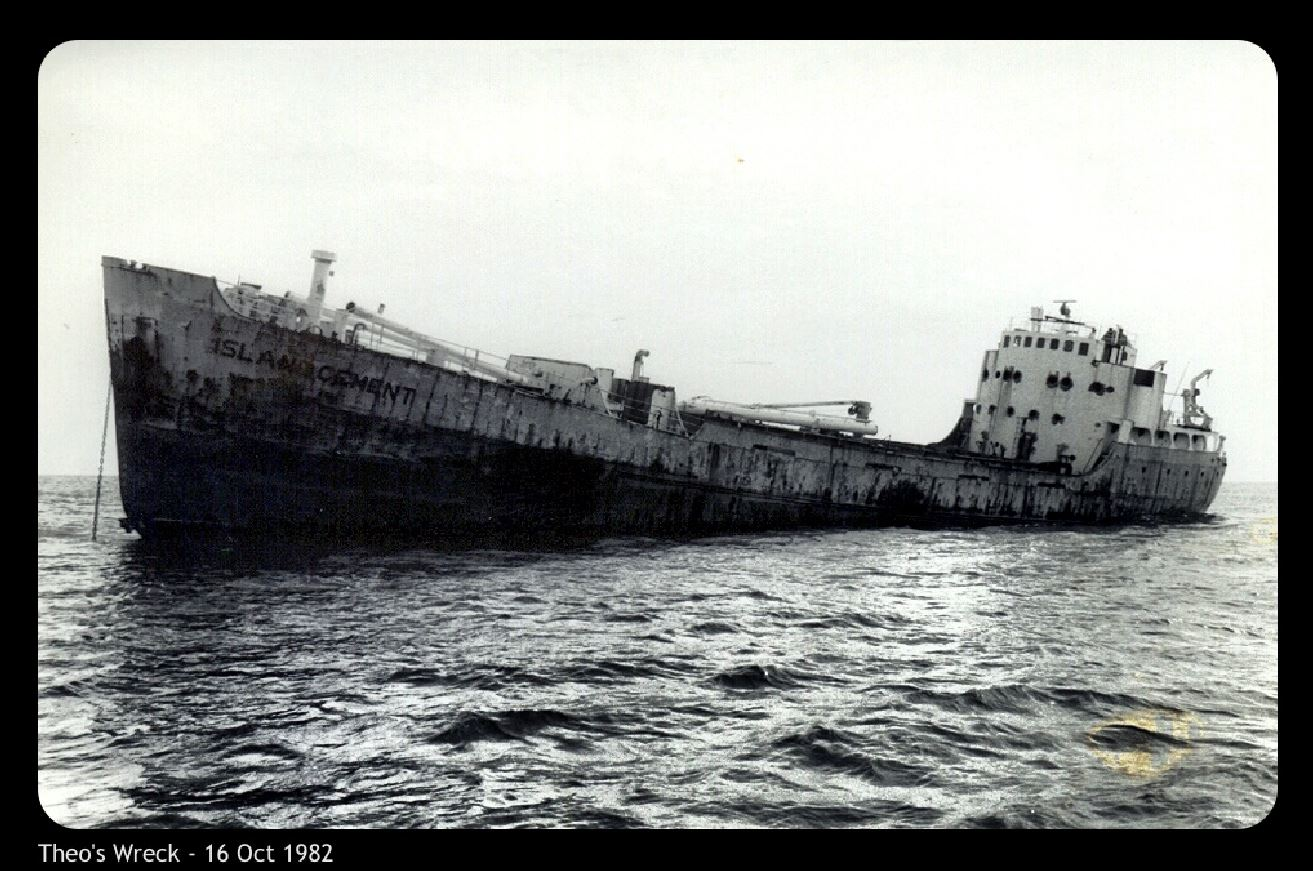

Theo's Wreck is 229 ft (70 m) long and 10.670 ft (3.252 m) and rests on her port side at depth of 103 ft (31 m) at MLT, and about 50 ft (15 m) feet from the island's continental shelf. It is approximately two miles offshore of Xanadu Beach Resort & Marina. Two buoys mark the location of "Theo's Wreck". Since 1982, the ship has become home to much marine life.

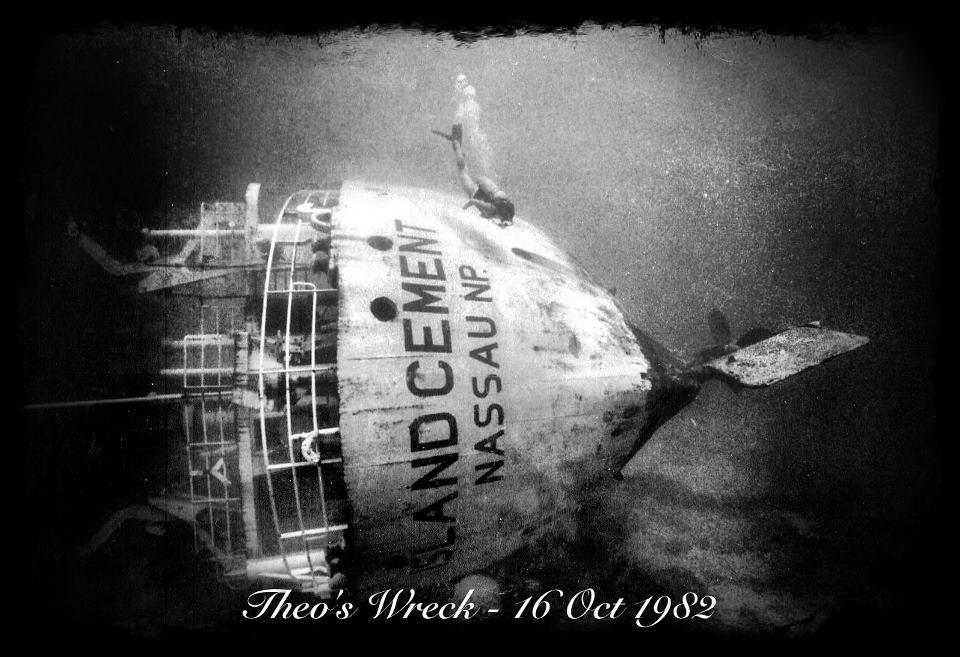
