= Constandis (wreck) =

Fishing vessel sunk as a recreational dive site in Limassol Bay, Cyprus

Coordinates: 34.645°N 33.033°E

Constandis was a fishing vessel sunk for use as a recreational dive site in Limassol Bay, Cyprus.

Constandis, originally operated as a bottom trawler, was built in the Soviet Union in 1989. Her Russian name was Zolotets. She was registered at the Register of Cyprus Ships in 1997 and operated in international waters in the eastern Mediterranean Sea for a short period of time.

Constandis was sunk off Limassol in February 2014 along with the passenger ship Lady Thetis. Constandis sits in approximately 24.3 metres (80 ft) of water and has some great things to view on the outside. There are also some easy penetration options for divers who are more adventurous.

== Dive site details ==
Access: Whilst close to the marina adjacent to the Crowne Plaza Hotel, a vessel is required to complete the transit to the site.
Expected depth: 24.3 metres (80 ft)
Bottom characteristics: Sandy/Silty
Max depth in area: <30 metres (98 ft)
Alternate site: Three stars/Paphos/Latchi

Particular risks:

- Traffic protection - High
- Narcosis - Low
- Decompression - Moderate
- Increased air consumption - High
- Limited time - Low
- Poor visibility - Moderate
- Separation - High
- Entanglement - Moderate
- Entrapment and sharps – High
- Dehydration/Sun burn/Exposure – High
- Penetration - Low
