= Wreck Alley =

Area off California with several wrecks sunk as artificial reefs

Coordinates: 32°46′0″N 117°17′12″W

Wreck Alley is an area a few miles off the coast of Mission Beach, San Diego, California with several ships intentionally sunk as artificial reefs and as Scuba diving attractions for wreck divers.

== Wrecks ==
Six of these were intentionally sunk.

- Ruby E. – Coast Guard cutter
- El Rey – kelp harvester
- Yukon – a Canadian navy ship
- Shooter's Fantasy
- Barge #1
- Strider
- NOSC Tower – a research and communication platform that collapsed during a storm
- P-38

== Description ==
Wreck Alley is an artificial reef and recreational diving destination off the coast of San Diego . In addition to the artificial reef created by multiple shipwrecks, the area also includes submerged ocean platforms and remains of the old Ingraham Street Bridge.

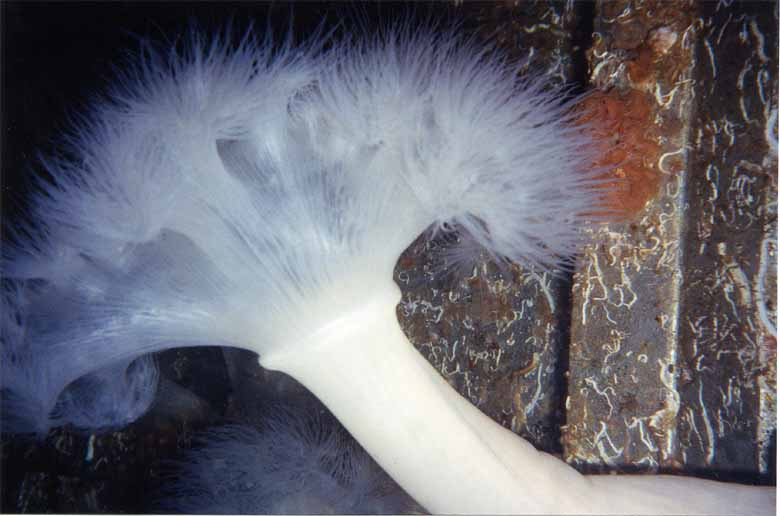
Metridium Anemone on the wreck of HMCS Yukon

These different sunken structures make artificial reefs well positioned in the cold nutrient rich currents. Filter feeders compete for room to anchor themselves. Most prevalent are Corynactis californica anemones. The other most common species is the large, snow white Metridium anemone. There are numerous other species on the wrecks, including other anemones, scallops, barnacles, tunicates, zoanthids, crabs, starfish, brittle stars, nudibranchs, fish and other species.

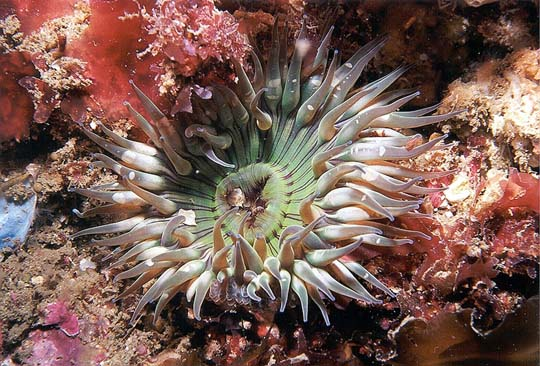
Aggregating Anemone

Another dive in Wreck Alley is the Ingraham Street Bridge. When Mission Bay was developed and the old bridge was replaced, all its parts were taken out and dumped in about 60 feet of water. Some areas of the structure that are more in the current, have an encrusting of filter feeders like the wrecks, but much of it is like most natural reefs with kelps, fans and algae growing over it. Since there is more cover here, there are a lot more fish here than at the wrecks, especially at night. Wreck Alley is a good place to look for lobster in the beginning of the season as well.

Most of the wrecks are well marked with surface buoys.

== The Yukon ==
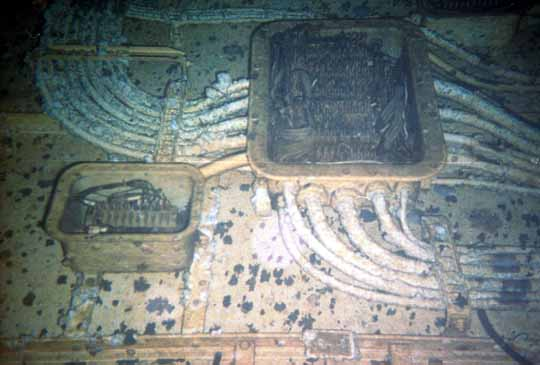
Electrical Panel in the Yukon wreck

Yukon - Canadian Mackenzie Class Destroyer

- Length: 366 Feet - 111 Meters
- Breadth: 42 Feet - 13 Meters
- Tons: 2380
- Built: 1959;
- Hull Construction: Steel
- Date of Sinking: July 14, 2000
- GPS Coordinates: 32 46.80N 117 17.12W
- Depth: 68 Feet (Highest point at stern) to 105 Feet (Lowest point at bow)
- Position: on Port side

The Yukon was purchased by the San Diego Oceans Foundation for the purpose of sinking in Wreck Alley. Volunteers spent an enormous amount of time and energy cleaning the wreck and preparing it as a safe dive site for divers of many levels. Holes were cut into the hull for easy access to exits throughout the entire ship. From inside the wreck, the openings to the outside look like green video screens. It is the newest wreck so it is the most intact wreck at Wreck Alley. Originally it was prepared so that there was one long corridor, called the Grand Promenade, that went the length of the ship along the port side.

For publicity before its sinking, a large game of Sink My Battleship was held. The winner got the privilege of pushing the button that would scuttle the ship. Unfortunately, the night before, a wind came up and the ship sank on its own. Also quite unfortunately, it fell on its port side, putting the Grand Promenade at 105 feet and making it an advanced dive instead of an intermediate dive as was planned. The Yukon was not a cargo ship, it was designed to carry a crew - its bulkheads and low decks form a maze of narrow passages and small compartments. Divers need to be careful as a lot of sand and silt has entered the wreck.

== The Ruby E ==
The Ruby E - Coast Guard Cutter

- Length: 165 Feet
- Breadth: 382 Feet
- Tons: 150
- Built: 1934;
- Hull Construction: Steel
- Date of Sinking: 1989
- Depth: 85 Feet
- Coordinates: 117 16'36" W, 32 46'02" N
- Position: Upright

The Ruby E is the 165-foot Coast Guard Cutter Cyane, built in 1934 in Seattle, Washington and designed for the enforcement of Prohibition.

During World War II, The Ruby E conducted anti-submarine and search and rescue patrols. She also served as an escort for convoys, mostly along the West Coast of the United States. Sold in 1954, she served as a fish-processing vessel. Sold again, the ship was renamed the Ruby E and outfitted as a salvage vessel. Her new owners ran into financial difficulties and could not repay their bank loans. The Ruby E was seized as a bank repossession and sat in San Diego harbor until it was purchased by the San Diego Tug and Barge Company. In 1989, the Ruby E was intentionally sunk as an artificial reef at Wreck Alley off the coast of San Diego.

The Ruby E has a number of easy penetration points, but should be entered only with experience and caution. The easiest point to enter is the wheelhouse, which has round portholes. The other interesting point in the wreck is the engine room, with two large diesel engines. The heads are off, exposing the large valve and rocker mechanisms. Ruby E sits upright and intact on the bottom with only the slightest list to the port side. All areas of the wreck except the bilge are easily accessible. The bow of the Ruby E points in a northerly direction and lies in about 90 feet of water.

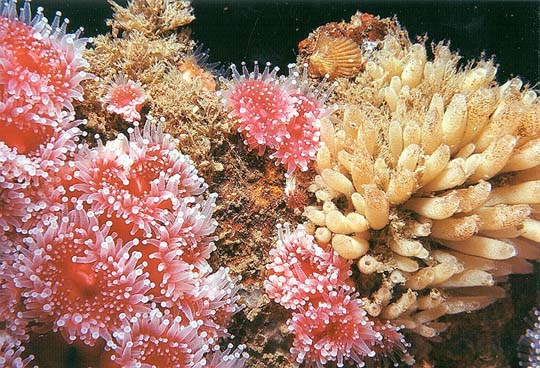
Strawberry Anemones on Ruby E

The wreck is in good condition.

== The El Rey ==
The El Rey was a Kelco kelp cutter vessel that harvested the top three feet of the kelp canopy from Point Conception to Mexico. It was capable of carrying 300 tons of kelp. As a kelp cutter, it had a very unusual appearance.

In her 35-year career, she made some 3600 voyages and traveled more than 800,000 miles. The vessel was retired in 1981 and destined for the scrap yard. Instead, the San Diego Council of Diving Instructors and The California Department of Fish and Game requested her for an artificial reef program. Kelco donated the retired ship. It was cleaned to prevent pollution and prepared to be diver safe. On April 2, 1987, the El Rey was towed to off of San Diego. A U.S. Navy Demolition Team used explosives to sink her. She came to rest upright on the bottom.

The wreck has deteriorated over the years. There are many fish living in the wreck.

== Naval Ocean Systems Center (NOSC) Tower ==
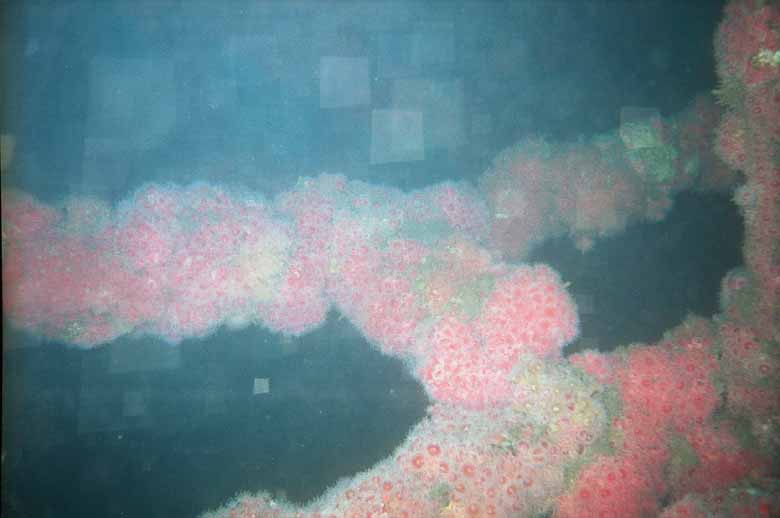
NOS Tower in Wreck Alley, San Diego, CA

The NOSC tower is an old Naval Ocean Systems Center (NOSC) tower dedicated to oceanic research that was built in 1959 about a half mile offshore. One day after a storm, it wasn't there anymore. Now it sits in sixty feet of water. It looks like an oil rig. It is now an amazing artificial reef covered in life, particularly thick growths of brilliantly colored Strawberry Anemones. There is some fish life as well. Because it was knocked down in a storm, it is the only true wreck in Wreck Alley.

The remains of the tower are covered in Corynactis anemone.

== Ingraham Street Bridges ==
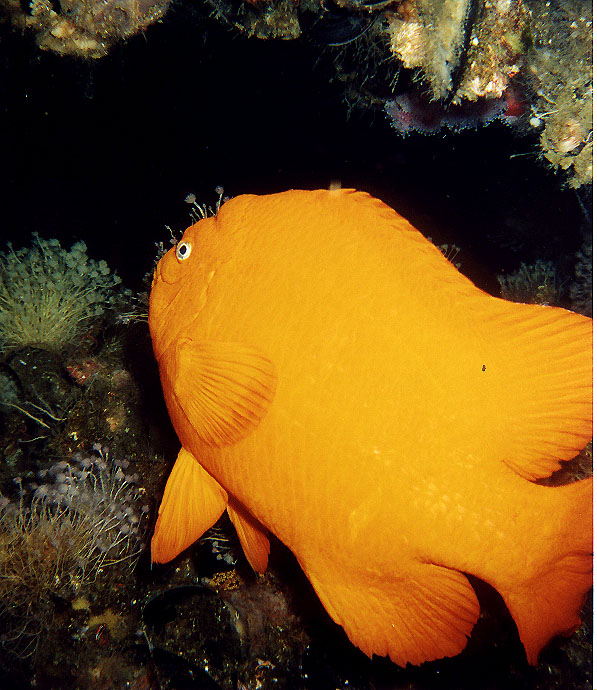
Garibaldi near Wreck Alley, San Diego, CA

The Ingraham Street Bridges spanned Mission Bay. When they were replaced in 1985 the old bridge pilings and roadway were dumped in the Wreck Alley area. These were huge pieces of bridge, roadway, railings and pillars, all jumbled together. There were many fish and various crawling sealife as well. There were also many clumps of strawberry-colored Corynactis anemones on the lower sections of the reef and on the top flat sections, pink and brown Gorgonian sea fans grow thick.

== The Sewer Pipe ==
A bit south of Wreck Alley, sticking west out of Point Loma, is The Sewer Pipe. It is covered in rocks so it is like a large underwater break wall that sticks up about 30 feet from the bottom. It extends about a mile from shore. It is covered in golden laminaria kelp and numerous gorgonian sea fans. As it has many holes, it is filled with life of all kinds.

== Wreck Alley in the British Virgin Islands ==
In the British Virgin Islands, there is another collection of intentionally sunk wrecks for scuba divers, also referred to as "wreck alley", a couple of hundred yards offshore from Cooper Island.
