= MT Hephaestus =

Bunkering oil tanker which ran aground off Qawra, Malta

Coordinates: 36.017459°N 14.288641°E

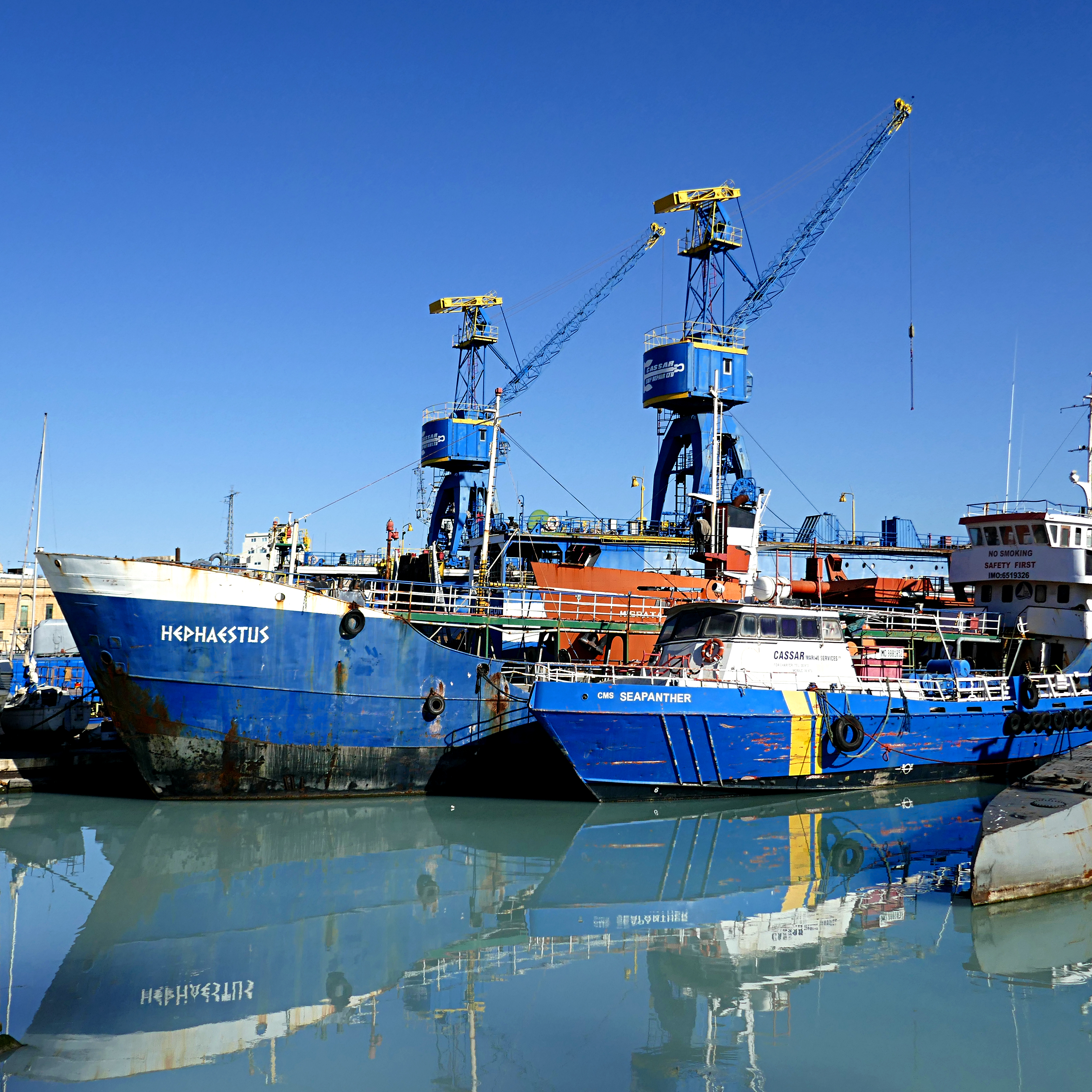
- Hephaestus laid up at Marsa in 2020

History

Togo
- Name: Hephaestus
- Namesake: Hephaestus
- Owner: Orbiter Navigation Corp.
- Operator: Volont Maritime S.A.
- Port of registry: Lomé, Togo
- Builder: Bröderna Jonssons Torrdocka (Kållansdsö Varv AB), Lidköping
- Completed: 1965
- Out of service: 10 February 2018
- Identification: IMO number: 6519326; MMSI number: 671943000; Call sign: 5VFD8
- Fate: Scuttled, 29 August 2022

General characteristics
- Type: Oil tanker
- Tonnage: 595 GRT
- Length: 61.33 m (201.2 ft)
- Beam: 7.93 m (26.0 ft)
- Depth: 4.02 m (13.2 ft)
- Installed power: 410 kW (550 hp)
- Propulsion: 1 x 6 cyl. diesel engine
- Speed: 11 kn (20 km/h; 13 mph)
- Crew: 7

MT or MV (Note: Official documents generally use the prefix "MT" or "M/T" (for Motor tanker) when referring to the Hephaestus, but the prefix "MV" (for Motor vessel) is sometimes also used.) Hephaestus was a bunkering oil tanker that ran aground off Qawra, Malta on 10 February 2018 and was subsequently scuttled as a dive site off Xatt l-Aħmar, Gozo on 29 August 2022.

== Description ==
MV Hephaestus was a steel-built tanker with a tonnage of 595 GRT. It was 61.33 m (201.2 ft) long, with a beam of 7.93 m (26.0 ft). It had one 6 cylinder Ruston Stafford 6 CSRKM 4 Stroke diesel engine with a single shaft and one screw. The vessel's power was 410 kW (550 hp) and it had a speed of 11 kn (20 km/h; 13 mph).

== Career ==
The vessel was built in 1965 by Bröderna Jonssons Torrdocka (Kållansdsö Varv AB) in Lidköping, Sweden. By 2018, it was owned by the Orbiter Navigation Corp. and managed by Volont Maritime S.A. It was registered in Lomé, Togo.

=== 2018 grounding ===
At the time of the 2018 grounding, the Hephaestus was commanded by Bangladeshi captain Joynal Abedin. The other crew members were from Bangladesh, Russia and Egypt. The vessel had been at sea for about four months, and from January 2018 it had been anchored at Is-Sikka l-Bajda off Qawra, Malta while there was a dispute relating to payment of crew's wages.

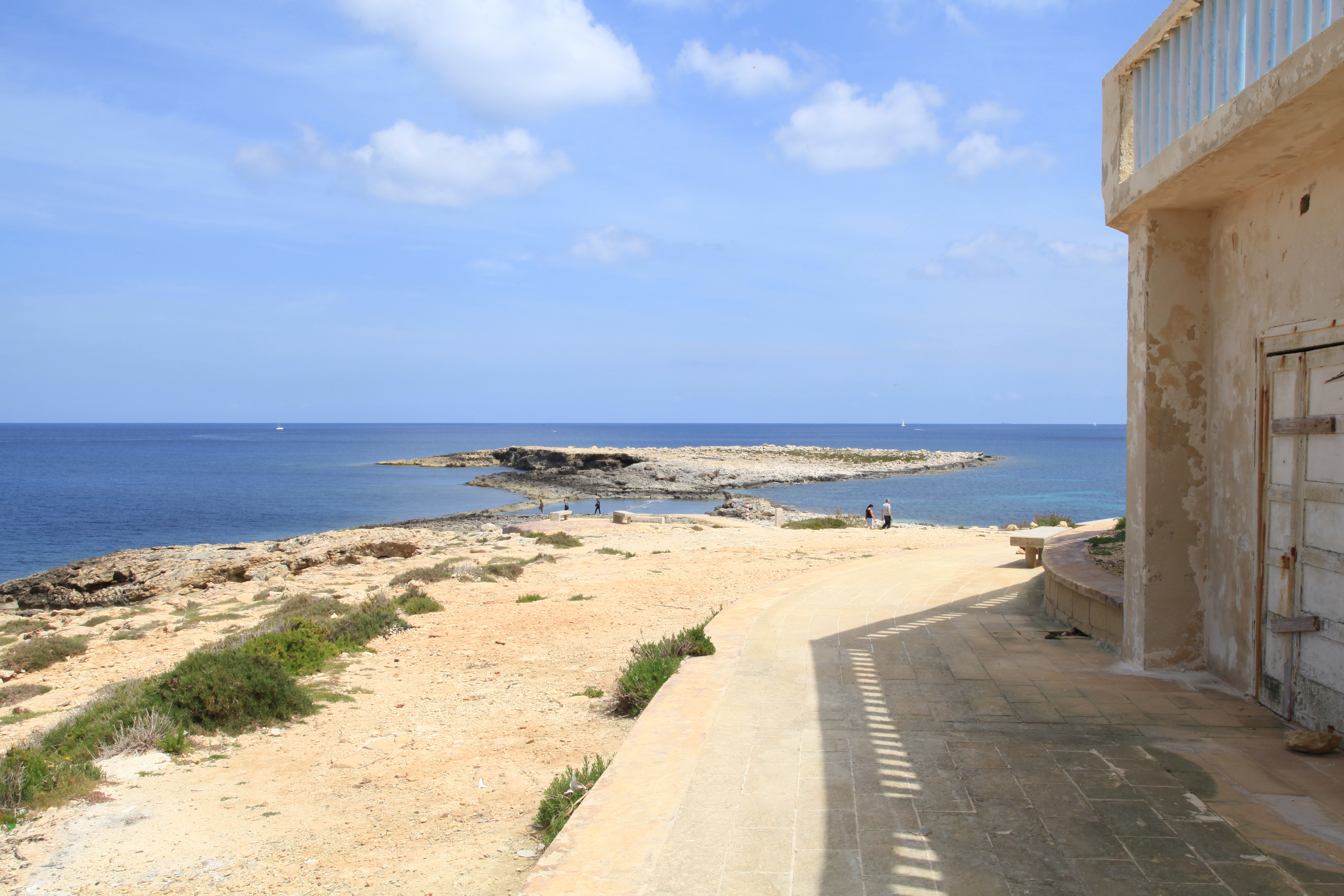
Qawra Point, near which the vessel was grounded in February 2018

On the morning of 10 February 2018, the vessel was caught in a severe storm with rough seas. At about 05.30, Abedin attempted to sail the vessel into a sheltered area, but the crew lost control within minutes and the vessel was beached on a rocky coastline in an area known as Fra Ben, close to the Qawra Tower. After informing authorities of the accident, all seven crew members disembarked the vessel using a rope ladder, and Abedin was treated for a minor shoulder injury at Mater Dei Hospital.

The vessel was not carrying any cargo at the time of its grounding. A minor diesel leak was reported on 17 February, but authorities reported that the wreck's risk of pollution was low. The Marine Safety Investigation Unit of Transport Malta launched an investigation into the accident and published its findings in a report. The ship's crew were accommodated at the Seafarers' Centre in Floriana before leaving Malta on 27 February.

In the months after the grounding, the Hephaestus shipwreck became a popular photo backdrop for Maltese and foreign social media users. Recovery operations were carried out by Cassar Ship Repair Ltd., which plugged in holes within the ship's hull before pulling it out to sea using tugboats and hydraulic jacks on 15 August 2018. It was successfully towed to Cassar's facility in Marsa, but the vessel's owners deemed that repairing the damage would be too costly.

=== 2022 scuttling ===
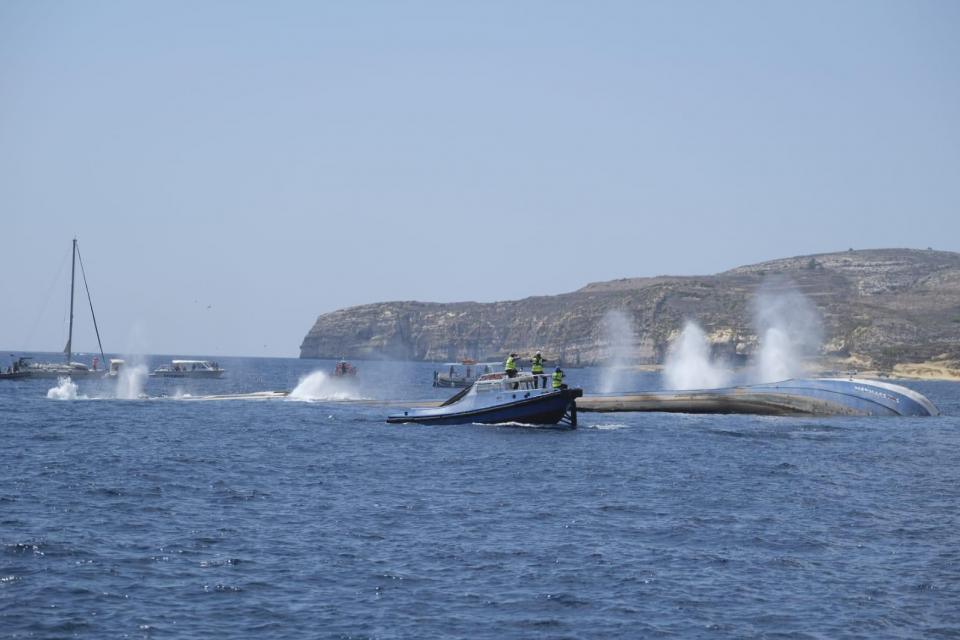
Scuttling.

By 2019, the Professional Diving Schools Association of Malta, Gozo and Comino (PDSA) made plans to scuttle the Hephaestus off Qala, Gozo as a diving attraction. Prior to scuttling, some of the vessel's equipment was removed and efforts were made to clean it of pollutants.

The vessel was scuttled off Xatt l-Aħmar in Gozo on 29 August 2022, with the operation being carried out by the Malta Tourism Authority, the PDSA and the Ministry for Gozo.

== Wreck ==
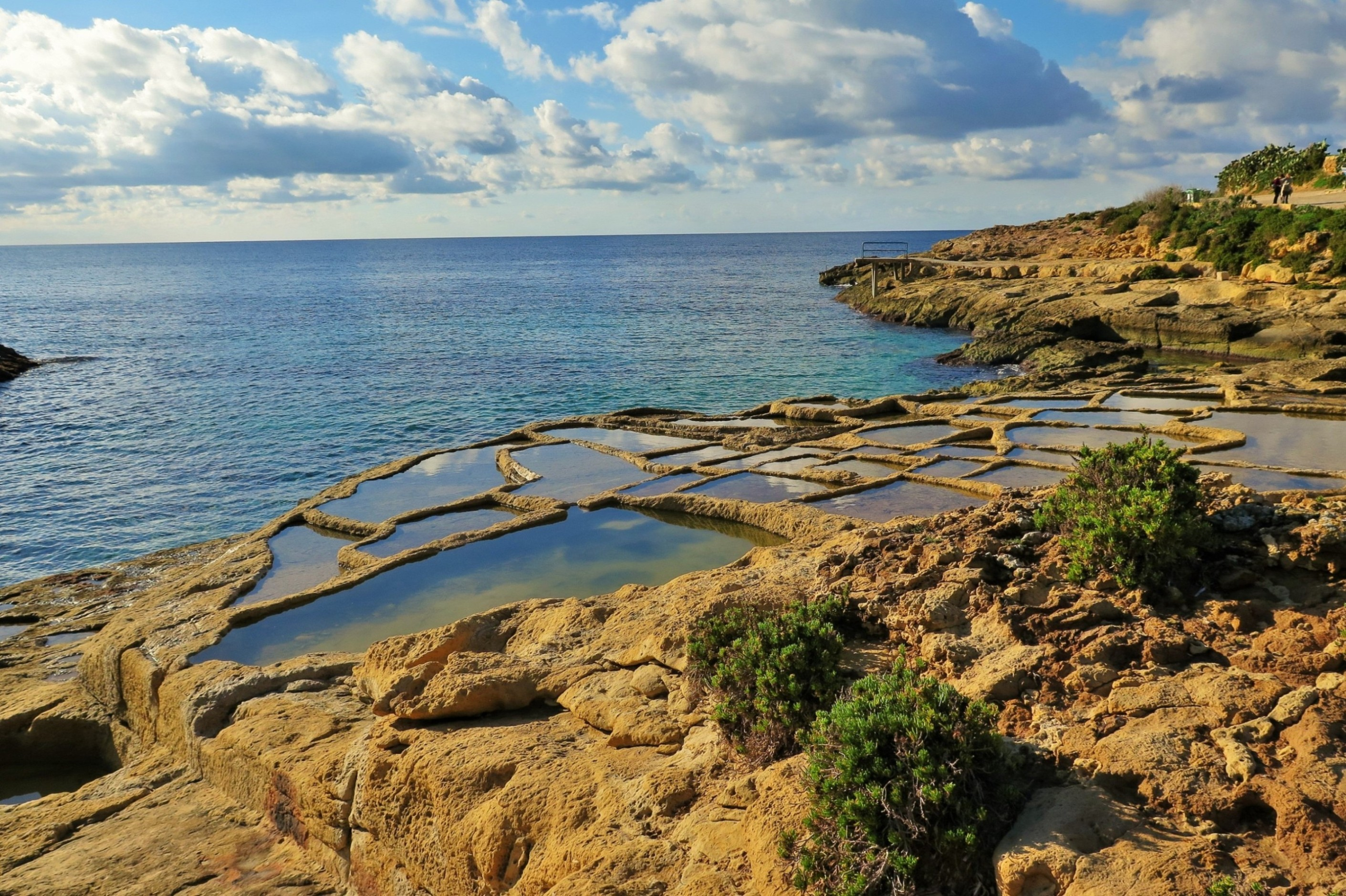
Xatt l-Aħmar

The wreck is located approximately 30 m (98 ft) off the Xatt l-Aħmar coast, resting upright on a sandy seabed at a depth of about 46 m (151 ft). It is close to wrecks of the MV Karwela, MV Xlendi and MV Cominoland, which were previously also deliberately scuttled as diving attractions.
