= Lady Thetis =

Cypriot passenger ship sunk for use as a recreational dive site

Lady Thetis was a Cypriot passenger ship sunk for use as a recreational dive site in the Mediterranean Sea off Limassol, Cyprus.

She used to be named Reiher and was employed as a coastal passenger vessel. She was built in Hamburg, West Germany, in 1953 and was registered in the Register of Cyprus Ships in 1990.

Lady Thetis was sunk off Limassol in February 2014 along with the fishing vessel Constandis to serve as a recreational dive site. Lady Thetis lies in approximately 18 meters (59 feet) of water and has a number of easy swim-throughs and penetration options for divers who are more adventurous. Due to the way the wreck hit and has dug into the seafloor, a deeper depth than the seabed can be achieved inside the wreck close to the keel. A decompression trapeze can be found at the stern of the wreck at 5 meters (16 feet), 30 to 40 meters (98 to 131 ft) from the wreck buoy.

== Dive site ==
Access: Whilst close to the marina adjacent to the Crowne Plaza Hotel, a vessel is required to complete the transit to the site.

- Expected depth: 20 metres (66 feet)
- Bottom characteristics: Sandy/Silty
- Max depth in area: <30 metres (98 feet)
- Alternate site: Three stars/Paphos/Latchi

Particular risks:

- Traffic protection - High
- Narcosis - Low
- Decompression - Moderate
- Increased air consumption - High
- Limited time - Low
- Poor visibility - Moderate
- Separation - High
- Entanglement - Moderate
- Entrapment and sharps – High
- Dehydration/Sun burn/Exposure – High
- Penetration - Low
