= Cooper Island (British Virgin Islands) =

Island in the British Virgin Islands

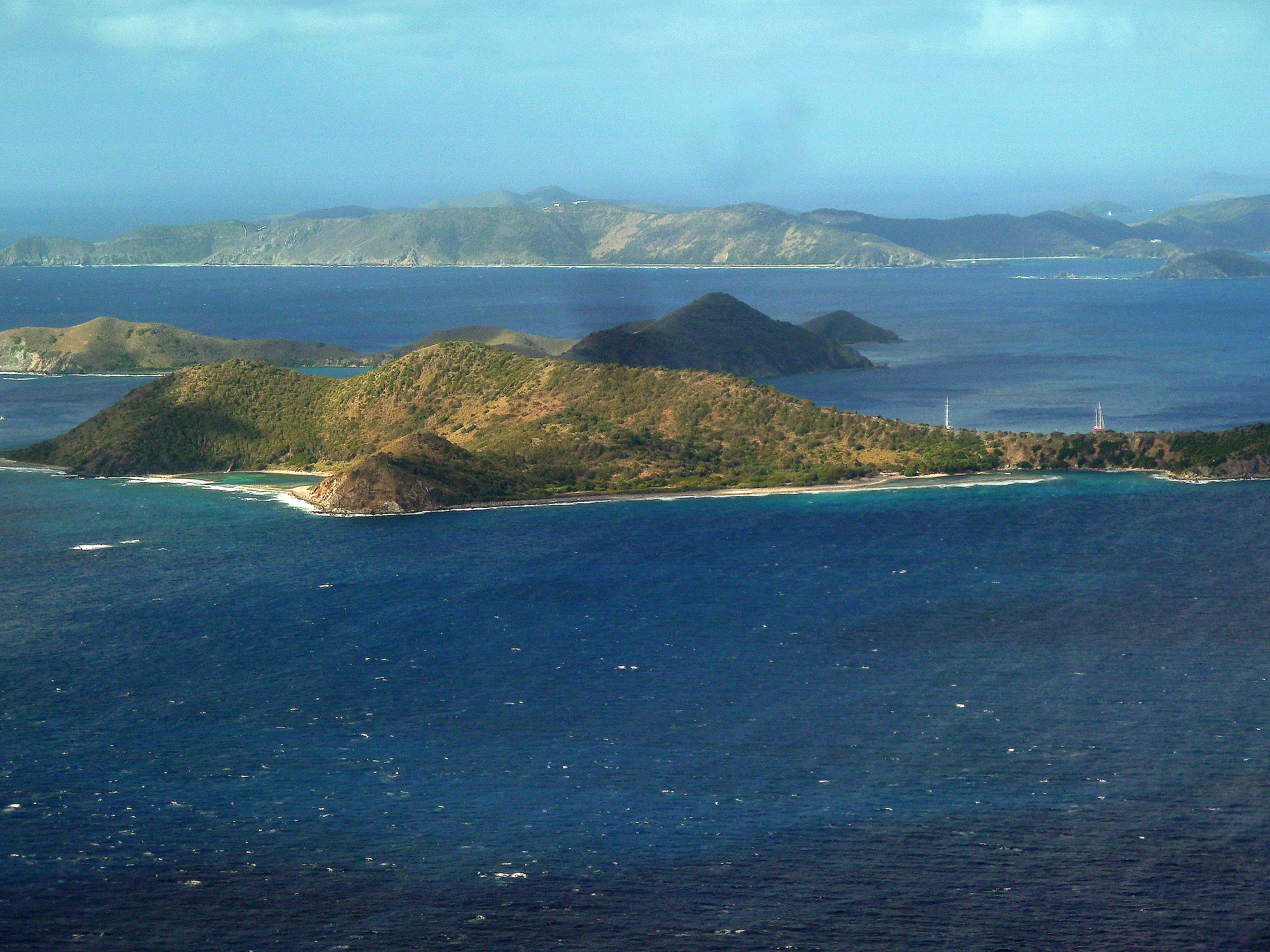
- Cooper Island with Peter Island in the background

- The location of Cooper Island within the British Virgin Islands

- Location within British Virgin Islands Location within the Caribbean

Geography
- Location: Caribbean Sea
- Coordinates: 18.3859°N 64.5118°W
- Archipelago: Virgin Islands

Administration
- United Kingdom; British Virgin Islands
- British Overseas Territory: British Virgin Islands

Demographics
- Population: 26 (2010)

Additional information
- Time zone: AST (UTC-4)
- ISO code: VG

Cooper Island is a small island of the British Virgin Islands in the Caribbean. It is one of the "Little Sisters" islands.

There are five privately owned properties on the island, plus a small beach club resort. Cooper Island Beach Club has 8 hotel rooms, a restaurant, rum bar, coffee shop, solar powered brewery, and gift shop. Facilities are open to guests, day visitors and yachts using the nearby moorings. Manchioneel Bay (/ˈmækəniːl/) features 30 mooring balls that accommodate vessels up to 60 feet.

Cooper Island is a popular stop for yachts, group tours visiting The Baths on Virgin Gorda, and day boat charters from Tortola, St. Thomas, and St. John.

The island lies adjacent to "wreck alley", a popular wreck diving site in the British Virgin Islands where a number of vessels have been deliberately sunk as dive sites. A local dive store near the beach club rents tanks to certified scuba divers.
