= Bergen Mekaniske Verksted =

Former ship wharf in Bergen, Norway

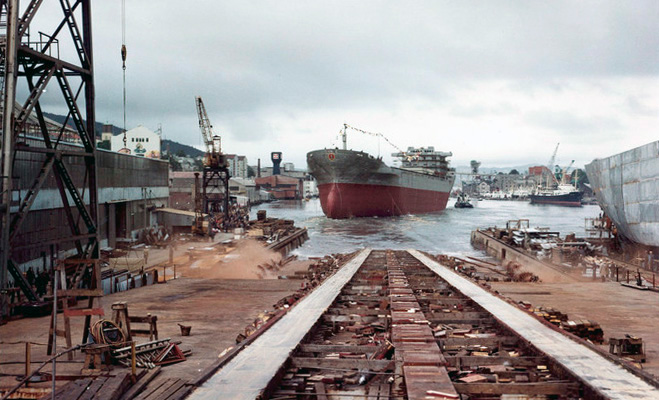
Launch of MS Taranger in 1969.

Bergen Mekaniske Verksted, later Bergens Mekaniske Verksteder, was a shipyard in Solheimsviken in Bergen, Norway. Established in 1855, it later also built a drydock in Laksevåg. The company folded in 1991, but the yard in Laksevåg is still in use.
