= Glen Strathallan =

British ship scuttled in Plymouth sound as a dive site

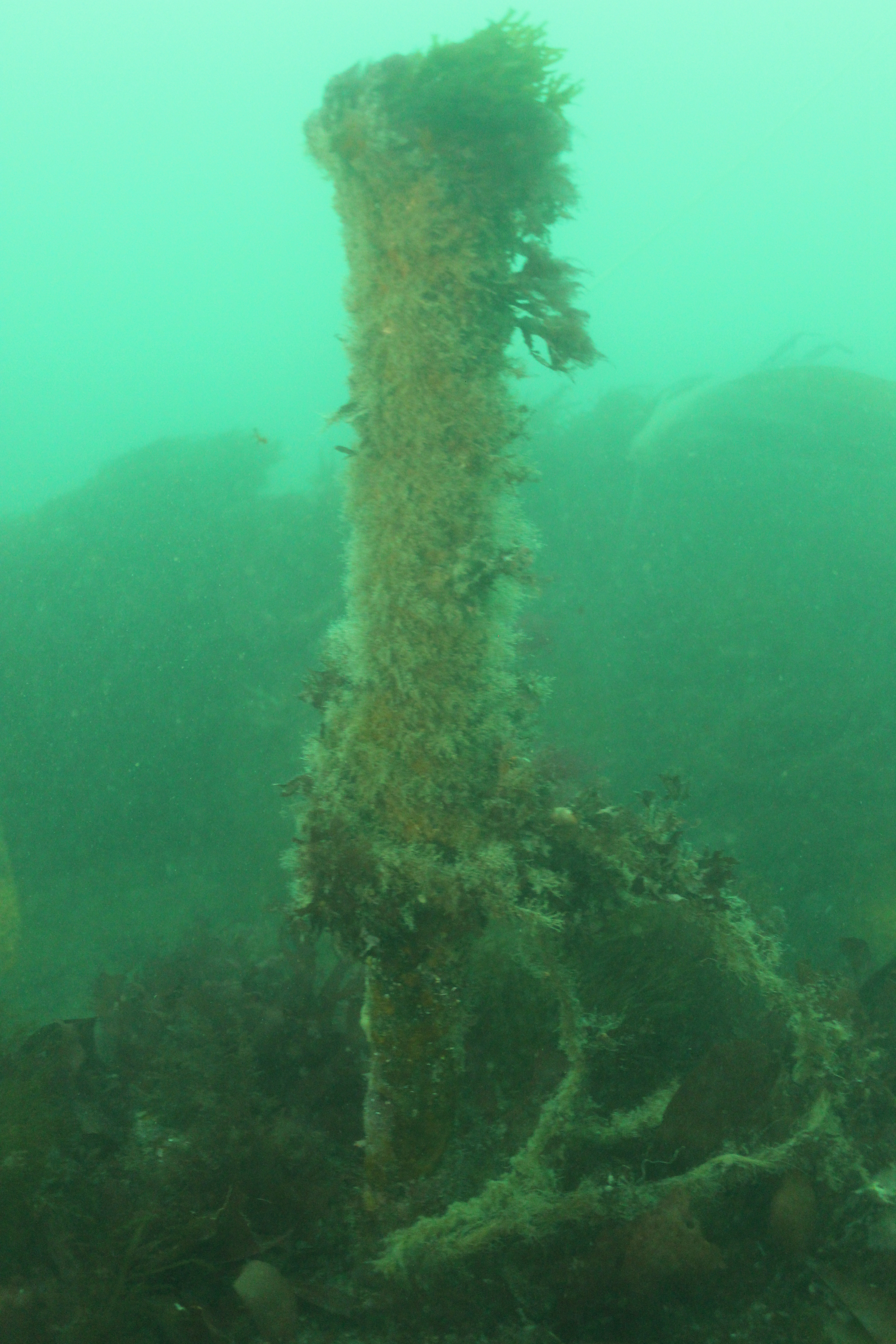
- Fragment of the wreckage of the Glen Strathallan, 2014

History

United Kingdom
- Name: Glen Strathallan
- Owner: R.A. Colby Cubbin (1928-1955); Merchant Navy (1955-1970)
- Port of registry: Douglas, Isle of Man
- Builder: Cochrane & Sons Ltd, Selby
- Yard number: 1020
- Launched: 25 May 1928
- Identification: Official number: 145305
- Fate: Scuttled off Plymouth, 27 April 1970

General characteristics
- Tonnage: 330 GRT; 119 NRT
- Length: 139 ft 2 in (42.42 m)
- Beam: 24 ft 1 in (7.34 m)
- Depth: 13 ft 2 in (4.01 m)
- Propulsion: 1 × 108 hp (81 kW) 3-cylinder triple expansion engine, by C.D. Holmes & Co., Hull
- Speed: 10 knots (19 km/h; 12 mph)
- Armament: 1 × 12-pounder gun (in RN service)

Glen Strathallan was a British ship originally built as a trawler, but then converted into a private yacht, which also served in the Royal Navy in World War II. She was finally scuttled in 1970 at Plymouth Sound, England as a diver training site.

== Ship history ==
The ship was built in 1928 by Cochrane & Sons of Selby, Yorkshire, as a steam fishing trawler and registered at Glasgow as F/V Glen Strathallan (GW.15). However, the company that ordered her went bankrupt before she was completed, so she was bought by Robert Alfred Colby Cubbin, who spent £30,000 converting her into a yacht under the same name, registered at Douglas, Isle of Man.

On the outbreak of World War II in September 1939, Glen Strathallan was requisitioned by the Royal Navy. As the Armed Yacht HMS Glen Strathallan (FY–010) she served as an anti-submarine vessel until late 1945.

Returned to Colby Cubbin, she was used for cruises between the Isle of Man and Scotland until his death in 1955. Under the terms of his will she then served as the training ship T/S Glen Strathallan at King Edward VII Nautical College, training future officers of the Merchant Navy until 1970.

The elderly ship had her main engine removed (it was acquired by the Science museum and was on display at the Science Museum in London from 1978 until 2004. It now resides in the museum's storage facility) and she was scuttled about 200 yards from the Shagstone on 27 April 1970. Intended to be used as a diver training site, she was sunk in shallow water, but soon found to be obstructing the entrance to the port and was dispersed using explosives. The remains currently sit in 15 metres (50 ft) of water south of the Plymouth breakwater at 50°18.922′N 4°7.529′W. The wreck is considerably broken up, but the boilers remain and are currently home to a number of conger eels.

== See also ==
- Sinking ships for wreck diving sites – Scuttling old ships to produce artificial reefs
- Recreational diving – Diving for the purpose of leisure and enjoyment
