= USS Indra =

Landing craft repair ship built for the United States Navy during World War II

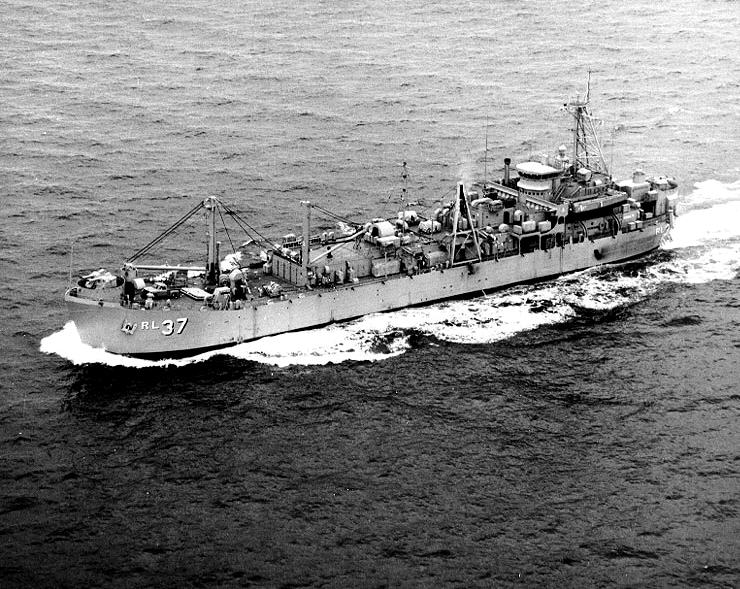
- USS Indra (ARL-37), underway c. 1960s

History

United States
- Name: LST-1147; Indra
- Namesake: Indra
- Builder: Chicago Bridge & Iron Company, Seneca, Illinois
- Laid down: 12 February 1945
- Sponsored by: Regina K. Hlubak
- Commissioned: 21 May 1945 (partial); 2 October 1945 (full)
- Decommissioned: 6 October 1947
- Renamed: Indra, 15 August 1944
- Reclassified: ARL-37
- Refit: converted to Landing Craft Repair Ship
- Identification: Hull symbol: LST-1147; Hull symbol: ARL-37; Code letters: NDPV
- Recommissioned: 16 December 1967
- Decommissioned: May 1970
- Stricken: 1984
- Honors and awards: 2 × battle stars, Vietnam War
- Fate: Sunk as an artificial reef, 4 August 1992; 34°33′55″N 76°58′30″W

General characteristics
- Class & type: LST-542-class tank landing ship; Achelous-class repair ship
- Displacement: 2,220 long tons (2,256 t) (light); 3,960 long tons (4,024 t) (full)
- Length: 328 ft (100 m) oa
- Beam: 50 ft (15 m)
- Draft: 11 ft 2 in (3.40 m)
- Installed power: 2 × 900 hp (670 kW) Electro-Motive Diesel 12-567A diesel engines; 1,800 shp (1,300 kW)
- Propulsion: 1 × Falk main reduction gears; 2 × Propellers
- Speed: 11.6 kn (21.5 km/h; 13.3 mph)
- Complement: 19 officers 270 enlisted
- Armament: 1 × 3 in (76 mm)/50 caliber gun; 2 × quad 40 mm (1.57 in) Bofors guns (Mark 51 director); 2 × twin 40 mm Bofors guns (Mark 51 director); 6 × twin 20 mm (0.79 in) Oerlikon cannons

USS Indra (ARL-37) was one of 39 Achelous-class landing craft repair ships built for the United States Navy during World War II. Named for Indra (the god of weather and war, and lord of Svargaloka in Hinduism), she was the only US Naval vessel to bear the name, and only one of three ships (along with USS Krishna and the Civil War era gunboat USS Varuna) to be named after a Hindu deity.

== Construction ==
Originally laid down as LST-1147 on 12 February 1945; reclassified while building and launched as ARL-37 by Chicago Bridge & Iron Company, of Seneca, Illinois, 21 May 1945; sponsored by Mrs. Regina K. Hlubek; placed in reduced commission and brought to Bethlehem Key Highway Shipyard, Baltimore, for conversion, and commissioned 2 October 1945.

== Service history ==
After shakedown, Indra sailed to Green Cove Springs, Florida, where she remained from 30 November 1945, until 8 May 1946. She then steamed through the Panama Canal to San Diego, arriving 4 June 1946. The ship remained in California until departing 7 January 1947, for the Far East. Indra arrived at Qingdao, 19 February 1947, to support the United States Marines there attempting to stabilize the volatile Chinese situation and protect American lives and property. She performed repair and general services there and at Shanghai, until 30 August 1947, when she sailed for San Diego. Upon her arrival on 25 September 1947, Indra was decommissioned on 6 October 1947, and entered the Pacific Reserve Fleet, San Diego Group.

Indra was recommissioned 16 December 1967. During the Vietnam War, Indra participated in the following campaigns:

- Vietnamese Counteroffensive – Phase IV (2 to 16 April 1968)
- Vietnamese Counteroffensive – Phase V (21 September to 1 November 1968)

Decommissioned in May 1970, she was struck from the Naval Vessel Register in 1984. Transferred to the state of North Carolina in January 1992, she was sunk as an artificial reef off the coast of North Carolina on 4 August 1992.

== Awards ==
Indra earned two battle stars for service during the Vietnam War.

== Bibliography ==
- "LST-1147". Dictionary of American Naval Fighting Ships. Naval History and Heritage Command. This article incorporates text from this source, which is in the public domain.
- "Indra". Dictionary of American Naval Fighting Ships. Naval History and Heritage Command. This article incorporates text from this source, which is in the public domain.
- "USS Indra (ARL-37)". NavSource. 27 October 2017.
- Mobile Riverine Force Association (4 October 1999). "History of The USS Indra (ARL-37)". Archived from the original on 23 February 2015.
