= Stanegarth =

Steam tugboat scuttled as a dive feature at Stoney Cove

Coordinates: 52°32.510′N 1°16.360′W

History

United Kingdom
- Name: Stanegarth
- Builder: Lytham Shipbuilding & Engineering Co. Ltd.
- Launched: 1910
- Identification: UK official number 131276
- Fate: Scuttled 2000

General characteristics
- Type: Tugboat
- Tonnage: 45grt
- Length: 18 m (59 ft)
- Beam: 5 m (16 ft)
- Installed power: Steam (1910–1957); Diesel (1957–2000)

Stanegarth was built in 1910 as a steam-powered tugboat by Lytham Ship Builders Company for service with Rea Towing Co., Liverpool. She was purchased by the Sharpness New Docks and Gloucester and Birmingham Navigation Company on 12 April 1933 for £1200 and moved to Gloucester.

During December 1944 she was used with the tug Resolute to assist the cargo vessel S.S. Tynemouth which had run into trouble in fog off Sharpness. The Company was awarded £622.4.3 in salvage award as a result. In 1948 the British Transport Commission Docks & Inland Waterways Executive took over the Dock Company and made efforts to modernise the tug fleet; Stanegarth was converted to diesel power in 1957. She passed into British Waterways ownership in 1963 along with the rest of the Gloucester tugs.

The tug used to tow three dredging hoppers, each crewed by two men, on the trip to and from Gloucester to Purton.

During May 1988, Stanegarth was provided as assistance to Mayflower when she returned to Gloucester for the first time after restoration.

On 6 June 2000 she was scuttled at Stoney Cove to produce an artificial reef suitable for wreck diving. The wreck now sits in 20 metres (66 ft) of fresh water and measures more than 18 metres (59 ft) long with a beam of 5 metres (16 ft). A plaque attached to it reads "Stanegarth project by Stoney Cove and Diver Magazine June 2008".

== See also ==
- Sinking ships for wreck diving sites – Scuttling old ships to produce artificial reefs
