= Stoney Cove =

Flooded quarry in Leicestershire used for scuba diving

Coordinates: 52°32′32″N 1°16′27″W

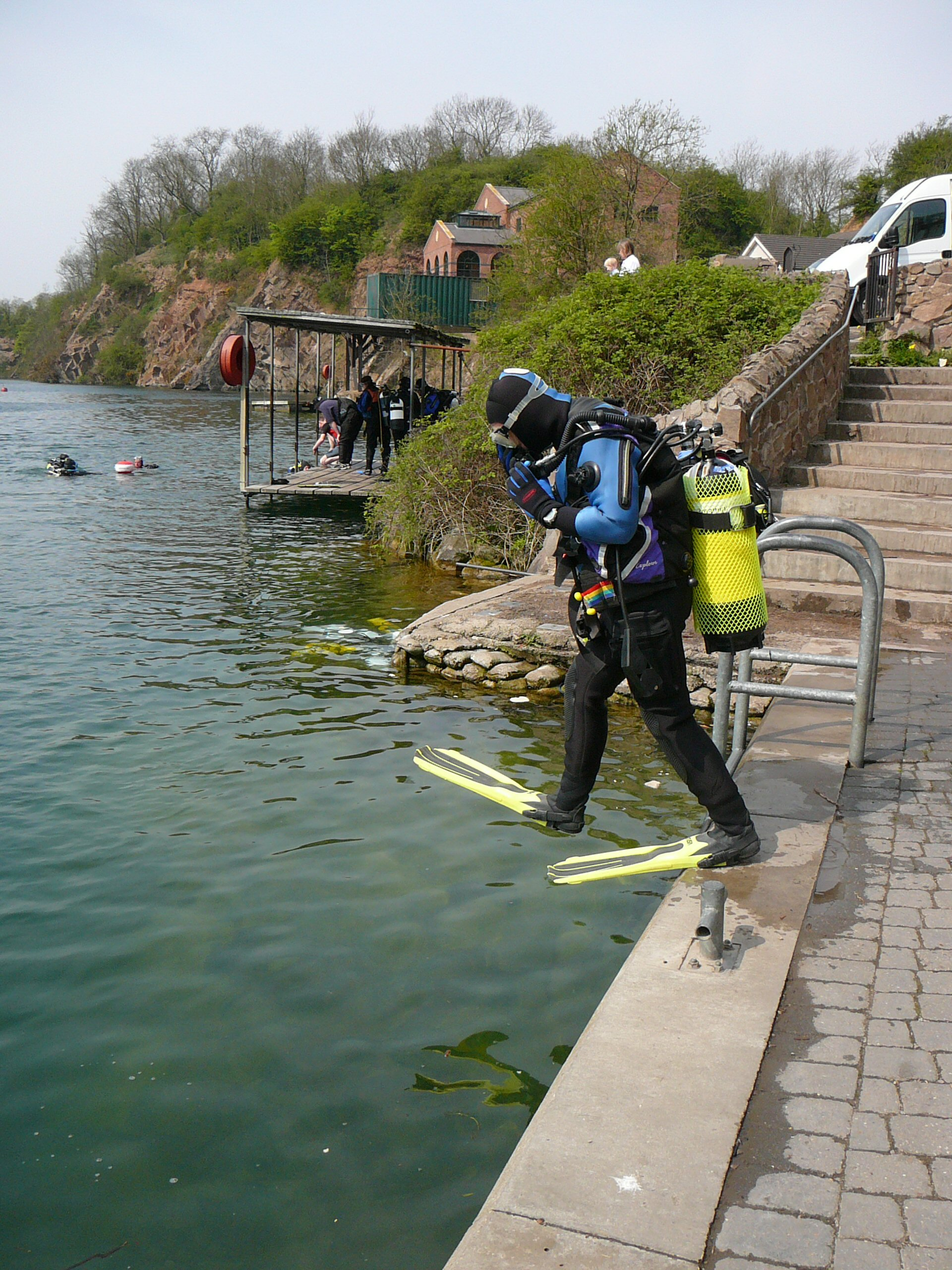
Diving at Stoney Cove

Stoney Cove is a large flooded quarry which is a popular inland scuba diving site, located between Stoney Stanton and Sapcote in Leicestershire, England.

== Background ==
Stoney Cove was originally a granite quarry dating back to the beginning of the 19th century. In 1850 a train line was added to move the granite more easily from the Top Pit to the centre of Stoney Stanton. Although the quarry had always struggled with an influx of spring water, this proved to be a blessing when quarrying ceased in 1958, as the water gradually filled the site over the next few years. By 1963, diving pioneers were using the quarry to practise their hobby. Over the next fifteen years, Stoney Cove was used to train North Sea oil divers and in 1978 Stoney Cove Marine Trials Ltd was formed to fully exploit the site on a commercial basis.

== Scuba facilities ==
Stoney Cove is used for scuba diving training as well as pleasure dives and open water swimming. On shore facilities include a dive shop, diving school, cylinder filling station and a public house. The site has a range of depths to 36 metres (118 ft), whilst the underwater attractions include:

- Stanegarth, claimed to be the largest inland wreck in the UK
- Vickers Viscount aircraft cockpit, small aircraft wreck a Wessex helicopter
- Nautilus submarine, galleon, wooden boat and a bus
- Archways beneath the pub
- Deep hydrobox
- Submerged trees
- Tower
- Blow-off preventer
- 4-metre block house
- APC

== See also ==
- Princes Channel Wreck
