= USS Varuna =

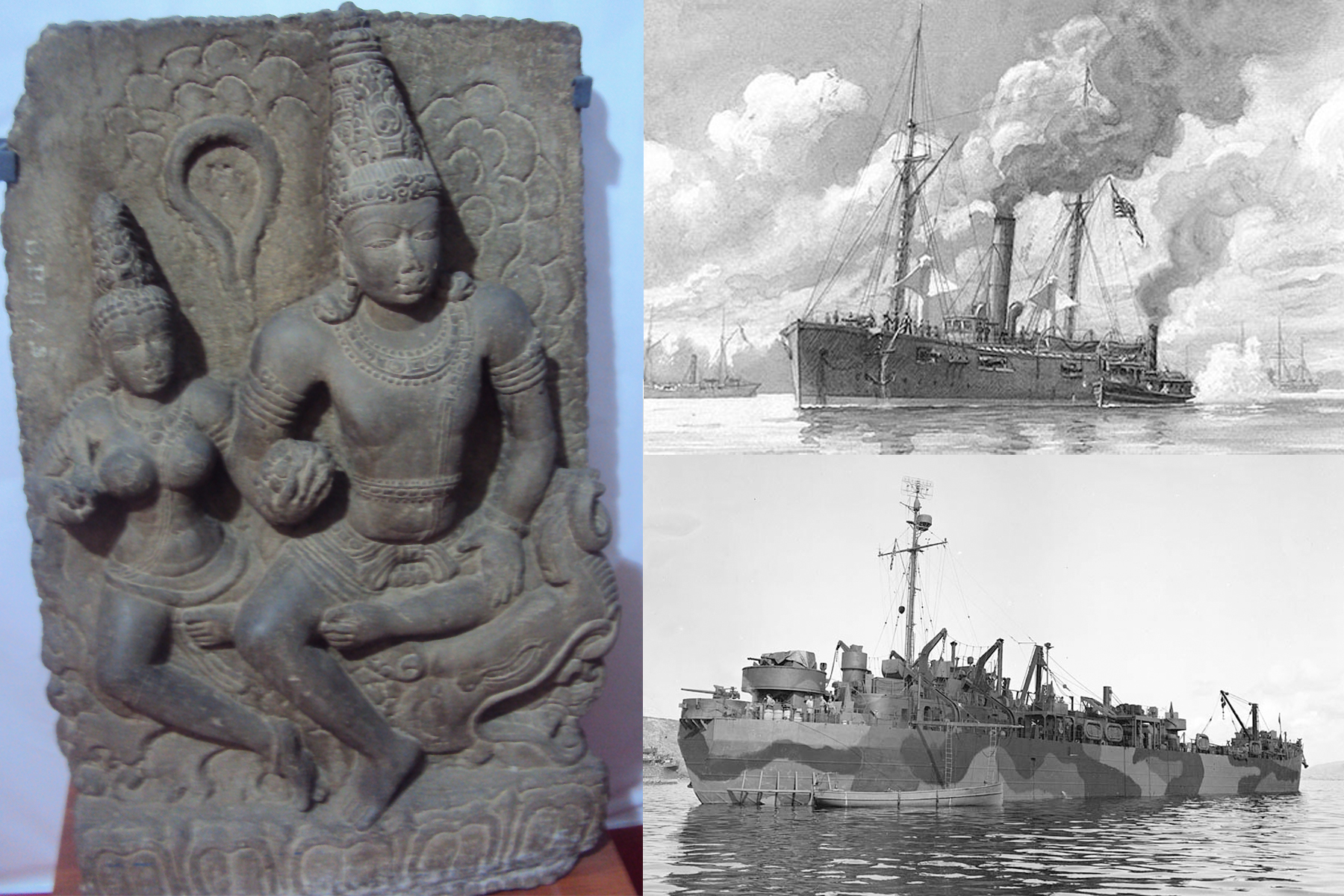
Varuna, the Indian Neptune, USS Varuna (1861) and USS Varuna (1943)

Two ships in the United States Navy have been named USS Varuna for Varuna, the Vedic god of oceans and rivers and keeper of the souls of the drowned.

- The first USS Varuna (1861) was a screw gunboat launched in 1861 and sunk by enemy action in April 1862.
- The second USS Varuna (AGP-5) was a motorboat tender, commissioned in 1943 and decommissioned in 1946.

== See also ==
- SS Varuna, a 670 GRT American passenger/cargo steamer built in 1869 by Chas Mallory at Mystic, Connecticut for the Mallory Line that sank in 1870.
