= Um El Faroud =

Libyan owned tanker scuttled as dive site off Malta

Coordinates: 35.82209°N 14.44959°E

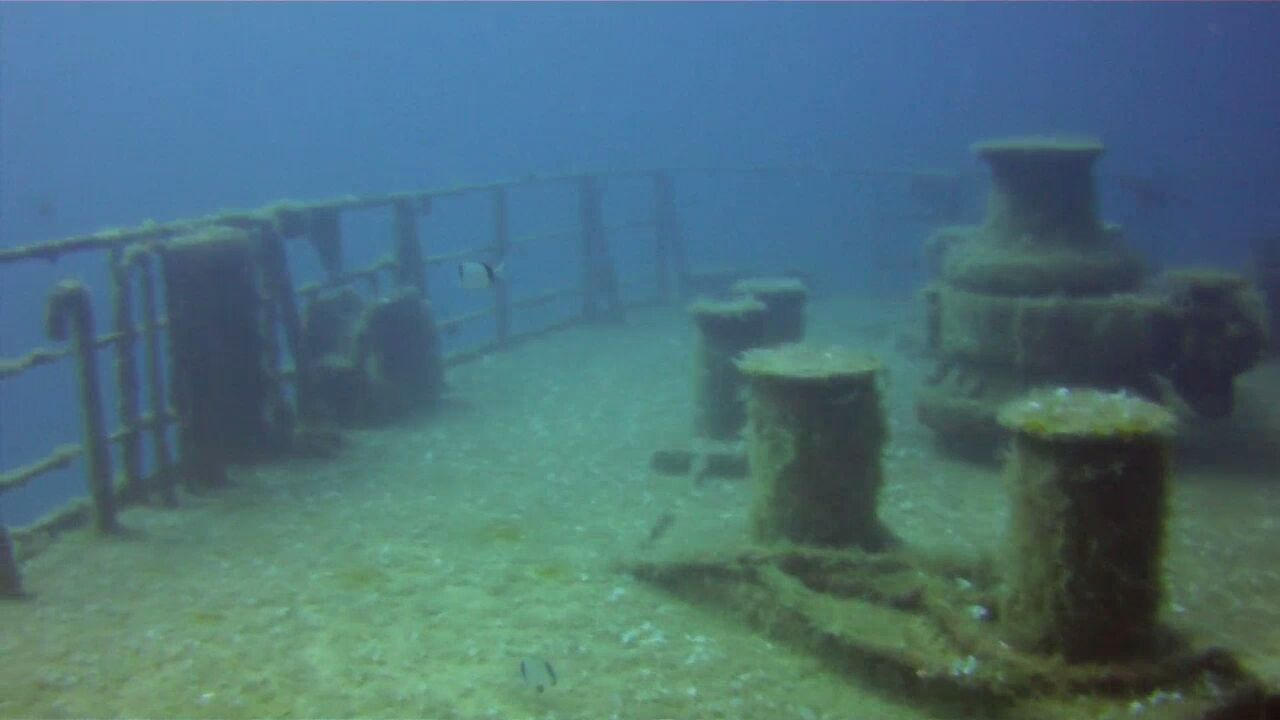
- Wreck of Um El Faroud

History

Libya
- Owner: General National Maritime Transport Company
- Builder: Smiths Dock Company
- Launched: 31 May 1969
- Identification: IMO number: 6918613
- Fate: scuttled as an artificial reef

General characteristics
- Type: Motor tanker
- Tonnage: 3,148 GRT; 5,390 DWT
- Length: 115 m (377 ft)
- Beam: 15.5 m (51 ft)

Um El Faroud was a 5,390 DWT Libyan-owned single screw motor tanker. Following a gas explosion during maintenance work on 3 February 1995, she was scuttled off the coast of Malta as an artificial reef and diving attraction.

The name Um El Faroud means Mother of Abbundance

== History ==
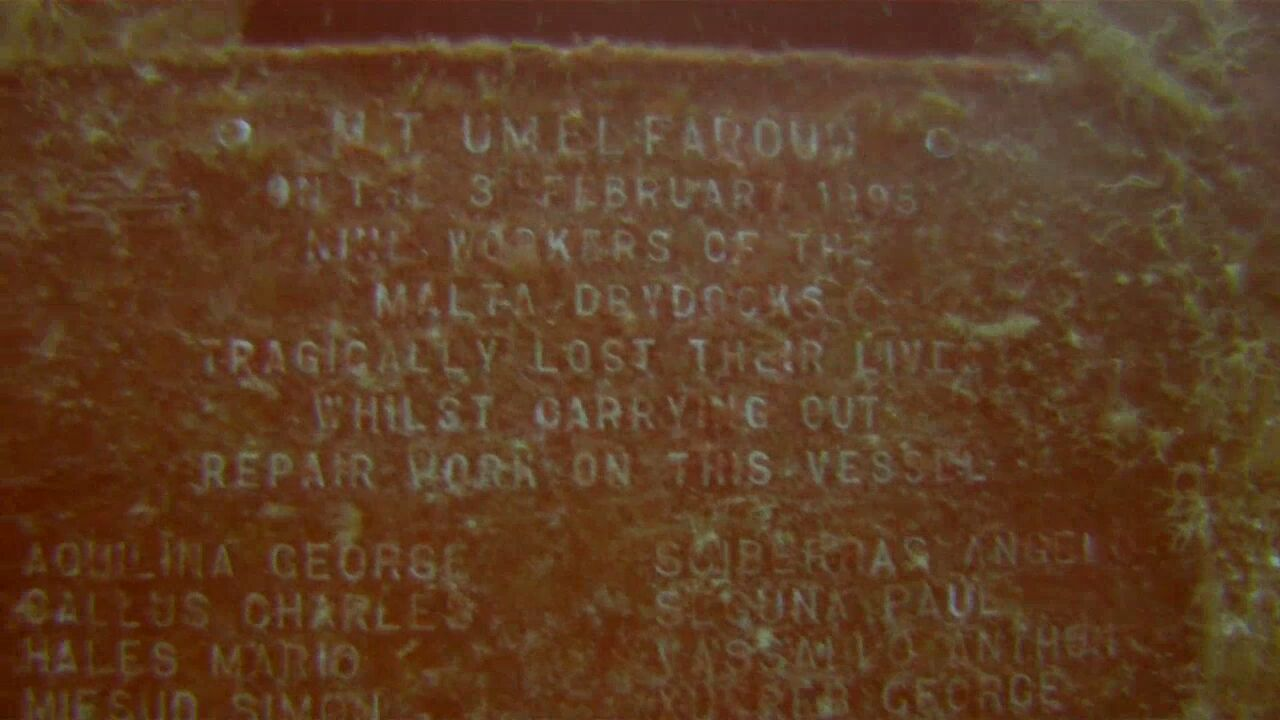
Plaque on the shipwreck commemorating the explosion

The ship was built in 1969 at Smith Dock Co. Ltd, Middlesbrough, England and was owned by the General National Maritime Transport Company, Tripoli (GNMTC). She was assessed at 3,148 GRT and 5,390 DWT. She had been operating between Italy and Libya carrying refined fuel up to 1 February 1995. On 3 February 1995 she was docked at No.3 Dock of Malta dry docks. During the night of 3 February an explosion occurred in No.3 centre tank, killing nine shipyard workers. The vessel suffered structural deformation and, following inspection and survey, was considered a total write-off. She occupied the dock in the harbor of Valletta for three years until 1998, when it was decided that the best option to utilize her remaining value was to tow her to sea and scuttle her as an artificial reef.

== Diving ==
The wreck sits upright on the sandy seabed southwest of Wied iż-Żurrieq. Um El Faroud is 115 metres (377 ft) long. The vessel has a beam of 15.5 metres (51 ft), and a height from keel to funnel top of approximately 22 metres (72 ft). The depth to the top of the bridge is 18 metres (59 ft) and 25 metres (82 ft) to the main deck. The bottom rests at 36 metres. After a bad storm during the winter of 2005/6 the ship has now broken in two.

Wreck penetration is possible with access to both the engine room and several of the smaller surrounding rooms in the stern section and parts of the mid and forward storage sections of the ship.

While the wreck is still relatively new, it has quickly become popular with fish, including pelagic species such as tuna, jacks, and barracuda. Scuba divers might come across some squid and barracudas at the stern.
