= Eagle (freighter) =

Freighter sunk as an artificial reef in Florida

Coordinates: 24°52′11″N 80°34′13″W

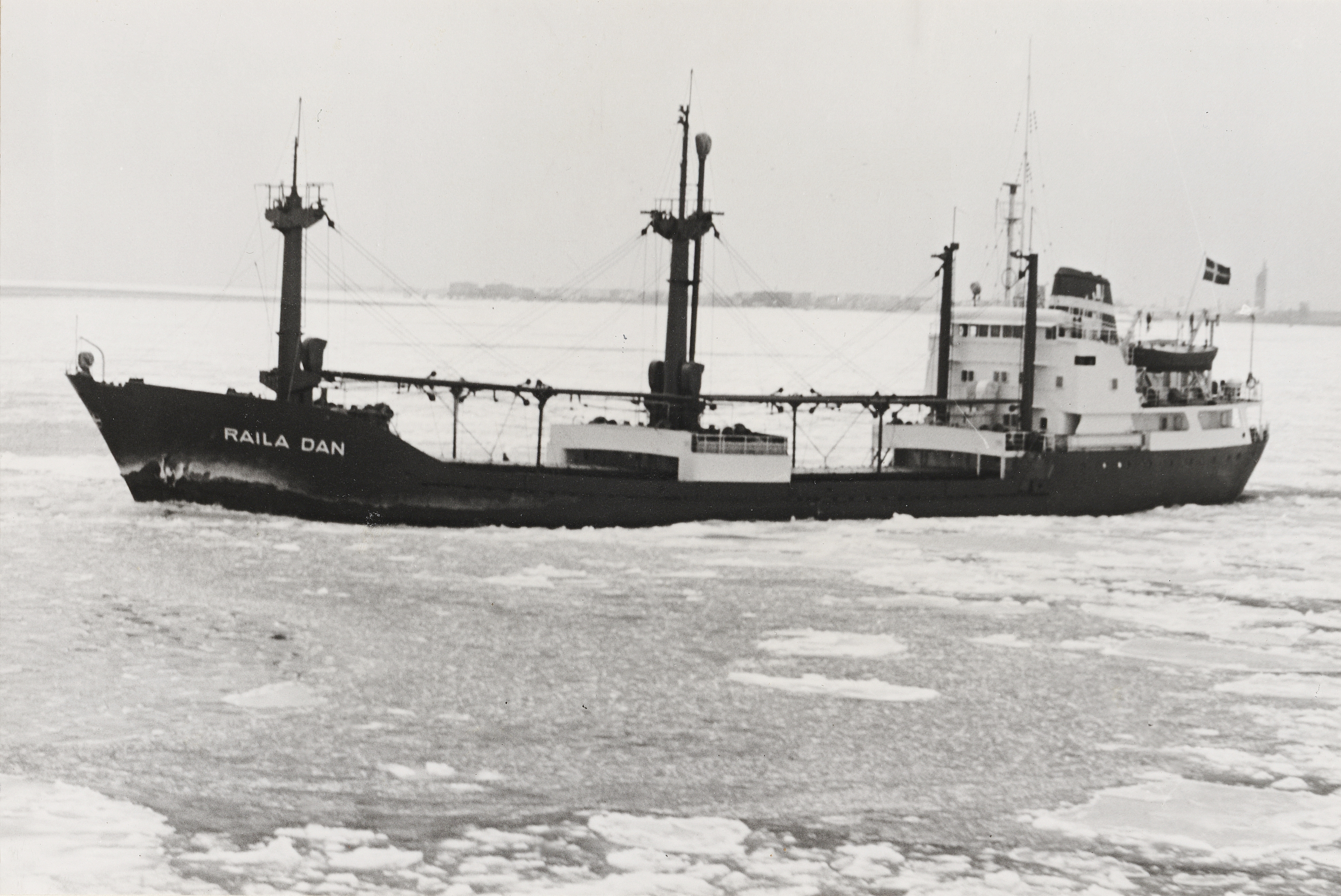
- Raila Dan in 1963

History
- Name: Raila Dan (1962–67); Barok (1967–74); Carmela (1974–76); Ytai (1976–77); Etai (1977–81); Carigulf Pioneer (1981–84); Arron K. (1984–85); Eagle Tire Co. (1985)
- Builder: Bijker's Aannemingsbedrijf N.V. IJsselwerf, Gorinchem, Netherlands
- Yard number: 167
- Launched: 7 July 1962
- Identification: IMO number: 5289340
- Fate: Badly damaged by fire, 6 October 1985; Sunk as an artificial reef, 19 December 1985

General characteristics
- Type: Cargo ship
- Length: 268 ft 6 in (81.84 m)
- Beam: 40 ft 4 in (12.29 m)
- Depth: 65 ft (20 m)
- Propulsion: 1 × 10-cylinder diesel engine, 1,700 shp (1,268 kW)
- Speed: 12.5 knots (23.2 km/h; 14.4 mph)

Eagle Tire Co. was a freighter that was sunk intentionally near Lower Matecumbe Key, Florida, to become an artificial reef and diving spot.

== Ship history ==
The ship was built in 1962 for Danish shipowners J. Lauritzen A/S at Bijkers Shipyard, Gorinchem, Netherlands, and named Raila Dan. In 1969, she was sold to the Dutch shipping company Poseidon and renamed Barok. In 1974, she was sold again, and renamed Carmela. She was then sold and renamed Ytai in 1976, and yet again sold, and renamed Etai the following year. In 1981, she was sold and renamed Carigulf Pioneer, and sold for the final time in 1984 and renamed Arron K. On 6 October 1985, the Arron K. caught fire while sailing from Miami to Venezuela, and was damaged beyond economical repair. On 19 December 1985, the ship was bought and prepared by the Florida Keys Artificial Reef Association, renamed Eagle Tire Co. for the Miami company owned by the businessman who donated $20,000 to the project, and sunk as an artificial reef near Lower Matecumbe Key, Florida. By 2014, the ship's final name had already been largely forgotten, referred to as simply the Eagle Tire or just the Eagle.

== Wreck ==
Eagle Tire Co. lies approximately three miles north-east of the Alligator Reef Light, six miles off the coast of the Lower Matecumbe Key, in between 70–115 feet (21–35 m) of water. On 2 September 1998, the wreck was disturbed by Hurricane Georges and split into two separate pieces, 100 feet (30 m) apart.
