= Peter L. Harrison =

Australian professor

Peter L. Harrison is an Australian marine biologist, ecologist, and a Professor at Southern Cross University, Australia, as well as the founding director of the Marine Ecology Research Centre. His specialty is coral reproduction ecology and larval restoration.

== Coral spawning research ==
In 1981, while conducting his PhD at James Cook University in Townsville, Harrison and a small group of other researchers discovered Mass Coral Spawning through intensive monitoring and diving around Magnetic Island. In 1984, Harrison and the team published their first paper on the occurrence, which had not previously been documented. One of his primary research focuses on coral and reef restoration and development of larger-scale coral larval restoration projects. This work aims to use millions of coral larvae to restore damaged reefs in the Philippines and on the Great Barrier Reef.

== Recognition ==
Harrison and the team were awarded the Eureka Prize for Environmental Research in 1992 for their discovery of mass coral spawning on the Great Barrier Reef. Harrison led a United Nations funded mission to assess the impacts of the first Gulf War on the coral reefs of Kuwait, and has a new coral species discovered in the Arabian Gulf named after him (Porites Harrisoni). Peter was appointed to the Australian Government’s Threatened Species Scientific Committee, on which he served from 2005 to 2015. A sculpture of Peter Harrison was created by Jason deCaires Taylor for the Museum of Underwater Art as part of the Ocean Sentinels above the surface exhibition in 2022 for his contributions.

== Teaching ==
Peter Harrison is the unit assessor for the Coral Reefs on the Edge teaching unit, which is the capstone unit for Marine Science and Management degree. This unit is an intensive delivery teaching unit that is based at Heron Island on the Southern Great Barrier Reef each year, with lectures and hands-on training directly on the reef.

== Publications ==
Harrison has published over 200 scientific research papers, reports and books. His work has been cited over 16,000 times.
