= Molinere Underwater Sculpture Park =

Collection of underwater contemporary art off Grenada in the Caribbean

Coordinates: 12.0834302°N 61.7655757°W

The Molinere Bay Underwater Sculpture Park is a collection of ecological underwater contemporary art located in the Caribbean sea off the west coast of Grenada, West Indies and was created by British sculptor Jason deCaires Taylor. In May 2006 the world's first underwater sculpture park was opened for public viewing. Taylor's aim was to engage local people with the underwater environment that surrounds them using his works which are derived from life casts of the local community. He installed concrete figures onto the ocean floor, mostly consisting of a range of human forms, from solitary individuals to a ring of children holding hands, facing into the oceanic currents.

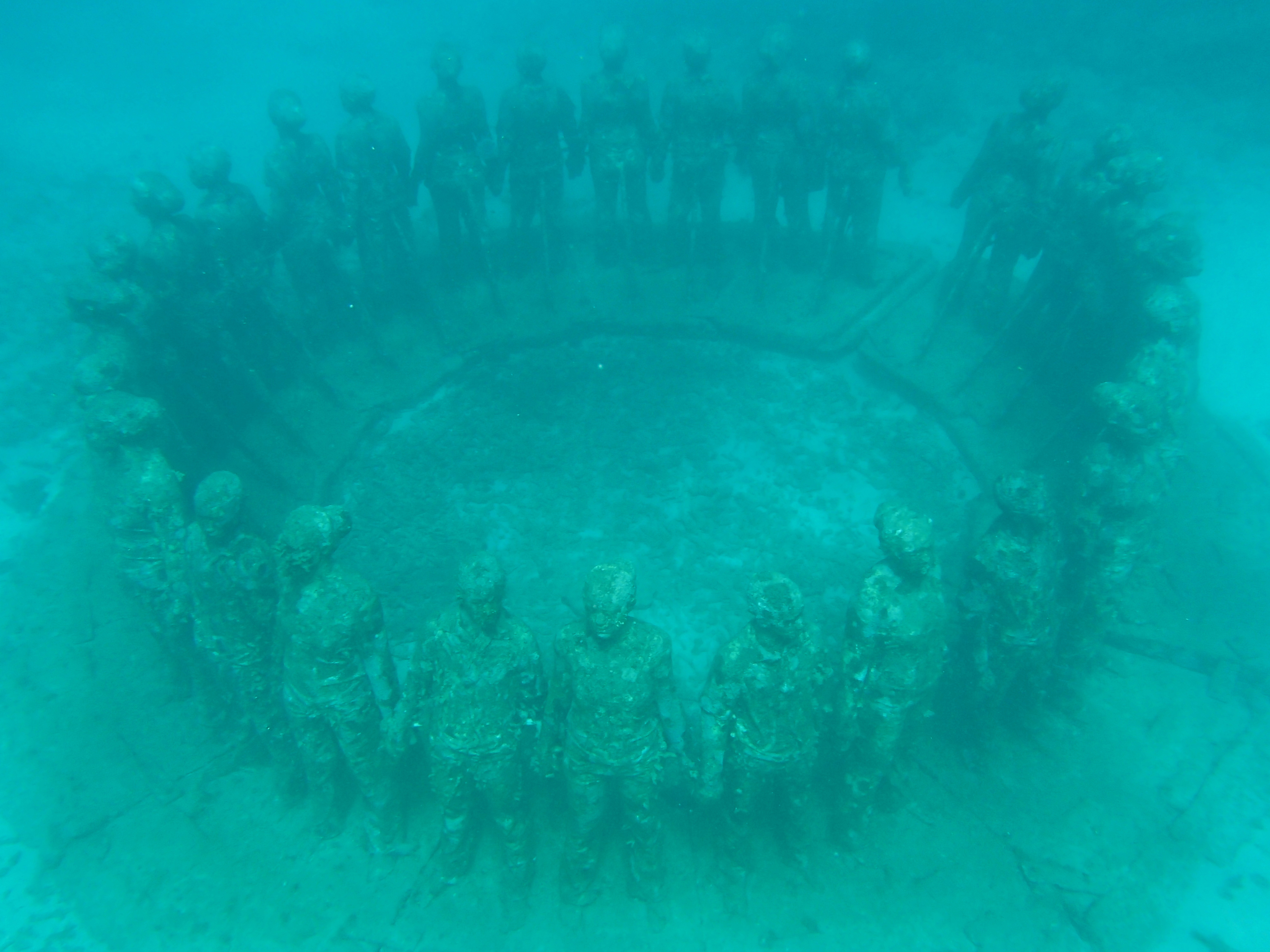
Underwater sculptures at Molinere Underwater Sculpture Park

== Background ==
The sculpture park, which began construction in 2006, is situated on the sandy ocean floor in the barren Molinere Bay. The sculpture park now helps relieve tourist pressure on natural reefs. The sculptures in the park have become popular among water sports enthusiasts, particularly in nearby Flamingo Bay, which is the most visited snorkeling destination on the island. In the park, over sixty-five concrete individual sculptures cover an area of over 800 square meters and in total weigh around 15 tonnes in dry cement.

The sculpture park is accessible via boat from the main port of St Georges (2 miles/3 km North of the capital) or Grand Anse Bay on the West coastline. The sculptures are situated in a variety of depths of water with a maximum of 12 meters, and the park is visited daily by scuba divers, snorkelers and glass bottom boats. In 2010, a local artist on the island added new works to the sculpture park.

== Artist's intention ==
There has been some debate as to the intention of the park and whether it was a dedication to the enslaved Africans that were thrown overboard during the journey through the Middle Passage from West Africa to the Americas. In response the artist says "It was never my intention to have any connection to the Middle passage. Although it was not my intention from the outset I am very encouraged how it has resonated differently within various communities and feel it is working as an art piece by questioning our identity, history, and stimulating debate." The following quote states Taylor's original intention: Vicissitudes depicts a circle of figures, all linked through holding hands. These are life-size casts taken from a group of children of diverse ethnic backgrounds. Circular in structure ... the work both withstands strong currents and replicates one of the primary geometric shapes, evoking ideas of unity and continuum. ... The sculpture proposes growth, chance, and natural transformation. It shows how time and environment impact on and shape the physical body. Children by nature are adaptive to their surroundings. Their use within the work highlights the importance of creating a sustainable and well-managed environment, a space for future generations. --Jason deCaires Taylor

== Conservation ==
The coral reef around Grenada suffered damage from Hurricane Ivan in 2004 and Emily in 2005. It has been recorded that only 10–15% of the seabed has a substratum solid enough for natural reefs to grow upon and it can take between 10 and 80 years for hard coral to develop, while it is predicted that up to 60% of natural coral reefs may be depleted by 2050. The sculptures have been designed to promote coral growth using techniques to reduce the pH of the cement and by applying a textured surface. This encourages coral polyps to attach onto the surface and eventually the structure will become a sanctuary for small marine life. Over time coral will change their appearance and the tides will enhance the texture applied bringing with it new inhabitants. Already Taylor's sculptures have been shown to be a home to an array of aquatic life, including flounder, parrot fish, branded coral shrimp and fire worms.

Artificial reef constructions like Taylor's and those from the US company Reef Ball are designed and constructed using resilient, stable and environmentally responsive materials. They are positioned in the ocean at the correct time of year to coincide with coral spawning, in an area that has suffered previous substantial decimation from storm damage. His works carry the aim of relieving the strain placed on the natural coral reef by human pollution, acidification, and overfishing, by redirecting divers and snorkelers away from natural reefs to allow the opportunity for repair and regeneration. In an article in Symposium Magazine Taylor is quoted: "The underwater sculpture gallery is a project aiming to create a unique space which highlights environmental processes and explores the complex relationships between art and its environment. This unique project will provide an unparalleled opportunity to explore a dynamic seascape and to appreciate the island's beauty and diversity".

== Notable sculptures ==
Grace Reef was installed in 2006 at a depth of 12 feet. The first installation is in the hurricane damaged bay of Molinere and consists of 16 concrete statues cast from the body of a local Grenadian woman and positioned lying down on the sea floor. After 14 months the figures had begun to distort with the inhabitation of life.

The Lost Correspondent was installed in 2006 at a depth of 22 feet. Referenced to be a modern-day Vesuvius disaster, he is a lone concrete figure at a desk poised over a typewriter. The surface of the desk is covered with a selection of newspaper articles dating back to the 1970s with many holding political significance from the Cuban alignment before the revolution.

The Unstill Life, installed in 2006 at a depth of 25 feet, is a classical study of an artist's still life using simple modern day objects like a table, vase and fruit bowl. The static sculpture over time has its appearance constantly changed by the course of nature.

Vicissitudes, installed in 2007 at a depth of 14 feet, is Taylor's most recognised work in the park: a ring of 26 standing children, holding hands and facing outwards into the current. The design took six months to make, weighed 15 tonnes in dry cement and was constructed to withstand strong currents and tidal motion. The ring symbolises the concept of life's ongoing cycle and highlights the importance of creating a sustainable and well managed environment for future generations, holding reference to the ability of children adapt to their surroundings.

The Fall From Grace, installed in 2007 at a depth of 21 feet, is a life size male figure riding a bicycle. After 8 months in the ocean, aquatic life was already making it a home.

Tam CC Project was installed in 2007 at a depth of 6 feet. It is a construction of 18 concrete heads fixed to a rock face in shallow water. Casts were made of students' faces from T. A. Marryshow Community College, Grenada.

== See also ==
- Marine biology – Scientific study of ocean life
- Cancún Underwater Museum – Underwater display of sculpture in Cancún, Mexico
- Shark River Reef – Artificial reef off New Jersey
- Gibraltar Artificial Reef – Collection of sunken wrecks
- Sinking ships for wreck diving sites – Scuttling old ships to produce artificial reefs
- Osborne Reef – Artificial reef off Fort Lauderdale, Florida, US
