= USS Algol (AKA-54) =

Andromeda-class attack cargo ship

Coordinates: 40.1269°N 73.6564°W

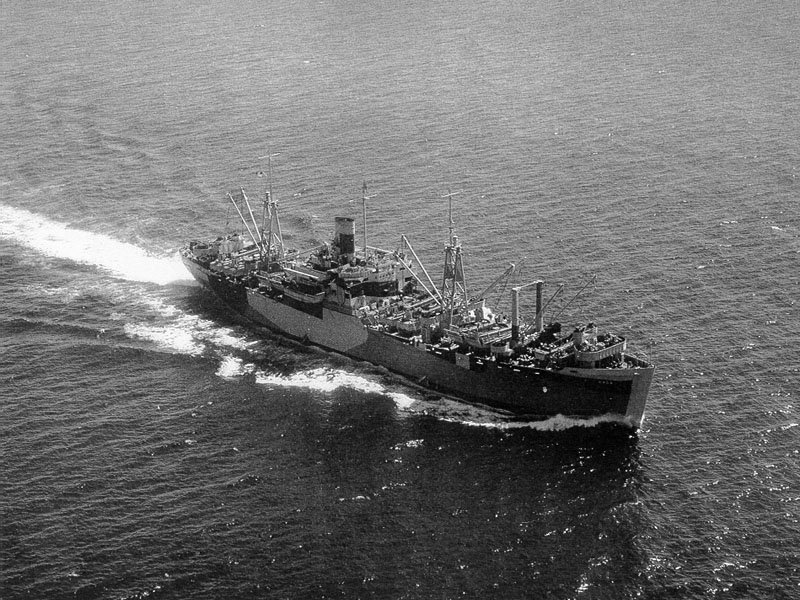
- USS Algol (AKA-54), underway off the coast of southern California, 22 September 1944. US Navy photo taken from a NAS Santa Ana, based Blimp Squadron ZP-31 Airship by ENS. Borg.

History

United States
- Name: James Barnes (1942–1943); Algol (1943–1977)
- Namesake: The star Algol in the constellation Perseus
- Ordered: as type (C2-S-B1) hull, MC hull 1153
- Builder: Moore Dry Dock Company, Oakland, California
- Laid down: 10 December 1942
- Launched: 17 February 1943
- Commissioned: 27 November 1943 (reduced commission)
- Decommissioned: 3 December 1943
- Renamed: Algol, 30 August 1943
- Recommissioned: 21 July 1944 (full commission)
- Decommissioned: 2 January 1958
- Recommissioned: 17 November 1961
- Decommissioned: 23 July 1970
- Reclassified: LKA-54, 1 January 1969
- Stricken: 1 January 1977
- Identification: Hull symbol: AKA-54 (1944-1969); Hull symbol: LKA-54 (1969–1977); Code letters: NHHF
- Honors and awards: 2 battle stars (World War II); 5 battle stars (Korea)
- Fate: Sunk as part of the New Jersey Shark River artificial reef, 18 November 1991

General characteristics
- Class & type: Andromeda-class attack cargo ship
- Tonnage: 4,450 DWT
- Displacement: 6,556 long tons (6,661 t) light; 13,910 long tons (14,130 t) full load
- Length: 459 ft 2 in (139.95 m)
- Beam: 63 ft (19 m)
- Draft: 26 ft 4 in (8.03 m)
- Installed power: 2 × Foster–Wheeler D-type 450 psi (3,100 kPa) 750 °F (399 °C) steam boilers; 6,000 shp (4,500 kW)
- Propulsion: 1 × General Electric steam turbine; General Electric double reduction main gears; 1 × Propeller
- Speed: 16 kn (30 km/h; 18 mph)
- Boats & landing craft carried: 8 × LCMs; 1 × LCPL; 15 × LCVPs
- Complement: 247
- Armament: 1 × 5 in (127 mm)/38 caliber dual-purpose gun; 4 × twin 40 mm (1.6 in) Bofors anti-aircraft (AA) mounts; 18 × 20 mm (0.8 in) Oerlikon cannons AA

USS Algol (AKA-54) was an Andromeda-class attack cargo ship. She was the first ship of the United States Navy by this name, after Algol, a fixed star in the constellation Perseus. Algol served as a commissioned ship for 22 years and 1 month.

She was laid down on 10 December 1942, as James Barnes, a United States Maritime Commission Type C2-S-B1 hull, under United States Maritime Commission contract (MC hull 1153), at Moore Dry Dock Company, in Oakland, California. She was launched on 17 February 1943, renamed Algol on 30 August 1943, and placed in reduced commission on 27 November 1943 for transit to Willamette Shipyard, Portland, Oregon, for completion as an attack cargo ship. She was decommissioned at Portland on 3 December 1943, and recommissioned USS Algol (AKA-54), on 21 July 1944 at Willamette Shipyard.

== Service history ==
=== World War II ===
==== 1944 ====
Algol completed shakedown training along the California coast by 3 September. She then put into Oakland and began loading cargo. She departed Oakland on 4 October bound for the western Pacific. Steaming via Eniwetok Atoll, she arrived at Saipan in the Mariana Islands late in October. After unloading her cargo at Saipan, Algol got underway for New Guinea on 31 October. The attack cargo ship put into Hollandia on 6 November and remained there two days before pushing on to Nouméa, New Caledonia, where she stopped between 24 November and 17 December. On 17 December, Algol headed for Guadalcanal where she participated in landing exercises in preparation for the assault on Luzon at Lingayen Gulf. At the end of the year, she moved up to the staging area at Manus in the Admiralty Islands.

==== 1945 ====
On 2 January 1945, the attack cargo ship put to sea as an element of Task Unit (TU) 78.11.7. Along the way, many reports came in of submarines, torpedoes, and unidentified aircraft. However, no verified attacks occurred. Algol and her colleagues arrived safely in Lingayen Gulf on 11 January. Her boats and boat crews went immediately to help unload President Monroe. The attack transport began her own unloading the following day. She completed cargo operations on 13 January and got underway for Leyte on the 15th. During that voyage, she also towed President Monroe which had suffered a main propulsion plant casualty. The two ships arrived in San Pedro Bay on 20 January. There, she immediately began loading for a second invasion of Luzon. When she arrived off the coast of Zambales province on the western coast of Luzon just north of Subic Bay, she and the other ships found things very peaceful. And so, it was. The entire area was in the friendly hands of Filipino guerrillas. The pre-landing bombardment was cancelled, and troops and cargo moved ashore easily.

Upon her return to Leyte on 3 February, Algol spent about six weeks catching up on minor ship repairs, and her crew enjoyed more frequent liberty. By mid-March, however, it was time to get back in the war, and she began preparations for the assault on the Ryukyu Islands. On 27 March, the attack cargo ship departed Leyte with cargo and elements of the 184th Regimental Combat Team (RCT), 7th Infantry Division, embarked. She arrived off Okinawa early in the morning of 1 April and began unloading soon after the invasion started. That night, instead of retiring with the other transports and cargo ships, Algol moved into the inner transport area to serve as a tender for the landing craft.

The ship remained at Okinawa until 10 April at which time she shaped a course for Guam in company with TU 51.29.12. From Guam, Algol continued east to Hawaii and thence to San Diego, California, where she arrived on 4 May. A three-week availability followed. On 28 May, the attack cargo ship embarked upon a voyage to Hawaii, from which she returned to the west coast at San Francisco on 18 June. She put to sea once again on 6 July bound for the western Pacific. After stops at Eniwetok and Ulithi en route, the ship arrived at Kerama Retto off Okinawa on 9 September. From there, she moved down to the northern Solomons, arriving at Cape Torokina, Bougainville, on 4 October. There, she loaded cargo and equipment for Marine Air Group (MAG) 25 for transportation to China. Algol arrived in Tsingtao, China, early in November, unloaded her cargo, and departed that port at the end of the third week in November.

=== Pacific and Atlantic, 1946–1949 ===
For the next two years, she carried passengers and cargo between various points in China, Japan, the islands of the central and western Pacific as well as to and from ports on the west coast of the United States. In July 1947, she was placed in commission, in reserve, preparatory to decommissioning. However, during the inactivation process, the attack cargo ship was ordered back to active service. By late summer of 1949, she was back in full commission operating out of Little Creek, Virginia, under Commander, Amphibious Forces, Atlantic Fleet. Near the end of August, Algol embarked elements of the 7th Marine Division at Morehead City, North Carolina, and sailed for the Mediterranean Sea. After visiting a number of ports along the shores of that sea and conducting operations with American naval forces in the area, the attack cargo ship returned to Norfolk in February 1950.

=== Korean War ===
==== 1950 ====
In August 1950, just weeks after the outbreak of the Korean War, she was transferred to the Pacific. The ship embarked elements of the 1st Marine Division at San Diego and set sail for Kobe, Japan, on 31 August. Algol arrived in Kobe on 16 September but put to sea again the following day to join in the Inchon invasion. The initial assault at Inchon had gone forward the day before Algol's arrival in Japan. Her mission, therefore, was one of resupply and reinforcement. She remained at Inchon, unloading, from 21 to 27 September. On the 28th the attack cargo ship headed back to Japan.

Algol returned to Inchon on 8 October and embarked Headquarters Company, 1st Ordnance Battalion, 1st Marine Division, for what was to have been an amphibious assault at Wonsan on the northwestern coast of Korea. However, United Nations (UN) naval gunfire and air activity forced the North Koreans back from the coastal plain into the highlands. This enabled Republic of Korea forces ashore to move northward and occupy Wonsan themselves. UN troops, therefore, landed unopposed during the last week in October. Following that, the ship returned to Japan and remained there until early December.

At that time, the Chinese intervened in force and sent the UN forces reeling southward. Algol went to Chinnampo where she assisted in the evacuation of UN troops during the first week in December. The following week, she moved to Inchon to help evacuate troops at that location.

==== 1951–1952 ====
Those operations lasted until the beginning of the second week in January 1951. For the next two months, the attack cargo ship visited a number of ports in both Japan and Korea. Early in March, she participated in an amphibious feint at Chinnampo and then headed back to Japan. In late April and early May, Algol visited Hong Kong. There, she embarked the British 28th Brigade and transported it to Inchon. After that mission, she returned to Japan where she conducted amphibious exercises until 17 June. On that day, the ship shaped a course back to the United States. She arrived in San Diego, California, on 30 June.

Between July 1951 and March 1952, she conducted training missions along the coast of southern California and between there and the Hawaiian Islands. She completed a yard period in Pearl Harbor in March 1952 and put to sea on her way to the Far East. She arrived in Japan late that month and took part in amphibious exercises off the island of Hokkaidō. Algol visited Yokosuka early in April and, from there, moved to Hong Kong for a two-week port call. May brought a visit to Subic Bay in the Philippines followed by more training exercises at Otaru, Japan. Exercises with units of the 7th Fleet punctuated by visits to a number of Oriental ports occupied her time for most of the remainder of 1952. By December, the attack cargo ship was on her way back to the west coast. She arrived in Long Beach, California, on 15 December 1952.

=== Pacific Fleet, 1953–1958 ===
Training and amphibious exercises – broken only by a repair period at the Todd Shipyard at Alameda, California, that summer – filled her time throughout the year 1953 and into the second month of 1954. On 19 February 1954, Algol departed the west coast bound for Japan. She entered port at Yokosuka on 9 March. In April, the ship participated in exercises at Iwo Jima, and June brought another series of exercises at Okinawa. The usual round of port visits and exercises followed. Early in August, she concluded a two-week visit at Hong Kong and headed – via Subic Bay – to Tourane and Hai Phong in North Vietnam. At those ports, the attack cargo ship embarked non-communist refugees and carried them south to Saigon in South Vietnam. "Operation Passage to Freedom" came on the heels of the defeat of the French by the Viet Minh and the division of the Vietnamese portion of Indochina into the communist north and the republican south. She made three voyages between the north and the south by 12 September at which time she headed back to Yokosuka. On 21 September, Algol shaped a course back to the United States. She entered San Francisco, California, on 7 October 1954.

Later that month, she moved south to her new home port, San Diego. Normal west coast operations, including a series of amphibious exercises, carried her through the remainder of 1954 and well into 1955. In August 1955, the attack cargo ship entered the Mare Island Naval Shipyard for a regular overhaul. She completed repairs in November and, after refresher training out of San Diego, resumed normal operations out of her home port. That occupation lasted a little more than two years. On 2 January 1958, she was decommissioned and assigned to the Bremerton Group, Pacific Reserve Fleet.

=== Atlantic Fleet, 1961–1970 ===
Algol was recommissioned on 17 November 1961 at the Northwest Marine Iron Works at Portland, Oregon. After shakedown training out of San Diego, the attack cargo ship departed that port on 12 January 1962 on her way to duty with the Atlantic Fleet. She was assigned to Amphibious Group (PhibGru) 2, Amphibious Squadron (PhibRon) 4, Atlantic Fleet, and spent most of 1962 operating in the West Indies. Notable among her assignments in the fall of 1962 was as a support unit for the "quarantine" of Cuba imposed by President John F. Kennedy during the 1962 Cuban Missile Crisis.

Algol spent the remaining seven years of her Navy career operating primarily along the east coast of the United States and in the West Indies. That duty consisted almost solely of amphibious warfare training in conjunction with Marines. The only break in that schedule of operations came at the end of the summer of 1964. At that time, the attack cargo ship deployed to the Mediterranean Sea to participate in the massive amphibious exercise "Operation Steel Pike I." By early 1965, she returned to more familiar waters and spent the remaining years of her career operating along the eastern seaboard and in the West Indies. During that period, on 1 January 1969, the attack cargo ship was redesignated an amphibious cargo ship and was assigned the hull designation LKA-54.

== Decommissioning and fate ==
Algol was decommissioned on 23 July 1970 and was transferred to the Maritime Administration's National Defense Reserve Fleet at James River, Virginia. Her name was struck from the Navy list on 1 January 1977. Algol was sunk as part of New Jersey's Shark River artificial reef on 18 November 1991.

== Awards ==
- Asiatic–Pacific Campaign Medal with two battle stars
- World War II Victory Medal
- Navy Occupation Medal with "ASIA" and "EUROPE" clasps
- China Service Medal
- National Defense Service Medal with star
- Korean Service Medal with five battle stars
- Philippine Liberation Medal
- United Nations Service Medal

== Bibliography ==
- "Algol I (AKA-54)". Dictionary of American Naval Fighting Ships. Naval History and Heritage Command. 16 June 2015. This article incorporates text from this source, which is in the public domain.
