= Cancún Underwater Museum =

Underwater display of sculpture in Cancún, Mexico

- Museo Subacuático de Arte
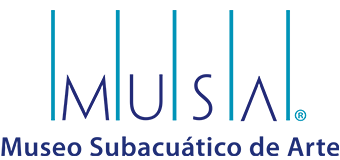

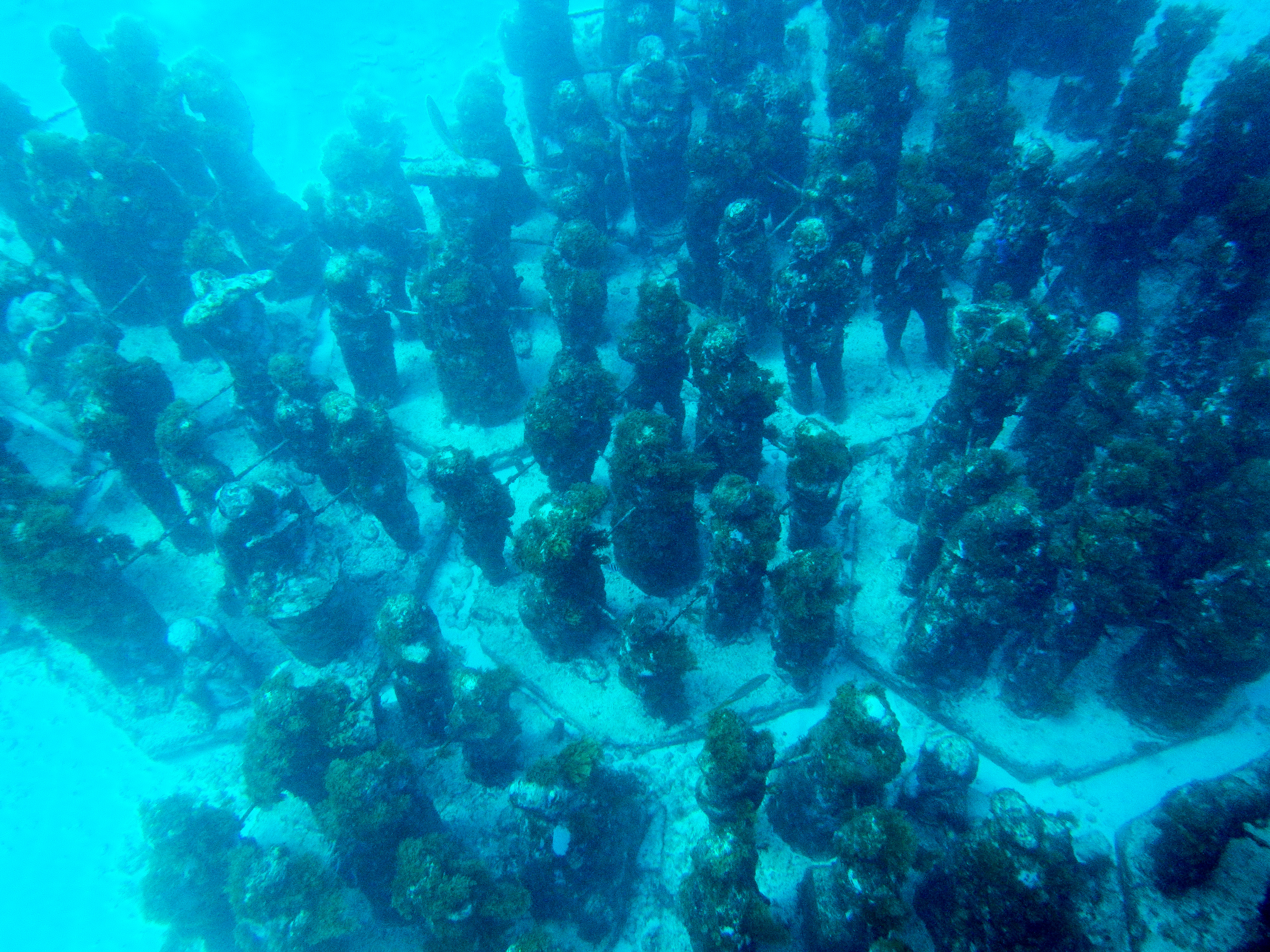
- The Silent Evolution, a sculpture by Jason deCaires Taylor

- Location in Mexico
- Location: Cerrada Las Golondrinas 24, Alfredo Bonfil, 77560 Cancún, Mexico
- Type: Underwater Museum
- Collection size: 500 sculptures
- Visitors: 200,000 per year
- Founders: Roberto Díaz Abraham & Jaime González Cano
- Architect: Sculptor
- Website: musamexico.org

The Cancún Underwater Museum (Spanish: Museo Subacuático de Arte, known as MUSA) is a non-profit organization based in Cancún, Mexico devoted to the art of conservation. The museum has a total of 500 sculptures, by a series of international and local sculptors, with three different galleries submerged between three and six meters (9.8 and 19.6 ft ) deep in the ocean at the Cancún National Marine Park. The museum was thought up by Marine Park Director Jaime González Cano, with the objective of saving the nearby coral reefs by providing an alternative destination for divers. It was started in 2009 and officially opened in November 2010.

== History ==
At the beginning of 2008, Jaime González Cano began to create the plans for an underwater museum that would be formed by nature into a coral reef.

Dr. Jaime González Cano, the Director of the National Park Costa Occidental Isla Mujeres, Punta Cancún y Punta Nizuc, saw that the natural coral reefs were being damaged by tourists, anchors, and divers. In particular the largest coral reef in Cancún, Manchones Reef, was receiving the most damage because it is the most often visited by divers and snorkelers.

Early in 2005 González Cano suggested to the then President of the Cancún Nautical Association, Roberto Díaz Abraham, the idea of taking snorkelers and divers to an area where concrete reefs with some corals had been placed, to draw them away from Manchones reef. By January 2008, Díaz Abraham walked away from the project, believing that it would take many more years for the artificial coral gardens to flourish and become an attraction, but González Cano persisted and organized a meeting, where he presented the idea of deploying underwater concrete sculptures as artificial habitats to the advisory Nautical-Tourism Subcommittee. This, as a strategy to redirect visitors away from coral areas damaged by hurricanes and the accumulated impact of visitors. Having done research looking for an experienced underwater sculptor, Dr. González Cano came across Jason deCaires Taylor, who had been pioneering the use of underwater sculptures for the creation of artificial reefs on a project in Grenada that demonstrated the value of art in conservation, the Molinere Underwater Sculpture Park. He was a diving instructor in the Caribbean at the time, which also allowed him to see art in a different way.

The Nautical-Tourism Advisory Subcommittee, where Roberto Díaz played an important role as President of the Nautical Association, agreed with the idea and to the plan presented by Dr. González for a series of artists to create an underwater sculpture museum. With Federal funds support, community participation and funds from the Nautical Association Trust, MUSA invited and hired Taylor to do the initial work of producing first 4 sculptures out of more than 500 that have been deployed. As he began to build up first sculptures, The National Park staff in conducted by Dr. González Cano, and with the collaboration of Roberto Díaz as President of the Nautical Association produced the Environmental Impact Assessment which, as from October 2009, provides the legal basis for the deployment of 1,412 artificial habitats, in 10 sites (galleries) of the National Park for the following 50 years. The park was enriched with other international artists such as a Mexican Artist Karen Salinas Martinez (Sculpted SEASCAPES), Mexican Artist Rodrigo Quiñones Reyes (sculpted BIOMAP), English Artist Jessica Miles and Nelson Gamboa from Colombia including an excellent team of local workers. The first four sculptures were deployed underwater in November 2009, and most of Taylor's The Silent Evolution had been installed by the end of 2010. The museum officially opened on November 27, 2010, shortly before the start of the Cancún climate summit.

By the end of 2013, five years after the foundation of MUSA, a total of 500 concrete sculptures had been placed on the ocean floor. 477 are exhibited in the Manchones gallery and 23 in the Nizuc gallery. In addition, 26 replicas and one original are located at a visitor center at Plaza Kukulcán, a mall in the Hotel Zone of Cancún. More than 100,000 visitors, out of 500,000 that visited the Government Protected Area, visited MUSA during 2013.

== Museum ==
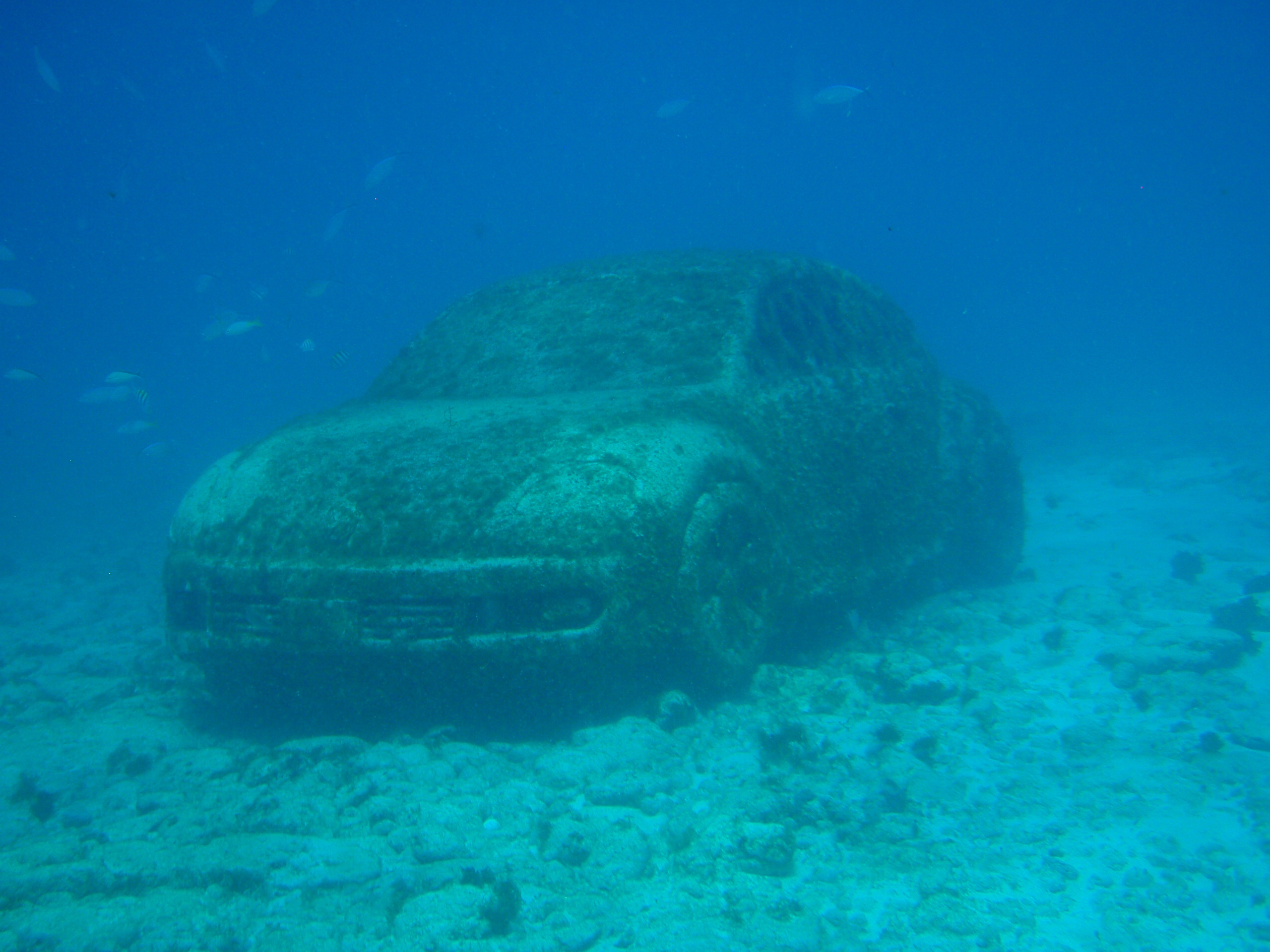
A Volkswagen car at the museum

MUSA obtained a permit to sink 1,412 artificial habitats (sculptures) in 10 different areas within the National Marine Park. So far only two have been developed, Manchones reef with 477 sculptures (21°12′06″N 86°43′37″W) and Punta Nizuc with 23 structures (21°01′44″N 86°46′47″W). A new installation by Cuban sculptor Elier Amado Gil, Blessings, is to be placed in a new gallery called Chitales. Snorkelers, scuba divers, and tourists can visit the underwater exhibits via a glass-bottom boat.

To place the statues on the ocean floor, Taylor had a special lift made for the statues so none would be damaged during the move. A forty-ton crane was placed on a commercial ferry in order to lower the sculptures. Some are so heavy that they had to be lifted into the water using lift bags. The sculptures are created with pH-neutral marine concrete, made with the help of marine park officials and the Cancún Nautical Association, and are created above ground and cleaned before being taken underwater so they do not have any chemicals on them that may harm the water, animals, or reef.

Jason deCaires Taylor's The Silent Evolution consists of more than 400 human figures depicted interacting with the environment around them, with both a positive and negative impact. He shows how humans can live with nature and make a workable future between the two, but also how humans have damaged nature, specifically the coral reefs, and show no sympathy.

The statues in The Silent Evolution show how some humans see their surrounding and embrace them while others hide their faces. Each statue was made to resemble members of a local fishing community where Taylor lives. Each statue has its own personality and features. Taylor made sure every detail from the hair to the clothes of the statues was perfect. They include a little girl with a faint smile on her face looking up to the surface; six businessmen with their heads in the sand, not paying attention to their surroundings; and even a man behind a desk with his dog lying beside him, but looking tired and uninvolved in the environment. The work took Taylor 18 months and 120 hours of working underwater and used 120 tons of concrete, sand, and gravel, 3,800m (2.3 miles ) of fiberglass, and 400 kg (881 lbs ) of silicone.

Taylor planted pieces of coral from damaged reefs on some of the first sculptures. The Silent Evolution is a two-part art installation: the underwater sculptures themselves are the first part, while the second is how nature will transform them as coral grows and a new reef forms.

In March 2011 a new installation by Taylor, What Have We Done?, opened at Punta Nizuc.

One exhibit room is on shore in a mall, Plaza Kukulcán, with 26 replicas and one original ceramic sculpture by Roberto Díaz Abraham, The Ocean Muse.

== Benefits ==
The underwater museum is to benefit the protection of the coral reefs by redirecting visitors away from natural reef formations, while damaged coral formations receive restoration treatment and by reducing the direct human impact. Artificial reefs are usually created by sunken ships and other objects that have fallen to the bottom of the ocean floor. The statues as artificial habitatas are, a new technique and material for coral to grow on, a means for art to save the oceans. As the statues were made with pH-neutral cement, coral, seaweed, and algae are able to grow and develop better than on an old ship. Stable structures with a stable base are known to be ideal surfaces for artificial reefs. The statues also have holes in them, which allow marine wildlife to colonize and feed off the coral. Coral reefs will increase, but so will marine life. After only a short time under the water, the statues began to be transformed by nature. In time, all the statues will be covered and their figures will barely be visible

The museum also benefits the community by attracting tourists. One local guide expressed concern to a reporter that the statues will themselves be damaged, but the museum is planned to grow and to repair itself.

== See also ==
- Marine biology – Scientific study of ocean life
- Molinere Underwater Sculpture Park – Collection of underwater contemporary art off Grenada in the Caribbean
- Shark River Reef – Artificial reef off New Jersey
- Gibraltar Artificial Reef – Collection of sunken wrecks
- Sinking ships for wreck diving sites – Scuttling old ships to produce artificial reefs
- Osborne Reef – Artificial reef off Fort Lauderdale, Florida, US
