= John Brewer Reef =

Reef in Australia

Coordinates: 18.629°S 147.053°E

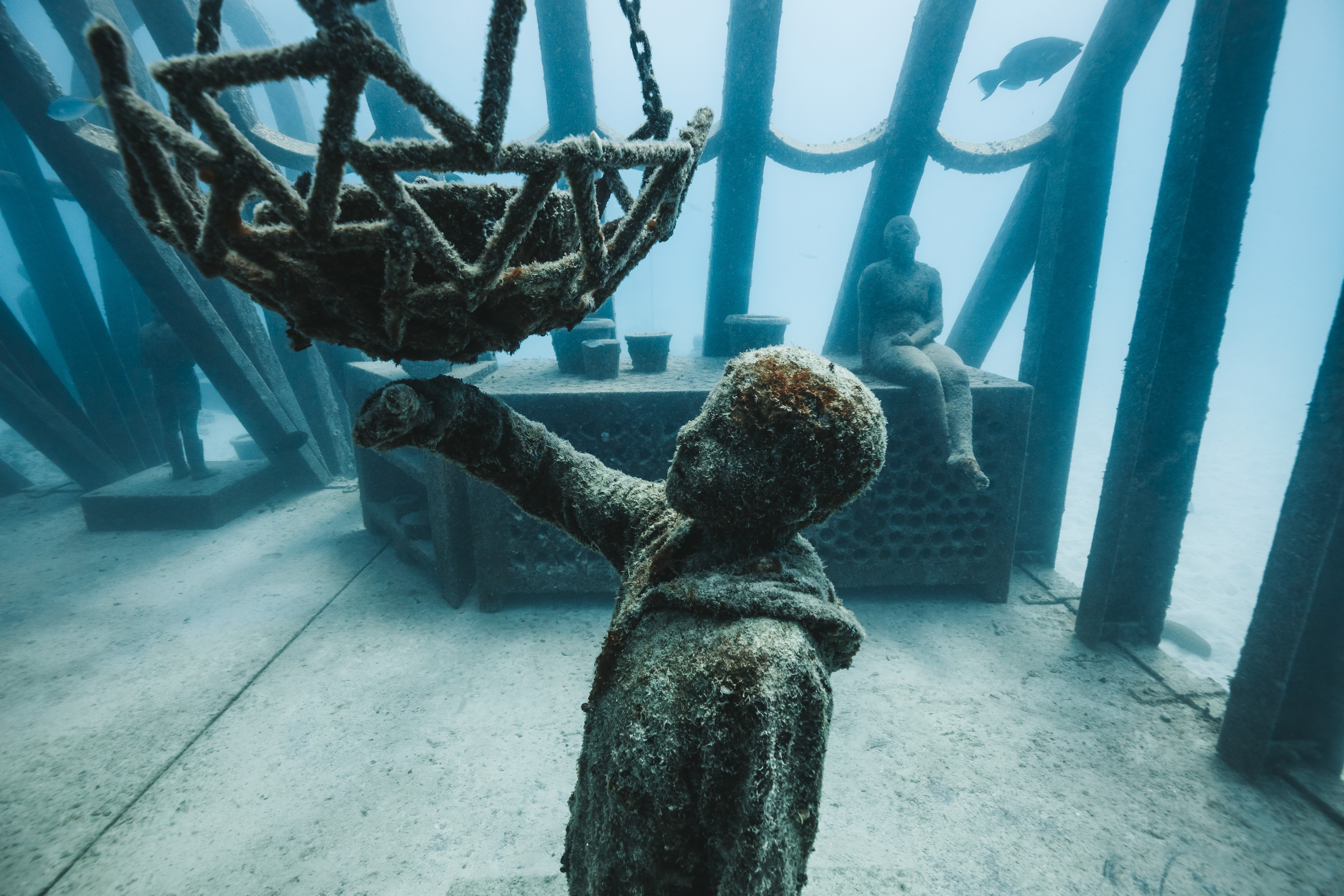
The coral greenhouse is located in the great barrier reef marine park at John Brewer reef

John Brewer Reef is located 70 km (43 mi) offshore from Townsville, Queensland, Australia, and measures 6.1 km × 2.8 km (3.8 mi × 1.7 mi). The origin of the reef's name is from the troop ships John Brewer, Kelso and Arab which sailed from Sydney for India on 16 June 1842. On board were 26 officers and 700 men of the 28th (North Gloucestershire) Regiment of Foot (The Slashers). On 30 June 1842, all ships grounded on reefs north-east of Palm Island. The reef where the John Brewer struck is known as Slashers Reefs after then 28th Regiment's nickname.

John Brewer Reef is notable as the site of the world's first floating hotel, now the Hotel Haegumgang, and of The Coral Greenhouse, which is one of the sculptures created by Jason deCaires Taylor for the Museum of Underwater Art (MOUA) and at 12 m × 9 m × 9.3 m (39 ft × 30 ft × 31 ft) and 165 t (162 long tons; 182 short tons) is the world's largest underwater art structure.

John Brewer Reef is within the Great Barrier Reef Marine Park. In March 2022 reef-wide cover of hard corals was 21.8 %, with some concerns from mass coral bleaching. Citizen scientists have reported over 240 species of fish and invertebrates, with the most notable being the whitetip reef shark.
