= Hotel Haegumgang =

Floating hotel

Coordinates: 38.7258767°N 128.2054575°E

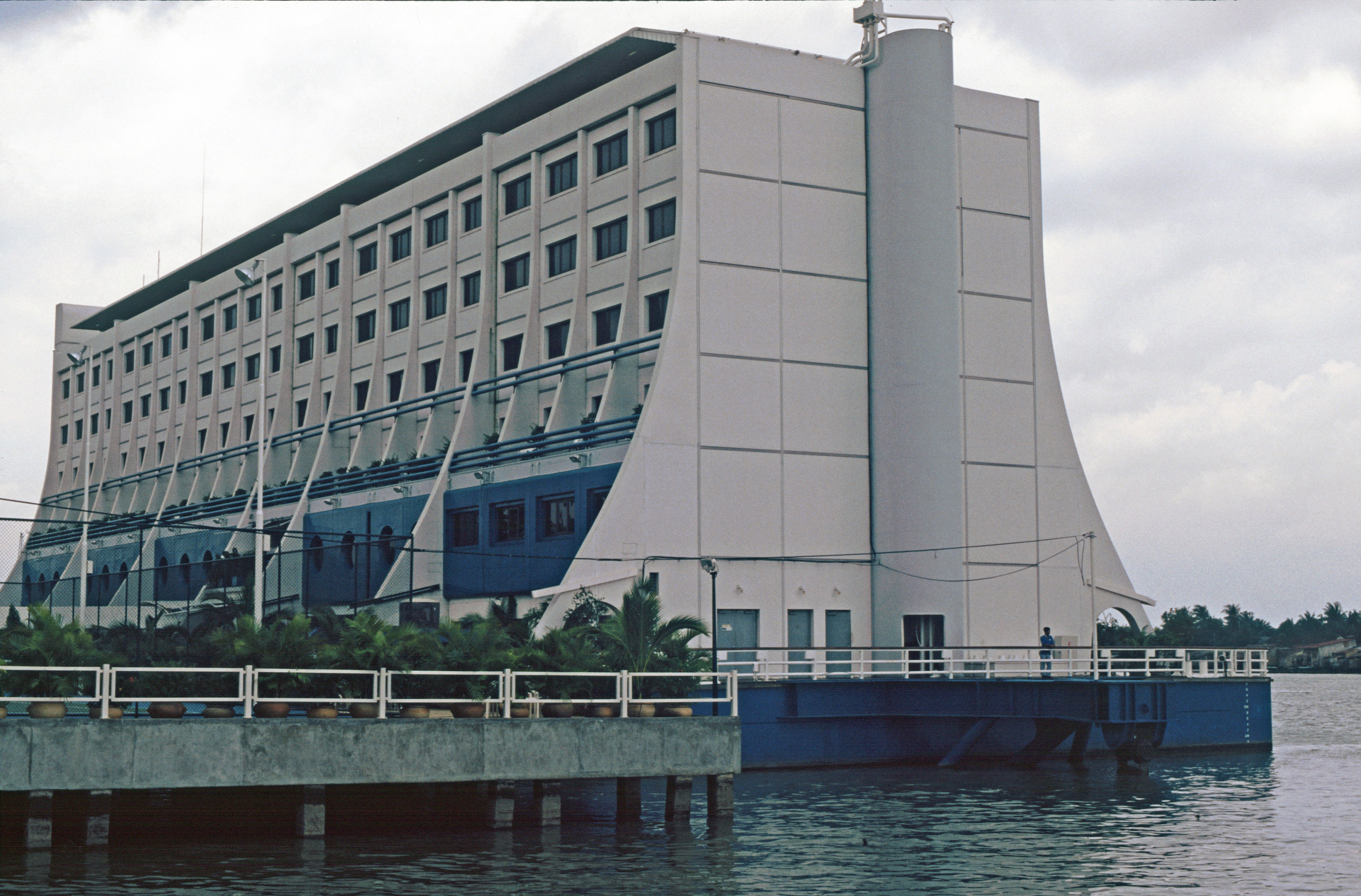
- Hotel Haegumgang (then Saigon Floating Hotel) in Ho Chi Minh City, 1991
- Former names: Four Seasons Barrier Reef Resort; John Brewer Floating Hotel; Saigon Floating Hotel

General information
- Location: John Brewer Reef (1988); Ho Chi Minh City (1989–1998); Mount Kumgang (1998–2022)
- Opened: 9 March 1988
- Closed: July 2008
- Demolished: March 2022

Height
- Height: 24.2 m (79 ft)

Dimensions
- Diameter: 89.2 m × 27.6 m (293 ft × 91 ft)
- Weight: 10,960 tonnes

Technical details
- Floor count: 7

Design and construction
- Architect: Sten Sjöstrand
- Developer: Doug Tarca
- Structural engineer: Consafe Engineering
- Main contractor: Betlehem Singapore Pty. Ltd.

Other information
- Number of rooms: 140 (Note: At the time of the hotel's 1998 opening.)
- Number of suites: 34
- Number of restaurants: 2

The Hotel Haegumgang (Korean: 호텔해금강), originally the Four Seasons Barrier Reef Resort and formerly the Saigon Floating Hotel, was a floating hotel originally designed to exploit the tourism potential of the Great Barrier Reef in Australia. The Four Seasons Barrier Reef Resort opened on 9 March 1988 and was initially situated in the shallow John Brewer Reef, 70 kilometres (43 miles) northeast of Townsville.

The floating hotel quickly proved to be economically unviable, attributed to frequent bad weather, its remote location, and a series of incidents that undermined public confidence. In April 1989, the hotel was purchased by EIE International and relocated to Ho Chi Minh City in Vietnam, where it became the city's first five-star hotel and a commercial success. Renamed the Saigon Floating Hotel, the floating hotel was open in Ho Chi Minh City from November 1989 to August 1996. Once more running into financial troubles, the hotel was purchased by Hyundai Asan in 1998. Hyundai Asan relocated the hotel to the Mount Kumgang Tourist Region in North Korea and renamed it to the Hotel Haegumgang. Part of an effort to sustain large-scale tourism projects in North Korea during a thaw in bilateral relations with South Korea, Hotel Haegumgang was open from October 2000 until Hyundai Asan suspended operations in July 2008.

After being shut down, the Hotel Haegumgang remained docked at Mount Kumgang. It is unclear whether it was used by the North Koreans during this time. The hotel was dismantled by the North Korean government on the orders of Kim Jong Un in March 2022.

== Background ==
=== Conception ===
The Great Barrier Reef of Australia is the largest coral reef system in the world and a popular tourist destination. In the 1980s, Australian tour operators sought to further exploit the reef's tourism potential by making trips faster and shorter, or by creating offshore accommodation for tourists. Such offshore accommodation would be able to provide permanent access to the reef, preferably with facilities that did not need to be docked for repairs.

In November 1981, a month after the reef was designated a World Heritage Site, a group of businesspeople from Townsville, Queensland proposed the construction of an artificial island on the Great Barrier Reef. This idea was the brainchild of Doug Tarca (1929–1993), an Italian-born entrepreneur. Tarca had long been fascinated by the reef and was committed to conserving it and making it more accessible to the public. The planned island would have been placed in the John Brewer Reef—a shallow coral reef lagoon situated about 70 kilometres (43 miles) northeast of Townsville—and was to consist of three ocean cruise ships permanently placed on the seabed, underwater walk tubes, and an artificial sand cay, altogether designed to support 3,000 guests. Because of projected maintenance costs and potential environmental impact, this initial proposal was discarded.

Doug Tarca and his wife Marie established their own reef-related businesses, such as Tarca's Coral Gardens, an onshore coral display in South Townsville that showcased fluorescent corals. In 1983, Tarca established Reef Link, a catamaran service that offered daily transport of tourists from Townsville to pontoons moored in the John Brewer Reef. Guests could sunbathe, swim, snorkel, and scuba dive in the reef. Underwater reef tours were also offered in the Yellow Submarine, a glass-bottomed semi-submersible designed by Tarca himself.

=== Proposal and preparations ===
In March 1983, a group of businesspeople headed by Tarca made a second proposal for permanent accommodation in the John Brewer Reef. This time, the idea was to build a floating hotel, which was believed to be cheaper and more environmentally friendly than an artificial island. In March 1985, a draft environmental impact statement for the structure was completed and submitted for review. The Great Barrier Reef Marine Park Authority (GBRMPA) issued a conditional permit for a floating hotel in December 1985, the first permit of its kind.

Because of the unorthodox concept, it was reportedly challenging to raise the venture capital for the floating hotel. In April 1986, Four Seasons Hotels Limited was awarded with a ten-year contract for marketing and operating the hotel. The company Barrief Reef Holdings Limited was established in the same year for the hotel and began to be listed in the stock exchanges of Australia and New Zealand in September.

=== Design ===
Illustration of the floating hotel in the John Brewer Reef, from Popular Mechanics (January 1988)

The floating hotel was designed by the Swedish engineer and maritime archaeologist Sten Sjöstrand. The final design was a seven-story structure, capable of accommodating 356 guests in a total of 140 double rooms and 34 luxury suites. The rooms were small by hotel standards, similar in size to the cabins of a cruise ship. The main hotel structure measured 89.2 metres (292.7 ft) in length and 27.6 metres (90.6 ft) in width, and rose to 24.2 metres (79.4 ft) above sea level. The hotel weighed 10,960 tonnes (loaded displacement). The hotel's projected 98 staff members were assigned to live on the top floor, the least desirable part of the structure since it swung around the most during bad weather.

In addition to the main structure, there were also adjacent floating pontoons that functioned as walkways and had moorings, as well as a swimming pool and tennis courts. Inside, the hotel had two restaurants, a nightclub, a disco, two bars, a sauna, a gym, a library, a research lab, a diving gear shop, a 100-seat theater, and a 50-seat underwater observatory. The decor above deck was dominated by a black lacquer finish, cool coral tones, and brass. The two original restaurants of the hotel, one of which was named The Coral Trout, were specialized in seafood. Barges brought in supplies weekly, and fresh fruit and vegetables were restocked through daily runs by boat and helicopter. Helicopters could land on a connected, floating helipad.

The hotel was a barge-type structure, without any propulsion systems of its own. In order to function, the hotel had to be completely self-contained, using desalination and diesel. The engineering systems of the hotel were identical to those of a mid-size cruise ship. Located below the main deck, there was a steel-plated corridor through the hotel's "spine", with water-tight rooms that housed a desalination plant, three diesel generators, ballast tank controls, a repair shop, sewage-treatment machinery, and a large air-conditioning system. The hotel had a ballast capacity of 4,000 tonnes, a fuel oil capacity of 200 tonnes, a generating capacity of 2300 kW, and required a daily drinking water supply of 150 tonnes.

== Construction ==
The hotel was designed by Consafe Engineering and built by Betlehem Singapore Pty. Ltd. in Singapore. Construction began in June 1986 and continued in the summer of 1987. The hotel cost an estimated A$45 million to build. The hotel was insured by Lloyd's of London and telephones were installed by Telecom Australia.

Due to a contract dispute, delivery of the finished hotel was delayed until January 1988. The hotel was towed from Singapore to the John Brewer Reef with a heavy-lift ship. The John Brewer Reef has a narrow 60-metre (200 ft) wide opening on its northern side, through which the structure was towed. Some coral reef outcrops had to be cropped to allow the hotel to pass through. The structure was fixed to the ocean floor, though the exact system used differs depending on the source, variously being described as a single-point mooring system, anchors to two ends of the ocean floor, or six or seven huge anchors, positioned in a way as to not damage the coral reef.

== Environmental impact ==
The floating hotel was specifically designed for "total environmental safety". Numerous efforts were taken during design and construction to minimise the environmental impact in the John Brewer Reef. No sewage was dumped and the hotel's water was recirculated. The only liquid waste that entered the reef was a brine plume from the hotel's desalination plant. Solid waste was incinerated and treated wastewater was taken to the mainland or taken away and dumped in a legally designated part of the sea. The gas produced through incineration of waste was emitted from a 24-metre (78 ft) high stack, which had been designed to not have an impact on the ecology or aesthetics of the John Brewer Reef. No toxic paint was used on the hotel's hull. While the hotel was in operation in the John Brewer Reef, marine researchers and students from University of Queensland and James Cook University were able to monitor and study its environmental impact directly from the on-board research lab.

Although the floating hotel proved to be economically unviable, various analyses conducted in the John Brewer Reef during and after its operation demonstrated that its environmental impact had been successfully minimised. In a 1995 retrospective analysis, researchers Peter Saenger and Ian Dutton chiefly attributed this success to the designers having respected environmental management requirements, as well as to the comprehensive regulatory frameworks of the Great Barrier Reef.

== History ==
=== Australia (1988) ===
The Four Seasons Barrier Reef Resort, also called the John Brewer Floating Hotel, officially opened as a five-star hotel on 9 March 1988. It became the world's first floating hotel as well as the first attempt to use coastal ocean space for permanent tourism accommodation. Because of various delays, the hotel opened six months behind schedule. While it operated in the John Brewer Reef, the hotel was reachable through a two-hour catamaran ride or through helicopter.

The main appeal of the floating hotel was to divers, though it offered visitors various activities. These included coral-viewing in Tarca's Yellow Submarine, tennis on the floating tennis court, swimming in the swimming pool or in the sea, gymnastics in the gym, game or sport fishing, nightclub entertainment, scuba diving and snorkeling, windsurfing, sailboating, and paddle boating. The hotel was also able to host conferences for up to 200 delegates.

Bad weather impacted hotel guests more than had been anticipated; rough weather meant that the helicopter and catamaran could not leave, which confined guests to the hotel. Shortly before and after opening, a series of incidents also undermined public confidence in the project. In July 1987, Reef Link II, a catamaran designed to carry 400 passengers to the hotel, caught fire off the coast of Magnetic Island. In February 1988, just a week before opening, the hotel was hit by the cyclone "Charlie". Although the main structure remained intact, peripheral structures such as the tennis court and swimming pool suffered damage. Two months after the hotel opened, an unrelated floating platform also installed in the John Brewer Reef, called "Fantasy Island", sank during a storm. In September, a large and previously unknown World War II ammunition dump was found just 5 kilometres (3 miles) from the hotel's location, though it was determined to not pose any danger.

In July 1988, Barrier Reef Holdings announced a $7.89 million loss for the 87/88 fiscal year. In September, the floating hotel was put up for sale on the international market. After mere months, the hotel was then closed down without once having reached full occupancy.

=== Vietnam (1989–1996) ===
In April 1989, the floating hotel was sold to the Japanese company EIE International, of which Barrier Reef Holdings became a subsidiary. The Australian-based company Southern Pacific Hotels was also engaged to manage the hotel, which was refitted in Singapore. In the late 1980s, Vietnam was beginning to open up to the West and entered into a post-Vietnam War tourism boom. Ho Chi Minh City experienced a flood of foreign visitors, quickly overwhelming the small number of aged hotels present in the city. To exploit this shortage and quickly establish luxury accommodation in the city, EIE International had the floating hotel relocated to Ho Chi Minh City in August 1989. In addition to Southern Pacific Hotels, the Vietnamese Overseas Finance and Trade Corporation (OCFC) was also brought in to help operate the hotel.

The floating hotel was anchored to the Saigon River waterfront along Ton Duc Thang Street and was renamed to the Saigon Floating Hotel. The structure was slightly modified, now housing 201 rooms, a gym, a swimming pool, and a tennis court. Two new bars were also added, the "Down Under Disco" and the "Q Bar". The Saigon Floating Hotel opened in November 1989 as the first five-star hotel and first international class hotel in Ho Chi Minh City. The floating hotel was at the time of opening also the only hotel in the city to offer services such as credit card facilities, a business centre, international booking, and international direct dial phone lines.

Due to its direct access to the mainland, the floating hotel no longer suffered from a remote location or poor weather conditions. It proved commercially successful and its two bars became two of the most popular nightspots in Ho Chi Minh City. Locals colloquially referred to the hotel as "The Floater". Despite charging high prices (US$300 per night), the Saigon Floating Hotel could report consistent occupancy rates of 80–100 % in its first four years of operation. The hotel's success led Southern Pacific Hotels to make plans for further floating hotels in Moscow and Kolkata. Over the course of the 1990s, more hotels were built and renovated in Ho Chi Minh City and the Saigon Floating Hotel eventually began to face major financial problems. On 31 August 1996, the hotel was closed and towed out into the Pacific Ocean.

=== North Korea (2000–2008) ===
In 1998, EIE International sold the Saigon Floating Hotel to the South Korean company Hyundai Asan for around US$18 million. Under Hyundai Asan, the hotel was once more towed to Singapore for repairs and renovations. After this, the hotel was towed to the Mount Kumgang Tourist Region in North Korea. North and South Korea were at the time experiencing a thaw in bilateral relations, leading Hyundai Asan to invest in large-scale tourism projects in the North. The reason for purchasing the floating hotel was reportedly that it was cheaper and easier than initiating a brand new large-scale construction project.

The Saigon Floating Hotel was renamed to the Hotel Haegumgang and opened to tourists in October 2000. Between 2000 and 2008, the hotel was reportedly popular among South Korean tourists.

=== Closure and demolition ===
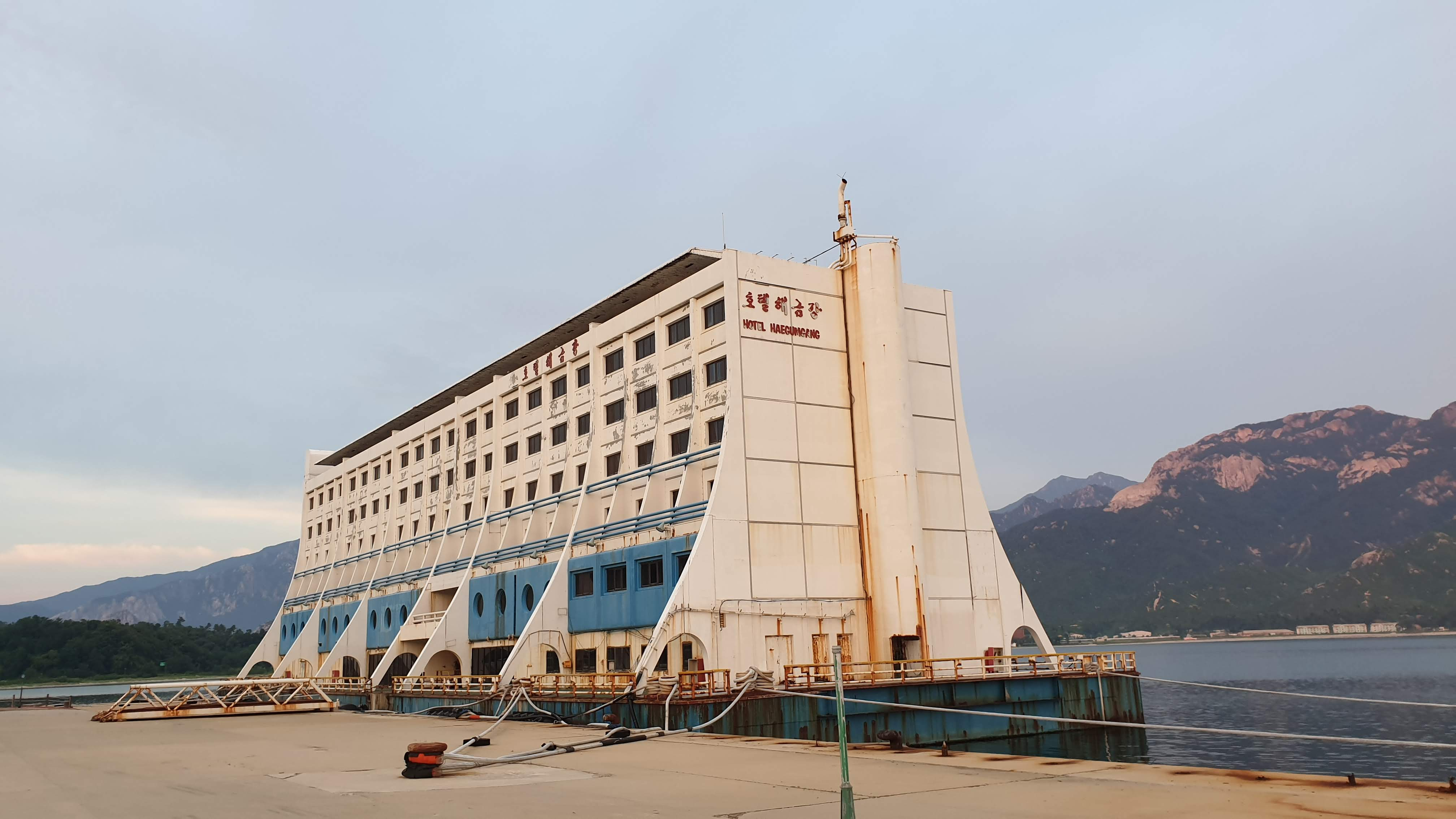
Hotel Haegumgang in 2019

In July 2008, a South Korean woman was shot dead by a North Korean soldier in the Mount Kumgang Tourist Region, reportedly due to entering a military area. As a result of the incident, Hyundai Asan suspended operations in the area, including the Hotel Haegumgang. It is unclear whether the hotel remained in operation after the 2008 incident, but there is speculation that it may have hosted members of the Workers' Party of Korea. The main structure remained intact, though the exterior paint gradually wore off. Hyundai Asan never made any plans to relocate the hotel, hoping that tourism would eventually resume.

In 2019, Mount Kumgang was visited by the North Korean leader Kim Jong Un. Kim criticised many of the facilities in the region, including Hotel Haegumgang, and ordered that many of them be demolished, planning to redesign the area in a North Korean fashion. Numerous involved South Korean parties, including Hyundai Asan and the Ministry of Unification, sought to negotiate with North Korea following Kim's announcement, but requests for meetings were refused.

The North Korean demolition plans were put on hold due to the COVID-19 pandemic in North Korea, yet Hyundai Asan never attempted to relocate the hotel. In early February 2022, satellite imagery began to pick up on activity close to the Haegumgang Hotel and the structure was ultimately dismantled around 5–6 March. As of May 2023, South Korean companies and the Ministry of Unification are planning to sue the North Korean government for illegal use and destruction of property.
