= Shark River Reef =

Artificial reef off New Jersey

Coordinates: 40.07330°N 73.41080°W

Shark River Reef is an artificial reef located in the Atlantic Ocean, 15.6 miles southeast of Manasquan Inlet, off the coast of Ocean County, New Jersey. The site contains almost 4 million cubic yards of dredge rock material. Although 96% of the total reef material is rock, the site also contains numerous subway cars.

It is the deepest of all New Jersey's artificial reefs, having an average bottom depth of approximately 125'. The site is located near Stolt Dagali wreck (rammed and sunk in 1964 by the SS Shalom).

The site contains at least nine vessels, including five tankers.

The Shark River Reef was established as part of the New Jersey's Artificial Reef Program. It is administered by the State of New Jersey's Division of Fish and Wildlife.

== Boundaries ==
Coordinates are as follows:

Location	North	West
Northeast corner	40 07.330	73 41.08
Northwest corner	40 07.330W	73 41.80
Center	40 06.777	73 57.86
Southeast corner	40 06.200	73 41.08
Southwest corner	40 06.200	73 41.80

== Incidents ==
On two occasions, rocks intended for the Shark River Reef were dumped before reaching the site, violating the Marine Protection, Research and Sanctuaries Act (MPRSA), known as the Ocean Dumping Act.

The first incident occurred in December 2003 in rough seas. 3,600 cubic yards of rock shifted position within the barge, causing it to flip over and dump its cargo.

The second incident, also in December, resulted in the deliberate dumping of 3,600 cubic yards of dredged rock material about half of a mile north of the reef. Due to a punctured hull, the barge carrying the rock began to lean rapidly. To avoid possible sinking or flipping of the barge, the captain dumped the rock.

== See also ==
- Marine biology – Scientific study of ocean life
- Cancún Underwater Museum – Underwater display of sculpture in Cancún, Mexico
- Molinere Underwater Sculpture Park – Collection of underwater contemporary art off Grenada in the Caribbean
- Gibraltar Artificial Reef – Collection of sunken wrecks
- Sinking ships for wreck diving sites – Scuttling old ships to produce artificial reefs
- Osborne Reef – Artificial reef off Fort Lauderdale, Florida, US
