= Gibraltar Artificial Reef =

Collection of sunken wrecks

Coordinates: 36.121178°N 5.355542°W

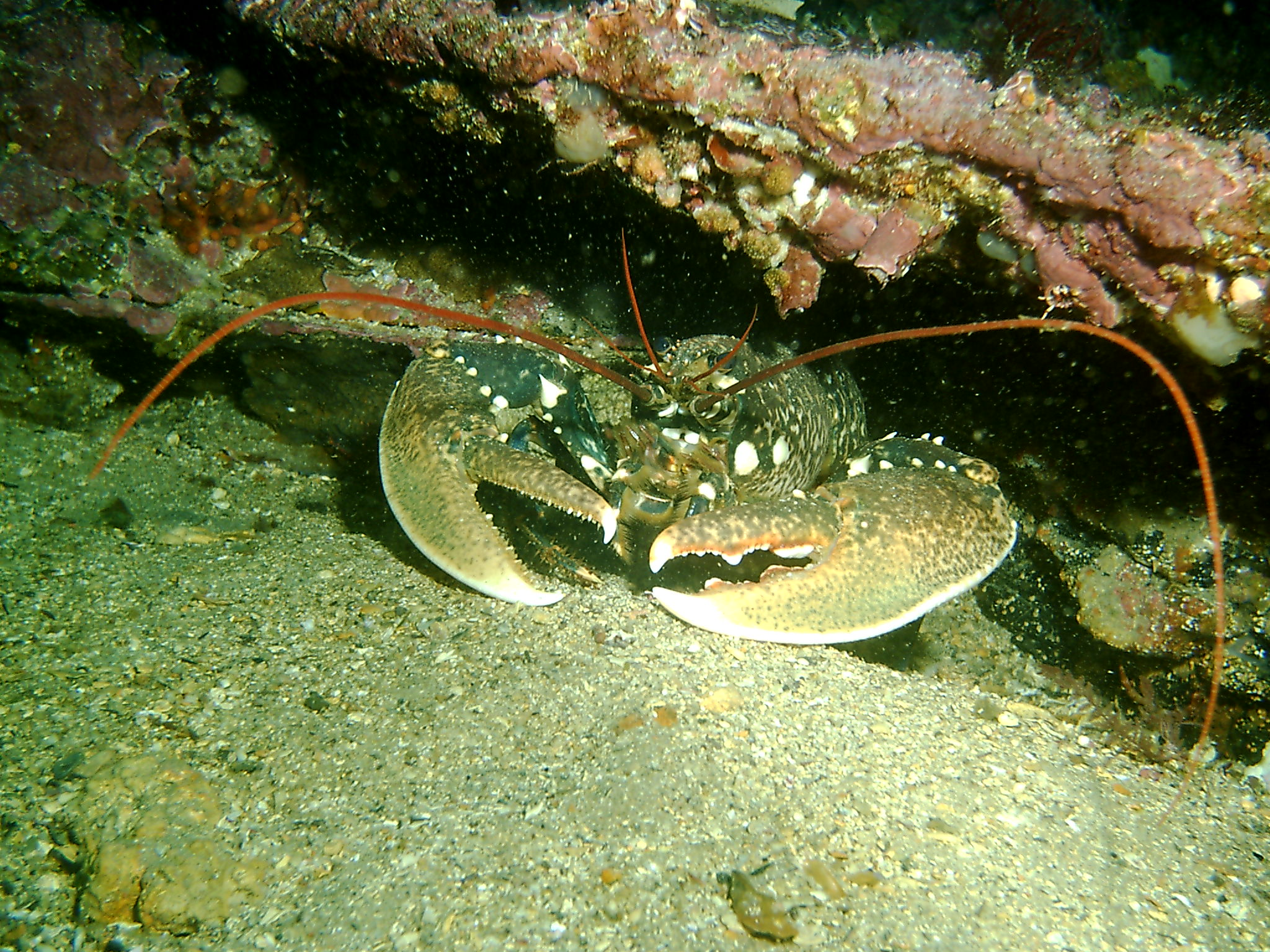
A lobster hiding in one of the sunken ships used to create the reef

The Gibraltar Artificial Reef, or simply the Gibraltar Reef, is the ongoing artificial reef project for the Mediterranean waters surrounding the British overseas territory of Gibraltar. The initiative was started in 1973 by Dr. Eric Shaw of the Helping Hand Trust.

There are more than 40 dive sites to visit in Gibraltar. Biodiversity is claimed to be high on both natural and artificial reefs.

It consists of a collection of sunken wrecks designed to give marine wildlife an environment to breed and colonise.

The reef project has been the centre of political disagreements between Spain and the UK government.

== History ==
Initially experiments were tried with tyres chained together but sand movement and currents proved to be too strong and washed the tyres away or buried them. Benthic stones were used but they also suffered from tidal force and proved too expensive. This was followed by sinking of cars and monitoring the effects of sealife upon them, including a Mercedes-Benz that was towed out behind a boat prior to being sunk, driven by diver and instructor Steven Hensaw.

Finally boats and barges were to be donated by the Gibraltar Port Authority and local marinas. These boats were thoroughly cleaned and emptied of all pollutants prior to sinking and every location mapped. The first boats were two barges donated by Gibunco in 1974 and sunk in Camp Bay.

In 2006 the 65 ton wooden boat True Joy, also known as "Noah's Ark", was sunk here. The last major addition was the remains of the MV New Flame, a mid-sized bulk carrier that foundered off Europa Point in 2007.

In 2013 a new type of reef was created by sinking of concrete blocks, with metal spikes attached. This caused a diplomatic row, as Spain claimed that these blocks were ripping fishing nets used for trawling and began discussions of whether to place a tax on visitors into Gibraltar from Spain, and close Spain's airspace for flights inbound to Gibraltar.

Greenpeace commented that "such reefs are a very common practice. This is a diplomatic conflict over maritime sovereignty and not an environmental one." Spain regularly "deployed hundreds of [concrete blocks] to protect its waters" from fishing trawlers.

== Diving ==
Gibraltar's reef has attracted a large variety of marine life, becoming a major attraction for both local and Spanish recreational divers.

== See also ==
- Marine biology – Scientific study of ocean life
- Cancún Underwater Museum – Underwater display of sculpture in Cancún, Mexico
- Molinere Underwater Sculpture Park – Collection of underwater contemporary art off Grenada in the Caribbean
- Shark River Reef – Artificial reef off New Jersey
- Sinking ships for wreck diving sites – Scuttling old ships to produce artificial reefs
- Osborne Reef – Artificial reef off Fort Lauderdale, Florida, US
