= Mount Kumgang Tourist Region =

Special administrative region of North Korea

Mount Kumgang Tourist Region 금강산국제관광특구
- Former special administrative region of North Korea
- 2002–2024
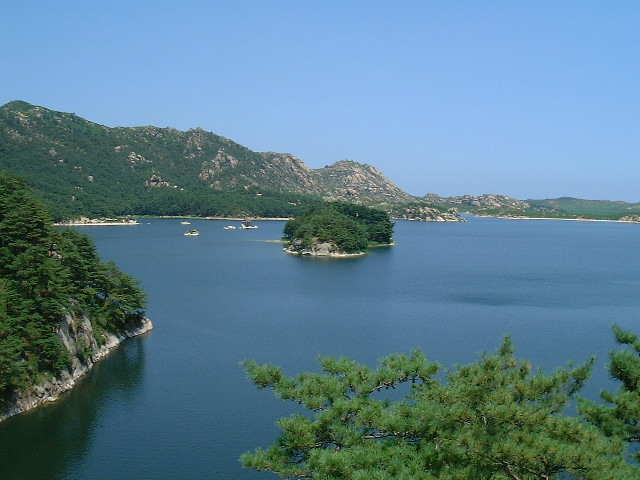

- Area
  - Coordinates: 38°41′17″N 128°12′01″E
- 530 km^{2} (200 sq mi)
  - Type: Tourist Region*
- History
  - Established: 2002
  - Disestablished: 2024
Preceded by	Succeeded by
Kangwon Province, North Korea	Kangwon Province, North Korea
- *Split from Kangwŏn in 2002.

The Mount Kumgang Tourist Region was a special administrative region of North Korea. It was established in 2002 to handle South Korean tourist traffic to Mount Kumgang (Diamond Mountain). It was one of the symbols of the South Korean Sunshine Policy. In January 2024, North Korea announced that they would close the Mount Kumgang International Tourism Administration.

== History ==
=== Development and boom period ===
Beginning in 1998, South Korean and other foreign tourists were allowed to visit Mount Kumgang, traveling at first by cruise ship, and then by bus on a newly built road through the Korean Demilitarized Zone. In 2002, the area around the mountain was separated from Kangwon Province and organized as a separately administered Tourist Region, covering 204.6 square miles (530 km^{2}). From 1998 to July 2008 over one million South Koreans visited the resort, substantially less than the expected 4.9 million visits from 1999 to 2004. The resort was home to Hotel Haegumgang, a floating hotel that first operated on Australia's Great Barrier Reef. Much of the infrastructure in the area was built by the South Korean Hyundai Asan company which received a 30-year exclusive deal to develop the region. In addition to hotels, it was also to include golf courses, ski resorts and other facilities. Developed facilities included Kumgangsan Hotel and Oikumgang Hotel, the former described as the "flagship hotel" for the region. By 2007 the region had reported more than 1.7 million visitors.

=== Winding down and North Korean takeover ===
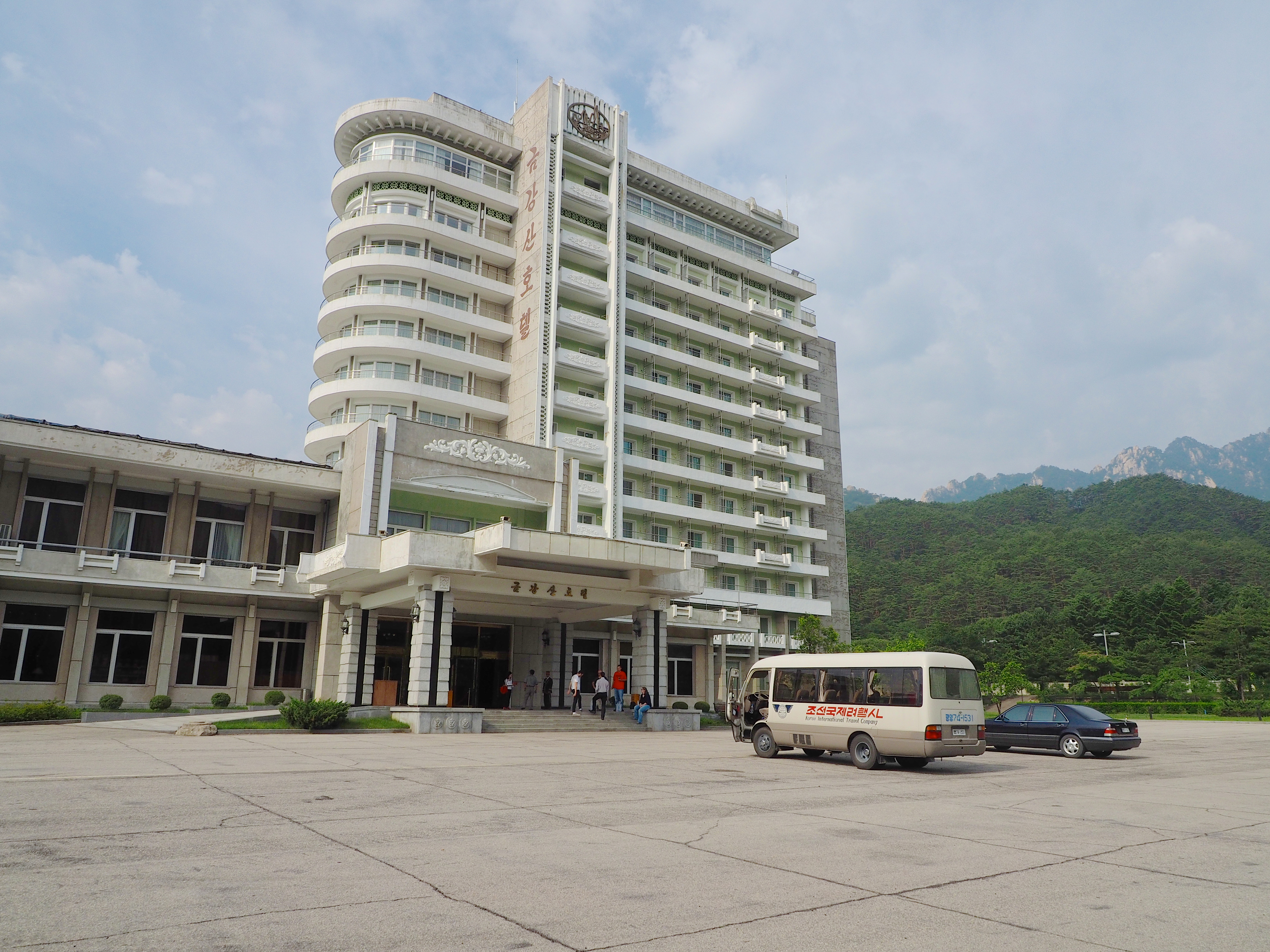
Kumgangsan Hotel at Mt Kumgang

In July 2008, Park Wang-ja, a 53-year-old South Korean tourist, was shot twice and killed when she entered a military area, according to the North Korean government. The South Korean request for a joint inquiry was denied. Forensic tests done on Park suggest that she was standing still or walking slowly when shot. This contradicted the North Korean claim that she was running and did not heed warnings. Immediately after the shooting, the South Korean government suspended tours to the resort. In August 2008 the North Koreans announced that they would expel "unnecessary" South Korean workers from the resort.

In March 2010, the DPRK government warned of "extraordinary measures" if the tourism ban were not lifted. On April 23, 2010, the North Korean government seized five properties owned by South Korea at the resort, saying that it was done "in compensation for the damage the North side suffered due to the suspension of the tour for a long period." In seizing the properties, North Korea also alluded to the Baengnyeong incident, showing displeasure with South Korea blaming North Korea for the sinking of the ship. Hyundai Asan losses from this incident are estimated at hundreds of million of dollars lost from investment, and further losses due to suspension of tourism-generated income.

Starting in April 2010, North Korea permitted companies to run tours from the North Korean side, making it appear increasingly unlikely that tours would be resumed from the South. However, on October 1, 2010, news reports said, "Red Cross officials from the two Koreas agreed Friday to hold reunions for families separated by the Korean War amid mixed signals from North Korea on easing tensions over the sinking of a South Korean warship. One hundred families from each country will attend the meetings from Oct. 30 to Nov. 5 at a hotel and reunion center at the North's scenic Diamond Mountain resort, Unification Ministry spokeswoman Lee Jong-joo said." By September 2011 North Korea had begun operating cruises directly from Rason in north-eastern North Korea, to the port in Mount Kumgang, offering visitors the chance to stay in the resorts previously run by the south. Although aimed primarily at Chinese guests, western companies also offered the tours.

Despite the Lee Myung-bak government expressing a verbal anti-North Korean stance, the head of the government-funded Korea Institute for National Unification, Kim Tae-u, proposed that the South Korean government reopen negotiations on the Mount Kumgang Tourist Region with North Korea without any official apology for North Korea's military actions towards the ROKS Cheonan sinking and the bombardment of Yeonpyeong.

A 2018 travel book described most facilities in the region closed due to lack of visitors. Around the same time, South Korean President Moon Jae-in and North Korea's Kim Jong Un agreed to restart tours to the resort.

In 2019, Kim Jong Un visited the site and criticised the facilities: "They are not only very backward in terms of architecture but look so shabby as they are not properly cared for. The buildings are just a hotchpotch with no national character at all." He also ordered the South Korean facilities to be replaced by "modern facilities". This was criticized by the South Korean government which instead proposed renovating the complex. In January 2020, the North Korean government said that redevelopment of the site was postponed due to the coronavirus pandemic.

As of late 2022 there were reports based on satellite imagery that the resort's facilities, including the golf course and the Hotel Haegumgang floating hotel, were being dismantled pursuant to the directives from leader Kim Jong Un. Other facilities that were destroyed include the Mt. Paektu General Museum and Cultural Center, as well as the apartment buildings at the Diamond Mountain Golf Resort and Spa. No new building was spotted in the area.

On January 15, 2024, it was announced that North Korea would close the Mount Kumgang International Tourism Administration.

== See also ==
- Kaesong Industrial Region
- Mount Kumgang
