= Museum of Underwater Art =

Museum near Townsville, Australia

Coordinates: 19°14′46″S 146°48′36″E

- Established: August 2020
- Location: John Brewer Reef, Queensland, Australia
- Chairperson: Paul Victory
- Website: www.moua.com.au

The Museum of Underwater Art (MOUA) is a series of underwater art installations near Townsville, Australia. It is the only underwater art museum in the Southern Hemisphere and consists of three sculptures created by British sculptor Jason deCaires Taylor. The museum opened in 2020.

== Operation ==
The MOUA is managed by MOUA Ltd. The Chairman of the MOUA Board is Paul Victory and the Deputy Chair is Dr. Adam Smith.

Funding for MOUA has been provided by the Queensland and Australian government and local businesses. MOUA has several permits for facilities and moorings. The annual monitoring plan includes surveys of infrastructure, marine life, social, coral propagation, and marine debris. Reef Ecologic and MOUA initiated a citizen science iNaturalist project of naturalists, citizen scientists, and biologists taking photos and sharing observations of biodiversity of marine species at John Brewer Reef. As of April 2024 participants in this project have recorded 4572 observations of 542 species with the most observed species being the Sixband parrotfish. A scientific paper reported significant increase in fish abundance and diversity, with no changes in invertebrate abundance and diversity.

The MOUA launched an exhibition called Ocean Sentinels above water at Museum of Tropical Queensland in 2022. This includes eight sculptures of scientists, conservationists, and Indigenous people. In May 2023, the Ocean Sentinels were installed as a snorkel trail at John Brewer Reef. Plans for installation at Magnetic Island were scrapped after protests from local concerned with the placement in a marine park green zone.

== Sculptures ==
The MOUA has installed three underwater sculptures:

1. The Ocean Siren on the Strand Townsville created by Jason deCaires Taylor and installed in December 2019 is made from stainless steel, fiberglass and is a 4m high illuminated sculpture. The Ocean Siren was modelled on Takoda Johnson, a young indigenous girl from the Wulgurukaba tribe. It reacts to live water temperature data from the Australian Institute of Marine Science Davies Reef weather station on the Great Barrier Reef and changes color in response to live variations in water temperature.
2. The Coral Greenhouse at John Brewer Reef created by Jason deCaires Taylor and installed in December 2019 is made from stainless steel and concrete and at 12 m × 9 m × 9.3 m (39 ft × 30 ft × 31 ft) and 165 t (162 long tons; 182 short tons) is the world's largest underwater art structure.
3. The Ocean Sentinels is a series of eight sculptures also by Jason deCaires Taylor. They are modelled on marine scientists and conservationists and are a synthesis of human figures and natural marine forms.

The sculptures are expected to be colonized by marine life. The Coral Greenhouse installation is suitable for Open Water Divers and above.

== Recognition ==
In 2022, The Coral Greenhouse was one of the top 20 tourism destinations in Australia.

In 2022, The Coral Greenhouse was awarded silver in The Australian Street Art Awards.
