= Jason deCaires Taylor =

British sculptor and creator of the world's first underwater sculpture park

Jason deCaires Taylor (born 12 August 1974 in Dover), the founder of the underwater museum concept, is a British sculptor and creator of the world's first underwater sculpture park – the Molinere Underwater Sculpture Park – and underwater museum – Cancún Underwater Museum (MUSA). He is best known for installing site-specific underwater sculptures that develop naturally into artificial coral reefs, which local communities and marine life depend on. Taylor integrates his skills as a sculptor, marine conservationist, underwater photographer and scuba diving instructor into each of his projects. By using a fusion of Land Art traditions and subtly integrating aspects of street art, Taylor produces dynamic sculptural works that are installed on the ocean floor to encourage marine life, to promote ocean conservation and to highlight the current climate crisis.

Taylor's works in Grenada have been listed among the Top 25 Wonders of the World by National Geographic. His projects to date include the creation of the Cancún Underwater Museum, Ocean Atlas, The Rising Tide, Museo Atlántico, Nest, Coralarium, Nexus, Museum of Underwater Art (MOUA), Écomusée sous-marin de Cannes, and the Museum of Underwater Sculpture Ayia Napa (MUSAN), Ocean Sentinels, The Coral Carnival, A World Adrift, Ocean Gaia, and The Solomon Siren.

== Early life ==
The only son of an English father and Guyanese mother, Taylor was educated in Kent with further studies at Camberwell College of Arts Institute of London, where he graduated in 1998 with a B.A Honours degree in Sculpture and Ceramics. Scuba diving from the age of 18, he became a fully qualified scuba instructor in 2002.

== Career ==
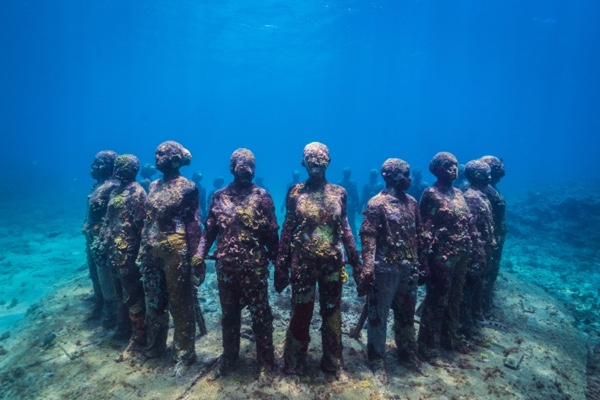
Vicissitudes, Grenada

Taylor's early work includes Vicissitudes, Grace Reef, The Lost Correspondent and The Unstill Life. All of these artworks are located in the world's first public underwater sculpture park in the Caribbean Sea in Molinere Bay, Grenada, West Indies, and situated in a section of coastline that was badly damaged by Hurricane Ivan in 2004.

Taylor's works create haunting, enigmatic underwater scenes, often depicting the mundaneness of life on dry land transported into an alchemic new environment. Instead of the entropic process typically associated with the ocean's corrosive tendencies, Taylor's pieces encourage organisms to grow and affect the surfaces of his creations. They are often commentaries on humanity's relationship with the natural world and the need for conservation, decay and rebirth. The majority of his sculptures are based on living people who are life cast and whose phenotypical qualities alter over time as they slowly evolve from inert concrete to living artificial reefs. Taylor considers that he is "trying to portray how human intervention or interaction with nature can be positive and sustainable, an icon of how we can live in a symbiotic relationship with nature."

In 2009 Taylor relocated his practice to Mexico, where he achieved another milestone: the creation of the world's first underwater museum. The Cancún Underwater Museum (Museo Subacuático de Arte, known as MUSA) holds more than 485 of Taylor's submerged sculptures and 30 land-based pieces. It is located off the coast of Cancún and the Western coast of Isla Mujeres within the Cancún National Marine Park, and occupies an area of over 420 square metres of previously barren seabed. The project was supported and commissioned in 2008 by CONANP, National Commission of Mexican Protected Natural Areas (Comisión Nacional de Áreas Naturales Protegidas) and The Cancún Nautical Association. MUSA was officially opened in November 2010.

Works in the museum include individual installations implanted with live coral cuttings rescued from areas of damaged reef. Hombre en llamas (Man on Fire), cast from a local fisherman, stands towards the current with fragments of implanted fire coral in his head and torso. La Jardinera (The Gardener) is a girl lying on a patio nurturing a variety of potted corals. Other works include El colecionista de los sueños (The Dream Collector), a man archiving messages found inside bottles that have been brought together by the oceans’ currents.

Taylor created La Evolución Silencio (The Silent Evolution), which was added to MUSA in 2011. The artwork consists of more than 400 individual sculptures that immortalised about 90 real-life models from the nearby fishing village of Puerto Morelos to create a community of people, standing in defence of their oceans. The location for this particular installation was chosen to redirect visitors away from nearby natural reefs, providing these with the opportunity to regenerate. MUSA is referenced as one of the largest and most ambitious projects underwater in the world.

While continuing to produce additional pieces for MUSA, Taylor completed a unique creation for illusionist David Copperfield. The Musician, which is a full-scale mermaid seating at a Steinway concert grand piano replica, can be found in Musha Cay, Bahamas. The piano plays soft classical music, similar to the sound of a whale or dolphin, as divers approach.

By the end of 2013, Taylor had placed nearly 700 sculptures around the globe. In 2014 Ocean Atlas was installed in the Bahamas weighing 60 tons and measuring 5 metres in height. Taylor's immense sculpture modelled after a local Bahamian girl, depicts her carrying the weight of the ocean, referencing the ancient Greek myth of Atlas. Ocean Atlas was awarded a Guinness World Record for being the largest single figurative underwater sculpture in the world.

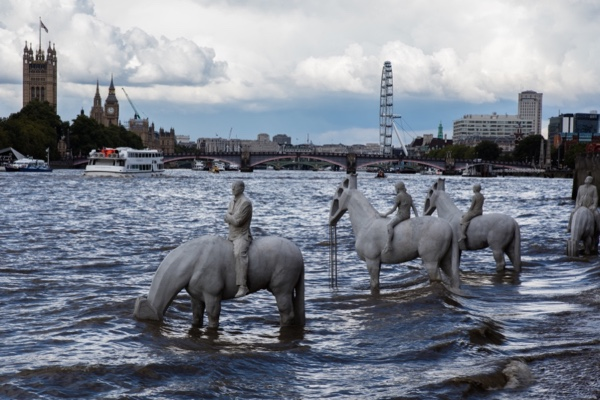
Rising Tide, River Thames, London UK

The Rising Tide was Taylor's first tidal installation in Central London and was part of the 2015 Totally Thames Festival. The series of working horses with riders, loosely based on the Four Horsemen of the Apocalypse, were positioned within sight of the Houses of Parliament. "I quite like the idea that the piece sits in the eye line of the place where many politicians and so many people who are involved in climate change all work and make these damaging deals and policies, yet who are in this state of mad denial," Taylor said. The artwork was intended to provide a metaphor for rising sea levels, demonstrating how little time there is to act to climate change, yet crucially it offers hope as it resets itself each day, offering humankind the opportunity for change.

After relocating to Lanzarote, Spain in 2016, Taylor began work on his second underwater museum, Museo Atlántico, 1,000 ft (300 m) offshore. The museum opened on 10 January 2017 within Lanzarote's UNESCO World Biosphere Reserve and was first underwater museum within Europe and in the Atlantic Ocean. Museo Atlántico contains over 300 of Taylor's sculptures and includes Crossing The Rubicon, which consists of a 4 meters high wall that stretches 30 metre long and 35 life-sized figurative sculptures walking towards it, all unaware that they are heading to a point of no return while they are looking down or at their phones. The wall acts as a reminder that our surrounding oceans, air, climate or wildlife cannot be segregated. The Raft of Lampedusa, a sculpted boat carrying 13 refugees towards an unknown future, is also part of Museo Atlántico. The inspiration for this piece came from Théodore Géricault’s Raft of the Medusa. Amongst the figures life-cast by Taylor for The Raft of Lampedusa was Abdel Kader, a refugee from Laayoune, who made his own journey by boat to Lanzarote when he was 13 years old. Another large artwork found within the museum is The Human Gyre, which was created by placing over 200 life-size human figures into the shape of an oceanic gyre. The piece is aimed to highlight mankind's vulnerability to the ocean's inherent power. Museo Atlántico is accessible to scuba divers and snorkelers who are accompanied by museum guides.

In 2017, Taylor traveled to Indonesia and installed his artwork, Nest, off the cost of Gili Meno. The circle of 48 life-size figures was commissioned by BASK to act as an artificial reef and diving attraction for tourists and the local community. During the same year, Taylor started designing an underwater museum for the Australian Museum of Underwater Art (MOUA) project, which would be installed within the Great Barrier Reef.

In 2018, Taylor went from the tropical climate of Sirru Fen Fushi in the Maldives to the icy fjords in Norway. Commissioned by the Fairmont Maldives Sirru Fen Fushi Resort, Coralarium was the world's first semi-submerged museum. The 6 metre high stainless steel gallery cube weighs over 180 tonnes and was constructed in the UK and assembled on site. The tidal artwork was part of the first coral regeneration project to take place in the Maldives. Following the removal and destruction of the 30 figurative sculptures in September 2018, which was ordered by President Abdulla Yameen, alternative artworks were integrated into the gallery and further sustainable initiatives have since been introduced. The Fairmont Maldives Sirru Fen Fushi Resort has been recognised as a Green Globe certified organisation and continues to work with Taylor.

Later the same year, Taylor completed Nexus for the Sjøholmen Children’s Art Centre in Sandvika, Norway. The aim of the art installation is to encourage exploration of art and nature, especially the diverse marine life found in the surrounding fjords. There are life-sized bronze sculptures of a father and daughter standing hand-in-hand on a floating dock, looking down into the fjord where ten additional figurative sculptures can be seen floating below the water's surface. In December 2019, Taylor completed two significant artwork installations for the Great Barrier Reef. Ocean Siren, a tidal sculpture located at the Strand Jetty in Townsville, was commissioned by MOUA and acts as a warning beacon for climate change. The artwork was modelled on a local 12-year-old indigenous Wulgurukaba girl, Takoda Johnson. Through collaborations with scientists from Reef Ecologic, James Cook University and the Australian Institute of Marine Science (AIMS) Ocean Siren reacts to data captured by the Davies Reef Weather Station and changes colour in response to live variations in water temperature. Taylor's third underwater museum, The Coral Greenhouse located in John Brewer Reef, comprises a 58-ton greenhouse-like structure made from marine grade stainless steel and 20 figurative sculptures placed in and around the building. The Coral Greenhouse is the first underwater museum in Australia and in the Southern Hemisphere.

Artworks, 2010s

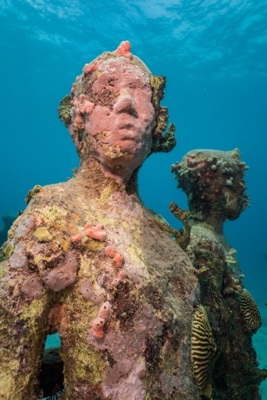
Vicissitudes, Grenada

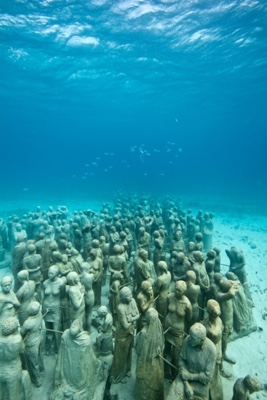
The Silent Evolution at the Cancún Underwater Museum

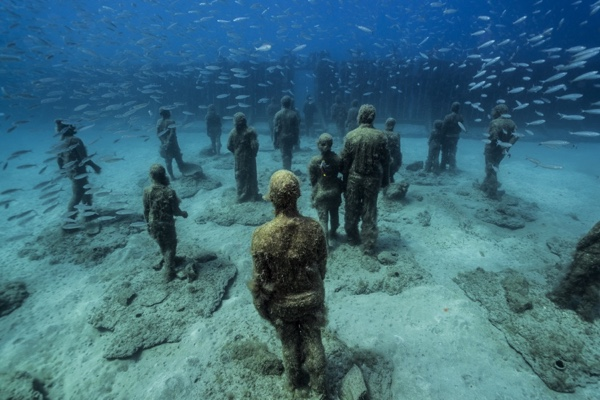
Crossing the Rubicon at Museo Atlántico, Spain

In 2021, Taylor continued to support the eco-art movement and completed two projects based in Europe. The first installation, which is the first underwater museum in the Mediterranean Sea, was the Cannes Underwater Eco-Museum (Écomusée sous-marin) near Île Sainte-Marguerite just off the coast of Cannes, France and has been included in the world's 100 greatest places of 2021 by Time Magazine. Before the museum could be installed, the site had to be cleared of disused marine infrastructure debris and officially cordoned off to protect visitors as well as the six large sculptures and surrounding posidonia sea grass meadows. The artworks are positioned 3 – 4 metres below the water's surface near the shoreline, making the museum easily accessible to snorkelers and free divers. Taylor's split mask design concept not only links to the area's history of being where the Man in the Iron Mask was imprisoned and Cannes hosting the annual Cannes Film Festival, but it is also a metaphor for the ocean – one side of the mask depicts strength and resilience and the other fragility and decay.

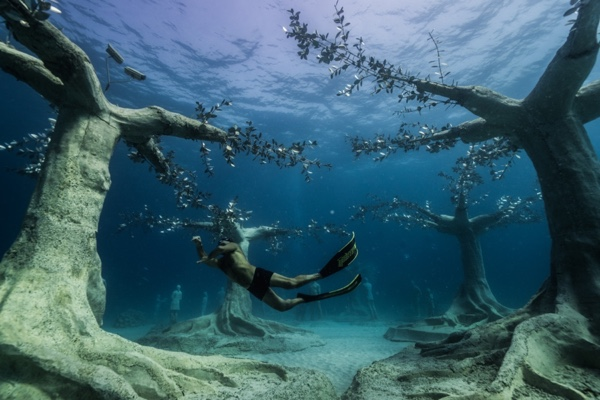
Museum of Underwater Sculpture Ayia Napa, Cyprus

The second artwork installation in 2021 was the Museum of Underwater Sculpture Ayia Napa (MUSAN) situated within a Marine Protected Area (MPA) off the coast of Ayia Napa, Cyprus to aid in the development of biodiversity in the area. The museum is a joint collaboration between the Department of Fisheries and Marine Research, the Ayia Napa municipality and the Ministry of Tourism. As the ambassador for the Ayia Napa MPA, the museum is a space for education, preservation and conservation. MUSAN's metaphorical entrance is marked by two figurative land sculptures – Irineos and Calypso – who are the children pledging to help protect the sea. Once submerged, visitors can view the remaining 93 artworks, which are situated 8 – 10 metres below the water's surface in a ravine of sand located in between natural rock formations.

Eight hybrid sculptures collectively titled The Ocean Sentinels were added to John Brewer Reef in 2023 as the third sculpture installation for Museum of Underwater Art, Australia to increase climate change awareness, support eco-tourism, and provide homage to the marine conservation techniques practiced by the indigenous population.

In 2024, Taylor contributed 27 new sculptures to the expansion of his first major underwater installation, the Molinere Underwater Sculpture Park. The new series, Coral Carnival, was successfully opened in October 2024. Following on from the expansion project, the government of Grenada commissioned a new underwater museum for the coast of Carriacou. The installation, A World Adrift, was delayed by Hurricane Beryl, which caused total devastation to Carriacou and Petite Martinique. In October 2024, the underwater museum was officially installed and opened.

Ocean Gaia was installed by Taylor off the coast of Tokunoshima, Japan in 2025. The 45 ton monumental sculpture spans 5.5 metres in diameter and features a serene large-scale portrait of the renowned Japanese model Kiko Mizuhara. It is the first underwater sculpture ever installed in Japan.

As part of his Siren Series, Taylor created The Solomon Siren in 2026, which was placed on Kale Island, land that has been reclaimed by the ocean as a result of rising sea levels. This tidal artwork highlights current and predicted sea levels on the figurative sculptural element, which is modelled after Gladys Habu Bartlett, a local climate activist.

Artworks, 2020s

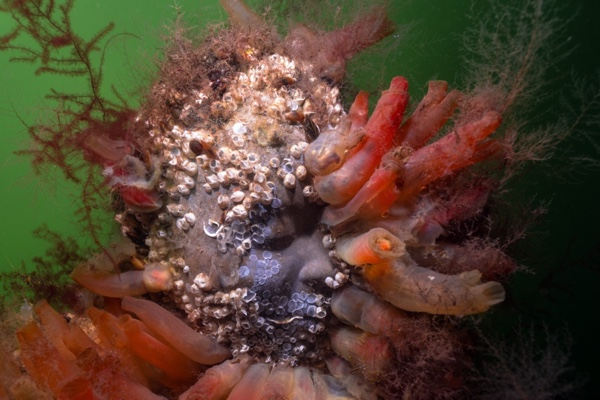
Nexus, Norway

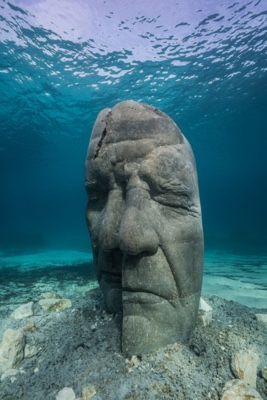
Cannes Underwater Museum, France

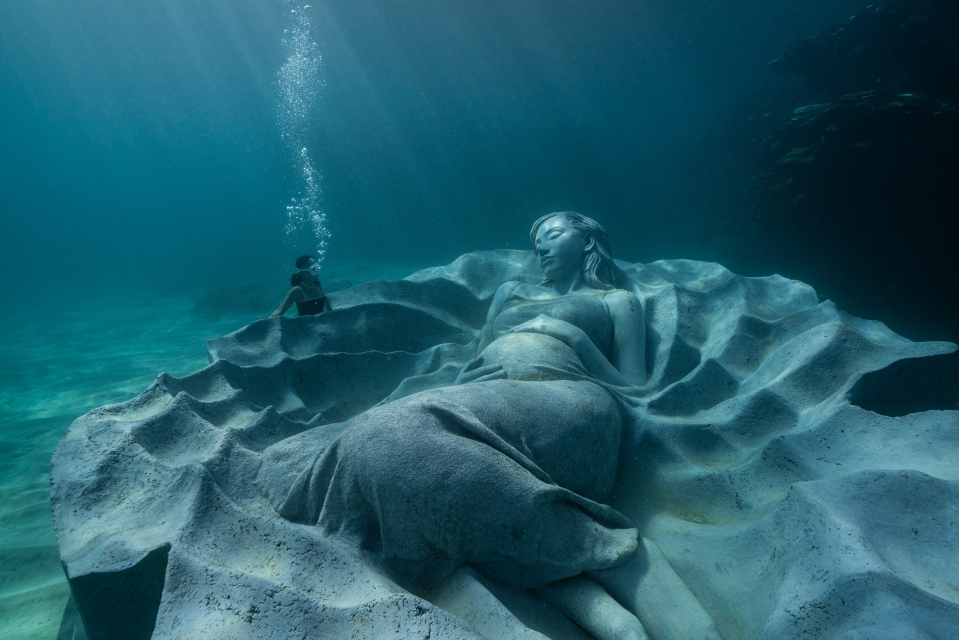
Ocean Gaia, Tokunoshima Japan

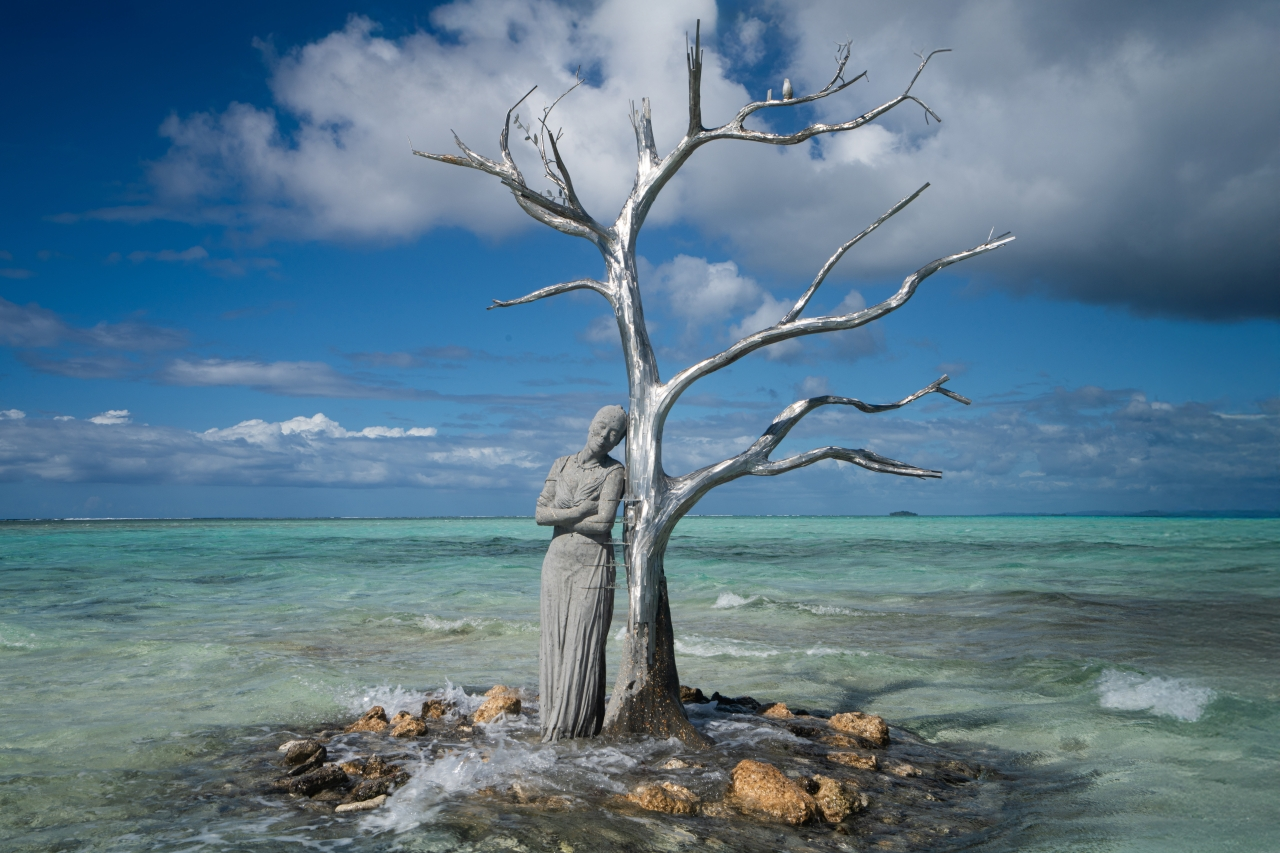
The Solomon Siren, Kale Island, Solomon Islands

== Conservation ==
Taylor integrates contemporary art with the conservation of marine life. These underwater artificial coral reefs installations divert tourists away from natural coral reefs that are already suffering effects from marine pollution, global warming, hurricane damage and overfishing, thus providing the opportunity for the natural reefs’ rehabilitation.

Working alongside marine biologists, Taylor uses resilient, stable and environmentally responsive materials. He integrates a coral promoting neutral pH cement and propagates damaged coral fragments found in the ocean into preset keys in his figures. The structures also incorporate habitat spaces for marine life that will promote an increase in biomass of local ecosystems.

The sculptures are positioned in precise locations on the sea bed to avoid contact from strong currents and tidal patterns and are installed at the correct time for coral spawning to maximize their potential influence to the oceanic ecosystem.

Art writer, Dr David De Russo, writes that "the sculptures are a living evolutionary exhibition as nature colonizes, and the sea and tidal movement deform their appearance developing a platform which will promote the re-generation of marine life. They are a means of conveying hope and environmental awareness."

By encompassing bio-restorative and culturally educational properties Taylors work has been categorised as part of the eco-art movement. In 2010, his work featured in the campaign by Greenpeace for awareness of Global Warming ahead of the 2010 United Nations Climate Conference in Cancún.

In 2016, Taylor produced Plasticide, a land-based artwork that depicts an idyllic family beach scene, which is interrupted by seagulls regurgitating plastic. Originally installed outside the National Theatre on London's Southbank, Greenpeace later used the 2.5 ton sculpture to block Coca-Cola's's UK headquarters in London as a call to action to address their plastic pollution.

In 2024, Taylor created Sirens of Sewage, a tidal artwork that portrays a small cross section of the local Whitstable, UK community - a cold water swimmer, school child, kite surfer, lifeboat volunteer and local fisherman - each who holds a profound connection to the sea and a shared resolve to combat water pollution.

== Controversy ==
Damien Hirst was accused of plagiarism due to the striking similarities between his show entitled Treasures from the Wreck of the Unbelievable exhibited at the May 2017 Vince Biennale and Jason deCaires Taylor's underwater sculptures, which were first installed in 2006, and were also exhibited at the same Biennale.

In September 2018, President Abdulla Yameen of the Maldives ordered the removal and destruction of the 30 figurative sculptures included within Coralarium as the country's religious leaders deemed the human-like figures to represent idols and were therefore a violation of Islamic beliefs. “I was extremely shocked and heartbroken to learn that my sculptures have been destroyed by the Maldivian authorities, despite continued consultations and dialogue,” Taylor announced. “The Coralarium was conceived to connect humans to the environment and a nurturing space for marine life to thrive.”

== Recognition ==
- 2006: Molinere Underwater Sculpture Park named as one of National Geographic's Top 25 Wonders of the World, Grenada.
- 2009: Created the largest collection of underwater sculpture in the world and the first Underwater Museum, Mexico (MUSA).
- 2010: MUSA (Mexico) was voted by Forbes corporation as one of the world's most unusual places to visit.
- 2010: Awarded the Global Aquatekture Visionary Award.
- 2011: Molinere Underwater Sculpture Park was described as one of the "Wonders of the World – Earth's Most Awesome Places" in a 2011 special edition of National Geographic Magazine.
- 2012: Awarded the Guinness World Record for the largest group of life-size statues underwater (The Silent Evolution).
- 2014: Awarded the Foreign Policy Global Thinker award.
- 2014: Presented with the Aquarium of the Pacific's Award Of Excellence for Artistic Achievement & Ocean Conservation.
- 2014: Appointed to the board of the Association of Life Casting International.
- 2014: Published The Underwater Museum (hardback book) with Chronicle Books.
- 2015: Honoured with the “Scroll” of the Friends of the Phillippe Cousteau Anchor Museum (Amigos del Museo de Anclas Philippe Cousteau), an award given annually on the anniversary of the death of Phillippe Cousteau in recognition of his magnificent contribution to the field of underwater art.
- 2015: Featured TED Talk, Mission Blue, Solomon Islands.
- 2015: Shortlisted for the Groucho Club Maverick Award.
- 2015: Became a member of The Royal British Society of Sculptors.
- 2016: Created the first Underwater Museum in Europe and the Atlantic Ocean, Canary Islands, Spain (Museo Atlantico).
- 2016: Received the Lih Pao International Sculpture Biennial Award, Taipei, Taiwan.
- 2019: Received the Order of the Nation from Grenada, West Indies.
- 2020: Listed as one of the 100 Most Creative People in Business by Fast Company, New York.
- 2020: Awarded the Guinness World Record for the largest underwater art structure (The Coral Greenhouse).
- 2021: Created the first Underwater Museum in the Mediterranean Sea, France (Cannes Underwater Eco-Museum).
- 2021: Cannes Underwater Eco-Museum listed as one of The World's 100 Greatest Places of 2021 in Time Magazine.
- 2021: Awarded the Guinness World Record for the tallest underwater figurative sculpture in the world (Ocean Atlas).
- 2021: Awarded the Guinness World Record for the most underwater sculptures in the world.
- 2021: Finalist for the Zumtobel Group Award 2021 - Special Prize for Innovation.
- 2022: Listed as one of the 100 Global Inspirational Leaders of 2022 by Global Leaders Today.
- 2022: Coral Greenhouse was awarded the silver medal in the Best Sculpture Park or Trail category of the Australian Street Art Awards.
- 2022: Coral Greenhouse was nominated for the LCD Berlin Awards 2021 / 2022 New Culture Destinations of the Year.
- 2023: Appointed Ambassador of Cannes representing the categories of art and environment.
- 2023: Awarded the Bertha Artivism Award.
- 2023: Awarded The Virginia A. Groot Foundation Grant.
- 2024: Coral Carnival listed as one of 52 Places to Go in The New York Times.
- 2024: Became a Fellow of The Royal British Society of Sculptors.
- 2025: Shortlisted for The Public Statues and Sculpture Association's 2025 Marsh Award.
- 2025: Scientific article published by MDPI. The Role of Underwater Museums in Fostering Environmental Sustainability.
- 2025: Chairman of the Lih Pao International Sculpture Biennial Award Jury Panel, Taipei, Taiwan.
- 2025: Created Ocean Gaia, the first underwater sculpture in Tokunoshima, Japan.
- 2026: Awarded The Virginia A. Groot Foundation Grant.
- 2026: Created The Solomon Siren, a tidal sculpture Kale Island, Solomon Islands.

== See also ==
- Marine biology
- Molinere Underwater Sculpture Park
- Cancún Underwater Museum
- Museum of Underwater Art
