= Osborne Reef =

Artificial reef off Fort Lauderdale, Florida, US

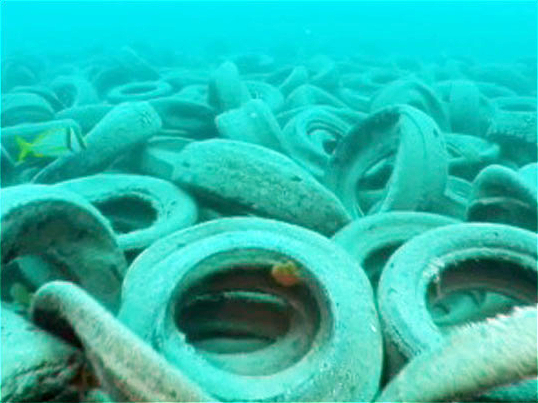
- Underwater photo of the reef tires (2007)
- Type of project: Artificial reef
- Location: Off the coast of Fort Lauderdale, Florida, US

Osborne Reef is an artificial reef off the coast of Fort Lauderdale, Florida at 26.10748°N 80.06493°W. Originally constructed of concrete jacks, it was the subject of an ambitious expansion project utilizing old and discarded tires. The expansion failed, and the reef has come to be considered an environmental disaster—ultimately doing more harm than good in the coastal Florida waters.

In 2007, after several false starts, cleanup efforts began when the United States military took on the project. This cleanup exercise provided the military with a real-world training environment for their diving and recovery personnel, coupled with the benefit of helping the Florida coast without incurring significant costs to the state. In 2015, a civilian corporation took over, and had removed one-third of the tires by November 2019.

== Construction ==
The reef was originally constructed of concrete jacks in a 50-foot (15 m) diameter circle.

=== Expansion ===
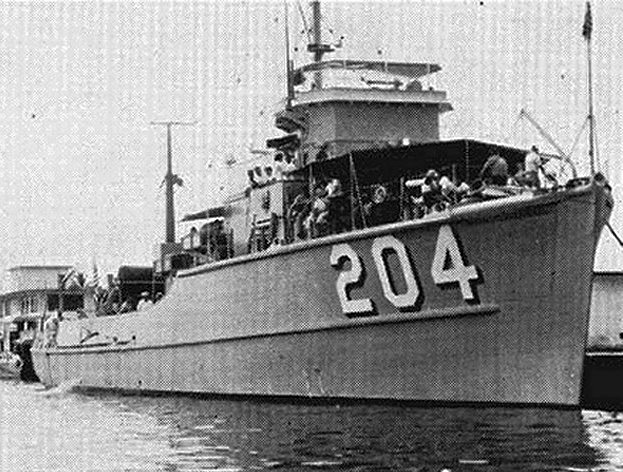
USS Thrush was on hand for the commencement of the reef.

In 1972, Broward Artificial Reef Inc. (BARINC) proposed the construction of an enlarged artificial reef to Broward County as a way to both dispose of old tires and lure more game fish to the area. Similarly designed reefs had already been constructed in the Northeastern United States, the neighboring Gulf of Mexico, Indonesia, Malaysia, Australia, and Africa. Gregory McIntosh, a BARINC employee, lauded the project to the attendees of a 1974 conference on artificial reefs: "Tires, which were an esthetic pollutant ashore, could be recycled, so to speak, to build a fishing reef at sea."

With endorsement of the project by the US Army Corps of Engineers, the Broward County government approved the project in 1974. That spring, more than 100 privately owned boats enthusiastically volunteered to assist with the project; accompanied by the US Navy's USS Thrush, thousands of tire bundles were simultaneously dropped onto the reef. The Goodyear Tire and Rubber Company provided equipment for the auspicious undertaking, even supporting the project so far as to drop a gold-painted tire from a Goodyear Blimp to christen the site. The culmination of the project was the deposit of over two million tires bound with steel clips over 36 acres (15 ha) of the ocean floor, approximately 7,000 feet (2,100 m) offshore, and at a depth of 65 feet (20 m).

== Failure ==
The really good idea was to provide habitat for marine critters so we could double or triple marine life in the area, [...] It just didn't work that way. I look back now and see it was a bad idea.

— Ray McAllister, BARINC founder

Ultimately, little marine life has been successful in latching onto the man-made reef and the majority never had the opportunity to do so. While a few tires were individual loose entities, the majority were bound together with nylon or steel clips (or bands). As there were no exceptional efforts made to ensure the non-corrodibility of the steel restraints, they summarily failed—resulting in the loosing of over two million individual, lightweight tires.

This newfound mobility destroyed any marine life that had thus far grown on the tires, and effectively prevented the growth of any new organisms. Furthermore, the tires were now easily subject to the tropical winds and storms that frequent the east coast of Florida, and continue to collide, at times with tremendous force, with natural coral reefs only 70 feet (21 m) away: compounding their futility with environmentally damaging side-effects. Lastly, the concern of adjacent coastal areas is that the tires are not remaining within the boundaries of Osborne Reef.

This project is not the only one of its nature to fail; Indonesia and Malaysia mounted enormous tire-reef programs in the 1980s and are now seeing the ramifications of the failure of tire reefs, from littered beaches to reef destruction. In 1995, Hurricane Opal managed to spread over 1,000 tires onto the Florida Panhandle, west of Pensacola. In 1998, Hurricane Bonnie deposited thousands of the tires onto North Carolina beaches. Jack Sobel, Ocean Conservancy's director of strategic conservation said in a 2002 interview that "I don't know of any cases where there's been a success with tire reefs." That year, The Ocean Conservancy's International Coastal Cleanup removed 11,956 tires from beaches all over the world.

== Cleanup ==
You get down about 20 feet and it starts to come into sight, it's actually really – it's like the moon or something. It's weird, it doesn't look like anything you could imagine, it's just tires for as far as you can see down there.

— Army Diver Jason Jakovenko

In 2001, Dr. Robin Sherman of Nova Southeastern University was awarded a grant of US$30,000 (equivalent to $54,548 in 2025) by the National Oceanic and Atmospheric Administration (NOAA) to begin a tire removal program. She was able to coordinate the removal of only 1,600 tires from the reef, and at an estimated cost per tire of $17 (equivalent to $30.91 in 2025).

In 2002, Florida and Broward County environmental officials began the long and arduous process of setting into motion a plan to remove the tires. An original estimate of between $40 and $100 million (equivalent to about $72M and $179M in 2025) led the Florida Department of Environmental Protection (DEP) to plan to arrange a deal with those companies whose construction damages the seabed and reefs. Where they would previously mitigate their destructive construction with replacement constructs for reefs, the state would require them to make their amends by removing tires from the Osborne Reef. This plan faced criticism by environmental groups who felt that this would only hasten the destruction of more marine habitats.

=== US military involvement ===
==== 2007 ====
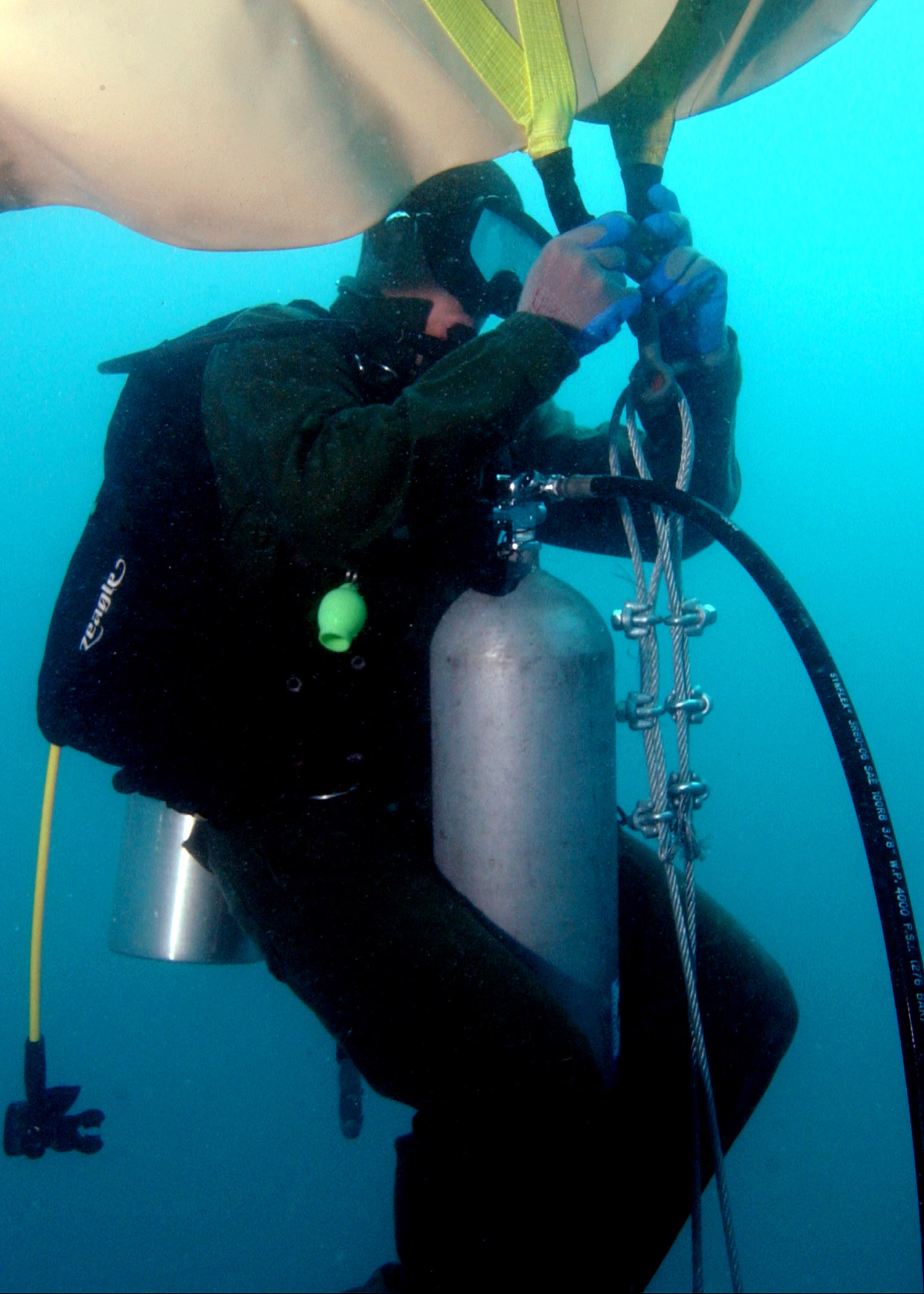
A US Navy diver attached to Mobile Diving Salvage Unit (MDSU) 2 Det. 6 prepares a lift bag to salvage tires off the coast of Fort Lauderdale, Florida.

In 2007, Broward County contacted the United States Assistant Secretary of Defense for Reserve Affairs about their Innovative Readiness Training (IRT) program, which looked for civil-military projects that would improve military readiness and address the needs of the American public. CWO Donovan Motley said that the cleanup of Osborne Reef easily met those requirements: "This project allows these military divers and Army [Landing Craft Utility] crew members' real-world training in 'wartime' salvage ops. And perhaps, more importantly, it exercises interoperability with federal, state and county agencies and these skill sets could have the most significance in the aftermath of a Katrina-type natural disaster."

Coastal America, an office of the United States federal government, was tasked with coordinating the cleanup of the reef; they were instrumental in finalizing the deal wherein the Florida government would allocate $2 million (equivalent to about $3.1M in 2025) to cover transport and recycling of the tires. Ken Banks with the Florida DEP estimated the project to take three to five years, and while that timeline would not allow for the removal of all two million tires, it should mitigate the majority of the damage they were causing to the corals and coastline, though Banks predicted it could take decades for the reefs to rebuild.

Beginning in June 2007, the United States military and Coast Guard began “DiveExEast 07" to ascertain the best and most efficient processes for the cleanup effort. Barring unforeseen operational commitments and engagements, military divers hoped to use this project as a training platform for several years and "recover the maximum number of tires possible from day one." Summer 2007 saw US Navy, Army, and Coast Guard divers based out of a Coast Guard base in Dania Beach, Florida, working to clean the reef. The joint team first worked to remove the tires from where they were doing the most damage, abutting against natural reefs in the area. In 2007, the recovery effort brought approximately 10,000 tires ashore.

==== 2008 ====
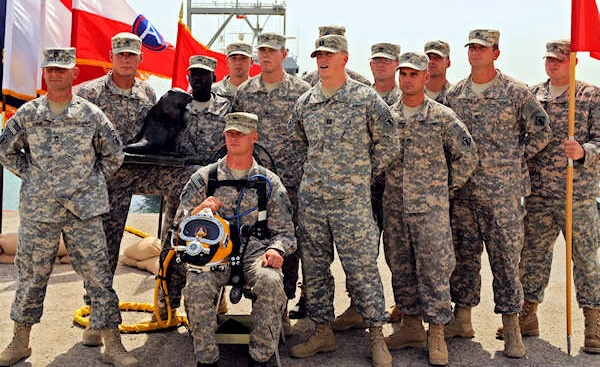
The 86th Engineer Dive Team stands together and answers questions about receiving the Coastal America Partnership Award and their mission in the Middle East.

In 2008, recovery stopped after 26 days on May 24 after retrieving 43,900 tires. That year, Florida spent approximately $140,000 (equivalent to about $209,000 in 2025) on the cleanup, some of which transported the tires to a shredding facility in neighboring Georgia, whereafter they were burnt as fuel at a paper mill. Key members of the 2008 cleanup effort were US Army Captain Russell Destremps and his 86th Engineer Dive Team; on August 10, 2009, they were presented with the 2008 Coastal America Partnership Award and a letter from US President Barack Obama for their participation in the reef cleanup effort. The award recognized "outstanding partnerships that make a significant contribution toward the restoration and protection of our Nation's coastal and marine environment" and was the only environmental award of its kind given by the White House. Two days later in Hollywood, Florida, Coastal America and Principal Deputy Assistant Secretary of Defense for Reserve Affairs David L. McGinnis presented the same award to the partner cleanup team from the Florida Department of Environmental Protection.

I am particularly proud of the many Sailors and Soldiers who have found a way to enhance their training on skills important to our Nation's readiness for war while also making a significant contribution to the health of our living ocean resources, [...] Just as you protect our Nation when serving overseas, at home you have found another way to protect our Nation's wellbeing.

— President Obama in his letter to Captain Destremps

==== 2009 ====
In 2009, recovery began on July 24 with thirty Army and Navy divers at Hugh Taylor Birch State Park, where it was thought about 300,000 tires were caught against a natural reef. Loading the caught tires onto the Army craft Brandy Station, the first day's haul brought approximately 1,400 tires ashore. Wrapping up for the year in mid-August, Coastal America's William Nuckols told the Associated Press that cleanup efforts have thus far recovered approximately 73,000 tires from the reef.

By the time other operations required the military to end their cleanup at Osborne Reef, 72,000 tires had been collected by soldiers, sailors, and coasties.

=== 2015 onward ===
In 2015, the state contracted with Industrial Divers Corporation (IDC) to remove the tires. From 2016 to 2019, the Florida Legislature allocated $4.3 million to the project. As of November 2019, IDC was removing 2000–5000 tires per week, had accumulated a total of 250 thousand so far, and still had two-thirds of the tires to go. By 2021, 4Ocean announced their plan to retrieve Osborne Reef tires in a 34-acre (14 ha) area north of the original drop site. The clean up would be partially funded by the sale of $29.00 bracelets made out of reef tires.

== See also ==
- Gibraltar Artificial Reef – Collection of sunken wrecks
