= List of shipwrecks in 1970 =

The list of shipwrecks in 1970 includes ships that sank, foundered, grounded, or were otherwise lost during 1970.

table of contents
1970
Jan	Feb	Mar	Apr
May	Jun	Jul	Aug
Sep	Oct	Nov	Dec
Unknown date

== January ==
=== 1 January ===
List of shipwrecks: 1 January 1970
Ship	State	Description
Laddy	United States	The boat was lost in Esther Passage (60°53′N 147°56′W) on the south-central coast of Alaska.
Phallus	United States	The vessel was lost in Columbia Bay (60°56′30″N 147°05′30″W) in Prince William Sound on the south-central coast of Alaska after she collided with an iceberg.
Sea Fair	United States	The vessel was wrecked in the Gulf of Alaska on the south end of Montague Island at the entrance to Prince William Sound in Alaska.

=== 5 January ===
List of shipwrecks: 5 January 1970
Ship	State	Description
Badger State	United States	The cargo ship sank in the North Pacific Ocean ten days after she was abandoned after her cargo of bombs and other munitions broke loose and started to explode during a voyage from Bremerton, Washington, to Da Nang, South Vietnam. Fourteen members of her crew of 40 survived.
Cottonwood Creek	United States	The bulk carrier, a converted T2 tanker, ran aground was the coast of Honduras (15°51′N 82°18′W). She was on a voyage from New Orleans, Louisiana, to Saigon, South Vietnam. Salvage was abandoned in February and she was declared a total loss.

=== 6 January ===
List of shipwrecks: 6 January 1970
Ship	State	Description
Sofia Papas	Liberia	The tanker split in two and sank in the Pacific Ocean with the loss of seven crew.

=== 10 January ===
List of shipwrecks: 10 January 1970
Ship	State	Description
Elda	Greece	The refrigerated coaster ran aground near Mehidia, Morocco after developing engine trouble and a leak. She was on a voyage from Ravenna Italy to Kenitra, Morocco. She was declared a total loss.
Pete Tide	United States	The oil rig supply boat capsized and sank in Cook Inlet on the south-central coast of Alaska after colliding with an oil platform on Middle Ground Shoal (60°53′N 151°23′W). Her entire crew of five survived.

=== 18 January ===
List of shipwrecks: 18 January 1970
Ship	State	Description
Fusina	Italy	Sank off Sardinia with the loss of eighteen of her nineteen crew.

=== 21 January ===
List of shipwrecks: 21 January 1970
Ship	State	Description
Garanda	Sweden	The T2 tanker suffered engine failure in the Atlantic Ocean 125 nautical miles (232 km) off Saint John's, Newfoundland, Canada. She was taken in tow by the tug Irving Birch (Canada) but the tow broke. She was taken in tow on 24 January by the tug Zwarte Zee (Netherlands) and towed in to Boston, Massachusetts, United States.
Kolastin	Yugoslavia	The Liberty ship ran aground 35 nautical miles (65 km) south of Tuapse, Soviet Union. Salvage attempts failed and she was abandoned as a total loss.

=== 22 January ===
List of shipwrecks: 22 January 1970
Ship	State	Description
Two unidentified motor torpedo boats	United Arab Republic Navy	War of Attrition: The No. 260-class motor torpedo boats were sunk by Israeli Air Force A-4 Skyhawk aircraft in the Red Sea while sailing to Shadwan Island that was under attack by Israeli commandos.

=== 26 January ===
List of shipwrecks: 26 January 1970
Ship	State	Description
Shiraz	Iran	The cargo ship broke from her mooring and was beached at Dammam, Saudi Arabia. Subsequently refloated. Having been under arrest since May 1966, she was sold in September 1970 and returned to service under the Saudi Arabian flag.

=== 27 January ===
List of shipwrecks: 27 January 1970
Ship	State	Description
Kolasin	Yugoslavia	The Liberty ship ran aground in the Black Sea off Tuapse, Soviet Union, a total loss.

=== 29 January ===
List of shipwrecks: 29 January 1970
Ship	State	Description
USS Nathanael Greene	United States Navy	The James Madison-class submarine ran aground off Charleston, South Carolina.

== February ==
=== 3 February ===
List of shipwrecks: 3 February 1970
Ship	State	Description
Rio Damuji	Cuba	The cargo ship ran aground at Punta Maya, Varadero Peninsula, Cuba (23°06′N 81°23′W). She was on a voyage from "Neuritas" to Havana, Cuba. Salvage was abandoned after gale damage.

=== 4 February ===
List of shipwrecks: 4 February 1970
Ship	State	Description
Arrow	Liberia	The tanker ran aground on Cerberus Rock in Chedabucto Bay, Nova Scotia, Canada and broke in two, resulting in the spill of 3.5 million litres of her cargo of crude oil.
Bat Galim	Israeli Navy	War of Attrition: The landing craft was sunk at dock with mines by Egyptian frogmen at Eilat.
Bat Sheva	Israeli Navy	War of Attrition: The landing craft was sunk with Limpet mines by Egyptian frogmen at Eilat.

=== 6 February ===
List of shipwrecks: 6 February 1970
Ship	State	Description
Lairdsfield	United Kingdom	The coaster capsized and sank off the Tees Estuary with the loss of all ten crew after its cargo was improperly loaded.
Minya	United Arab Republic Navy	War of Attrition: The Bahaire-class minesweeper was sunk by Israeli aircraft in the Gulf of Suez.

=== 7 February ===
List of shipwrecks: 7 February 1970
Ship	State	Description
Antonias Demades	Liberia	The tanker sank in the Pacific Ocean with the loss of twelve crew.

=== 9 February ===
List of shipwrecks: 9 February 1970
Ship	State	Description
Kiska	United States	The crab-fishing vessel burned and sank in a cove in Kovurof Bay (52°05′N 174°56′W) on the coast of Atka Island in the Aleutian Islands. The fishing vessel Kenivan Bay (United States) rescued her crew.

=== 10 February ===
List of shipwrecks: 10 February 1970
Ship	State	Description
California Maru	Japan	The bulk ore carrier sank in the Pacific Ocean. Of her 29 crew, all but five were rescued.
Foudre	French Navy	The decommissioned Casa Grande-class dock landing ship was sunk as a target.

=== 17 February ===
List of shipwrecks: 17 February 1970
Ship	State	Description
Amasya	Turkey	The cargo ship sank in the Atlantic Ocean with the loss of eight of her 33 crew.

=== 19 February ===
List of shipwrecks: 19 February 1970
Ship	State	Description
Intrepid	United States	While towing the barge Cordova (United States), the tug capsized and sank with the loss of three lives in the Gulf of Alaska 60 nautical miles (110 km; 69 mi) south of Yakutat, Alaska, during a gale. Her five survivors were rescued from a life raft 60 hours later by the buoy tender USCGC Clover ( United States Coast Guard).

=== Unknown date ===
List of shipwrecks: Unknown date 1970
Ship	State	Description
Agami	France	The trawler foundered in the Atlantic Ocean with the loss of all nine crew. Officially declared lost on 17 February.
Enos	Panama	The 1,209 GRT cargo ship was taken in tow after cargo shifted, then beached east of Porto Empedocle, Sicily, during a voyage from Cagliari, Italy, to Benghazi, Libya.
LT-1969	United States Army	The tugboat sank in the Qui Nhon area, Vietnam. Salvaged by USS YMLC-5, USS BD 6062 and USS BD 6662 (all United States Navy) between 7 and 17 February.
Manes P	Greece	The cargo ship was driven ashore and sank near St. John's, Newfoundland and Labrador, Canada.

== March ==
=== 2 March ===
List of shipwrecks: 2 March 1970
Ship	State	Description
Saint Georges	France	The cargo ship sprang a leak and was abandoned north east of Crete, Greece (36°29′N 21°54′E). She was on a voyage from Ravenna, Italy to Pazar, Turkey. Saint Georges ran aground near Cape Akrotiri, Greece on 4 March. She broke in two on 10 March and was declared a constructive total loss.

=== 4 March ===
List of shipwrecks: 4 March 1970
Ship	State	Description
Eurydice	French Navy	The Daphné-class submarine suffered an explosion whilst submerged off St Tropez and sank with the loss of all 57 crew.

=== 6 March ===
List of shipwrecks: 6 March 1970
Ship	State	Description
USS Young	United States Navy	The decommissioned Fletcher-class destroyer was sunk as a target in the Atlantic Ocean off the Mid-Atlantic coast of the United States.

=== 9 March ===
List of shipwrecks: 9 March 1970
Ship	State	Description
Vita	United States	The crab fishing vessel caught fire and was abandoned near Seward, Alaska. The United States Coast Guard rescued two crew members from a life raft.

=== 12 March ===
List of shipwrecks: 12 March 1970
Ship	State	Description
Eternity	Panama	The cargo ship capsized and sank off Tan Kan Island, 200 nautical miles (370 km) south of Hong Kong (22°02′N 114°07′E). Twenty-five crew survived. She was on a voyage from Phnom Penh, Cambodia to Hong Kong.

=== 13 March ===
List of shipwrecks: 13 March 1970
Ship	State	Description
Interwave	Netherlands	The coaster ran aground off Great Yarmouth, United Kingdom.

=== 18 March ===
List of shipwrecks: 18 March 1970
Ship	State	Description
HMS Gossamer (1939)	Royal Navy	The M-class minelayer was sunk as a target.

=== 20 March ===
List of shipwrecks: 20 March 1970
Ship	State	Description
USS Cony	United States Navy	The decommissioned Fletcher-class destroyer was sunk as a target off Puerto Rico.

=== 22 March ===
List of shipwrecks: 22 March 1970
Ship	State	Description
HQ-1236	Republic of Vietnam Navy	Vietnam War: The armoured troop carrier struck a mine and sank. Salvage operations by Republic of Vietnam Navy and United States Navy personnel completed on 25 April with the vessel towed to Dong Tam, Vietnam.

=== 27 March ===
List of shipwrecks: 27 March 1970
Ship	State	Description
USS Eaton	United States Navy	The decommissioned Fletcher-class destroyer was sunk as a gunnery target in the Atlantic Ocean 90 nautical miles (167 km) off Norfolk, Virginia.

=== 31 March ===
List of shipwrecks: 31 March 1970
Ship	State	Description
Vassiliki	Cyprus	The Liberty ship ran aground on Mayaguana Island, Bahamas (22°26′N 73°01′W) whilst on a voyage from Augusta to Havana, Cuba. She was declared a constructive total loss.

== April ==
=== 1 April ===
List of shipwrecks: 1 April 1970
Ship	State	Description
Glen Strathallen	United Kingdom	The retired training ship was scuttled in shallow water off Plymouth, England, at 58°18′55″N 4°7′31″W as a training facility for divers. Found to be an obstruction, the wreck was demolished with explosives.
HQ 6527	Republic of Vietnam Navy	Vietnam War: The monitor struck a mine and sank. Salvage operations by the Republic of Vietnam Navy and United States Navy were completed on 15 April.

=== 9 April ===
List of shipwrecks: 9 April 1970
Ship	State	Description
Galletta	Liberia	The Liberty ship was driven ashore at Chalna, East Pakistan. She was later refloated and scrapped at Hong Kong.
London Valour	United Kingdom	The cargo ship was wrecked at Genoa, Italy with the loss of 13 lives.

=== 12 April ===
List of shipwrecks: 12 April 1970
Ship	State	Description
K-8	Soviet Navy	The November-class submarine sank in the Bay of Biscay with the loss of 52 of her 125 crew.
Kalymnos	Greece	The coastal tanker ran aground off Rhodes. She was refloated but declared a constructive total loss and was consequently scrapped.
Sierra Bravia	Spain	The coaster sank after a collision with Ruhr Ore (Liberia) in the English Channel. Four of her thirteen crew were killed.

=== 13 April ===
List of shipwrecks: 13 April 1970
Ship	State	Description
La Jenelle	United States	Anchored outside the harbor at Port Hueneme, California, with a skeleton crew of two and no passengers aboard, the cruise ship was driven aground and wrecked during a storm. Her wreck later was gutted by fire, cut down to water level, and filled with rocks to form part of a breakwater.

=== 19 April ===
List of shipwrecks: 19 April 1970
Ship	State	Description
Enterprise	Canada	The fishing vessel foundered in the Cabot Strait during a storm.

=== 20 April ===
List of shipwrecks: 20 April 1970
Ship	State	Description
Patrick Morris	Canada	The ferry foundered in the Cabot Strait while responding to the mayday call from Enterprise (above).

=== 21 April ===
List of shipwrecks: 21 April 1970
Ship	State	Description
Nitto Maru No, 67	Japan	The 96-ton fishing vessel capsized and sank either approximately 20 nautical miles (37 km; 23 mi) off Unalaska Island in the Aleutian Islands or off the Kamchatka Peninsula (news accounts differ) with the loss of her entire crew of 17.

== May ==
=== 2 May ===
List of shipwrecks: 2 May 1970
Ship	State	Description
Sidney	United States	The motor vessel sank off Orca (60°39′50″N 145°43′00″W), Alaska.

=== 4 May ===
List of shipwrecks: 4 May 1970
Ship	State	Description
Sandra Marie	United States	The motor vessel was destroyed by fire off Cordova, Alaska.

=== 5 May ===
List of shipwrecks: 5 May 1970
Ship	State	Description
T-919	Royal Cambodian Navy	Vietnam War: The LCT-1466-class utility landing craft was sunk by a mine planted by either Khmer Rouge or North Vietnamese commandos.

=== 8 May ===
List of shipwrecks: 8 May 1970
Ship	State	Description
Polycommander	Norway	The tanker ran aground at Vigo, Spain.

=== 10 May ===
List of shipwrecks: 10 May 1970
Ship	State	Description
Plataforma 1	Cuba	The fishing boat was captured and scuttled by a Cuban exile group "Alpha 66"-operated boat. She later was raised, repaired, and returned to service.
Plataforma 4	Cuba	The fishing boat was captured and scuttled by a Cuban exile group "Alpha 66"-operated boat. She later was raised, repaired, and returned to service.

=== 13 May ===
List of shipwrecks: 13 May 1970
Ship	State	Description
Orith	Israel	War of Attrition: The fishing vessel was sunk off the northern Sinai Peninsula by missiles launched from an Egyptian missile boat. Two crewmen were killed and two swam to shore.

=== 14 May ===
List of shipwrecks: 14 May 1970
Ship	State	Description
Lucky	Cyprus	The cargo ship was severely damaged by fire at Rotterdam, South Holland, Netherlands. Consequently scrapped.

=== 15 May ===
List of shipwrecks: 15 May 1970
Ship	State	Description
Bat Galim	Israeli Navy	War of Attrition: The beached landing craft was further damaged by demolition charges placed on the harbor bottom under the ship by Egyptian frogmen at Eilat. She would eventually be refloated, towed to sea and scuttled.

=== 16 May ===
List of shipwrecks: 16 May 1970
Ship	State	Description
El Qaher	United Arab Republic Navy	War of Attrition: The El Fateh-class destroyer was sunk by Israeli Air Force Dassault Mirages at Berenice, Egypt.
Unidentified missile boat	United Arab Republic Navy	War of Attrition: The No. 783-class missile boat was sunk by Israeli Air Force Dassault Mirages at Berenice, Egypt.

=== 29 May ===
List of shipwrecks: 28 May 1970
Ship	State	Description
Efdromos	Greece	The Liberty ship ran aground on the coast of Angola and broke in two.

=== Unknown date ===
List of shipwrecks: Unknown date May 1970
Ship	State	Description
USS Tweedy	United States Navy	The decommissioned John C. Butler-class destroyer escort was sunk as a target off Florida.

== June ==
=== 7 June ===
List of shipwrecks: 7 June 1970
Ship	State	Description
Batissa	Argentina	The Intermediate-type tanker collided with Italmotor (Italy) in the Paraná River and caught fire and was abandoned. She was later refloated and laid up. A proposed sale fell through and she was scrapped in 1977.

=== 9 June ===
List of shipwrecks: 9 June 1970
Ship	State	Description
Thorland	Panama	The tanker suffered a catastrophic explosion in the Indian Ocean 400 miles (640 km) off Mombasa, Kenya in which nine men were killed. She was towed to Mombasa but refused entry and later en route to South Africa the bow half broke away and sank off Mozambique. The stern was beached at Porto Amelia. Declared a constructive total loss she was later acquired by Greek interests and towed to Japan where she was joined to the bow half of Wafra and renamed Achillet.

=== 11 June ===
List of shipwrecks: 11 June 1970
Ship	State	Description
USS Gyatt	United States Navy	The decommissioned Gearing-class guided-missile destroyer was sunk as a target in the Atlantic Ocean off Virginia.

=== 15 June ===
List of shipwrecks: 15 June 1970
Ship	State	Description
Robertina	Panama	The cargo ship sprang a leak in the Atlantic Ocean off Cape Palmas, Liberia. She was beached 2 nautical miles (3.7 km) west of Cape Garraway but declared a constructive total loss. She was on a voyage from Takoradi, Ghana to Leith, Lothian, United Kingdom.

=== 17 June ===
List of shipwrecks: 17 June 1970
Ship	State	Description
USS Waller	United States Navy	The decommissioned Fletcher-class destroyer was sunk as a target off Rhode Island.

=== 18 June ===
List of shipwrecks: 18 June 1970
Ship	State	Description
USS Moray	United States Navy	The decommissioned Balao-class submarine was sunk as a target in the Pacific Ocean off California.

=== 19 June ===
List of shipwrecks: 19 June 1970
Ship	State	Description
A P A 8	United States	The motor vessel sank in "Dry Bay" on the coast of Alaska. The wreck report does not specify in which of many bays of the name the sinking took place.
USS Tunny	United States Navy	The decommissioned Gato-class amphibious transport submarine was sunk as a target.

=== 25 June ===
List of shipwrecks: 25 June 1970
Ship	State	Description
Walker D. Hines	United States	The Liberty ship was scuttled in the Atlantic Ocean (39°36′N 70°00′W) with a cargo of obsolete ammunition.

=== 26 June ===
List of shipwrecks: 26 June 1970
Ship	State	Description
USS Conway	United States Navy	The decommissioned Fletcher-class destroyer was sunk as a target.

== July ==
=== 1 July ===
List of shipwrecks: 1 July 1970
Ship	State	Description
Ancona	Italy	The tanker suffered a rudder failure at Istanbul, Turkey, and crashed into a six-storey building, killing three people.

=== 4 July ===
List of shipwrecks: 4 July 1970
Ship	State	Description
Tampa III	United States	The 72-foot (21.9 m) fishing excursion boat sank with the loss of one life in 50 feet (15 m) of water off Sandy Hook, New Jersey, at 40°28.093′N 073°53.578′W after colliding in fog with the cargo ship Mormacglen (United States).

=== 11 July ===
List of shipwrecks: 11 July 1970
Ship	State	Description
Jabula	United Kingdom	The yacht caught fire and sank off Naples, Italy. All eight people on board were rescued by a Customs Police launch and Urania (Italian Navy).
Trinity	United States	The motor vessel was destroyed by fire in the Gulf of Alaska off Port Williams, Alaska, on the southern tip of Shuyak Island.

=== 12 July ===
List of shipwrecks: 12 July 1970
Ship	State	Description
Marie Guillon	France	The yacht caught fire and exploded off Jersey, Channel Islands killing both crew, Félix Gaillard and Dominic Cirotteau.

=== 14 July ===
List of shipwrecks: 14 July 1970
Ship	State	Description
Eastcliffe Hall	Canada	The cargo ship sank in the Saint Lawrence River near Morrisburg, Ontario, Canada, after striking an underwater abutment near Crysler Shoal. Nine crew members and members of their families were killed.

=== 15 July ===
List of shipwrecks: 15 July 1970
Ship	State	Description
Naknek Diva	United States	The fishing vessel was lost near Homer, Alaska.
Ruth Mae	United States	The motor vessel was destroyed by fire at the fuel dock at Port Protection, Alaska.

=== 20 July ===
List of shipwrecks: 20 July 1970
Ship	State	Description
Fulvia	Norway	The cruise liner sank in the Atlantic Ocean after catching fire the previous day 100 nautical miles (190 km) north of Tenerife, Spain. All 270 crew and 447 passengers were rescued by Ancerville (France).

=== 21 July ===
List of shipwrecks: 21 July 1970
Ship	State	Description
Seatrain Washington	United States	The Type T2 train ferry ran aground at Vung Tau, Vietnam. Salvage operations involved USS Bolster, USS Deliver and USS YLLC-5 (all United States Navy) and she was refloated on 29 July.

=== 25 July ===
List of shipwrecks: 25 July 1970
Ship	State	Description
Tong Wee	Singapore	The cargo ship caught fire at Singapore. Although declared a constructive total loss, she was repaired and returned to service.

=== 30 July ===
List of shipwrecks: 30 July 1970
Ship	State	Description
RVNS Nguyen Van Tru	Republic of Vietnam Navy	Vietnam War: The South Vietnamese LCS(L)-class landing ship was sunk by North Vietnamese 126th Special Naval Commandos.

=== 31 July ===
List of shipwrecks: 31 July 1970
Ship	State	Description
Red Rose	United States	The motor vessel sank in Castle Bay (56°16′N 158°09′W) near Chignik, Alaska.

== August ==
=== 1 August ===
List of shipwrecks: 1 August 1970
Ship	State	Description
Christena	Saint Kitts and Nevis	The overloaded ferry sank in a channel between Saint Kitts and Nevis. There were 91 survivors out of 300.

=== 7 August ===
List of shipwrecks: 7 August 1970
Ship	State	Description
Lois M	United States	The motor vessel was wrecked near Point Couverden (58°11′25″N 135°03′10″W) in Southeast Alaska.

=== 8 August ===
List of shipwrecks: 8 August 1970
Ship	State	Description
USS Segundo	United States Navy	The decommissioned Balao-class submarine was sunk as a torpedo target by either the submarine USS Sailfish or the submarine USS Salmon (both United States Navy) (sources differ).

=== 10 August ===
List of shipwrecks: 10 August 1970
Ship	State	Description
Niagara Belle	United States	The passenger ship ran aground in the Niagara River 3 nautical miles (5.6 km) upstream of the Niagara Falls. All 130 people on board were rescued.

=== 13 August ===
List of shipwrecks: 13 August 1970
Ship	State	Description
Falcon	United States	The seiner sank with the loss of one life just north of Kodiak, Alaska, 1.5 nautical miles (2.8 km; 1.7 mi) northwest of the Hanin Rocks (57°50′05″N 152°18′45″W). There were 11 survivors.
Grizzle N	United States	The motor vessel sank in Kachemak Bay on the south-central coast of Alaska.

=== 14 August ===
List of shipwrecks: 14 August 1970
Ship	State	Description
Larsen Bay No. 2	United States	The barge sank at Perryville, Alaska.

=== 18 August ===
List of shipwrecks: 18 August 1970
Ship	State	Description
LeBaron Russell Briggs	United States	The Liberty ship was scuttled off Cape Kennedy, Florida, as a means of disposing of a load of nerve gas placed aboard her.
Miss Pozzolana	United States	The motor vessel was wrecked in Dry Harbor in Alaska.

=== 19 August ===
List of shipwrecks: 19 August 1970
Ship	State	Description
Judy K	United States	The motor vessel was destroyed by fire at Old Harbor, Alaska.

=== 20 August ===
List of shipwrecks: 20 August 1970
Ship	State	Description
David E. Hughes	United States	The Liberty ship was scuttled in the Atlantic Ocean at 38°52′N 72°24′W as a means of disposing of a cargo of obsolete chemical ammunition.

=== 21 August ===
List of shipwrecks: 21 August 1970
Ship	State	Description
Galétée	French Navy	The Daphné-class submarine collided underwater with her sister ship Maria van Riebeek (South African Navy) off Toulon, killing six crew and injuring four others. She was beached at Cap Cepet.

=== 29 August ===
List of shipwrecks: 29 August 1970
Ship	State	Description
Marietta J	United States	The motor vessel sank in Frederick Sound in the Alexander Archipelago in Southeast Alaska 3 nautical miles (5.6 km; 3.5 mi) west of Cape Strait (56°59′55″N 133°05′30″W).

=== Unknown date ===
List of shipwrecks: Unknown date 1970
Ship	State	Description
Cambria	United States	The tanker ran aground at Bandar Abbas, Iran and suffered extensive bottom damage.
Manhattan	United States	The tanker ran aground off Ras Tanura, Saudi Arabia.
Montserrat	Spain	The Victory ship suffered electrical failure and boiler problems in the Atlantic Ocean 1,200 nautical miles (2,200 km) off Barbados. Her 660 passengers were taken off by the Victory ship Begona. Montserrat was adrift for four days before a tugboat managed to take her in tow. She was taken to Curaçao, Netherlands Antillies for repairs.

== September ==
=== 1 September ===
List of shipwrecks: 1 September 1970
Ship	State	Description
Echo	United States	The motor vessel was destroyed by fire at Ketchikan, Alaska.

=== 3 September ===
List of shipwrecks: 3 September 1970
Ship	State	Description
Hey Daroma	Israel	The refrigerated coaster ran aground in the Gulf of Aqaba 5.4 nautical miles (10 km) off Sharm El Sheikh, Egypt. She was on a voyage from Eilat to Sharm El Sheikh. She was declared a constructive total loss.

=== 4 September ===
List of shipwrecks: 4 September 1970
Ship	State	Description
Cavalier	United States	The 41-gross register ton, 49.6-foot (15.1 m) fishing vessel sank in Cross Sound off Cape Spencer in the Alexander Archipelago in Southeast Alaska.
Hey Daroma	Israel	The passenger/cargo ship was wrecked on a reef in the Gulf of Aqaba (28°05′N 34°27′E), a total loss.

=== 7 September ===
List of shipwrecks: 7 September 1970
Ship	State	Description
Irving Whale	Canada	The barge, owned by J.D. Irving Ltd., sank off the coast of Prince Edward Island in the Gulf of St. Lawrence. It was refloated in 1996, refitted and renamed ATL 2701 in 2001, and renamed again as Atlantic Sea Lion in 2009.
Moonlight	United Kingdom	The coaster foundered 5 nautical miles (9.3 km) north of Chicken Rock, Isle of Man after her cargo shifted. Two of her crew were killed.

=== 16 September ===
List of shipwrecks: 16 September 1970
Ship	State	Description
Free Trader	Cyprus	The cargo ship ran aground in the North Sea 4 nautical miles (7.4 km) off Terschelling, Friesland, Netherlands (53°25′N 5°00′E). Refloated on 18 September. Subsequently towed to Greece and laid up. Scrapped in 1972.

=== 18 September ===
List of shipwrecks: 18 September 1970
Ship	State	Description
Scoter	United States	The motor vessel was destroyed by fire off the southeast end of "Spoon Island" – probably a reference to Spuhn Island (58°20′15″N 134°39′30″W) – in Southeast Alaska.
USS Soley	United States Navy	The decommissioned Allen M. Sumner-class destroyer was sunk as a target in the Atlantic Ocean north of Puerto Rico at 19°30′N 065°38′W.

=== 23 September ===
List of shipwrecks: 23 September 1970
Ship	State	Description
Andre	Belgium	The ship sank in the Waal after collision with Libia (Netherlands). Raised on 7 October, repaired and returned to service.

=== 26 September ===
List of shipwrecks: 26 September 1970
Ship	State	Description
Valiant	United States	The fishing vessel – a purse-seiner – became disabled in Snow Pass near Ketchikan, Alaska, when a malfunctioning engine cooling line caused her engine room to flood. The fishing vessel My Ann took Valiant in tow, but the tow line parted and Valiant sank.

=== 28 September ===
List of shipwrecks: 28 September 1970
Ship	State	Description
Gravatai	Brazil	The T1 tanker was driven ashore and sank at Campo Bom. She was on a voyage from Conoas to Itajai.

=== Unknown date ===
List of shipwrecks: Unknown date 1970
Ship	State	Description
Aquarius	United States	The tanker was abandoned off Muscat, Oman following a collision with a Russian merchant ship.
Bat Galim	Israeli Navy	War of Attrition: The Israeli Navy auxiliary, sunk at dock by Mines at Eilat, Israel by Egyptian frogmen in February, was raised and towed out and scuttled in deep water.

== October ==
=== 1 October ===
List of shipwrecks: 1 October 1970
Ship	State	Description
USS Atlanta	United States Navy	The decommissioned Cleveland-class light cruiser was sunk during an explosives test in the Pacific Ocean off San Clemente Island.

=== 3 October ===
List of shipwrecks: 3 October 1970
Ship	State	Description
RVNS Le Trong Diem	Republic of Vietnam Navy	Vietnam War: The Nguyen Van Tru-class landing craft support ship (a.k.a. Le Trong Dam) was sunk by the North Vietnamese 126th Special Naval Commandos.

=== 9 October ===
List of shipwrecks: 9 October 1970
Ship	State	Description
RVNS Bach Dang II	Republic of Vietnam Navy	Vietnam War: The Ham Tu II-class minesweeper was wrecked on this date. Ship was stripped and destroyed.

=== 10 October ===
List of shipwrecks: 10 October 1970
Ship	State	Description
Aguja	Cuba	The fishing boat was sunk by a Cuban exile-operated speedboat.
Plataforma 4	Cuba	The fishing boat was sunk by a Cuban exile-operated speedboat.

=== 17 October ===
List of shipwrecks: 17 October 1970
Ship	State	Description
Osprey	United States	The motor vessel sank in Bluefox Bay (58°26′N 152°41′W) on the coast of Afognak Island in the Kodiak Archipelago.

=== 20 October ===
List of shipwrecks: 20 October 1970
Ship	State	Description
Västanvind	Sweden	The coaster was in collision with a whale and sank of the Canary Islands, Spain. All four crew rescued.

=== 22 October ===
List of shipwrecks: 22 October 1970
Ship	State	Description
Glenberg	United Kingdom	The cargo ship was damaged by fire at the Royal Victoria Dock, London.

=== 23 October ===
List of shipwrecks: 23 October 1970
Ship	State	Description
Pacific Glory	Liberia	The tanker collided with Allegro (Liberia) off the Isle of Wight, United Kingdom and was set on fire. She was beached on a sandbank off the Isle of Wight.

=== 26 October ===
List of shipwrecks: 26 October 1970
Ship	State	Description
Sea Mill	United States	The 50-foot (15 m) crab-fishing vessel sank in the Gulf of Alaska near Spruce Island in the Kodiak Archipelago after reporting that her radar and depth finder had failed, leaving her two-man crew uncertain of her position during a gale with 30-foot (9.1 m) seas and 60 mph (97 km/h) winds. Debris from Sea Mill later was spotted at sea, but the bodies of the two men on board were never found.

=== 28 October ===
List of shipwrecks: 29 October 1970
Ship	State	Description
C.711	United Kingdom	The VIC-type lighter was driven ashore at Bideford, Devon. She was on a voyage from Goole, Yorkshire to Appledore, Devon. She was refloated on 31 October and put back to Hull, Yorkshire.

=== 29 October ===
List of shipwrecks: 29 October 1970
Ship	State	Description
Souris Trader	Canada	The coaster sank in the Gulf of St Lawrence following a fire.

=== 31 October ===
List of shipwrecks: 31 October 1970
Ship	State	Description
"Stephil"	United Kingdom	The 73-foot (22 m) fishing vessel stranded on Walney Island in Morecambe Bay after her steering failed and she fowled her nets in rough weather. Her crew transferred by raft to "Craigmillar" (United Kingdom) before she went ashore. On 3 November, 1970 in near hurricane conditions she washed off the island and sank. In September, 1972 she was lifted by a lift rig and taken to Barrow where she was condemned and sold for scrap.

== November ==
=== 6 November ===
List of shipwrecks: 6 November 1970
Ship	State	Description
Marlena	Liberia	The tanker ran aground off Syracuse, Sicily, Italy, and caught fire. All 36 crew rescued and the fire was extinguished. The ship was refloated a week later.

=== 17 November ===
List of shipwrecks: 17 November 1970
Ship	State	Description
USS Ericsson	United States Navy	The decommissioned Gleaves-class destroyer was sunk as a target.

=== 19 November ===
List of shipwrecks: 19 November 1970
Ship	State	Description
USS John W. Weeks	United States Navy	The decommissioned Allen M. Sumner-class destroyer was sunk as a target in the Atlantic Ocean off the coast of Virginia at 37°10′54″N 073°45′36″W.
Marites	Philippines	Typhoon Patsy: The heavy lift ship was driven aground in Manila Bay. She was refloated on 29 November and consequently scrapped.

=== 20 November ===
List of shipwrecks: 20 November 1970
Ship	State	Description
Julep	Panama	Typhoon Patsy: The Victory ship sank between the Philippines and Taiwan (17°30′N 119°10′E). She was on a voyage from Coondapoor, India to a Japanese port.

=== 21 November ===
List of shipwrecks: 21 November 1970
Ship	State	Description
C-176	Vietnam People's Navy	Vietnam War: The blockade runner was beached and scuttled by burning when intercepted by enemy vessels.

=== 22 November ===
List of shipwrecks: 22 November 1970
Ship	State	Description
Four unidentified motor torpedo boats	Guinea-Bissau PAIGC	Guinea-Bissau War of Independence: Raid on Conakry: The Project 183-class motor torpedo boats were destroyed by Portuguese forces.
Three unidentified missile boats	Guinea-Bissau Navy	Guinea-Bissau War of Independence: Raid on Conakry: Three Project 183R missile boats were destroyed by Portuguese forces.

=== 28 November ===
List of shipwrecks: 28 November 1970
Ship	State	Description
San	United States	A storm destroyed the motor vessel in Uganik Bay (57°50′N 153°32′W) on the coast of Kodiak Island in Alaska.

=== Unknown date ===
List of shipwrecks: Unknown date 1970
Ship	State	Description
Erkowit	Sudan	The cargo ship was run aground at A Coruña, Spain, following a collision with Dortmund (West Germany).

== December ==
=== 2 December ===
List of shipwrecks: 2 December 1970
Ship	State	Description
Andrea	United States	After radioing that her compass was broken, her steering gear was malfunctioning, and that she was experiencing icing, and later that she was going ashore on a beach, the 27-foot (8.2 m) gillnet fishing vessel disappeared in Stephens Passage in the Alexander Archipelago in Southeast Alaska. The bodies of the eight people on board – a married couple, their 17-, 12-, 9-, and 8-year-old and 6 1/2-month old sons, and an 8-year-old boy who was a friend of the family – were never found.

=== 3 December ===
List of shipwrecks: 3 December 1970
Ship	State	Description
USS Bluegill	United States Navy	The decommissioned Gato-class submarine was scuttled in the Pacific Ocean about 2 kilometres (1.2 mi; 1.1 nmi) off Lahaina, Maui, Hawaii, to serve as an underwater rescue training vessel. She was raised in November 1983 and sunk again that month in deep water as a means of disposal.

=== 6 December ===
List of shipwrecks: 6 December 1970
Ship	State	Description
Siang-Yung	Taiwan	The Victory ship collided with the bank and sank in the Panama Canal. She was refloated on 29 October 1972 and towed in to Balboa, Panama. Subsequently scuttled.

=== 17 December ===
List of shipwrecks: 25 December 1970
Ship	State	Description
Fecondo	Lebanon	The cargo ship ran aground near Bizerta, Tunisia. She was on a voyage from a port in Sicily, Italy to a port in Algeria. She was refloated on 20 December but was declared a constructive total loss and was consequently scrapped.

=== 25 December ===
List of shipwrecks: 25 December 1970
Ship	State	Description
Rustler	United States	The 24-gross register ton, 43.2-foot (13.2 m) fishing vessel lost control of her rudder, ran onto rocks at Kodiak, Alaska, and was pounded to pieces by the surf. The United States Coast Guard rescued all 10 people aboard.

=== 28 December ===
List of shipwrecks: 28 December 1970
Ship	State	Description
Chryssi	Panama	The tanker broke in two in the Atlantic Ocean 250 nautical miles (460 km) south west of Bermuda. She was on a voyage from El Palito, Venezuela to Salem, Massachusetts, United States. Seventeen of her 38 crew were rescued by Ross Mount (Norway). The stern section was reported to have sunk.
Ragny	Finland	The tanker broke in two in the Atlantic Ocean 600 nautical miles (1,100 km) east of Cape May, Virginia, United States. She was on a voyage from Freeport, Bahamas to Trondheim, Norway. Thirty-one of her 37 crew were rescued by USCGC Escanaba (United States Coast Guard).

=== Unknown date ===
List of shipwrecks: Unknown date in December 1970
Ship	State	Description
Khalda	Panama	The cargo ship ran aground in the Gulf of Suez. She was refloated on 1 January 1971.

== Unknown date ==
List of shipwrecks: Unknown date 1970
Ship	State	Description
Cordova	United States	After her towing vessel – the tug Intrepid (United States) – capsized and sank in the Gulf of Alaska 60 nautical miles (110 km; 69 mi) south of Yakutat, Alaska, on 19 February during a gale, the 400-foot (121.9 m) barge, with 40 railroad cars aboard, washed ashore on the south-central coast of Alaska near Yakutat at the Dangerous River (59.3467°N 139.3064°W). She later was salvaged.
Ridgetown	Canada	The bulk carrier was scuttled as a temporary breakwater at Nanticoke, Ontario sometime in the summer of 1970. Refloated later, date unknown.
YTL-17	United States	The tug was sunk as an artificial reef in the Atlantic Ocean off Wrightsville Beach, North Carolina, at approximately 34°02′N 077°52′W.
Z B 100F	United States	The barge sank in Bristol Bay off the coast of Alaska while under tow by the tugs Mr. Chuck and Arapahoe Scout (both United States).
