= Peter Dal =

Peter Dal was the name of two ships operated by the Dalhousie Steam and Motorshipping Company.

- SS Peter Dal
- TSS Peter Dal II
