= Chesapeake 1000 =

Heavy lift crane ship built in 1972

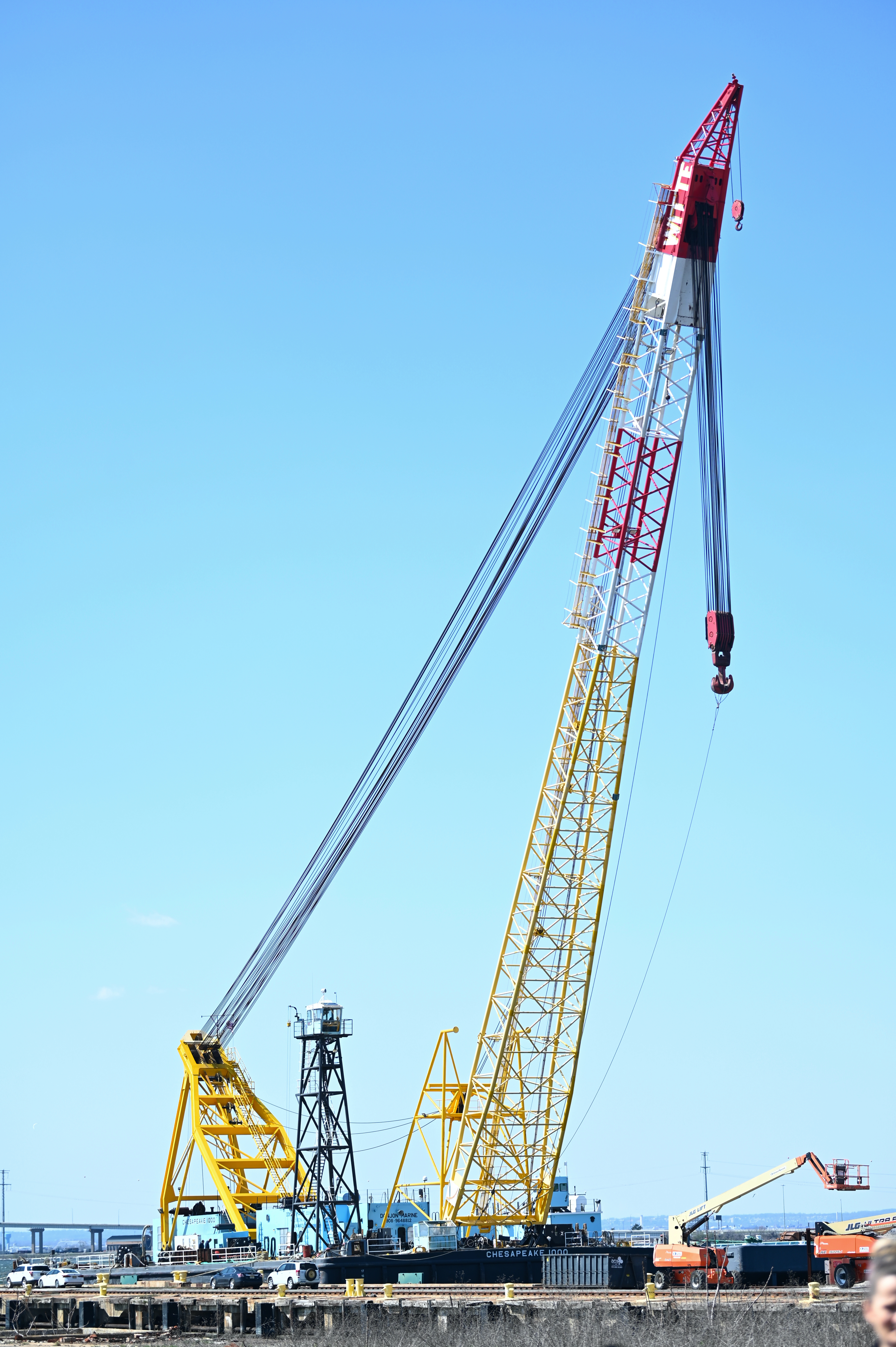
- Chesapeake 1000 in Baltimore in March 2024

History
- Name: Sun 800
- Owner: Sun Shipbuilding
- Builder: Kelso Marine
- Completed: 1972
- Identification: IMO number: 8639314

History
- Name: Chesapeake 1000
- Owner: Donjon Marine
- Acquired: 1993
- Nickname(s): Chessy

General characteristics
- Length: 191 ft 2 in (58.3 m)
- Beam: 101 ft 2 in (30.8 m)
- Draft: 20 ft 1 in (6.1 m)

Chesapeake 1000 (formerly Sun 800) is a heavy lift sheerleg crane ship, owned by Donjon Marine Co., capable of lifting 1,000 short tons (890 long tons; 910 t). It is one of the largest boomable stiff-leg-derrick barges on the eastern seaboard of the United States. (Note: Left Coast Lifter, which was tied up at Staten Island until 2025, can lift nearly double the capacity; it was constructed for the eastern span replacement of the San Francisco–Oakland Bay Bridge and subsequently was moved to the east coast to work on the replacement Tappan Zee Bridge.)

The barge measures 191 feet (58 m) long, with a beam of 101 feet (31 m); its draft is 20 feet (6.1 m).

Since late March 2024, it has been involved in salvage efforts at Baltimore, following the Francis Scott Key Bridge collapse.

== History ==
The crane barge was built by Kelso Marine in Galveston, Texas for Sun Shipbuilding in 1972 at a cost of nearly $5 million. At the time, it was the largest crane ship in the world. The crane was initially able to lift 800 short tons (710 long tons; 730 t), and so was named Sun 800.

In 1982, Sun's parent, the Sun Oil Company, sold Sun Shipbuilding to Ed Paden, who renamed the business to Pennsylvania Shipbuilding (Penn Ship); yard assets were renamed similarly, and the crane was renamed Penn 800. While en-route to Puerto Rico in the mid-1980s, the derrick barge was caught in a hurricane and the original boom was lost; it was replaced with a boom measuring 256 ft (78 m) long (heel to jib) and the main fall block was upgraded to a 35-ton unit, which increased the lifting capacity to 1,000 short tons (910 t) and the vessel was renamed Penn 1000. Tim Colton, who was the Vice President of Marketing for Penn Ship, stated the engineers originally had designed the crane to be upgraded to 1000 tons; however, after the upgrade, it sat idle most of the time, so the crane was moved to the busier Port of Norfolk, Virginia and renamed Chesapeake 1000.

In 1989, the United States Navy acquired a preferred mortgage on the floating crane as a performance guarantee for a contract to build five oil tankers, which had been awarded in 1984. After Penn Ship was unable to complete the contract, the crane barge was sold to Maritime Capital Corp, which subsequently sold it to Donjon, but the transfer was complicated by the pre-existing Navy encumbrance. The Navy released Penn Ship from its obligations in 1992, and it was renamed to its current name, Chesapeake 1000, after the acquisition was completed by Donjon Marine in 1993.

=== Operations ===
Sun 800 was built for heavy lifts, specifically the gimbal platforms and bearings, during the construction of Glomar Explorer, which was the centerpiece of Project Azorian, a CIA project that aimed to recover Soviet submarines during the Cold War. In 1975, Sun 800 was used to recover the 79 ft (24 m) tugboat Saratoga from the Delaware River, which had sunk after being rammed by the ship it was towing. By 1978, the heaviest lift recorded by Sun 800 was a 785-short-ton (712 t) deckhouse. In 1979, it was used to help raise the stricken barge Elizabeth Turner. Sun 800 was used for heavy lifts during the demolition of the central vertical lift spans of the CRRNJ Newark Bay Bridge in 1981, removing 4,500 short tons (4,100 t) of steel in one week.

Under Donjon, which was based in Hillside, Pennsylvania, it removed a derelict steel trestle railroad bridge to Petty Island in 1991. The Chesapeake 1000 participated in the 1996 salvage of the Irving Whale. After relocating its home port to Port Newark, it also has assisted in the 2016 construction of a 960 ft-long (290 m) laboratory building for Rockefeller University, and lifted and landed seven units to create a 485 ft-long (148 m), single-story platform for New York Hospital in 1995. In 2016, Chesapeake 1000 was used to recover the 84 ft (26 m) tug Specialist, which sank in the Hudson River on March 12, killing three.

Following the collapse of the Francis Scott Key Bridge in Baltimore, Chesapeake 1000 and Weeks 533 were dispatched to the Port of Baltimore; they will be used first to clear several sections of the wrecked bridge and establish a temporary shipping channel, then to remove the bridge sections pinning MV Dali, and finally to remove the remaining bridge trusses outside the temporary channel. On March 30, 2024, the first section of the bridge was lifted.

== See also ==
- Weeks 533 (ex-Marine Boss), largest revolving floating crane on the East Coast
