= SS Arrow =

Oil tanker

The SS Arrow was an oil tanker built by Bethlehem Steel Company, Sparrows Point, Baltimore, Maryland, in 1948 as the tanker Olympic Games.

Renamed Sea Robin in 1960 and finally Arrow in 1962, the ship was a Liberian-registered tanker owned by the Sun Navigation Company. At 551.2 feet (168.0 metres) in length and 68.3 feet (20.8 metres) in width, with a draft of 29.9 feet (9.1 metres), she was an enlarged version of the standard American World War II tanker design and one of the oldest tankers in the fleet of Aristotle Onassis.

The Arrow ran aground and spilled its load of oil into Chedabucto Bay on February 4, 1970. This remains the most significant oil spill off Canada’s East Coast, with some 10,000 tonnes (about 25% of the amount spilled by the Exxon Valdez in Alaska in 1989). Only the MV Kurdistan accident has come close, spilling about 6,000 tons of oil after breaking apart in the Cabot Strait on March 15, 1979.

== Accident and loss ==
Arrow took on approximately 16,000 tons (10 million litres) of bunker C oil in Aruba, off the coast of Venezuela, under charter to Imperial Oil Limited, bound for the Stora paper mill in Point Tupper, Nova Scotia. On February 4, 1970, in Chedabucto Bay, off the east coast of Nova Scotia and only 14.6 nautical miles from her destination, she ran hard aground on Cerberus Rock, a well-charted hazard to navigation. The accident occurred mid-morning, halfway between high and low tide, as the tanker was driven by 60-knot southwesterly winds and blinded by a heavy mist. The impact drove the forward section of the tanker onto the rock formation, wedging it with the starboard side hard against the rock pinnacle. Efforts to free her from the rock failed, as did efforts to pump her cargo into salvage vessels. The subsequent inquiry revealed that Arrow's depth sounder had not been operational for two months, her autogyro compass showed a permanent error of three degrees west and her radar had failed about an hour before she ran aground.

The crew was taken off the vessel late in the night on February 4, 1970. After four days of rough seas and weather pounding the vessel against the rock, the deck plates and side plating began to buckle. On February 8, 1970, the tanker split into two sections. Both the stern and bow sections sank in an upright position. About two-thirds of the cargo was spilled. Of the ship's 30 cargo tanks, only 9 tanks remained intact after the vessel sank, all of which were located in the stern section of the tanker. Salvage operations began at the end of February 1970 to pump the remaining oil out of the tanks that remained intact. After deployments consisting of 22 days all together, all remaining oil was removed by April 11, 1970.

== The spill ==
On February 5, 1970, a mile-long oil slick had formed and was heading for Cape Breton Island, the northern side of the bay. Small aircraft attempted to disperse the oil dropping a chemical dispersant known as COREXIT on the spill, but this failed. The oil spread and washed ashore on many beaches in the bay. In a week's span, the oil had spread to occupy 75 miles of beaches and threatened to spread even further. In the end the oil spill claimed 190 miles of shoreline, and environmental degradation remains apparent decades later. The clean-up took months. The pollution caused by the spill crippled the fishing industry in the bay. Fisherman were catching lobsters and fish completely coated in bunker C. The Fisheries Research Board of Canada performed a series of experiments in May 1970 to evaluate aquatic life in the bay. They imposed rules for the commercial fishing business to abide by for the health of humans consuming their products. In total, the cost to the local government of cleaning the spill and the cost of the environmental impact ran to millions of dollars.

== Removal of the remaining bunker C ==
The Curb, a salvage barge from New York, was dispatched to pump the remaining oil out of the cargo tanks. In preparation for the Curb, Royal Canadian Navy divers performed tests with equipment that would be used to penetrate the tanks on the Arrow and attach hose fittings. The main challenge was that the oil had to be heated before it could be pumped out. The Curb was equipped with steam pumps that injected steam into the tanks to heat the bunker C. After the oil was pumped out of the cargo tanks, it was transferred to the Irving Whale, an oil transfer barge. Because of limited capacity on the Irving Whale and intermittent foul-weather conditions, the whole operation was completed in three phases totaling over 22 days. Over 36,924 barrels of bunker C oil was recovered from the sunken vessel over the three deployments. The load was split between the Irving Whale and the smaller Imperial Cornwall. On conclusion of the operation, the barges were towed to Halifax, where the oil was unloaded. The Irving Whale would soon be at the center of another oil spill: on 7 September 1970, she herself sank in the Gulf of St. Lawrence between Prince Edward Island and the Magdalen Islands.

== The wreck ==
At present the wreck still rests alongside Cerberus Rock split into two sections. On August 28, 2015, a Transport Canada aircraft spotted an oil leak in the vicinity of the wreck, and closer inspection revealed a crack in one of Arrow's decks. A temporary patch was installed in October. In November 2015, cleanup crews successfully removed another 30,000 litres of oil from the wreck.

== Location of the wreck ==
45.467049°N 61.104376°W
