= Weeks Marine =

American marine construction company

- Formerly: Weeks Stevedoring Company
- Founded: 1919; 107 years ago
- Founders: Francis Weeks; Richard B. Weeks
- Headquarters: Cranford, New Jersey, United States
- Revenue: $885,000,000 (2021)
- Owner: Kiewit Corporation
- Number of employees: 1,800 (2021)
- Subsidiaries: Healy Tibbetts Builders, Inc (1989) McNally Corp. (2011) North American Aggregates (2016)
- Website: weeksmarine.com

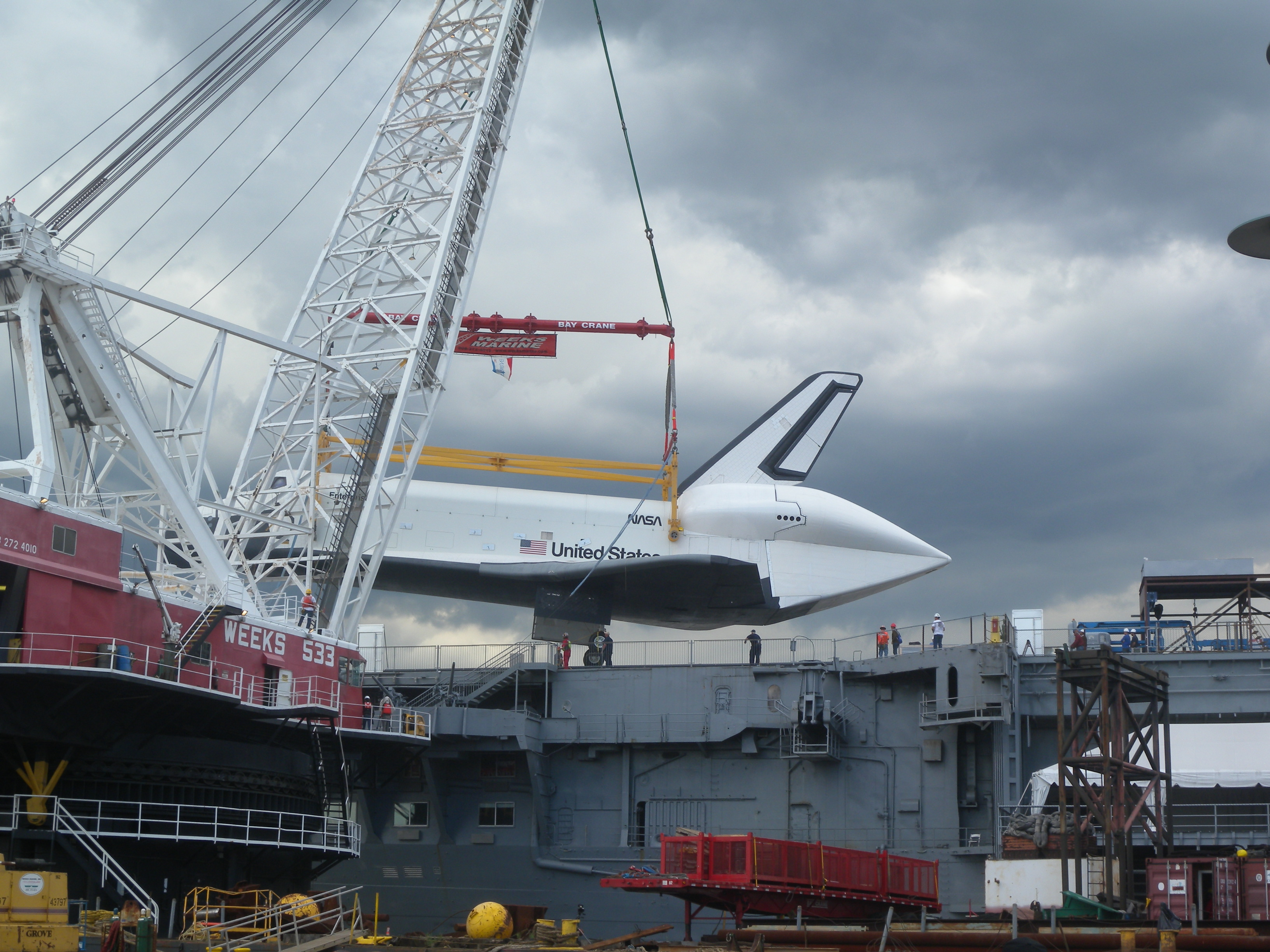
Looking north from Pier 84 as Weeks 533 lets down Enterprise on afterdeck of the Intrepid Museum in June 2012

Weeks Marine is a marine construction and dredging contractor based in Cranford, NJ. It was founded by Francis Weeks and his son Richard B. Weeks in 1919 as the Weeks Stevedoring Company.

== Company ==
Weeks has three key divisions—Construction, Dredging and Marine Services. Weeks also owns three major subsidiaries, Healy Tibbitts Builders, Inc. McNally International, Inc, and North American Aggregates, Inc. Weeks manages a network of regional offices in Louisiana, Texas, Hawaii, Ontario and Nova Scotia. The company currently has 5 yards, 13 tugboats, 18 dredges, 50 cranes and 294 barges. On January 3, 2023, Weeks Marine was acquired by Kiewit Corporation.

== History ==
Established in 1919 by Francis H. and Richard B. Weeks, the company started with two cranes in the Port of New York, handling bunker coal and dry ballast. By the beginning of World War II, they had purchased their seventh crane and were loading military equipment bound for Europe to support the Allied Forces. The workload of the war overseas had taken its toll on the Weeks fleet, so after WWII, the wooden hulls of the cranes were replaced with steel hulls, creating the Weeks #6 and #7.

In the 1950s, the Weeks Stevedoring Company ventured into a number of marine projects outside the field of stevedoring. The company performed salvage and dredging work, installed navigational aids for the United States Coast Guard, and even constructed a breakwater to protect the air shaft leading from the Brooklyn–Battery Tunnel to Governors Island. They also became the prime contractor assigned to remove abandoned wooden vessels for the Army Corps of Engineers, work still contracted today. In 1958, Weeks purchased their first crane to be used exclusively outside the field of stevedoring, the Weeks #500.

In 1960, Weeks brought their first vessels to the fleet as two 120 ft (37 m) by 38 ft (12 m) deck barges were built by Richmond Steel for the company. In 1962, they added their first dump scow, the Weeks #250, a 171 ft (52 m) by 43 ft (13 m) vessel.

Over the next ten years, the Weeks barge fleet had grown proportionally, creating a vital infrastructural core of the Weeks operation today. During the 1970s, the first dredge, the Venture, a 169 ft (52 m) by 41 ft (12 m) 30 in (0.76 m) hydraulic dredge, and the first large tug, the William J. McPhillips, a 105 ft (32 m) 2,400 horsepower single screw tug, were purchased in an effort to broaden the company even further.

In the 1980s and 90s, the Weeks organization grew by acquiring other marine companies. During that time, Weeks substantial acquisitions were M.P. Howlett, a New York based stevedoring company, in 1983, American Dredging Company, one of the most famous dredging companies in history, in 1993, and T.L. James, another dredging company based in Louisiana, in 1998.

Between 2001-2003, and 2008-2010, Weeks Marine was the prime consultant and contractor for the reefing of retired MTA New York City Subway cars from classes R26, R28, R29, R33, and R36 from the IRT's A Division, and classes R32, R38, R40 and R42 from the BMT/IND's B Division, which were retired, stripped and loaded onto barges and taken to designated reef sites in the States of New Jersey, Delaware, Maryland, Virginia, South Carolina, Georgia, and Florida. The cars were reefed into the Atlantic Ocean, thus creating an artificial and diving reefs from same.

Weeks 533, a large 500-short-ton (454 t) rotating barge-crane has been used for several notable heavy lifts, including moving the Concorde and Enterprise onto the Intrepid Sea, Air & Space Museum and lifting the downed hull of US Airways Flight 1549 from the Hudson River.

On January 3, 2023, Weeks Marine was acquired by Kiewit Corporation. It was announced that although now owned by Kiewit, Weeks will still operate under its own name.
