= M-class minelayer =

Class of minelayers in the Royal Navy

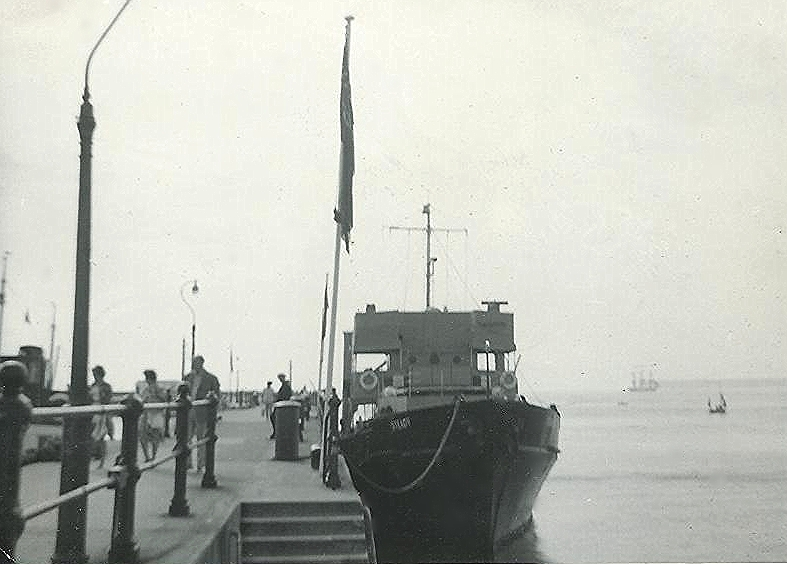
- HMS Steady, former Miner VII

Class overview
- Name: M class
- Operators: Royal Navy
- Preceded by: Linnet class
- Succeeded by: Abdiel class
- Built: 1939–1943
- In commission: 1939–1980
- Planned: 9
- Completed: 8
- Retired: 8

General characteristics
- Type: Controlled minelayer
- Displacement: 364 tons standard
- Length: 110 ft 3 in (33.60 m) (p/p)
- Beam: 26 ft 6 in (8.08 m)
- Draught: 8 ft 0 in (2.44 m)
- Propulsion: Triple expansion engine; 2 shaft; 720 hp (540 kW)
- Speed: 10 knots (19 km/h; 12 mph)
- Complement: 32

The M-class minelayers were a class of eight (nine planned) small controlled minelayers commissioned into the Royal Navy between 1939 and 1943.

== Ships ==
M-class minelayers
Name	Builder	Launched	Fate	Notes
Miner I	Philip and Son	1939		
Miner II	Philip and Son	1939	sunk as target on 18 March 1970	later named Gossamer
Miner III	Philip and Son	1939		
Miner IV	Philip and Son	1940		
Miner V	Philip and Son	1940	Sunk as target on 6 June 1970	
Miner VI	Philip and Son	1942		
M7	Singapore Dockyard	-	Seized in Singapore by Japanese forces before completed	
Miner VII	Philip and Son	1944		
Miner VIII	Philip and Son	1943	Broken up in 1980	
