= List of storms named Patsy =

The name Patsy has been used for nine tropical cyclones worldwide, seven exclusively in the Western Pacific Ocean and one formed in the Central Pacific Ocean and crossed the International Dateline into the Western Pacific.

- Typhoon Patsy (1955) (T5527) – Category 4 super typhoon, struck the Philippines as a tropical storm
- Hurricane Patsy (1959) (T5912, 29W) (Typhoon Patsy) – Category 5 hurricane and Category 4-equivalent typhoon, crossed the International Dateline twice, and remained in the open ocean
- Typhoon Patsy (1962) (T6211, 51W) – struck Samar, in the Philippines, and China
- Typhoon Patsy (1965) (T6501, 01W, Bining) – struck the Philippines
- Tropical Storm Patsy (1967) (T6723, 26W) – struck China and North Vietnam
- Typhoon Patsy (1970) (T7025, 27W, Yoling) – Category 4 super typhoon, struck the Philippines and North Vietnam
- Typhoon Patsy (1973) (T7317, 19W, Miling) – Category 5-equivalent super typhoon, brushed the Philippines
- Tropical Storm Patsy (1977) (T7701, 01W) – remained out at sea

In the South Pacific Ocean:

- Cyclone Patsy (1986) – a Category 2 tropical cyclone that affected Vanuatu and New Caledonia but caused little or no damage to the island nation.
