= Weeks 533 =

Barge-mounted crane

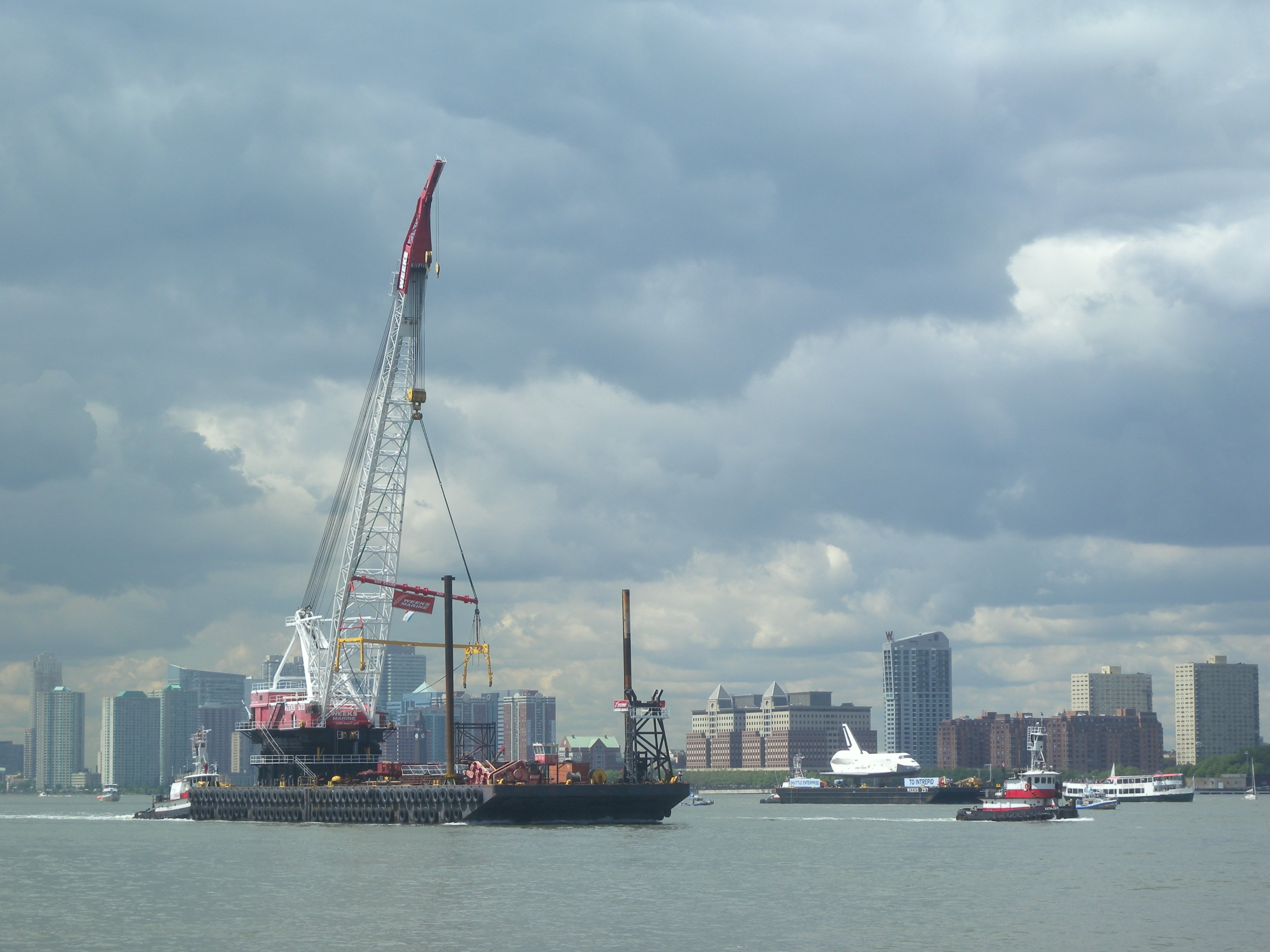
- The Weeks 533 crane vessel passes Newport, Jersey City

History
- Name: Weeks 533 (2000–present); McDermott DB-xx (197x–1988); Marine Boss (1966–197x)
- Operator: Weeks Marine
- Ordered: 1965
- Builder: Zidell Explorations (barge)
- Completed: 1966
- Acquired: 1988
- In service: Weeks (2000–present); McDermott (197x–1988); Murphy Pacific (1966–197x)
- Home port: Jersey City, New Jersey
- Identification: USCG ID 501953
- Status: In service

General characteristics
- Class & type: Floating barge crane
- Tonnage: 5392
- Length: 300 feet (91 m)
- Beam: 90 feet (27 m)
- Draught: 21 feet (6 m)
- Installed power: 350kW, 1x Caterpillar 3406 diesel genset
- Propulsion: none

Weeks 533 is a 500-short-ton (454 t) capacity Clyde Iron Works model 52 barge-mounted crane which is the largest revolving floating crane on the East Coast of the United States. It was originally ordered for bridge construction and has since been used in several notable heavy lifts.

== History ==
The floating barge-crane, originally named Marine Boss, was built for Murphy Pacific Marine. The barge was assembled by Zidell Explorations from scrapped ship steel in Oregon in 1966 and fitted in San Francisco with a heavy 500-ton revolving crane made by Clyde Iron Works to perform the heavy girder and deck-section lifts for construction of the 1967 San Mateo-Hayward Bridge. At the time it was the largest barge crane in the western United States.

In the 1970s, Marine Boss was sold to J. Ray McDermott & Co., who had introduced the first 500-ton floating cranes for offshore platform construction in 1965 and were operating a similar fleet of barge-cranes under the McDermott Derrick Barge (DB) class. McDermott would later sell it for scrap in 1988 to Weeks Marine in New Jersey, who renamed it the Weeks 533 and refurbished it from 1997-2000. Weeks 533 is considered the flagship of the Weeks fleet.

One of the tugboats returning Weeks 533 from Albany to New Jersey collided with the moored 750t crane barge N181 (aka Hank Hummel) near the Tappan Zee Bridge at night in heavy fog on 12 March 2016. That tug, the Specialist, subsequently sank, killing all three sailors. Although the mate, who was at the helm of Specialist, initially jumped clear from the stricken tug onto N181, he returned to help free a trapped crewmate and all hands aboard subsequently drowned.

=== Capacity ===
The Clyde Iron Works Model 52-DE crane can lift 500 short tons (454 t) using the main hoist on a 210-foot (64 m) boom at any point in the crane's revolution; capacity rises to 600 short tons (544 t) when using the main hoist oriented astern. The capacity of the middle lift is 150 000 lbs, of the small lift on the top of the boom is 50 000 lbs. Motive power for the main hoist is provided by a Caterpillar 3412 V-12 diesel engine, and electric power for the barge is provided by a Caterpillar 3406 I-6 diesel generator set.

=== Bridges built ===
- Rio Vista Bridge replacement span (1967)
- San Mateo–Hayward Bridge (1967)
- San Diego–Coronado Bridge (1969)
- Queensway Twin Bridges (1971), near RMS Queen Mary at the Port of Long Beach
- Fremont Bridge (Portland) (1973)
- Francis Scott Key Bridge replacement (2028)
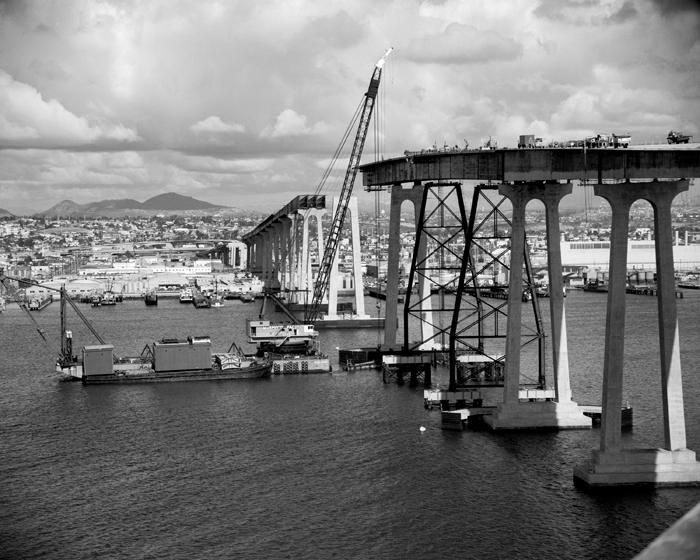
Murphy Pacific's Marine Boss at work on the San Diego–Coronado Bridge (c.1968)

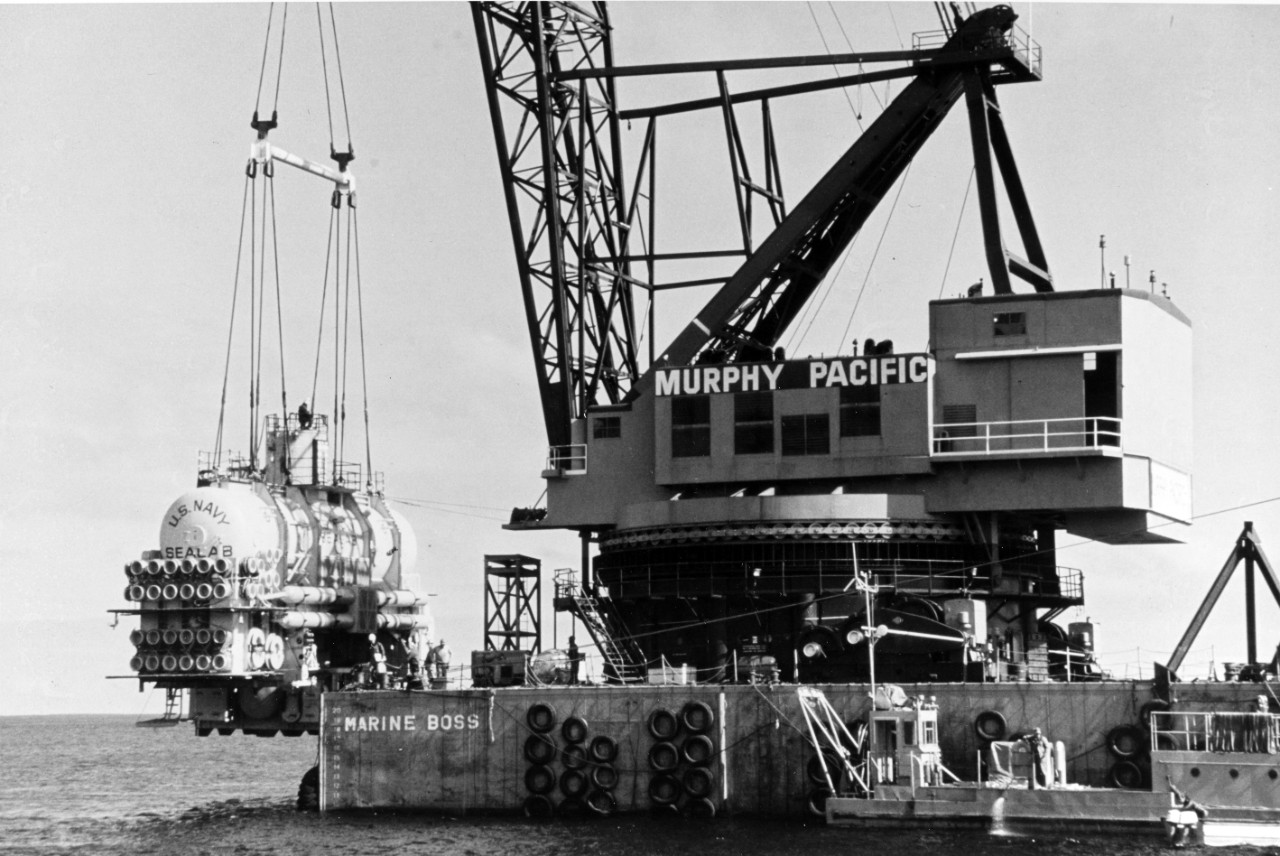
Marine Boss moving SEALAB III near San Clemente Island (Dec 1968)

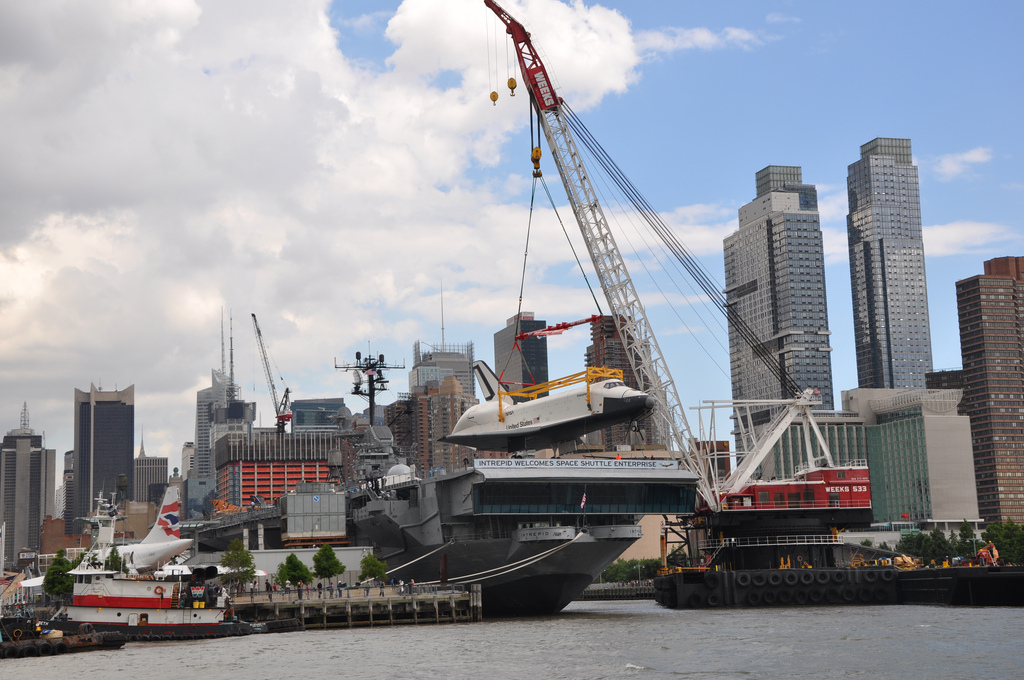
Weeks 533 lifts the Enterprise onto USS Intrepid (2012)

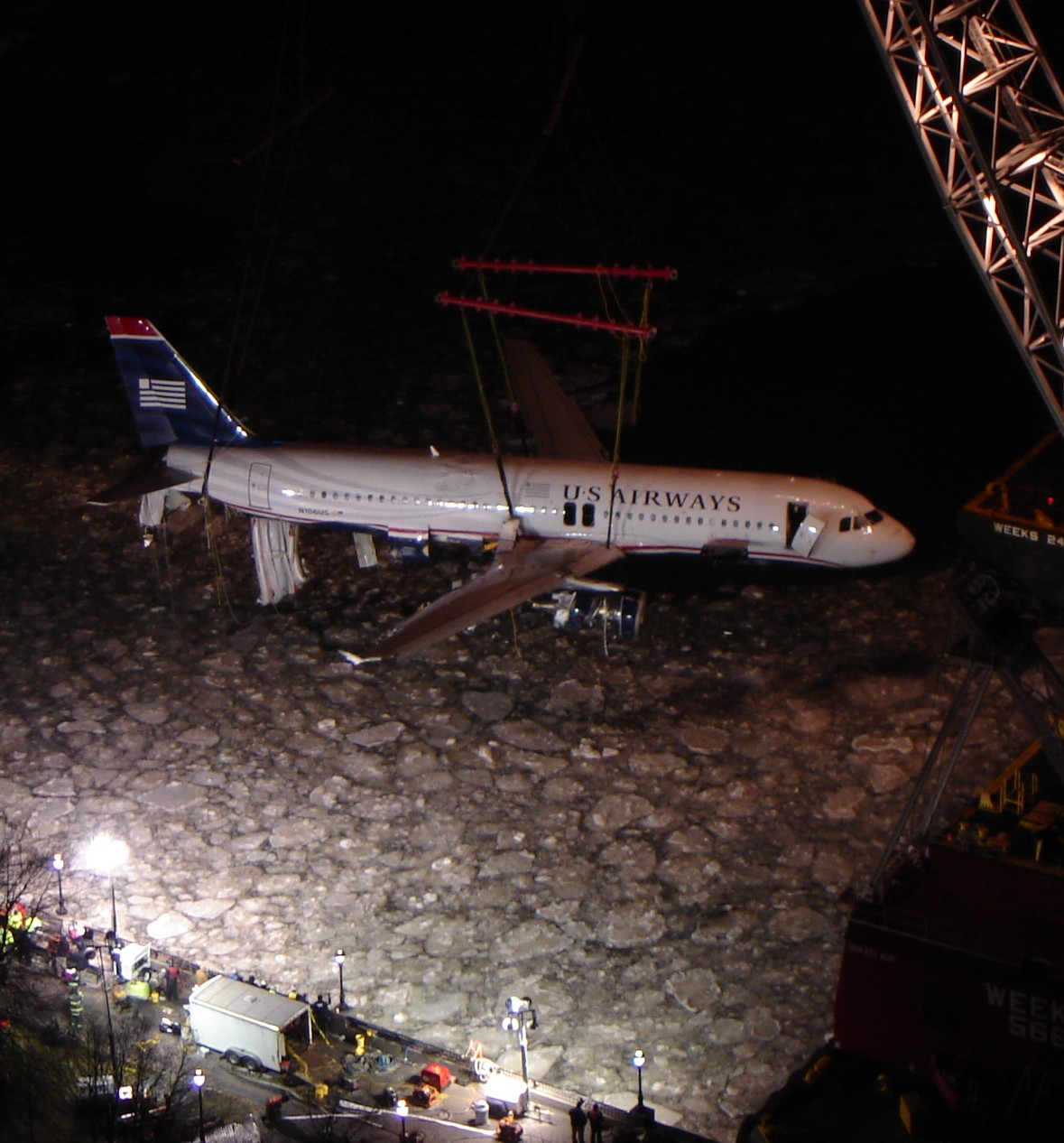
US Airways Flight 1549

=== Notable heavy lifts ===
- UGM-73 Poseidon missile test facility structural members at Hunters Point Naval Shipyard (1967)
- SEALAB III, off the coast of San Clemente Island (1969)
- Pier protection system for the Tappan Zee Bridge (2000)
- Cleanup of the World Trade Center in New York City from the September 11 attacks (2001), moored below 55 Water Street.
- The capsized MV Stellamare at the Port of Albany–Rensselaer (2003, as a team with Donjon's Chesapeake 1000)
- The downed Airbus A320 hull of US Airways Flight 1549 (2009) from the Hudson River
- Concorde G-BOAD on Pier 86 (2008) and Enterprise (2012) onto the Intrepid Sea, Air & Space Museum
- The old main span of the East 78th Street pedestrian bridge and the replacement span (2011–2012) over FDR Drive.
- The replacement New York–New Jersey Rail Greenville Yard transfer bridge (2013) in the wake of Hurricane Sandy.
- Steel jacket foundations for Block Island Wind Farm (2015).
- Salvage of the collapsed Francis Scott Key Bridge and MV Dali from the Port of Baltimore (2024, as a team with Donjon's Chesapeake 1000).
