= TSS Empire Byng =

World War II merchant ship of the United Kingdom

History
- Name: Empire Byng (1944-51); Peter Dal II (1951-55); Benwyvis (1955-63); Southern Comet (1963-68); Marites (1968-72)
- Owner: Ministry of War Transport (1944-45); Ministry of Transport (1945-51); Dalhousie Steam & Motorshipping Co Ltd (1951-54); Novacastria Shipping Co Ltd (1954-55); Ben Line Steamers Ltd (1955-63); Bacong Shipping SA (1963-68); Peoples Bank & Trust Co (1968-72)
- Operator: P & O Steam Navigation Co Ltd (1944-46); Dalhousie Steam & Motor Shipping Co Ltd (1946-51); Nomikos (London) Ltd (1951-55); Ben Line Steamers Ltd (1955-63); Southern Industrial Projects Inc (1963-68); Peoples Bank & Trust Co (1968-72)
- Port of registry: (United Kingdom) Greenock (1944-51); (United Kingdom) London (1951-55); (United Kingdom) Leith (1955-63); Panama City (1963-68); (Philippines) Manila (1968-72)
- Builder: Greenock Dockyard Co, Greenock.
- Yard number: 458
- Launched: 16 November 1944
- Completed: May 1945
- Out of service: 19 November 1970
- Identification: UK Official Number 169521 (1944-63); Code Letters GFNY (1944-51)
- Fate: Scrapped

General characteristics
- Tonnage: 7,832 GRT; 4,418 NRT; 9,175 DWT
- Length: 451 ft 3 in (137.54 m)
- Beam: 66 ft 9 in (20.35 m)
- Depth: 30 ft 7 in (9.32 m)
- Propulsion: 1 x steam turbine

Empire Byng was a 7,832 GRT heavy lift ship which was built in 1944 for the Ministry of War Transport (MoWT). Completed in May 1945, she was sold in 1951 and renamed Peter Dal II. Further sales saw her renamed Benwyvis, Southern Comet and Marites. In November 1970, she ran aground at Manila Bay in Typhoon Patsy. Marites was scrapped in 1972.

== Description ==
Empire Byng was built by Greenock Dockyard Co, Greenock for the MoWT. She was yard number 458. Empire Byng was launched on 16 November 1944 and completed in May 1945.

The ship was 451 feet 3 inches (137.54 m) long, with a beam of 66 feet 9 inches (20.35 m) and a depth of 30 feet 7 inches (9.32 m). She was propelled by a steam turbine which drove an electric motor and a single screw. The turbine was built by General Electric Co Ltd, Erith. She had a GRT of 7,832 NRT of 4,418, and a DWT of 9,175.

== Career ==
Empire Byng was initially operated under the management of P & O Steam Navigation Co Ltd. Her port of registry was Greenock.

Shortly after the end of the Second World War, Empire Byng was used to deliver a number of MoWT tugs. TID 125, TID 126, TID 131, TID 132 and TID 133 were all delivered from Bromborough Dock to Bombay, India. Empire Byng departed on 22 May 1945 and arrived on 19 June.

In 1946, management of Empire Byng was transferred to Dalhousie Steam & Motorshipping Co Ltd, London. In 1946, Empire Byng was sold to Dalhousie Steam & Motorshipping and was renamed Peter Dal II. She was operated under the management of Nomikos (London) Ltd. In 1954, Peter Dal II was sold to Novocastria Shipping Co Ltd, remaining under the management of Nomikos.

In 1955, Peter Dal II was sold to Ben Line Steamers Ltd and renamed Benwyvis. She served with the Ben Line until 1963 when she was sold to Bacong Shipping SA, Panama and was renamed Southern Comet. She was operated under the management of Southern Industrial Projects Inc, Manila. In 1968, Southern Comet was sold to the People's Bank and Trust Company, Philippines and renamed Marites. On 19 November 1970, Marites was driven aground in Manila Bay during Typhoon Patsy. She was refloated on 29 November, and laid up at South Harbour, Manila. In 1972, Marites was sold for scrap, arriving at Hong Kong on 8 February 1972.

In 1984, Southern Comet was mentioned in an appeal case relating to repairs done by the Pioneer Iron Works, Manila, who had not been paid for such work. The appeal was denied.

== Official Numbers and Code Letters ==
Official Numbers were a forerunner to IMO Numbers. Empire Byng, Peter Dal II and Benwyvis had the United Kingdom Official Number 1695921.

Empire Byng used the Code Letters GFNY.
