= Eastcliffe Hall =

American Great Lakes bulk carrier

Coordinates: 44.8950°N 75.1609°W

History

Canada
- Name: Eastcliffe Hall
- Operator: Hall Corporation of Canada
- Builder: Canadian Vickers Ltd. of Montreal, Quebec, Canada
- Christened: Eastcliffe Hall
- Completed: 1954
- Fate: Wrecked in the Saint Lawrence River, near Morrisburg, Ontario, 14 July 1970

General characteristics
- Type: Bulk carrier
- Tonnage: 3,335 GRT
- Length: 342.5 ft (104.4 m)
- Propulsion: Diesel

Eastcliffe Hall was a Great Lakes bulk carrier which sank in the Saint Lawrence Seaway on the morning of 14 July 1970 with the loss of nine crewmen and family members.

== History ==
Eastcliffe Hall was built by Canadian Vickers Limited of Montreal, Quebec, Canada, and used as a cargo ship on the North American Great Lakes. Originally 252.5 feet (77.0 m) in length with gross register tonnage (GRT) of 2,140, she was subsequently lengthened to 342.5 feet (104.4 m) and her tonnage increased to 3,335 GRT, with 5,750 tons deadweight capacity. She was operated by the Hall Corporation and carried a variety of cargoes through the Great Lakes-Saint Lawrence Seaway system.

== Last voyage ==
On her last voyage, Eastcliffe Hall sailed southwest on the Saint Lawrence River from the port of Sorel, Quebec, bound for Saginaw, Michigan, under the command of Captain Richard Groulx, with a cargo of 5,661 long tons (5,752 t) of pig iron ingots and 21 crewmen and family members aboard. After passing Montreal, the ship made her way through the Snell and Eisenhower locks before running aground on the Gooseneck Island shoal in the early morning hours of 14 July. The captain and crew freed the ship from the shoal only to strike another underwater abutment near Crysler Shoal a short time later. The captain was repeatedly told that the ship had run aground but he refused to believe it. At one point, he remarked "It's alright. Apparently there is no damage to my barge". This was the final message received from Captain Groulx. The ship sank near Morrisburg, Ontario, in three minutes in about 70 feet (21.3 m) of water with the loss of the captain, his son Alain, and seven others, including engineer William Demers, his wife Jacqueline, and their six-year-old daughter Nathalie. Two of the surviving crew members reported that the ship sank so fast that the inrush of current compressed the air in the engine room so much that it blasted them through a hole in the skylight. The surviving crew members clung to wreckage until being rescued. The Canadian and United States Coast Guards rescued 12 crew members.

== Inquiry into sinking ==
On 26 August 1970 an official inquiry was begun to determine the cause of the ship's sinking. The inquiry was presided by Judge Francois Chevalier of Hull, Quebec, a justice of the Superior Court of Quebec. The inquiry was requested by Canadian Minister of Transport Don Jamieson.

During the inquiry, it was revealed that blood tests from the body of the captain revealed a high blood alcohol content, 360 milligrams per 100 millilitres of alcohol or 0.36 percent weight by volume. This was concluded by chemist John Howes, employed by the Centre for Forensic Sciences, University of Toronto, who conducted the testing and informed the inquiry of the high alcohol content in the captain's body. Howes was quoted as saying, "There would be every indication of mental and physical drunkenness in the average person. The average person would be nearly unconscious. They would have difficulty walking, talking, muscular coordination and seeing... He wouldn't be able to act immediately to an emergency. It is possible he might not react at all."

The inquiry concluded with a 49-page report wherein Justice Chevalier concluded that the sinking of Eastcliffe Hall was due to the captain's "state of plain drunkenness". Justice Chevalier also noted, "That the ship and all its contents, cargo, and human beings were in the hands of a blind man who did not know where he was nor what he was doing."

== Shipwreck ==
Following the sinking, Eastcliffe Hall's protruding masts and cargo were removed and the forward superstructure was dynamited back into the forward hold to clear the site as a navigational hazard. Though the surface currents are quick, the ship has since become a popular destination for recreational divers.
