= MV Lairdsfield =

The MV Lairdsfield was a British motor cargo vessel that capsized. On 6 February 1970 she was en route to Cork, Ireland from Teesport, North Yorkshire, England. The ship capsized in Tees Bay, 1 nm East of Teesport, resulting in the deaths of all ten crew. MV Lairdsfield was raised and later broken up at Middlesbrough in March 1970.
