= Irving Whale =

Barge known for sinking (1970) and refloating (1996)

History
- Name: Irving Whale 1967–1970; ATL 2701 2001–2009; Atlantic Sea Lion 2009–current
- Owner: J.D. Irving Ltd.
- Operator: Atlantic Towing
- Port of registry: Canada
- Route: Atlantic Canada
- Builder: Saint John Shipbuilding & Dry Dock Company Ltd., Saint John
- Laid down: 1966
- Launched: 1966
- Christened: 1967
- Completed: 1967
- In service: Irving Whale (1967-1970); ATL 2701 (2001-2009); Atlantic Sea Lion (2009-current)
- Out of service: 7 September 1970 (sunk at 47°22'N, 63°20'W)
- Identification: Atlantic Sea Lion
- Fate: Salvaged (30 July 1996)
- Status: active as Atlantic Sea Lion 2009-
- Notes: Irving Whale refloated (1996), renamed ATL 2701 (2001), renamed Atlantic Sea Lion (2009)

General characteristics
- Tonnage: 3,734 t (3,675 long tons); 1,819 t (1,790 long tons) [net]
- Length: 77.69 m (254.9 ft)
- Beam: 17.68 m (58.0 ft)
- Draught: 5.03 m (16.5 ft)
- Decks: 1
- Propulsion: non-propelled
- Speed: 0 0 kn (0 km/h)

Irving Whale is a Canadian barge that sank off the north coast of Prince Edward Island, while en route from Halifax, Nova Scotia to Bathurst, New Brunswick, with a cargo of Bunker C oil in a rich fishing area. It is "one of Canada's most notorious nautical disasters". The barge, owned by J.D. Irving Ltd., had carried oil for JDI from 1967 until it sank in 1970. She was refloated in 1996, re-fitted as a deck barge, re-activated, and renamed ATL 2701 in 2001 and renamed again in 2009, as Atlantic Sea Lion. Since the accident, she only transports dry cargo.

The barge was refloated in a complex, $42 million 70-hour successful recovery in July 1996. It had been well-built and was in "remarkably good condition, preserved by the cool waters and smooth seabed of the Gulf of St. Lawrence."

The barge was reclaimed by JDI Irving Limited, and towed to Halifax by JDI's Atlantic Towing, where the oil and PCBs were pumped out and the oil sold.

Atlantic Sea Lion, Atlantic Marlin/Swordfish, Atlantic Shark, Atlantic Tuna, and Irving Beaver, are the five barges currently listed in the service of JDI's subsidiary Atlantic Towing.

The federal government of Canada lost a lawsuit through which an attempt was made to recoup the $42 million for the recovery of the Irving Whale. In 2000, the federal government reached a $5 million out-of-court settlement with JDI, which was described as the "worst precedent" of the "Polluter Pays Principle". JDI is a subsidiary of the powerful 96-year-old family-run Saint John, New Brunswick-based Irving Group of Companies, founded by the entrepreneur and industrialist, K. C. Irving OC (1899–1992). (Note: In 1924, K.C. Irving opened his first garage and service station in Bouctouche, New Brunswick.)

== Background ==
The ATL 2701/Atlantic Sea Lion "has a "darkly ironic cargo of bad memories from one of Canada's most notorious nautical disasters." In 1970, the Irving Whale sank in the Gulf of St. Lawrence off Prince Edward Island, taking 4,200 tonnes of fuel oil down with it. About 1,100 tonnes of oil spilled into the ocean, including 5,700 kilograms of oil laced with PCBs."

— Reinhart. The Globe and Mail. 11 December 2007

The barge—Irving Whale—was laid down at the Saint John Shipbuilding & Dry Dock Co., Ltd., Saint John in 1966. She was launched and commissioned by owner J.D. Irving Limited in 1967. The barge was designed as a tanker barge to carry petroleum products, mostly fuel oil, in spacious eight below-deck cargo tanks, in addition to deck cargo on the main deck. From 1967 to 1970, Irving Whale saw extensive use in the waters of Atlantic Canada after entering service. The barge's fuel cargo tanks were used exclusively by Irving Oil, a sister company to barge owner J.D. Irving Ltd. She delivered fuel oil such as Bunker C to major industrial customers such as electrical generating stations and pulp and paper mills, as well as top-deck general cargo.

In stormy weather, on 7 September 1970, Irving Whale, loaded with Bunker C oil for the Irving Oil Company and carrying PCBs for its heating system, sank in approximately 67 m (220 ft) of water 60 km (32 nmi) northeast of North Cape, Prince Edward Island and 100 km (54 nmi) southwest of Cap du Sud-Ouest, Magdalen Islands. In a 1996 CBC report, as she remained at the bottom of the ocean, it called Irving Whale "a pollution timebomb", located in a "very rich fishing area"-an "ecological system" that stretched far into the southern Gulf of Saint Lawrence.

According to a 1995 Maclean's article, J. D. Irving Ltd., took possession of Irving Whale and her cargo and was considering at that time "whether it can be repaired and used again—and whether the oil it was carrying [could] be sold." In 1997, Irving Whale was renamed and repurposed. She now is used exclusively to carry general cargo on deck, such as wood chips and structural steel. Her area of operations is primarily Atlantic Canada. In December 2007 ATL 2701 was contracted to haul a cargo of steel pipes through the St. Lawrence Seaway into Lake Ontario destined for the Portlands Energy Centre project in Toronto Harbour. The ATL 2701/Atlantic Sea Lion was reported in 2018 as frequently wintering over in Halifax, and mainly being used by Irving to "transport components from Irving Shipbuilding's Woodside fabrication facility to the Halifax Shipyard."

== Sinking of the Irving Whale (1970) ==
On Saturday, 5 September 1970, the tugboat Irving Maple departed Halifax, Nova Scotia towing Irving Whale at 0845 local time. Irving Whale was carrying a cargo of 4,270 t (4,200 long tons) or approximately 4,351,800 L (1,149,600 US gal) of Bunker C, also known as #6 fuel oil, destined for the Consolidated-Bathurst Inc. pulp mill in Bathurst, New Brunswick.

Irving Maple towed Irving Whale east from Halifax Harbour along the Eastern Shore, then through the Strait of Canso, transiting the Canso Canal into the Northumberland Strait on Sunday 6 September 1970 at 1300 local time. The tug/barge took a northerly course into the central Gulf of St. Lawrence, passing between East Point, Prince Edward Island and the Magdalen Islands before turning northwest toward the entrance of Chaleur Bay.

The tug/barge made approximately 8 kn (15 km/h) until reaching the open Gulf of St. Lawrence between Prince Edward Island and the Magdalen Islands, where Irving Maple reported wind gusts approaching 32 kn (59 km/h) and choppy seas early on the morning of Monday, 7 September 1970.

At approximately 0700, Irving Maple reported a vibration in the tow rope and it was decided to lengthen the tow from 321 m (1,053 ft) to 482 m (1,581 ft) out of concern that Irving Whale might strike the tugboat.

The unmanned barge- according to witnesses- was "riding low in the water under the weight of 4,297 tons 4,773,967 litres of Bunker C fuel oil."

Immediately after the tow was lengthened, the stern of Irving Whale submerged and the barge took a 45° list. The crew of Irving Maple provided continuous radio updates to the Canadian Coast Guard as they observed the barge founder over the next 3 hours.

At 1023 local time on 7 September 1970, Irving Whale sank at 47°22′09″N 63°19′46″W in approximately 67 m (220 ft) of water. The location of the wreck in the centre of the Gulf of St. Lawrence was approximately 60 km (32 nmi) northeast of North Cape, Prince Edward Island and 100 km (54 nmi) southwest of Cap du Sud-Ouest, Magdalen Islands.

The exact location of the wreck was known immediately after the sinking as Irving Maple's tow line remained connected to Irving Whale.

Since Irving Whale sank stern first following progressive flooding over a three-hour period, the barge ended up settling in an upright position. The seafloor in the vicinity of the wreck was level and composed of sedimentary sandstone and sand.

The cause of the sinking was attributed to two possible causes as a result of poor weather conditions which potentially caused seawater to accumulate in the aft end of the open deck cargo area, or seawater to flood the engine room through an open door (the barge had a small engine for powering oil cargo pumps and heating systems).

== Irving Whale bunker C fuel and PCBs ==
For 2 days following the sinking, bunker C fuel oil leaked from Irving Whale, covering an area of approximately 400 km^{2} (120 sq nmi). Approximately 200 t (200 long tons) of bunker C washed ashore on the Magdalen Islands, polluting approximately 80 km (43 nmi) of shoreline; 200,000 bags of oil debris were recovered during cleanup operations in fall 1970 on the Magdalen Islands and buried in sand dunes there. An unknown amount of bunker C floated into the Atlantic Ocean through the Cabot Strait and some washed ashore on Prince Edward Island as well. Over the 26 years following the sinking of the Irving Whale, oil leak affected "about 80 kilometres of shoreline on the nearby Magdalen Islands and leaked into the Atlantic Ocean from the wreck".

In the fall of 1970, a visual inspection was undertaken of the wreck by a submersible vessel. Divers secured pressure relief vents to prevent further leaks. The sinking of Irving Whale resulted in the heating system for the bunker C shutting down. Within days, the cold waters of the Gulf of St. Lawrence caused the oil to congeal, reducing leakage from the barge.

At the time of its sinking in 1970, the location of Irving Whale wreck was considered international waters since it was located further than 12 nmi (22 km) from the nearest shoreline. As a result, the International Convention on Civil Liability for Oil Pollution Damage held jurisdiction over the pollution caused by the cargo of bunker C leaking from wreck of Irving Whale. Canada's ratification of the Third United Nations Convention on the Law of the Sea (UNCLOS III) in 1977 saw its jurisdiction extended beyond the 12 nmi (22 km) territorial sea to include waters within the new 200 nautical miles (370 km) exclusive economic zone, thus taking jurisdiction over the Irving Whale wreck.

As a result of the sinking, J.D. Irving Ltd. abandoned ownership of the wreck, since it was considered to be in international waters.

From the time of its sinking in 1970 until its salvage in 1996 the Canadian Coast Guard made regular aircraft and surface surveillance of the wreck site to check for pollution; Transport Canada, Fisheries and Oceans Canada and Environment Canada assisted CCG in surveillance operations. Irving Whale lost approximately 1,100 t (1,100 long tons) of bunker C, leaving approximately 3,100 t (3,100 long tons) of its cargo of fuel oil on board. Throughout the 1970s until its salvage in 1996, Irving Whale had continued to experience minor leakage from her cargo vents and other valves. Throughout the 26-year period it was submerged in the salt waters of the Gulf of St. Lawrence, the thickness of the barge's steel hull was reduced by approximately 5 mm (0.20 in) as a result of corrosion.

In his May 2014 court decision on Irving versus their insurers, Justice Sean Harrington said that the federal "government of the day was pursuing a political agenda...This was post Exxon Valdez"—in reference to the 1989 Exxon Valdez oil spill. "[T]he principle of 'polluter pays' was in vogue...although the precise timing of the refloating may have been political, the fact remains that the Irving Whale would have broken up, probably sooner, rather than later, she would corrode and break up, releasing well over 3,000 [tonnes] of oil to the great prejudice of the marine habitat, the shoreline, and those dependent upon the sea and shore."

Transport Canada conducted detailed inspections of the Irving Whale wreck in 1989 and 1990 which confirmed that the barge was leaking approximately 80 L (21 US gal) of bunker C per day. In September 1990 the Public Review Panel on Tanker Safety and Marine Response Capability noted the thinning of the barge's hull and the potential for a catastrophic release of the remaining cargo of bunker C fuel oil. It recommended a decision be made within 12 months on whether to remove the oil and/or raise Irving Whale. Both Transport Canada and Environment Canada commissioned two additional studies in 1992 to evaluate options for dealing with the barge and its cargo; both studies recommended pumping the oil without raising the barge. In 1993, the Ship-source Oil Pollution Fund, Canada's domestic replacement to the International Convention on Civil Liability for Oil Pollution Damage, commissioned a study of Irving Whale; it confirmed both pumping the oil or lifting the barge with oil on board were feasible, however lifting the barge with the oil was preferable as it was less risky to the environment.

A 1993 inspection of the wreck confirmed additional small leaks from cargo vents; hatches were reinforced and the vents sealed. A 1994 inspection of the wreck confirmed several vents were still leaking 20 L (5.3 US gal) per day, far less than the previous year. That same year, the CCG created two Public Advisory Committees, one in Prince Edward Island and the other in the Magdalen Islands as part of a consultation process for dealing with the wreck.

In 1994 the Government of Canada committed to raising Irving Whale and cleaning the wreck site from contamination.

== $42 million Irving Whale salvage (1996) ==
In 1971, the Government of Canada Department of Transport issued a biddings for dredging of the Irving Whale. In a 19 March 1975 CBC As it Happens interview, five years after the sinking, concerns were raised about an ecological catastrophe on PEI shores with a million gallons of Bunker C still in the hold of the Whale. Conservative MP for P.E.I. Keith McQuarrie, said that a dredging project to raise the Whale had been dropped because of overpriced bidding by 3 companies—Atlantic Salvage and Dredging, Marine Industries Limited, and Murphy Industries, who had submitted tenders in 1973 ranging from $1.7 million to over $4 million. The estimates were higher than the government had estimated so no dredging was undertaken. A later investigation on corporations colluding in a number tenders involving twenty defendants, resulted in the Supreme Court Case R v Canadian Dredge & Dock Co. The Irving Whale dredging tender was part of this case and it was revealed that a process of bid rigging had occurred. The defendants included four corporations-Canadian Dredge & Dock Company, Marine Industries Limited, The J.P. Porter Company Limited, and Richelieu Dredging Corporation Inc.). The corporations were charged and convicted of fraud and conspiracy.

On 23 June 1995, J.D. Irving Ltd. revealed the presence of PCB fluid within the cargo heating system pipes of the barge. The Canadian Coast Guard were embarrassed that they had not detected the presence of PCBs.

Concerns were raised that the PCBs could be released if attempts were made to raise the Whale or to remove the Bunker C oil. In response to the filing of an injunction by the "Société pour vaincre la pollution Inc." (SVP) and the "Regroupement madelinot pour la protection du golfe Inc." to stop salvage efforts pending an investigation under the Canadian Environmental Protection Act. The Federal Court of Canada granted a three-month court injunction 21 August 1995, to halt the operation, which has already begun with preparatory work on the barge on 18 July 1995. The recovery was postponed until the next "weather window" in summer 1996. Environmentalists called the Irving Whale "a pollution timebomb" as the Whale was in a "very rich fishing area"-an "ecological system" that stretches far into the southern Gulf of Saint Lawrence.

In March 1995 Environment Canada reached an agreement with an Irving Oil company—Atlantic Towing Ltd.—to provide assistance in the salvage operation, and with Irving Shipbuilding, who would clean and recover of Irving Whale upon her salvage. In June 1995, Donjon McAllister Joint Venture of New Jersey won the contract to lift Irving Whale with a tendered price of $12.1 million.

Further analysis of the environmental consequences of salvaging Irving Whale took place in fall 1995 and winter 1996. In April 1996 SVP dropped its injunction against the project.

On 30 July 1996, Irving Whale was hoisted by derrick barges Chesapeake 1000 and Boabarge 9 to the surface in approximately 70 minutes. Irving Whale was then floated on board the semi-submersible barge Boabarge 10, which transported Irving Whale to Halifax, Nova Scotia. Irving Whale arrived in Halifax Harbour on 7 August 1996 and was transferred to the care of Irving Shipbuilding. The barge's cargo was removed and the cargo hold cleaned before the barge underwent a refit at Irving Shipbuilding subsidiary Halifax Dartmouth Industries Limited. Following refit, the barge was transferred to Atlantic Towing Ltd. and renamed ATL 2701 in 2001 for service as a general cargo barge. 'It was renamed again as Atlantic Sea Lion in 2009.

The Atlantic Sea Lion, the Atlantic Marlin/Swordfish, the Atlantic Shark, the Atlantic Tuna, and the Irving Beaver, are the five barges currently listed in the service of JDI's subsidiary Atlantic Towing.

== Federal government paid for $33 million salvage ==
The cost of the salvage operation was $42 million. This cost of the salvage operation, which totalled $42 million was assumed by the federal government with great controversy, given the wealth of Irving Oil Ltd., owner of the cargo of oil, and J.D. Irving Ltd., owner of the barge.

On 29 July 1997 the federal government sued in the Federal Court to recover the $42 million with the owners of Irving Whale, J.D. Irving Ltd., as well as the Ship Source Oil Pollution Fund and the International Oil Pollution Compensation Fund 1971. In Canada v J.D. Irving Ltd., the plaintiff (the federal government) sought action against the defendants (the barge's owners and charterers) based on the statutory liability of an "owner" under subsection 677(1) of the Canada Shipping Act, as well as on the torts of negligence and nuisance. The defendants centred their defence on whether the action by the government was time barred and whether legislation created after the sinking of Irving Whale could be applied retroactively. The case was heard on 9–10 December 1998 in Montreal. The decision was released on 21 December 1998 in favour of the defendants. The federal government filed an appeal in the Federal Court of Appeal in 1999 that was heard on 2 May 2000. The appeal was rejected.

On 17 July 2000, the federal government reached a $5 million out-of-court settlement with J.D. Irving Ltd. to recover some of the $42 million it cost to salvage of Irving Whale. Daniel Green of the environmental group SVP said if this is an example of the 1985 "Polluter Pays Principle", it is "the worst precedent that one could have." The $5 million is in addition to the $4 million that J.D. Irving Ltd. contributed during the recovery and clean-up of Irving Whale. In reality, Irving did not directly pay this $5 million, but managed to receive an insurance payout to cover this cost."The Canadian government had to pay the remainder of the recovery costs, which amounted to $33 million.

According to Irving, the company’s salvage company, Atlantic Salvage, had assisted with $4 million of the cleanup costs. J. D. Irving Ltd., environmental director, Bill Borland, said that the Irving organization had contributed "assistance worth "millions of dollars" by having tugs, barges and pumps at the scene in case of an oil spill during the operation."

== Reactivation as ATL 2701 ==
The Irving Whale was refit and renamed ATL 2701 and put into active service as a barge for the Irving company. Cargoes included wood chips, steel pipes mainly in Atlantic Canada and also in 2007 Toronto Harbour.

== Aftermath ==
Environment Canada said in February 1999, that testing showed that there were still approximately "150 kilograms of PCBs" on the ocean floor where the Whale had sunk. This represents approximately 1% of the amount of PCBs in the entire Gulf of St. Lawrence.While "neither human nor marine life" was "threatened", "commercial fishing in the immediate area" was "prohibited." The Department of Fisheries and Oceans announced in April 1999 that, based on a third party report and consultation with the "crab fishing industry", they would take a "precautionary approach in addressing the status of the fishing exclusion zone" and keep the existing closure in place while continuing long-term monitoring of the site contaminated by polychlorinated biphenyl (PCB).

While the dispute with the federal government had ended in 2000, with the Irving companies paying $5-million "without admitting liability", this legal battle between the Irvings and their insurers who, "coincidentally, had covered them for up to $5-million". The policy was decades-old and that the Irvings were not legally obliged to pay $5 million. In his May 2014 court decision which ruled in favour of the Irvings, Justice Sean Harrington said that the government had "concluded the Irving Whale was "a time bomb", and that "[s]ooner, rather than later, she would corrode and break up, releasing well over 3,000 [tonnes] of oil to the great prejudice of the marine habitat, the shoreline, and those dependent upon the sea and shore." If it had gone to trial, the settlement could have been as much as $20 million.

== See also ==
- List of shipwrecks in 1970
