= Typhoon Patsy =

Pacific typhoon in 1970

Typhoon Patsy (Yoling)
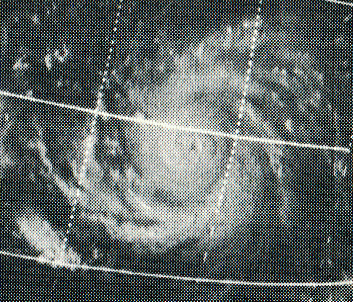
- Patsy with 110 mph winds on November 17

Meteorological history
- Formed: November 14, 1970
- Dissipated: November 22, 1970

Typhoon
- 10-minute sustained (JMA)
- Highest winds: 150 km/h (90 mph)
- Lowest pressure: 910 hPa (mbar); 26.87 inHg

Category 4-equivalent super typhoon
- 1-minute sustained (SSHWS/JTWC)
- Highest winds: 250 km/h (155 mph)
- Lowest pressure: 918 hPa (mbar); 27.11 inHg

Overall effects
- Fatalities: 271+ direct
- Missing: 351
- Damage: $80 million (1970 USD)
- Areas affected: Philippines, Vietnam
- IBTrACS
- Part of the 1970 Pacific typhoon season

Typhoon Patsy, known in the Philippines as Typhoon Yoling, was the twenty-seventh named storm, twelfth typhoon, and seventh super typhoon of the 1970 Pacific typhoon season.

On November 14, 1970, a tropical disturbance organized sufficiently to be designated a tropical depression. A steady intensification carried Tropical Storm Patsy's windspeeds up to 155 mph (250 km/h) and a minimum pressure of 918 mbar. It made landfall in Luzon with sustained winds of 130 mph (210 km/h) on November 19. After emerging in the South China Sea, Patsy remained at tropical storm strength. It struck Vietnam during the Vietnam War as a weak tropical storm on November 22. The 8-day-old cyclone dissipated shortly after its final landfall.

US$80 million ($403 million in 2005) in damage was reported to have been caused by Patsy, though the total was likely higher. Deaths were officially reported to be 241, but an estimated 30 people unofficially died in Vietnam, raising the toll to 271+. An additional 351 people were reported missing. The total deaths and damage will likely never be known, as the Vietnam War was raging at the same time.

== Meteorological history ==
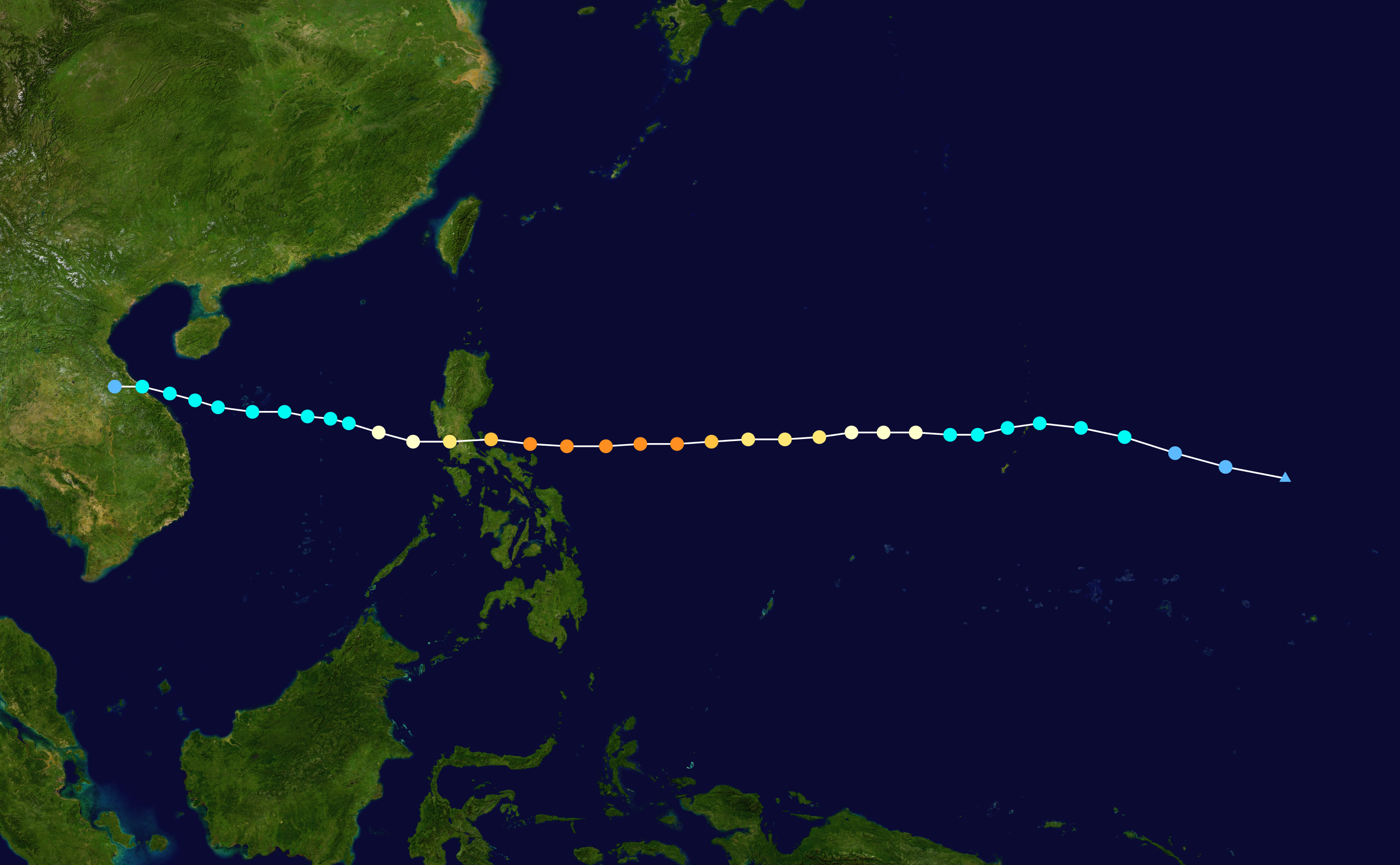
Map plotting the storm's track and intensity, according to the Saffir–Simpson scale Map key Saffir–Simpson scale Tropical depression (≤38 mph, ≤62 km/h) Tropical storm (39–73 mph, 63–118 km/h) Category 1 (74–95 mph, 119–153 km/h) Category 2 (96–110 mph, 154–177 km/h) Category 3 (111–129 mph, 178–208 km/h) Category 4 (130–156 mph, 209–251 km/h) Category 5 (≥157 mph, ≥252 km/h) Unknown Storm type Tropical cyclone Subtropical cyclone Extratropical cyclone, remnant low, tropical disturbance, or monsoon depression

A tropical disturbance was spotted south-southeast of Wake Island on November 10 close to the International Date Line and moved west. Warm waters and weakened shear allowed the storm to organize into Tropical Depression 27W on November 14 near the Marianas Islands. A strong ridge to its north forced it westward, where it upgraded to tropical storm status later on November 14, receiving the name Patsy.

When Patsy was just barely above the threshold of tropical storm-strength, it slowed and passed just north of Saipan. Patsy continued to steadily intensify, reaching typhoon strength on November 16, 200 miles (322 km) northwest of Guam. The typhoon peaked at 155 mph (250 km/h) on November 18.

Its inflow became disrupted by the Philippines to its west, and Patsy hit Luzon on November 19 with winds of 130 mph (210 km/h), making it the 3rd strong typhoon to strike the island since September and made a direct hit over the Greater Manila area (now as National Capital Region), catching many offguard. After crossing the Philippines and weakening to a Category 2, Patsy traversed the South China Sea, where cooler waters kept the system from strengthening. This caused the cyclone to continue a weakening trend until it was downgraded to a tropical storm on November 20. On November 22, Patsy struck Vietnam as a 45 mph (70 km/h) tropical storm, and dissipated soon after.

== Impact ==
Patsy killed 262 people, injured 1,756, with another 351 missing. Damage totals came in at US$80 million (US$403 million in 2005), mostly in the Philippines.

=== Philippines ===
Typhoon Patsy was one of the deadliest typhoons to strike the Philippines in its history. 106 people were killed (with 351 others missing) on the island, and 135 people were killed at sea from shipping failures. The USS President Taft was separated from its anchorage and collided with the Alikimon, a Greek vessel, while in Manila Bay. Another two ships were blown ashore in the Bay. On land, 31,380 of the refugees' homes were either destroyed or damaged. The mass destruction caused in the Greater Manila area, mainly by many being caught almost totally unprepared, destroyed many power lines and well into the next month, where many areas in the metropolis still waiting for electric power to be restored.

== Records ==
Patsy was the deadliest tropical cyclone to strike Manila since the establishment of the Philippine Weather Bureau in 1865 until 2009 when Typhoon Ketsana (Ondoy) affected the Philippine capital Manila, along with nearby provinces.

== See also ==
- Other storms with the same name
- Typhoon Joan (Sening; 1970) – a Category 5 super typhoon which crossed the Philippines in October 1970
- Typhoon Kate (Titang; 1970) – a Category 4 super typhoon which also struck the Philippines in October 1970
- Typhoon Xangsane (Milenyo; 2006) – a Category 4 typhoon that also made a direct hit at the Greater Manila Area
- Typhoon Rammasun (Glenda; 2014) – a Category 5 super typhoon which also severely affected Greater Manila Area
- Typhoon Vamco (Ulysses; 2020) – a Category 4 typhoon which took a similar track 50 years after Patsy
- Tropical Storm Nalgae (Paeng; 2022) – a tropical storm which had an erratic but similar track to Patsy
- Tropical Storm Fengshen (Ramil; 2025) – a weak tropical storm which also hit some same areas as Patsy
