= Soviet guard ship Metel =

Soviet WW2-era Uragan-class guard ship

History

Soviet Union
- Name: Metel
- Builder: Shipyard No.190 (Zhandov), Leningrad / Shipyard No.202 Dalzavod, Vladivostok
- Laid down: 18 December 1931
- Launched: 15 June 1934
- Completed: 18 November 1934
- Commissioned: 5 March 1935
- Reclassified: As training ship, 5 October 1945
- Stricken: 30 November 1954
- Honors and awards: Guards
- Fate: Scrapped, 30 November 1954

General characteristics (as built)
- Class & type: Uragan-class guard ship
- Displacement: 450 t (440 long tons) (standard)
- Length: 71.5 m (234 ft 7 in)
- Beam: 7.4 m (24 ft 3 in)
- Draught: 2.95 m (9 ft 8 in)
- Installed power: 2 water-tube boilers; 6,290 shp (4,690 kW)
- Propulsion: 2 shafts; 2 geared steam turbines
- Speed: 23 knots (43 km/h; 26 mph)
- Range: 1,250 nmi (2,320 km; 1,440 mi) at 14 knots (26 km/h; 16 mph)
- Complement: 108 men (1943)
- Armament: 2 × single 102 mm (4 in) guns; 2 × 7.62 mm (0.30 in) machine guns; 1 × triple 450 mm (17.7 in) torpedo tubes

Metel (Russian: Метель, lit. 'Blizzard') was a Guards Uragan-class guard ship built for the Soviet Navy during the 1930s. Commissioned in 1935, she was assigned to the Pacific Fleet. During World War II the ship participated in operations during the Soviet invasion of Manchuria in 1945. On 26 August Metel was awarded Guards status. Two months later she was converted into a training ship. Metel was struck from the navy list on 30 November 1954 and subsequently scrapped.

== Design and description ==
The Russian Civil War had shut down design and construction of all ships, both naval and commercial from 1917 to 1924, thus Soviet naval architects and shipyards lacked experience when the Soviet Navy decided to replace the few old Tsarist torpedo boats still in service. The initial requirement was based on that of the later batches of the World War I-era German A-class torpedo boat that could carry mines as necessary to serve as fleet escorts and conduct torpedo attacks. The Uragans were almost 6 knots (11 km/h; 6.9 mph) slower than designed due to this inexperience and, in their intended role, they "were complete failures – they were too slow for use as torpedo boats and of no value as ASW vessels because of their lack of depth-charge handling equipment and underwater detection devices".

=== General characteristics ===
The Series II Uragan-class ships, officially known as Project 4, displaced 450 metric tons (440 long tons) at standard load and 530 t (520 long tons) at full load. They were 71.5 m (234 ft 7 in) long overall, had a beam of 7.4 m (24 ft 3 in) and a draft of 2.95 m (9 ft 8 in). The ships had 14 main watertight compartments and a double bottom only underneath the machinery and boiler rooms. The crew of Metel's sister ship Vyuga numbered 108 in 1943.

The Uragan-class ships were powered by two Parsons geared steam turbines, each driving one propeller shaft using steam provided by a pair of three-drum boilers. The turbines of the Series II ships developed a total of 6,290 shaft horsepower (4,690 kW) which gave them a speed in service of 23 knots (43 km/h; 26 mph). Metel carried 116–119 metric tons (114–117 long tons) of fuel oil that gave her a range of 1,200 nautical miles (2,200 km; 1,400 mi) at 14 knots (26 km/h; 16 mph).

=== Armament and fire control ===
The main armament of the Uragan-class guard ships consisted of a pair of Tsarist-era 102-millimeter (4 in) Pattern 1911 guns in single mounts, one each forward and aft of the superstructure. Anti-aircraft defense was intended to be provided by four single 37-millimeter (1.5 in) 11-K AA guns; these were modified versions of the British 2-pounder (40 mm (1.6 in)) guns, but deteriorating relations with the United Kingdom prevented the Soviets from buying any of these weapons. A pair of 7.62-millimeter (0.3 in) Maxim machine guns were fitted in their place.

A rotating triple mount for 450 mm (17.7 in) torpedoes was fitted between the funnels. The Uragans were fitted with a pair of racks for 22 B-1 165-kilogram (364 lb) and 15 M-1 41-kilogram (90 lb) depth charges. Alternatively up to 20 KB mines could be carried using rails mounted on the main deck. No sonar was fitted so dropping depth charges was largely an act of futility. Two K-1 minesweeping paravanes were fitted on the main deck after the design was finalized. One DM-1 2-meter (6 ft 7 in) rangefinder was mounted above the open bridge and a 1-meter (3 ft 3 in) searchlight was fitted on a small platform abaft the rear funnel.

=== Modifications ===
Beginning in 1934, four semi-automatic 45 mm (1.8 in) 21-K AA guns in single mounts were being fitted to the Uragans. The 45 mm guns were generally mounted fore and aft of each of the 102 mm guns. Four years later 12.7 mm (0.50 in) DShK machine guns began replacing the Maxim machine guns. Around the same time ships began exchanging their 21-Ks for three single mounts for fully automatic 37 mm AA guns. These were usually positioned between the forward gun and the bridge, between the searchlight platform and the aft 102 mm gun, and abaft the rear gun. Some ships retained one or two of the 21-Ks into the war. When the Soviets began receiving 12.7 mm Colt-Browning machine guns through Lend-Lease, they began supplementing the DShKs aboard the Uragans, up to a total of six barrels in four mounts, with one twin-gun Colt-Browning mount replacing the searchlight in some ships. Beginning in 1942, gun shields for the 102 mm guns were installed. By 1945, Metel had had a British Type 291 radar installed.

== Construction and career ==
Metel was laid down in Shipyard No. 190 (Zhdanov) in Leningrad as yard number 423 on 18 December 1931. The ship was built in sections and then railed to Shipyard No.202 Dalzavod in Vladivostok for assembly. She was launched on 15 June 1934, completed on 18 November and commissioned on 5 March 1935. She was then assigned to the Pacific Fleet. Metel was refitting in 1941–1942 when the Axis powers invaded the Soviet Union (Operation Barbarossa) and saw no combat until the Soviets declared war on the Japanese Empire on 8 August 1945. During the invasion of Manchuria, the ship ferried troops to occupy the port of Chongjin in Japanese Korea on 15 August. She provided naval gunfire support to the troops through 16 August. Two days later Metel transported troops further south to Kimchaek. She was converted into a training ship on 5 October and was awarded Guards status on 26 August.
