= EML Sulev =

Three ships of the Estonian Navy have been named Sulev:

- EML Sulev (1924), the former German A-class torpedo boat A32 launched in 1916 and acquired (by Estonia) in 1924
- EML Sulev (M412), the former German Kondor class minesweeper Meteor launched in 1972 and acquired (by Estonia) in 1994
- EML Sulev (M312), the former German Lindau-class minesweeper Lindau launched in 1957 and acquired (by Estonia) in 2000
