= Soviet guard ship Groza =

WWII-era Uragan-class ship

- Groza shortly after completion in 1932

History

Soviet Union
- Name: Groza
- Namesake: Гроза, Russian for "thunder"
- Ordered: 1st Five-Year Plan
- Builder: Shipyard 190 (Zhdanov), Leningrad
- Laid down: 13 August 1927
- Launched: 28 September 1930
- Commissioned: 22 July 1932
- Out of service: 12 November 1952
- Renamed: As PKZ-51, 25 February 1953
- Reclassified: As a target ship, 12 November 1952; As an accommodation ship, 25 February 1953

General characteristics (as built)
- Class & type: Uragan-class guard ship
- Displacement: 490 t (480 long tons) (standard)
- Length: 71.5 m (234 ft 7 in)
- Beam: 7.4 m (24 ft 3 in)
- Draught: 2.95 m (9 ft 8 in)
- Installed power: 2 water-tube boilers; 5,700 shp (4,300 kW)
- Propulsion: 2 shafts; 2 geared steam turbines
- Speed: 21 knots (39 km/h; 24 mph)
- Range: 850 nmi (1,570 km; 980 mi) at 16 knots (30 km/h; 18 mph)
- Complement: 114 men (1943)
- Armament: 2 × single 102 mm (4 in) guns; 2 × 7.62 mm (0.30 in) machine guns; 1 × triple 450 mm (17.7 in) torpedo tubes

The Soviet guard ship Groza was a Uragan-class guard ship built for the Soviet Navy during the 1920s and 1930s. The ship was one of the Series I ships known officially as Project 2. Initially assigned to the Baltic Fleet, she was transferred to the Northern Flotilla shortly after she was commissioned in 1932 and played a minor role in the 1939–1940 Winter War against Finland.

During World War II, Groza initially provided naval gunfire support during Operation Barbarossa for Soviet troops defending the Rybachy Peninsula and then escorted Allied merchant ships in Soviet waters in 1942–1943. The ship briefly served as a target ship in 1952–1953 before being hulked as an accommodation ship in early 1953.

== Design and description ==
The Russian Civil War had shut down design and construction of all ships, both naval and commercial from 1917 to 1924, thus Soviet naval architects and shipyards lacked experience when the Soviet Navy decided to replace the few old Tsarist torpedo boats still in service. The initial requirement was based on that of the later batches of the World War I-era German A-class torpedo boat that could carry mines as necessary to serve as fleet escorts and conduct torpedo attacks. The Uragans were almost 6 knots (11 km/h; 6.9 mph) slower than designed due to this inexperience and, in their intended role, they "were complete failures – they were too slow for use as torpedo boats and of no value as ASW vessels because of their lack of depth-charge handling equipment and underwater detection devices".

=== General characteristics ===
The Series I Uragan-class ships, officially known as Project 2, displaced 490 metric tons (480 long tons) at standard load and 633 t (623 long tons) at full load. They were 71.5 m (234 ft 7 in) long overall, had a beam of 7.4 m (24 ft 3 in) and a draft of 2.95 m (9 ft 8 in). The ships had 14 main watertight compartments and a double bottom only underneath the machinery and boiler rooms. In 1943 Groza's crew numbered 114.

The Uragan-class ships were powered by two Parsons geared steam turbines, each driving one propeller shaft using steam provided by a pair of three-drum boilers. The turbines of the Series I ships developed a total of 5,700 shaft horsepower (4,300 kW) which gave them a speed in service of 21 knots (39 km/h; 24 mph). Groza carried 102–116 metric tons (100–114 long tons) of fuel oil that gave her a range of 850 nautical miles (1,570 km; 980 mi) at 16 knots (30 km/h; 18 mph).

=== Armament and fire control ===
The main armament of the Uragan-class guard ships consisted of a pair of Tsarist-era 102-millimeter (4 in) Pattern 1911 guns in single mounts, one each forward and aft of the superstructure. Anti-aircraft defense was intended to be provided by four single 37-millimeter (1.5 in) 11-K AA guns; these were modified versions of the British 2-pounder (40 mm (1.6 in)) guns, but deteriorating relations with the United Kingdom prevented the Soviets from buying any of these weapons. A pair of 7.62-millimeter (0.3 in) Maxim machine guns were fitted in their place.

A rotating triple mount for 450 mm (17.7 in) torpedoes was fitted between the funnels. The Uragans were fitted with a pair of racks for 22 B-1 165-kilogram (364 lb) and 15 M-1 41-kilogram (90 lb) depth charges. Alternatively up to 20 KB mines could be carried using rails mounted on the main deck. No sonar was fitted so dropping depth charges was largely an act of futility. Two K-1 minesweeping paravanes were fitted on the main deck after the design was finalized. One DM-1 2-meter (6 ft 7 in) rangefinder was mounted above the open bridge and a 1-meter (3 ft 3 in) searchlight was fitted on a small platform abaft the rear funnel.

=== Modifications ===
Beginning in 1934, four semi-automatic 45 mm (1.8 in) 21-K AA guns in single mounts were being fitted to the Uragans. The 45 mm guns were generally mounted fore and aft of each of the 102 mm guns. Four years later 12.7 mm (0.50 in) DShK machine guns began replacing the Maxim machine guns. Around the same time ships began exchanging their 21-Ks for three single mounts for fully automatic 37 mm AA guns. These were usually positioned between the forward gun and the bridge, between the searchlight platform and the aft 102 mm gun, and abaft the rear gun. Some ships retained one or two of the 21-Ks into the war. When the Soviets began receiving 12.7 mm Colt-Browning machine guns through Lend-Lease, they began supplementing the DShKs aboard the Uragans, up to a total of six barrels in four mounts, with one twin-gun Colt-Browning mount replacing the searchlight in some ships. Some Uragans had a pair of BMB-1 depth charge throwers installed on the stern in 1941; Groza received hers on 13 August. Beginning in 1942, gun shields for the 102 mm guns were installed. By 1943, the ship had had a British Type 128 sonar installed.

== Construction and career ==
Groza was laid down in Shipyard No. 190 (Zhdanov) in Leningrad as yard number 324 on 13 August 1927. She was launched on 28 September 1930 and commissioned on 22 July 1932 into the Baltic Fleet. Construction was delayed by inadequate shipyard facilities, shortages of skilled labor and poor quality control by Soviet industry. Groza, and her sisters Smerch and Uragan, were sent to the White Sea via the newly opened White Sea–Baltic Canal on 26 July 1933 and Groza was assigned to the Northern Flotilla on 21 September. To lighten the ships for passage through shallows their armament was removed, along with much of the moveable deck equipment, and carried in barges that followed the ships. During the Winter War, Groza helped to transport the 104th Rifle Division to occupy Liinakhamari and provided fire support when Petsamo was occupied between 30 November and 2 December 1939. On 2–3 January 1940, the ship escorted two minelayers as they laid a minefield off Petsamo.

After the Axis invasion of the Soviet Union on 22 June 1941 (Operation Barbarossa), Groza and her sisters were quite active in mid-1941 providing fire support for Soviet troops defending the Zapadnaya Litsa River and the Rybachy Peninsula. On 6–7 July the ship was part of a force that landed two battalions of naval infantry that counter-attacked German forces driving on Murmansk during Operation Platinum Fox. She bombarded German positions with 36 rounds from her main guns on 1 January 1942. The ship received emergency repairs on 8–13 January and then spent the time between 24 March and 17 June under repair. Groza's crew claimed to have damaged a German U-boat on 10 September, but this has not been substantiated by post-war research.

Groza and Uragan were among the Soviet ships that met Convoy JW 53 as it approached Soviet waters in mid-February 1943 and arrived at Kola Inlet on 26 February. The ship was part of the escort for Convoy KB.23 from Murmansk to Archangel on 21–23 September. Six months later Groza escorted Convoy BK.2 as it sailed from Archangel to Murmansk on 5 February 1944. Six days later she is one of the Soviet escorts that rendezvoused with Convoy JW 64 on 11 February. Groza was modernized from 25 November 1943 until December 1944. The ship was converted to serve as a target ship on 12 November 1952 and was hulked as a barracks ship with the name of PRZ-51 on 25 February 1953.
