= Uragan-class guard ship =

Class of Soviet patrol and escort ships

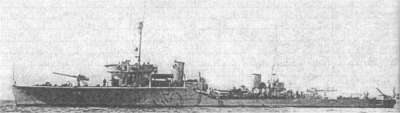

Class overview
- Name: Uragan
- Builders: Mykolaiv Black Sea shipyard(4) Peterburg North Shipyard(14)
- Operators: Soviet Navy
- Preceded by: N/A
- Succeeded by: Yastreb class
- Subclasses: Series I, II, III, IV
- Built: 1927–1938
- In service: 1930–1959
- In commission: 1930–1956
- Completed: 18
- Lost: 4

General characteristics (Type I as built)
- Class & type: Uragan-class guard ship
- Displacement: 490 t (480 long tons) (standard)
- Length: 71.5 m (234 ft 7 in)
- Beam: 7.4 m (24 ft 3 in)
- Draught: 2.95 m (9 ft 8 in)
- Installed power: 2 water-tube boilers; 5,700 shp (4,300 kW)
- Propulsion: 2 shafts; 2 geared steam turbines
- Speed: 21 knots (39 km/h; 24 mph) (trials)
- Range: 850 nmi (1,570 km; 980 mi) at 16 knots (30 km/h; 18 mph)
- Complement: 107–114 men (wartime)
- Armament: 2 × single 102 mm (4 in) guns; 2 × 7.62 mm (0.30 in) machine guns; 1 × triple 450 mm (17.7 in) torpedo tubes

Uragan-class guard ships (рус: Сторожевой корабль тип Ураган) were built for the Soviet Navy as small patrol and escort ships in four batches with slightly different specifications. Their official Soviet designations were Projects 2, 4 and 39, but they were nicknamed the "Bad Weather Flotilla" by Soviet sailors by virtue of their meteorological names. Eighteen were built from 1927 to 1938 and those of the Baltic and Northern Fleets participated in the 1939–1940 Winter War against Finland. The Uragan class served during World War II in all four of the Soviet Fleets, including Black Sea and Pacific Fleets. Four of those ships assigned to the Baltic Fleet were lost during the war, including two during the Soviet evacuation of Tallinn in late 1941.

The surviving ships of the Baltic Fleet participated in the Siege of Leningrad and the subsequent Leningrad–Novgorod offensive in 1944.

== Design and description ==
By the mid-1920s the Soviet Navy wanted to replace the few old Tsarist torpedo boats still in service. The initial requirement was based on that of the later batches of the German A-class torpedo boat for a ship not to exceed 300 metric tons (295 long tons), armed with two old 4-inch (102 mm) guns, three 450 mm (17.7 in) torpedo tubes and could carry mines as necessary to serve as fleet escorts and conduct torpedo attacks. It was to be powered by four Beardmore 6,000-shaft-horsepower (4,500 kW) diesel engines imported from the United Kingdom, but this plan was thwarted by Soviet financial support for the miners during the 1926 United Kingdom general strike. The preliminary designs had to be revised for steam propulsion, a task greatly complicated by the break in Soviet ship construction between 1917 and 1924 when no ships, naval or commercial, had been built and many experienced naval architects had either fled the country, found new jobs, or were politically suspect and not allowed to work. It proved impossible to work within the 300-ton limit with steam turbines and the tonnage limit was increased to 350 t (344 long tons) when the Navy approved the preliminary design on 26 November 1926. Detailed design of the ship and its power plant was assigned to the Zhandov Shipyard in Leningrad. They proposed two alternative steam power plants; one low-pressure design and the other with more pressure. The Navy decided against the high-pressure design and ordered studies evaluating "a three-shaft combined power plant with 2-shaft geared turbines plus 1-shaft diesel engine for cruising, diesel-electric, and diesel." These were rejected and the original two-shaft turbine power plant was selected with an output of 7,500 shp (5,600 kW) to reach a speed of 29 knots (54 km/h; 33 mph). At the same time it became clear that the new 350-ton limit was also inadequate and 400 t (394 long tons) would be needed. The twelfth design was approved on 23 June 1927 as the Project 1. The designation was changed to Project 2 in the 1930s when the failure of the design to reach its specified speed became apparent; the more prestigious Leningrad-class destroyer flotilla leaders then being designed became the Type 1.

=== General characteristics ===
The Uragan-class ships displaced 490 metric tons (480 long tons) at standard load and 633 t (623 long tons) at full load. They were 71.5 m (234 ft 7 in) long overall, had a beam of 7.4 m (24 ft 3 in) and a draft of 2.95 m (9 ft 8 in). The ships had 14 main watertight compartments and a double bottom only underneath the machinery and boiler rooms. The riveted hull used the typical Russian framing method of longitudinal framing for the bulk of the hull and transverse framing for the ends. The wartime crews of the ships numbered 107–114.

The Uragans proved to be heavier than designed and had only a meter (3 ft 4 in) of freeboard aft, which made their main deck almost permanently wet in any kind of sea. Their stability was also less than optimum as they were top-heavy with a metacentric height of only 0.6 m (2 ft) and they were almost 6 knots (11 km/h; 6.9 mph) slower than designed. In their intended role they "were complete failures – they were too slow for use as torpedo boats and of no value as ASW vessels because of their lack of depth-charge handling equipment and underwater detection devices".

=== Propulsion ===
The Uragan-class ships were powered by two Parsons geared steam turbines, each driving one propeller shaft using steam provided by a pair of three-drum boilers that operated at a pressure of 21 kg/cm^{2} (2,059 kPa; 299 psi) and a temperature of 270 °C (518 °F). The amount of power produced varied, and thus the performance, between each of the four sub-classes. The turbines of the Series I ships developed a total of 5,700 shaft horsepower (4,300 kW) and gave a speed in service of 21 knots (39 km/h; 24 mph), except for the two ships built at Zavod No. 198 (A. Marti) (Shtorm and Shkval) which produced only 4,620 shp (3,450 kW) and a speed of 18 kn (33 km/h; 21 mph). Maximum speeds reached during sea trials were considerably higher, but could not be sustained for very long and were not representative of the ship's performance in service. For example, the lead ship of Series I, Uragan, attained 26 knots (48 km/h; 30 mph) during her trials for a brief time. The Series II ships reached a speed of 23 knots (43 km/h; 26 mph) from 6,290 shp (4,690 kW) while the ships of the two later series were 1 knot (1.9 km/h; 1.2 mph) faster from 6,800 shp (5,100 kW). The ships carried a maximum of 116–119 metric tons (114–117 long tons) of fuel oil that gave the Series I ships a range of 850–900 nautical miles (1,570–1,670 km; 980–1,040 mi) at 16 knots (30 km/h; 18 mph); the Series II ships had a range of 1,200 nmi (2,200 km; 1,400 mi) at 14 knots (26 km/h; 16 mph) while the Series III and IV ships could steam for 960 nmi (1,780 km; 1,100 mi) at a speed of 18 knots (33 km/h; 21 mph).

A pair of 30 kW turbogenerators supplied the 115-volt electrical systems of the Uragans. A single 11 kW auxiliary electrical generator was fitted that was powered by an Izhora-type 20 hp (15 kW) kerosene engine.

=== Armament and fire control ===
The main armament of the Uragan-class guard ships consisted of a pair of Tsarist-era 60-caliber 102-millimeter (4 in) Pattern 1911 guns, one mount forward and aft of the superstructure. Each gun had a magazine with a capacity of two hundred rounds underneath it, although only the one on the forecastle had a hoist; the ammunition for the rear mount had to be hand-carried. The Series IV ships carried a pair of 100-millimeter (3.9 in) B-24BM guns in lieu of the 102 mm guns.

Anti-aircraft defense was intended to be provided by four single 37-millimeter (1.5 in) 11-K AA guns, these were modified versions of the British 2-pounder (40 mm (1.6 in)) guns, but deteriorating relations with the United Kingdom prevented the Soviets from buying any of these weapons. The first Series I ships were initially completed without any anti-aircraft armament, but a pair of 7.62-millimeter (0.3 in) Maxim machine guns were fitted shortly afterwards.

A rotating triple mount for 450 mm (17.7 in) torpedoes was fitted between the funnels. Up to 20 mines or depth charges could be carried using mine rails mounted on the main deck. No sonar was fitted so dropping depth charges was largely an act of futility. Two K-1 minesweeping paravanes were fitted on the main deck after the design was finalized.

One 2-meter (6 ft 7 in) rangefinder was mounted above the open bridge and a 1-meter (3 ft 3 in) searchlight was fitted on a small platform abaft the rear funnel.

== Construction ==
A total of eighteen Uragan-class guard ships were planned, but Soviet shipbuilding capacity was inadequate to begin them all at once. Series I was intended as a group of six to be built at the Zhandov Shipyard in Leningrad and Series II was to consist of two ships constructed at the Marti Shipyard in Nikolayev to that shipyard's variant of the basic design which received the designation of Project 4. The construction of this class was to prove to be a series of problems including design flaws, lack of shipbuilding capacity and a poorly designed and built power plant that was delivered two years after the first ships were launched.

Prefabrication of the hulls began even before the final design was approved and proved to be a major mistake as the strength analysis of the longitudinal joints in the hull proved to be severely flawed and construction was suspended until the end of November 1927 when new blueprints were issued. No slipways were available at the Zhandov Yard until three were finished in May 1928, having only begun construction at the end of 1927, and the assembly of the hulls of the first three Series I ships began shortly afterwards. The other three slipways were completed by July and the other three ships began assembly as the slipways were finished. The hull of Uragan was completed within ten weeks after the keel was laid, although the other ships were built a more normal pace. "Possibly she was built to gain as much experience as possible."

Although Uragan was launched on 4 September 1928 she didn't receive her power plant for another almost another two years. The ability of Soviet industry to deliver precision machinery like turbine gears was greatly overestimated by the Navy and the gears for the first eight ships had to be imported from Germany to have any chance of completion in a timely manner. The first boiler design proved unsatisfactory during preliminary testing in late 1928 and early 1929 and a second design was tested later in 1929 and into 1930. Even this new design wasn't entirely satisfactory as it proved to be impossible to force its output above the specified limits, but it was approved for use in the Uragans when an improved model would have taken at least another year put into production.

Uragan was accepted on 16 December 1930 for sea trials. She proved to be heavier than estimated and had only a 1 metre (3 ft 3 in) of freeboard aft, which made her main deck very wet in almost any kind of moderate sea. She was also top-heavy which reduced her stability and sea-keeping abilities. She was proved capable of 26.5 knots (49.1 km/h; 30.5 mph) during her trials, but 23 knots (43 km/h; 26 mph) was her normal top speed. This was primarily because her boilers had been designed only deliver enough steam for her turbines, leaving nothing was in reserve to power her steam-driven auxiliary machinery. As her turbines drew 5–6% more steam than originally designed and her auxiliary machinery had to be powered, there simply was not enough steam to power her turbines at their designed output. For trials they produced 7,200 shp (5,400 kW), but a more realistic output was 6,400 shp (4,800 kW) in normal use. Uragan was finally commissioned on 12 September 1931, two years after her intended delivery date, becoming the first Soviet-built surface warship.

After Uragan was commissioned four more ships were laid down for service in the Far East, two each at Leningrad and Nikolayev. They were built in sections and transported by the end of 1933 to the Dalzavod Shipyard in Vladivostok for assembly. The four Series III ships were laid down in 1934, three at the Zhandov Yard and one at the Marti Yard. One ship from each shipyard were sent to the Far East. Sources differ if these ships were simply repeats of the Series I ships or if they had been improved in detail and known as Project 39. These changes were fairly minor, other than some improvements to the turbines that it was hoped would increase speed by a knot or so. The two ships of Series IV definitely had the improvements and were built at Leningrad for service with the Baltic Fleet.

=== Modifications ===
The minesweeping paravanes were fitted on each ship shortly after completion and further contributed to their overweight problem. By the mid-1930s two semi-automatic 45 mm anti-aircraft gun (21-K) and three or four 12.7 mm DShK AA machine guns were being fitted. Normally the 45 mm guns were mounted fore and aft of the rear 4 inch gun with two machine guns flanking the latter, although some ships mounted one 45 mm gun in front of the forward 4-inch gun with one machine gun on each side of the bridge. As each ship was refitted for the first time its bridge was enclosed. The rear mast was removed during the war.

Their anti-aircraft armament was further increased as a result of lessons learned during the Winter War. Most ships in European waters received two single mounts for the fully automatic 37 mm AA gun before Operation Barbarossa, one on each side of the bridge. Sometimes these replaced the 45 mm guns. During the war gun shields were added to the 4-inch guns from 1942 and most ships exchanged one 45 mm for a 37 mm gun and an extra machine gun or two. Smerch landed both of her 4-inch guns and received one new B-24 gun on the forecastle with one 76.2 mm (3 in) anti-aircraft gun mounted in front of it and three 76.2 mm AA guns replaced the rear 4-inch gun. All of these additions did nothing to improve their stability and top-weight problems.

== Ships ==
Construction data
Series I (Project 2)
Ship	Builder	Laid down	Launched	Completed	Fate
Uragan (Ураган – Hurricane)	Zhdanov, Leningrad	13 August 1927	4 September 1928	12 September 1931	Broken-up 1959
Taifun (Тайфун – Typhoon)	Zhdanov, Leningrad	13 August 1927	1 June 1929	14 September 1931	Stricken 1959
Smerch (Смерч – Whirlwind)	Zhdanov, Leningrad	13 August 1927	22 July 1929	13 September 1932	Sunk 8 December 1942, but later raised
Tsiklon (Циклон – Cyclone)	Zhdanov, Leningrad	13 August 1927	28 November 1929	3 July 1932	Sunk 28 August 1941
Vikhr (Вихрь – Vortex)	Zhdanov, Leningrad	13 August 1927	12 October 1930	12 September 1932	Sunk 21 September 1941, but later raised
Groza (Гроза – Thunderstorm)	Zhdanov, Leningrad	13 August 1927	22 September 1930	22 July 1932	Scrapped 1959
Shkval (Шквал – Squall)	Zavod 198 (A. Marti), Nikolaev	24 September 1927	1 July 1929	13 October 1932	Stricken 1959
Shtorm (Шторм – Storm)	Zavod 198 (A. Marti), Nikolaev	24 September 1927	1 September 1929	5 March 1932	Stricken 1959
Series II (Project 4)
Metel (Метель – Driftstorm)	Zavod 198 (A. Marti), Nikolayev; Dalzavod, Vladivostok	18 December 1931	15 June 1934	18 November 1934	Training ship 1945
V'yuga (Вьюга – Snowblast)	Zavod 198 (A. Marti), Nikolayev; Dalzavod, Vladivostok	26 December 1931	5 July 1934	18 November 1934	Training ship 1945
Buran (Буран – Blizzard)	Zavod 198 (A. Marti), Nikolayev; Dalzavod, Vladivostok	22 April 1932	27 September 1934	7 October 1935	Stricken 1959
Grom (Гром – Thunder)	Zavod 198 (A. Marti), Nikolayev; Dalzavod, Vladivostok	17 June 1932	22 September 1934	22 July 1935	Stricken 1959
Series III (Project 2)
Burya (Буря – Gale)	Zhdanov, Leningrad	June 1934	November 1935	27 October 1936	sunk 24 August 1942
Purga (Пурга – Snowstorm)	Zhdanov, Leningrad	June 1934	November 1935	4 September 1936	Sunk 1 September 1942, but later raised
Molniya (Молния – Lightning)	Zhdanov, Leningrad; Dalzavod, Vladisvostok	23 March 1934	24 November 1934	20 September 1936	Stricken 1959
Zarnitsa (Зарница – Distance Lightning)	Zhdanov, Leningrad; Dalzavod, Vladisvostok	21 March 1934	6 November 1934	6 November 1936	Stricken 1959
Series IV (Project 39)
Sneg (Снег – Snow)	Zhdanov, Leningrad	27 April 1935	14 July 1936	25 September 1938	sunk 28 August 1941
Tucha (Туча – Thundercloud)	Zhdanov, Leningrad	27 April 1935	20 October 1936	25 September 1938	Stricken 1959

== History ==
Uragan, Smerch and Groza were sent to the Northern Flotilla via the newly opened White Sea–Baltic Canal in 1933. To lighten the ships for passage through shallows their armament was removed, along with much of the moveable deck equipment, and carried in barges that followed the ships. During the Lake Khasan border incident with the Japanese in mid-1938 Metel carried wounded to Vladivostok and escorted three convoys carrying troops and supplied to Posyet Bay, fortunately without interference by the Imperial Japanese Navy.

As part of the effort to pressure the Baltic states into accepting Soviet troops they staged an incident in Narva Bay by sinking the oil tanker Metallist on 26 September 1939. The sinking was then blamed on the Polish submarine Orzeł which, however, was en route to the United Kingdom at the time. "According to Finnish information (based on statements made by a Soviet prisoner of war) Metallist was sunk by Tucha (with loss of life) after being missed by the submarine Shch 303 to give the Soviets an excuse to claim rights to defend Estonian waters." The Estonians capitulated to Soviet demands a few days later.

During the Winter War Burya, Vikhr, Sneg and Purga provided fire support as the Soviets conducted landings on the small Finnish-held islands in the Gulf of Finland. Groza helped to transport the 104th Rifle Division to occupy Liinakhamari and provided fire support when Petsamo was occupied between 30 November and 2 December 1939.

=== World War II ===
==== Northern Fleet ====
When the Germans invaded Uragan was laid up pending replacement parts for her turbines from Leningrad. They did not arrive before the city was cut off and she therefore remained laid up until late 1944 after Leningrad had been liberated. Her sisters were quite active early in the campaign providing fire support for Soviet troops defending the Zapadnaya Litsa River and the Rybachy Peninsula. Things were much quieter for most of the rest of the war although Smerch was sunk while on trials after a refit on 8 December 1942. However, she was later raised and repaired although it took until Autumn 1944 before she was recommissioned. Groza was laid up pending repairs from 1943 until 1945.

==== Baltic Fleet ====
Sneg and Tucha accompanied a force of seven destroyers in a failed attempt to intercept a German convoy off the Daugava River estuary on 13 July 1941. Burya, Sneg and Tsiklon were assigned to the rear guard during the Soviet evacuation of Tallinn and laid mines in the harbor approaches before departing: their mines (barrage 26-A) sank the Finnish coastal defence ship Ilmarinen, during Operation Nordwind, scoring one of the best successes of the Soviet Navy against an enemy major warship. However, Sneg and Tsiklon hit mines themselves in the Axis-laid minefield off Cape Juminda and sink during the night of 28–29 August. Vikhr was sunk by German bombers on 21 September and Taifun badly damaged two days later. Purga was sunk in Lake Ladoga by German bombers on 1 September 1942, but she was raised in 1943 and cannibalized to repair Vikhr, but she herself was eventually repaired and returned to service in 1944. Burya ran into an Axis minefield when attempting to bombard Finnish positions on Suursaari Island and was sunk on 24 August 1942.

==== Black Sea Fleet ====
Shtorm had been laid up for repairs to her engines at Sevastopol since March 1939 and the repairs were not fully complete by 30 November 1941 when the Germans began their initial attacks on the city. Shtorm and Shkval escorted the tugs evacuating all of the ships either damaged or under repair to ports in the Caucasus and returned a number of times escorting convoys carrying men and material for the defense of Sevastopol. Shtorm provided gunfire support during the Kerch–Feodosiya Operation on 29 December 1941. Both ships ferried troops and supplies to Novorossiysk and Tuapse during 1942 as well evacuating the wounded. Shtorm's refit was finally completed in June 1942. On 18 December 1942, Shtorm, supported by the destroyer Nezamozhnik, shelled the Axis naval base at Feodosiya, where they hit and sank a German tugboat.

Shtorm and Shkval supported Soviet landings near Novorossiysk during 1943 with gunfire and supplies, but they were both worn-out by the end of the year. Shtorm was active again in 1944 (escort duty) but was torpedoed by the German submarine U-9, however she did not sink and was towed into port.

==== Pacific Fleet ====
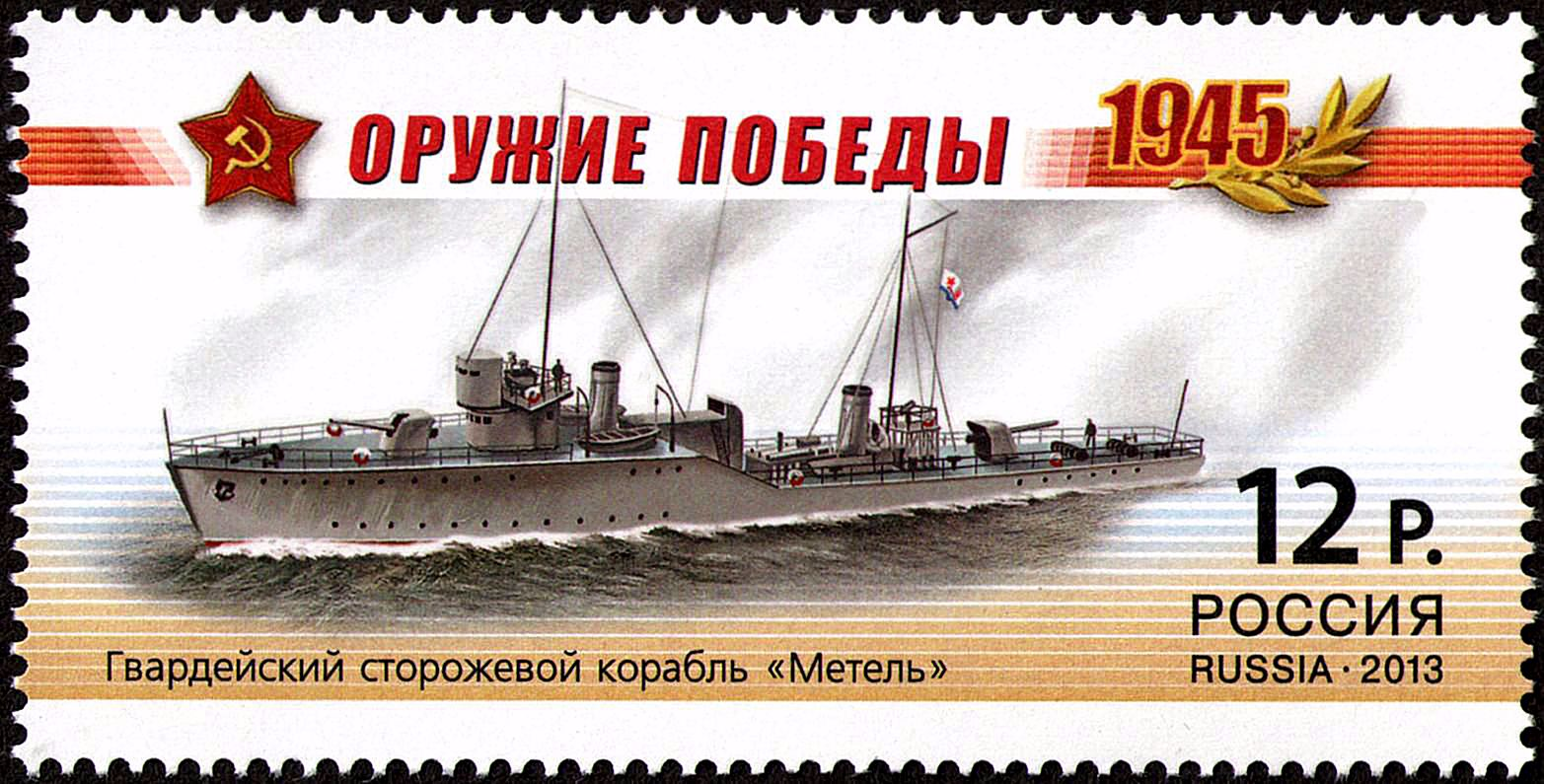
Metel on a Russian postage stamp, 2013

During the Soviet invasion of Manchuria in August 1945 V'yuga and Metel supported amphibious operations by the 25th Army along the eastern coast of Korea while Zarnitsa supported the invasion of South Sakhalin.

=== Postwar ===
Little is known about the detailed history of the Uragans after the end of the war although it appears that most became training ships shortly afterwards. Smerch was turned over to DOSAAF in 1950 as a training ship and transferred to the Caspian Sea in 1951. It appears that most were disposed of during the mid to late 1950s although sources differ and lack details.
