= Maltese patrol boat P29 =

Ship scuttled as dive site off Malta

Coordinates: 35°59′16″N 14°19′43″E

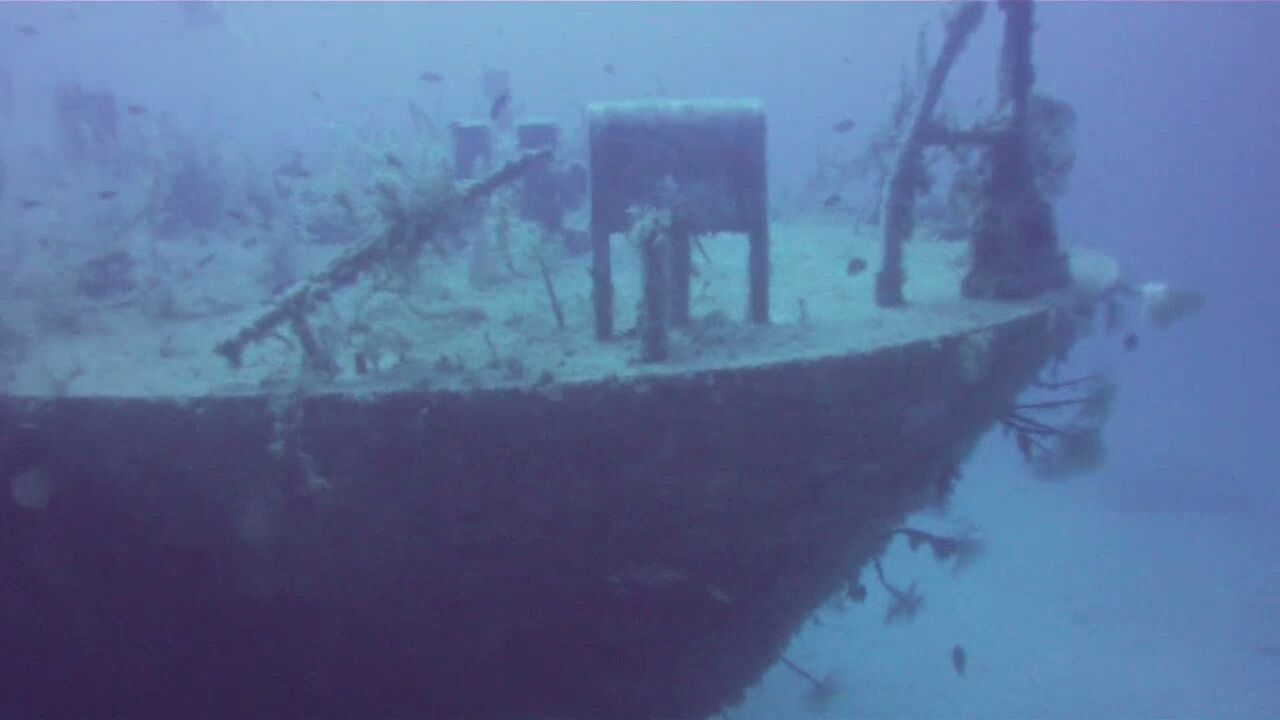
- The wreck of P29

History

East Germany
- Name: Boltenhagen
- Builder: Peenewerft shipyard
- Laid down: 8 October 1969
- Launched: 22 May 1970
- Commissioned: 19 September 1970
- Decommissioned: 1990
- Identification: Hull number: GS09
- Fate: Transferred to Germany, 1990

Germany
- Name: Boltenhagen
- Acquired: 1990
- Decommissioned: 30 June 1996
- Identification: Hull number: BG31
- Fate: Sold to Malta, 1997

Malta
- Name: P29
- Acquired: 24 July 1997
- Decommissioned: 2004
- Fate: Scuttled as artificial dive site, 14 August 2007

General characteristics
- Class & type: Kondor I-class minesweeper
- Displacement: 361 tons
- Length: 51.98 m (170 ft 6 in)
- Beam: 7.12 m (23 ft 4 in)
- Draught: 2.3 m (7 ft 7 in)
- Propulsion: MD 40 diesel engines
- Speed: 20 knots (37 km/h; 23 mph)
- Complement: 20
- Armament: 1 × quad 14.5 mm gun

Boltenhagen (GS09) was a Kondor I-class minesweeper built in East Germany. After the Volksmarine was disbanded just before the reunification of Germany, she was sold to Malta in 1997 and renamed P29 and was used as a patrol boat. After being decommissioned, she was scuttled as a dive site in 2007 off Ċirkewwa.

== History ==
=== East Germany ===
The minesweeper was laid down on 8 October 1969 at Peenewerft shipyard in Wolgast. She was launched on 22 May 1970 and commissioned on 19 September of that same year. She was the eighteenth ship of the Kondor I class to be built, and was named Boltenhagen after the town of the same name in Rostock. She was used to patrol the river banks between East and West Germany, as well as a minesweeper.

=== Germany ===
After the reunification of Germany, the minesweeper was decommissioned along with most of the Kondor I class vessels. However, it was then used as a patrol vessel by the German Federal Coast Guard. The name Boltenhagen was retained but she was given the pennant number BG31. The ship's guns were dismantled, the radio and radar equipment was changed, and it was repainted. BG31, the last Kondor I class in the German Coast Guard, was decommissioned on 30 June 1996.

=== Malta ===
The former minesweeper was then purchased by Malta on 24 July 1997 and was given the pennant number P29. She rejoined her sister ships Ueckermünde and Pasewalk which were purchased by Malta back in 1992 and were given the pennant numbers P30 and P31. P29 became a patrol boat within the Offshore Command of the Maritime Squadron of the Armed Forces of Malta. Since the former minesweepers were purchased unarmed, some light armament was then added by the AFM.

P29 was then used to secure the Maltese coast against smuggling and border control operations. She was decommissioned in 2004 and was bought by the Malta Tourism Authority in September 2005. She was cleaned and then was scuttled on 14 August 2007 off the port of Ċirkewwa to serve as a diving site and artificial reef.

== Wreck ==
The wreck now lies at a depth of around 35 metres (115 ft) but the entire dive may be done at 25 metres (82 ft). The highest point is situated only 12 metres (39 ft) below the surface. The site is located close to the wreck of the MV Rozi, which was scuttled in 1992. Since it was quite recently sunk compared to MV Rozi and other wreck sites in Malta, it requires some time to attract a good amount of marine life inside and around it. However, since its sinking, Alicia mirabilis, squid, flying gurnards and rays have already started settling on the former patrol boat.

In 2013, P29 was listed among the "10 Most Incredible Sunken Ships on Earth" by Amazing Beautiful World.

Images of the wreck of P29

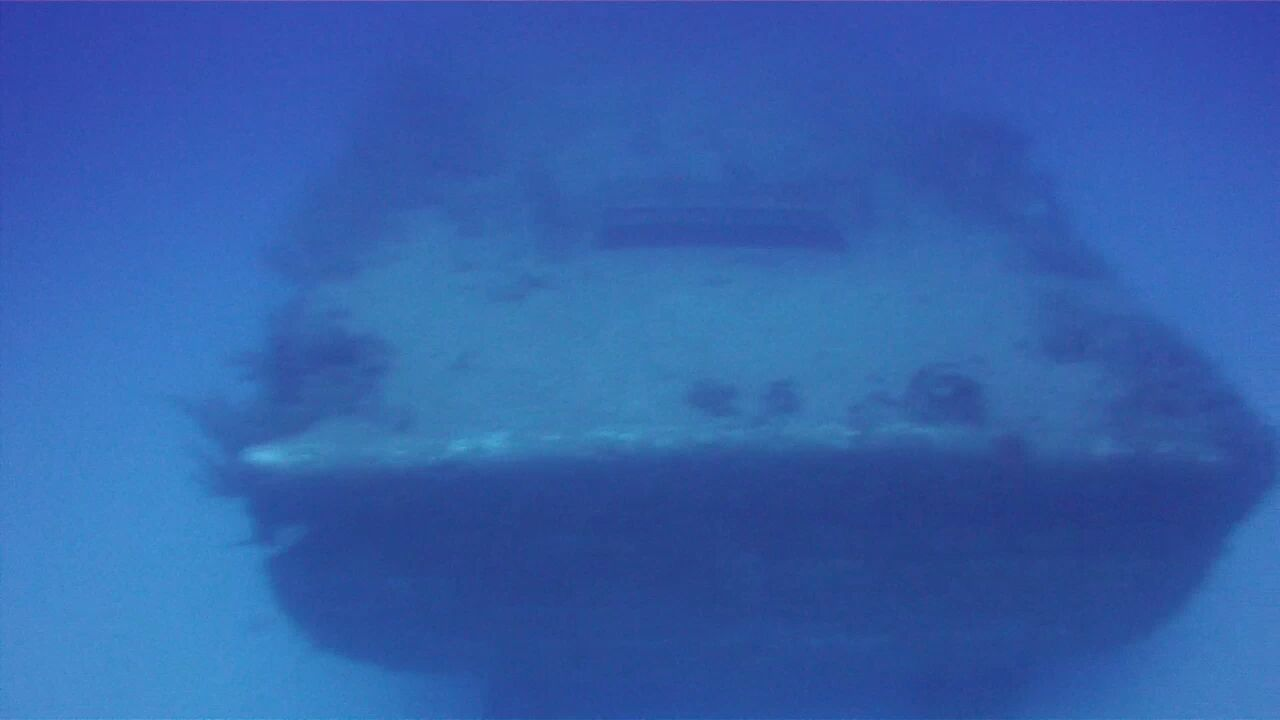
The stern

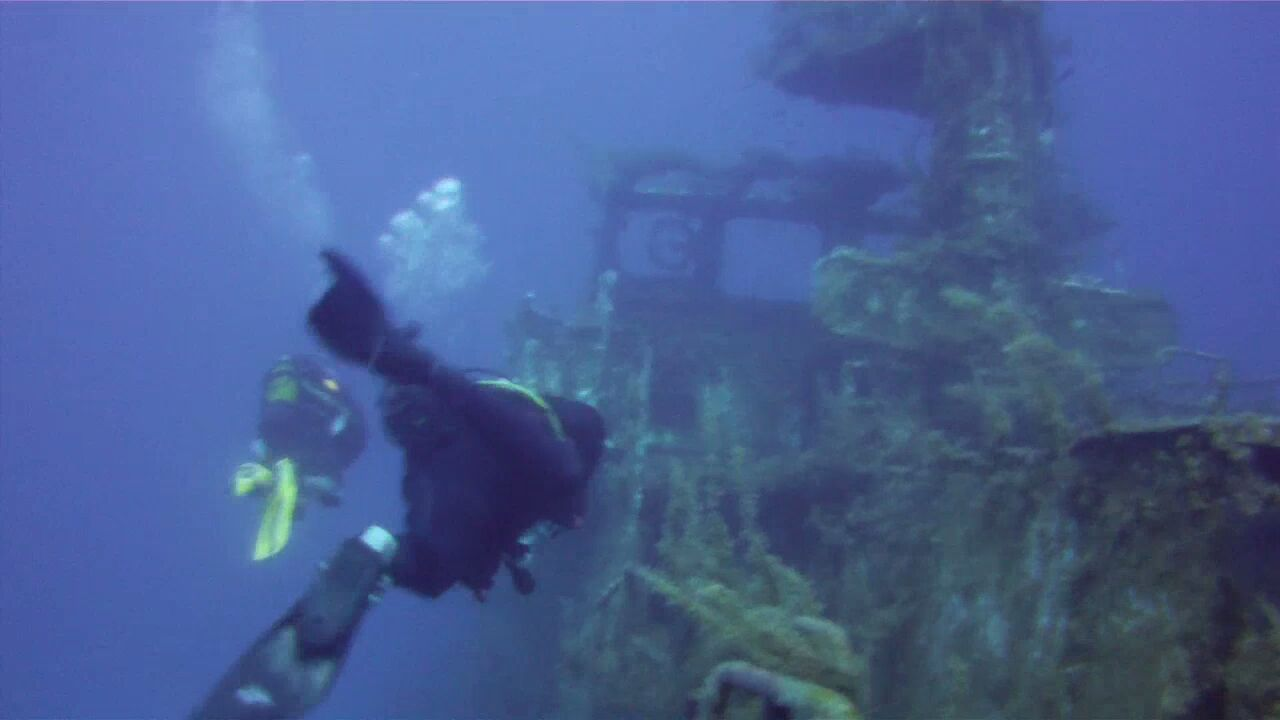
The superstructure

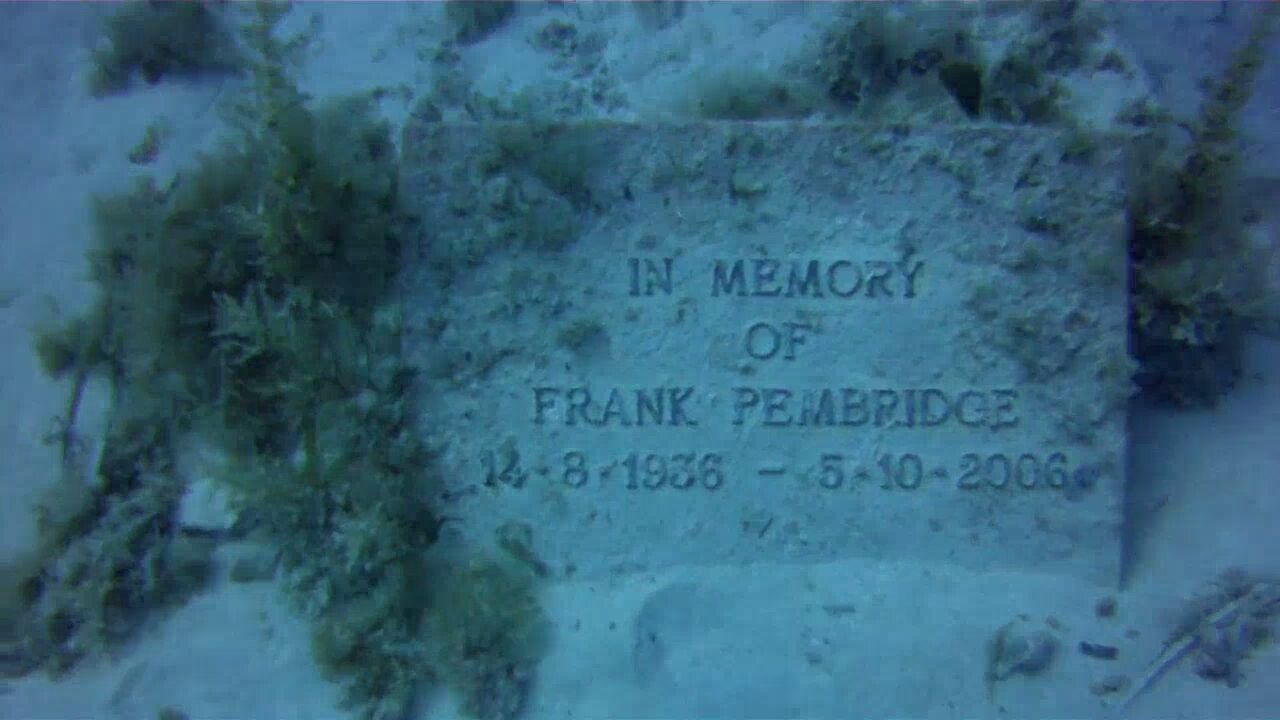
Commemorative plaque to Frank Pembridge

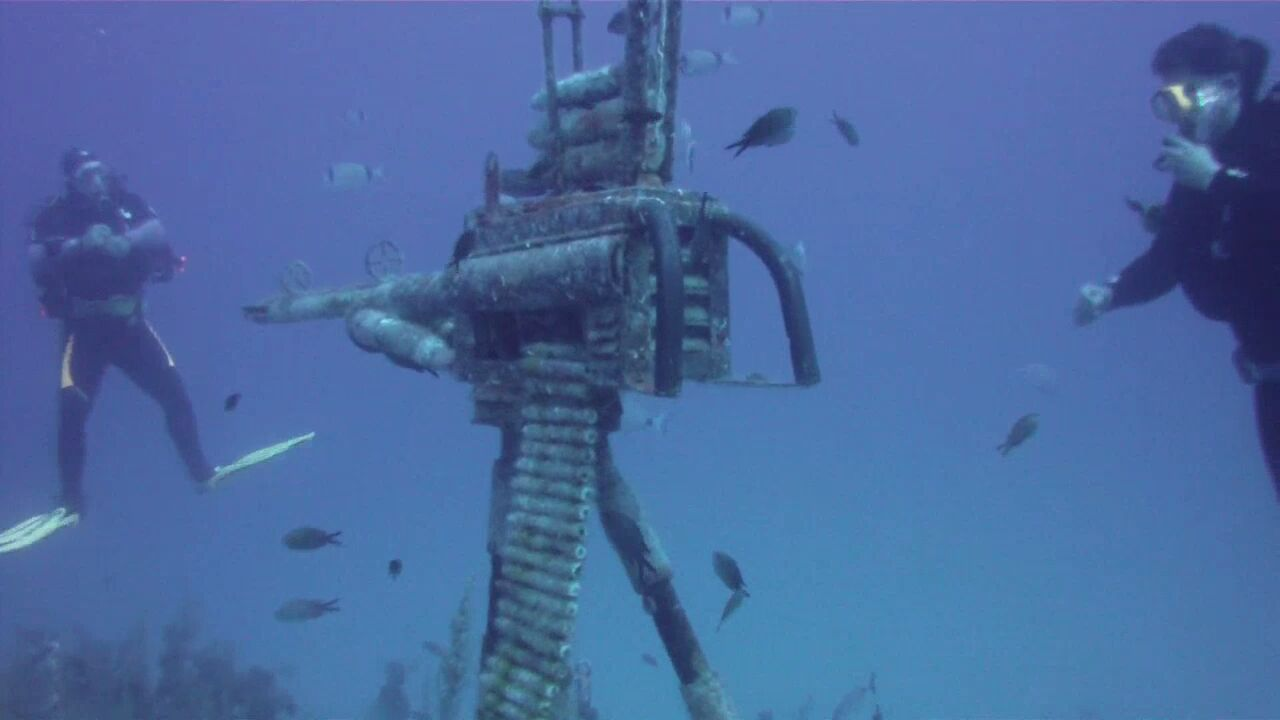
Mock-up machine gun

== See also ==
- Maltese patrol boat P31 – Minesweeper/patrol boat scuttled for use as a recreational dive site
