= KRI Kelabang =

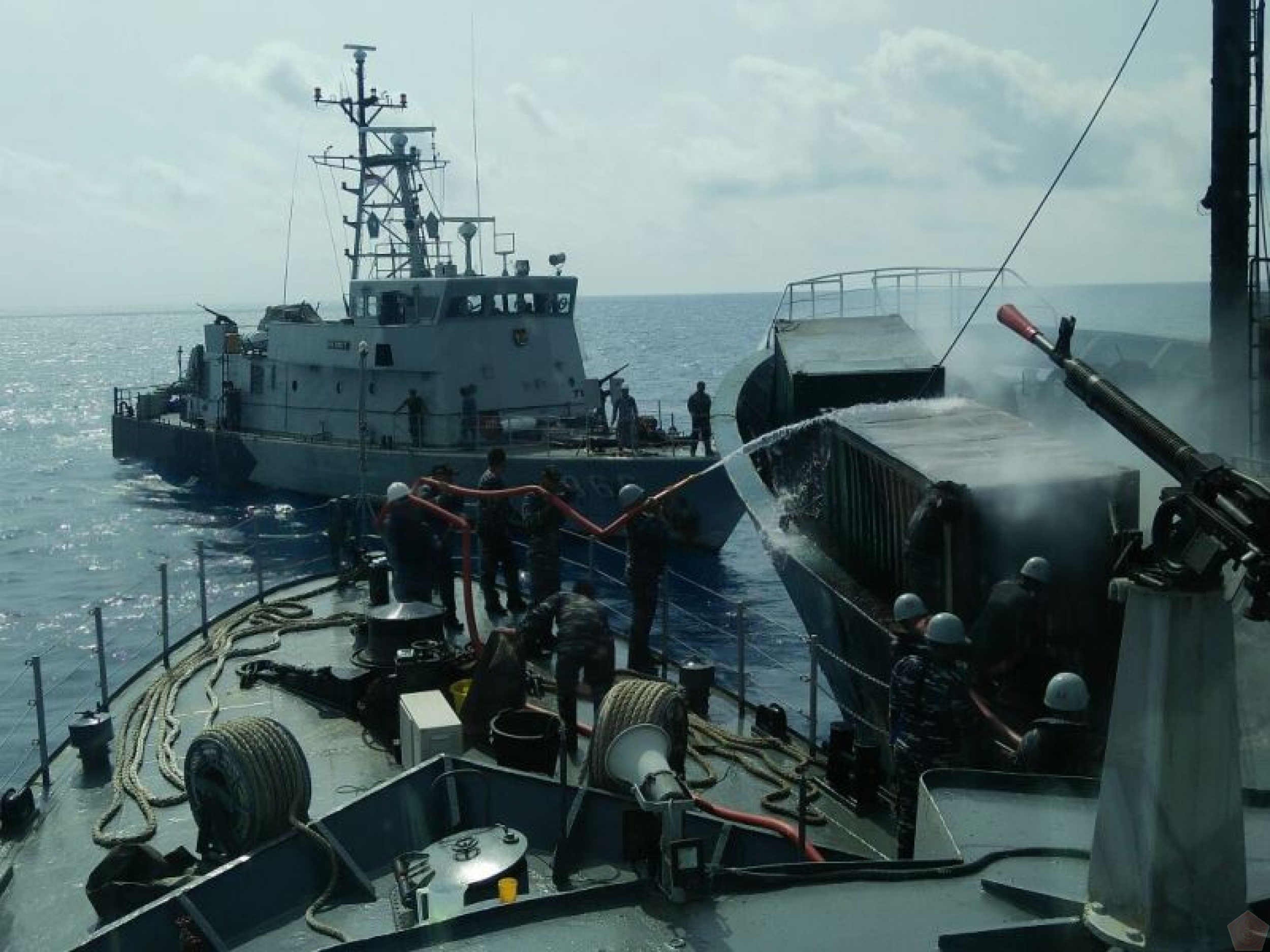
- KRI Kelabang (862) and KRI Cucut (866)

History

East Germany
- Name: Zerbst
- Namesake: Zerbst
- Builder: VEB Peenewerft, Wolgast, Germany
- Launched: 1972
- Commissioned: 1972
- Decommissioned: 1990
- Identification: Pennant number: 335
- Fate: Sold to Indonesian Navy, 1995

Indonesia
- Name: Kelabang
- Namesake: Kelabang
- Commissioned: 1995
- Identification: Pennant number: 862
- Motto: Bretya Jaladhi Berawa; (Sanskrit, lit. 'Valiant Sea Warrior')
- Status: In active service

General characteristics
- Class & type: Kondor II-class minesweeper
- Displacement: 479 tons
- Length: 56.78 m (186 ft 3 in)
- Beam: 7.73 m (25 ft 4 in)
- Draft: 2.46 m (8 ft 1 in)
- Propulsion: 2 x diesel 2 shaft, 4,400 bhp (3,300 kW)
- Speed: 18 knots (33 km/h; 21 mph)
- Sensors & processing systems: sonar MG-11/Tamir-II
- Armament: 2 × 25 mm 2M3 twin-barrel cannons; 12.7 mm heavy machine guns

KRI Kelabang (826), formerly known as KRI Pulau Rondo (725), is a Kondor II-class minesweeper originally built in East Germany and operated by the Volksmarine under the name Zerbst (335). After the dissolution of the Volksmarine prior to German reunification, the vessel was acquired by the Indonesian Navy in 1995 and was initially renamed Pulau Rondo before being renamed once more to Kelabang . Kelabang is one of the Indonesian Navy warships that serves under the Patrol Ship Unit of II Main Naval Base. This vessel is utilized to support various operational activities within the area of responsibility of II Main Naval Base, which extends from the waters of Sibolga to Bengkulu. The name Kelabang had been used previously, but without a hull number.

== History ==
The minesweeper was constructed at the Peenewerft shipyard in Wolgast and launched in 1972, entering service with the Volksmarine in the same year. It was the fifteenth ship built under the Kondor II class, also known as Project 89.2, and was named Zerbst, after a town in the district of Anhalt-Bitterfeld, in Saxony-Anhalt, East Germany.

After the dissolution of the Volksmarine, the ship and other Kondor-class vessels were considered for decommissioning in 1990.

During the period of 1992–1994, the Indonesian Navy purchased 39 vessels from the former East Germany, including nine Kondor-class ships designed for minesweeping, one of which was the Zerbst, later renamed KRI Pulau Rondo (725).

However, after their mine-hunting equipment failed, Pulau Rondo was repurposed as a patrol vessel and renamed KRI Kelabang (826).
