= Maltese patrol boat P31 =

Minesweeper/patrol boat scuttled for use as a recreational dive site

Coordinates: 36°01′N 14°20′E

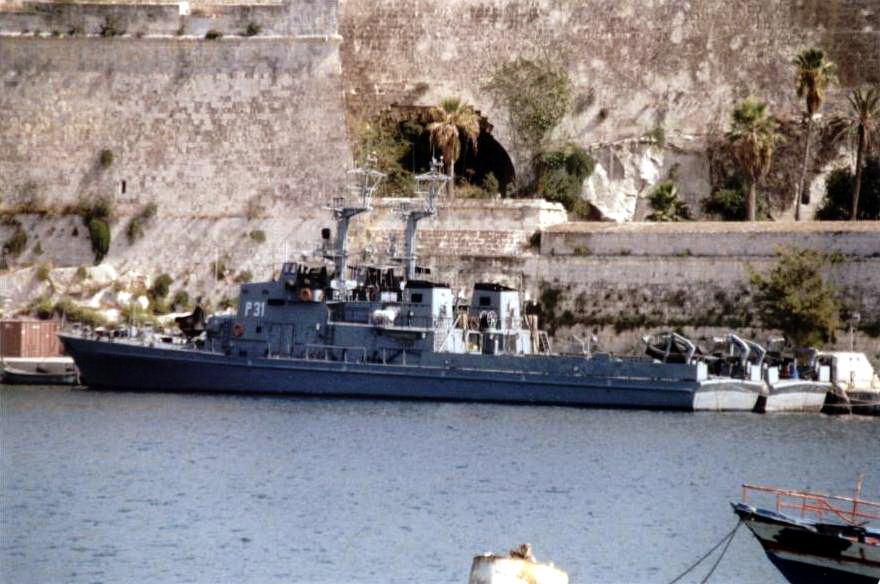
- Patrol boat P31 at Hay Wharf, Floriana

History

East Germany
- Name: Pasewalk
- Builder: Peenewerft shipyard
- Laid down: 12 December 1968
- Launched: 18 June 1969
- Commissioned: 18 October 1969
- Decommissioned: 1990
- Identification: GS05
- Fate: Sold to Malta, 1992.

Malta
- Name: P31
- Acquired: 1 July 1992
- Decommissioned: 2004
- Fate: Scuttled as artificial dive site, 25 August 2009

General characteristics
- Class & type: Kondor I-class minesweeper
- Displacement: 361 tons
- Length: 51.98 m (170 ft 6 in)
- Beam: 7.12 m (23 ft 4 in)
- Draft: 2.3 m (7 ft 7 in)
- Propulsion: MD 40 diesel engines
- Speed: 20 knots (37 km/h; 23 mph)
- Complement: 20
- Armament: 1 × quad 14.5 mm gun

Pasewalk (GS05) was a Kondor I-class minesweeper built in East Germany. After the Volksmarine was disbanded just before the reunification of Germany, she was sold to Malta in 1992 and renamed P31 and was used as a patrol boat. After being decommissioned, she was scuttled as a dive site in 2009 off Comino.

== History ==
=== East Germany ===
The minesweeper was laid down on 12 December 1968 at Peenewerft shipyard in Wolgast. She was launched on 18 June 1969 and commissioned on 18 October of that same year. She was the eighth ship to be built within the Kondor I class, and was named Pasewalk after the town of the same name in Mecklenburg-West Pomerania federated state in northern Germany. She was used to patrol the river banks between East and West Germany, as well as a minesweeper.

After the Volksmarine was disbanded, she and the other Kondor I-class vessels were deemed too obsolete to join the German Navy, so she was decommissioned in 1990. Her armaments were removed.

=== Malta ===
The unarmed minesweeper was then purchased by Malta on 1 July 1992 along with her sister ship Ueckermünde, and they were given the pennant numbers P30 and P31. P31 became a patrol boat within the Offshore Command of the Maritime Squadron of the Armed Forces of Malta. A third sister ship, Boltenhagen, was purchased in 1997 and was given the pennant number P29. Since the former minesweepers were purchased unarmed, some light armament was then added by the AFM.

P31 was then used to secure the Maltese coast against smuggling and border control operations. Most notably was the rescue of 251 illegal immigrants from their 20-metre (66 ft) boat which was sinking 44 miles (71 km) to the south of Malta in over force 6 winds.

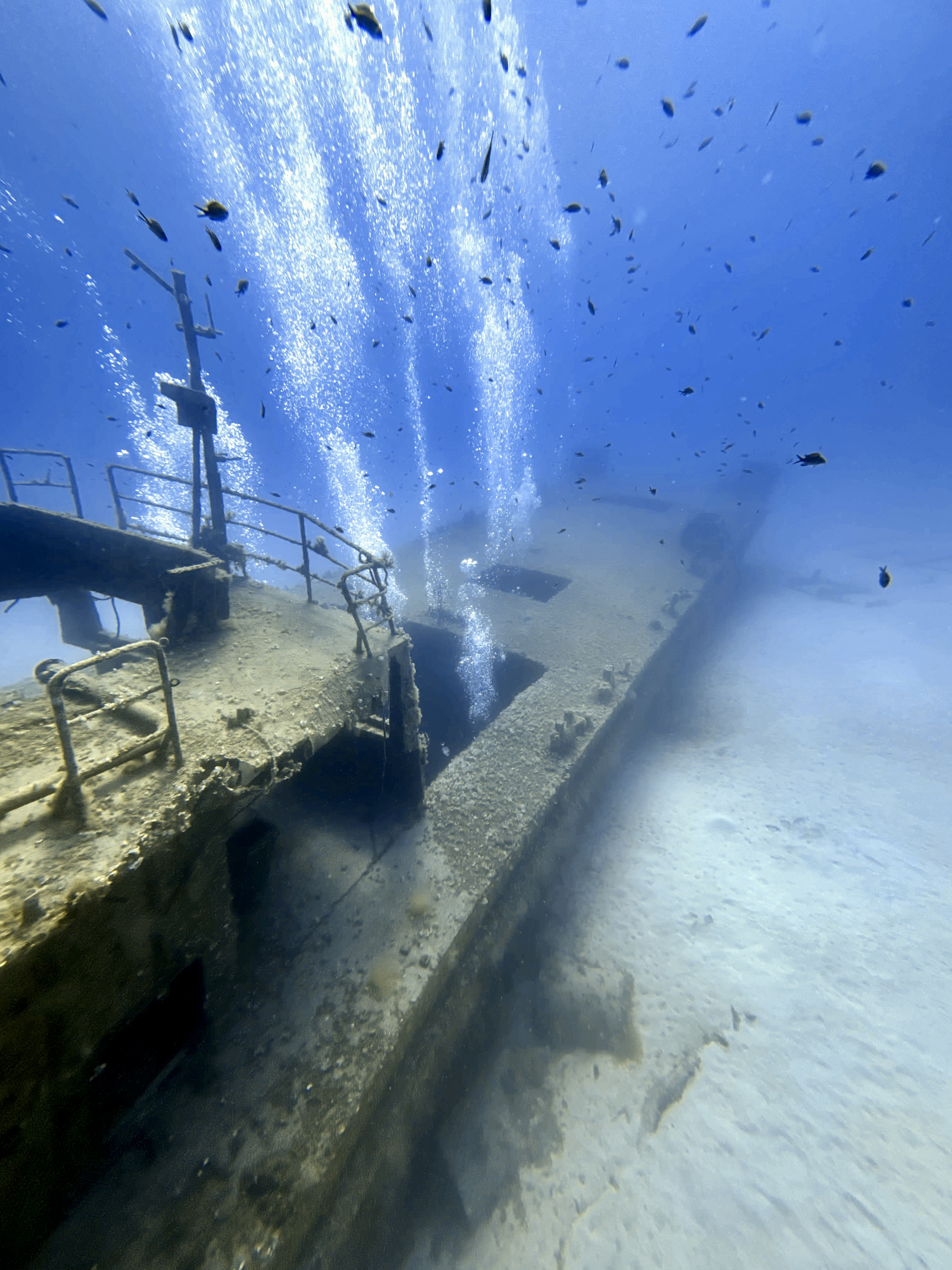
the port side of the wreck (2025)

P31 was decommissioned in 2004 and bought by the Malta Tourism Authority. She was cleaned and then was scuttled on 25 August 2009 off the Maltese island of Comino at a depth of 18 metres (59 ft) to serve as a diving site and artificial reef. The wreck now lies on bare sand, and it is located close but not on the important sea grass beds.

== See also ==
- Maltese patrol boat P29
- Interactive 3D photogrammetric model of the P31 created in 2018
