= MV Rozi =

Tugboat scuttled as a dive site off Malta

Coordinates: 35°59′16″N 14°19′43″E

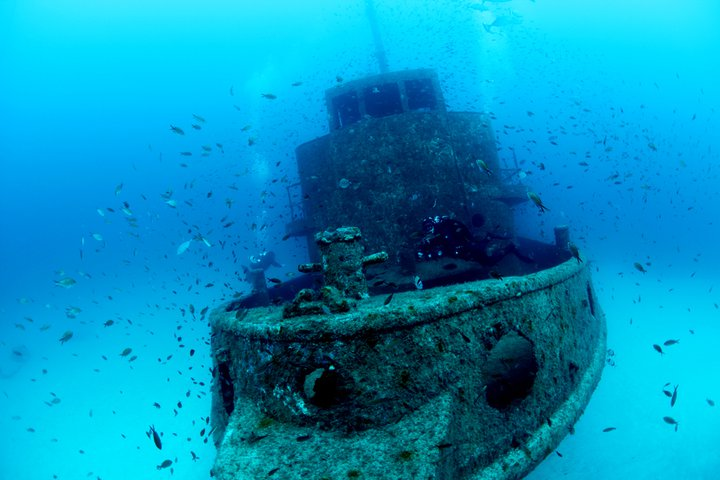
- Wreck of the Rozi

History
- Name: Rossmore (1958–1969); Rossgarth (1969–1981); Rozi (1981–1992)
- Owner: Johnson Warren Lines Ltd (1958–1969); Rea Towing Company (1969–1972); Malta Ship Towage Ltd (1972–1981); Tug Malta (1981–1992); Captain Morgan Cruises (1992)
- Port of registry: (United Kingdom) Liverpool (1958-1972); (Malta) Valletta (1972-1992)
- Builder: Charles Hill & Sons Ltd, Bristol
- Launched: 1958
- Identification: IMO number: 5300778
- Fate: Scuttled as an artificial dive site, 1992.

General characteristics
- Type: Tugboat
- Length: 40 metres (130 ft)

MV Rozi was a tugboat, built in Bristol in 1958. She was originally called Rossmore, and was later renamed Rossgarth. She was sold to Tug Malta in 1981 as the Rozi and operated in the Grand Harbour. After being decommissioned, in 1992 she was scuttled off Ċirkewwa as an artificial reef. It is now one of the most popular dive sites in Malta.

== History ==
MV Rozi was built in Bristol in 1958 by Charles Hill & Sons Ltd, for Warren Johnston Lines Ltd of Liverpool. Her original name was Rossmore. In 1969 she was sold to Rea Towing Company and renamed Rossgarth. In 1972 she was sold to Mifsud Brothers Ltd, and operated for Malta Ship Towage Ltd, retaining its name. She left Liverpool and began her career in Malta.

The tugboat was sold to Tug Malta in 1981 and was renamed Rozi. After many years operating in Grand Harbour, she was decommissioned and sold to Captain Morgan Cruises. They scuttled the tugboat off Ċirkewwa in September 1992 for their Underwater Safari Tours. These tours no longer operate, but the site is now a popular dive site which attracts hundreds of divers from around the world.

== Dive site ==
The wreck of the Rozi lies upright on a sandy bottom, at a depth of 36 metres (118 ft). It is intact except for its engines and propeller. The wreck is full of marine life, including sea breams, scorpionfish, rainbow wrasses and cardinal fish.

The site is easily accessible from the nearby Ċirkewwa Harbour and is located close to the wreck of the patrol boat P29.
