= Kondor-class minesweeper =

East German class of minesweepers

Kondor I class
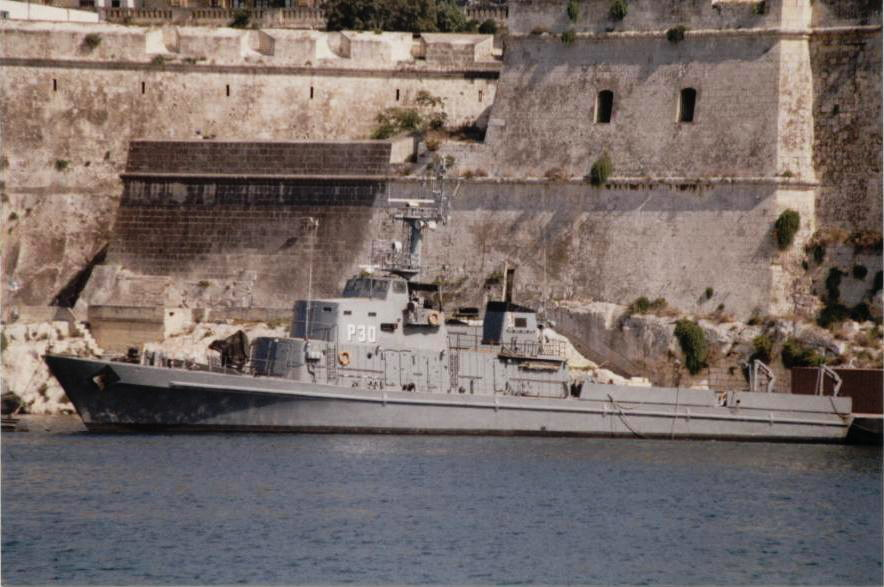
- Ueckermünde (GS01) in Malta service as P30

Class overview
- Builders: Peene-Werft, Wolgast
- Operators: Volksmarine; German Navy; (Cape Verde) Cape Verdean Coast Guard; Estonian Navy; (Malta) Maritime Squadron AFM; Tunisian National Navy
- Succeeded by: Protector class (Malta); Diciotti class (Malta)
- Built: 1967-1970
- In commission: 1967-present
- Completed: 21; 4 modified
- Active: 2

General characteristics
- Type: Minesweeper
- Displacement: 339 tonnes (334 long tons)
- Length: 51.98 m (170 ft 6 in) o/a
- Beam: 7.12 m (23 ft 4 in)
- Draft: 2.4 m (7 ft 10 in)
- Propulsion: MD 40 diesel engines
- Speed: 20 knots (37 km/h; 23 mph)
- Range: 1,900 nmi (3,500 km)
- Complement: 24
- Armament: 1 × 25 mm FlaK 2M-3; up to 28 mines or 20 depth charges

Kondor II class
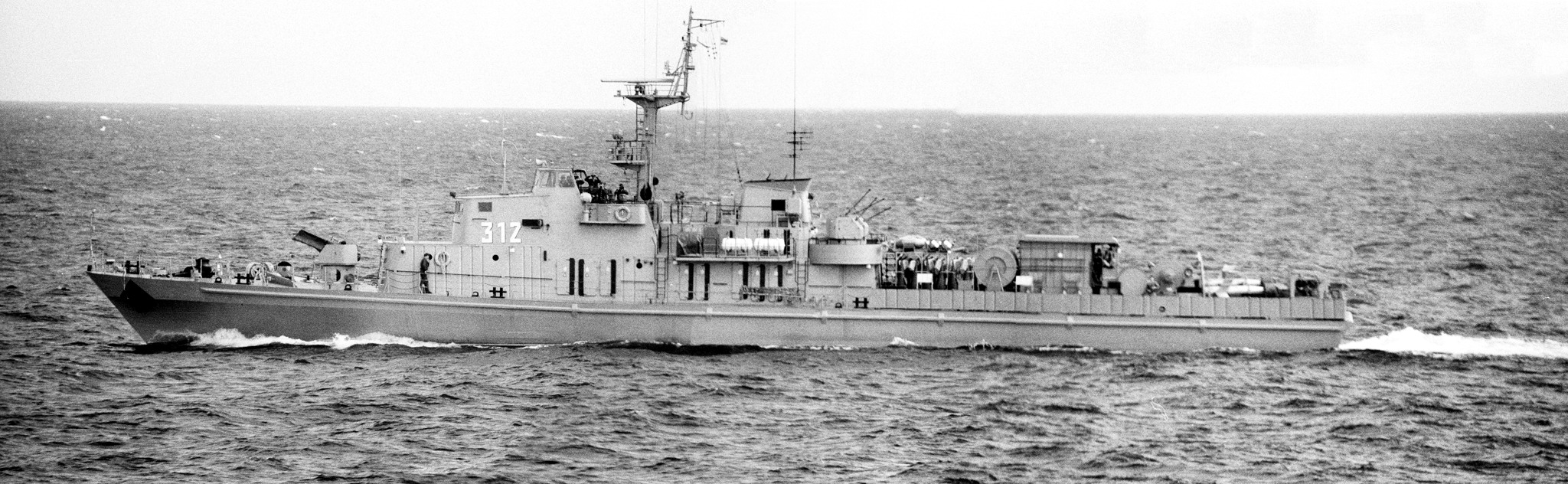
- Eisleben (312)

Class overview
- Builders: Peenewerft shipyard
- Operators: Volksmarine; German Navy; Indonesian Navy; Latvian Naval Forces; National Navy of Uruguay
- Succeeded by: Tripartite class (Latvia)
- Built: 1971-1973
- In commission: 1971-present
- Completed: 30; 2 modified
- Active: 10
- Lost: 1
- Retired: 2

General characteristics
- Type: Minesweeper
- Displacement: 449 tonnes (442 long tons)
- Length: 59.52 m (195 ft 3 in) o/a
- Beam: 7.76 m (25 ft 6 in)
- Draft: 2.22 m (7 ft 3 in)
- Propulsion: MD 40 diesel engines
- Speed: 18 knots (33 km/h; 21 mph)
- Range: 1,900 nmi (3,500 km)
- Complement: 29
- Armament: 3 × 25 mm FlaK 2M-3; up to 24 mines or 24 depth charges

The Project 89 minesweeper, also known as the Kondor class, was a class of minesweepers designed in the German Democratic Republic which was given the NATO designation of "Kondor". There were three versions, namely, the prototype unit, Project 89.0; the first version, Project 89.1 (NATO designation: Kondor I); and the second version, Project 89.2 (NATO designation: Kondor II).

== Ships in class ==
Pennant	Name	In commission	Fate
Project 89.0
V32	unnamed	1967-1981	
Project 89.1 (Kondor I)
V814	Greifswald	1969-1990	Sold in Guinea-Bissau as Mawia
S425	Bergen	1969-?	Fishing surveillance, 1981 as Warnemünde; Transferred to Tunisia as Ras Ipirkia
S426	Anklam	1969-1976	Sport and training vessel, 1976 as Ernst Thälmann; Rebuilt in the UK, Denmark and Israel
GS01	Ueckermünde	1969-1990; 1992-2004	Transferred to Malta, 1992 as P30; Laid up as of 2013
GS02	Demmin	1969-?	Transferred to Tunisia as Ras el Blad
GS03	Malchin	1969-?	Transferred to Tunisia as Ras el Drek
GS04	Altentreptow	1969-?	Transferred to Tunisia as Ras Mamoura
GS05	Pasewalk	1969-1990; 1992-2004	Transferred to Malta, 1992 as P31; Scuttled 2009
GS06	Templin	1969-?	Transferred to Tunisia as Ras Ajdir
G412	Neustrelitz	1969-1990	
G421	Vitte	1970-1990	
G444	Zingst	1970-1990	
G413	Prerow	1970-1990	
G424	Graal-Müritz	1970-1990	
GS07	Kühlungsborn	1970-1995; 1998–present	Transferred to German Coast Guard as Kühlungsborn (BG 32). Transferred to Cape Verde, 1998 as Vigilante (P521)
GS08	Ahrenshoop	1970-1995	Transferred to German Coast Guard as Ahrenshoop (BG 33).
G425	Kirchdorf	1970-1990	
GS09	Boltenhagen	1970-1996; 1997-2004	Transferred to German Coast Guard as Boltenhagen (BG 31). Transferred to Malta, 1997 as P29; Scuttled 2007
G416	Klütz	1970-1990	
G426	Rerik	1970-1990	
G446	Bansin	1970-1990	
Project 65.1 or 129 (torpedo trials craft)
V661	Libben	1971-1990	
V662	Strelasund	1971-1990	
Project 65.2 or 115 (reconnaissance ships)
	Komet	1972-1990; 1994-2000	Transferred to Estonia, 1994 as Vambola (M411); Laid up
	Meteor	1972-1990; 1994-2000	Transferred to Estonia, 1994 as Sulev (M412); Scrapped 2000
Project 89.2 (Kondor II)
V811	Wolgast	1971-1990; 1994–2019	Transferred to Indonesia, 1994 as KRI Pulau Rote (721); Decommissioned 28 August 2019
S321	Kamenz	1971-1981; 1992-2008	Transferred to Latvia, 1992 as Viesturs (M01)
334	Stralsund	1971-1990	
315	Wittstock	1971-1990	
321	Kyritz	1971-1990	
345	Neuruppin	1971-1990	
346	Strasburg	1971-1990	
324	Röbel	1971-1990; 1992-2008	Transferred to Latvia, 1992 as Imanta (M02)
325	Pritzwalk	1971-1990; 1994–present	Transferred to Indonesia, 1994 as KRI Pulau Romang (723); Decommissioned 6 February 2024
326	Rathenow	1972-1990	
331	Dessau	1972-1990	
332	Bitterfeld	1972-1991; 1994–present	Transferred to Germany, 1990 as Bitterfeld (M2672); Transferred to Indonesia, 1994 as KRI Pulau Rimau (724)
333	Tangerhütte	1972-1991	Transferred to Germany, 1990 as Tangerhütte (M2669)
V812	Genthin	1972-1988	
335	Zerbst	1972-1990; 1994–present	Transferred to Indonesia, 1994 as KRI Pulau Rondo (725), later renamed KRI Kelabang (826)
V813	Rosslau	1972-1990	
341	Oranienburg	1972-1990; 1994–present	Transferred to Indonesia, 1994 as KRI Pulau Rusa (726)
342	Jüterbog	1972-1990; 1994–present	Transferred to Indonesia, 1994 as KRI Pulau Rangsang (727)
343	Bernau	1972–2014	Transferred to Germany, 1990 as Bernau (M2673); Transferred to Uruguay, 1991 as Fortuna (ROU 33)
344	Eilenburg	1972-2000	Transferred to Germany, 1990 as Eilenburg (M2674); Transferred to Uruguay, 1991 as Valiente (ROU 32); Sunk after collision in 2000
322	Riesa	1973-1990; 1991–present	Transferred to Uruguay, 1991 as Temerario (ROU 31)
323	Wilhem-Pieck-Stadt Guben	1973-1990	
311	Sömmerda	1973-1991; 1994–present	Transferred to Germany, 1990 as Sömmerda (M2670); Transferred to Indonesia, 1994 as KRI Pulau Raibu (728), later renamed KRI Kala Hitam (828)
312	Eisleben	1973–present	Transferred to Germany, 1990 as Eisleben (M2671); Transferred to Uruguay, 1991 as Audaz (ROU 34)
313	Gransee	1973-1990	
314	Zeitz	1973-1981	
315	Hettstedt	1973-1981; 1994–present	Transferred to Indonesia, 1994 as KRI Pulau Raas (722)
316	Altenburg	1973-1990	
314	Schönebeck	1973-1990	
336	Grimma	1973-1990; 1994–present	Transferred to Indonesia, 1994 as KRI Pulau Rempang (729); Decommissioned 15 October 2021
Project 131 (state yacht)
	Ostseeland	1971-1990	
Project 136 (survey vessel)
	Carl Friedrich Gauß	1975-?	Transferred to Germany

== Foreign service ==
=== Cape Verde ===
The Kondor I vessel Kuhlungsborn was used by the German Coast Guard. In 1998 it was transferred to Cape Verde and was renamed Vigilante carrying the pennant number P 521. It is still in service.

=== Estonia ===
The Kondor I vessels Komet and Meteor were transferred to Estonia as Vambola and Sulev in 1994. Sulev was scrapped in 2000 while Vambola remains laid up awaiting to be scrapped.

=== Indonesia ===
Nine Kondor II vessels were transferred to Indonesia around 1994. Six of the vessels are still in active service. KRI Kala Hitam (828) (ex-Sömmerda) and KRI Kelabang (826) (ex-Zerbst) were converted into patrol vessels due to minehunting equipment failures. KRI Pulau Rote (721) (ex-Wolgast) was decommissioned on 28 August 2019. KRI Pulau Rempang (729) (ex-Grimma) was decommissioned on 15 October 2021. KRI Pulau Romang (723) (ex-Pritzwalk) was decommissioned on 6 February 2024.

=== Latvia ===
Two Kondor II vessels were transferred to Latvia in 1992 and were renamed Viesturs and Imanta. They were used as minehunters until they decommissioned in 2008.

=== Malta ===
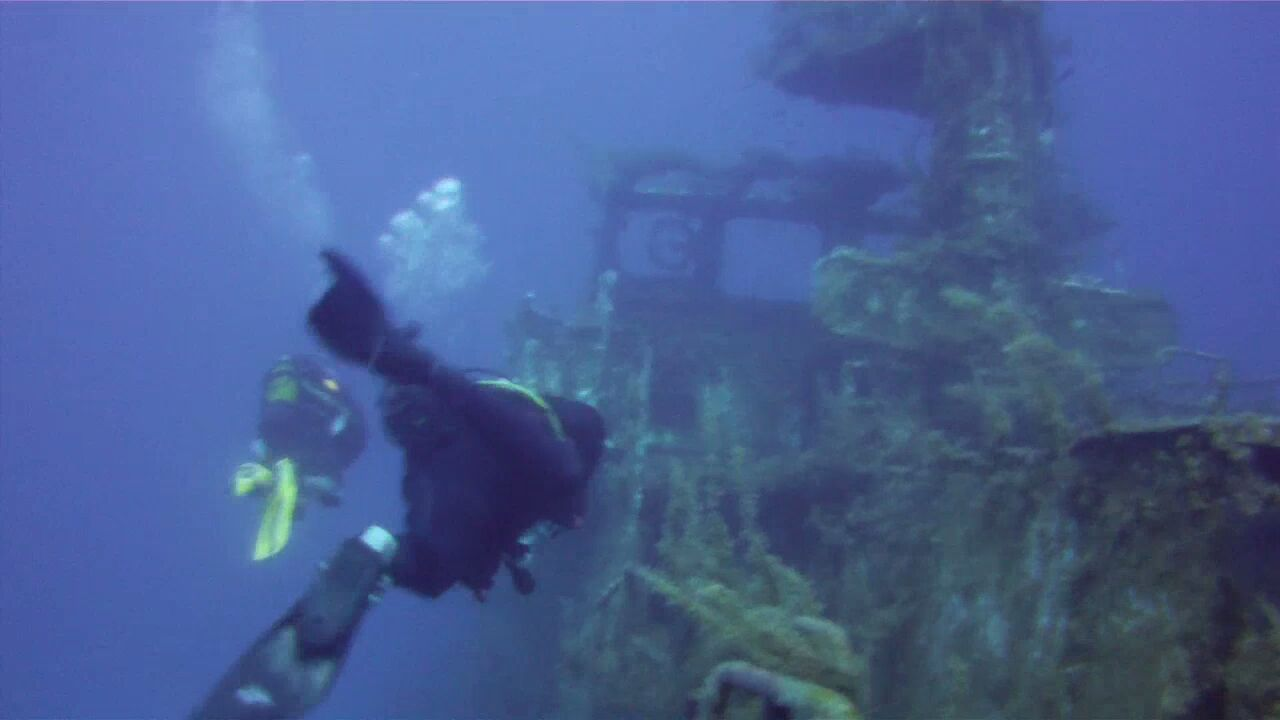
The wreck of P29 (ex-Boltenhagen)

Two Kondor I vessels, Ueckermünde and Pasewalk, were sold to Malta in 1992, where they were given the pennant numbers P30 and P31. A third ship, Boltenhagen, was also sold in 1997 and it was given the pennant number P29. The three vessels served with the Offshore Command of the Maritime Squadron of the AFM until they were decommissioned in 2004 and were replaced by more modern patrol boats. P29 was scuttled as an artificial diving site off Ċirkewwa in 2007, while P31 followed being sunk off Comino in 2009. As of 2013, P30 was laid up at Cassar Ship Repair Yard, Marsa.

=== Tunisia ===
Five Kondor I minesweepers were transferred to the Tunisian Navy as coastal patrol craft according to Jane's Fighting Ships for 1999-2000. Today only one is still in service.

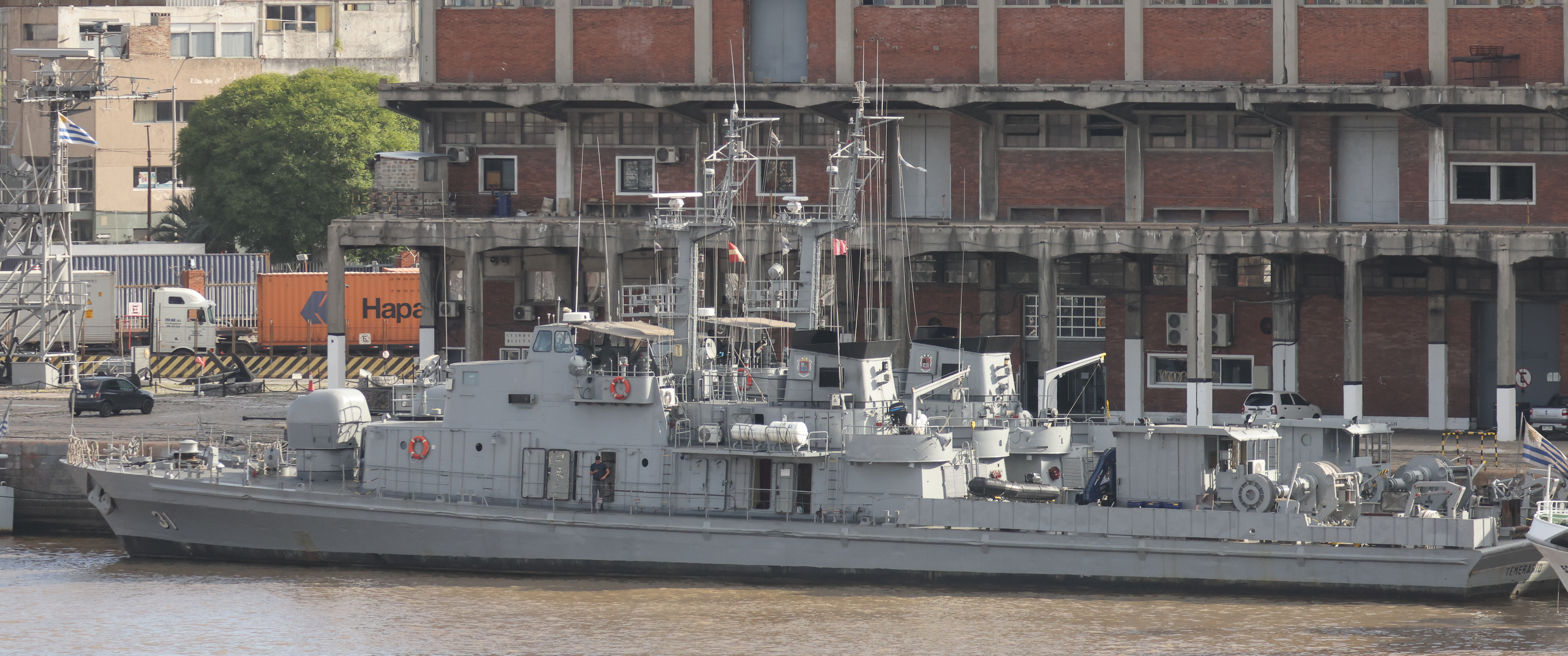
ROU Temerario moored at Montevideo in 2024

=== Uruguay ===
The Kondor II vessels Riesa, Eilenburg, Bernau and Eisleben were transferred to Uruguay and renamed Temerario, Valiente, Fortuna and Audaz on 11 October 1991. Valiente was rammed by the Panamian freighter Skyros on 5 August 2000 and was torn in half with 8 sailors killed and 3 missing. Fortuna was scrapped and the other two are still in service.
