= Ċirkewwa =

Harbour in Malta

Coordinates: 35°59′16″N 14°19′43″E

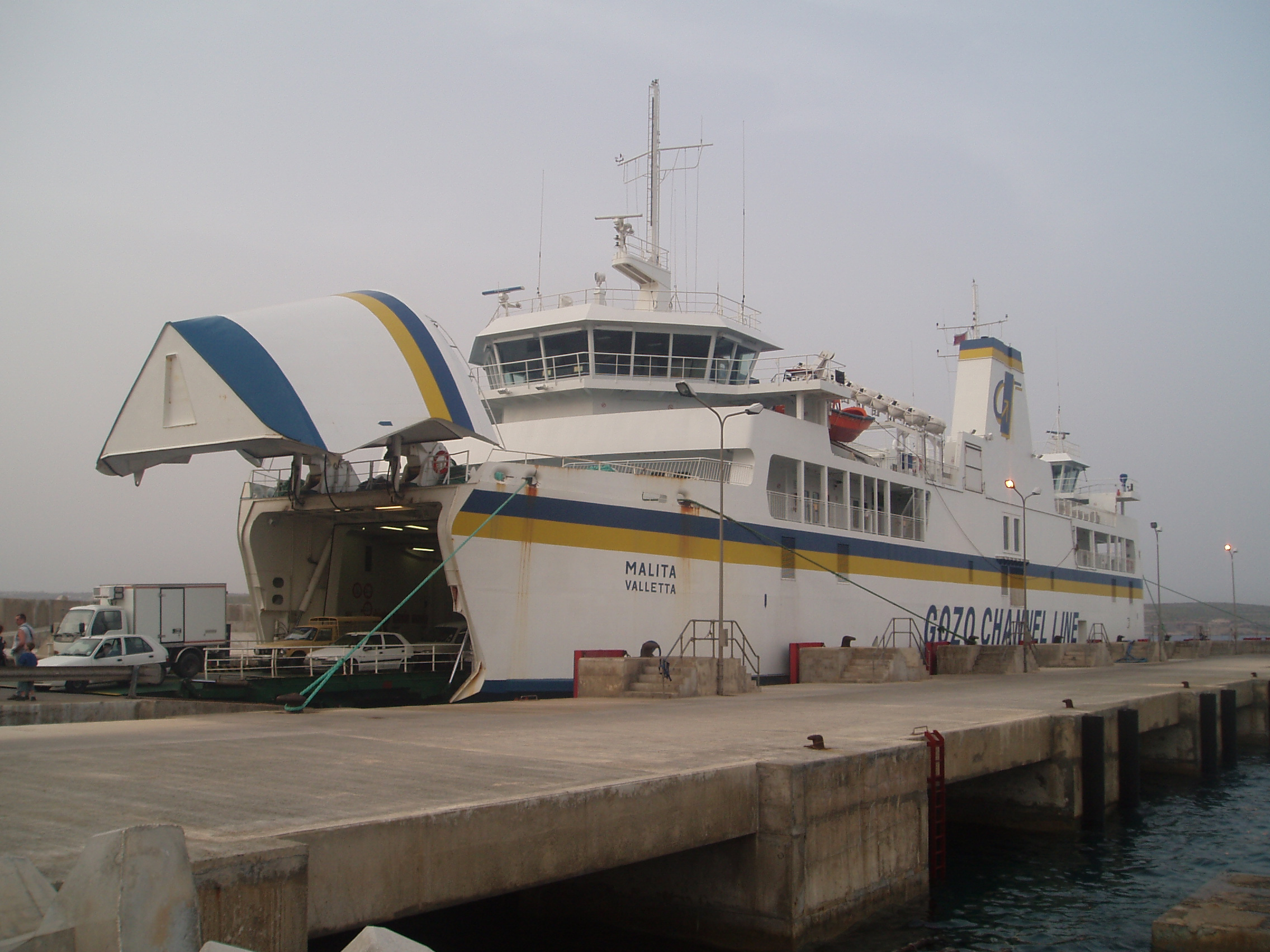
A ferry unloads at Ċirkewwa after arriving from Mġarr, Gozo.

Ċirkewwa (Maltese: Iċ-Ċirkewwa) is a harbour and zone situated at the northernmost point of Malta, part of the locality of Mellieħa.

It is the site of the Ċirkewwa Ferry Terminal, from where regular car ferries operate to the port of Mġarr in Gozo. In the summer, boat trips to Comino also operate, as well as organised diving excursions. As Ċirkewwa is a point on the northernmost end of the island, and not a town, there is no major infrastructure besides the terminal, but near the harbour there is a hotel resort. Paradise Bay, a sandy beach, is also nearby, to the south of the Ċirkewwa peninsula.

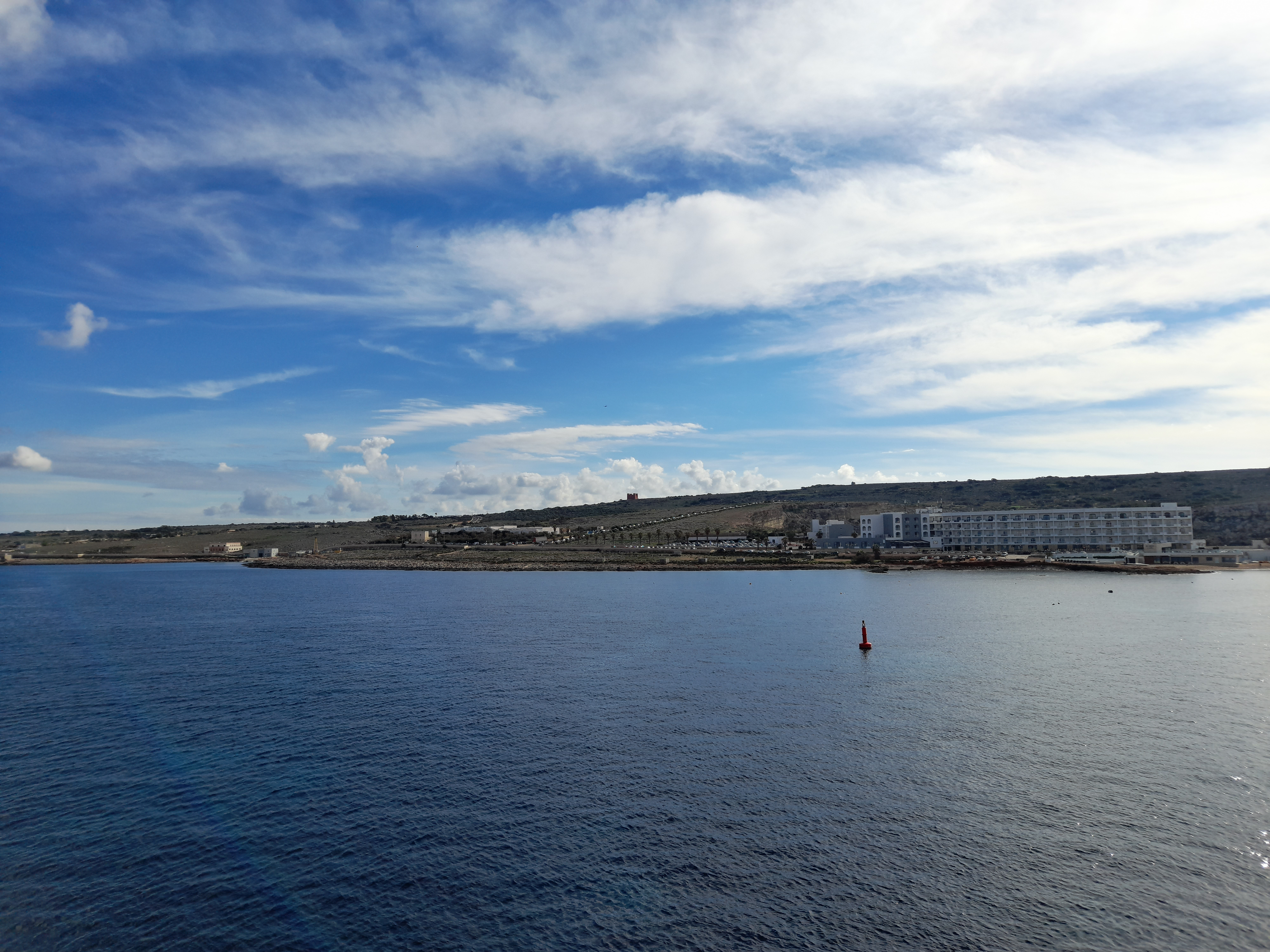
Marfa Bay and the Paradise Bay Resort (right)

Visitors travelling to Gozo can reach Ċirkewwa by car by following road signs to Gozo, and by bus directly from Valletta, Sliema, Buġibba and St. Paul's Bay.

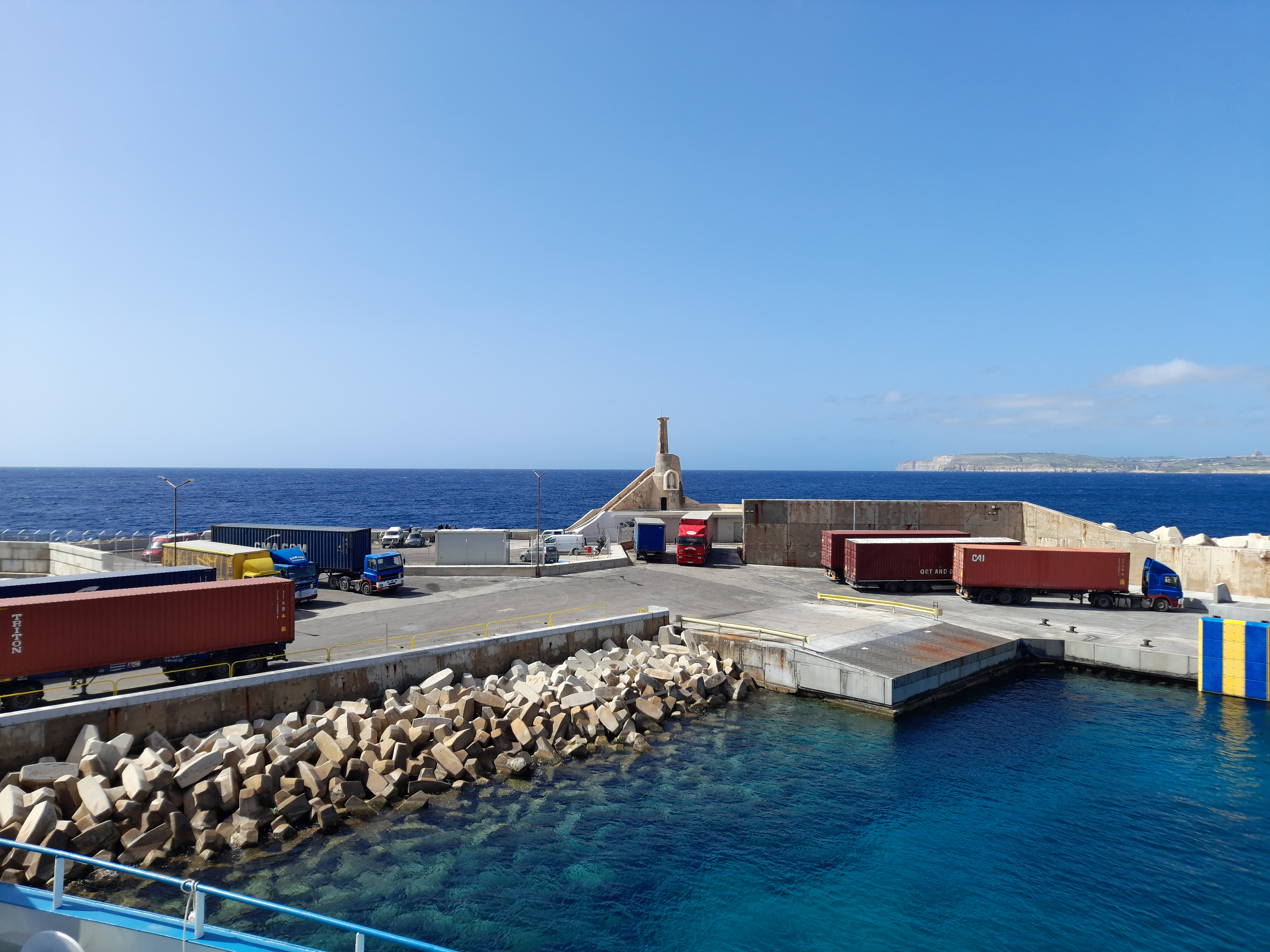
Ċirkewwa Harbour

== Etymology ==
The name Ċirkewwa is derived from the Maltese word "ċirka", which means "circle". This name was given to the town due to its circular shape, as it is situated on a small peninsula that curves outward into the Mediterranean Sea.

== Diving ==
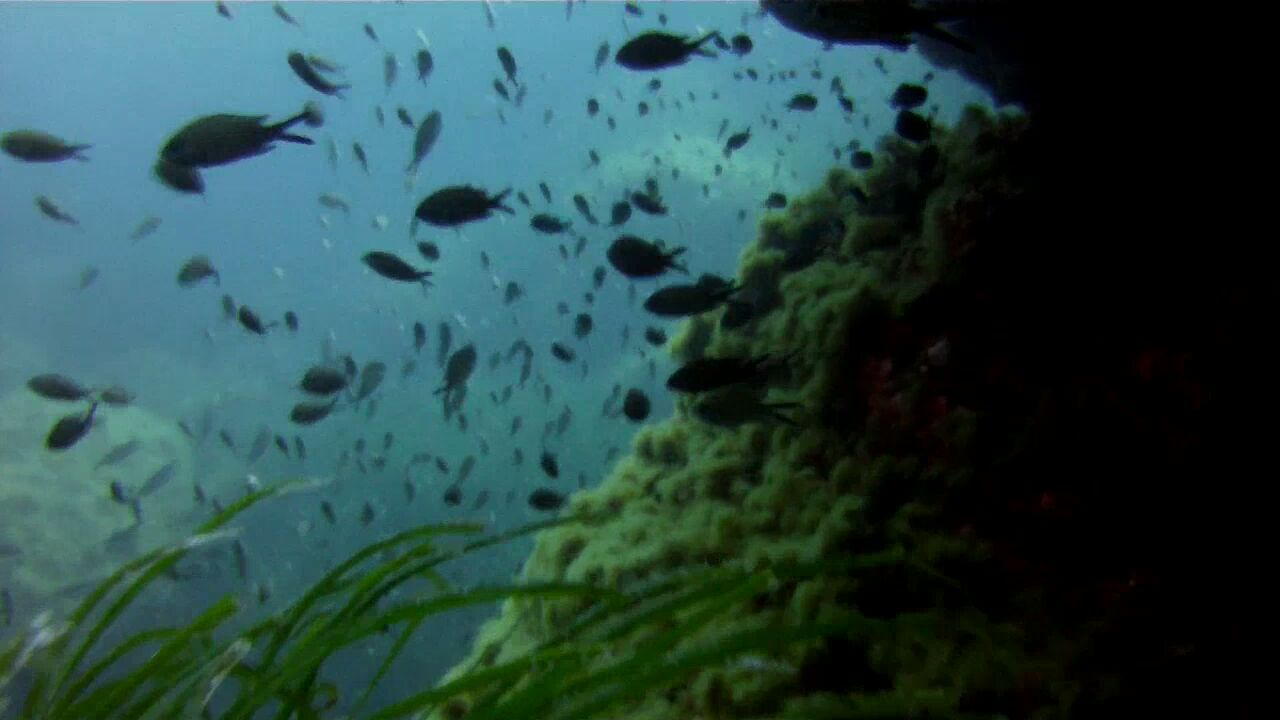
Ċirkewwa Arch

Ċirkewwa is one of the most visited scuba diving sites on the Maltese Islands. It has underwater cliffs, caves, tunnels and an arch down to the seabed at 27m. Ċirkewwa also includes the wrecks of the tugboat MV Rozi and the P29 patrol boat, which were intentionally sunk in 1992 and 2007, respectively. Out towards Marfa Point is a statue of the Virgin Mary which was placed in a natural cavern by the Amphibians Diving Club.

From the middle of 2010, divers have been cooperating to designate Ċirkewwa as a Voluntary Marine Reserve to safeguard the site. The site now has the support of the diving community which is working to gain the support of the fishing, angling and boating communities to implement a code of conduct to preserve and protect the site.

Ċirkewwa is also home to the Ċirkewwa Hole located near the ferry terminal.
