= A-class torpedo boat =

1914 class of German torpedo boats

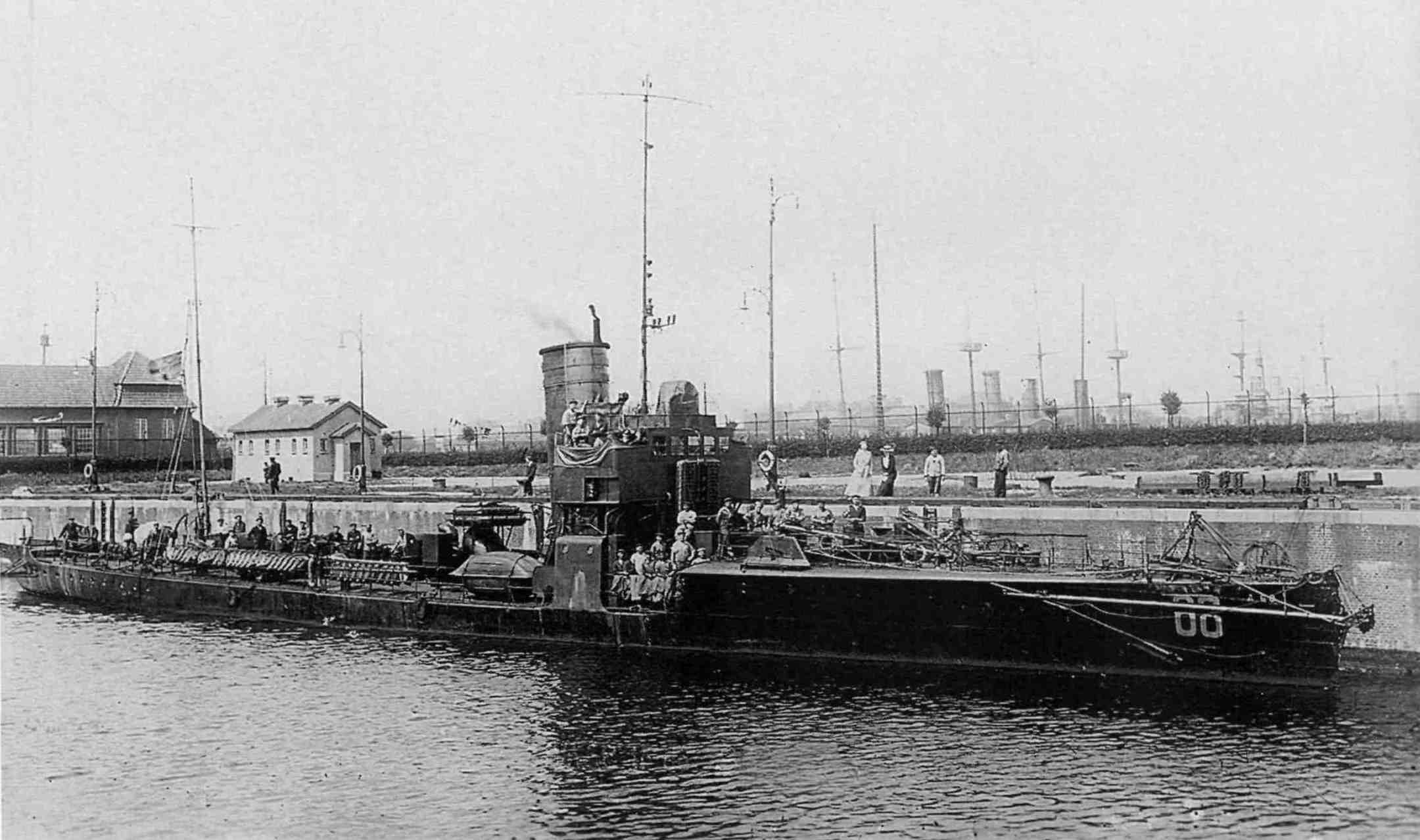
- SMS A 68

Class overview
- Operators: Imperial German Navy; Polish Navy; Belgian Navy; Estonian Navy; Soviet Navy
- Built: 1914–1918
- In service: 1914–1950
- Planned: 113
- Completed: 92
- Canceled: 21
- Lost: 30

The A-class torpedo boats were a class of German single-funnelled torpedo boat/light destroyer designed by the Reichsmarineamt for operations off the coast of occupied Flanders in the First World War. The "A" designation was to avoid confusion with older classes and designs. They were classed officially as "coastal torpedo boats" (German: Küstentorpedoboote) to differentiate from larger, ocean-going torpedo boats.

Six groups of vessels were built under the class between 1914 and 1918, increasing in displacement from 109 to 335 t (107 to 330 long tons; 120 to 369 short tons). All had a raised forecastle, shallow draught, and carried one (for most) or two (for A1 – A25) 17.7 in (45 cm) torpedo tubes amidships.

== A-I type (A1 – A25) ==
General characteristics (A1 to A25)
- Displacement: 109 t (107 long tons)
- Length: 41 m (134 ft 6 in) wl
- Beam: 4.6 m (15 ft 1 in)
- Draught: 1.52 m (5 ft 0 in)
- Installed power: Coal-fired, single-shaft, triple-expansion steam engine, 1,200 ihp (895 kW)
- Propulsion: 1 shaft; 1 × 1.8 m (5 ft 11 in) propeller
- Speed: 20 knots (37 km/h; 23 mph)
- Range: 900 nautical miles (1,700 km; 1,000 mi) at 12.5 knots (23.2 km/h; 14.4 mph)
- Complement: 28
- Armament: 1 × 5 cm (2.0 in) SK L/40 or 5.2 cm (2 in) SK L/55 deck gun; 2 × 17.7 in (45 cm) torpedo tubes; 4 × mines

All 25 were ordered in 1914, and were designed and built by A.G. 'Vulcan', at their Hamburg yard.

Name	Yard No.	Launched	Commissioned	Fate
A1	20	16 January 1915	29 January 1915	Surrendered and scrapped between 1921 and 1922.
A2	21	17 March 1915	23 March 1915	Sunk by British destroyers on 1 May 1915 during the Battle off Noordhinder Bank.
A3	22	24 June 1915	13 July 1915	Sunk on 7 November 1915 en route from Kiel to Danzig.
A4	23	26 June 1915	30 June 1915	Surrendered at Antwerp and commissioned in the Belgian Navy until 1927
A5	24	5 May 1915	10 May 1915	Interned in the Netherlands, commissioned in the Belgian Navy until 1927
A6	25	3 April 1915	8 April 1915	Sunk by British destroyers on 1 May 1915 during the Battle off Noordhinder Bank.
A7	26	2 February 1915	19 April 1915	Sunk by British and French destroyers off the Flanders coast on 21 March 1918.
A8	27	25 April 1915	21 May 1915	Interned in the Netherlands, commissioned in the Belgian Navy until 1927
A9	28	4 August 1915	6 August 1915	Interned in the Netherlands, commissioned in the Belgian Navy until 1927
A10	29	16 August 1915	23 August 1915	Mined off Flanders on 7 February 1918.
A11	30	4 June 1915	7 June 1915	Sunk during the Kapp Putsch in 1920.
A12	31	28 April 1915	2 May 1915	Surrendered at Antwerp and commissioned in the Belgian Navy until 1927
A13	32	15 May 1915	21 May 1915	Bombed in dock at Ostend on 16 August 1917.
A14	33	22 July 1915	27 July 1915	Surrendered at Antwerp and commissioned in the Belgian Navy until 1927
A15	34	10 July 1915	15 July 1915	Sunk by French destroyers on 23 August 1915
A16	35	16 June 1915	19 June 1915	Interned in the Netherlands, commissioned in the Belgian Navy until 1927
A17	36	8 June 1915	6 July 1915	Sunk during the Kapp Putsch in 1920.
A18	37	2 July 1915	20 July 1915	Surrendered and scrapped between 1921 and 1922.
A19	38	9 September 1915	15 October 1915	Sunk by British and French destroyers off the Flanders coast on 21 March 1918.
A20	39	27 August 1915	1 September 1915	Interned in the Netherlands, commissioned in the Belgian Navy until 1927
A21	40	1 June 1915	29 June 1915	Surrendered and scrapped between 1921 and 1922.
A22	41	22 May 1915	8 June 1915	Surrendered and scrapped between 1921 and 1922.
A23	42	5 May 1915	29 May 1915	Surrendered and scrapped between 1921 and 1922.
A24	43	12 June 1915	6 August 1915	Surrendered and scrapped between 1921 and 1922.
A25	44	13 July 1915	27 July 1915	Surrendered and scrapped between 1921 and 1922.

=== History ===
Sixteen A-I-class torpedo boats, A2, A4-A16, A19 and A20, were transported in sections to the Kaiserliche Werft Antwerpen in Hoboken, re-assembled and then transferred by inland canals to Bruges, much like was done with similar size Type UB I and Type UC I U-boats. These torpedo boats formed the Flanders Torpedoboat Flotilla which was part of the Naval Corps. These torpedoboats provided cover for departing and returning U-boats of the Flanders U-boat flotilla, and operated against British forces trying to block the ports of Ostend and Zeebrugge with mines and ant-submarine nets. On four occasions the flotilla shelled Calais. When the torpedoboat flotilla was reinforced with larger A-II-class torpedo boats, the remaining A-I-class were converted into minehunters and commissioned on 1 April in the first Flanders Minehunter Half-Flotilla.

A4, A12 and A14 were abandoned in Antwerp after the German evacuation at the end of the First World War. Taken over by Belgium. Remained operational until 1927.

A5, A8, A9, A16 and A20 were interned in the Netherlands at the end of the war, and handed over to Belgium as reparations in 1919. Decommissioned in 1927 and most scrapped. A20 remained in use as training vessel and captured by Germans in 1940. Scrapped 1948.

== A-II type (A26 – A55) ==
General characteristics (A26 to A55)
- Displacement: 227–229 t (223–225 long tons)
- Length: 49 m (160 ft 9 in) LWL
- Beam: 5.32–5.62 m (17 ft 5 in – 18 ft 5 in)
- Draught: 2.34 m (7 ft 8 in)
- Installed power: Oil-fired, single-shaft, geared turbine steam engine, 3,250 hp (2,424 kW)
- Propulsion: 1 × shafts; 1 × 1.88 m (6 ft 2 in)
- Speed: 25 knots (46 km/h; 29 mph)
- Range: 690 nautical miles (1,280 km; 790 mi) at 20 knots (37 km/h; 23 mph)
- Complement: 29
- Armament: 2 × 8.8 cm (3.5 in) guns; 1 × 17.7 in (45 cm) torpedo tube; Minelaying capability

All 30 were ordered in two batches - 24 vessels in 1915, and 6 added later. All were designed and built by F. Schichau Werke, at their Elbing yard. The second batch were 2 tonnes heavier, and had a beam of 5.2 metres (18ft 5.25in).

Name	Yard No.	Launched	Commissioned	Fate
A26	959	20 May 1916	22 July 1916	Surrendered and scrapped between 1920 and 1921.
A27	960	27 May 1916	12 August 1916	Surrendered on 20 August 1920. Scrapped between 1920 and 1921.
A28	961	10 June 1916	26 August 1916	Surrendered on 20 August 1920. Scrapped between 1920 and 1921.
A29	962	15 June 1916	9 September 1916	Surrendered on 20 August 1920. Scrapped between 1920 and 1921.
A30	963	15 July 1916	28 September 1916	Interned in the Netherlands, allocated to Belgium in 1919. Discarded in 1927.
A31	964	1 July 1916	30 September 1916	Surrendered on 20 August 1920. Scrapped between 1920 and 1921.
A32	965	15 July 1916	14 October 1916	See EML Sulev (1924) below
A33	966	29 July 1916	30 October 1916	Surrendered on 15 September 1920. Scrapped between 1920 and 1921.
A34	967	20 July 1916	8 November 1916	Surrendered on 15 September 1920. Scrapped between 1920 and 1921.
A35	968	19 August 1916	1 December 1916	Surrendered on 20 August 1920. Scrapped between 1920 and 1921.
A36	969	14 August 1916	27 November 1916	Surrendered on 20 August 1920. Scrapped between 1920 and 1921.
A37	970	12 August 1916	24 November 1916	Surrendered on 15 September 1920. Scrapped between 1920 and 1921.
A38	971	17 October 1916	14 March 1917	Surrendered on 15 September 1920. Scrapped between 1920 and 1921.
A39	972	12 September 1916	16 December 1916	Surrendered on 20 August 1920. Scrapped between 1920 and 1921.
A40	973	2 September 1916	8 December 1916	Interned in the Netherlands, allocated to Belgium in 1919. Discarded in 1927.
A41	974	8 December 1916	16 March 1917	Surrendered on 20 August 1920. Scrapped between 1920 and 1921.
A42	975	1 November 1916	5 January 1917	Interned in the Netherlands, allocated to Belgium in 1919. Discarded in 1927.
A43	976	25 December 1916	2 April 1917	Scrapped in 1943.
A44	977	10 March 1917	30 April 1917	Surrendered on 15 September 1920. Scrapped between 1920 and 1921.
A45	978	8 November 1916	15 June 1917	Surrendered on 3 September 1920. Scrapped between 1920 and 1921.
A46	979	24 March 1917	22 May 1917	Surrendered and scrapped between 1920 and 1921.
A47	980	23 April 2017	22 June 1917	Interned in the Netherlands, allocated to Belgium in 1919. Discarded in 1927.
A48	981	9 June 1917	31 July 1917	Surrendered and scrapped between 1920 and 1921.
A49	982	19 May 1917	20 August 1917	Surrendered and scrapped between 1920 and 1921.
A50	988	8 July 1917	20 August 1917	Mined in the North Sea on 17 November 1917
A51	989	16 May 1917	26 July 1917	Scuttled at Fiume on 29 October 1918.
A52	990	18 January 1917	1 April 1917	Surrendered and scrapped between 1920 and 1921.
A53	991	3 February 1917	7 April 1917	Surrendered and scrapped between 1920 and 1921.
A54	992	22 February 1917	14 April 1917	Surrendered and scrapped between 1920 and 1921.
A55	993	10 March 1917	27 April 1917	Surrendered and scrapped between 1920 and 1921.

=== History ===
Eleven A-II-class torpedo boats were commissioned into the Flanders Torpedoboat flotilla. Seven boats, A-39, A-40 and A-46 - A-50 were transported in sections to Hoboken and re-assembled there. Four others, A-42 - A-45 were transferred by sea.

==== EML Sulev (1924) ====
SMS A32 was sunk during the "Operation Albion" on 25 October 1917, raised and repaired in 1923 by Estonia, and served as EML Sulev (see Sulev (torpeedopaat)) in the Estonian Navy from 1924 (2 other ships named EML Sulev have been in Estonian Navy service, entering service in 1994 and 2000). Taken by Soviet Union in October 1940, it was renamed Аметист (Ametist, "Amethyst") and served in the Soviet Navy as a patrol vessel, then reduced to a tender in 1942 until scrapped in 1950.

== A-III type - A. G. Vulcan design (A56 – A67, A80 – A91, and A96 – A113) ==
General characteristics (A56 to A67) (A80 to A91) and (A96 to A113)
- Displacement: 330–335 t (325–330 long tons)
- Length: 59.3–60.12 m (194 ft 7 in – 197 ft 3 in) LWL
- Beam: 6.42 m (21 ft 1 in)
- Draught: 2.21–2.34 m (7 ft 3 in – 7 ft 8 in)
- Installed power: Oil-fired, geared turbine steam engine, 6,000 shp (4,474 kW)
- Propulsion: 2 × shafts; 2 × 1.7 m (5 ft 7 in) propeller
- Speed: 28 knots (52 km/h; 32 mph)
- Range: 800 nautical miles (1,500 km; 920 mi) at 20 knots (37 km/h; 23 mph)
- Complement: 50
- Armament: 2 × 8.8 cm (3.5 in) guns; 1 × 17.7 in (45 cm) torpedo tube

These 42 vessels were ordered in three batches - A56 to A67 in 1916, A80 to A91 in 1917, and A96 – A113 in 1918. Designed by A. G. Vulcan, who built all of them except for A83, A84 and A85, which were built by Howaldtswerke at Kiel, while the hulls of A64 to A67 were subcontracted to Seebeckwerft. None of the 1918 batch of 18 vessels were ever completed, and they were all stricken on 3 November 1918, some being up to 35% complete (these were broken up on the stocks) but none being launched.

Name	Yard No.	Launched	Commissioned	Fate
A56	476	28 February 1917	14 April 1917	Sunk by mine on 12 March 1918.
A57	477	28 February 1917	28 April 1917	Sunk by mine on 1 March 1918.
A58	478	31 March 1917	19 May 1917	Sunk by mine on 16 August 1918.
A59	479	13 April 1917	9 June 1917	Surrendered on 30 September 1920.
A60	480	15 May 1917	23 June 1917	Sunk by mine on 23 June 1917.
A61	481	15 May 1917	11 July 1917	Surrendered to Britain on 15 September 1920. Scrapped in 1923.
A62	482	8 June 1917	25 July 1917	Surrendered to Britain on 15 September 1920. Scrapped in 1923.
A63	483	16 June 1917	11 August 1917	Surrendered to France on 30 September 1920. Scrapped in 1923.
A64	484	30 March 1918	8 August 1918	Surrendered on 15 September 1920.
A65	485	30 March 1918	24 August 1918	Surrendered on 3 September 1920. Given to Brazil, scuttled in Britain.
A66	486	23 June 1918	20 September 1918	Surrendered to France on 30 September 1920. Scrapped in 1923.
A67	487	23 June 1918	not completed	Stricken (incompleted) on 3 November 1919.
A80	514	24 October 1917	21 December 1917	Surrendered on 30 September 1920.
A81	515	27 November 1917	10 January 1918	Surrendered on 30 September 1920 and scrapped.
A82	516	27 March 1918	1 June 1918	Scuttled at Fiume on 29 October 1918.
A83	614	18 May 1918	28 May 1918	Stricken (incompleted) on 3 November 1919.
A84	615	18 May 1918	19 April 1918	Stricken (incompleted) on 3 November 1919
A85	616	18 May 1918	6 June 1918	Stricken (incompleted) on 3 November 1919
A86	535	5 February 1918	16 March 1918	Surrendered on 30 September 1920 and scrapped.
A87	536	21 February 1918	8 April 1918	Surrendered on 15 September 1920 and scrapped.
A88	537	2 March 1918	27 April 1918	Surrendered on 30 September 1920 and scrapped.
A89	538	22 March 1918	14 May 1918	Surrendered on 30 September 1920 and scrapped.
A90	539	6 April 1918	6 June 1918	Surrendered on 30 September 1920 and scrapped.
A91	540	27 April 1918	22 June 1918	Surrendered on 30 September 1920 and scrapped.
A96: A113	575: 592	none launched		Stricken on 3 November 1918

=== History ===
Four A-III-class torpedo boats A58-A61 were commissioned in the Flanders Torpedoboat Flotilla in 1917. A59, A60 and A61 caused severe damage to HMS Terror on 19 October 1917.

A59, A64 and A80 were transferred to Poland in 1921, becoming ORP Ślązak, ORP Krakowiak and ORP Góral respectively. Ślązak became target ship in 1937 and was captured by the Germans in 1939. Sunk under tow. Krakowiak was stricken in October 1936 and scrapped. Góral was renamed Podhalanin in 1922. She was converted to oil hulk in 1939 and sunk by German bombers while under tow on 24 September 1939.

== A-III type - Schichau 1916 design (A68 – A79) ==
General characteristics (A68 to A79)
- Displacement: 330 t (325 long tons)
- Length: 60.2 m (197 ft 6 in) LWL
- Beam: 6.41 m (21 ft 0 in)
- Draught: 2.11 m (6 ft 11 in)
- Installed power: Oil-fired, geared turbine steam engine, 5,700 shp (4,250 kW)
- Propulsion: 2 × shafts; 2 × 1.6 m (5 ft 3 in)
- Speed: 26 knots (48 km/h; 30 mph)
- Range: 800 nautical miles (1,500 km; 920 mi) at 20 knots (37 km/h; 23 mph)
- Complement: 50
- Armament: 2 × 8.8 cm (3.5 in) guns; 1 × 17.7 in (45 cm) torpedo tube

These twelve vessels were ordered in 1916, and were designed and built by F. Schichau at Elbing.

Name	Yard No.	Launched	Commissioned	Fate
A68	994	11 April 1917	13 June 1917	Surrendered on 3 September 1920.
A69	995	28 April 1917	4 July 1917	Surrendered on 3 September 1920.
A70	996	19 May 1917	23 July 1917	Surrendered on 30 September 1920.
A71	997	9 June 1917	13 August 1917	Sunk by mine on 4 May 1918.
A72	998	30 June 1917	1 September 1917	Sunk by mine on 14 May 1918.
A73	999	7 July 1917	21 September 1917	Sunk by mine on 20 January 1918.
A74	1000	4 August 1917	9 October 1917	Surrendered on 3 September 1920.
A75	1001	11 August 1917	26 October 1917	Surrendered on 30 September 1920.
A76	1002	1 September 1917	12 November 1917	Surrendered on 30 September 1920.
A77	1003	22 September 1917	27 November 1917	Sunk by mine on 20 January 1918.
A78	1004	13 October 1917	15 December 1917	Surrendered on 3 September 1920.
A79	1005	8 November 1917	12 January 1918	Sunk by mine on 10 July 1918.

- A68 was transferred to Poland in 1921, becoming ORP Kujawiak. Converted to oil hulk 1939. Sunk by German bombers 3 September 1939 off Danzig.
- A68, A69, A70, A74, A75, A76, and A78 all surrendered in September 1920 (and so were stricken) and were scrapped in 1922/23.
- A71, A72, A73, A77 and A79 were all sunk by mines in the North Sea during 1918.

== A-III type - Schichau 1917 design (A92 – A95) ==
General characteristics (A92 to A95) identical to A68 to A79 batch except:
- Length: 59.4 m (194 ft 11 in) wl
- Draught: 2.08–2.12 m (6 ft 10 in – 6 ft 11 in)
- Installed power: Oil-fired, geared turbine steam engine, 5,700–6,000 shp (4,250–4,474 kW)
- Propulsion: 2 × shafts; 2 × 1.6 m (5 ft 3 in) propellers
- Speed: 26.5 knots (49.1 km/h; 30.5 mph)

These last four vessels were designed and built by F. Schichau Werke, at their Elbing yard, with a slight variation in their dimensions from the 1916 design. The first two served in a minesweeper flotilla and the last two in an escort flotilla prior to the surrender.

Name	Yard No.	Launched	Commissioned	Fate
A92	1019	16 March 1918	24 May 1918	Surrendered on 15 September 1920.
A93	1020	9 April 1918	18 June 1918	Surrendered on 30 September 1920.
A94	1021	27 April 1918	19 July 1918	Surrendered on 30 September 1920.
A95	1022	25 May 1918	19 August 1918	Surrendered on 30 September 1920.

- All four vessels were scrapped at Bo'ness in 1923 (A93 in 1922).
