= Maltese patrol boat P71 =

Maltese Offshore Patrol Vessel

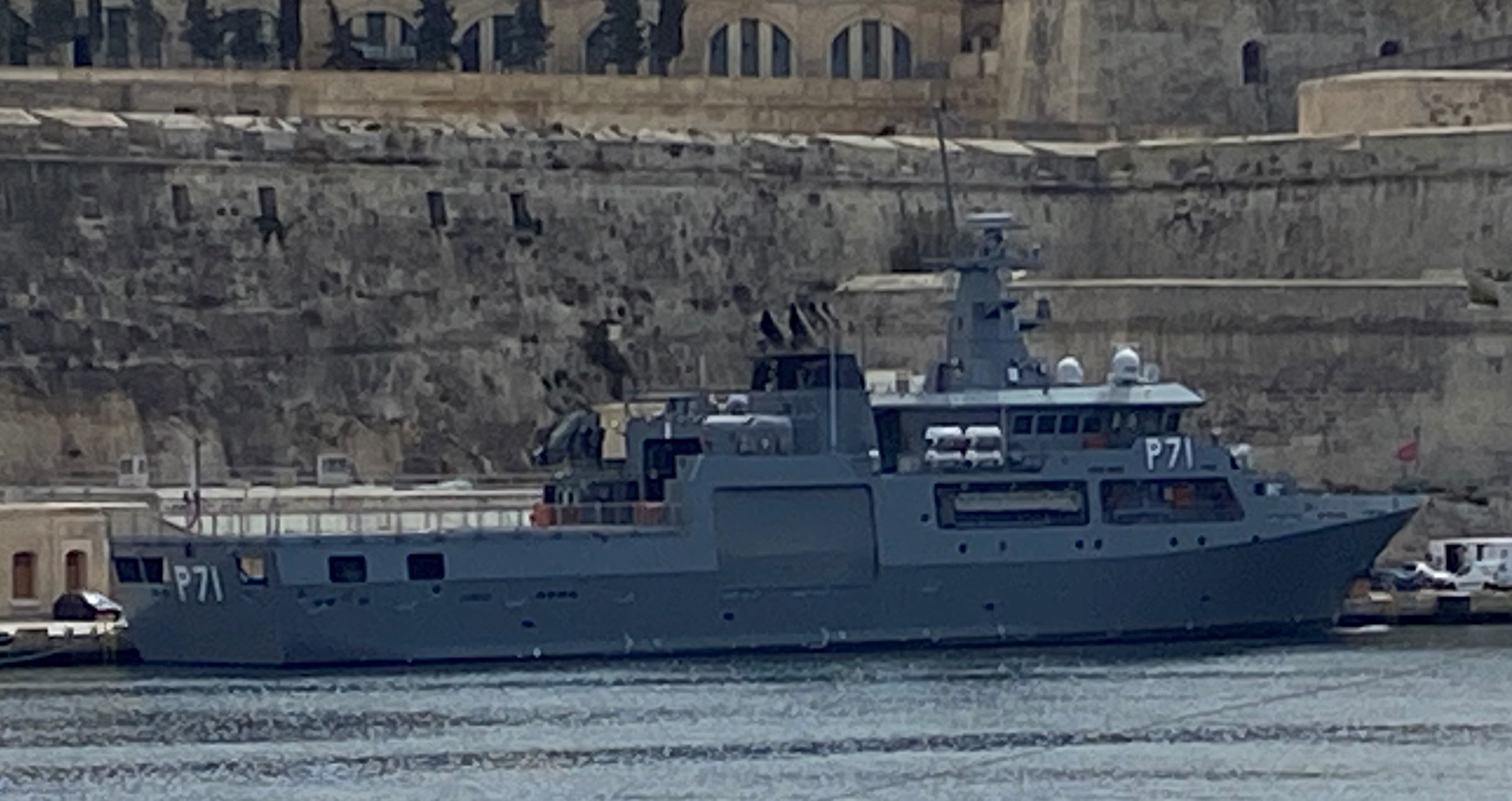
- P71 at Hay Wharf

Malta
- Name: P71
- Ordered: 10 October 2018
- Builder: Cantiere Navale Vittoria
- Cost: €48.6 million
- Launched: 27 February 2021
- Completed: 7 November 2022
- Commissioned: 22 March 2023
- In service: 2023 -
- Home port: Hay Wharf
- Status: Active

General characteristics
- Class & type: OPV748
- Type: Offshore patrol vessel
- Displacement: 2,244 tonnes
- Length: 74.8 m (245 ft 5 in) overall
- Beam: 13 m (42 ft 8 in)
- Draught: 3.8 m (12 ft 6 in)
- Installed power: 10,880 kW (14,590 hp)
- Propulsion: 2 x 5,440 kW (7,300 hp) Wärtsilä diesel engines with Power-take-in; 2 x Rolls-Royce PROMAS controllable-pitch propellers
- Speed: over 20 knots (37 km/h; 23 mph)
- Range: 2,100kms at 16 knots (30 km/h; 18 mph)
- Endurance: 15 days
- Boats & landing craft carried: 2 x 9.1 m (30 ft) RHIBs
- Capacity: 50 crew and accommodation for 20 Special Operations Unit
- Complement: 25 (4 Officers)
- Armament: 1 x OTO SINGLE 25mm Oerlikon KBA (RCWS); 1 × 12.7 mm (0.50 in) machine gun; 2 x 7.62 mm (0.300 in) machine guns
- Armour: Level 2
- Aviation facilities: Helicopter deck

P71 is an offshore patrol vessel of the Maritime Squadron of the Armed Forces of Malta. The ship, which is the Maritime Squadron's largest ever vessel and the lead ship of the OPV748 class, was constructed by the Italian Cantiere Navale Vittoria. It was launched in February 2021 and completed in November 2022. P71 was officially commissioned on 22 March 2023 and replaced P61 as the flagship of the Maritime Squadron.

== Construction ==
In 2015 the Maltese Government wanted to expand the Maritime Squadron as the Diciotti-class P61 was struggling to keep up with the demands faced by patrolling Malta's large SAR Region and its territorial waters, as well as being in need of a major overhaul. Considering the gap that would be left for such as overhaul to take place, the Irish Naval Service donated the LÉ Aoife to help reduce the strains on the P61.

The government issued an invitation to tender for the construction of a new long-distance vessel at least 70 m long and costing about €40 million, to be financed partly by the European Union's Internal Border Funding.

The successful bidder was the Cantiere Navale Vittoria of Adria, in the Veneto of Italy. The contract was publicly signed on 16 January 2019. Originally, building was to start in early 2019, for delivery in late 2020.

On 7 March 2019, it was announced that the contract for the provision of the marine propulsion package for P71 was awarded to Rolls-Royce. The vessel was launched by Cantiere Navale Vittoria on 27 February 2021.

P71 underwent sea-acceptance trials between March 2022 and August 2022, with the official trials following thereafter. The ship, which was the biggest ever warship constructed by Cantiere Navale Vittoria to date, was delivered in November 2022 and on 8 November 2022, it entered Haywharf for the first time. It was officially commissioned on March 22 2023.

Ultimately, the vessel cost €48.6 million to construct.

== Design ==
Artistic impression of P71

P71 is 78.4 metres long, with a beam of 13.0 metres and a maximum draft of 4.8 metres. At full load, P71 will displace 2244 tons. Propulsion is provided by 2 Rolls-Royce PROMAS controllable-pitch propellers, which can allow P71 to reach maximum speeds of over 20 knots (37 km/h; 23 mph). P71 is powered by two Wärtsilä diesel engines with Power-take-in of 5,440 kW (7,300 hp) each.

The vessel has 5 decks. At the front of the main deck, one can find the main gun, a OTO single 25mm calibre Oerlikon KBA remote controlled weapon station. The main feature of P71 is the elevated bridge with 360-degree vision capabilities, which is equipped with ballistic protection according to level 2 of the STANAG 4569. Besides the main gun, P71 is also armed with a 12.7-mm machine gun and two 7.62 mm machine guns. The vessel also has an armoury with ammunition, rifles and pistols.

P71 also has a helicopter deck which caters for the landing and refuelling of seven ton helicopters, like the AgustaWestland AW139 operated by the Air Wing. The vessel is also equipped with two 9.1 metres-long rigid inflatable boats, with one located on the starboard side and the other on the stern. Both RHIBs can reach a maximum speed of 40 knots (64 km/h; 46 mph). It also has an integrated command, control and navigation system, which includes a 2D surveillance radar, a navigation radar and satellite communications.

P71 can accommodate a crew of 40, with space for further 20 Special Operations Unit. Aboard the vessel, one can also find a medical facility where personnel can receive medical treatment. P71 also has additional space for materials which is also accessible via hatches on the flight deck for loading and unloading via a special service crane placed on its side.

The vessel has an endurance of at least 15 days and a range of 2,100kms at 16 knots.
