= C23 tragedy =

1984 explosion in Gozo, Malta

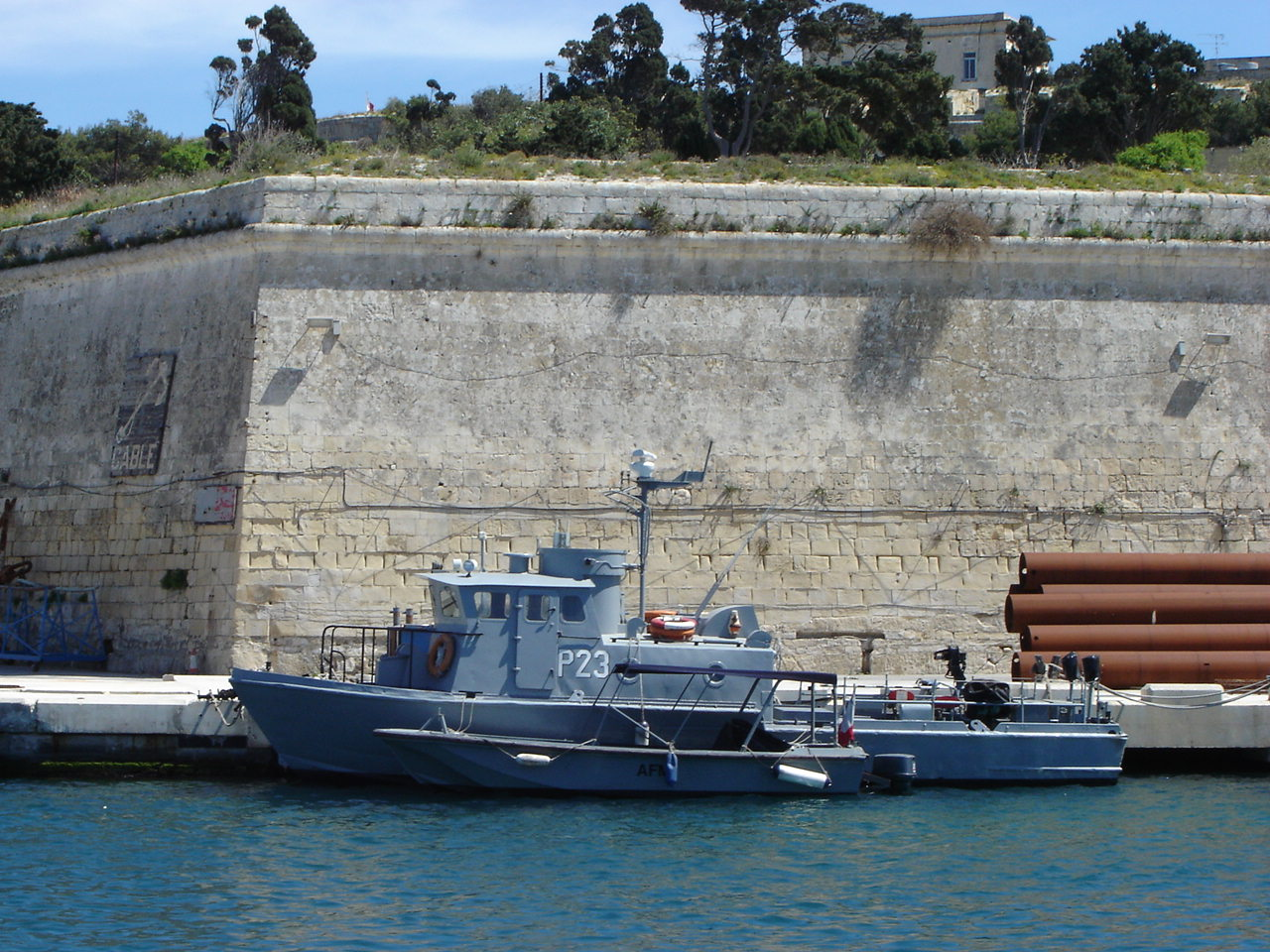
- The patrol boat P23 (ex-C23) moored off Msida Bastion in 2006
- Date: 7 September 1984 (41 years ago)
- Location: off Qala, Gozo, Malta
- Type: Explosion
- Cause: Uncertain, probably a spark
- Deaths: 7
- Injuries: 1

The C23 tragedy occurred on 7 September 1984, when the Swift-class patrol boat C23 of the Maritime Squadron of the Armed Forces of Malta (AFM) was severely damaged by an explosion while dumping illegal fireworks off Qala in Gozo, Malta. Seven people – five soldiers and two policemen – were killed, and the only survivor of the incident was severely injured.

The patrol boat C23 was repaired and it returned to service, later being renamed P23. It was decommissioned in 2010 and it now remains at the AFM base at Hay Wharf as a memorial to those killed in the explosion.

== Background ==
The patrol boat C23 was originally built as PCF 813, a Mark II Patrol Craft Fast for the United States Navy. It was one of two Swift boats which were donated to Malta, the other being PCF 816. Both boats arrived in Malta's Grand Harbour on 6 February 1971 on board the USS Wood County, and were designated as C-6823 and C-6824 respectively. The official handover ceremony took place on 5 April 1971, and they were designated C23 and C24.

They were the first vessels to be operated by the Maritime Troop of the Malta Land Force upon its establishment in November 1970.

The Maritime Troop was renamed a number of times, acquiring its present name Maritime Squadron of the Armed Forces of Malta in 1980.

== Explosion ==
The explosion took place on 7 September 1984, during a routine operation while dumping illegal fireworks about 2 miles (3.2 km) off Qala Point in Gozo. The fireworks had been seized by The Malta Police Force from the limits of Żabbar a day earlier. The exact cause of the explosion is not known, but it is believed to have occurred when a spark caused by the closing of a hatch blew up the fireworks that were on the boat's deck.

Five soldiers and two policemen on the boat were killed, leaving only one survivor who managed to beach the boat on the island of Comino and raise the alarm despite being injured. The deceased were aged between 20 and 36.

== Aftermath ==
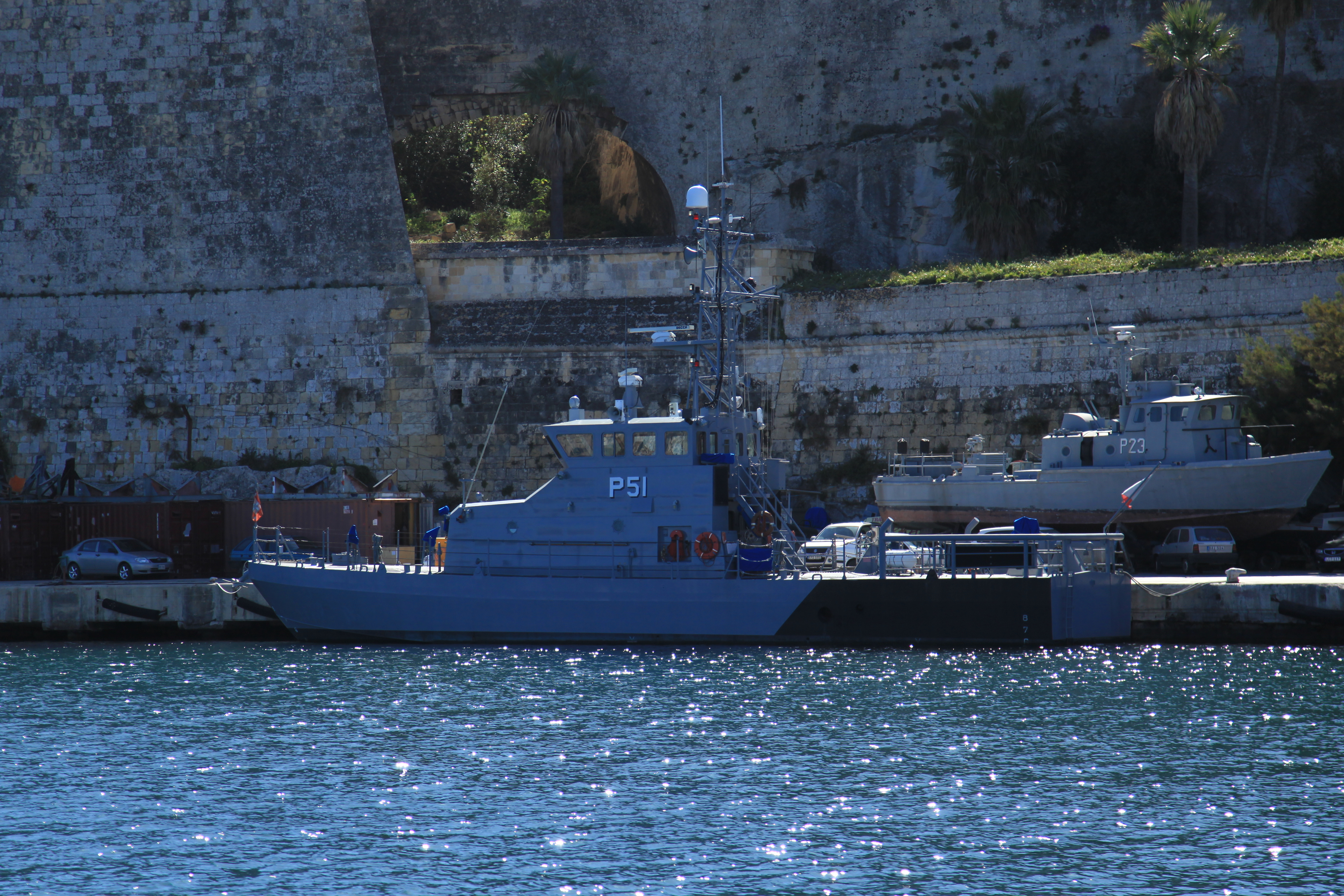
P23 laid up at Hay Wharf in 2013, with the Protector-class P51 moored nearby

Five of the seven bodies were found after the explosion, three by a helicopter and two by a patrol boat. The bodies retrieved by the helicopter were taken to the Gozo General Hospital. The day after the incident, 8 September (a public holiday, Victory Day), was declared as a day of national mourning. The bodies were brought to Malta on board the patrol boats C28 and C29, and they were given a military funeral which was attended by thousands of people. The flag-draped coffins left St. Luke's Hospital, and the funeral was led by a 48-man guard of honour from the AFM's Task Force.

The explosion caused a change in policy, with fireworks no longer being carried on patrol boats but on towed barges. Today, disposal of illegal explosives is no longer carried out by AFM patrol boats.

The damaged patrol boat C23 was towed to the Manoel Island Yacht Yard, where it was repaired by having its bow rebuilt. It subsequently reentered service with the Maritime Squadron. It was later renamed P23, and it was decommissioned on 18 April 2010. The boat is now located at the Squadron's base at Hay Wharf in Floriana as a memorial. Its sister ship C24 (later renamed P24) was decommissioned at the same time and it was donated to the Maritime Museum of San Diego in 2011. The ship was replaced by another P-23 vessel.

A monument was built at Hay Wharf shortly after the event, and a new one was unveiled on the occasion of the 25th anniversary in 2009. Another memorial is located at the Maritime Museum of San Diego.

The explosion was the worst peacetime tragedy suffered by the Armed Forces and the Police.
