= List of ship commissionings in 2010 =

The list of ship commissionings in 2010 includes a chronological list of all ships commissioned in 2010.

	Operator	Ship	Flag	Class and type	Pennant	Other notes
16 January	United States Navy	Independence		Independence-class littoral combat ship	LCS-2	
25 January	Brazilian Navy	Aspirante Moura			U-14	
10 February	Chilean Navy	Almirante Montt		Henry J. Kaiser-class replenishment oiler	AO-52	
14 February	Iraqi Navy	Majeb			703	
14 February	Iraqi Navy	Shimookh			704	
19 February	Islamic Republic of Iran Navy	Jamaran		Moudge-class frigate	76	
6 March	United States Navy	Dewey		Arleigh Burke-class destroyer	DDG-105	
12 March	Lithuanian Naval Force	Aukštaitis		Flyvefisken-class patrol vessel	P14	
18 March	(Malta) Maritime Squadron AFM	P21		P21-class patrol vessel	P21	
18 March	(Malta) Maritime Squadron AFM	P22		P21-class patrol vessel	P22	
18 March	(Malta) Maritime Squadron AFM	P23		P21-class patrol vessel	P23	
18 March	(Malta) Maritime Squadron AFM	P24		P21-class patrol vessel	P24	
27 March	United States Navy	New Mexico		Virginia-class submarine	SSN-779	
29 April	Indian Navy	Shivalik		Shivalik-class frigate	F47	First in class
7 May	United States Coast Guard	Waesche		Legend-class cutter	WMSL-751	
8 May	Russian Navy	Sankt Peterburg		Lada-class submarine	B-585	First in class
3 June	Royal Navy	Dauntless		Type 45 destroyer	D33	
25 August	(United States) National Oceanic and Atmospheric Administration	Bell M. Shimada		Oscar Dyson-class fisheries research ship	R 227	
27 August	Royal Navy	Astute		Astute-class submarine	S119	First in class
13 November	United States Navy	Jason Dunham		Arleigh Burke-class destroyer	DDG-109	
20 November	United States Navy	Gravely		Arleigh Burke-class destroyer	DDG-107	
