= List of ship commissionings in 2004 =

The list of ship commissionings in 2004 includes a chronological list of ships commissioned in 2004. In cases where no official commissioning ceremony was held, the date of service entry may be used instead.

Date	Operator	Ship	Class and type	Notes
March 18	Japan Maritime Self-Defense Force	Makinami (DD-112)	Takanami-class destroyer	
April 19	Indian Navy	Tabar (F44)	Talwar-class frigate	
April 22	Royal Netherlands Navy	De Ruyter (F804)	De Zeven Provinciën-class frigate	
May 29	United States Navy	Pinckney (DDG-91)	Arleigh Burke-class destroyer	
June 26	Royal Australian Navy	Ballarat (FFH 155)	Anzac-class frigate	
July 7	Indian Navy	Betwa (F39)	Brahmaputra-class frigate	
July 7	(Malta) Maritime Squadron AFM	P52	Protector-class coastal patrol boat	
August 28	United States Navy	Momsen (DDG-92)	Arleigh Burke-class destroyer	
September 18	United States Navy	Chung-Hoon (DDG-93)	Arleigh Burke-class destroyer	
October 19	Royal Danish Navy	Absalon (L16)	Absalon-class auxiliary ship / frigate	
October 23	United States Navy	Virginia (SSN-774)	Virginia-class submarine	
December 10	Royal Navy	Bulwark (L15)	Albion-class landing platform dock	
December 11	United States Navy	James E. Williams (DDG-95)	Arleigh Burke-class destroyer	
