= Diciotti-class offshore patrol vessel =

Italian-designed offshore patrol vessel

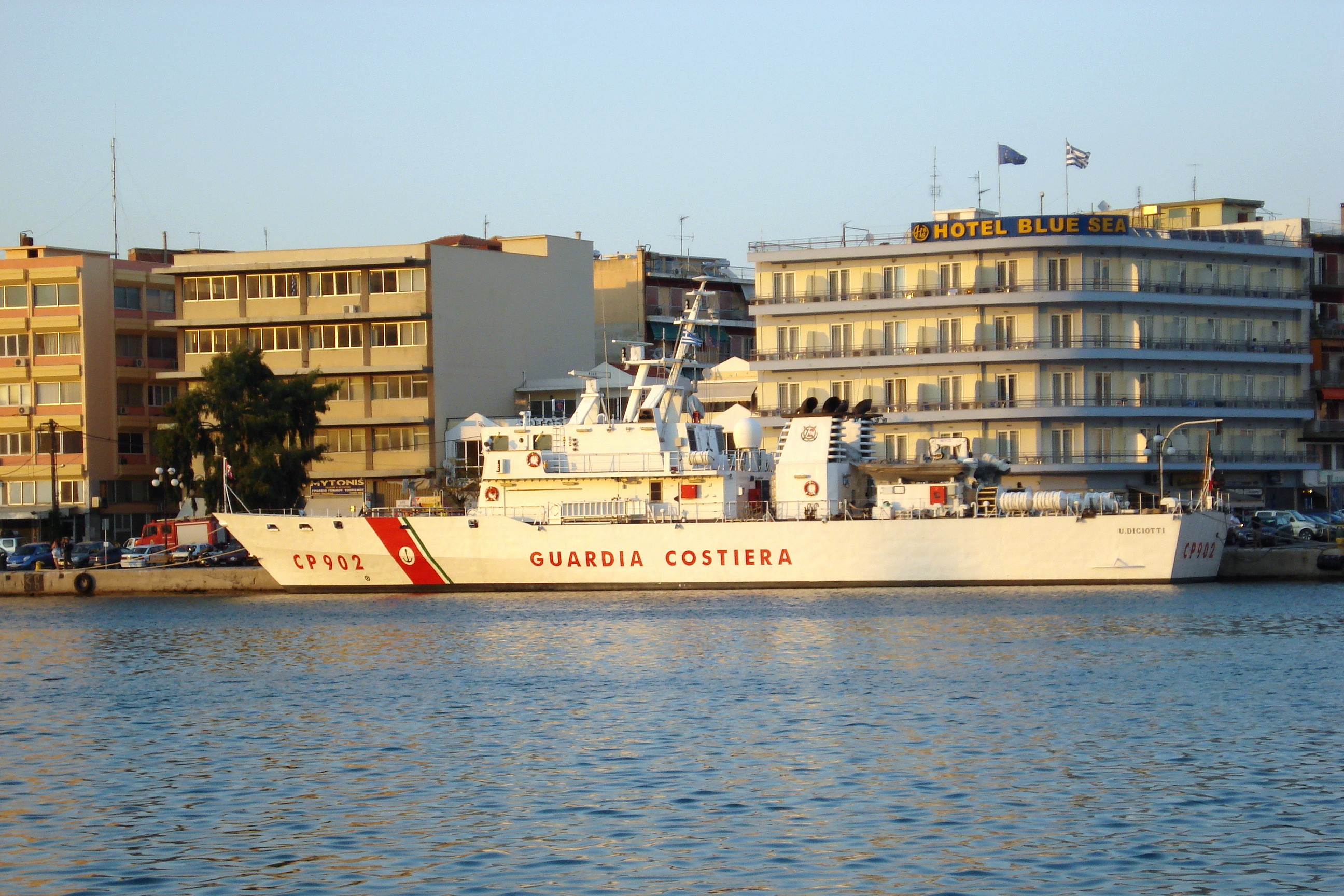
- CP-902 U. Diciotti in Mitillini Harbour, Greece

Class overview
- Name: Saettia class
- Builders: Fincantieri to Muggiano and Riva Trigoso (La Spezia) shipyards
- Operators: (Italy) Italian Coast Guard (Saettia Mk1 and Saettia Mk2); Iraqi Navy (Saettia Mk4); (Malta) Maritime Squadron AFM (Saettia Mk3); Panamanian Public Forces (Saettia Mk2)
- Preceded by: Kondor I-class (Malta)
- Subclasses: Malta - P61; Iraq - Saettia MK4
- Built: 1984-2009
- In commission: 1999-2009
- Planned: Italy: 6, Malta: 1, Iraq: 4
- Building: Italy: 6, Malta: 1, Iraq: 4
- Completed: Italy: 6, Malta: 1, Iraq: 4
- Active: Italy: 4, Malta: 1, Iraq: 2, Panama: 2

General characteristics
- Class & type: Saettia Mk1
- Displacement: 390 t (380 long tons)
- Length: - 51.7 m (170 ft) LOA; - 47.2 m (155 ft) LPP
- Beam: 8.10 m (26.6 ft)
- Draft: 2.1 m (6.9 ft)
- Propulsion: - 4 x shafts with variable-pitch propellers; - 4 x diesel engines MTU 16V538TIB93, 13,000 kW (17,000 bhp); - 3 x diesel engines generators Isotta Fraschini L1306 T2 ME, 3 x 150 kW (200 bhp)
- Speed: 40 knots (74 km/h)
- Range: 1,800 nautical miles (3,300 km) at 18 knots (33 km/h)
- Boats & landing craft carried: 2 x RHIBs
- Complement: 29
- Sensors & processing systems: - 2 navigation radar, X and S band, GEM Elettronica SPN-753; - IRST fire control system
- Armament: 1 × Otobreda KBA 25/80 mm; 2 x 12.7mm MGs

General characteristics
- Class & type: Saettia Mk2
- Displacement: 427.0 t (420.3 long tons), full load
- Length: - 52.8 m (173 ft) LOA; - 47.2 m (155 ft) LPP
- Beam: 8.10 m (26.6 ft)
- Draft: 2.1 m (6.9 ft)
- Depth: 5.4 m (18 ft)
- Propulsion: - 2 x shafts with variable-pitch propellers; - 4 × diesel engines Isotta Fraschini V1716 T2 MSD, 4 x 2,360 kW (3,160 bhp); - 3 x diesel engines generators Isotta Fraschini L1306 T2 ME, 3 x 208 kW (279 bhp); - 1 x emergency diesel engines generator; - 1 x bow thruster
- Speed: max 31 knots (57 km/h)
- Range: 1,800 nautical miles (3,300 km) at 16 knots (30 km/h)
- Endurance: 7 days
- Boats & landing craft carried: 2 x RHIBs
- Complement: 29
- Sensors & processing systems: - 2 navigation radar, X and S band, GEM Elettronica SPN-753XS(V)2; - IRST fire control system GEM Elettronica EOSS/100
- Armament: 1 × Oerlikon 20/70 mm; 2 x 12.7mm MGs
- Notes: VERTREP capability

General characteristics
- Class & type: Saettia Mk3
- Displacement: 391.0 t (384.8 long tons), full load
- Length: - 53.4 m (175 ft) LOA; - 47.2 m (155 ft) LPP
- Beam: 8.10 m (26.6 ft)
- Draft: 2.1 m (6.9 ft)
- Depth: 5.4 m (18 ft)
- Propulsion: - 2 x shafts with variable-pitch propellers; - 2 × diesel engines Isotta Fraschini V1716 T2 MSD, 2 x 2,360 kW (3,160 bhp) (since 2017 replaced with Caterpillar 3516C engines, 2,350 kW (3,150 bhp)); - 3 x diesel engines generators Isotta Fraschini L1306 T2 ME, 3 x 208 kW (279 bhp); - 1 x bow thruster
- Speed: 23 knots (43 km/h)
- Range: 2,100 nautical miles (3,900 km) at 16 knots (30 km/h)
- Boats & landing craft carried: 1 x 7 meter RHIB
- Complement: 25
- Sensors & processing systems: Surface Search E/F-Band; Navigation I-Band
- Armament: - 1 × OTO Melara 25/80 gun with Oerlikon KBA 25mm; - 2 x 12.7mm MGs
- Aviation facilities: flight deck for 1 x medium helicopter (AB-212 class)

General characteristics
- Class & type: Saettia Mk4
- Displacement: 401.0 t (394.7 long tons), full load
- Length: - 53.4 m (175 ft) LOA; - 47.2 m (155 ft) LPP
- Beam: 8.10 m (26.6 ft)
- Draft: 2.1 m (6.9 ft)
- Depth: 5.40 m (17.7 ft)
- Propulsion: - 2 shafts with variable-pitch propellers; - 2 × diesel engines Isotta Fraschini V1716 T2 MSD, 2 x 2,360 kW (3,160 bhp); - 3 x diesel engines generators Isotta Fraschini L1306 T2 ME, 2 x 208 kW (279 bhp); - 1 x emergency diesel engines generator
- Speed: 23 knots (43 km/h)
- Range: 2,100 nautical miles (3,900 km) at 16 knots (30 km/h)
- Boats & landing craft carried: 1 x 11 meter RHIB on stern ramp + 1 x 5 meter RHIB
- Complement: 38
- Sensors & processing systems: Surface Search E/F-Band; Navigation I-Band
- Armament: 1 × Otobreda Marlin 30 mm; 2 x 12.7mm MGs

The Diciotti class is an Italian-designed offshore patrol vessel, presently in use with the Italian Coast Guard, Iraqi Navy, Armed Forces of Malta and Panama SENAN. These ships are designed and built by Fincantieri on the bay of La Spezia to Muggiano and Riva Trigoso shipyards.

== Italian Coast Guard (Saettia Mk1 and Mk2) ==
Based on the earlier experimental Saettia class (Saettia MK1), the Diciotti class (Saettia MK2) is an advanced and improved version with a longer length, more power and hence greater patrol endurance.

== Malta - Maritime Squadron AFM (Saettia Mk3) ==
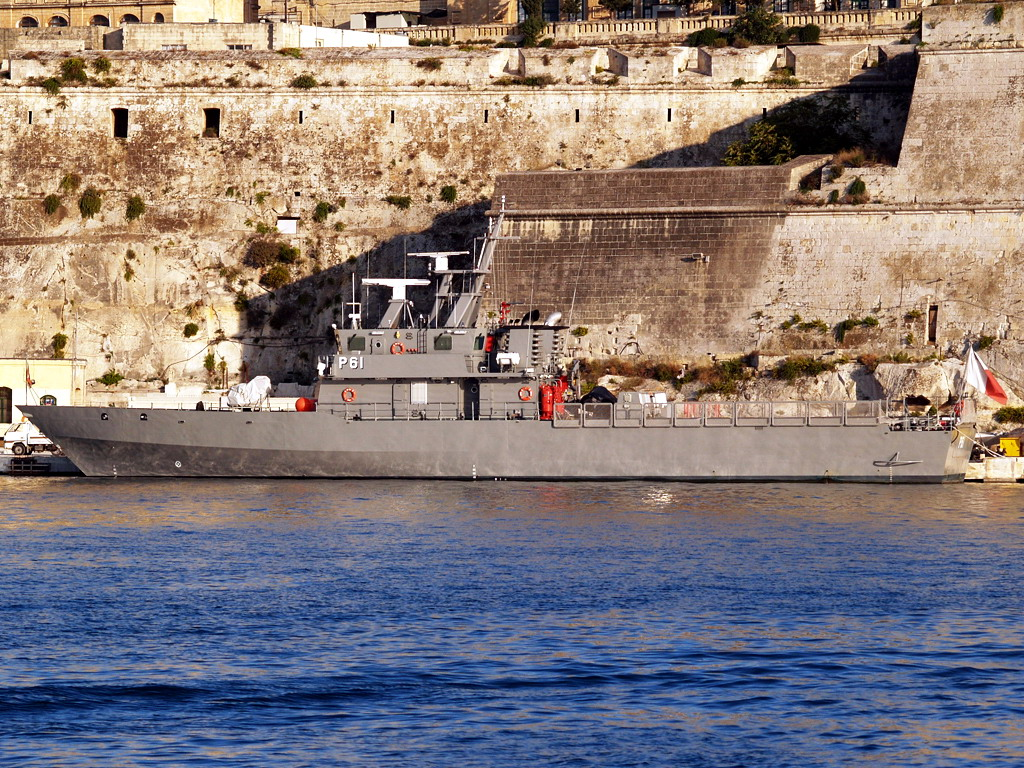
P61 in 2006

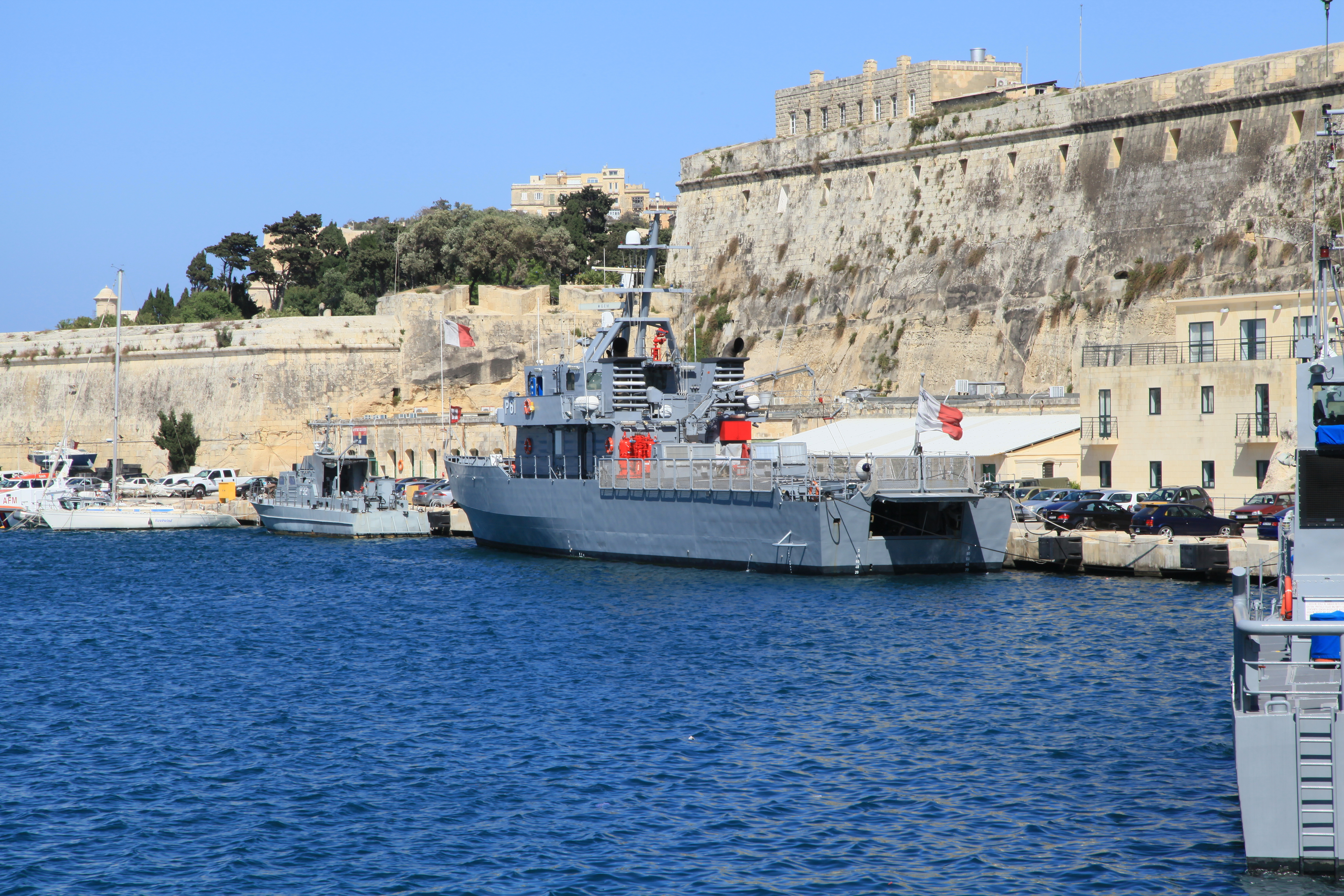
P61 at Hay Wharf, with the rear launching ramp visible.

In 2003, the Armed Forces of Malta ordered a replacement for the former East German Kondor class patrol boats P29, P30 and P31, due to the increase in flow of refugees from North Africa to Europe.

The design for P61 (Saettia MK3) provides a clear rear half to the ship, providing sufficient space with reinforcement to land a helicopter, up to the size of an AW139. P61 has the capability of carrying out patrols up to Sea State 5, and withstand sea conditions up to Sea State 7. It can launch a rib patrol boat via a rear launch ramp up to Sea State 4. This combination of modifications increases vessel weight to 450-tonnes, and reduces standard crew capacity to 25. Maximum unrefueled patrol range at 20 knots (37 km/h) is 3,000 nautical miles (5,600 km).

The €17m Euros contract, financed entirely from the 5th Italo-Maltese Financial Protocol, covered the construction of the vessel together with an associated training and logistic support package. The ship was commissioned on October 1, 2005 and operational from November 5, 2005. P61 acts as the flagship of the Armed Forces of Malta.

The vessel has been updated in 2017 with overhaul and engine refit (Caterpillar engines replace Isotta Fraschini engines), by Fincantieri, to a cost around €7 million.

On 5 June 2019 the P61 rescued the lives of 147 migrants after they‘ve been sending distress calls in the Maltese SAR area. In total AFM vessels rescued 370 immigrants on one of the busiest days in recent history for the navy. The other migrants were rescued by the P52 and the P21.

On 11 June 2019, P61 rescued 97 migrants and brought them safely to Malta. This rescue comes less than a week after 147 migrants were rescued by this same vessel.

On 24 August 2019, P61 brought to Malta a group of migrants totalling 356. This happened after Malta finally decided to give a safe port to these souls that were aboard the NGO vessel Ocean Viking for 14 consecutive days. The Maltese government said that all of the migrants will be relocated to other EU countries. This group happens to be the biggest arrival of the year to date.

On 13 September 2023, P61 left Malta for Libya on an aid mission after the catastrophic damage caused to the coastal city of Derna by Medicane Daniel. Onboard the vessel there was 73 first responders which included 31 CPD members, 12 soldiers that includes doctors and nurses and the 30 member crew manning the boat. Two rescue vehicles and a dinghy were also onboard.

P61 returned back to base at Malta on the 17th of September with all the 73 members of the aid squad returning safely to their home country.

== Iraq (Saettia MK4) ==
In 2006, the new Iraqi Navy signed a contract with the Italian Government to purchase four modified Diciotti class vessels to patrol its 58 kilometre coast line.

The vessels are to be built by Fincantieri at Riva Trigoso, with modifications including increased crew capacity of 38. The contract also comprises the provision of logistical support and crew training with each crew completing a 7-week training course. In cooperation with the Marina Militare (Italian Navy), each commissioning crew is provided with a week’s bridge simulator course at the Naval Academy in Livorno.

In May 2009, the first vessel, Patrol Ship 701 named Fatah (Arabic for Victory), was handed over at the Muggiano, La Spezia shipyard. The crew had been training since January 2009, and now headed for Umm Qasr, a 20 day/5,000 nautical mile journey via the Mediterranean, Suez Canal and Red Sea. There, additional training was completed, before the vessel took over duties from the British Royal Marine patrols, who then reverted to training the new crew.

The vessels are used to patrol the exclusive economic zone, control maritime traffic, for search and rescue and fire fighting.

== Panama - SENAN, National Air and Navy Service of Panama (Saettia Mk2) ==
Following an agreement reached in June 2010, Italy delivered CP 902 Ubaldo Diciotti and CP 903 Luigi Dattilo to SENAN - National Air and Navy Service of Panama as P 901 and P 902 in April 2014.

== Vessels ==
(Italy) Italian Coast Guard - Saettia class (Saettia MK1)
Ship	Pennant number	Hull number	Shipyard	Laid Down	Launched	Commissioned	IMO MMSI	Note
Saettia	CP-901	920	Muggiano (La Spezia)	June 1984	December 1984	20 July 1999	223102208; 247702000	ex experimental Fincantieri DA-360T patrol boat
(Italy) Italian Coast Guard - Diciotti class (Saettia MK2)
Ubaldo Diciotti	CP-902	6083	Muggiano (La Spezia)		2001	20 July 2002		in 2014 delivered as P901 to Panamanian Public Forces SENAN, Panama
Luigi Dattilo	CP-903	6084	Muggiano (La Spezia)		2001	30 November 2002		in 2014 delivered as P902 to Panamanian Public Forces SENAN, Panama
Michele Fiorillo	CP-904	6085	Muggiano (La Spezia)		2001	January 2003		
Alfredo Peluso	CP-905	6105	Muggiano (La Spezia)			3 July 2003		
Oreste Corsi	CP-906	6107	Muggiano (La Spezia)			8 January 2004		
Malta - P61 class (Saettia MK3)
P61	P61	6126	Muggiano (La Spezia)		24 June 2005	1 October 2005		
Iraq - Fatah class (Saettia MK4)
Fateh(لفتح)	701	6156	Riva Trigoso (La Spezia)		2009	9 October 2009		
el-Naser (لناصر)	702	6157	Riva Trigoso (La Spezia)		28 January 2009	2 May 2009		
Majid ( ماجد)	703	6158	Muggiano (La Spezia)		15 April 2009	16 December 2009		
Shmookh (شموخ)	704	6159	Muggiano (La Spezia)		15 September 2009	16 December 2009		

== See also ==
- Falaj 2-class patrol vessel - a more heavily armed patrol vessel based on the Diciotti.
