= P21-class patrol vessel =

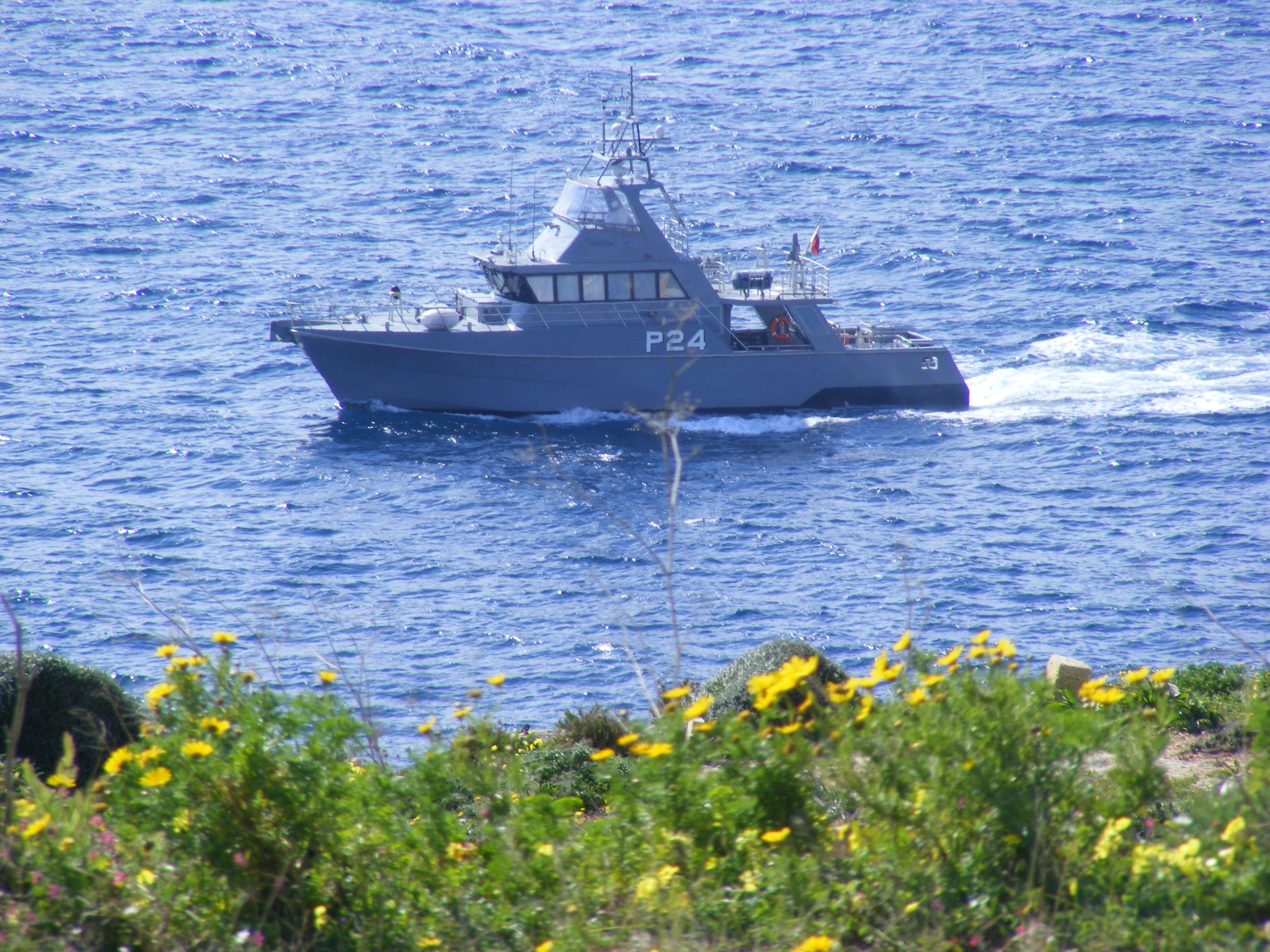
- P24

Class overview
- Builders: Austal, Henderson, Western Australia
- Operators: (Malta) Maritime Squadron AFM
- Preceded by: Swift-class; Bremse-class
- Cost: €9.3 million per unit
- Built: 2009
- In commission: 2010-present
- Completed: 4
- Active: 4

General characteristics
- Type: Inshore patrol vessel
- Displacement: 40.0 t (39.4 long tons)
- Length: 21.2 m (70 ft)
- Beam: 5.5 m (18 ft)
- Draft: 1.83 m (6.0 ft)
- Propulsion: 2 × MAN D2842 LE410 diesel engines each producing 809 kW (1,085 hp) at 2100 rpm; 2 × fixed pitch propellers
- Speed: More than 26 knots (48 km/h; 30 mph)
- Boats & landing craft carried: 3.4 m (11 ft) rigid hull inflatable boat launched from a stern ramp
- Complement: 8
- Armament: 1 × 12.7mm machine gun; 2 × 7.62mm machine guns; Fire fighting water cannon

The P21 class is a class of inshore patrol vessels of the Armed Forces of Malta's Maritime Squadron. They are alternatively known as the Austal class after their builder.

== Development and design ==
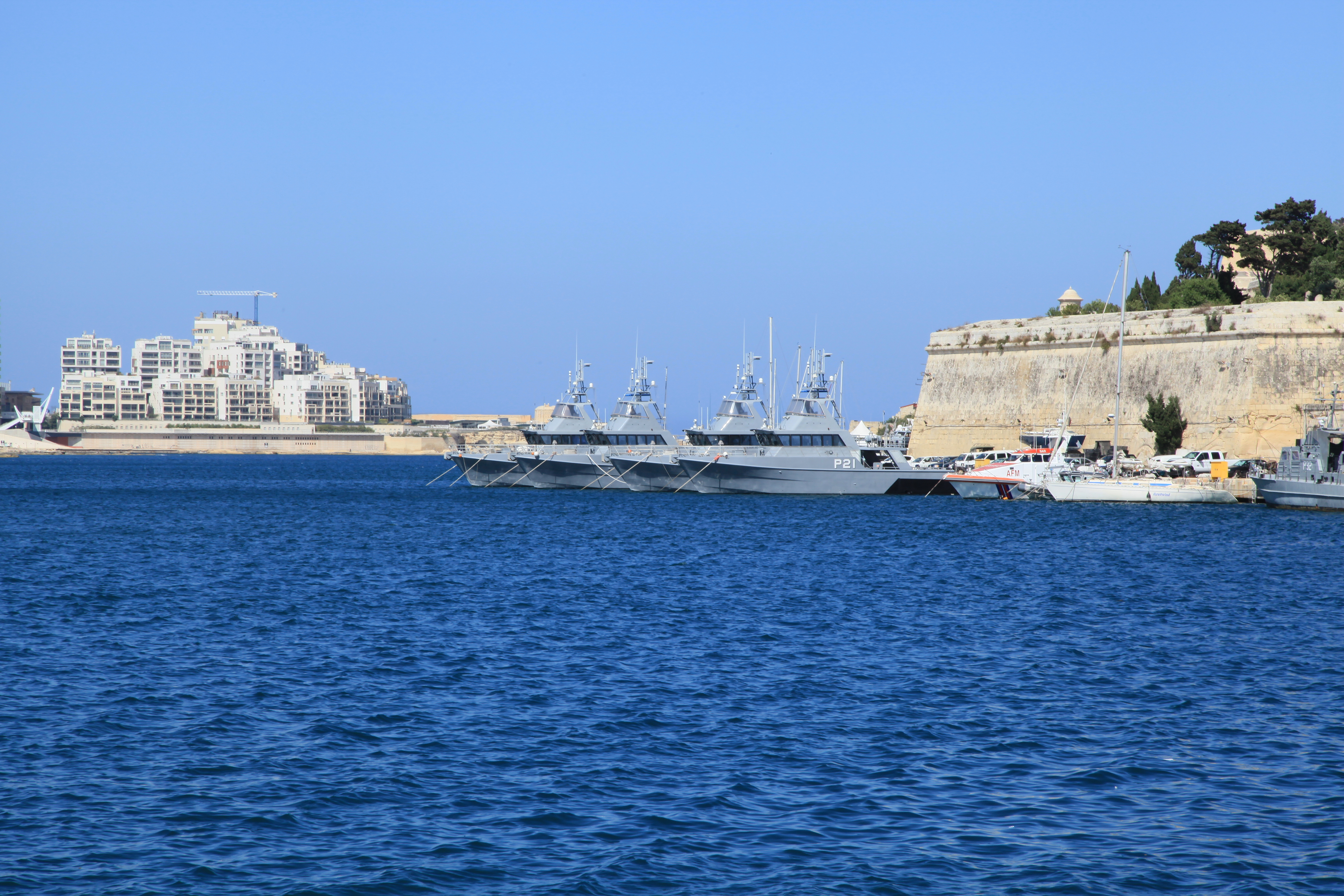
The four patrol boats moored at Hay Wharf in 2014.

The Maltese ordered four boats in 2009 from Australian shipyard Austal. They were due to replace the Swift-class patrol boats P23 and P24 which had been in commission since 1971 and the Bremse-class patrol boat P32 which had been in commission since 1992. The new vessels were built to Maltese specifications and were partly financed by the EU.

The first two vessels were launched in October 2009. All four vessels were delivered to Malta in late 2009, and were officially commissioned on 18 March 2010.

The vessels are armed with machine guns and they mount a firefighting water cannon on the aft fly bridge. They are mainly used for search and rescue purposes, border patrol and to rescue illegal immigrants.

== Service history ==
=== P21 ===
P21 takes part in various rescue operations, for example in July 2010 she took part in the search for a woman who had been reported missing. The woman was found hiding in a cave after she swam there she was surrounded by jellyfish.

The patrol boat also regularly takes part in rescuing illegal immigrants, such as the rescue of 11 migrants in September 2012 along with the patrol boats P22 and P32.

P21 also responded to the attempted hijacking of a tanker by migrants on 28 March 2019.

On 25 May 2019, P21 assisted the P52 with the rescue of 216 migrants after distress calls were received from 2 rubber dinghies during the night. Both dinghies were inside Maltese territorial waters.

On 5 June 2019, P21 made 2 rescue operations in what turned out to be a busy day for the navy. P21 responded to a group of migrants that required rescuing. The vessel firstly disembarked 63 of the migrants and then went back to rescue a further 61 migrants that couldn’t fit on the vessel. In total the vessel rescued 124 migrants. On the day P52 and P61 were also involved in further rescue operations that resulted in the navy rescuing 370 migrants in total.

On 25 July 2019 P21 was again on hand to rescue a group of 76 migrants that were found in distress in the Maltese SAR zone.

On 12 August 2019 P21 evacuated 8 migrants from the NGO vessel Open Arms. The vessel carried 160 migrants which remained in limbo until a safe port was provided. The group of 8 migrants were extracted due to their ailing health which were brought to Malta aboard the P21.

=== P22 ===
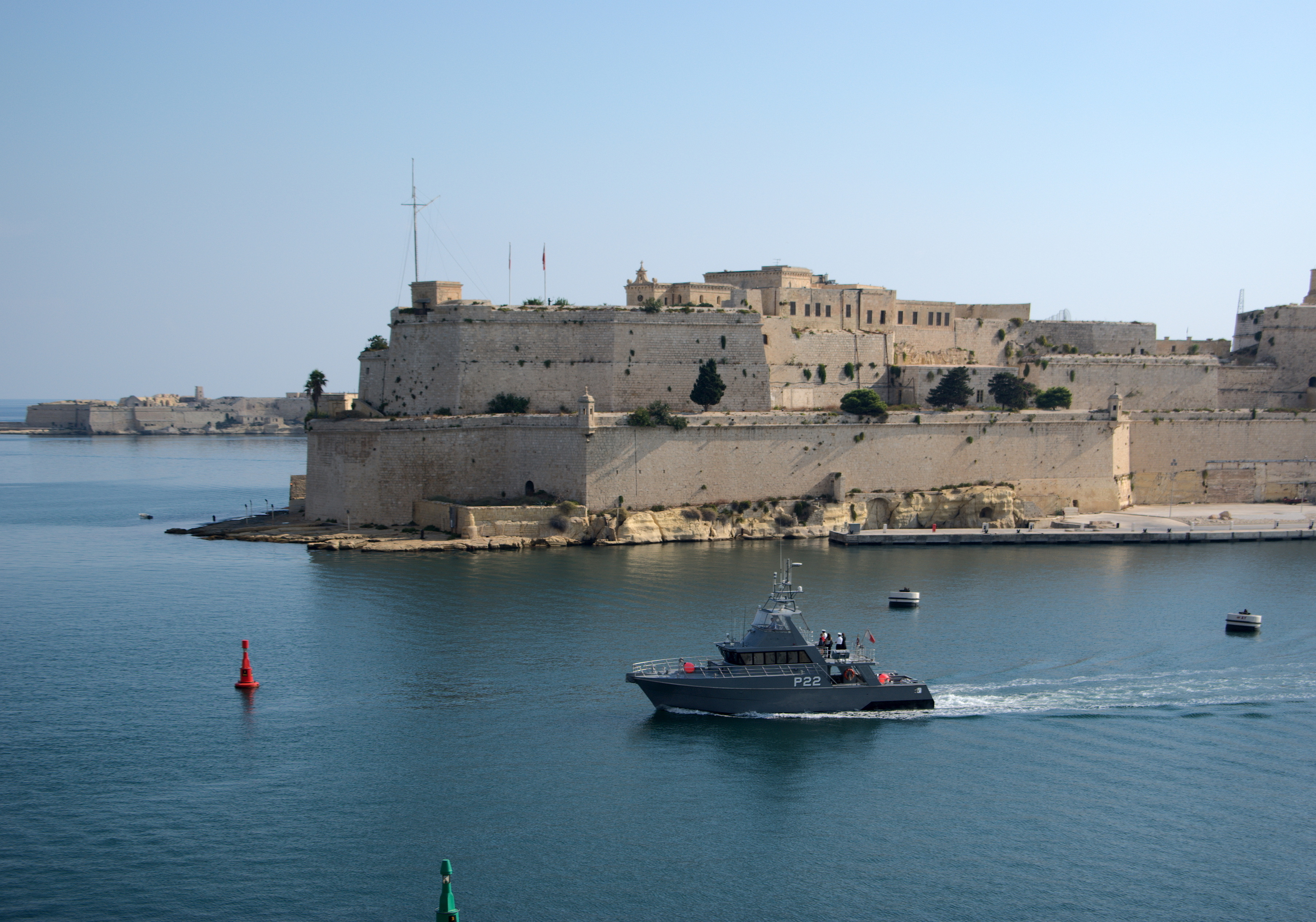
P22 near Fort St. Angelo in the Grand Harbour.

In September 2012 P22 intercepted a boat full of illegal immigrants about 25 nautical miles south of Malta and rescued 11 of them. Another 30 people on board the boat refused assistance and continued their journey north.

On 29 May 2019 P22 rescued a group of 75 immigrants clinging to a tuna fish pen. They’ve been at sea for the previous 3 days before being saved by the Armed Forces of Malta. The immigrants entered port early the following morning.

=== P23 ===
P23 takes part in various rescue operations. Her captain and crew were praised twice in August 2011, the first time for helping return a drifting cabin cruiser back to the port, and the second time for helping and escorting a family whose boat came in distress in rough seas.

On 23 June 2019, P23 rescued 24 migrants that were close to shore, near Birzebbuga. The migrants were found on a dinghy and the majority of 16 were all aged 3–16years old.

On 26 July 2019, P23 came to the aid of another group of migrants, this time numbering a total of 67 men. The rescue happened while the vessel was on a regular patrol. This extraction happened just a day after P21 rescued another 76 migrants in similar conditions.

On 4 August 2019, P23 entered port carrying another group of 40 migrants that were transferred from the NGO ship Alan Kurdi. The NGO vessel was due to enter the port of Lampedusa however the Italian authorities refused to provide a safe port. The Maltese government then allowed the 40 migrants to be brought to Malta, only after finalizing a deal with the EU which will take all the 40 migrants. None will remain in Malta. For the 1983 explosion that occurred on the older counterpart of the P23, see the article on the C23 tragedy.

=== P24 ===
In July 2012, the Austal-class P24 towed its predecessor, the decommissioned Swift-class P24 (formerly known as C24), from the AFM base at Haywharf in Floriana to the Malta Freeport in a handover ceremony. From here the decommissioned Swift boat was taken to San Diego where it was restored and placed in the Maritime Museum of San Diego.

In November 2012 P24 collided with a small boat in Marsamxett Harbour. The small boat sank but the man on board jumped and was picked up unhurt by the crew of the patrol boat. The boat was then lifted with slight damage and an inquiry was held.

On 27 June 2019 P24 rescued a group of 66 migrants and brought them safely to Hay Wharf naval base, were they handed over to the police. Favourable weather is a big factor in the huge number of migrants arriving in Malta.

On 9 July 2019, P24 rescued a group of 44 migrants that were found in distress during the night in the Maltese SAR zone. Amongst the saved there were 4 women and 3 children. The migrants were firstly saved by the Alan Kurdi and then transferred to the patrol boat.

On 26 August 2019, P24 ferried into harbour a group of 73 migrants that were found in Malta's SAR zone aboard a small dinghy. Later on that day the AFM rescued another group of 89 migrants in a similar situation. That brings the total rescued for the day to 162 migrants.
