= Maritime Squadron of the Armed Forces of Malta =

- Skwadra Marittima tal-Forzi Armati ta' Malta
- Coat of arms of the Maritime Squadron
- Active: 1970–present
- Country: Malta
- Branch: Armed Forces of Malta
- Type: Navy
- Role: Maritime surveillance, maritime law enforcement and search and rescue
- Size: 10 vessels 6 boats
- Garrison/HQ: Hay Wharf, Floriana
- Colours: Red; White
- Website: Official website

Commanders
- Lieutenant Colonel: Joseph Gatt

Insignia
- Naval ensign

- Naval jack

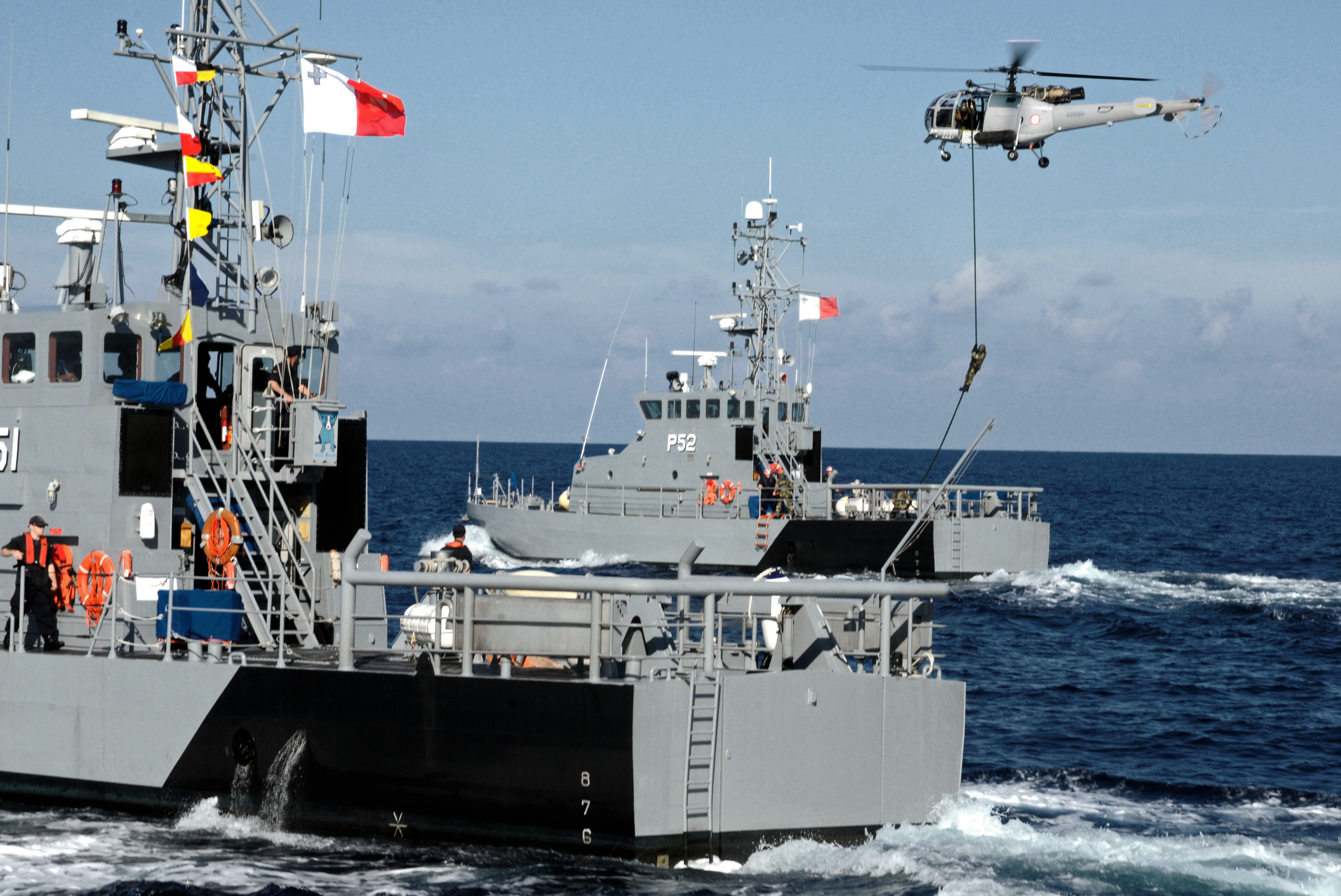
Protector-class patrol boats on an anti-piracy training mission in 2011.

The Maritime Squadron of the Armed Forces of Malta (Maltese: Skwadra Marittima tal-Forzi Armati ta' Malta) is the naval component of the Maltese military. The Maritime Squadron has responsibility for the security of Maltese territorial waters, maritime surveillance and law enforcement, as well as search and rescue. It is based at Hay Wharf in Floriana.

The Maritime Squadron was established in November 1970 as the Maritime Troop of the Malta Land Force. Its name changed a number of times:

- Maritime Troop of the Malta Land Force (1970–1971)
- 1st (Maritime) Battery of the Malta Land Force (1971–1973)
- 1st (Maritime) Battery of the Armed Forces of Malta (1973–1980)
- Maritime Squadron of the Armed Forces of Malta (1980–present)

== History ==
Malta's first navy was built when it was under the Order of Saint John. It was a powerful navy with ships such as the Santa Anna. The Order participated in various naval exploits against the Ottoman Empire while based in Malta, most notably the Battle of Lepanto of 1571 and the Battle of the Dardanelles of 1656. In the 17th and early 18th centuries Maltese vessels also went for corsairing expeditions against Muslim ships. Eventually corsairing decreased and the Order was weak and bankrupt, so there was little resistance when Napoleon landed on Malta in 1798. The Order's navy, including the ships of the line San Zaccharia and San Giovanni, was integrated into the French navy and Malta no longer had its own naval force.

Soon after the British occupied the island, the Mediterranean Fleet of the Royal Navy transferred its base to Malta. Malta became a hub of naval activity due to its harbours and strategic position, and it remained so during the Second World War and until the 1960s. The Mediterranean Fleet was disbanded in 1967, and three years later Malta's first naval force appeared after over 150 years. The Maritime Troop of the Malta Land Force was established in November 1970 and two Swift boats were transferred to Malta from the United States Coast Guard in January 1971. In July 1971 the force was renamed 1st (Maritime) Battery of the Malta Land Force and was based in Senglea. In the 1970s, the number of patrol boats increased as West Germany and Libya gave Malta some of their former customs launches. In 1973 a vessel built at the Malta Drydocks for the Customs Department was taken over by the Maritime Battery.

In 1977, the Battery moved to its present base at Hay Wharf, or Xatt it-Tiben. In 1978, the British gave Malta two search and rescue launches, and in 1979 they left Malta completely, handing over all their former responsibilities to the Battery. On 1 April 1980 it was renamed Maritime Squadron of the Armed Forces of Malta, as it is today. In the 1980s and 1990s, Yugoslavia, the United States, Italy gave more vessels to Malta. Malta purchased patrol boats for the first time in 1992, when former East German minesweepers and patrol boats were bought from Germany. The Swift, Kondor and Bremse classes from the 1960s and 1970s were all decommissioned between 2004 and 2012 as new vessels replaced them.

The worst peacetime incident of the Maritime Squadron was the C23 tragedy on 7 September 1984. Illegal fireworks which were to be dumped from a patrol boat exploded, killing five soldiers and two policemen.

On 18 February 2015 it was announced that the Emer class offshore patrol vessel LÉ Aoife (P22) would be transferred from the Irish Naval Service as a short term measure pending Malta's purchase of a new OPV. It was commissioned into the AFM on 28 June 2015 as P62.

A new base for the Maritime Squadron is currently being built, also at Hay Wharf.

== Current structure ==
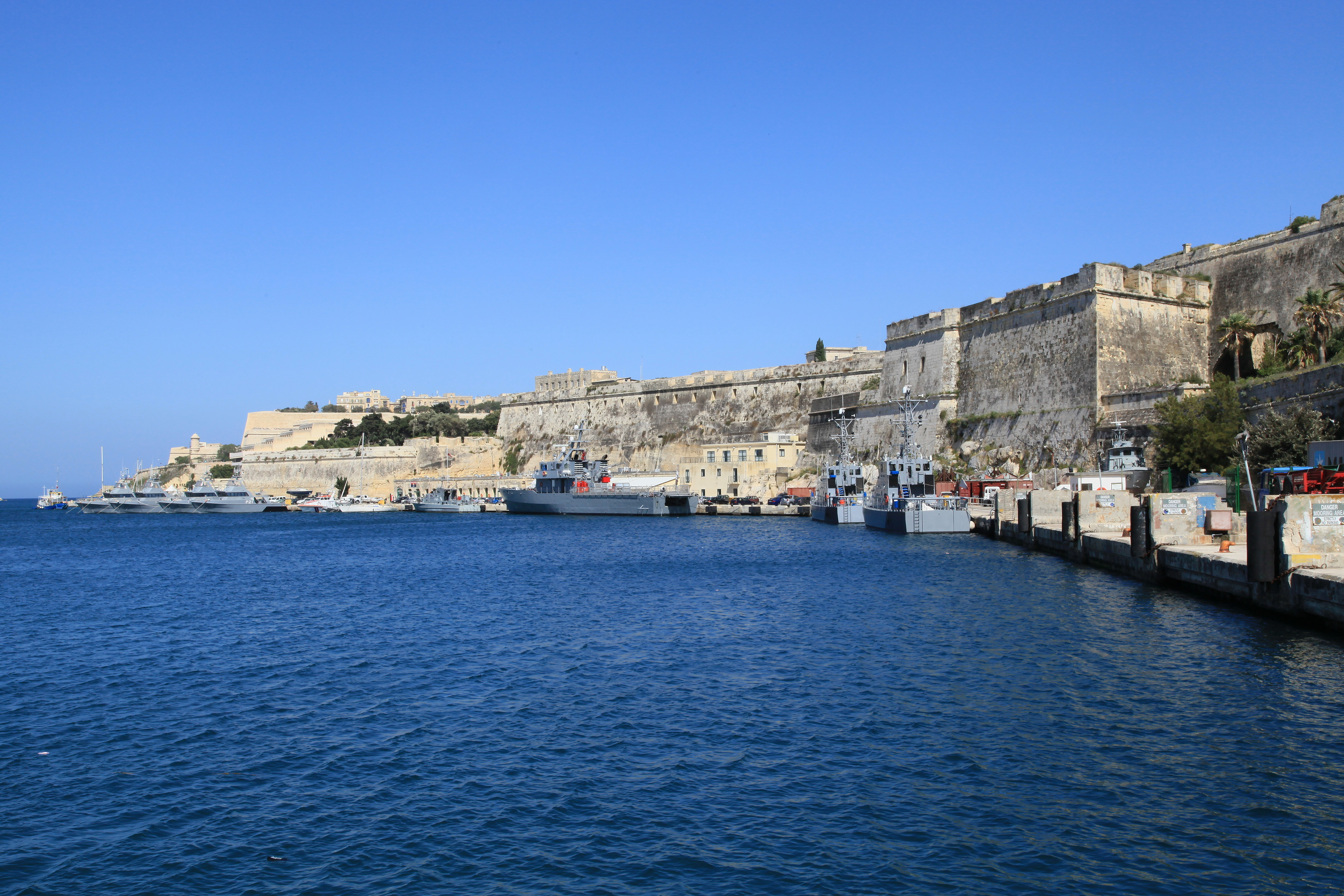
The AFM base at Hay Wharf.

=== Headquarters Command ===
The Headquarters Command is responsible for base security, transportation and anything necessary for sustaining the patrol boats throughout the year. It is therefore responsible for the supply of all the fuel and ammunition.

=== Offshore Command ===
The Offshore Command operates the Protector-class P51 and P52 and the modified Diciotti class vessel P61. The Offshore command formerly operated the Kondor I-class P29, P30 and P31 vessels until these were decommissioned in 2004.

=== Inshore Command ===
The Inshore Command operates the four P21-class patrol boats, as well as the Search and Rescue launches Melita I and Melita II. The Command also includes the Rapid Deployment Platoon who operate using any of the Inshore Command vessels, the fast interceptors such as P01 or using aircraft from the Air Wing.

=== G Command ===
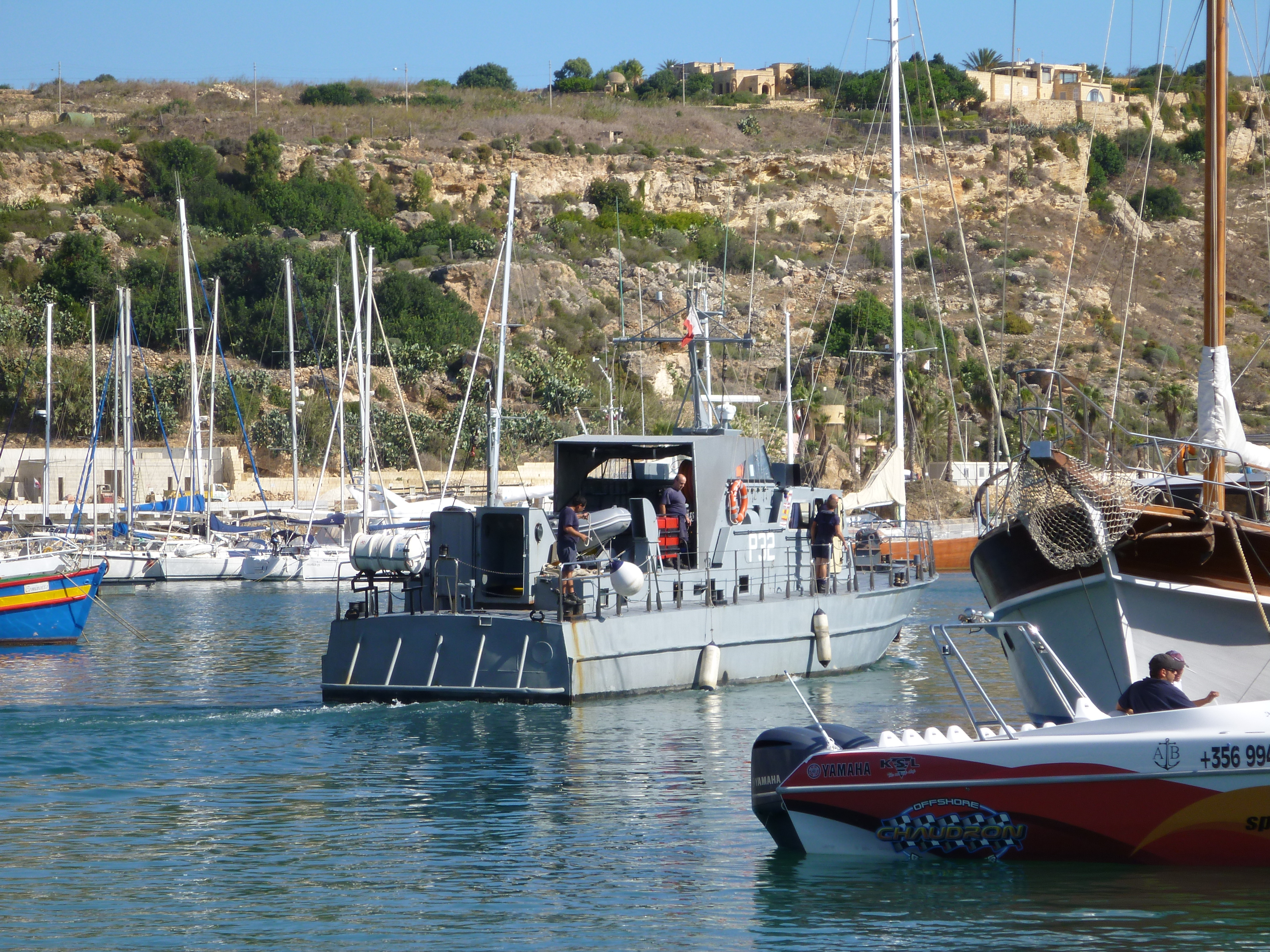
Patrol boat P32 at Mġarr, Gozo.

G Command is responsible for military activity on the island of Gozo. The Land Component consists of a platoon strong element which provide assistance to the Malta Police and various Government departments, as well as securing the territorial integrity of Gozo. The Maritime Component consisted of three crews operating the Bremse-class patrol boat P32 around Mġarr Harbour. P32 was decommissioned in 2012 and now the G Command operates a single Melita Class SAR Launch and a Defender Class CPB.

=== Support Command ===
Support Command is responsible for the upkeep of the maritime craft and equipment. It also incorporates equipment and supply management.

== Vessels of the AFM ==
=== Current fleet ===
These vessels are in active service as of 2015:

Class	Photo	Type	Ships	Origin	Commissioned	Note
Search and rescue launches (2 in service)
Supervittoria 800 class		Search and rescue launches	Melita I	Italy	1999	Built in 1998 by Vittoria Naval Shipyard, Adria/Rovigo, Italy
Supervittoria 800 class		Search and rescue launches	Melita II	Italy	1999	Built in 1998 by Vittoria Naval Shipyard, Adria/Rovigo, Italy
Boats (6 in service)
FB Interceptor class		Rigid-hulled inflatable boat	P01	Italy	2006	Built at FB Design in Annone Brianza (Lecco) - Italy. It is used by the Rapid Deployment Team (RDT), the unit tasked to perform M.L.E. (Maritime Law Enforcement) operations and counter terrorism interventions at sea.
Boomeranger (Model 1100) class		Rigid-hulled inflatable boat	P02	Finland	2012	Purchased from EBF Funding. Manufactured by Boomeranger Boats Oy Limited
Boomeranger (Model 1100) class		Rigid-hulled inflatable boat	P03	Finland	2012	Purchased from EBF Funding. Manufactured by Boomeranger Boats Oy Limited
Boomeranger (Model 1100) class		Rigid-hulled inflatable boat	P04	Finland	2012	Purchased from EBF Funding. Manufactured by Boomeranger Boats Oy Limited
Defender class		Boat	P05	United States	2014	Built by SAFE Boats International and donated by the US Government
Defender class		Boat	P06	United States	2014	Built by SAFE Boats International and donated by the US Government
Patrol vessels (8 in service)
Austal class		Inshore patrol vessel	P21	Australia	2010	Ordered in February 2009 and built by Austal, Perth. Two of them were launched on 6 October 2009 and they were delivered in February 2010.
Austal class		Inshore patrol vessel	P22	Australia	2010	Ordered in February 2009 and built by Austal, Perth. Two of them were launched on 6 October 2009 and they were delivered in February 2010.
Austal class		Inshore patrol vessel	P23	Australia	2010	Ordered in February 2009 and built by Austal, Perth. Two of them were launched on 6 October 2009 and they were delivered in February 2010.
Austal class		Inshore patrol vessel	P24	Australia	2010	Ordered in February 2009 and built by Austal, Perth. Two of them were launched on 6 October 2009 and they were delivered in February 2010.
Protector class		Offshore patrol vessel	P51	United States	2002	Built at Bollinger Shipyards
Protector class		Offshore patrol vessel	P52	United States	2004	Built at Bollinger Shipyards
Diciotti class (modified)		Offshore patrol vessel	P61	Italy	2005	Built by Fincantieri S.p.A. Italy at Muggiano Shipyard, and served as the flagship of the Maritime Squadron until the commissioning of P71. The vessel will be undergoing an overhaul and engine refit which will cost around €7 million as of 2015.
Emer class		Offshore patrol vessel	P62	Ireland	2015	Built in 1979 as LÉ Aoife by Verolme Cork Dockyard.
OPV748 class		Offshore patrol vessel	P71	Italy	2023	Built by Cantiere Navale Vittoria Italy at Adria, and replaced P61 as the flagship of the Maritime Squadron. Largest ship in the Maritime Squadron.

The European commission provided €110 million in funds for the AFM. The government used these funds to purchase the four P21 (Austal) class patrol vessels and has bought 2 new Beechcraft Super King Air offshore maritime surveillance aircraft for the Air Wing of the Armed Forces of Malta.

Investment of the P71

Malta’s flagship patrol vessel P71, which cost about €50 million (mostly EU-funded), has been out of service for nearly a year due to a mechanical fault involving key propulsion components. Although such issues are described as not uncommon, the long downtime has raised concerns given the vessel’s importance and high cost.

The P71 was already controversial before this, having been delivered late and over budget. Its current breakdown has intensified criticism about procurement, planning, and oversight by authorities.

Repairs are ongoing and expected to be completed soon, with costs covered under warranty. Meanwhile, the Armed Forces of Malta say other vessels are maintaining patrol operations, but concerns remain about the effectiveness and value of this major investment.

== Decommissioned vessels ==
A list of vessels since retired by the AFM.

Class	Photo	Ships	Origin	Commissioned	Decommissioned	Note
Patrol vessels (22 decommissioned)
		C21	Malta	1971 or 1973		Built at the Malta Drydocks for the Customs Department
Swift class		P23 (ex-C23); P24 (ex-C24)	United States	1971	2010	Built in 1967 as USA C6823 (PCF-813) and USA C6824 (PCF-816). Transferred from the United States Coast Guard in 1971. In 2012 P24 was handed back to the USA and it is now in the Maritime Museum of San Diego. P23 is laid up at Hay Wharf as of 2014.
		C25; C26	Yugoslavia	1975-1976	c.1990	Ex-Libyan Customs launches built in Yugoslavia with the names: unknown (C25); Tariq (C26)
Equity class		P25 (ex-C25); P26 (ex-C26)	United States	1991	c.2000	Ex-National Oceanic and Atmospheric Administration 1255 and 1257
		C27; C28; C29	Germany	1972	c.1980s	Built between 1952 and 1956 as Customs Launches with the following names: Brunsbuttel (C27); Geier (C28); Kondor (C29); C28 is now a ferry boat named Seahawk by Captain Morgan Cruises.
Farwa class		C28; C29	United Kingdom	1978	1992; 1989	Ex-Libyan Customs launches built in the UK in 1967–68 with the names: Arrakib (C28); Akrama (C29)
Kondor I class		P29; P30; P31	East Germany	1997; 1992; 1992	2004	Built at Peene Werft Shipyard 1968–1970 as minesweepers with the following names: Boltenhagen (P29); Ueckermuende (P30); Pasewalk (P31); P29 and P31 were sunk as diving sites in 2007 and 2009. As of 2013, ex-P30 was laid up at Marsa.
Bremse class		P32; P33	East Germany	1992	2012; 2005	Built at VEB Yachtwerft Berlin in 1971-1972; P33 was decommissioned in 2005 and was scuttled as an artificial reef in 2021. P32 was decommissioned in 2012, but it is still moored at Hay Wharf along with the other commissioned patrol boats as of 2015.
Litoraneo class		P34; P36; P37	Italy	1992		Built by Baglietto in the 1950s for the Italian Guardia di Finanza with the following names: GL 314 (P34); GL 326 (P36); GL 316 (P37)
Kalnik class		P38 (ex-C38); P39 (ex-C38)	Yugoslavia	1982		Donated by Yugoslavia
Search and rescue launches (4 decommissioned)
RAF 1600 series		C20	United Kingdom	1980s		Ex-RAF Search and Rescue Force 1654. As of 2011, the decommissioned boat lay derelict in a field at Marsaxlokk.
RAF 1300 series		C21	United Kingdom	1980s		Ex-RAF Search and Rescue Force
RAF 2700 series		C68; C71	United Kingdom	1978		Ex-RAF Search and Rescue Force 2768 and 2771
Landing craft (1 decommissioned)
Higgins boat		LC1	United States			
