= Hay Wharf =

Naval base in Marsamxett Harbour, Floriana, Malta

- Xatt it-Tiben
- Floriana, Malta
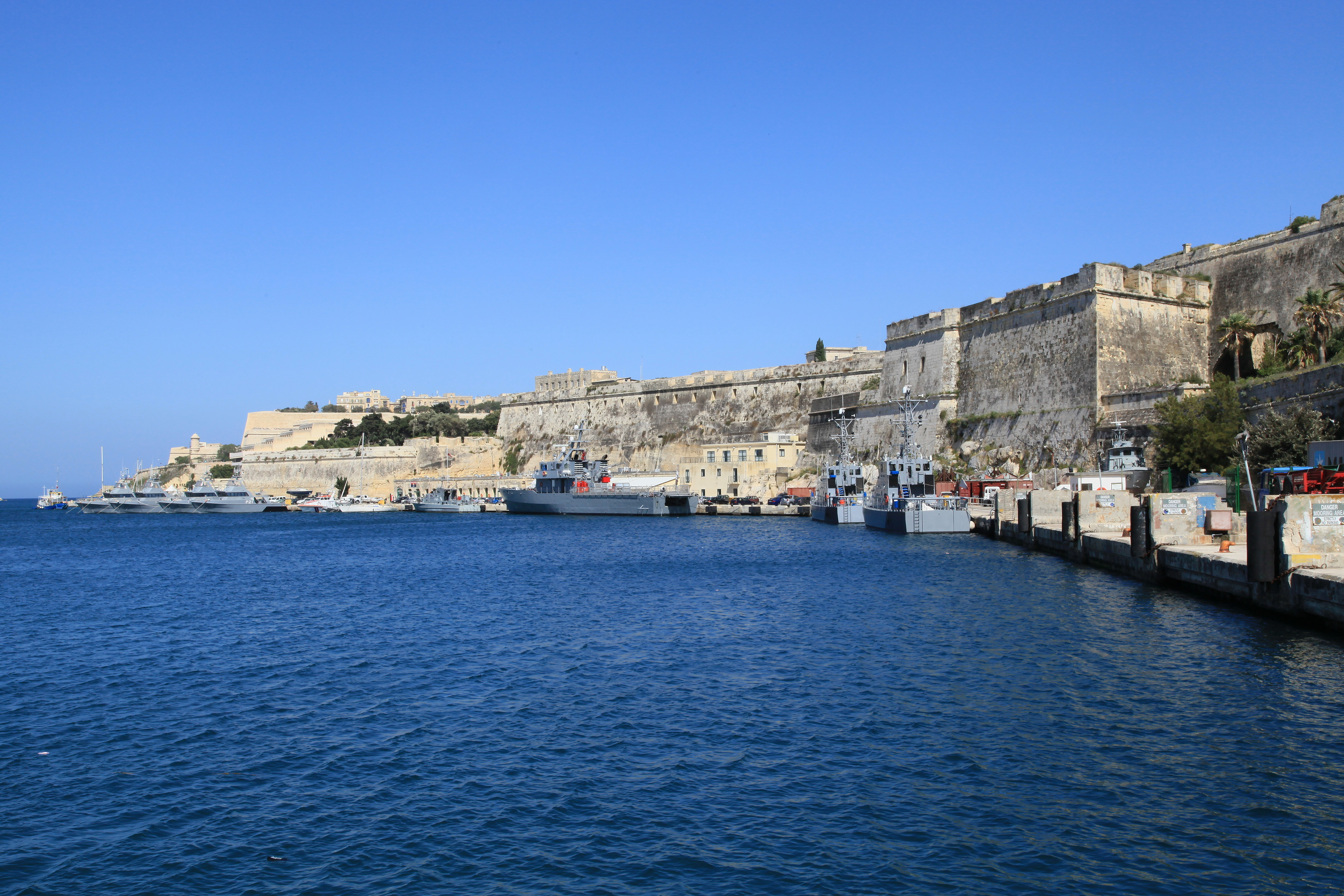
- Hay Wharf as seen from Sa Maison

Site information
- Type: Naval base
- Owner: Government of Malta
- Operator: Maritime Squadron of the Armed Forces of Malta
- Condition: Active

Location
- Coordinates: 35°53′44.2″N 14°30′6.3″E

Site history
- Built: 2015–2016
- In use: 1977–present
- Materials: Limestone and concrete

Hay Wharf or Haywharf (Maltese: Xatt it-Tiben) is a naval base in Marsamxett Harbour, in Floriana, Malta. The wharf has been the main base of the Maritime Squadron of the Armed Forces of Malta since 1977, and a new facility was built between 2015 and 2016.

== History ==
Hay Wharf is situated along the Marsamxett side of the Floriana Lines. The wharf is located between Msida Bastion and La Vittoria Bastion, and is overlooked by the Polverista Curtain, a long casemated curtain wall completed in 1722.

The wharf was probably named "Hay Wharf" since it was used to store forage in the 19th century. It has also been proposed that the wharf was named after Lord John Hay, who was the Commander in Chief of the Mediterranean Fleet based in Malta between 1883 and 1887. The Club House of the Royal Malta Yacht Club was located at Hay Wharf until 1970.

The 1st (Maritime) Battery of the Armed Forces of Malta moved from Senglea to Hay Wharf in October 1977. The battery became the Maritime Squadron of the Armed Forces of Malta in 1980, retaining the same base. Hay Wharf is also Malta's main search and rescue base, and all rescued illegal immigrants land there.

The Swift-class patrol boat P23 has been laid up at Hay Wharf since its decommissioning in 2010. The patrol boat is to be preserved as a memorial for the seven soldiers and policemen who died when it exploded in 1984.

In November 2014, it was announced that the base will be upgraded in a €5.5 million project. The upgrade includes the building of a border control room, a rapid deployment launching facility, training facilities, and better staff accommodation. Construction of the new base began in mid-2015, and the new structures are controversial since some feel that they hide the bastions behind them. The new base was inaugurated in January 2016.
