= Protector-class coastal patrol boat =

2002 Maltese naval ship class

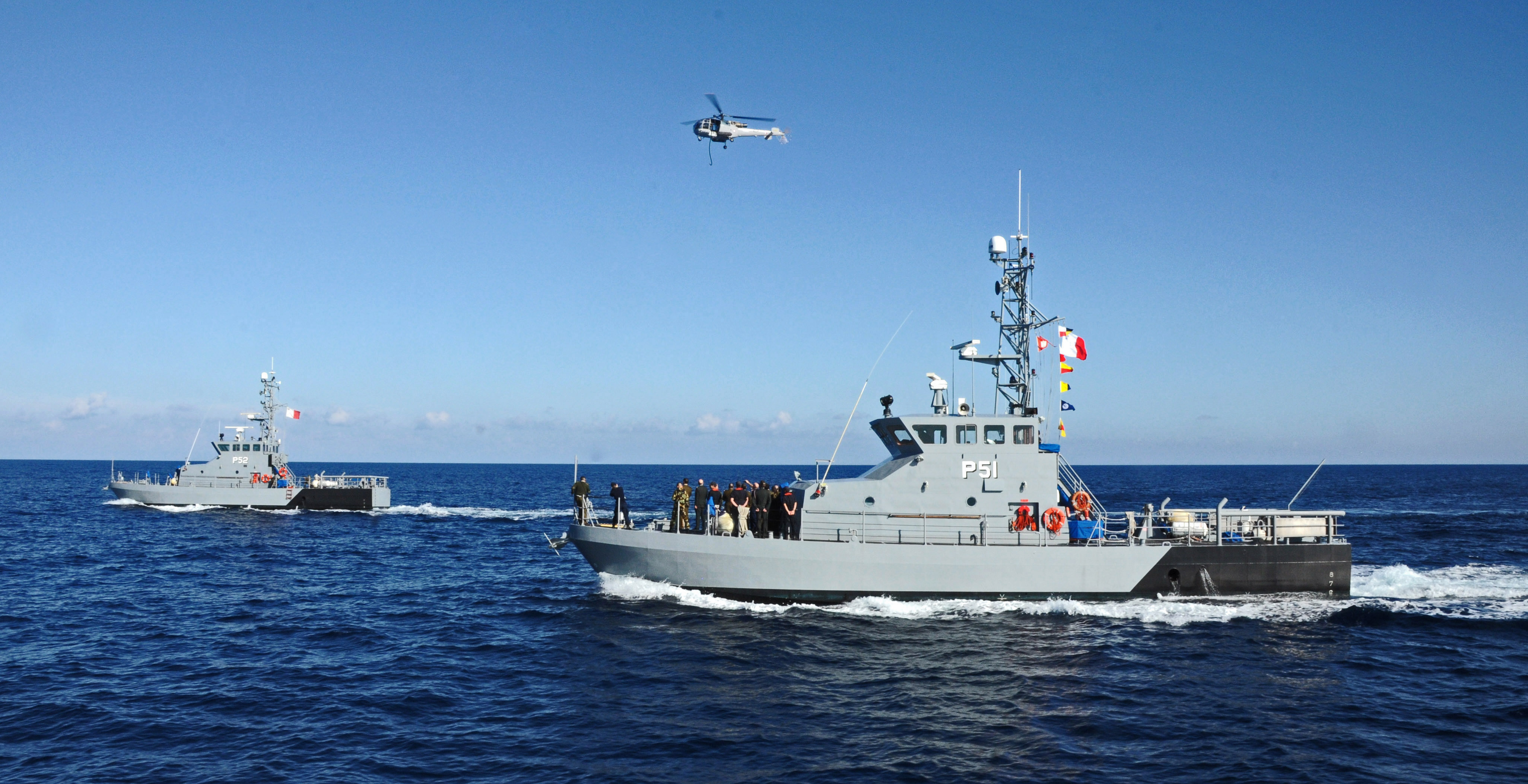
- Malta's patrol boats on an anti-piracy training mission in 2011

Class overview
- Name: Protector class
- Builders: Bollinger Shipyards, Lockport, Louisiana
- Operators: Maritime Squadron of the Armed Forces of Malta
- Preceded by: Kondor I class
- Built: 2002–2004
- In service: 2002–present
- Completed: 2
- Active: 2

General characteristics
- Type: Patrol boat
- Displacement: 92 long tons (93 t)
- Length: 26.5 m (87 ft)
- Beam: 5.8 m (19 ft)
- Draft: 1.6 m (5.2 ft)
- Propulsion: 2 × MTU diesels
- Speed: over 25 knots (46 km/h; 29 mph)
- Range: 900 nmi (1,700 km)
- Endurance: 5 days
- Complement: 10
- Sensors & processing systems: 1 × Navigation I-Band radar
- Armament: 2 × 12.7 mm machine guns

The Protector-class coastal patrol boats are a class of coastal patrol boats of the Maritime Squadron of the Armed Forces of Malta. They are 87-foot (27 m) patrol boats based on the Stan 2600 patrol vessel design from the Netherlands shipbuilding firm Damen Group. The Hong Kong Police were the first organization to order vessels based on this design. The United States Coast Guard (USCG) has 73 patrol boats from this class, where they are known as the Marine Protector class. Malta ordered two vessels, and they were built by Bollinger Shipyards to the USCG specifications under the US$13 Million grant from the United States provided by the United States Securities Act of 2000. They were given pennant numbers P51 and P52. In 2013, both patrol boats were upgraded with new equipment including infrared cameras and a rigid hull inflatable boat. The upgrade cost €1.7 million and was co-funded by the European Union’s External Fund.

== P51 ==
P51 was commissioned on 18 November 2002, and it was the AFM's first vessel to be ordered brand new, as all previous ones were bought or donated after being retired from foreign naval service. P51 took part in the search and rescue operations after the Simshar tragedy in July 2008, and it recovered the dead body of Carmelo Bugeja and took the sole survivor Simon Bugeja from the fishing boat Grecale to Xatt it-Tiben in Floriana. Since its commissioning, the patrol boat has rescued the lives of over 2,000 illegal immigrants and covered over 50,000 nautical miles. Some examples include:

- 25 August 2009: P51 intercepted a boat with 60 distressed Eritrean immigrants
- 15 September 2009: P51 intercepted a dinghy with 68 immigrants
- 20 August 2012: P51 and a King Air aircraft intercepted a boat with 56 men and 24 women

On 12 November 2012, the tenth anniversary of her commissioning, the Times of Malta published an article to reflect on the P51's first ten years. The article stated that:

"...P51 has since covered 52,230 nautical miles and rescued 2,169 persons. It conducted 63 boarding operations at sea and 15 fisheries enforcement operations."

- 30 December 2018: P51 rescued 69 migrants from a wooden boat in distress, 117NM south west of Malta.
- 28 March 2019: P51 took part in an operation to retake merchant ship Elhibru 1 which was overpowered by migrants refusing to go back to Libya. The operation was a success and the merchant vessel was safely escorted to Boiler Wharf, Senglea. Aboard the ship there were 108 rescued migrants which included 19 women and 12 children. 5 of the migrants were arraigned with an act of 'Piracy'.
- 13 April 2019: P51 received 64 migrants from the Alan Kurdi NGO rescue vessel that was stranded off Maltese waters for 10 days. The P51 then disembarked the migrants at Hay Wharf base. They were permitted safe land only after the Maltese government made sure that none of them are to stay in the country but instead they are gonna be redistributed between Germany, France, Portugal and Luxembourg.
- 11 May 2019: P51 disembarked 85 migrants at Hay Wharf after they were rescued the day before from a sinking wooden boat. This rescue came after at least 50 migrants died off the coast of Tunisia a few hours prior.

== P52 ==
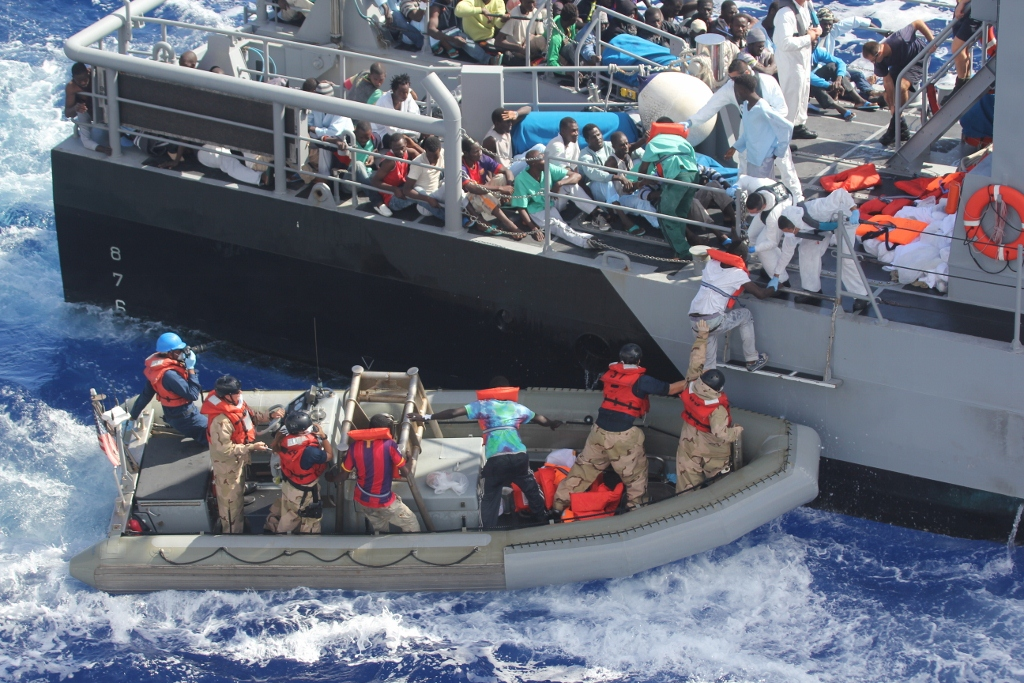
Distressed illegal immigrants are transferred to P52 in 2013.

P52 was commissioned two years later on 7 July 2004. It also took part in the search and rescue efforts after the 2008 Simshar tragedy and recovered the decomposing body of the Somali fisherman who was on the sunken boat. Like P51 it also rescued hundreds of illegal immigrants over the years, such as:

- 2 June 2012: P52 and a King Air aircraft intercepted a dinghy with 113 immigrants about 50 miles south of Dingli
- 20 July 2014: 81 migrants were transferred to P52 from the freighter which rescued them from their boat in distress
- 28 August 2014: 257 migrants were transferred to P52 and another patrol boat from a cargo ship which rescued them from their sinking boat
- 9 January 2019: 49 migrants were transferred to P52 and sister ship P51 from NGO vessels Sea-Watch 3 and Sea-Eye after they spent 19 days going back and forth into Maltese territorial waters.
- 25 May 2019: 216 migrants were rescued by P52 and the P21 after distress calls where received from 2 rubber dinghies during the night. Both dinghies were inside Maltese territorial water.
- 5 June 2019: On this day the Armed forces of Malta rescued a total of 370 migrants in 4 separate occasions. The final group of 99 migrants to be rescued were brought to Malta aboard the P52. This day was by far one of the busiest in recent history for the navy. Prior to this rescue P21 and P61 were also involved in the other rescue operations.
- 23 June 2019: 37 migrants were rescued by the P52, from a boat that has been on the water for more than a day and fell under the Maltese SAR zone. An NGO claimed that some of the migrants were very close to death. All 37 males were brought safely to port.

== See ==
List of United States Coast Guard cutters § 87' Marine Protector-class coastal patrol boat (WPB)
