= Jeddah =

Second-largest city in Saudi Arabia

Jeddah جدة
- City and metropolis
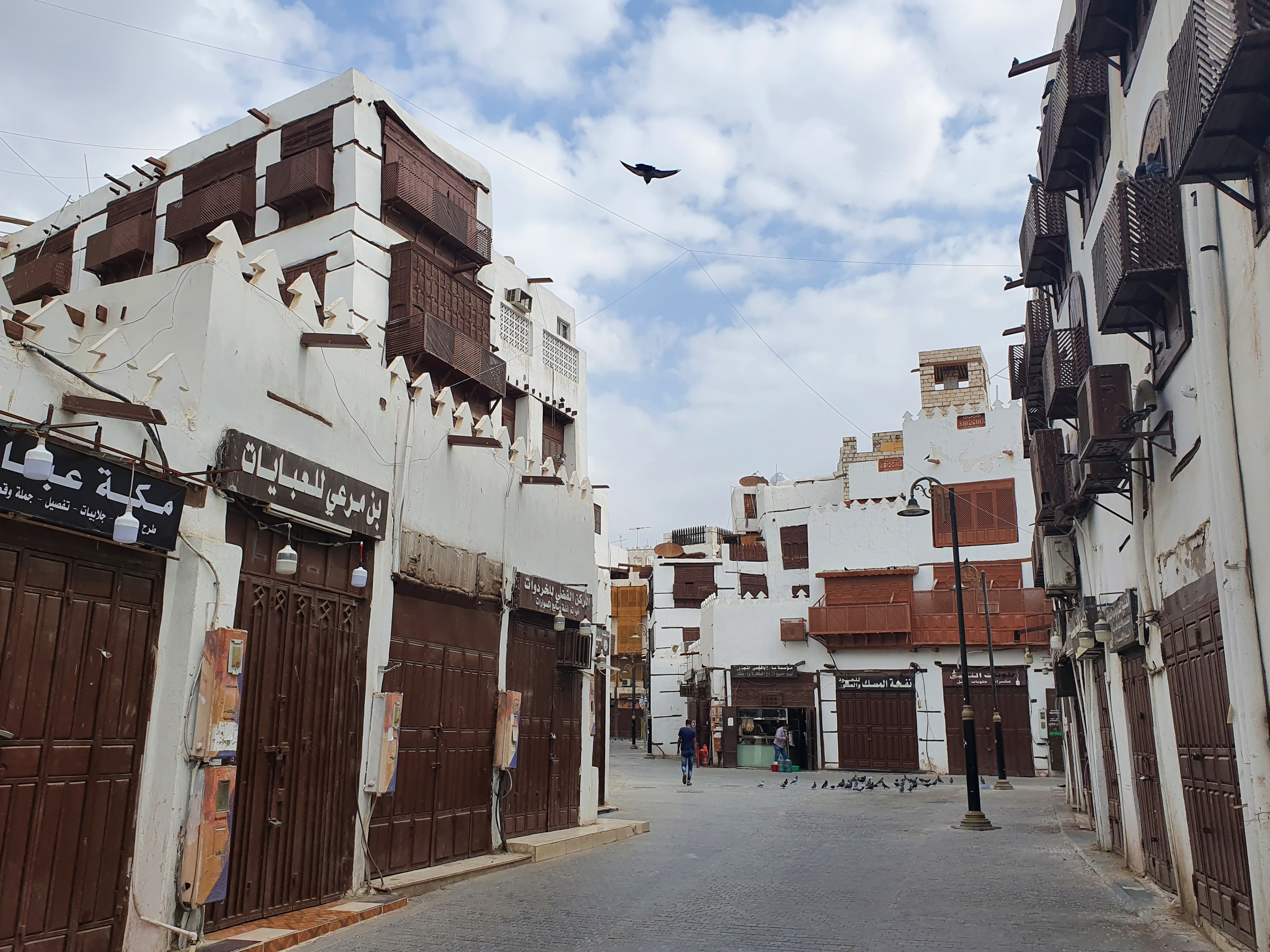
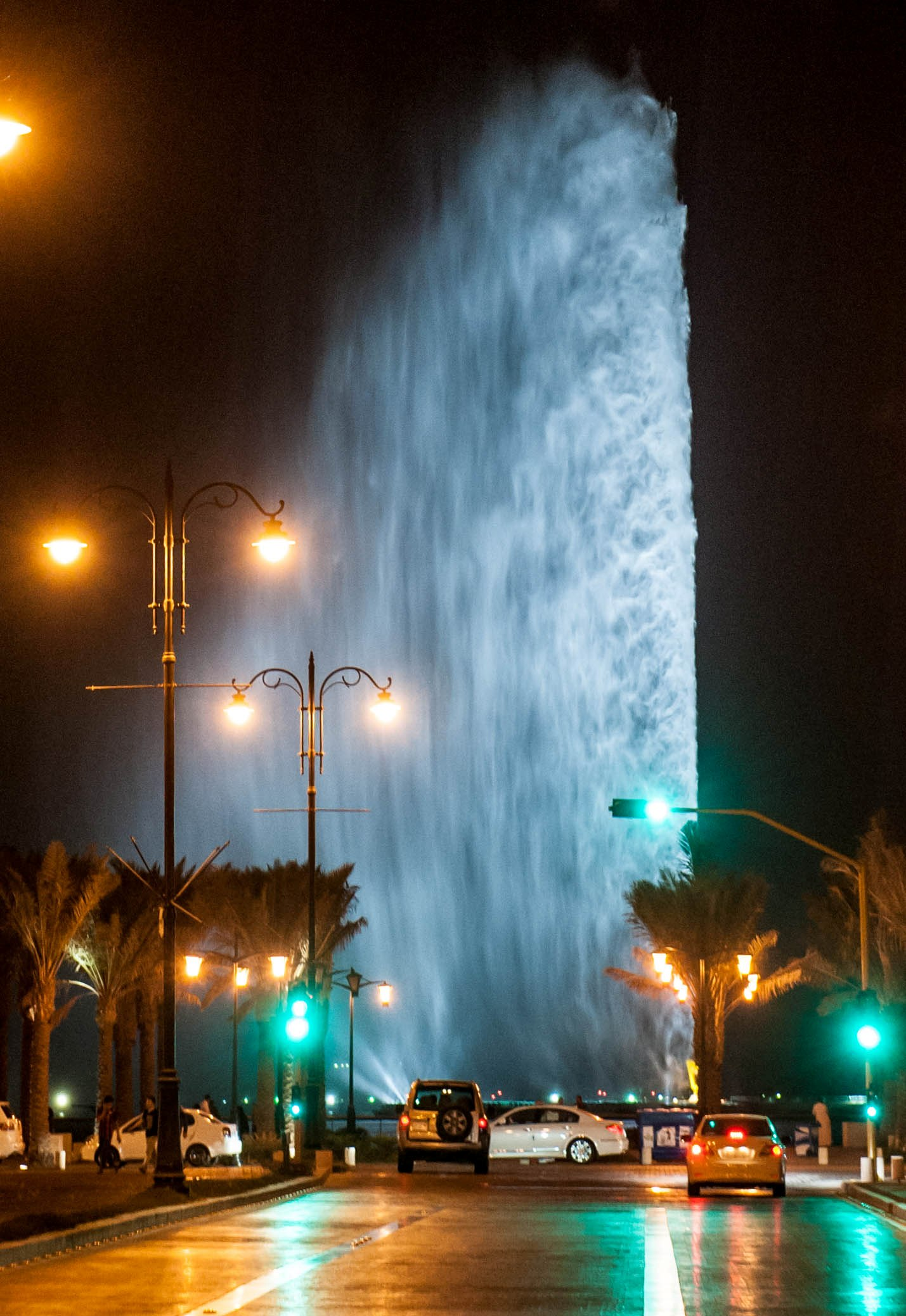
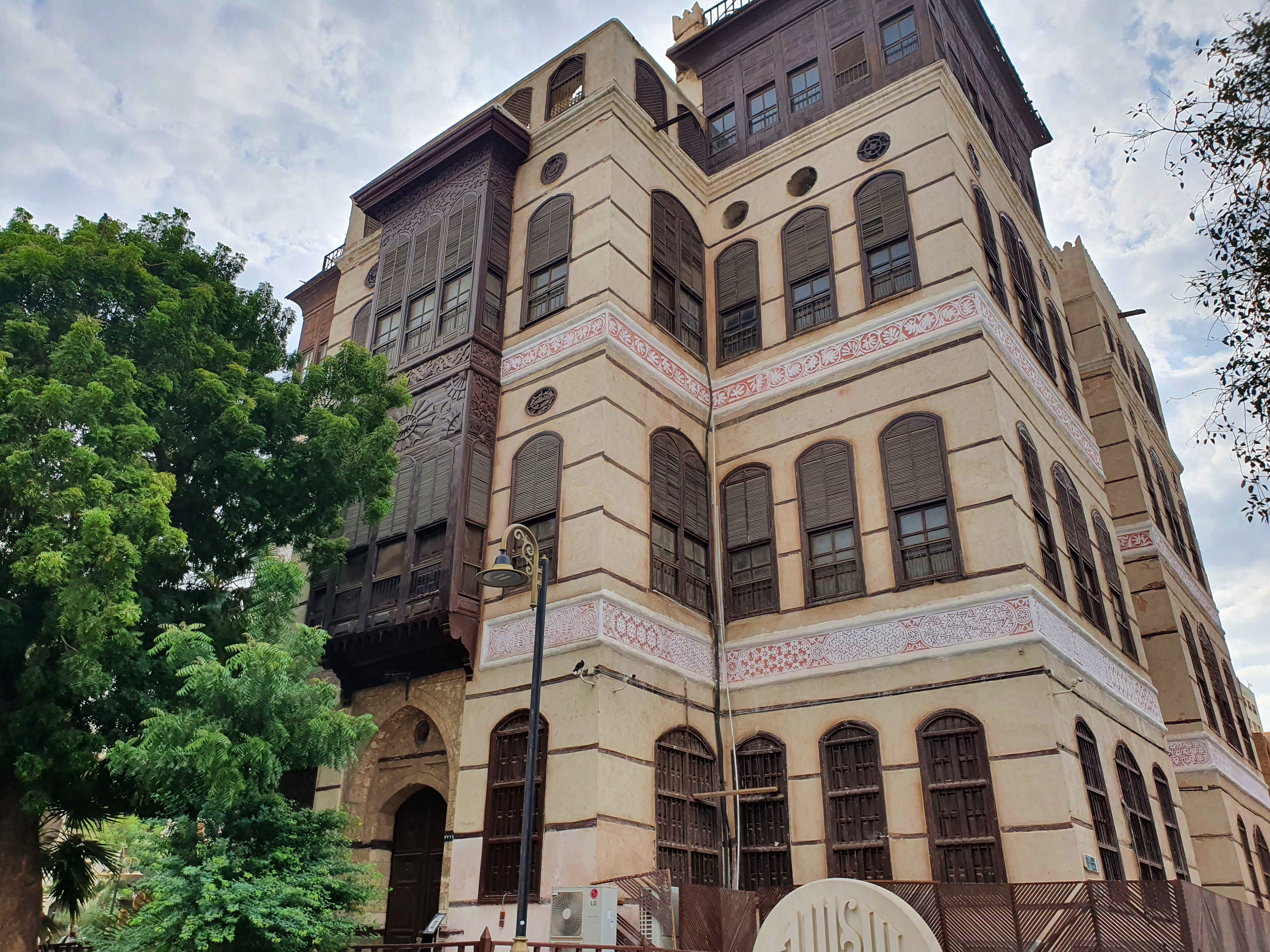
- Jeddah Waterfront Al-Balad historic district Globe Roundabout King Fahd's Fountain Nasseef House

- Seal
- Nickname: The Bride of the Red Sea
- Motto: Jeddah Is Different
- Location of Jeddah within Mecca Province

- Location of Jeddah within Saudi Arabia
- Coordinates: 21°32′36″N 39°10′22″E
- Country: Saudi Arabia
- Province: Mecca Province
- Governorate: Jeddah Governorate

Government
  - Type: Municipality
  - Body: Jeddah Municipality
  - Mayor: Ehsan Bafaqeeh

Area
  - City and metropolis: 1,600 km^{2} (620 sq mi)
  - Urban: 1,793 km^{2} (692 sq mi)
  - Metro: 2,485 km^{2} (959 sq mi)
- Elevation: 12 m (39 ft)

Population (2022)
  - City and metropolis: 3,751,722
  - Density: 2,300/km^{2} (6,100/sq mi)

GDP (PPP, constant 2015 values)
  - Year: 2023
  - Total (Metro): $235.6 billion
  - Per capita: $48,500
- Time zone: UTC+03:00 (SAST)
- Postal Code: 5 digit codes beginning with 21 (e.g. 21577)
- Area code: +966 12
- HDI (2021): 0.871 – very high
- Website: jeddah.gov.sa

UNESCO World Heritage Site
- Official name: Historic Jeddah, the Gate to Mecca
- Criteria: Cultural: ii, iv, vi
- Reference: 1361
- Inscription: 2014 (38th Session)
- Area: 17.92 ha (44.3 acres)
- Buffer zone: 113.58 ha (280.7 acres)

Jeddah (Note: English: /ˈdʒɛdə/ JED-ə, /ˈdʒɪdə/ JID-ə; Arabic: جِدَّة, romanized: Jidda, Hejazi Arabic pronunciation: [ˈ(d)ʒɪd.da]) is the largest city in Mecca Province, the second-largest city in Saudi Arabia after Riyadh, and the country's main commercial center. It is in the Hejaz region on the Red Sea coast. The city's metropolitan area is coterminous with Jeddah Governorate. Its prominence grew in 647 CE when the Caliph Uthman of the Rashidun Caliphate designated it as the main port serving travelers to Mecca.

Jeddah is the largest city in Hejaz and the ninth-largest in the Middle East. It also serves as the administrative center of the OIC. Jeddah Islamic Port, on the Red Sea, is the thirty-sixth largest seaport in the world and the second-largest and second-busiest seaport in the Middle East.

Jeddah is the principal gateway to Mecca, the holiest city in Islam, 65 kilometers (40 mi) to the east, while Medina, the second-holiest city, is 360 kilometers (220 mi) to the north. Economically, Jeddah is focusing on further developing capital investment in scientific and engineering leadership within Saudi Arabia, and the Middle East. Jeddah was ranked fourth in the Africa, Middle East, and -stan countries region in the Innovation Cities Index in 2009.

== Etymology and spelling ==
There are at least two etymologies of Jeddah, according to Jeddah Ibn Al-Qudaa'iy, the chief of the Quda'a clan. The more common account has it that the name is derived from جدة Jaddah, the Arabic word for "grandmother". According to folk belief, the Tomb of Eve, who is considered the grandmother of humanity, is located in Jeddah.

The Maghrebi traveler Ibn Battuta visited Jeddah during his world trip around 1330. He wrote the name of the city into his diary as "Jiddah".

The British Foreign, Commonwealth and Development Office and other branches of the British government formerly used the older spelling of "Jedda", contrary to other English-speaking usages, but in 2007, it changed to the spelling "Jeddah".

T. E. Lawrence felt that any transcription of Arabic names into English was arbitrary. In his book Revolt in the Desert, Jeddah is spelled in three different ways on the first page alone.

On official Saudi maps and documents, the city name is transcribed "Jeddah", which is now the prevailing usage.

== History ==
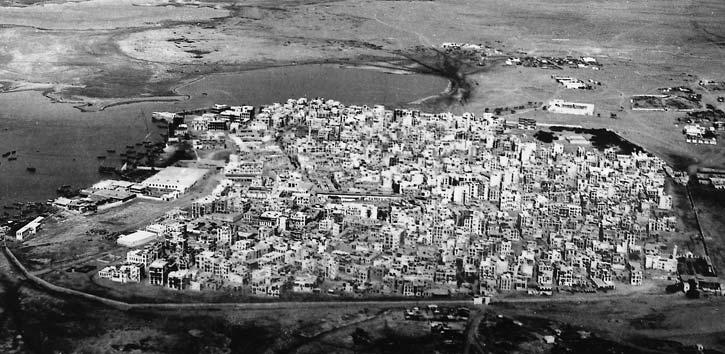
Jeddah in 1938

=== Pre-Islam ===
Traces of early activity in the area are attested by Thamudic inscriptions excavated in Wadi Briman (وادي بريمان), east of the city, and Wadi Boweb (وادي بويب), northwest of the city. The oldest mashrabiya found in Jeddah dates back to the pre-Islamic era.

Some believe that Jeddah was inhabited before Alexander the Great, who led a naval expedition to the Red Sea, by fishermen who considered it a center from which they sailed, as well as a place for rest and well-being. According to the Ministry of Hajj, Jeddah has been settled for more than 2,500 years.

Excavations in the old city have been interpreted to give the fact that Jeddah was founded as a fishing hamlet by the Yemeni Quda'a tribe (Arabic: بني قضاعة), who left to settle in Makkah (Mecca) after the collapse of Marib Dam in Yemen in 115 BC.

=== Under the Caliphates ===
Jeddah first achieved prominence around A.D. 647, when the third Muslim Caliph, Uthman Ibn Affan, turned it into a port making it the port of Makkah instead of Al Shoaib port, which was southwest of Makkah.

The Umayyads inherited the entire Rashidun Caliphate including Hejaz and ruled from 661 to 750. In 702, Jeddah was briefly occupied by pirates from the Kingdom of Axum. However, Jeddah remained a key civilian harbor, serving fishermen and pilgrims travelling by sea for the Hajj. It is also believed that the Sharifdom of Makkah, an honorary Viceroy to the holy land, was first started in this period of the Islamic Caliphate. Jeddah has been established as the main city of the historic Hijaz province and a historic port for pilgrims arriving by sea to perform their Hajj pilgrimage in Mecca.

In 750 in the Abbasid Revolution, the Abbasids successfully took control of almost the whole Umayyad Empire, excluding Morocco (Maghrib) and Spain (Al-Andalus). From 876, Jeddah and the surrounding area became the object of wars between the Abbasids and the Tulunids of Egypt, who at one point gained control of the emirates of Egypt, Syria, Jordan and Hejaz. The power struggle between the Tulunid Governors and the Abbasids over Hejaz lasted for nearly twenty-five years, until the Tulunids finally withdrew from Arabia in 900.

In 930 AD, the main Hejazi cities of Medina, Mecca and Taif were heavily sacked by the Qarmatians. It is probable, though not historically confirmed, that Jeddah itself was attacked.

Soon after, in early 935, the Ikhshidids, the new power in Egypt, took control of the Hejaz region. There are no historical records that detail the Ikhshidid rule of Hejaz. At this point in time, Jeddah was still unfortified and without walls.

=== The Fatimids, Ayyubids, and Mamluks ===
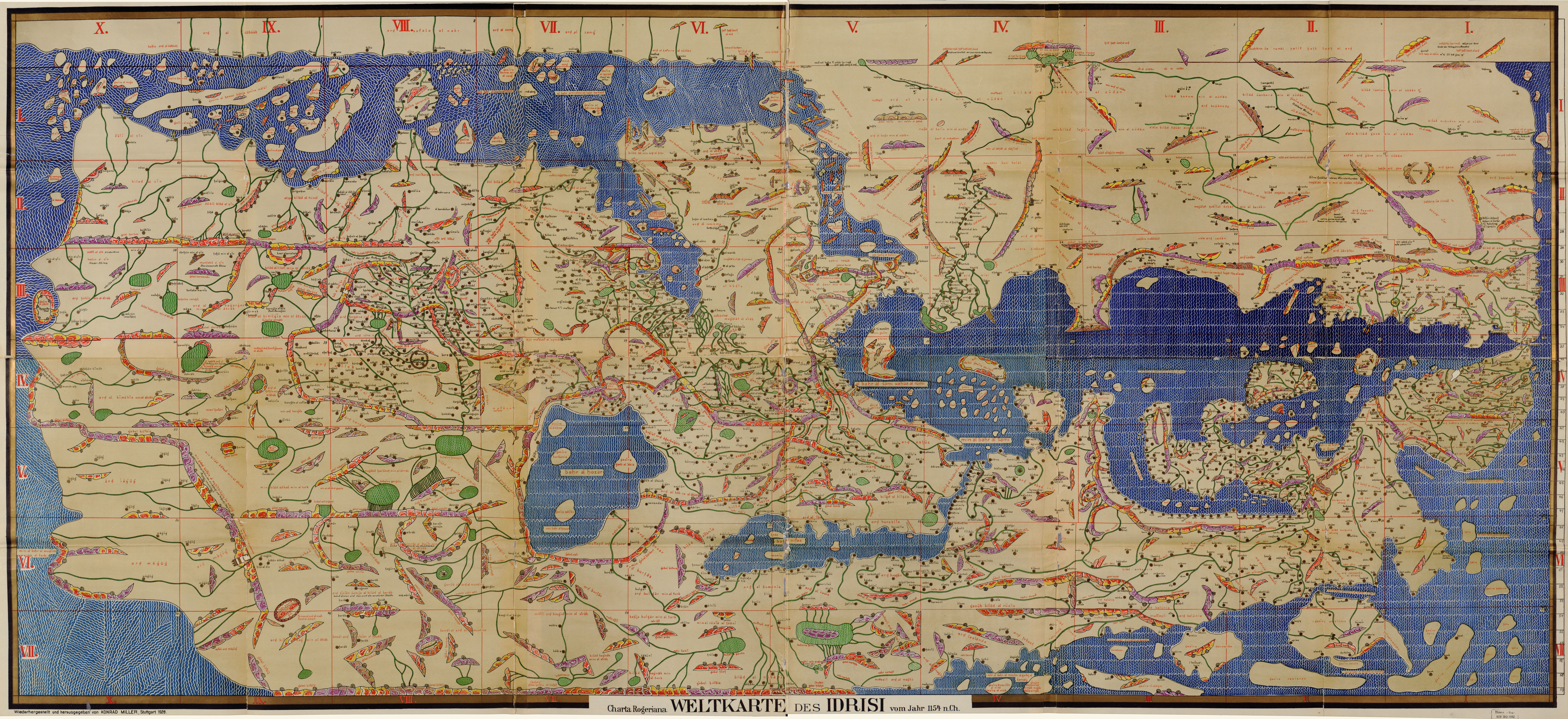
Tabula Rogeriana, a reproduction of one of the most advanced early world maps, by Muhammad al-Idrisi produced in 1154 shows the location of Jeddah. This is a south-up map orientation.

In 969 AD, the Fatimids from Algeria took control in Egypt from the Ikhshidid Governors of Abbasids and expanded their empire to the surrounding regions, including The Hijaz and Jeddah. The Fatimids developed an extensive trade network in both the Mediterranean and the Indian Ocean through the Red Sea. Their trade and diplomatic ties extended all the way to China and its Song dynasty, which eventually determined the economic course of Tihamah during the High Middle Ages.

After Saladin's conquest of Jerusalem in 1171, he proclaimed himself sultan of Egypt, after dissolving the Fatimid Caliphate upon the death of al-Adid, thus establishing the Ayyubid dynasty. Ayyubid conquests in Hejaz included Jeddah, which joined the Ayyubid dynasty in 1177 during the leadership of Sharif Ibn Abul-Hashim Al-Thalab (1094–1201). During their relatively short-lived tenure, the Ayyubids ushered in an era of economic prosperity in the lands they ruled and the facilities and patronage provided by the Ayyubids led to a resurgence in intellectual activity in the Islamic world. This period was also marked by an Ayyubid process of vigorously strengthening Sunni dominance in the region by constructing numerous madrasas (Islamic schools) in their major cities. Jeddah attracted Muslim sailors and merchants from Sindh, Southeast Asia and East Africa, and other distant regions.

In the year 1258, after the fall of Baghdad, the capital of the Abbasid Empire, to the Mongols, Hejaz became a part of the Mamluk Sultanate.

The Portuguese explorer Vasco da Gama, having found his way around the Cape and obtaining pilots from the coast of Zanzibar in AD 1497, pushed his way across the Indian Ocean to the shores of Malabar and Calicut, attacked fleets that carried freight and Muslim pilgrims from India to the Red Sea, and struck terror into the surrounding potentates. The Princes of Gujarat and Yemen turned for help to Egypt. Sultan Al-Ashraf Qansuh al-Ghawri accordingly fitted out a fleet of 50 vessels under the Governor of Jeddah, Hussein the Kurd (aka. Mirocem). Jeddah was soon fortified with a wall, using forced labor, as a harbor of refuge from the Portuguese, allowing Arabia and the Red Sea to be protected.

=== Ottoman Empire ===
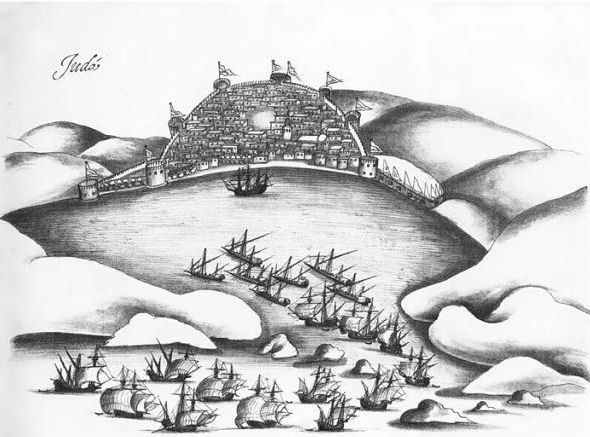
Portuguese attack in 1517 by Gaspar Correia (c. 1496–1563) - originally from Lendas da India by Gaspar Correia.

In 1517, the Ottoman Turks conquered the Mamluk Sultanate in Egypt and Syria during the reign of Selim I.

The Ottomans rebuilt the weak walls of Jeddah in 1525 following the defense of the city against the Lopo Soares de Albergaria's Armada at the Siege of Jeddah (1517). The new stone wall included six watchtowers and six city gates. They were constructed to defend against the Portuguese attack. Of the six gates, the Gate of Mecca was the eastern gate and the Gate of Al-Magharibah, facing the port, was the western gate. The Gate of Sharif faces south. The other gates were the Gate of Al-Bunt, Gate of Al-Sham (also called Gate of Al-Sharaf), and Gate of Medina, facing north. The Turks also built The Qishla of Jeddah, a small castle for the city's soldiers. In the 19th century, these seven gates were minimized into four giant gates with four towers. These giant gates were the Gate of Sham to the north, the Gate of Mecca to the east, the Gate of Sharif to the south, and the Gate of Al-Magharibah on the seaside.

Jeddah became a direct Ottoman Eyalet, while the remaining Hejaz under Sharif Barakat II became a vassal state to the Ottoman Empire eight years after the Siege of Jeddah in 1517. The Portuguese attempted to attack the port again in 1541, but were repelled.

Parts of the city wall still survive today in the old city. Even though the Portuguese were successfully repelled from the city, fleets in the Indian Ocean were at their mercy. This was evidenced by the Battle of Diu. The Portuguese soldiers' cemetery can still be found within the old city today and is referred to as the site of the Christian Graves.

Ahmed Al-Jazzar, the Ottoman military man mainly known for his role in the Siege of Acre, spent the earlier part of his career at Jeddah. In Jeddah in 1750, he killed some seventy rioting nomads in retaliation for the killing of his commander, Abdullah Beg, earning him the nickname "Jezzar" (butcher).

On 15 June 1858, rioting in the city, believed to have been instigated by a former police chief in reaction to British policy in the Red Sea, led to the massacre of 25 Christians, including the British and French consuls, members of their families, and wealthy Greek merchants. The British frigate HMS Cyclops, anchored at the port, bombarded the city for two days in retaliation.

=== First Saudi State and Ottoman–Saudi War ===
In 1802, Nejdi forces conquered both Mecca and Jeddah from the Ottomans. When Sharif Ghalib Efendi informed Sultan Mahmud II of this, the Sultan ordered his Egyptian viceroy Muhammad Ali Pasha to retake the city. Muhammad Ali successfully regained the city in the Battle of Jeddah in 1813.

=== World War I and the Hashemite Kingdom ===
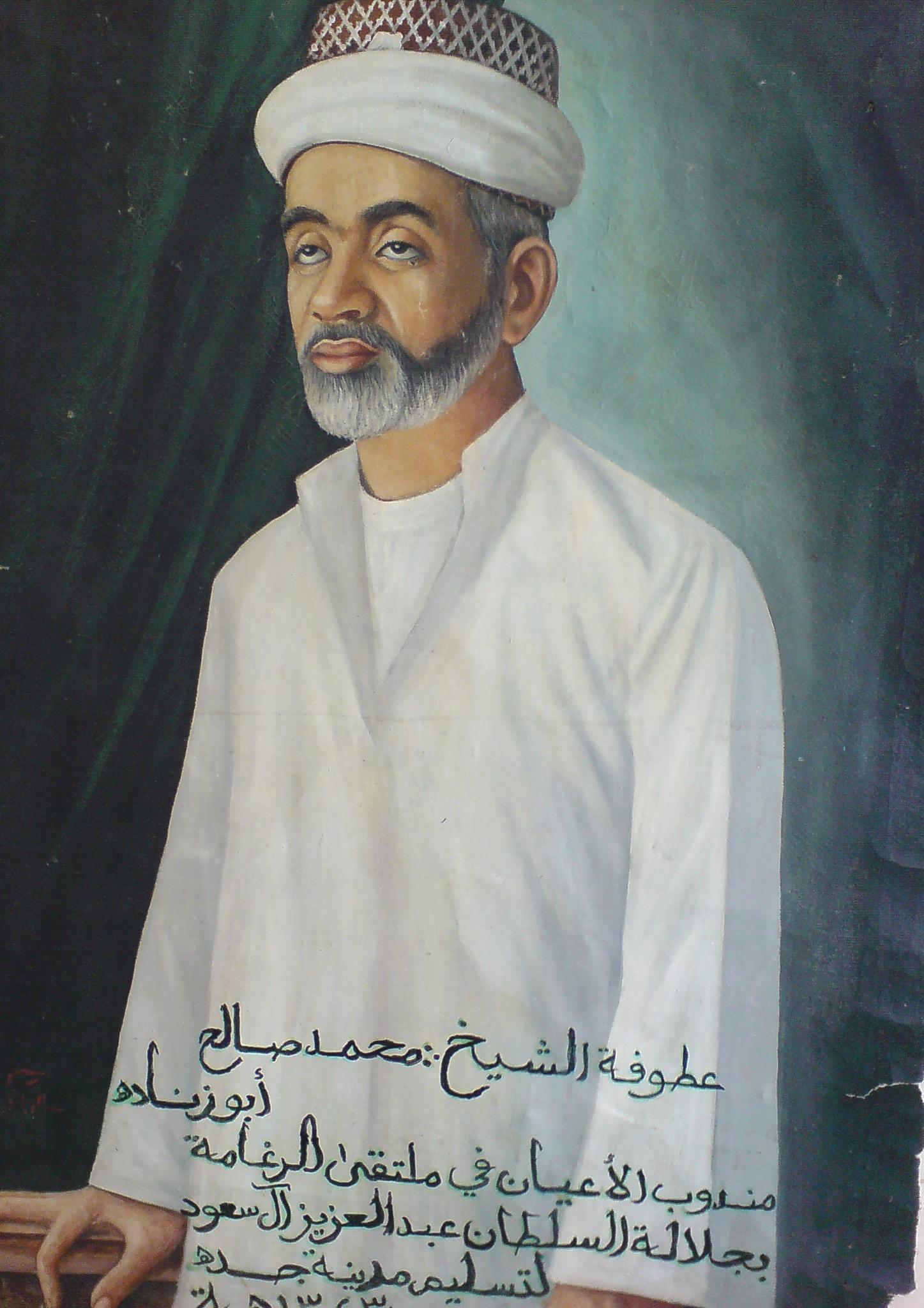
Mohammed Abu Zenada, one of the Chiefs of Jeddah and the advisor to the Sharif during the surrender to King Abdulaziz Ibn Saud in 1925.

During World War I, Sharif Hussein bin Ali declared a revolt against the Ottoman Empire, seeking independence from the Ottoman Turks and the creation of a single unified Arab state spanning from Aleppo in Syria to Aden in Yemen.

King Hussein declared the Kingdom of Hejaz. Later, Hussein was involved in a war with Ibn Saud, who was the Sultan of Nejd. Hussein abdicated following the fall of Mecca, in December 1924, and his son Ali bin Hussein became the new king.

=== Kingdom of Saudi Arabia ===
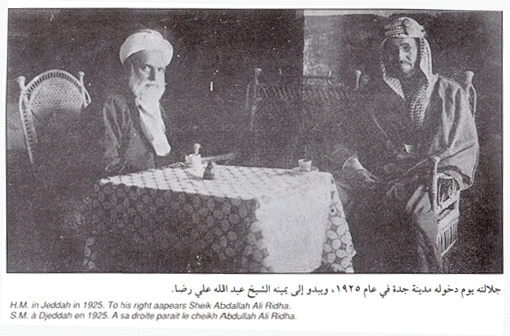
King Abdulaziz sitting with Abdullah Ali Reda on the day he entered Jeddah in 1925

A few months later, Ibn Saud, whose clan originated in the central Nejd province, conquered Medina and Jeddah via an agreement with Jeddans following the Second Battle of Jeddah. He deposed Ali bin Hussein, who fled to Baghdad, eventually settling in Amman, Jordan, where his descendants became part of its Hashemite royalty.

As a result, Jeddah came under the sway of the Al-Saud dynasty in December 1925. In 1926, Ibn Saud added the title King of Hejaz to his position of Sultan of Nejd. Today, Jeddah has lost its historical role in peninsular politics after it fell within the new province of Makkah, whose provincial capital is the city of Mecca.

From 1928 to 1932, the new Khuzam Palace was built as the new residence of King Abdul Aziz in Jeddah. The palace lies south of the old walled city and was constructed under the supervision of the engineer Mohammed bin Awad bin Laden. After 1963, the palace was used as a royal guesthouse; since 1995, it has housed the Regional Museum of Archaeology and Ethnography.

Jeddah as seen by a KH-4A CORONA reconnaissance satellite on 5 March 1965, showing the city’s growth beyond its historic walls and the coastline before later land reclamation.

The remaining walls and gates of the old city were demolished in 1947. In 1939, a military airstrip was built in Jeddah, serving as the first airport in Jeddah. It was upgraded into the headquarters of the RSAF by the 1950s. On 14 October 1952, Jeddah Airport was officially inaugurated and opened under the patronage of His Royal Highness Prince Saud Bin Abdulaziz. A fire in 1982 destroyed some ancient buildings in the old town center, called Al-Balad, but much is still preserved. A house-by-house survey of the old districts was made in 1979, showing that some 1000 traditional buildings still existed, though the number of structures with great historic value was far less. In 1990, a Jeddah Historical Area Preservation Department was founded.

The modern city has expanded wildly beyond its old boundaries. The built-up area expanded mainly to the north along the Red Sea coastline, reaching the new airport during the 1990s and since edging its way around it toward the Obhur Creek, some 27 km (17 mi) from the old city center.

In October 2021, Saudi authorities, led by Mohammad bin Salman, initiated a large-scale demolition and eviction plan in neighborhoods in the southern part of Jeddah to make way for the Jeddah Central Project, a revitalization project under Saudi Vision 2030. The demolitions affected 558,000 people in more than 60 neighborhoods. Amnesty International confirmed through official documents that some of the residents were notified about evictions only 24 hours before, while others were between 1–6 weeks. In some cases "evacuate" was written on the buildings, while the state media and billboards informed others about the demolitions to others. Saudi state media claimed the majority of affected neighborhoods were "rife with diseases, crime, drugs and theft" and home to predominantly undocumented immigrants. In January 2022, Saudi authorities announced a compensation scheme that accounted for 47% of those evicted.

== Geography ==
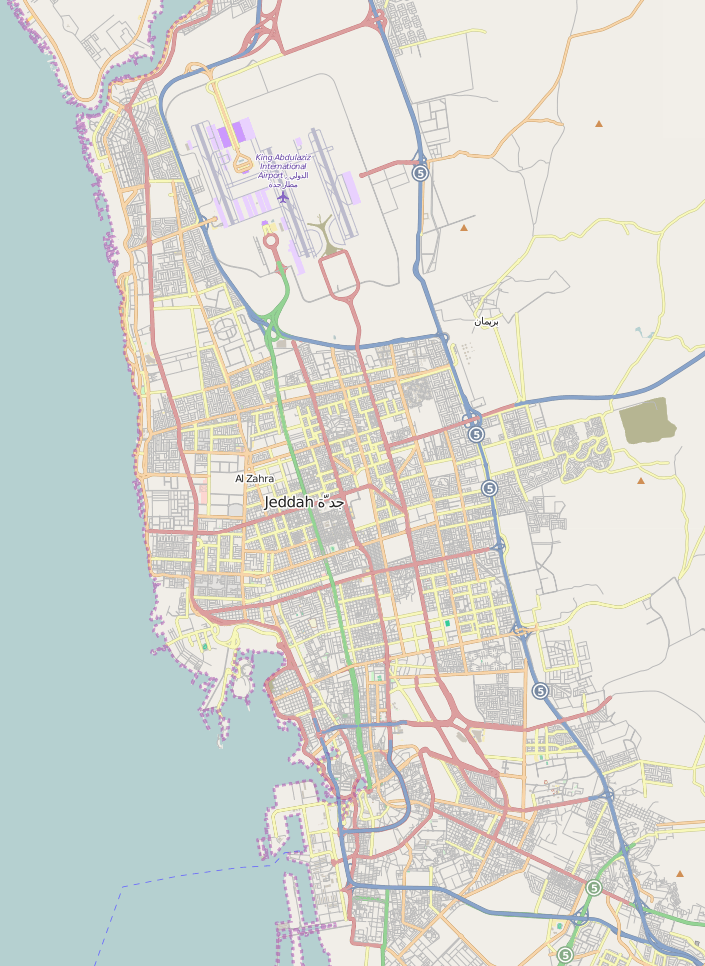
Map of Jeddah from OpenStreetMap

Jeddah is located in Saudi Arabia's Red Sea coastal plain (called Tihamah). Jeddah lies in the Hijazi Tihama (تهامة الحجاز) region which is in the lower Hijaz mountains. Historically, politically and culturally, Jeddah was a major city of Hejaz Vilayet, the Kingdom of Hejaz and other regional political entities according to Hijazi history books. It is the 100th largest city in the world by land area.

=== Climate ===
Jeddah features an arid climate (BWh) under Köppen climate classification, with a tropical temperature range. Unlike other Saudi Arabian cities, Jeddah retains its warm temperatures in winter, which can range from 15 °C (59 °F) at dawn to 28 °C (82 °F) in the afternoon. Summer temperatures are extremely hot, often breaking the 40 °C (104 °F) mark in the afternoon. Summers are also quite steamy, with dew points often exceeding 27 °C (80 °F), particularly in September.

Rainfall in Jeddah is generally sparse, and usually occurs in small amounts in November and December. Heavy thunderstorms are common in winter. The thunderstorm of December 2008 was the largest in recent memory, with rain reaching around 80 mm (3 in). The lowest temperature ever recorded in Jeddah was 9.8 °C (49.6 °F) on 10 February 1993. The highest temperature ever recorded in Jeddah was 52.0 °C (125.6 °F) on 22 June 2010, which is the highest temperature to have ever been recorded in Saudi Arabia.

Dust storms happen in summer and sometimes in winter, coming from the Arabian Peninsula's deserts or from North Africa. Occasionally, the dust storms accompany thunderstorms.

Climate data for Jeddah (1991–2020, extremes 1991-present)
Month	Jan	Feb	Mar	Apr	May	Jun	Jul	Aug	Sep	Oct	Nov	Dec	Year
Record high °C (°F)	36.0 (96.8)	37.4 (99.3)	40.6 (105.1)	44.5 (112.1)	48.2 (118.8)	52.0 (125.6)	47.0 (116.6)	49.4 (120.9)	49.2 (120.6)	46.4 (115.5)	40.8 (105.4)	37.0 (98.6)	52.0 (125.6)
Mean daily maximum °C (°F)	28.8 (83.8)	29.8 (85.6)	31.7 (89.1)	34.5 (94.1)	37.1 (98.8)	38.3 (100.9)	39.4 (102.9)	38.7 (101.7)	37.4 (99.3)	36.6 (97.9)	33.3 (91.9)	30.6 (87.1)	34.7 (94.5)
Daily mean °C (°F)	23.4 (74.1)	24.0 (75.2)	25.5 (77.9)	28.3 (82.9)	30.7 (87.3)	31.8 (89.2)	33.2 (91.8)	33.2 (91.8)	31.9 (89.4)	30.2 (86.4)	27.6 (81.7)	25.2 (77.4)	28.7 (83.7)
Mean daily minimum °C (°F)	18.8 (65.8)	19.0 (66.2)	20.2 (68.4)	22.8 (73.0)	25.0 (77.0)	25.8 (78.4)	27.6 (81.7)	28.6 (83.5)	27.3 (81.1)	25.0 (77.0)	22.9 (73.2)	20.6 (69.1)	23.6 (74.5)
Record low °C (°F)	11.0 (51.8)	9.8 (49.6)	10.0 (50.0)	12.0 (53.6)	16.4 (61.5)	20.0 (68.0)	20.5 (68.9)	22.0 (71.6)	17.0 (62.6)	15.6 (60.1)	15.0 (59.0)	11.4 (52.5)	9.8 (49.6)
Average precipitation mm (inches)	12.5 (0.49)	3.4 (0.13)	2.6 (0.10)	1.9 (0.07)	0.1 (0.00)	0.1 (0.00)	0.5 (0.02)	0.6 (0.02)	0.1 (0.00)	1.5 (0.06)	27.1 (1.07)	9.1 (0.36)	59.5 (2.32)
Average precipitation days (≥ 1.0 mm)	1.1	0.3	0.4	0.2	0.1	0.0	0.1	0.2	0.0	0.4	1.9	0.7	5.4
Average relative humidity (%)	60	60	60	57	56	58	53	59	67	66	65	63	60
Mean monthly sunshine hours	236.0	232.2	261.0	273.7	300.8	295.8	300.3	278.3	252.7	265.5	246.1	236.2	3,178.6
Source: NOAA, Jeddah Regional Climate Center, DWD(sunshine 1994-2022)

Jeddah mean sea temperature
Jan	Feb	Mar	Apr	May	Jun	Jul	Aug	Sep	Oct	Nov	Dec
26.3 °C (79.3 °F)	25.7 °C (78.3 °F)	25.8 °C (78.4 °F)	26.8 °C (80.2 °F)	28.1 °C (82.6 °F)	29.0 °C (84.2 °F)	30.6 °C (87.1 °F)	31.6 °C (88.9 °F)	31.1 °C (88.0 °F)	30.7 °C (87.3 °F)	29.1 °C (84.4 °F)	27.9 °C (82.2 °F)

== Demographics ==
Population

Historical population

Year	Pop.	±% p.a.
2004	2,803,600	—
2010	3,430,697	+3.42%

Year	Pop.	±% p.a.
2022	3,712,917	+0.66%

Jeddah population increased from 2,803,600 in 2004 to 3,430,697 in 2010, reaching 3,712,917 in the 2022.

== Economy ==
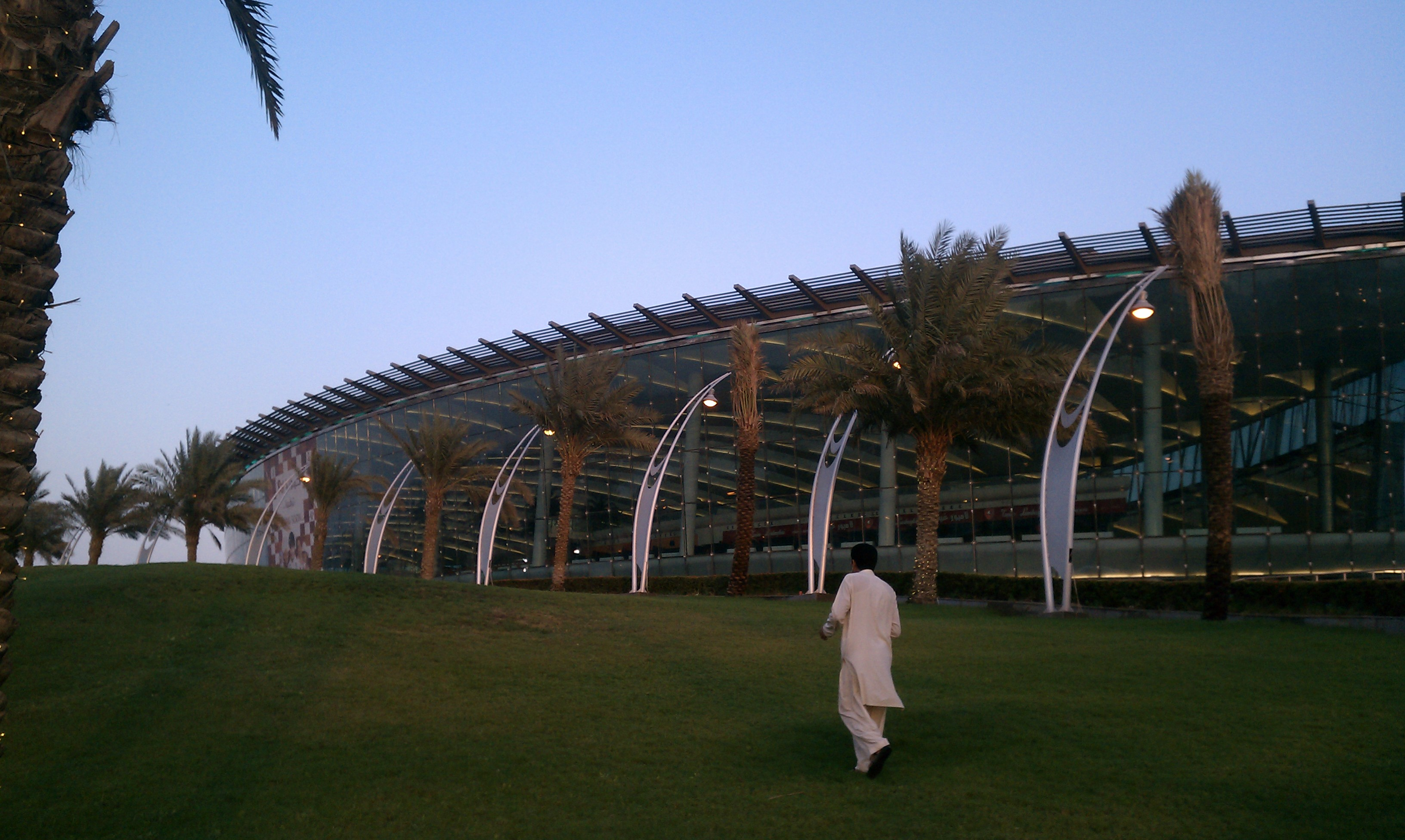
Mall of Arabia is the largest shopping mall in Jeddah.

Jeddah has long been a port city. Even before being designated the port city for Mecca, Jeddah was a trading hub for the region. In the 19th century, goods such as mother-of-pearl, tortoise shells, frankincense, and spices were routinely exported from the city. Apart from this, many imports into the city were destined for further transit to the Suez, Africa, or Europe. Many goods passing through Jeddah could not be normally found in the city or even in Arabia.

All of the capitals of the Middle East and North Africa are within two hours flying distance of Jeddah, making it the second commercial center of the Middle East after Dubai.

Also, Jeddah's industrial district is the fourth largest in Saudi Arabia after Riyadh, Jubail and Yanbu.

=== King Abdullah Street ===
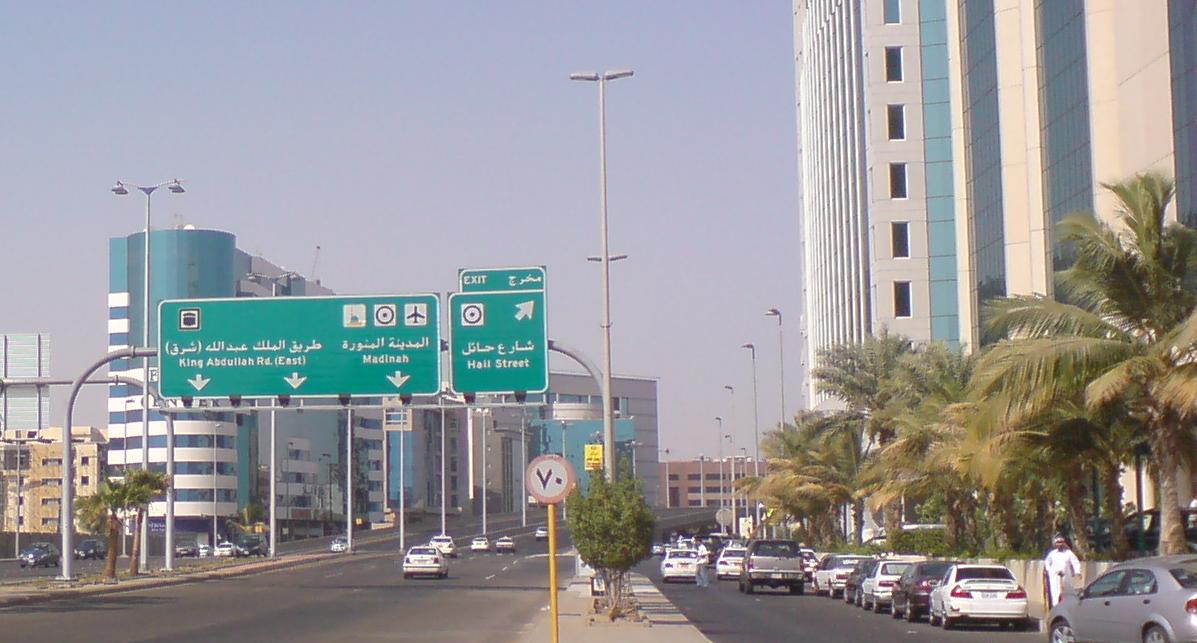
King Abdullah Street

King Abdullah Street is one of the most important streets in Jeddah and runs from King Fahd Road by the waterfront in the west of Jeddah to the eastern end of the city. It is famous for hosting numerous corporate offices and commercial developments. It will be near the HSR Entrance in Jeddah central train station which connects Jeddah with Makkah, Al-Madinah, and King Abdullah Economic City (KAEC). It also has the second tallest flagpole in the world at a height of 170 m (558 ft). This road faced a catastrophe in 2011 when it was submerged in rainwater.

=== Tahliyah Street ===
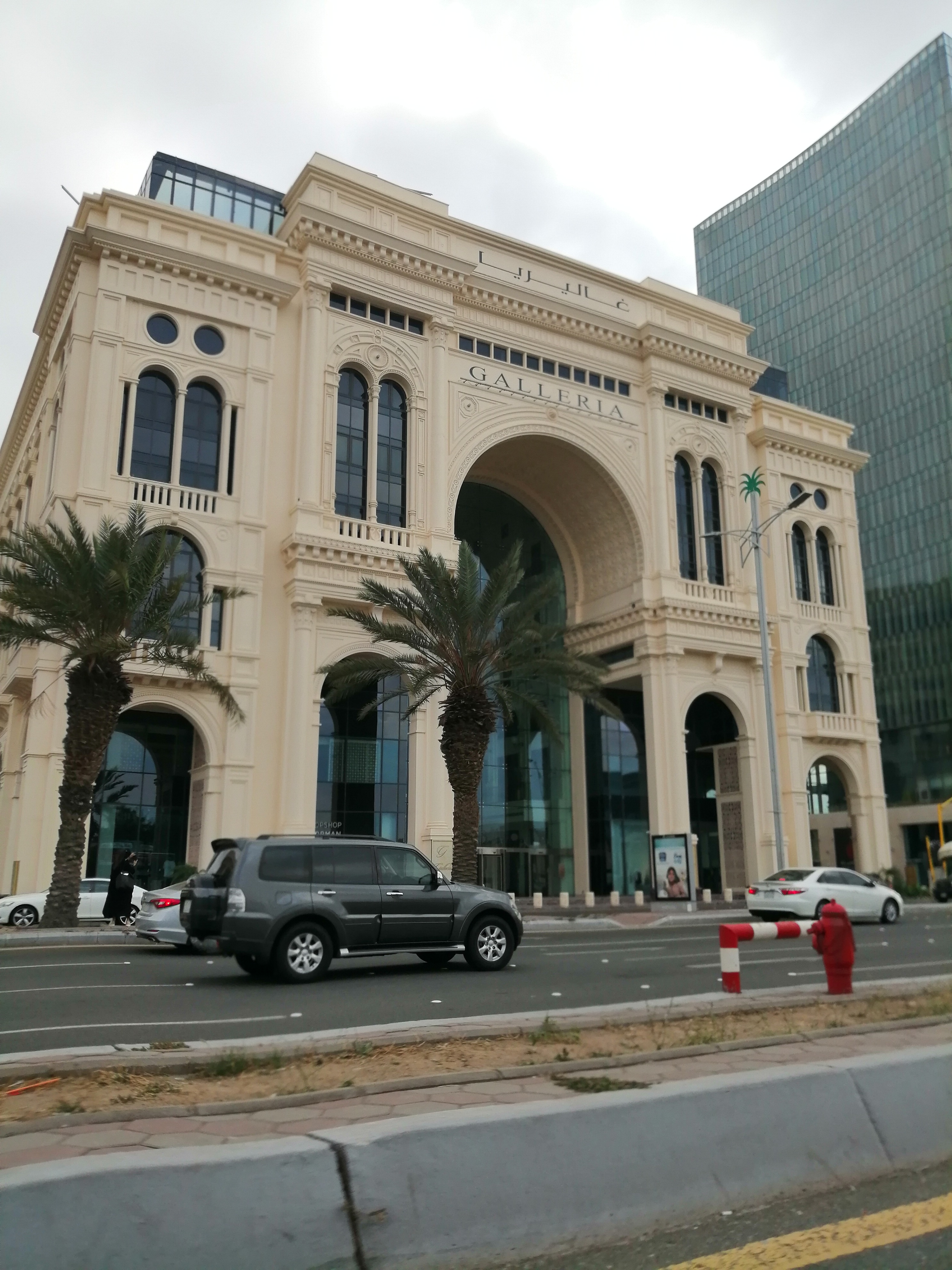
Galleria, a hotel on Tahliyah Street

Tahliyah Street (EXT. Prince Mohamed Bin Abdulaziz St) is an important fashion and shopping street in central Jeddah. It contains many upscale department and high fashion brands stores as well as boutiques. It has been renamed "Prince Mohammad bin Abdul Aziz Road" by the government, but this official name is not widely used. It also has many fine dining options.

=== Madinah Road ===
Madinah Road is a historically significant street in Jeddah. It links the Southern districts with the North and contains the main offices of several companies and showrooms. The northern end of the road links to the King Abdul Aziz Int'l Airport, which is a contributing factor to heavy traffic on this road at most times during the day.

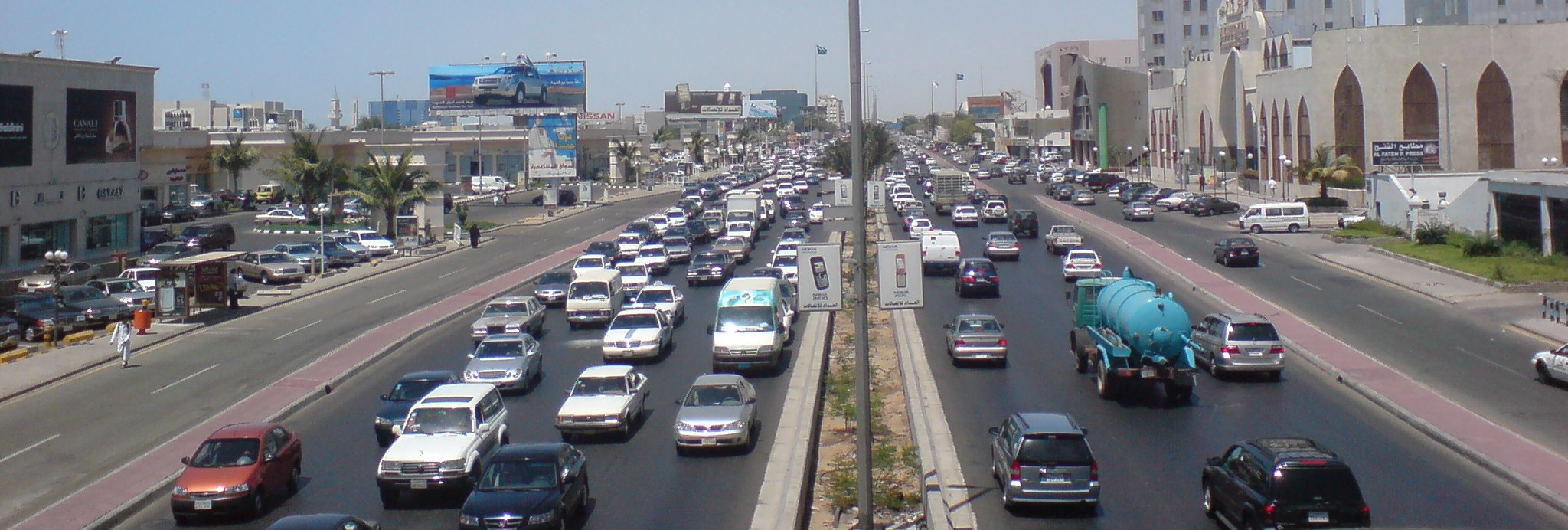
A view of the Madinah Road in 2007

== Culture ==
=== Religious significance ===
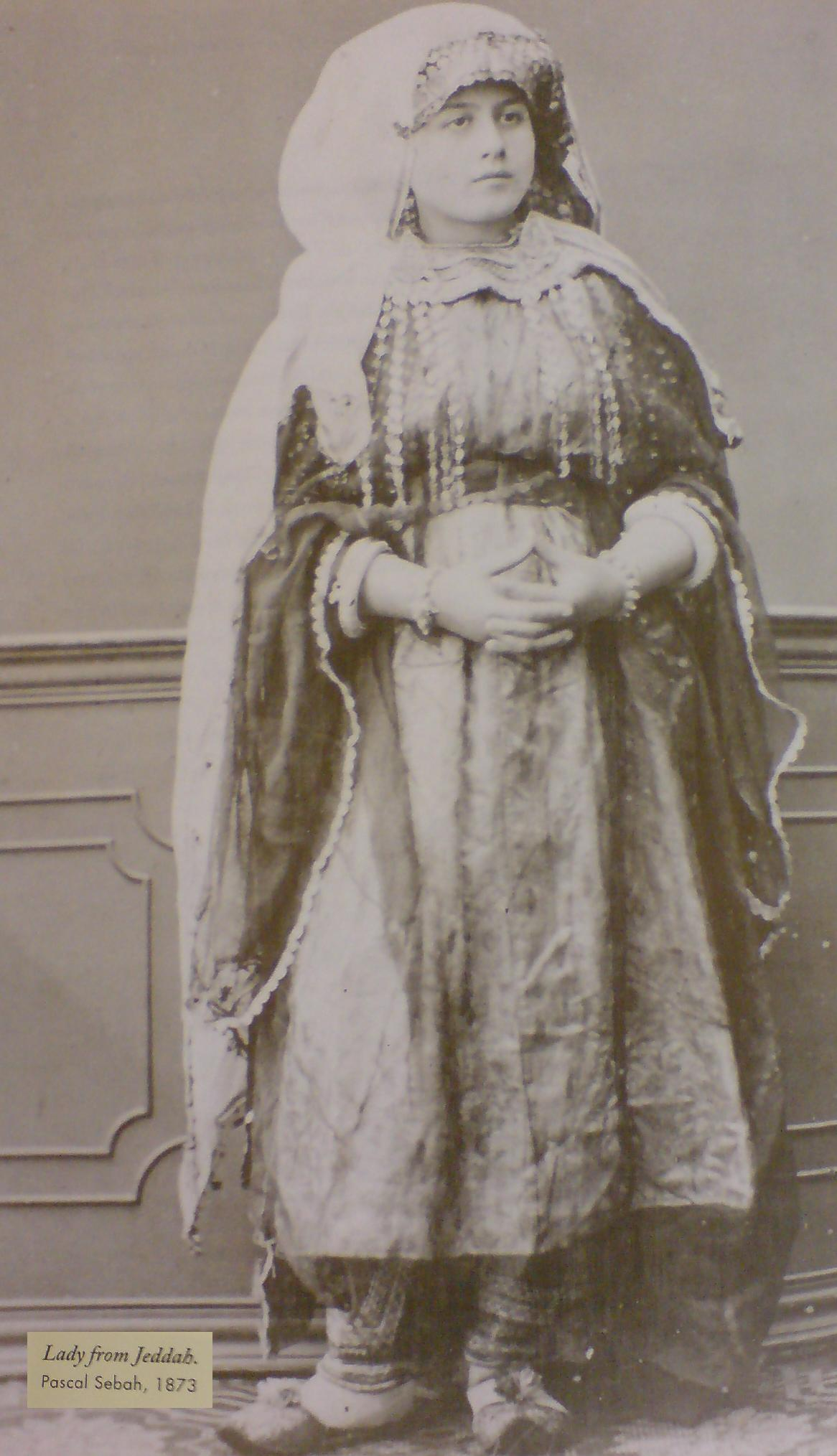
A woman from Jeddah in traditional clothing, 1873

Most citizens are Sunni Muslims. The government, courts, and civil and criminal laws enforce a moral code established by Shari'ah. A very small minority of Saudi citizens are Shia Muslims, and there is also a large foreign workforce, mainly from countries like the Philippines and Pakistan.

The city has over 1,300 mosques. The law does not allow other religions' buildings, books, icons, and expressions of faith. However, private religious observance not involving Muslims nor offending public order and morality is tolerated.

Since the 7th century, Jeddah has hosted millions of Muslim pilgrims from all over the world on their way to the Hajj. This merge with pilgrims has a major impact on the society, religion, and economy of Jeddah.

=== Cuisine ===
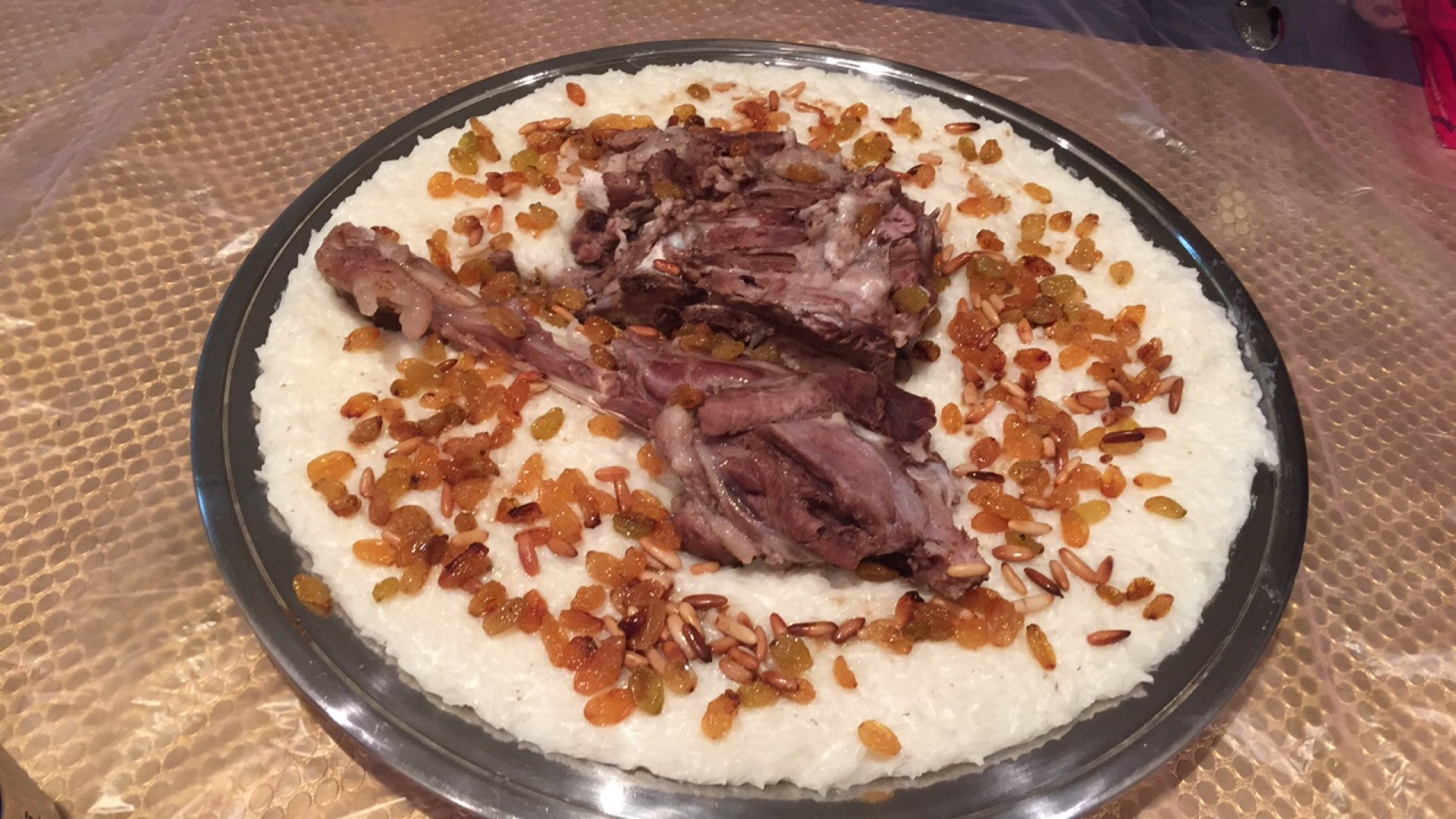
Hejazi Saleeg

Jeddah's multi-ethnic citizenry has influenced Jeddah's traditional cuisine.

Some dishes are native to the Hejaz, like Saleeg. Mabshūr (مَبْشُور) is a white-rice dish, cooked in broth, often made with chicken instead of lamb meat. Jeddah cuisine is popular as well, with dishes like Foul, Shorabah Hareira (Hareira soup), Mugalgal, Madhbi (chicken grilled on stone), Madfun (literally meaning "buried"), Magloobah, Kibdah, Manzalah (usually eaten at Eid ul-Fitr), Magliya (a local version of falafel) and Saiyadyia able to be acquired in many traditional restaurants around the city.

Some dishes popular in the city were imported from other Saudi regions, like Kabsa from Najd and Arīka (عَريكة) and Ma'sūb (مَعْصُوب) from the southern Saudi region. Other dishes were imported from other cultures through Saudis of different origins, like Mantu, Yaghmush (يَغْمُش) and Ruz Bukhāri (رُز بُخاري) from Central Asia, Burēk, Šurēk, and Kabab Almīru (كباب الميرو) from Turkey and the Balkans, Mandi from Yemen, Mutabbag (مُطَبَّق) from Yemen-Malaysia, Biryāni and Kābli (كابلي) rice dishes from South Asia.

The most popular local fast-food chain, begun in 1974, is Al Baik, with branches in Jeddah and the neighboring cities of Makkah, Madinah and Yanbu. Their main dish is broasted (broiled and roasted) chicken, commonly known by Jeddawis as "Broast", and a variety of seafood. The popular fast food chain recently started opening branches internationally including Bahrain, and Dubai in the UAE.

=== Open-air art ===
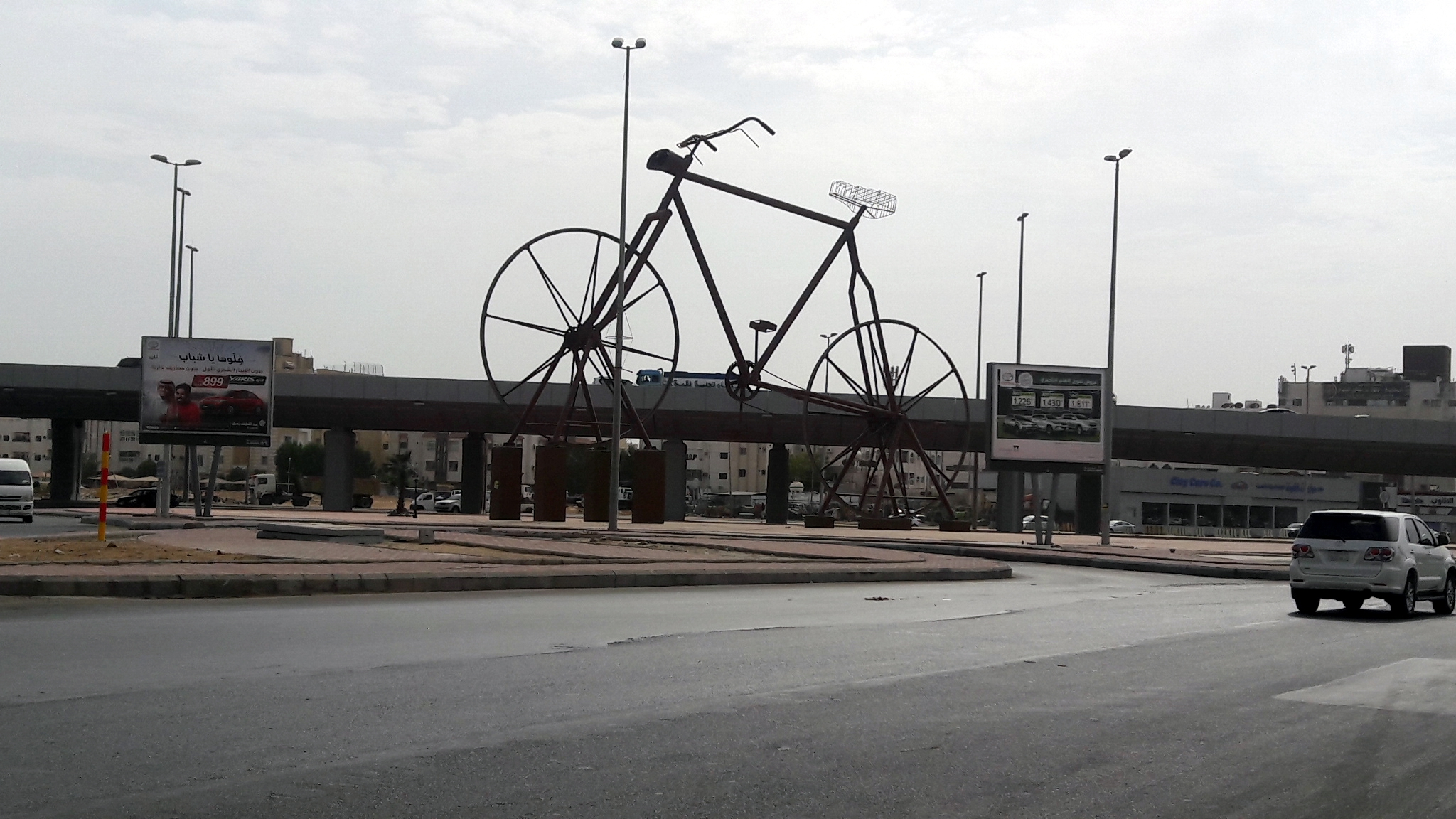
The bicycle roundabout is one of the most iconic open-air art installations in Jeddah.

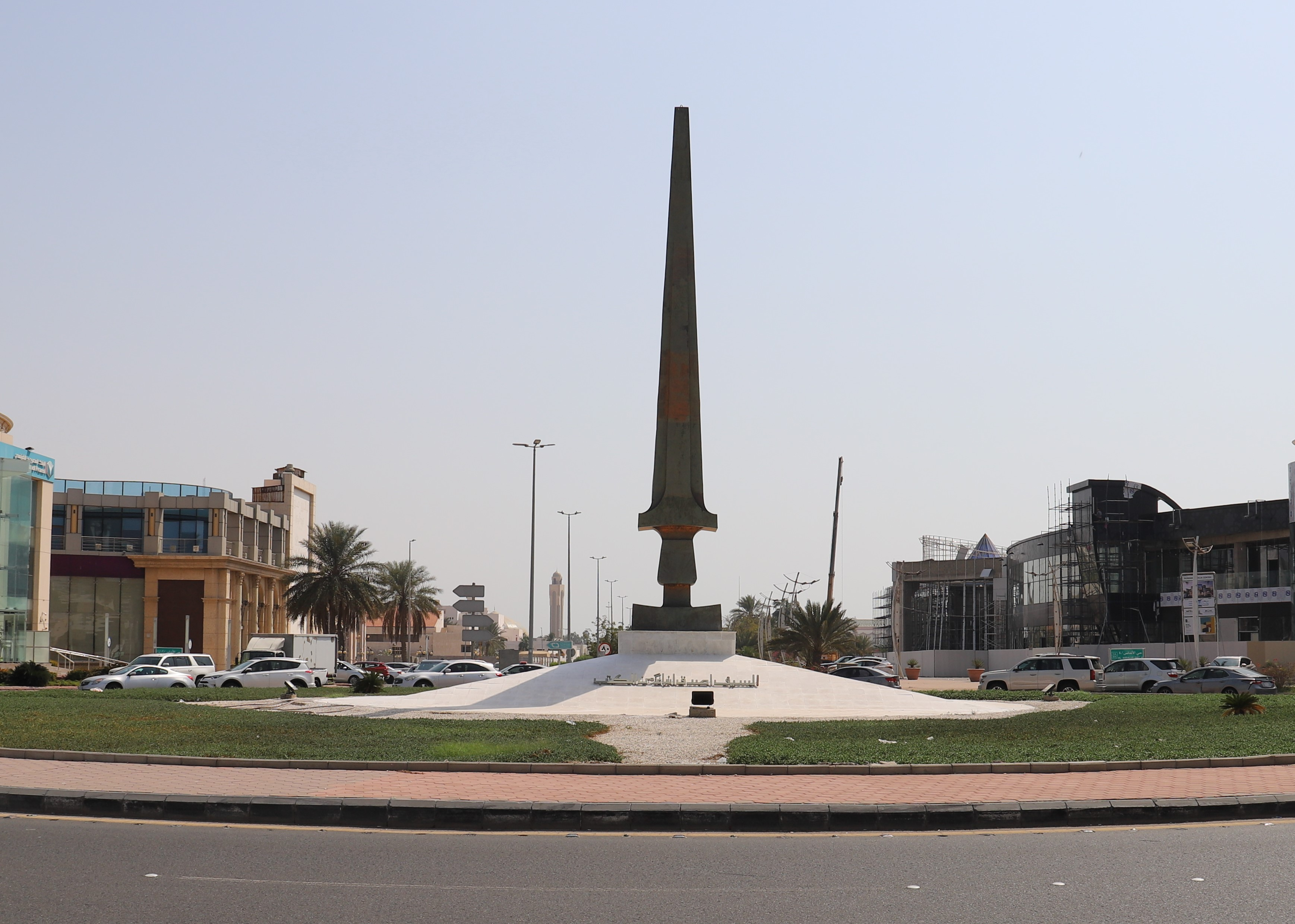
Copper statue Hope for the Right Path from Belgian artist Hubert Minnebo at the Sword Roundabout (Tahlia Street)

During the oil boom in the late 1970s and 1980s, there was a focused civic effort led by Mohamed Said Farsi, who was then the city's mayor, to bring art to Jeddah's public areas. As a result, Jeddah contains a large number of modern open-air sculptures and works of art, typically situated in roundabouts. Sculptures include works by Jean/Hans Arp, César Baldaccini, Alexander Calder, Henry Moore, Joan Miró, Hubert Minnebo and Victor Vasarely. They often depict traditional Saudi items such as coffee pots, incense burners, palm trees, etc. Islamic tradition prohibits the depiction of living creatures, especially the human form, and this has affected the art. Other statues include a giant geometry set, a giant bicycle, a huge block of concrete with several cars protruding from it at odd angles, and a monumental sculpture by Aref Rayess called "Swords of God (Soyuf Allah)". At the interchange between Al-Madinah Road, King Abdulaziz Road, and Prince Abullah Al-Faisal Road, there are large sculptures of camels that are the center of a roundabout. The roundabout is commonly known as 'The Camel Roundabout'.

=== Museums and collections ===
There are about a dozen museums or collections in Jeddah, with varied educational aims and professionalism. These include the Jeddah Regional Museum of Archaeology and Ethnography run by the Deputy Ministry of Antiquities and Museums, the Jeddah Municipal Museum, the Nasseef House, the Humane Heritage Museum, the private Abdul Rauf Hasan Khalil Museum and the private Arts Heritage Museum.

=== Events and festivals ===
==== Red Sea International Film Festival ====
Jeddah was selected as the place for the annual Red Sea International Film Festival that was held in 2020.

==== Jeddah International Book Fair ====
Jeddah hosts an annual international book fair called Jeddah International Book Fair. It is the second largest book fair in Saudi Arabia, and it was first held in 2015. The book fair is held annually in early December.

==== Jeddah Season ====
Jeddah Season is a part of the Saudi government's Saudi Seasons initiative that aims at launching high-level tourism activities in Saudi Arabia. The first version of the season was held in June–July 2019. Around 150 activities and events were organized in five destinations in Jeddah. Saudi Seasons 2019 aimed at shedding light on the diverse Saudi culture and heritage. Jeddah was chosen because it is one of the most culturally-rich Saudi cities, with a history that spans over 3,000 years. Most of Jeddah Season's events and activities were held at King Abdullah Sports City, Jeddah's historical area, Al-Hamra Corniche, and the Jeddah Waterfront. Jeddah Season aims to make Jeddah the most preferred tourist destination in the world and the best season of all the Saudi Seasons.

=== Media ===
Jeddah is served by four major Arabic-language newspapers, Asharq Al-Awsat, Al Madina, Okaz, and Al Bilad, as well as two major English-language newspapers, the Saudi Gazette and Arab News (which also covers other Middle Eastern events). Okaz and Al-Madina are the primary newspapers of Jeddah and some other Saudi cities, with over a million readers; their focus is mainly local.

Internet blogs specifically informative of the locality are abundant in Jeddah, catering mostly to the widespread expatriate population. Of these are constituted websites that have garnered international acclaim for informativeness, such as Jeddah Blog, the recipient of the Bronze Expat Blog Award in 2012 and the Gold Award in 2013 and among Feedspot's Top 100 Middle East blogs. Other amateur websites relating to specific topics in the region exist as well.

Jeddah represents the largest radio and television market in Saudi Arabia. Television stations serving the city area include Saudi TV1, Saudi TV2, Saudi TV Sports, Al Ekhbariya, the ART channels network and hundreds of cable, satellite, and other specialty television providers.

The Jeddah TV Tower is a 250 m (820 ft) high television tower with an observation deck.

=== Accent ===
The Jeddah region's distinctive speech pattern is called the Hejazi dialect. It is among the most recognizable of all accents in the Arabic language.

== Cityscape ==
Jeddah
UNESCO World Heritage Site
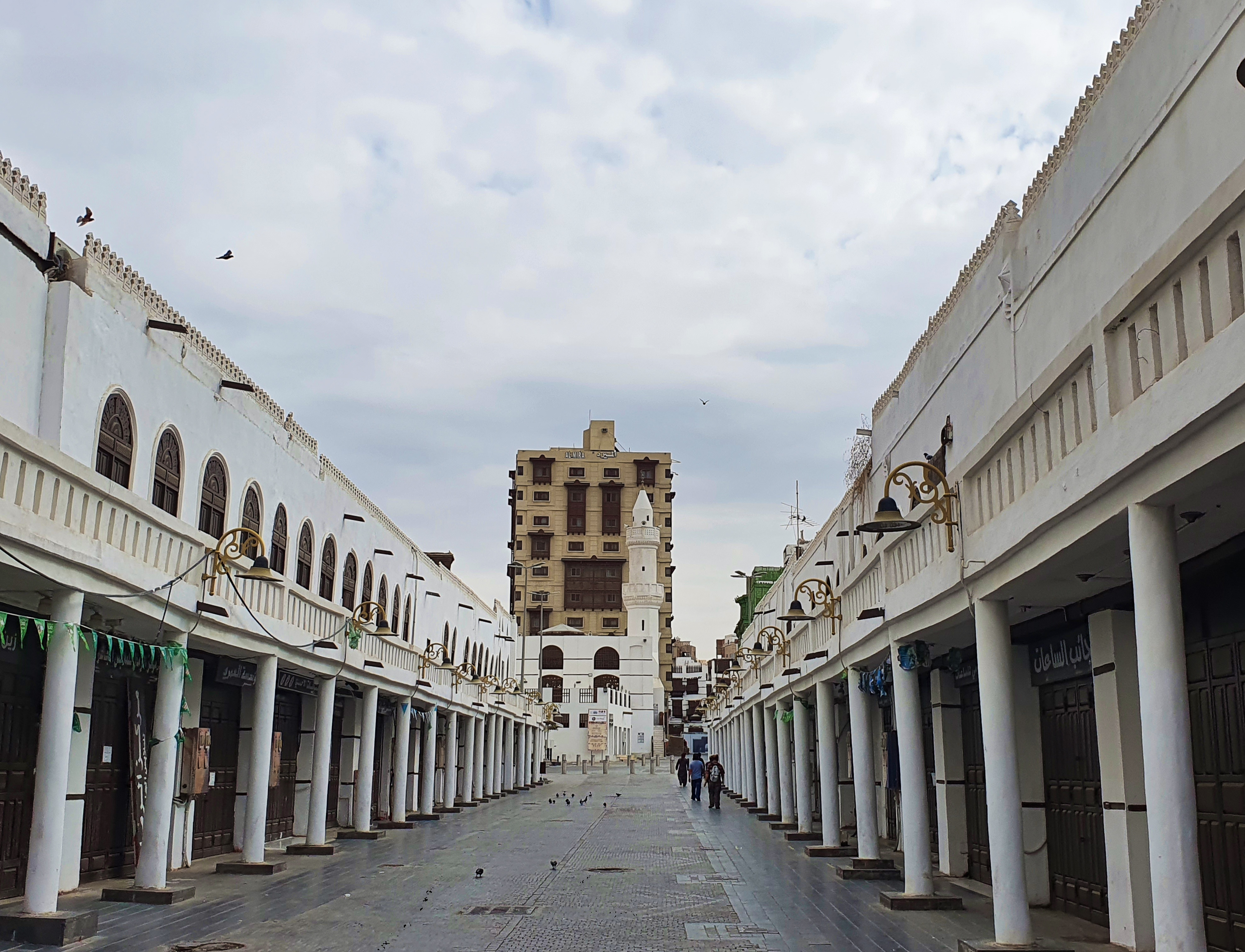
- A market street in Old Jeddah with the al-Mimar Mosque in the background.
- Interactive map of Jeddah
- Official name: Historic Jeddah, the Gate to Makkah
- Criteria: Cultural: (ii), (iv), (vi)
- Reference: 1361bis
- Inscription: 2014 (38th Session)
- Area: 17.92 ha (44.3 acres)

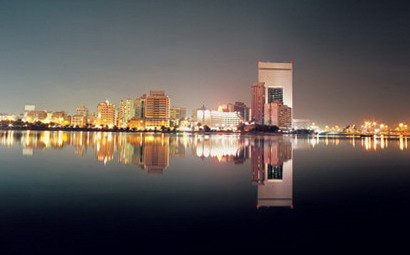
Skyline of Al-Balad (Jeddah Downtown)

=== Old Jeddah ===
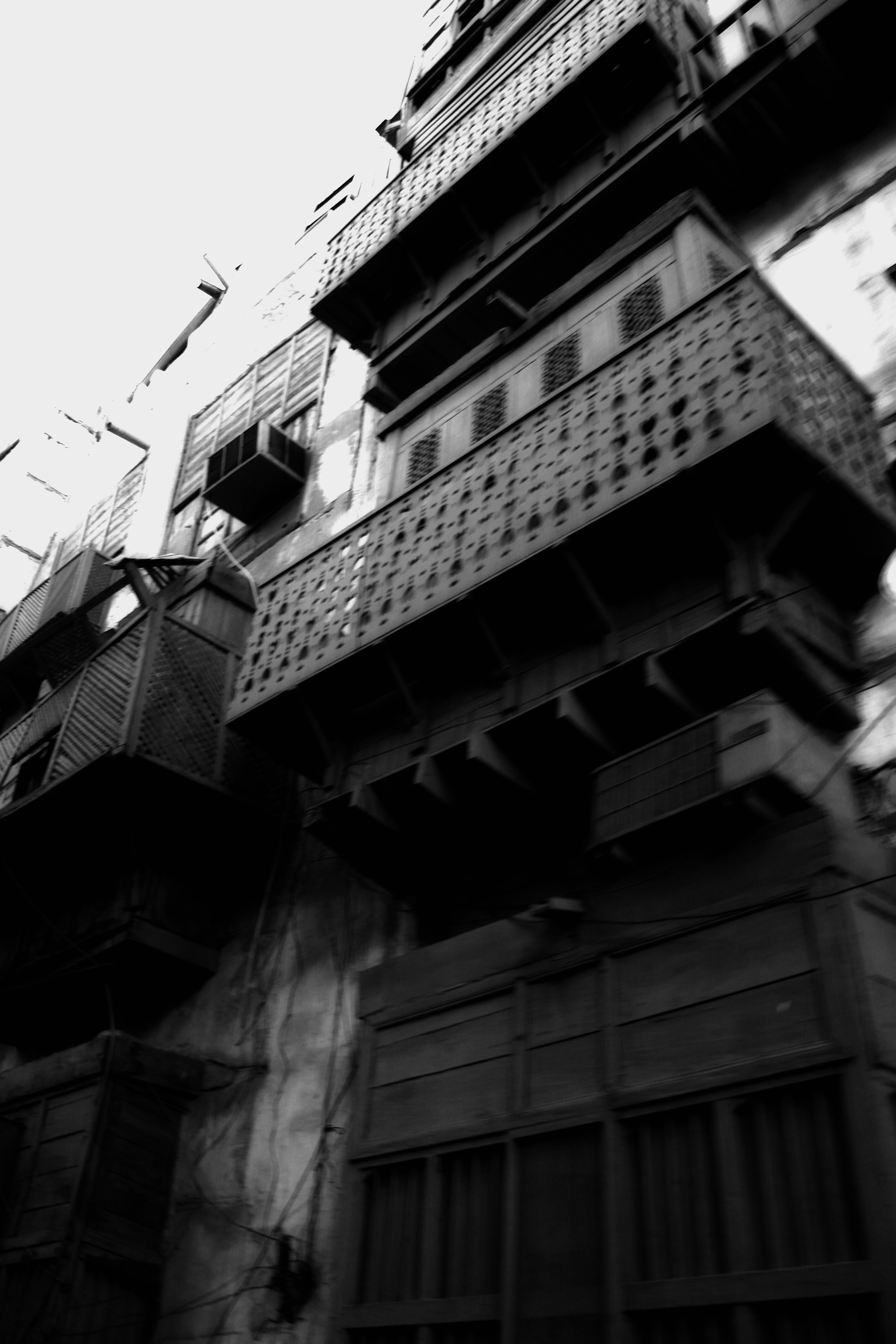
The architecture of buildings in Jeddah's historic Al-Balad area

The Old City known as Al-Balad, with its traditional multistory buildings and merchant houses that often still belong to the families that inhabited them before the oil-era, has lost ground to more modern developments. Nonetheless, the Old City contributes to the cultural identity of Jeddah and the Hijaz more generally. Since it was granted UNESCO World Heritage status, in 2014, several traditional buildings have been restored and made open to the public. In 2019, the Saudi crown prince, Muhammad bin Salman, issued a royal decree ordering the Ministry of Culture to restore 50 historical buildings in Jeddah. Several historic mosques from different eras are located in al-Balad, as well as one of the oldest museums in the city, called Bayt Naseef (the House of Naseef), which displays local furniture and interior design from the past 150 years, approximately.

=== Resorts and hotels ===
The city has many popular resorts, including Durrat Al-Arus, Al-Nawras Mövenpick resort at the Red Sea Corniche, Crystal Resort, Radisson Blu, The Signature Al Murjan Beach Resort, Al Nakheel Village, Sands, and Sheraton Abhur. Many are renowned for their preserved Red Sea marine life and offshore coral reefs.

=== Consulates ===
One of the two consulates of the United States of America in Saudi Arabia is located in Jeddah, along with the consulates for 67 other countries such as Afghanistan, the United Kingdom, Indonesia, France, Germany, Greece, Turkey, Philippines, India, Pakistan, Bangladesh, Italy, Russia and Mainland China. Some of the other consulates present include countries of the Organization of Islamic Cooperation and the Arab League states.

== Historical Jeddah ==
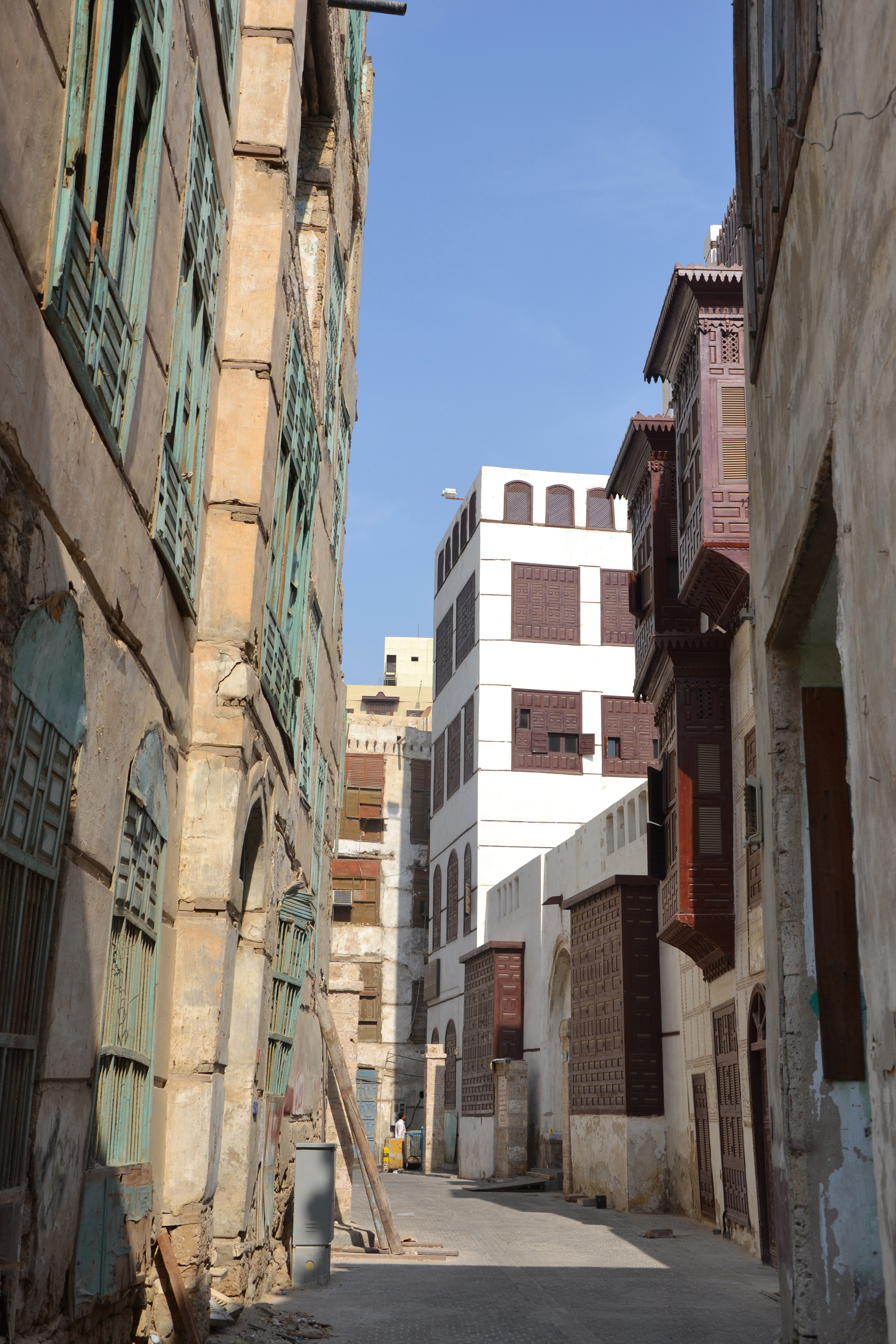
The historic center

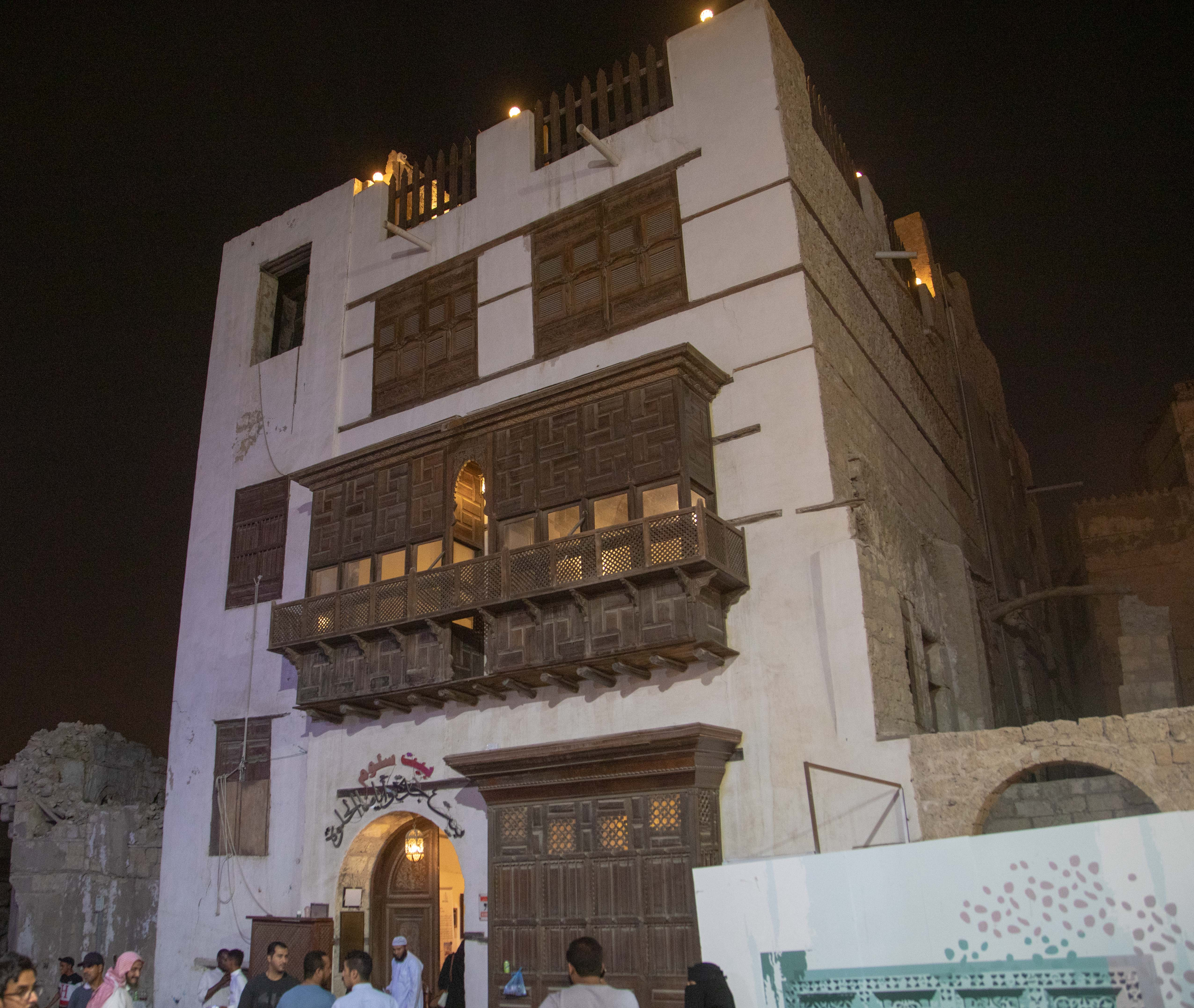
Saloom's house in historical Jeddah

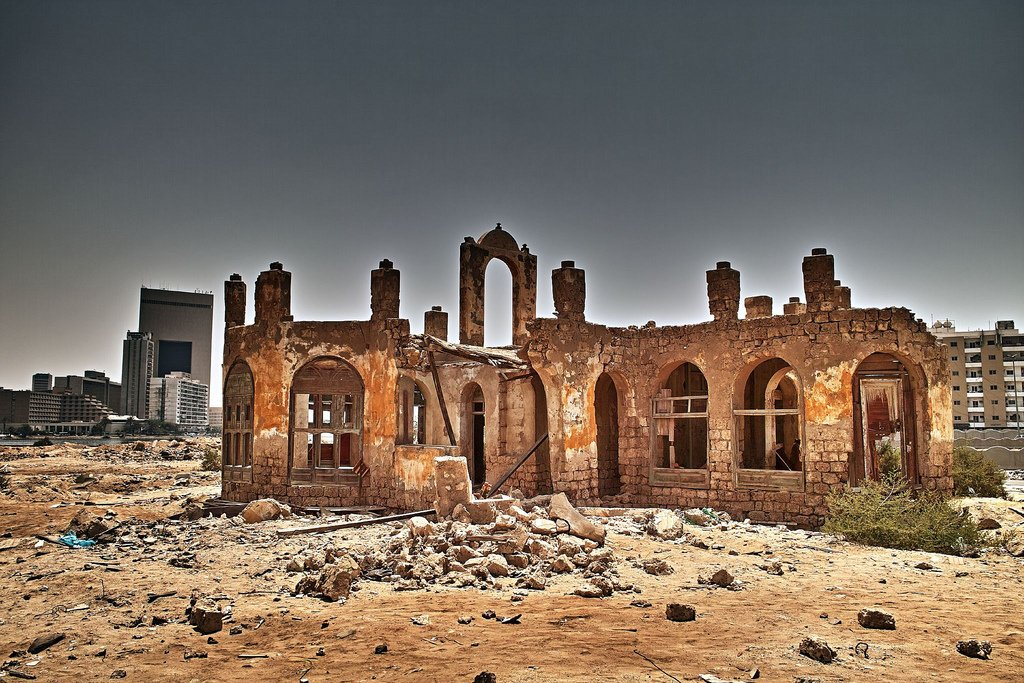
Old Dutch Christian church ruins in Jeddah

Historical Jeddah is situated on the eastern shore of the Red Sea. From the 7th century AD, it was established as a major port for Indian Ocean trade routes, channeling goods to Mecca. It was also the gateway for Muslim pilgrims to Mecca who arrived by sea. These twin roles saw the city develop into a thriving multicultural center, characterized by a distinctive architectural tradition, including tower houses built in the late 19th century by the city's mercantile elites, and combining Red Sea coastal coral building traditions with influences and crafts from along the trade routes.

Within a defensive wall that was built during Ottoman rule, the old city of Jeddah, Al-Balad, was divided into districts, or Haras, where business and trade centered around traditional souks, or market places, and khans, covered markets that were generally connected to shops.

=== Harrat Al-Mathloum (District of the Wronged) ===
Located in the northeast of Jeddah, this district was named after Abdulkarim Al-Barzangi, a Hijazi rebel who was crucified by the Ottomans. Some of its landmarks are:

- Dar Al-Qabil
- Dar Al-Ba'ashin
- Dar Al-Sheikh
- The Al-Shafi'i mosque

The oldest mosque in town, its minaret was built in the 13th century, and its pillars date back to Ottoman rule.

- Mosque of Uthman bin Affan

Also called the Ebony Mosque because of its two ebony pillars, it was mentioned in the writings of Ibn Battuta and Ibn Jubayr.

- Al-Mia'mar Mosque

An old mosque built in the 17th century.

- Souq Al-Jama

One of the oldest markets in town.

=== Harrat Al-Sham (The Levantine District) ===
Located in the north and named after its orientation, some of its landmarks are:

- Dar Al-Sadat
- Dar Al-Serti
- Dar Al-Zahid
- Dar Al-Banajah
- Al-Basha Mosque

Built by Bakr Basha, the governor of Jeddah in 1735.

=== Harrat Al-Yemen (The Yemeni District) ===
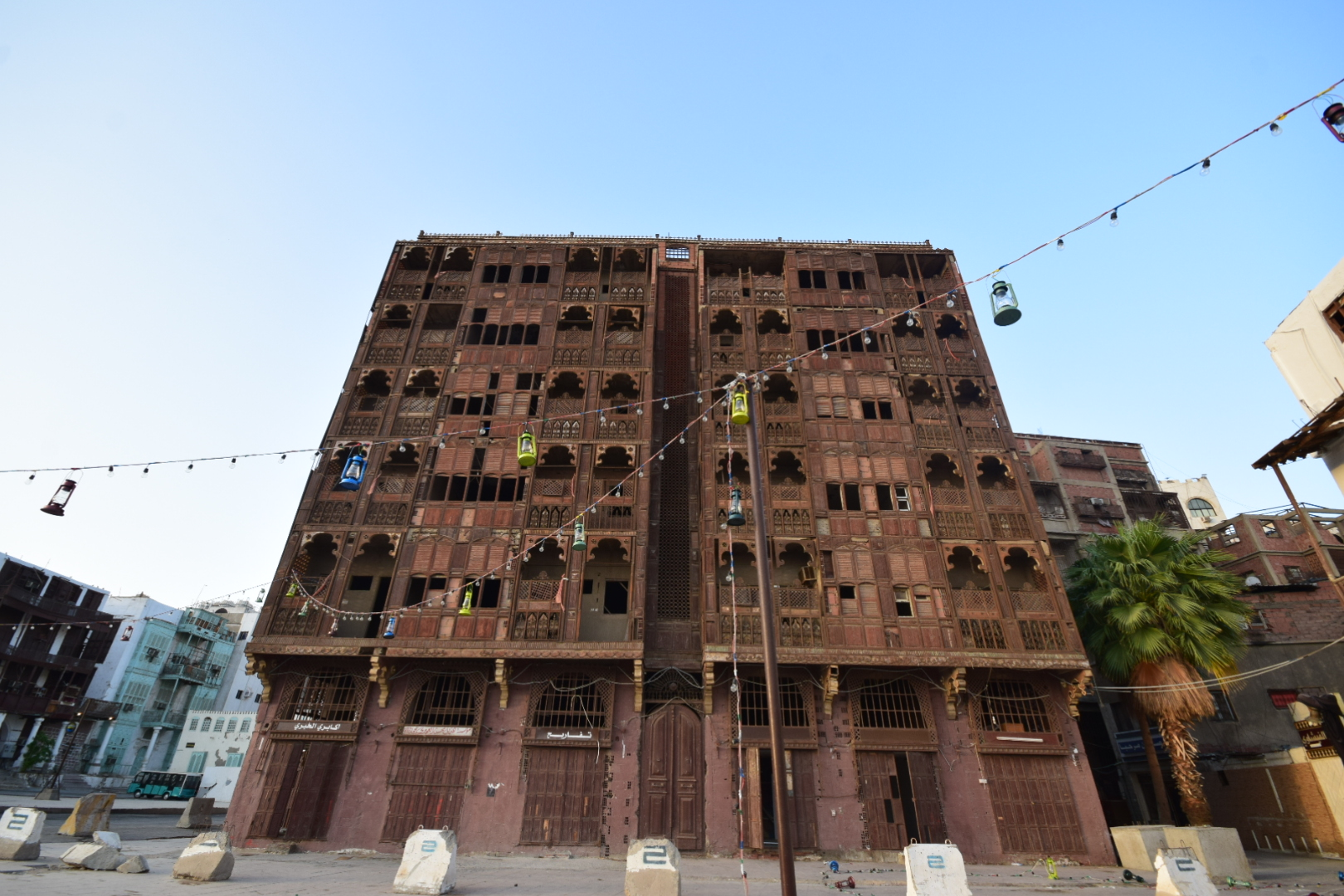
Bait Bajanaid

Located in the south and also named after its orientation, its landmarks include:

- Bait Nasseef

By far the most famous site in the old town, it was built in 1881 for Omar Nasseef Efendi, governor of Jeddah at the time, and served as the royal residence of King Abdulaziz after he conquered the city.

- Dar Al-Jamjoom
- Dar Al-Sha'araoui
- Dar Al-Abdulsamad
- Dar Al-Kayal
- Bait Al-Matbouli
- Bait Al-Joghadar

=== Harrat Al-Bahar (The Seafront District) ===
Located in the southwest, some of its landmarks are:

- Dar Al-Nas
- Dar Al-Radwan
- Dar Al-Nimr

== Main sights ==
=== Abdul Raouf Khalil Museum ===
Founded by Sheikh Abdul Raouf Khalil in 1996, this museum not only presents the rich Islamic cultural heritage of the city, but also its pre-Islamic history that goes back 2500 years; it traces the various civilizations that inhabited the region. Located in the downtown district, it boasts a large collection of items and artifacts that belonged to the Ottoman Turks and the fishermen tribes who were the first inhabitants of the region.

=== King Fahd's Fountain ===
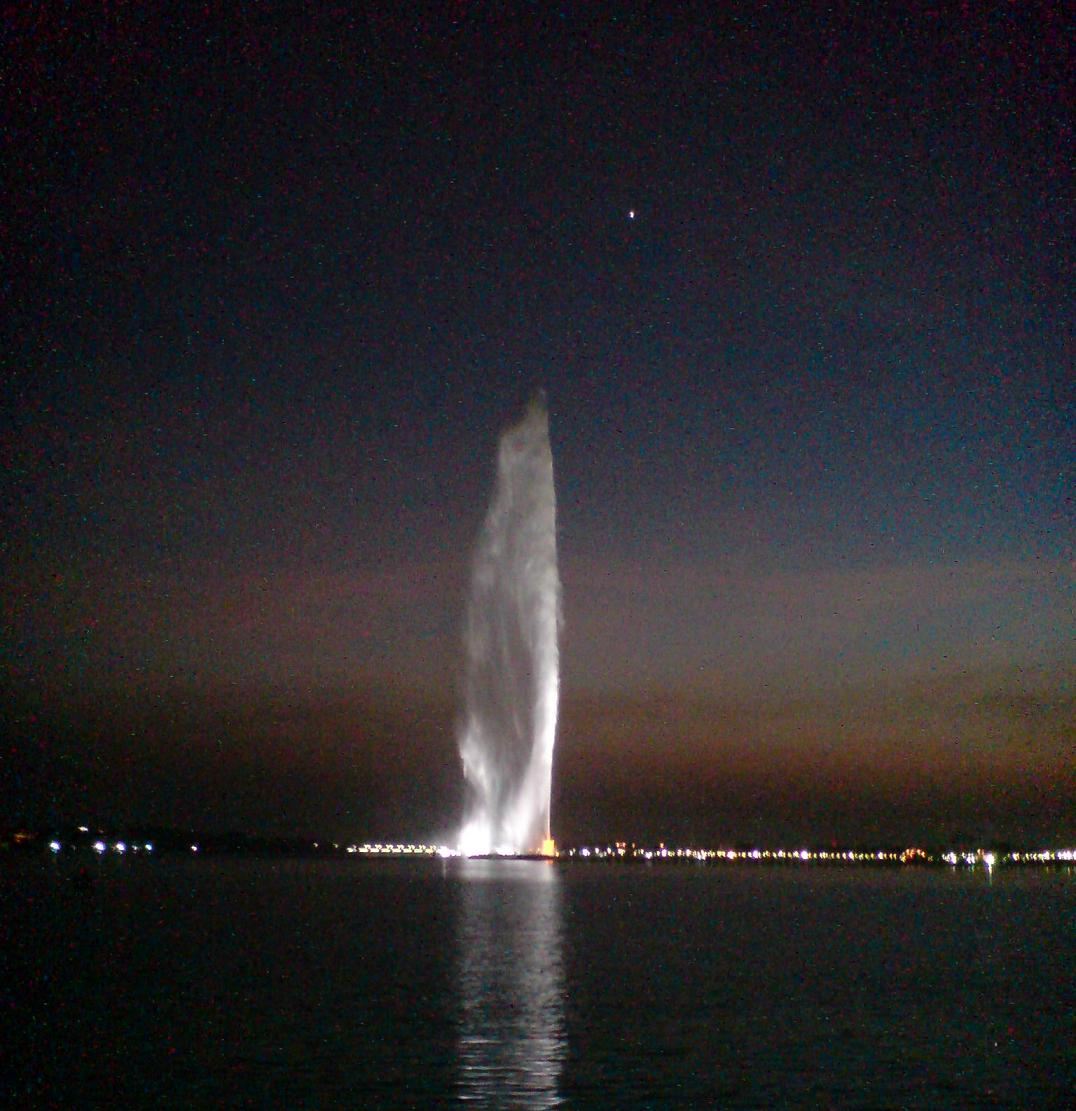
King Fahd's Fountain in Jeddah

King Fahd's Fountain was built in the 1980s and can be seen from a great distance. At 312 meters (1,024 ft), the Fahd Fountain is the highest water jet in the world, according to the Guinness World Records. The fountain was donated to the City of Jeddah by the late King Fahd bin Abdul Aziz, after whom it was named.

=== Al-Rahmah Mosque ===
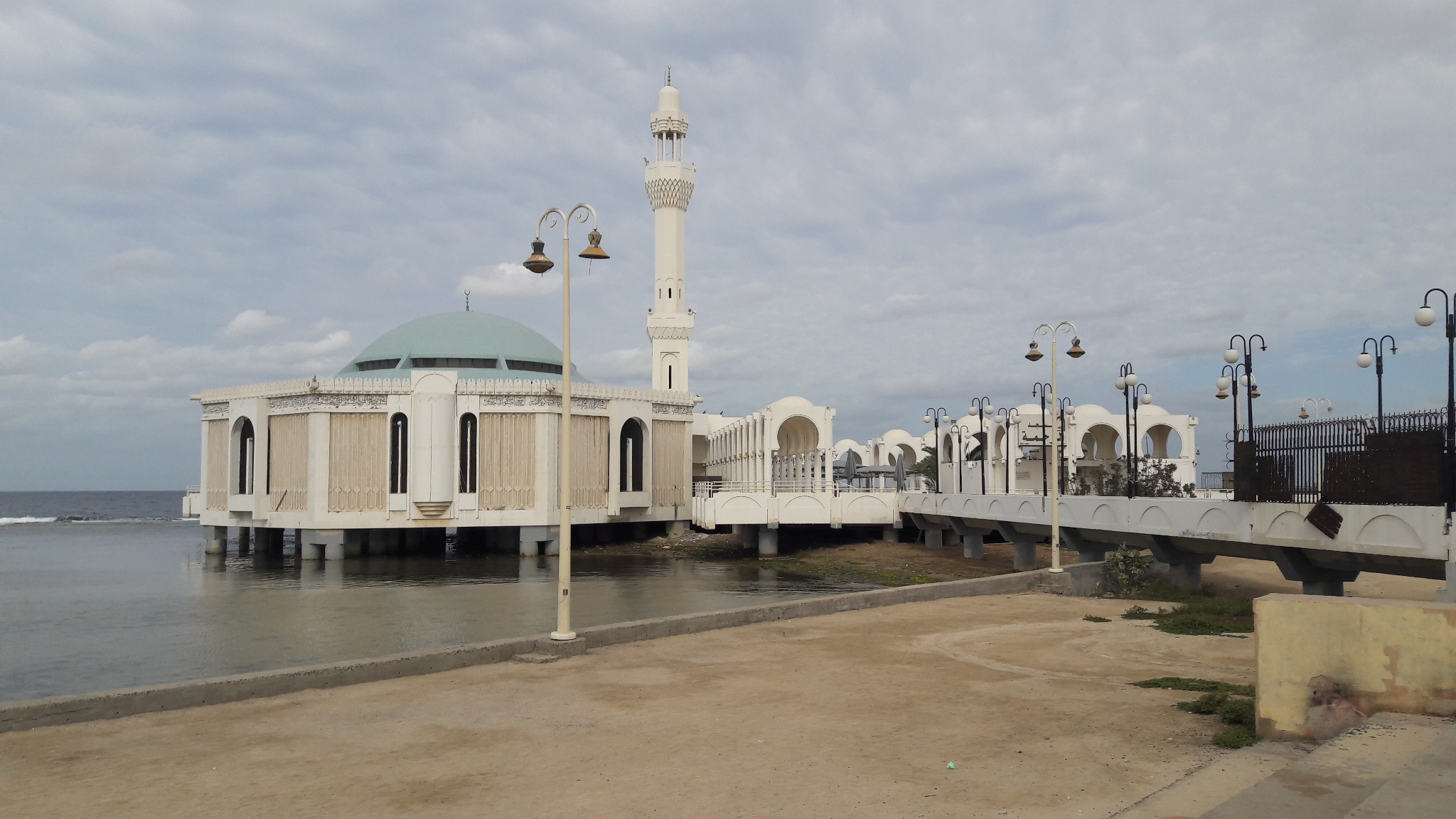
Al-Rahmah Mosque

Sometimes referred to as the floating mosque because of its location above water, this mix of old and new architecture was built in 1985. It is a popular spot among tourists and natives looking to lounge by the seaside.

=== King Saud Mosque ===
Built in 1987 by Egyptian architect Abdel Wahed El Wakil, King Saud Mosque is the largest mosque in the city, displaying beautiful Islamic architecture.

=== King Abdullah Sports City ===
King Abdullah Sports City is a multi-use stadium used mostly for association football. It opened in 2014 north of Jeddah and has a full capacity of 62,241 spectators. It is the largest stadium in Jeddah, and the second-largest in Saudi Arabia.

=== NCB Tower ===
Built in 1983 and believed to be the highest tower in Saudi Arabia during the 1980s, with a height of over 235 m (771 ft), the National Commercial Bank was Saudi Arabia's first bank.

=== IDB Tower ===
The IDB Jeddah tower can be seen in the background of this mosque

The Islamic Development Bank is a multilateral development financing institution. It was founded by the first conference of Finance Ministers of the Organisation of the Islamic Conference (OIC, now the Organization of Islamic Cooperation), first convened on 18 December 1973. The bank officially began its activities on 20 October 1975.

=== Jeddah Municipality Tower ===
This is the headquarters of the metropolitan area of Jeddah. The municipality's new building is going to be not only Jeddah's tallest but is also going to dethrone the Burj Khalifa.

This proposed tower, formerly known as the Kingdom Tower, is being built in Jeddah by Prince Al-Waleed bin Talal and will stand 1-kilometer (0.62 mi) tall. Upon its completion, it will be the tallest skyscraper in the world. The building has been scaled down from its initial 1.6 km (1 mi) proposal, since the ground proved unsuitable for a building that tall, to a height of at least 1,000 meters (3,280.84 ft) (the exact height is being kept private while in development, similar to the Burj Khalifa), which, at about one kilometer (0.62 miles), would still make it by far the tallest building or structure in the world to date, standing at least 173 m (568 ft) taller than the Burj Khalifa in Dubai. Construction began in April 2013 and there was steady progress, but in January 2018, building owner JEC halted structural concrete work with the tower about one-third completed due to labor issues with a contractor following the 2017–19 Saudi Arabian purge. JEC had said they planned to restart construction in 2020. In September 2023 MEED reported that the construction of the tower had restarted. Completion is expected in 2029.

=== King Road Tower ===
King Road Tower is a commercial and office building, the external walls of which are used to show commercials. The building also has a helipad on its roof. King Road Tower has the largest LED display in the world on its walls.

=== Al Jawharah Tower ===
Al Jawharah Tower is a residential high-rise; it became the third-tallest structure in Jeddah when completed in 2014.

=== Jeddah Tower ===
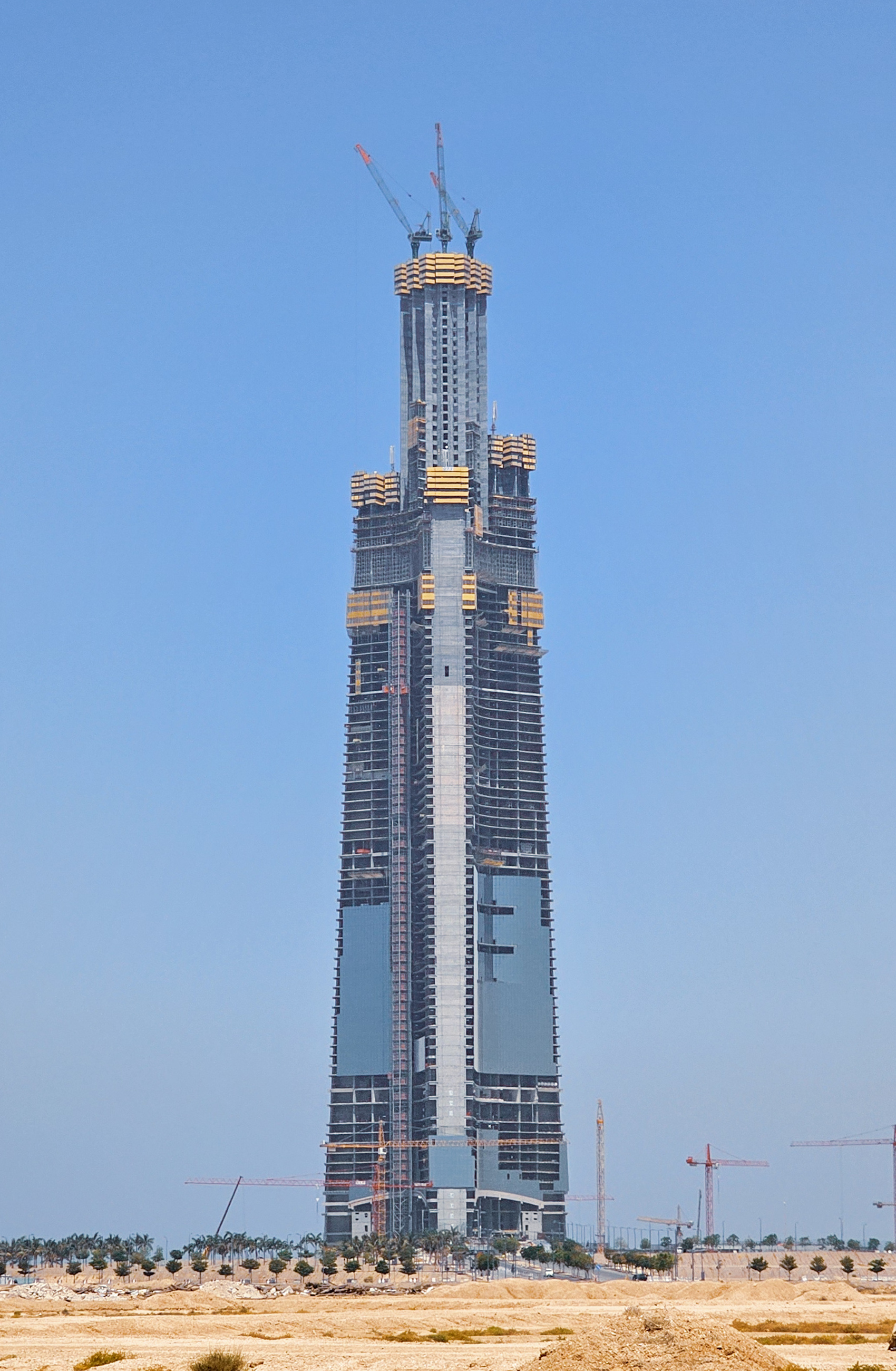
Jeddah Tower under construction

Jeddah Tower is planned to be the first 1-kilometre-tall building and, it is set to become the world’s tallest building or structure.

=== Jeddah Flagpole ===
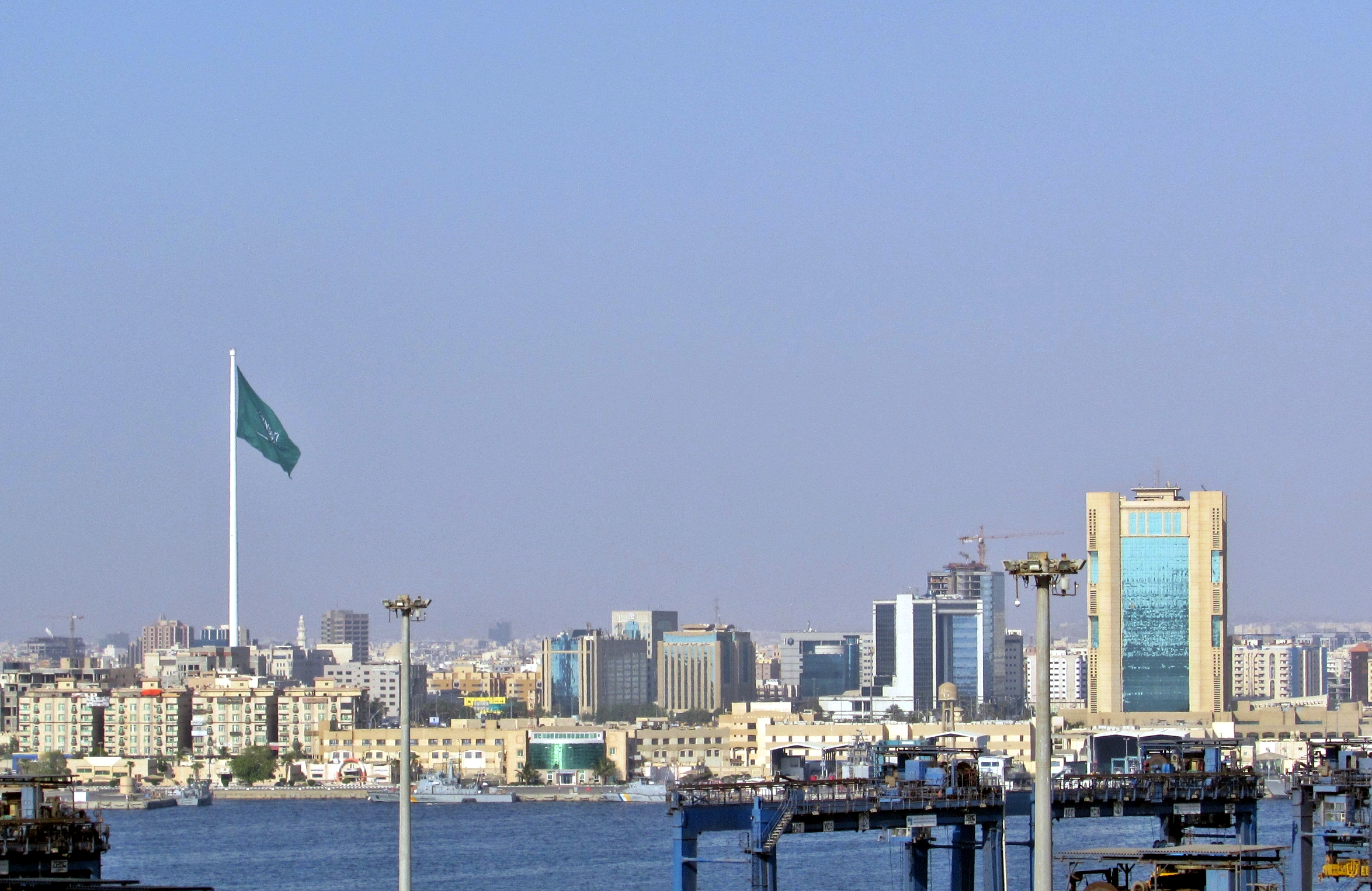
Jeddah's flagpole

The King Abdullah Square on the intersection of Andalus Road with King Abdullah Road had the world's tallest flagpole. It is 171 meters (561 feet) high and the Saudi flag atop it weighs 570 kilograms (1,260 pounds). On the 84th Saudi Arabia National Day, on 23 September 2014, a huge Saudi flag was hoisted on the flagpole before a crowd of thousands. The flagpole succeeded Dushanbe Flagpole as the tallest flagpole in the world until 26 December 2021, when the Cairo Flagpole in Cairo, Egypt was erected at a height of 201.952 m (662.57 ft).

=== Entrance of Mecca ===
Bab Makkah, also known as Makkah Gate, is a limestone coral gateway that leads into the historic Al-Balad district of Jeddah.

The Makkah Gate, named the "Quran Gate", is located 60 km outside Jeddah on the Makkah Mukkarram road of the Jeddah–Makkah Highway. It is the entrance to Mecca and the birthplace of Muhammad. The gate signifies the boundary of the Haram area of the city of Makkah, where non-Muslims are prohibited to enter. The gate was designed in 1979 by Egyptian architect Samir Elabd for the architectural firm IDEA Center. The structure is that of a book, representing the Quran, sitting on a rehal, or book stand.

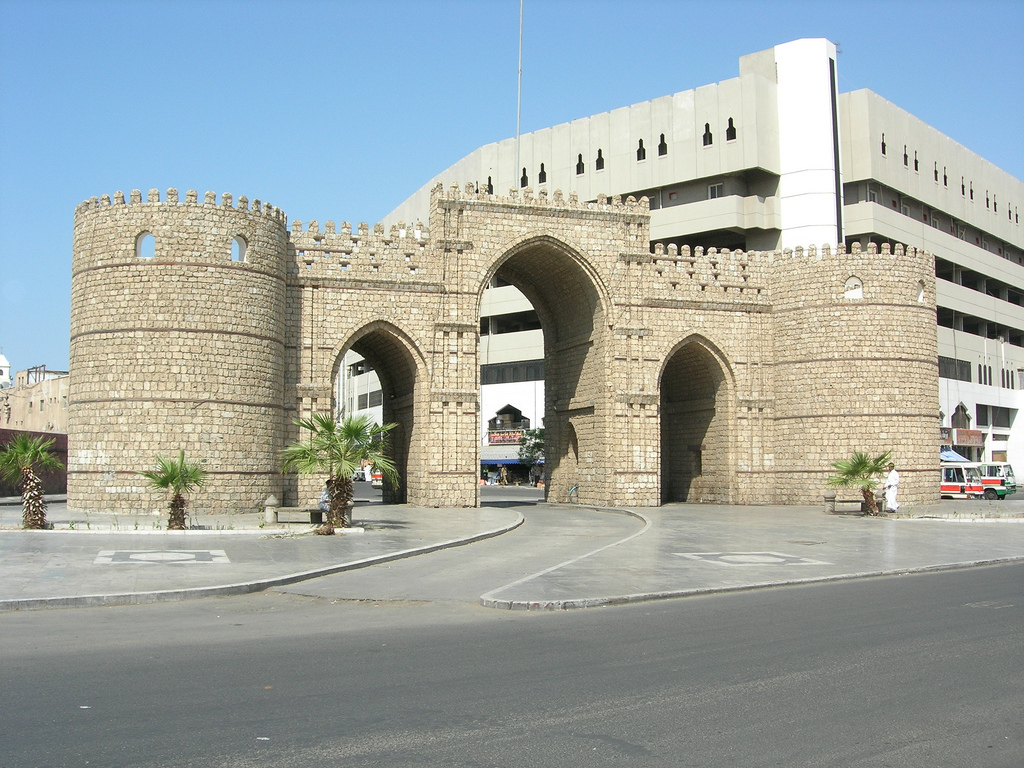
Bab Makkah

=== Jeddah Waterfront ===
The new waterfront was inaugurated in November 2017, by Makkah Governor, Prince Khaled Al-Faisal.

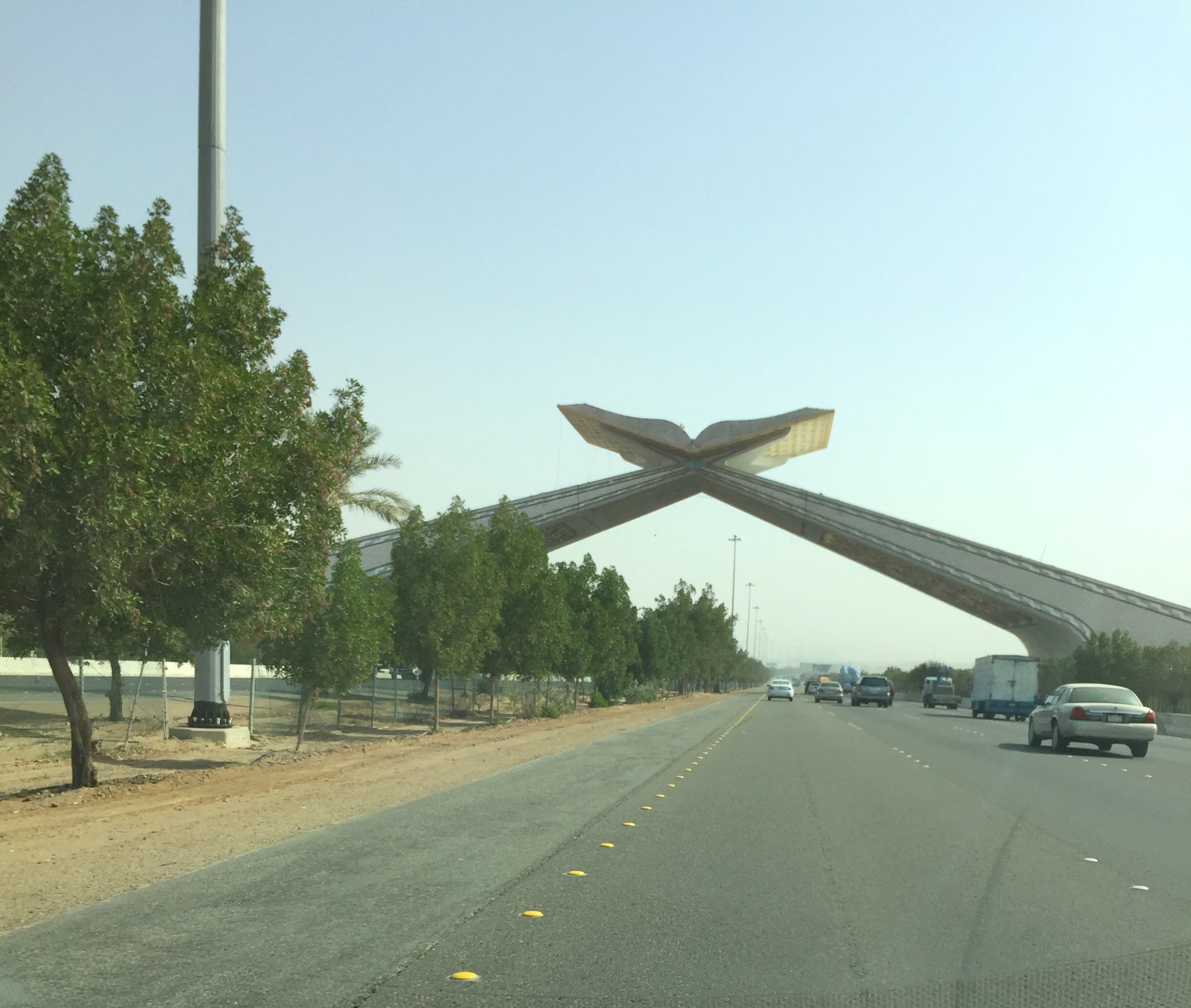
Quran Gate, Entrance to Makkah, Makkah Gate

It spans an area of 30 square kilometers (12 sq mi) on the Red Sea, and has many facilities, including swimming beaches, huts, a floating marina dock, washrooms, restaurants, parks, dancing fountains, playgrounds, and access to Wi-fi.

This project of developing the Jeddah Waterfront has been awarded the Jeddah Innovation Award of the year 1439 in the field of government innovation, by the Jeddah Governorate.

== Education ==
=== Schools, colleges and universities ===
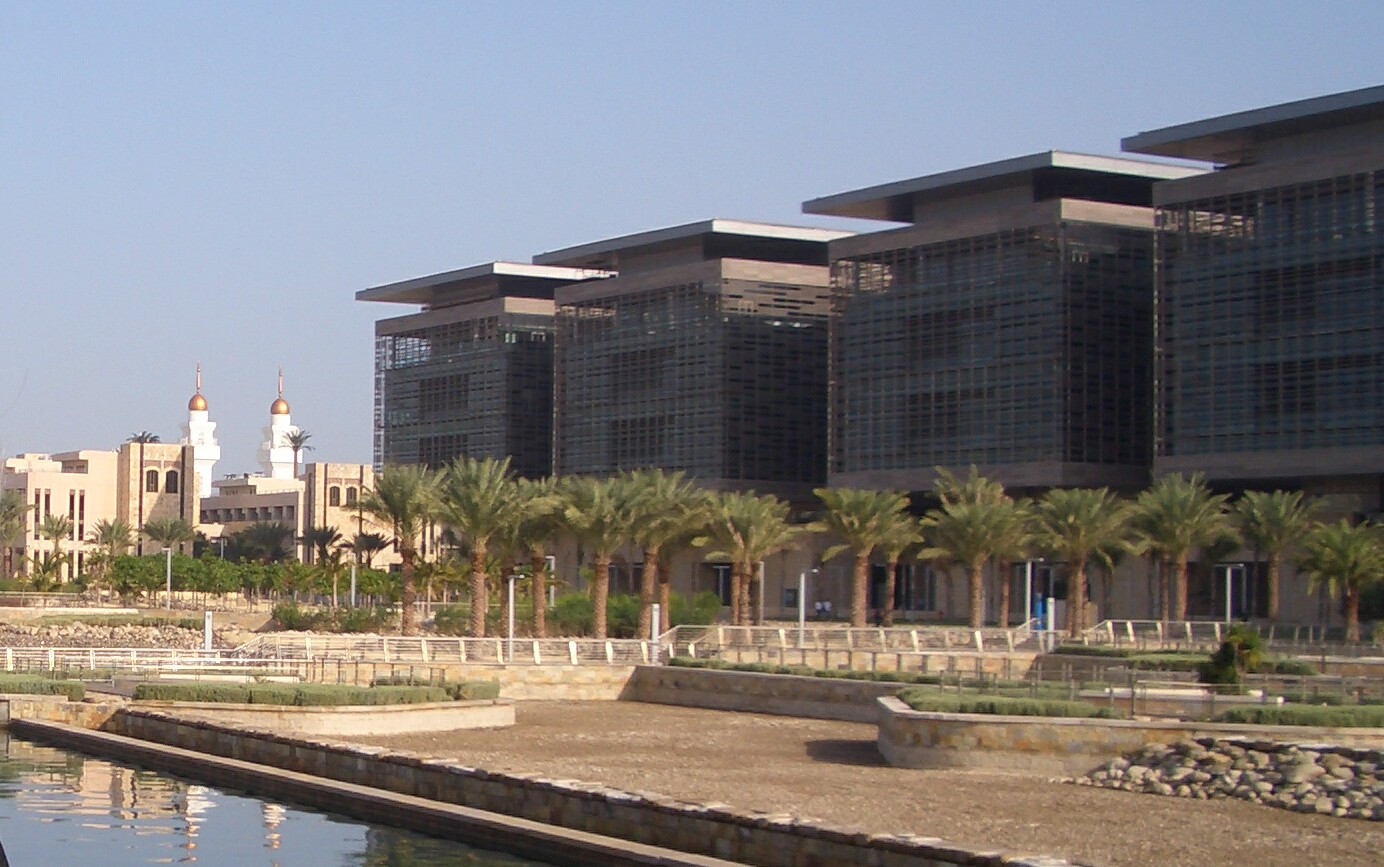
Laboratories at King Abdullah University of Science and Technology (KAUST)

As of 2005, Jeddah had 849 public and private schools for male students and another 1,179 public and private schools for female students. The medium of instruction in both public and private schools is typically Arabic, with an emphasis on English as a second language. However, some private schools administered by foreign entities conduct classes in English. These include 10+ Indian schools following the CBSE board of education system, and several Pakistani and Bangladeshi schools as well. As of 2005, Jeddah also had four Philippine international schools, with two more scheduled to open shortly afterward.

Jeddah's universities and colleges include the following:

- King Saud bin Abdulaziz University for Health Sciences
- King Abdulaziz University
- King Abdullah University of Science and Technology
- University of Jeddah
- Arab Open University
- Dar Al-Hekma College
- Effat University
- University of Business and Technology (UBT)
- Teacher's College
- Jeddah College of Technology
- Jeddah Private College
- College of Health Care
- College of Telecom & Electronics
- College of Community
- Private College of Business
- Ibn Sina National College for Medical Studies
- Batterjee Medical College
- Prince Sultan College of Tourism
- Prince Sultan Aviation Academy
- Islamic Fiqh Academy
- Jeddah Institute for Speech and Hearing
- Saudi German Institute for Nursing

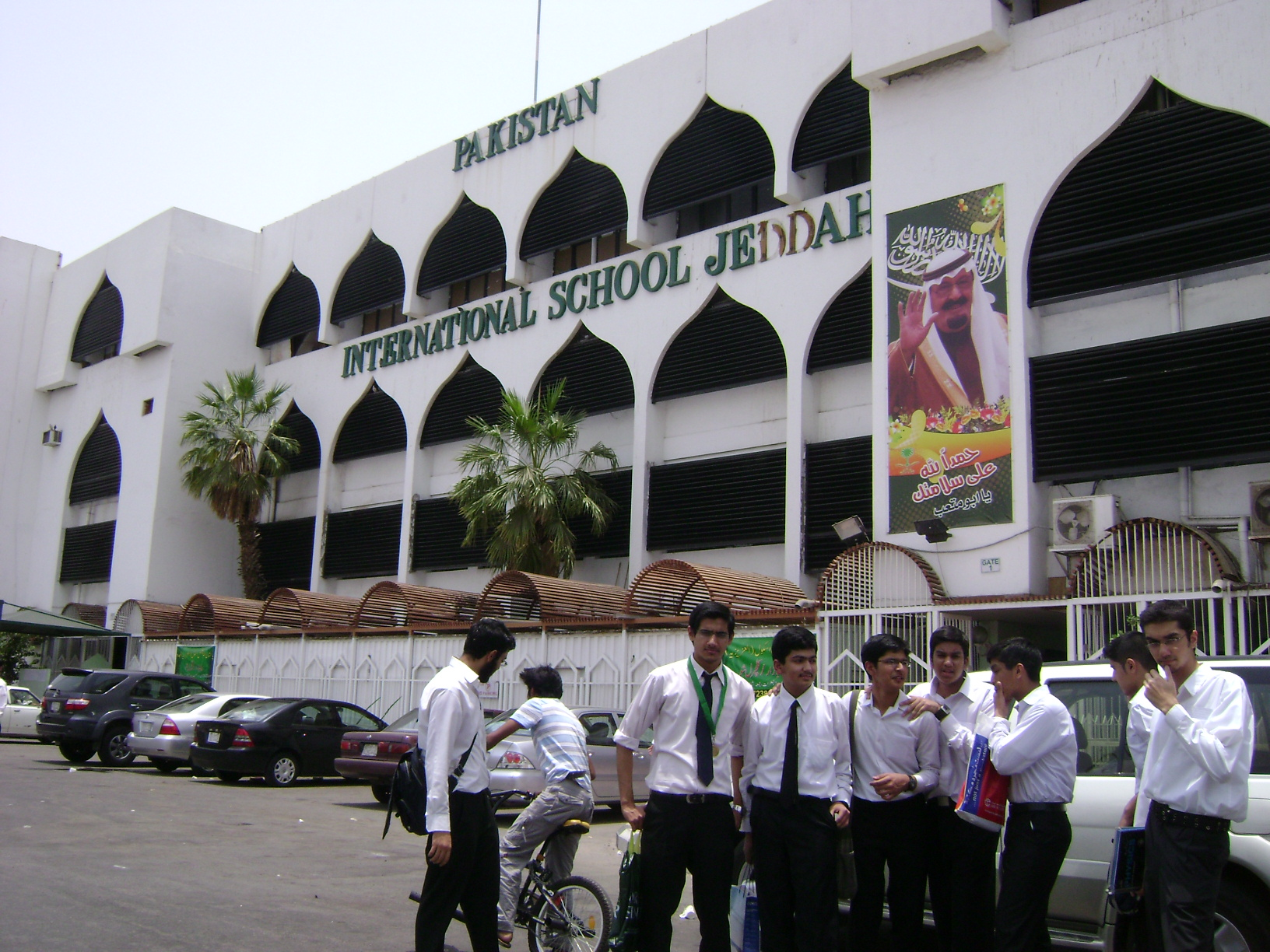
Pakistan International School Jeddah (PISJ)

Jeddah is also home to several primary, intermediate and secondary schools such as:

- Jeddah Knowledge International School
- American International School of Jeddah
- Italian international school
- Jeddah International School
- Zahrat Al-Sahraa International school (ZSIS)
- British International School of Jeddah (Continental, BISJ)
- German International School Jeddah
- Al-Thager Model School
- International Indian School Jeddah (IISJ)
- Pakistan International School Jeddah (PISJ)
- Talal International School Jeddah (TISJ)
- DPS Jeddah Al-Falah International School
- Knights Of Knowledge International Schools (KKIS)
- International Philippine School in Jeddah
- Jeddah Japanese School
- Korean International School of Jeddah (KISJ; 젯다한국국제학교)
- Al-Waha International School
- Beladi International School Jeddah
- Al-Afaq International School
- Manarat Jeddah Schools
- Gharnatah International School
- New Al Wurood International School Jeddah [NAWIS]
- Bangladesh International School Jeddah (BISESJ)
- Bader International School
- Arab international school
- Nobles International School (NIS)
- Dauha Al Uloom International School (DAUISJ)
- Al-Fath Schools
- Al-Aqsa Private Schools
- Dar Al-Fikr Schools (DAF)
- Al-Fanar School Jeddah
- Dar Al-Thikr Schools
- Hala International School (HIS)
- Jeddah International Turkish School (JITS)
- Jeddah Prep and Grammar School (JPGS)
- Al Hamraa Girls' School
- Building Blocks (private school)
- Dar Jana International School (DJIS)
- Al Mawarid International School Jeddah [AMIS]
- Pioneer International School
- Duaa International School Jeddah (DISJ)
- Jeddah Private School (JPS)
- Nhaond School
- Number 18 High School
- Number 25 Secondary School
- Tuletelah High School
- Bangladesh International School And College (Bangla Section) Jeddah (BISCJ)
- Al-Afkar International School
- Waad Academy School
- Al Kon International School

=== Libraries ===
The central library at King Abdulaziz University (main branch) is a five-story building that has a large collection of Arabic and English language books, rare books, and documents as well as access to several online databases. It is open for public access and allows the borrowing of books after requesting a library card. Saturdays are dedicated to female visitors.

King Abdul Aziz Public Library is a philanthropic institution that was founded and supported by the Custodian of the Two Holy Mosques King Abdullah Bin Abdulaziz, chairman of its board of directors. Established in 1985, the library was officially opened by the King on 27 February 1987. It emphasizes Islamic and Arabic heritage and history of the Kingdom. The library is divided into three branches (men's, women's, and children's).

The limited number of libraries is criticized by the public. As a result, King Abdullah, Custodian of the Two Holy Mosques, has approved the King Abdullah Project for the Development of Public Libraries, and approximately SAR150 million is budgeted to be spent.

In April 2014, Prince Mishaal Ibn Abdullah Abdulaziz opened a new public library in Jeddah by Makkah Governor, under the name of King Fahd Public Library.

King Fahd Public Library was built over an area of 17,000 square meters (180,000 sq ft) within the main Campus of King Abdulaziz University (KAU) in Jeddah. It includes a diverse collection of books and reference material classified into three sections to meet the needs and wants of a wide range of readership. Spaces have been set apart for youths, children and women.

== Sports ==
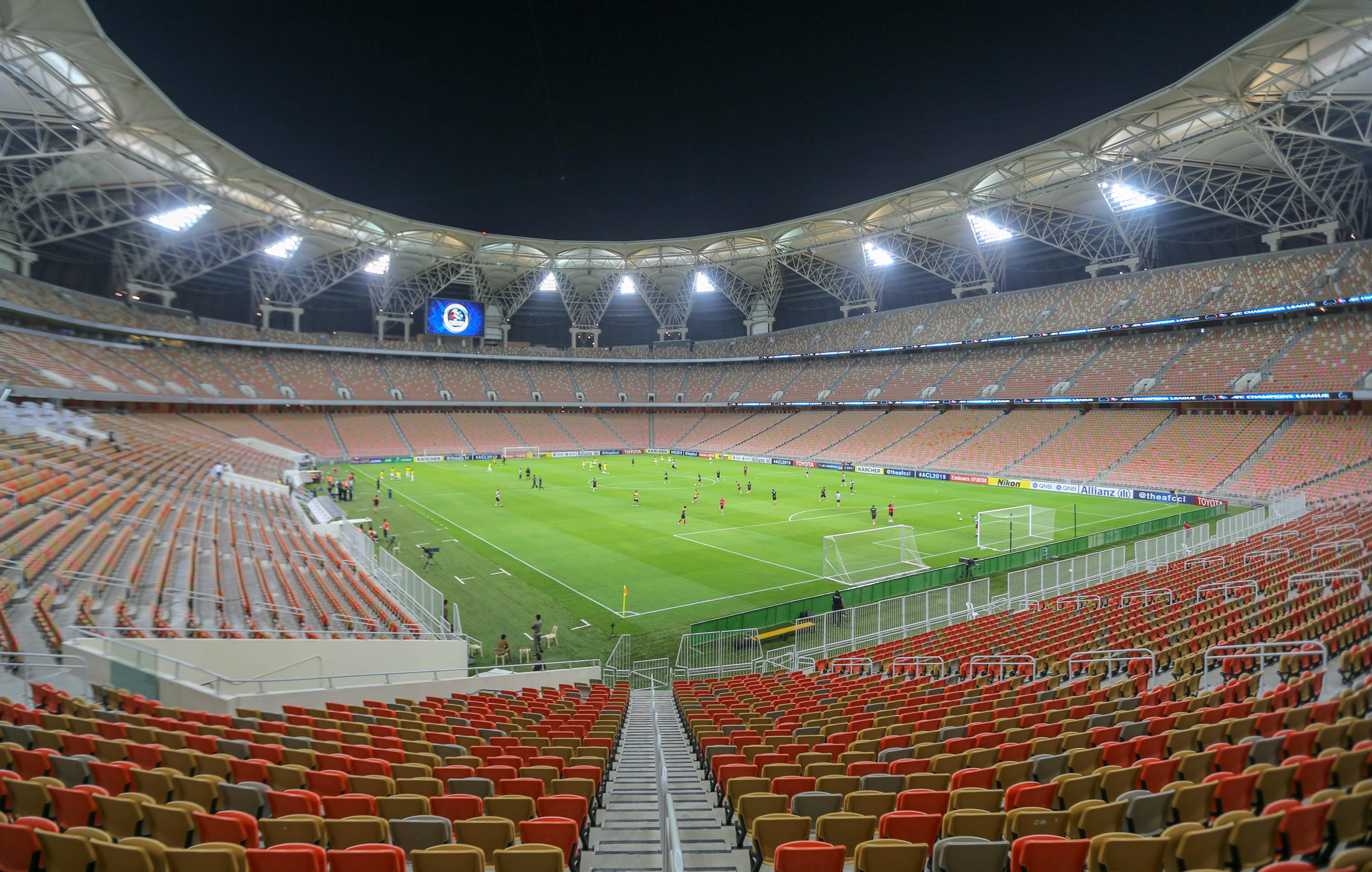
King Abdullah Sports City Stadium

=== Football ===
Jeddah is home to two of Saudi Arabia's "Big Four" football clubs, Al-Ittihad and Al-Ahli, both of which have among the largest fanbases in the country.

=== Formula One ===
Jeddah hosts the Saudi Arabian Grand Prix of the Formula One World Championship. The race is held at the Jeddah Corniche Circuit, a street circuit located along the Jeddah Corniche on the Red Sea coast.

=== Cricket ===
Cricket is played in Jeddah, particularly among the city's expatriate communities. The Saudi Arabian Cricket Federation and the Pakistan Cricket Board have discussed the development of cricket infrastructure in the city, including plans for a cricket stadium, with the aim of increasing participation in the sport among Saudi nationals and residents.

== Transportation ==
=== Airport ===
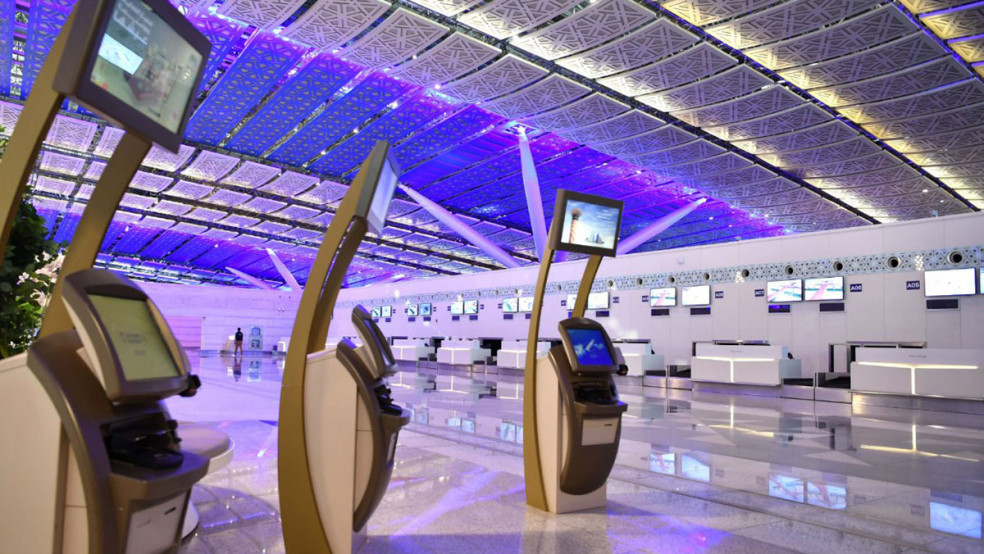
King Abdulaziz International Airport

Jeddah is served by King Abdulaziz International Airport, the main international gateway to the city and a major hub for pilgrims traveling to Mecca during the Hajj and Umrah seasons. The airport has four passenger terminals, including the Hajj Terminal, which is specifically designed to handle large numbers of pilgrims.

=== Seaport ===
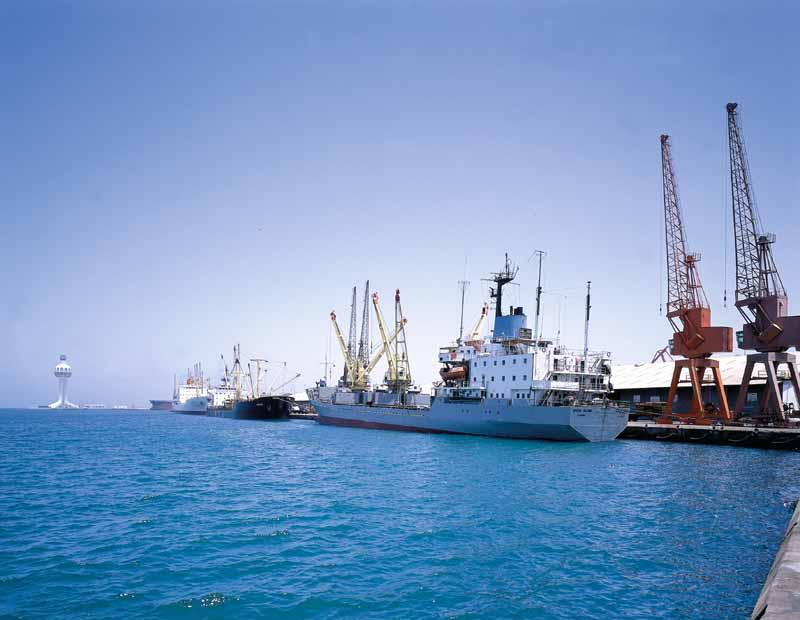
Jeddah Islamic Port

Jeddah Islamic Port is Saudi Arabia's principal Red Sea port and one of the country's main gateways for maritime trade. It handles a significant share of Saudi Arabia's container traffic and is an important commercial link between the kingdom and international markets.

=== Road and rail ===
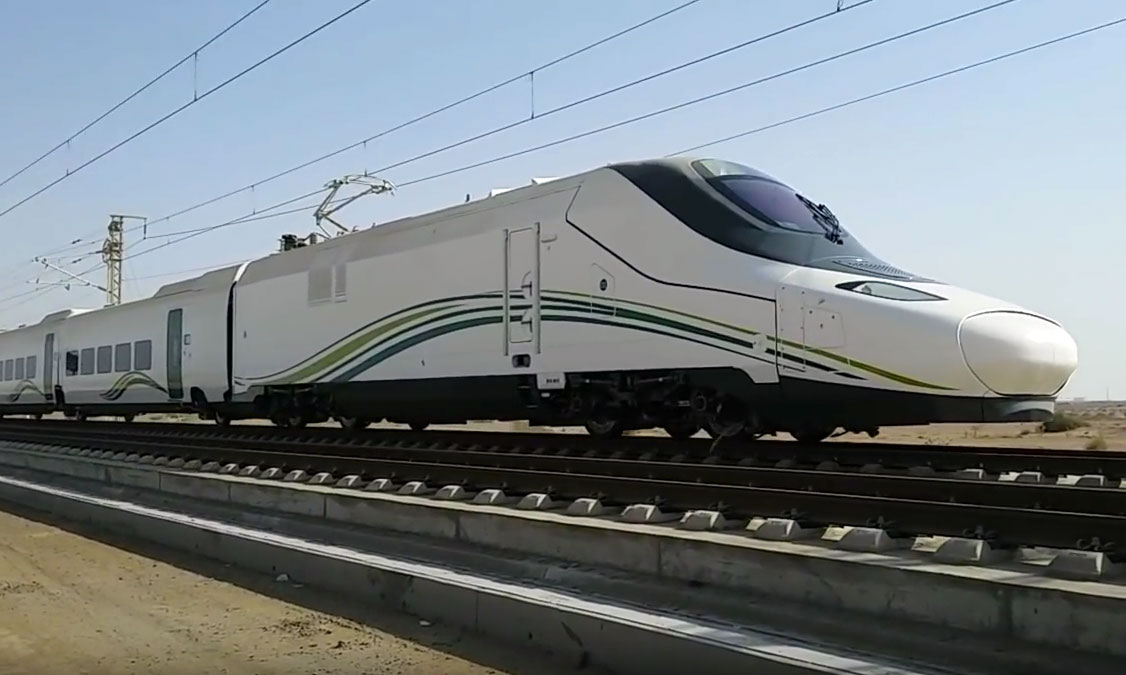
A Renfe Class 102 train operating on the Haramain High Speed Railway

Jeddah is connected by Highway 40 to Mecca, Riyadh, and Dammam. The Haramain High Speed Railway connects Jeddah with Mecca and Medina, with Jeddah station located near the airport. A Jeddah Metro has also been proposed as part of plans to develop public transportation in the city.

== Issues and challenges ==
The city is challenged by pollution, weak sewage systems, and a weak storm drain system that has led to massive flooding, heavy traffic, epidemics, and water shortages.

=== Pollution and environment ===
Air pollution is a problem for Jeddah, particularly on hot summer days. The city has experienced bush fires, landfill fires, and pollution from the two industrial zones in the north and the south of the metropolitan area. A water treatment factory and the seaport also contribute to water pollution. Much of the seafront, however, is considered to be safe and clean. Ramboll has acted as Environmental Consultant on the Jeddah Environmental Impact Assessment as well as the Jeddah Environmental Social Masterplan.

=== Terrorism ===
At midday on 6 December 2004, militants loyal to the regional affiliate of the terrorist group Al-Qaeda launched an attack on the U.S. Consulate, killing five employees. The group was led by Fayez ibn Awwad Al-Jeheni, a former member of the religious police. Two of the other assailants were subsequently identified by Saudi authorities as residents of Jeddah's Al-Jamia suburb and other slum areas on Saudi Arabia's increasingly urbanized west coast. Buildings were attacked, hostages were taken and used as human shields, targeting both Americans and non-Americans alike. Despite a protracted siege, the chancery/consular section of the building was never penetrated. Closed-circuit video feeds documented that Saudi security personnel assigned to protect the facility fled when the vehicle carrying the terrorists pulled up to the front gate and passed the Delta barrier. Inside the compound, however, an armed Saudi security guard employed by the embassy shot and killed one of the five terrorists before being fatally shot himself.

The attackers spread and ignited a flammable liquid on the front of the chancery building, and opened fire on the front doors, both of which actions did not have any penetrating effect. The Consulate's U.S. Marines released tear gas in front of the chancery building, but the terrorists had already left that location. More than an hour later, Saudi special forces made it through traffic and, along with others from their unit who arrived in a helicopter, fought to retake the compound. In the final shootout, two of the terrorists were killed, with another dying later in hospital, and one militant was captured alive. Four Saudi special forces and a further ten hostages were wounded in the crossfire.

The five U.S. Foreign Service employees killed in the terrorist attack were Ali Yaslem Bin Talib, Imad e-Deen Musa Ali, Romeo de la Rosa, Mohammed Baheer Uddin, and Jaufar Sadik, nationals of Yemen, Sudan, Philippines, India and Sri Lanka, respectively.

The attack underscored the ongoing vulnerabilities of Westerners to threats, terrorist actions, and the environs. In a communiqué posted in online publications such as Sawt al-Jihad (Voice of Jihad) and Mu'askar al-Battar (Al-Battar Training Camp), Al-Qaeda hinted at the symbolic nature of the U.S. Consulate attack, stating: "Know that the Mujahideen are determined to continue on their path, and they will not be weakened by what has happened to them."

Terrorist activities have persisted from 2004 to the present day. In 2004, there was an unsuccessful shooting attack on a U.S. Marine visiting the Saudi American Bank and an attempt to simultaneously explode car bombs at Saudi American Bank and Saudi British Bank branches in Jeddah on the anniversary of the 2001 "9-11" terrorist attacks on the U.S. On 26 August 2012, a spokesman for the Interior Ministry announced that terrorists were arrested in Jeddah who had been preparing explosives for attacks within the kingdom.

In 2022, the Houthis launched a missile attack against an Aramco facility near the Jeddah Corniche Circuit, where the Formula One Saudi Arabian Grand Prix was held.

=== Traffic ===
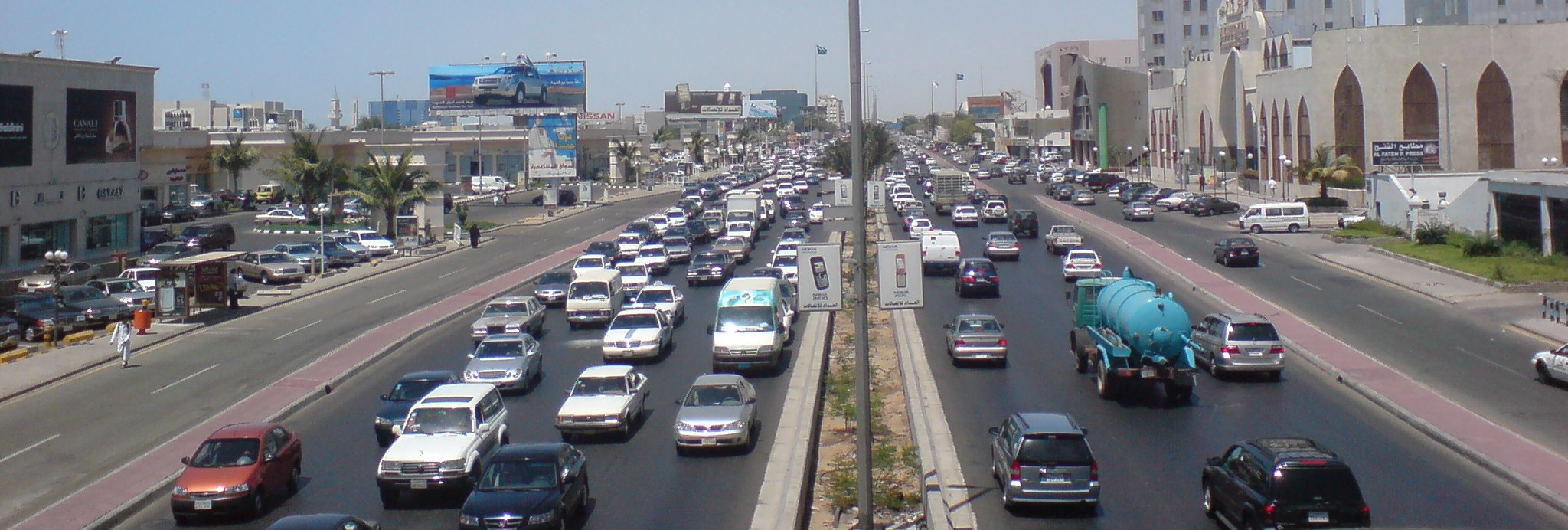
Traffic on Medina Road in Jeddah

Roads and highways within and exiting the city are frequently clogged with traffic. Mass transit is rare and planning is nascent; most Jeddawi adults have at least one car. Days immediately preceding and following the holy days are particularly noisome and cost hundreds of thousands of person-hours because of traffic jams.

The Saudi Gazette reports that there is a plan in the works to tackle the traffic issue. A reported three billion Saudi Riyals will be put into constructing flyovers and underpasses in an effort to expedite traffic. The plan is scheduled to take about five years from its start to finish.

=== Sewage ===
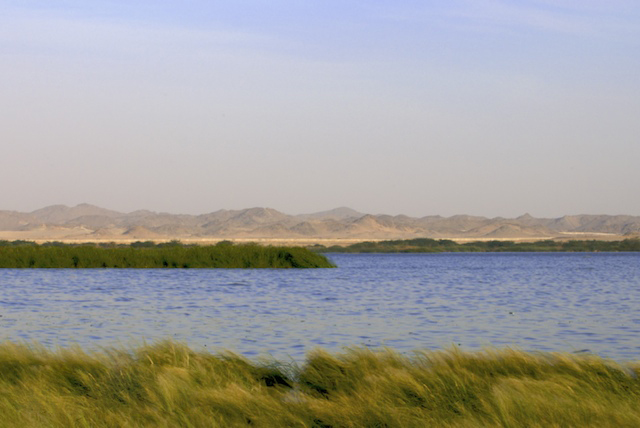
Al-Musk Lake, located east of the city, is a sewage lake serving Jeddah.

Prior to the construction of a waste treatment plant, Jeddah's wastewater was disposed of by either discharge into the sea or via absorption into deep underground pits. However, even with the ever-increasing population, the original sewer system has hardly been expanded. The original plant cannot cope with the amount of waste inundating it daily. As a result, some untreated sewage is discharged directly into the sea and the entire northern part of the city remains completely unconnected to the sewage system, instead relying on septic tanks. This has been responsible for a large number of sewage tankers.

In late 2011, a storm drainage system was built in the south Jeddah area (similar to that of the Los Angeles storm drain) to reduce the risk of floods.

=== Floods ===
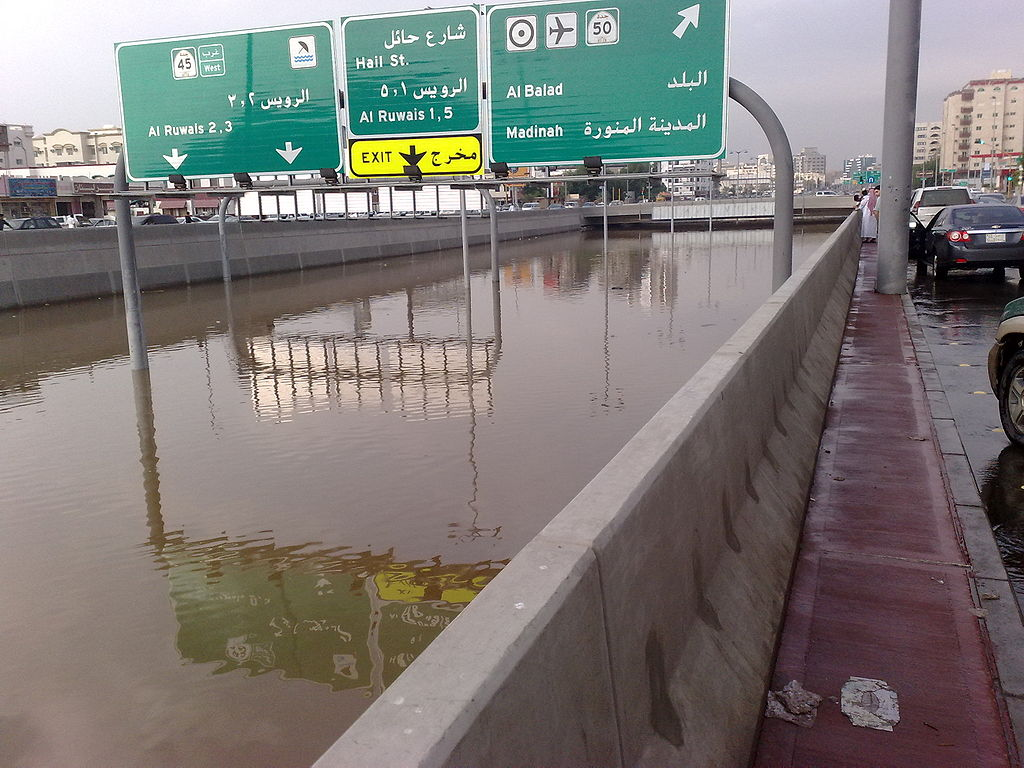
A tunnel in King Abdullah St. was filled with water during the 2009 floods.

On 25 November 2009, heavy floods affected the city and other areas of Makkah Province. The floods were described by civil defence officials as the worst in 27 years. As of 26 November 2009, 77 people were reported to have been killed, and more than 350 were missing. Some roads were under a meter (three feet) of water on 26 November, and many of the victims were believed to have drowned in their cars. At least 3,000 vehicles were swept away or damaged. The death toll was expected to rise as flood waters receded, allowing rescuers to reach stranded vehicles.

On 26 January 2011, again, heavy floods affected the city and other areas of Makkah Province. The cumulative rainfall exceeded the 90 mm (3.5 in) recorded in four hours during the 25 November 2009 flash floods. Streets including Palestine Street, Madinah Road, and Wali Al-Ahad Street were either flooded or jammed with traffic. Cars were seen floating in some places. Meanwhile, eyewitnesses told local newspaper Arab News that East Jeddah was swamped and floodwater was rushing west towards the Red Sea, turning streets into rivers once again.

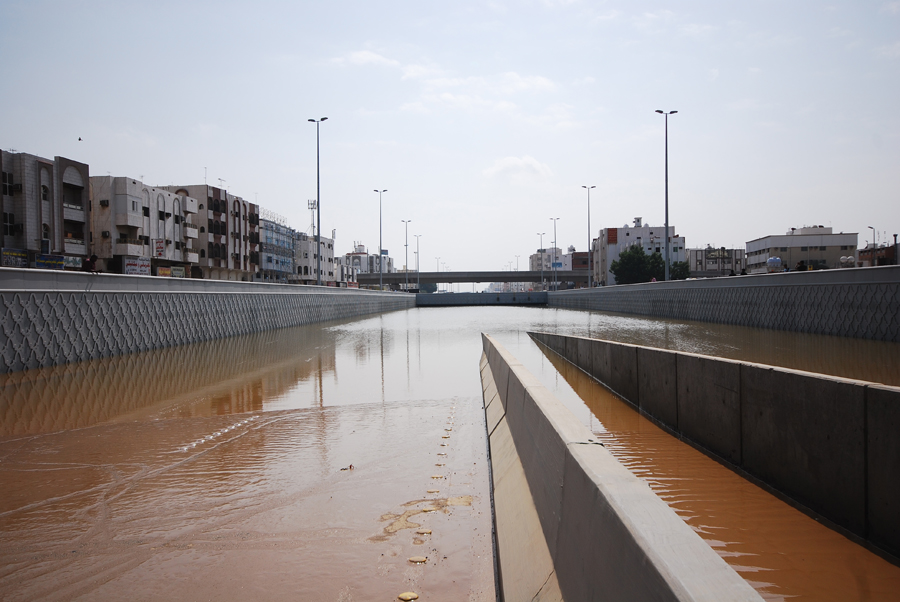
A tunnel in King Abdullah St. was filled with water during the 2011 floods.

On 17 November 2015, heavy floods affected the city. Streets affected by the flood include Palestine Street, Madinah Road, and many others. Cars were seen burning, and many trees fell as a result of the violent flood. Three deaths were also reported. Two of the fatalities (including a child) were hit by lightning while crossing a street.

On 21 November 2017, heavy floods affected the city once more and Jeddah Islamic Port stopped operations for about three hours. Jeddah police received 11,000 phone calls on 911 from people enquiring about alternative roads and weather conditions. There were 250 reports of electrocution. Five people were electrocuted, two died.

On 24 November 2022, heavy floods affected Jeddah. Jeddah was heavily damaged from the flood and caused more than thousands of cars to be damaged by the flood and caused power outages to most of the city and the flood was approximately 1-2 meters high. As a result, flights were delayed, schools were closed, and two people were killed.

== See also ==
- Provinces of Saudi Arabia
- List of governorates of Saudi Arabia
- List of cities and towns in Saudi Arabia
- List of World Heritage Sites in Saudi Arabia

== General and cited sources ==
- Didier, Charles. Séjour Chez Le Grand-Cherif De La Mekke. Librairie De L. Hachette et, Rue Pierre.
- Didier, Charles. Rehla Ela Al-Hejaz: A Trip to Hejaz. Translated from Séjour Chez Le Grand-Cherif De La Mekke into Arabic. Paris, 1854. ISBN 9960-677-14-1.
- Facey, William & Grant, Gillian. Saudi Arabia by the First Photographers. ISBN 0-905743-74-1
- Farsi, Hani M.S. (Mohamed Said). Jeddah: city of art: the sculptures and monuments. London: Stacey International, 1991. ISBN 0-905743-66-0.
- From Bullard to Mr Chamberlain. Jeddah, 1925 Feb. (No.# secrets) - Archived Post.
- Froster, Captain G. S. A trip Across the Peninsula - Rehla Abr Al-Jazeera. Mombai, India, 1866.
- El-Hage, Badr. Saudi Arabia: caught in time 1861-1939. Published by Garnet, Reading, 1997. ISBN 1-85964-090-7.
- Al-Harbi, Dalal. King Abdulaziz and his Strategies to deal with events: Events of Jeddah. King Abdulaziz National Library, 2003. ISBN 9960-624-88-9.
- Keane, John F. Six months in the Hejaz: journeys to Makkah and Madinah 1877-1989. Manchester: Barzan Publishing, 2006. ISBN 0-9549701-1-X.
- Al-Khaldi, Ibrahim. The Bedouin Photographer - Al-Mosawwir Al-Badawi. Kuwait, 2004.
- Maneval, Stefan. 2019. New Islamic Urbanism: The Architecture of Public and Private Space in Jeddah, Saudi Arabia Archived 16 January 2020 at the Wayback Machine. London: UCL Press. ISBN 9781787356429.
- Al-Rehani. Nejd and Its Followers.
- Tarabulsi, Mohammed Yosuf. Jeddah: A Story of a City. Riyadh: King Fahd National Library, 2006. ISBN 9960-52-413-2.
- Al-Turki, Thuraya. Jeddah: Um Al-Rakha wal Sheddah. Published by Dar Al-Shrooq.
