= List of Saudi poets =

This is a list of poets from the Western Asian country of Saudi Arabia.

== A ==
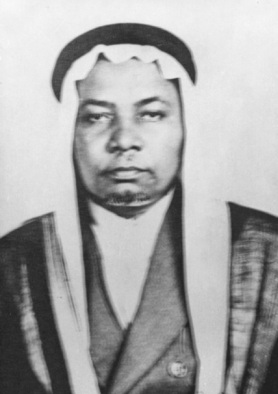
Mahmud Arif

- Muhammad al Ali (born 1932)
- Mohammed Alrotayyan
- Muhammad Said Al Amudi (1905–1991)
- Abd al-Quddus al-Ansari (1907–1983)
- Mahmud Arif (1909–2001)
- Ahmad Abd al-Ghafur Attar (1916–1991)

== F ==
- Muhammed Hasan Faqi (1912–2004)
- Ashraf Fayadh (born 1980)

== G ==
- Naif Gahani (born 1968)
- Ghazi Abdul Rahman Al Gosaibi (1940–2010)

== H ==
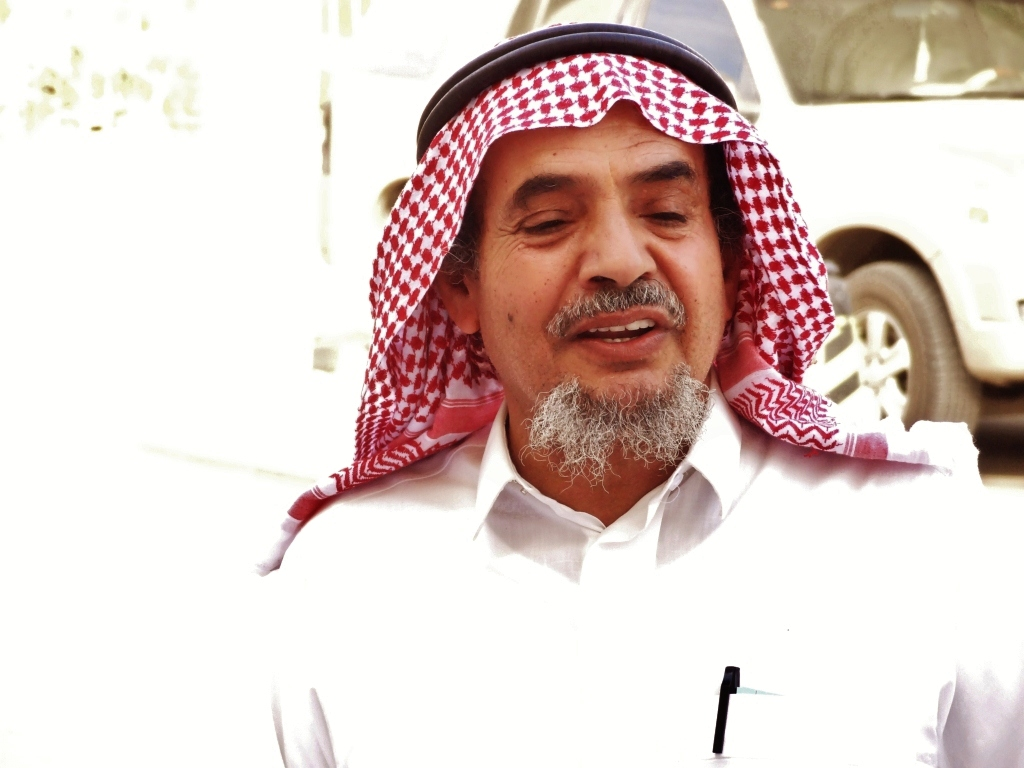
Abdullah al-Hamid

- Hamad al-Hajji (1939–1988)
- Abdullah al-Hamid (1950–2020)
- Saad Al-Hamidin (born 1947)
- Abdul Aziz al-Harbi (born 1965)
- Mohammed Al Herz (born 1967)
- Hissa Hilal
- Ahmad al-Hilali (born 1974)
- Ibrahim Al-Hsawi (born 1964)

== I ==
- Abdullah bin Idris (1929–2021)

== J ==
- Raed Al-Jishi, translator (born 1976)

== K ==
- Hamza Kashgari (born 1989)
- Fawziyya Abu Khalid (born 1955)

== M ==
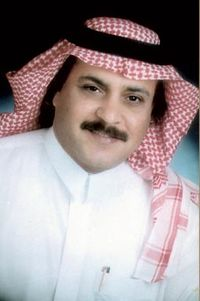
Abdel Mohsin Musellem

- Belques Melhem (born 1977)
- Ahmad al-Muhsini (1744–1831)
- Abdel Mohsin Musellem (born 1958)
- Hind al-Mutayri

== N ==
- Nimah Ismail Nawwab
- Hisham Nazer (1952–2015)

== O ==
- Mutlaq Hamid Al-Otaibi (1937–1995)

== Q ==
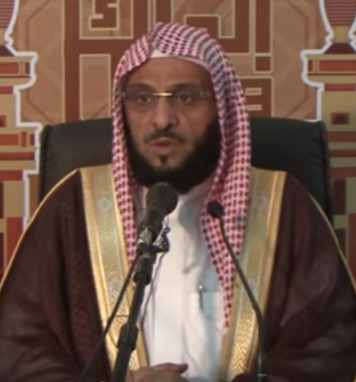
Aid al-Qarni

- Thuraya Qabil (born 1943)
- Aid al-Qarni (born 1959)
- Ahmad Qandil (1911–1979)
- Hasan Abdullah Al-Qurashi (1930–2004)

== R ==
- Abdullah bin Ali Al Rashid (1788–1848), Nabati poet
- Nawwaf bin Talal Al Rashid (born 1989)
- Musaid al-Rashidi, nabataean poet (1962–2017)

== S ==
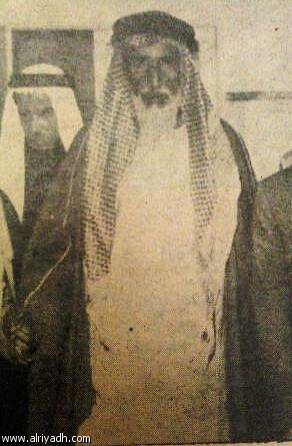
Saud Al Kabeer bin Abdulaziz Al Saud

- Mohammed Suroor Sabban (1898–1972)
- Nayef bin Abdulaziz (1934–2012)
- Abdul Muhsin bin Abdulaziz Al Saud (1925–1985)
- Abdullah bin Faisal Al Saud (1923–2007)
- Badr bin Abdul Mohsen Al Saud (1949–2024)
- Mishari bin Abdulaziz Al Saud (1932–2000)
- Mohammed bin Abdullah Al Saud (1943–2011)
- Saud Al Kabeer bin Abdulaziz Al Saud (1882–1959)
- Husain Sirhan (1916–1993)
- Nuri bin Hazaa Al Shalaan (1847–1942)
- Abdulrahman Adel Al-Shammari (born 1974)
- Turki Al-Sheikh (born 1981)
- Hamza Shehata (1911–1972)

== T ==
- Abdullah Thabit (born 1973)

== Z ==
- Abu Abd al-Rahman Ibn Aqil al-Zahiri (born 1938)
- Abu Turab al-Zahiri (1923–2002)
- Abd al-Wahhab Abu Zayd (born 1970)
