= List of Saudi Arabian writers =

This is a list of Saudi Arabian writers, including novelists, short story writers, poets, journalists, bloggers, etc.

- Ali al-Ahmed
- Maqbul Moussa al-Alawi
- Raja'a Alem
- Ghazi Abdul Rahman Algosaibi
- Hadeel Alhodaif
- Mansour Alnogaidan
- Mohammed Hasan Alwan
- Yahya Amqassim
- Raif Badawi
- Abdullah Bin Bakheet
- Hamza Muhammad Bogary
- Weam Al Dakheel, journalist, television presenter
- Reem al Faisal
- Turki al-Hamad
- Ibrahim Al-Hsawi
- Zuhair Kutbi
- Laila al-Juhani (1969-)
- Abdo Khal (1962-)
- Fawziyya Abu Khalid
- Umaima al-Khamis (1966-)
- Samira Khashoggi
- Yousef Al-Mohaimeed
- Abdul Rahman Munif
- Eman al-Nafjan
- Nimah Ismail Nawwab
- Laila al-Ohaidib
- Mutlaq Hamid Al-Otaibi
- Thuraya Qabil writer and poet (1943 - )
- Nourah Al-Qahtani
- Aaidh ibn Abdullah al-Qarni
- Huda al-Rasheed, broadcaster, short story writer and novelist
- Mohammed Suroor Sabban
- Rajaa al-Sanea
- Rashid Al Shamrani
- Hamza Shihata (1910–71)
- Abdullah Thabit
- Siba'i Uthman
- Mai Yamani
