= Museums in Saudi Arabia =

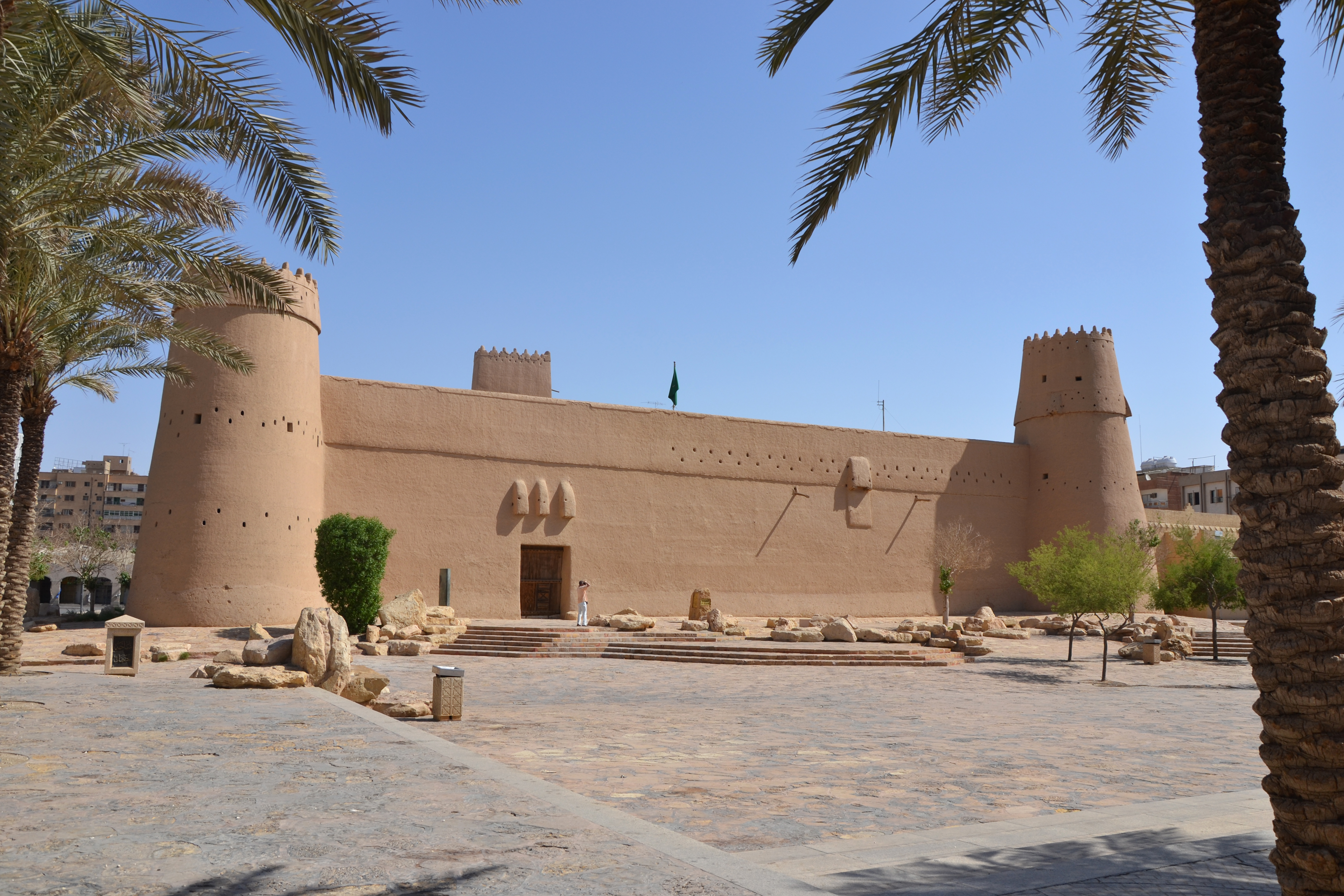

Museum culture within Saudi Arabia can be traced back to 1945, when the Kingdom participated in the founding of the United Nations Educational Scientific, and Cultural Organisation (UNESCO) and signed the Cultural Treaty of the Arab League which emphasizes, in Article 10, the need to focus on the field of antiquities in the Arab world. Plans for museums began at the first archaeological conferences held by the Arab League Educational, Cultural, and Scientific Organisation (ALESCO).

Community initiatives in the field, however, date back to the early twentieth century, when Muhammad Salih Ba‘ishen founded the first private museum inside his home in Jeddah in 1902. He collected artifacts from Jeddah as well as from a range of Arab and Asian countries. Decades later, Saudi public museums were established for preservation and education purposes and have long been associated with heritage and archaeology. The Law of Antiquities, Museums, and Urban Heritage, established by Royal Decree in 2014, defines a museum as "a place where archaeological, artistic, [cultural, historical, or scientific items are permanently exhibited for cultural, educational, or recreational purposes, and which is open to the public at specific times".

== First Saudi museum ==
The first Saudi public museum, the Jeddah Museum of Artifacts (al-‘adiyyat), was established in the 1960s before the field of museums and antiquities were given governmental support and instead served the purpose of preserving artifacts for research. The Museum occupied a large hall in the Technical Affairs Building for Mineral Resources, which later became affiliated with what is now the Ministry of Energy. The Museum primarily contained books, ancient Islamic stone inscriptions, ceramic vessels, and coins and when it was visited by Abdulquddus Al-Ansari in 1961, he described its holdings in his book Between Antiquities and Heritage.

== History of museums in Saudi Arabia ==
1964 marked the beginning of the official investment in museums after the establishment of an Antiquities Department, linked to the Ministry of Education in part due to the ministry's presence across all regions and the links between education and historical heritage. The department began its work in one of the halls of the Model Capital Institute in Riyadh and has worked since its inception to establish museums throughout the Kingdom's regions.

In 1972 a royal decree was issued forming the Supreme Council of Antiquities (SCA) and approving the Law of Antiquities, which at that time provided regulations only for artifacts, not for museums. This law remained in effect for nearly 45 years until it was replaced by the Law of Antiquities, Museums, and Urban Heritage.

The National Museum of Antiquities and Folklore was opened in 1978, housing many collections that were assembled after the Comprehensive Archaeological Survey of 1976 and subsequent excavations. Years later, its collection would become the foundation of the National Museum of Saudi Arabia.

The 1970s were marked by many geographical, historical, and literary studies that focused on the subject of museums and artefacts. A number of explorers, surveyors and historians including Abdulquddus Al-Ansari, Hamad Al-Jassir, Muhammad Al-Aqili, and Atiq Al-Biladi, published books and articles in the field.

== The role of universities in the museum sector ==
In 1966 universities began to play a key role in museums with The Department of Arabic in the College of Arts at King Saud University, then known as Riyadh University, opening a museum that collected artifacts of traditional Saudi heritage to preserve them from accelerating lifestyle changes in the Arabian Peninsula at that time. The following year, the university opened the Museum of Antiquities as a part of the History and Archaeology Society under the auspices of the Department of History in the College of Arts. After the Society was founded, an archaeological division was added to the Department of History which aimed to produce qualified Saudi graduates in the field. In 1978 it became the first department of antiquities and museums in the Kingdom, and it was the sole department devoted to antiquities until the Departments of Tourism and Archaeology at Jazan University and the University of Hail were established in 2009.

== Foundation of the National Museum and the subsequent period ==
The National Museum was opened in Riyadh in 1999 and was stylized in line with the architectural style of buildings located at the King Abdulaziz Historical Centre.

The Agency of Antiquities and Museums opened the Al-Namas Museum (also known as Palace of Al-Namas) in 2000 and a year later, the Al-Qunfudhah City Museum of Archaeology and Folklore opened which was the last museum founded under the auspices of the agency. Other governmental and private actors established specialized museums associated with their own field of activity, for example, the Ministry of Defense and Aviation (now the Ministry of Defense) inaugurated its first museum, the Saqr Al-Jazira Aviation Museum in Riyadh, during the centennial of King Abdulaziz's recapture of the city. The General Presidency for the Affairs of the Two Holy Mosques opened the Two Holy Mosques Architecture Exhibition in Makkah, as well as museums in archaeological, military, medical, and scientific faculties.

The Al-Bahah Museum, the Hail Museum, the Tabuk Regional Museum and the Heritage and Antiquities Museum in Unayzah's "Albassam Heritage House" were inaugurated in the years after.

In 2008 the General Commission for Tourism and Antiquities, as it was then called, began to steer the sector to support research, establish new museums, develop existing ones, and renovate a number of historic buildings for government use during the rule of King Abdulaziz. The Commission also invested in restoring some historic buildings in the governorates and turning them into museums.

Most museums in this period arose from plans to develop tourist sites with important architectural heritage. For example, after its 2009 renovation the Subaie Heritage House in Shaqra, made the city a tourist destination for groups of foreigners, citizens, and residents alike and in 2012, the Al-Ghat Museum opened after its building was renovated as part of the Heritage Village Development Project in the Ghat Governate. The Museum of the Shami Hajj Road in the Islamic Fortress in Al-Hijr (also known as Mada’in Salih) isalso a part of the Heritage Village Development Project, which was opened in Al-Ula Governorate. Lastly, in 2013, the Hijaz Railway Museum was opened in the locomotive workshop at the Hijaz Railway station in Al-Madinah.

== Number of museums established 2007–2018 ==
Museum Type	Number	Locations
Regional	1	Northern Border in 2007
Provincial Museums, Historical Museums	17	Al-Zulfi, Al-Duwadimi, Wadi Al-Duwasir, Duba, Al-Wajh, Shaqra, Shami Hajj Road in the Islamic Fortress in Al-Hijr, Hijaz Railway in the Locomotive Workshop in Al-Hijr, Al-Majmaah, Al-Badi’a, Al-Ghat, Tabuk Fortress, Hijaz Railway Station (Tabuk Station), Qurayyat, Al-Hofuf, Al-Ahsa, and the Khuzam Palace, which was turned into the Jeddah Regional Museum named after King Abdulaziz.
Open-air, outdoor	1	The Jeddah Sculpture Museum, an art museum featuring a number of sculptures that were part of the Jeddah landscape, active since the 1960s.
Virtual	1	Brochure: “The Virtual Museum of the Kingdom's Archaeological Masterpieces"
Specialized	6	Museum of Science and Technology in Islam at the King Abdullah University of Science and Technology in Thuwal, which has its own website; the Museum of Science and Technology in Islam at the Imam Muhammad bin Saud Islamic University in Riyadh; The Museum of Arab Islamic Art at the King Faisal Centre for Research and Islamic Studies in Riyadh; and the Ithra Museum and the Ithra Children’s Museum at the King Abdulaziz Centre for World Culture in Dhahran; the King Salman Science Oasis in the Municipality of Riyadh, one of eight interactive science and technology museums, called King Salman Science Oases.

== See also ==
- List of museums in Saudi Arabia
- Museums in Riyadh
- National Museum of Saudi Arabia
- Heritage in Saudi Arabia
