= Abd al-Quddus al-Ansari =

Saudi Arabian historian, journalist and writer

- عبد القدوس الأنصاري
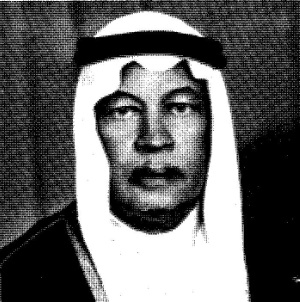
- Al-Ansari, 1960s
- Born: c. 12 February 1907; Medina, Hejaz vilayet, Ottoman Empire
- Died: 5 April 1983 (aged 76); Jedda, Saudi Arabia
- Resting place: Jannat al-Mu'alla
- Occupations: Historian; official; journalist; poet
- Writing career
- Language: Arabic
- Years active: 1928–1983
- Notable work: The Twins (1930)

Signature
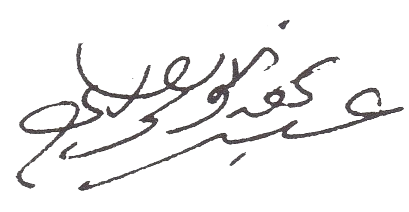

Abd al-Quddus al-Ansari (Arabic: عبد القدوس الأنصاري, romanized: ʿAbd al-Quddūs al-Anṣārī; c. 12 February 1907 – 5 April 1983) was a Saudi Arabian historian, journalist and writer, born and raised in Medina under Ottoman and Hashemite rule into a Khazraji family. Employed by local government just after graduation from a local madrasah in 1928, he held several official positions from 1928 to 1954. A self-taught historian and archaeologist, he was the author of works about the history of Medina and wrote about various topics of his region, the Hejaz. In 1937, he founded the monthly magazine “Al-Manhal” . He also wrote literary works like The Twins (1930), the first Hejazi-Saudi novel, but his many professional activities prevented him from writing more than one novel. He died at the age of 76 in Mecca due to an incurable disease and was buried in Al-Mu'alla Cemetery.

== Biography ==
=== Early years and education ===
His full name (nasab) was Abd al-Quddus bin al-Qasim bin Muhammad bin Muhammad al-Ansari al-Barami, and both his paternal and maternal ancestors belonged to the Banu Khazraj, also known as Al-Ansar. He was born and raised in Medina c. 12 February 1907 / 29 Dhul Hajjah 1324 under Ottoman rule. His father was a teacher at the Prophet's Mosque (Al-Masjid an-Nabawi). His mother, Aminah bint Muhammad bin Zain al-Ansari was from Timbuktu, died when he was about four years, and his father died when he was about six years. His maternal uncle, Muhammad al-Tayyib bin Issaq al-Ansari, became his legal guardian.

Al-Ansari studied in the Masjid al-Nabawi under a group of ulema, who were teaching in the mosque's courtyards, called "halaqat", similar to a Kuttab. Among his most prominent teachers was his maternal uncle. He learned his first lessons in Qiraʼat when he was seven years old, and completed Quran memorization after two more years. He studied various religious subjects at the mosque, and also learned calligraphy from one of the Ottoman Turkish calligraphers. When he reached the age of sixteen, he moved to the School of Sharia Sciences (Al-Madrasat ul-Ulum al-Shar'iyah) in Medina in 1922, when it was established by Ahmad Al-Fayd Abadi. His uncle, Muhammad al-Tayyib, was a supervisor and principal in that school. Al-Ansari obtained his graduation certificate in 1927. The head of the Divan of the Emirate of Medina in the Hejaz and Nejd Kingdom, Ismail Hifzi, attended the public examination that was held for the students. When Al-Ansari's success became evident to Ismail Hifzi, he invited him to join the Divan administration. After consulting his uncle, Al-Ansari agreed and on the second day after his graduation on 21 February 1928, he was sitting in his office at the Divan of the Emirate of Medina as the youngest employee.

=== Career ===
==== Governmental positions ====
Al-Ansari spent many years as a government employee and official. After working for the divan of the Emirate of Medina until 1940, he was appointed as vice-chairman of the Emirate's board of directors. Other posts included secretary of the Debt Settlement Committee, the Medical Aid Committee, the Charity Committee, and assistant to the Chief of the Divan in Madinah. At the same time, he was teaching Arabic literature at the school he graduated from.

In 1940, a royal order was issued by telegram from King Ibn Saud to his deputy at the time, Faisal of Saudi Arabia, to transfer Al-Ansari to Mecca in order to edit the governmental newspaper Umm Al-Qura. Al-Ansari worked in Mecca until 1942 as editor-in-chief of that newspaper, developing and enriching it with literary material, while also encouraging young writers to publish their creative works on its pages. From 1942 to 1954 he held several positions, such as Secretary of the Board of Trustees, Director of State Projects and Regulations, Director of the Kingdom's Financial Affairs at the Court, and Adviser at the Prime Minister's Divan. During that time he was appointed as a member of the Education Council under Muhammad bin Mani’ presidency. He participated in many conferences and government committees and was assigned to Riyadh during the era of Ibn Saud to organize the affairs of affiliations, statistics and residence for the city of Riyadh. After that, he gave up government positions and devoted himself to his literary work.

According to Mustafa Ibrahim Hussein, a biographer of Saudi Arabian literary writers, Al-Ansari's salary from his governmental positions helped him to pursue his literary and intellectual activities.

==== Journalism ====
In 1928, Al-Ansari's first article “What makes the Arabs rise up?” was published in the Al-Sharq Al-Adna magazine in Egypt. He expressed his opinion that the Nahda was linked to a strong Arab leader. After that, he started as a journalist and wrote in various genres for the magazines Al-Murshid Al-Arabi, Al-Sharq Al-Adna, Al-Muqtataf, Al-Risalah and Sawt Al-Hijaz, with the exception of Umm Al-Qura and Al-Manhal, for both of which he was editor-in-chief.

In late 1936, he founded Al-Manhal monthly magazine, which was famous for its continuous printing, despite crises that affected the rest of the Saudi magazines of that time, and made it the oldest Arab magazine after Al-Hilal. Al-Ansari published the first issue of Al-Manhal on 11 February 1937 in Medina, when he was an official employee. He established its headquarters in Al-Anbar Street, close to the Prophet's Mosque. Al-Manhal became known for its open attitude towards young Saudi writers, who later became prominent, including Hussain Arab, Muhammad Saeed Al-Amoudi, Ahmad Rida Huhu, Ibrahim Amin Fouda, Saleh Shata, Hamza Shehata, Abd al-Wahhab Ashi and many others. Al-Manhal was a specialized magazine concerned with cultural and literary affairs, without popular advertisements. The magazine was excluded from the changes in the new law for Saudi press in 1963, according to which the ownership of the press changed from individuals to institutions. It was the only magazine printed in the Kingdom of Saudi Arabia to remain exclusively in the name of its owner without a partner.

Al-Ansari is also considered as one of the activists and founders of literary awards in Saudi Arabia, as he proposed such awards and tried to implement them. He suggested that awards should serve two goals: an honorary (takrimiyah) and one of encouragement (tashji'iyah), based on what he understood from the Umar's Assurance. Al-Manhal as the first Saudi literary magazine to be distributed outside the country as well. It attracted the attention of other Arabs and is still considered as one of the main sources in the study of literature in the Hijaz in the modern era. Al-Manhal was issued on the first days of every Hijri month without interruption, except during the years of the Second World War, due to the high price of printing paper. It was re-issued after the war and Al-Ansari continued publishing it until his death. The magazine became a platform for his views: He called for establishing Saudi universities, giving official names to monuments and streets in Saudi cities, and a committee for scientific research. He was also one of the first Saudis to call for the establishment a radio station.

==== Literary activities ====
Al-Ansari and his colleague and friend Ubayd Madani took the first step to modernizing Arabic literature in Medina. They studied modern literature and its concepts since 1920. After working as an Arabic teacher at the School of Sharia Sciences, he opened an impromptu speaking club for the school's students, who used to gather every Thursday afternoon.

On 26 July 1930, his novel The Twins was published in Damascus. It was Al Ansari's first attempt at writing fiction and was later followed by another story, Merham Al Tanasi, which was published in the Sawt Al Hijaz newspaper. He stated that his incentive for writing The Twins was only to refute Western society's mistakes, and not to object against the Western scientific revolution. As noted on the novel's cover, it is considered the first novel in the history of Saudi literature, or more precisely in the Hijaz, because it was published during the Kingdom of Hejaz and Nejd.

In 1934, he and his colleagues founded the “Literary forum for the educated Saudi Arab youth” in Medina and started lectures and discussions in this club. It was the first time that the word "Saudi" was associated with a literary group after the Unification of Saudi Arabia.

== Death ==
Due to a serious illness, Al-Ansari frequented hospitals in Jeddah and Riyadh, until he died on the night of 22 Jumada al-Thani 1403/ 5 April 1983 at the age of 76 in Jeddah. He was buried in Mecca in the Al-Mu'alla Cemetery on the next day noon after Salat al-Janazah.

== Works ==
Literature

- Arabic: التوأمان, romanized: al-Tuwāmān, lit. 'The Twins', novel, 1928–30
- Arabic: إصلاحات في لغة الکتابة والأدب, romanized: Iṣlāḥāt fī lughat al-kitābah wa-al-adab, 1933
- Arabic: السيد أحمد الفيض آبادي, romanized: al-Sayyid Aḥmad al-Fayḍābādī, 1946
- Arabic: بناة العلم في الحجاز الحديث, lit. 'Science builders in the modern Hijaz', biographical dictionary, 1946
- Arabic: الأنصاريات, romanized: al-Anṣārīyāt, poetry collection, 1964
- Arabic: حصاد العيد: أربعة أيام مع شاعر العرب عبد المحسن الكاظمي, romanized: Ḥiṣād al-ʻīd : arbaʻa ayyām maʻa šāʻir al-ʻarab ʻAbd al-Muḥsin al-Kāẓimī, lit. 'Harvest of Eid: Four days with the Arab poet Abd al-Muhsin al-Kadhimi', 1969
- Arabic: الملك عبد العزيز في مرآة الشعر, romanized: al-Malik ʻAbd al-ʻAzīz fī mirʼāt al-shiʻr, lit. 'King Abdul Aziz in the mirror of poetry', 1974
- Arabic: مع ابن جبير في رحلته, romanized: Maʻa Ibn Jubayr fī riḥlatihi, lit. 'With Ibn Jubayr on his journey', 1976
- Arabic: رحلة في کتاب من التراث, romanized: Riḥla fī kitāb min at-turāt, 1978

History

- Arabic: منى وحدودها, romanized: Minā wa hudūduhā, lit. 'Mina and its limits', 1957
- Arabic: آثار المدينة المنورة, romanized: Āthār al-Madīnah al-Munawwara, lit. 'The monuments of Medina', 1958
- Arabic: تحقيق أمکنة مجهولة في الحجاز وتهامة, romanized: Taḥqīq āmkanah majhulah fi al-hijaz wa tahamah, 1959
- Arabic: تاريخ مدينة جدة, romanized: tārīkh madīnat Juddah, lit. 'The history of the city of Jeddah', 1963
- Arabic: التحقيقات المعدة بحتمة ضم جيم جُدة, romanized: al-Taḥqīqāt al-muʻiddah bi-ḥatmiyāt ḍamm jīm Jiddah, 1964
- Arabic: تاريخ العين العزيزية بجدة، ولمحات عن مصادر المياه في المملکة العربية السعودية, romanized: History of Aziziah water supply, Juddah & glimpses on water sources in the kingdom of Saudi Arabia, 1969
- Arabic: بين التاريخ والآثار, romanized: Bayna al-tārīkh wa-al-āthār, lit. 'Between history and monuments', 1971
- Arabic: بنو سليم، بحث في التاريخ والأدب, romanized: Banū Sulaym, 1971
- Arabic: طريق الهجرة النبوية, romanized: Tariq al-Hijrah al-Nabawiyah, lit. 'The way of Hijra', 1978
- Arabic: الطائف : تاريخا وحضارة، ومصادر ثراء وآثار وأعلاما، وعلماء وشعراء, lit. 'Taif: history and civilization...', 1977
- Arabic: رحلتنا الثانية الى منطقة الباحة, romanized: Riḥlatunā al-thāniyah ilá mintaqat al-Bāḥah, 1979
- Arabic: رحلة الباحة, 1979
- Arabic: موسوعة تاريخ مدينة جدة, romanized: Mawsūʻat tārīkh madīnat Jiddah, lit. 'Encyclopedia of the history of the city of Jeddah', 1980
- Arabic: الصيام وتفاسير الأحكام : تقديمات تلاوات آي من الذكر الحكيم, romanized: al-Ṣiyām wa-tafāsīr al-aḥkām, 1981
- Arabic: التاريخ المفصل للكعبة المشرفة قبل الاسلام, romanized: al-Tārīkh al-mufaṣṣal lil-Kaʻbah al-musharrafah qabla al-Islām, lit. 'Detailed history of the Kaaba before Islam', 1982
- Arabic: أدبنا الحديث كيف نشأ و كيف تطور, romanized: Adabunā al-ḥadīth kayfa nashaʼ wa-kayfa taṭawwar, lit. 'Our modern literature, how it originated and how it developed', 2007
