= Nawwaf =

Nawwaf is a given name of Arabic origin. Notable people with the name include:

- Nawwaf Al-Hamzi (1976–2001), one of five hijackers of American Airlines Flight 77, which they crashed into the Pentagon as part of the September 11 attacks
- Nawwaf Moussawi (born 1965), Lebanese politician
- Nawwaf Fahd Humood Al-Otaibi, held in the United States' Guantanamo Bay detention camps at its naval base in Cuba since January 2002
- Nawwaf bin Talal Al Rashid (born 1989), Saudi-Qatari royal and poet
- Nawwaf Salaam (born 1953), Lebanese diplomat, academic, and jurist
- Nawwaf bin Abdulaziz Al Saud (1932–2015), Saudi royal
- Nawwaf bin Nayef Al Saud (born 1988), Saudi royal

== See also ==
- Nawaf
