= Mahmud Arif =

Saudi Arabian poet

- محمود عارف
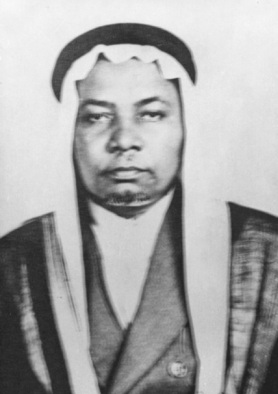
- Arif, 1970s
- Born: 1909; Jedda, Hejaz vilayet, Ottoman Empire
- Died: March 1, 2001 (aged 92); Jedda, Saudi Arabia
- Occupations: poet; journalist; official
- Writing career
- Language: Arabic
- Years active: 1963-2000

Mahmud Abd al-Khayr Al Arif (Arabic: محمود عارف, romanized: Maḥmūd ʿĀrif; 1909 – 1 March 2001), commonly known as Mahmud Arif, was a Saudi Arabian poet. He was born in Old Jedda, Hejaz. After studying in Kuttab for three years, he joined Al Falah School and graduated. He worked as a teacher there for seven years, then moved to government jobs and worked in various office and administrative support occupations, such as: editor, copy typist and lawyer in the Civil Endowments Department of the Sharia judiciary, director of passports and government residency and finally moved to the accounting department. He was chosen a member of the Consultative Assembly until his retirement in 1978. In 1963, appointed as editor-in-chief of Okaz newspaper for a year at the beginning of the new system for journalistic institutions in Saudi Arabia. He is one of the founding members of the Jeddah Society of Culture and Arts in 1975. As a poet, he published many collections of poetry and several other prose books.

== Biography ==
Mahmud Abd al-Khayr Āl Arif was born in Jeddah in 1909. An Afro-Saudi, as a child, he joined the Al-Azim kuttab, then Al Falah School, where he studied under several famous teachers, including: Muhammad Husayn Awwad, Hussain Qattar, Mustafa Nilawi, Muhammad al-Mazruqi and Abd al-Wahhab Nashar. Among his colleagues at the school were: Ahmad Qandil, Salem Ashraf, Abbas Halawani and others.

=== Occupations ===
After graduating he worked as a teacher in Al-Falah School for seven years, then moved to government jobs and worked in various office and administrative support occupations. He worked in as editor, copy typist and lawyer in the Civil Endowments Department of the Sharia judiciary, director of passports and government residency and finally moved to the accounting department in Al-Kandasah, the agency specialized in desalinating sea water in Jeddah. A member of the Jeddah Municipality, he was also chosen a member of the Consultative Assembly until his retirement in 1978.

In 1963, appointed as editor-in-chief of Okaz newspaper for a year at the beginning of the new system for journalistic institutions in Saudi Arabia. He is one of the founding members of the Jeddah Society of Culture and Arts in 1975. He also entered the sport as he co-founded Al Ahli Saudi FC in Jeddah with Omar Shams and Hassan Shams, and later left them to devote himself to his favorite team Al-Ittihad Club.

=== Poetry ===
He is best known as a sentimental poet and "a lover of beauty", he also wrote political poetry. Mahmud Arif belongs to the second generation of 20th-century Saudi Arabian poets. In some respects, his experience was romantic. He did not deviate in his poetry from the traditional Al-Khalili Arabic prosody; classic in terms of form, but its language is modern, dominated by his vision of public issues, occasions, social and historical transformations. According to Hasan al-Ni'mi, "He is one of the romantic poets who delve into the ego and his past, convinced of the badness of the outside world and its inadequacy for life... He is one of the romantic poets who dive into the pain and misery of the ego, convinced of the badness of the outside world and its inadequacy for life...who makes his poetry a permanent nostalgia for the world of salvation from evils and sins." He published many collections from 1978, most of them were collected in a two-volume book entitled The Night Hymns (Arabic: ترانيم الليل) in 1984. He also wrote several prose books.

== Personal life ==
Mahmud Arif parents died when he was young, a maternal aunt became his legal guardian. He married at a late age and had three daughters and three sons. His wife died before him.

== Death ==
He died on 22 February 2001 or 1 March in Jeddah at the age of 92.

== Awards ==
- 1978: Honored by the Jeddah Literary Club
- 1983: Literary Creativity Award, from the Modern Literature Association in Cairo

== Works ==
Poetry collections:

- Arabic: الشاطئ والسراة, romanized: al-Shāṭiʼ wa-al-sarāh, 1978
- Arabic: في عيون الليل, romanized: Fī ʻuyūn al-layl, 1979
- Arabic: الروافد, romanized: Al-rawāfid, 1980
- Arabic: أرج ووهج, romanized: Araj wa-wahaj, 1980
- Arabic: على مشارف الزمن, romanized: ʻAlá mashārif al-zaman, 1980
- Arabic: أيام من العمر, romanized: Ayyām min al-ʻumr, 1980
- Arabic: مدينتي جدة, romanized: Madīnatī Jiddah, 1981
- Arabic: رباعيات, romanized: Rubaiyat, 1984
- Arabic: المزامير, romanized: al-mazāmīr, 1984
- Arabic: مشاعر على الضفاف, romanized: Mashāʻir ʻalá al-ḍifāf
- Arabic: الفردوس الحالم, romanized: al-Firdaws al-Ḥalīm, 1984
- Arabic: ترانيم الليل, romanized: Tarānīm al-layl, 1984
- Arabic: الزحف بعد العبور, romanized: al-Zaḥf baʻda al-ʻubūr, 1989
- Arabic: عاصفة الصحراء, romanized: ʻĀṣifat al-Ṣaḥrāʼ, 1993

Books:

- Arabic: أصداء قلم, romanized: Aṣdāʼ qalam, autobiography, 1982
- Arabic: حصاد الأيام, romanized: Ḥiṣād al-ayyām, essays, 1987
