= Melhem =

Melhem (Arabic: ملحم), also written Milhim and Milhem, is an Arabic surname and masculine given name, meaning "King of the night". Notable bearers of the name include:

== Surname ==
- Adnan Melhem (born 1989), Lebanese footballer
- Belques Melhem (born 1977), Saudi poet
- Cesar Melhem (born 1965), Australian trade unionist
- D. H. Melhem (1926–2013), American poet
- Edgardo Melhem Salinas (born 1969), Mexican politician
- Hisham Melhem, Lebanese journalist
- Marcius Melhem (born 1972), Brazilian actor and comedian
- Mohammed Milhim (1929–2021), Palestinian politician
- Stephane Milhim (born 1990), American football player

== Given name ==
- Melhem Barakat (1942–2016), Lebanese singer
- Milhem Cortaz (born 1971), Brazilian actor
- Melhem Karam (1932–2010), Lebanese writer and journalist
- Melhem B. Maalouf (1937–1996), Lebanese judge
- Melhem Zein (born 1982), Lebanese singer

== See also ==
- Məlhəm, Azerbaijan
