= Museums in Riyadh =

Museums in Riyadh include history, art, heritage and technology museums in the Riyadh region of Saudi Arabia.

== The National Museum ==
The National Museum, inaugurated in 1999, is a large national museum that brings together Saudi authenticity and modernist architecture. It narrates the historical and cultural story of Arabia and the phases of development and growth of the Kingdom passed. So, it considered one of the prominent tourist destinations in Riyadh.

=== Human and Universe Hall ===
This hall has an area of 1500 Square Meters. It represents everything related to humans, planet, earth, movements of continents, rocks, and minerals towards extinct animals that existed in Arabia, and more.

=== Arabian Mamluk Hall ===
The area measuring of this hall is 1,500 Square Meters. It includes the emergence period of Arabian Mamluk and Arabia’s business through the antiquity of Islam, reflecting the period from the 4th millennium BC to the end of the 4th century.

=== Pre-Islamic Period Hall ===
This hall covers 500 Square Meters, representing the period from the year 400 to the Prophet’s mission.

=== Prophet’s Mission Hall ===
The hall covers 350 Square Meters and representing the period from the beginning of Islam to its spread.

=== Islam and Prophet’s Migration Hall ===
The hall has 1,200 Square Meters and begins from the early years of Islam to the Ottoman era and divided into six sections.

=== The Two Saudi States Hall ===
This hall represents the first and second Saudi States.

=== The Unification of the Kingdom Hall ===
The area measuring of this hall is 1,200 Square Meters. It represents the period the third Saudi States arose by the former King Abdulaziz Al-Saud.

=== Al-Hajj and Al-Haramain Hall ===
The area measuring of this hall is 800 Square Meters. It represents Hajj and rites with all the matters that related to them, and it has five wards.

== Archaeological Museum (King Saud University) ==
This museum is located King Saud University on the ground floor of the college of literature. It houses antiquities unearthed in expeditions in the kingdom of Saudi Arabia.

== Currency Museum ==
The SAMA Money Museum is a specialized historical and cultural museum affiliated with the Saudi Arabian Monetary Agency. Exhibits include ancient coins, pre-Islamic currencies and new currency.

The museum also has exhibits on how bills and coins are produced.

== Al-Masmak Palace Museum ==
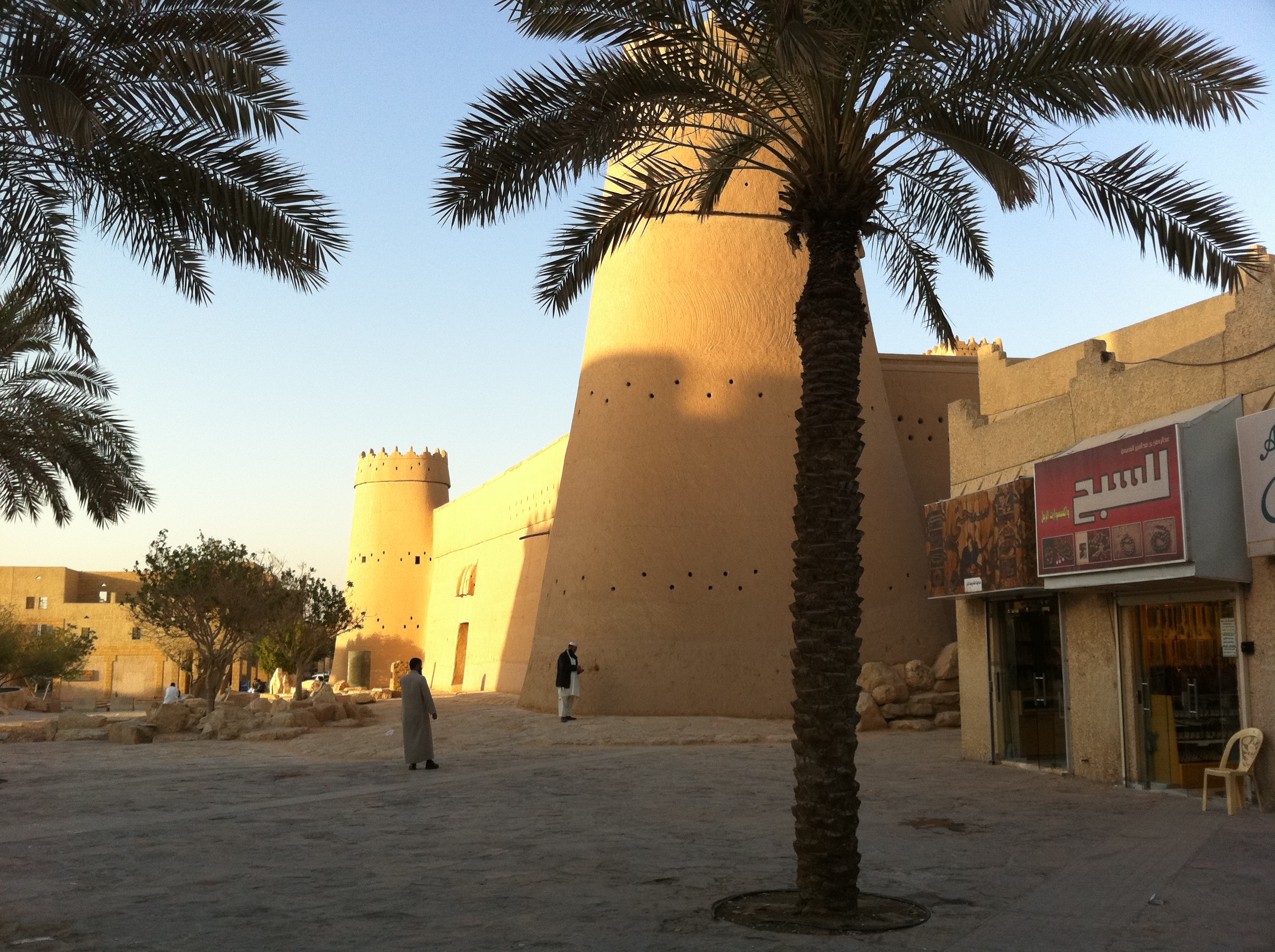
View of the SW corner of the Masmak castle

Al-Masmak palace has occupied a prominent place in the history of the Kingdom in general and in Riyadh in particular. The story of its construction belongs to the era of Imam Abdullah bin Faisal bin Turkey Al-Saud in 1282 AH /1865 AD. This fort is a part of a large castle that mediates the city of Riyadh. Besides, it represents the King’s first start to unify the Kingdom of Saudi Arabia in 1319 AH /1902 AD. Also, it used as a repository of ammunition and weapons for two years, then it became a prison, and then it was converted into a heritage landmark in the middle of Riyadh. In 1400 AH / 1980 AD, King Salman bin Abdulaziz Al-Saud has ordered to restore the museum, and in the year 1416 AH /1995 AD, it was opened as a museum. The museum contains pictures, maps, sculptures, some ancient weapons, heritage pieces, and an audiovisual exhibition hall. Al-Masmak means the thick, raised, and hippocampal structure.

The Halls include:

- The main patio
- Riyadh (time to recover it)
- Al-Masmak break-in
- Al-rawad
- Historical Riyadh
- Al-Masmak Palace
- Al-Masmak uses
- The Last Hall
- The Well Patio
- Temporary exhibits

Features include:

- The gate
- The mosque
- The council
- The well
- The towers

== Saqr Aljazeera Aviation Museum ==
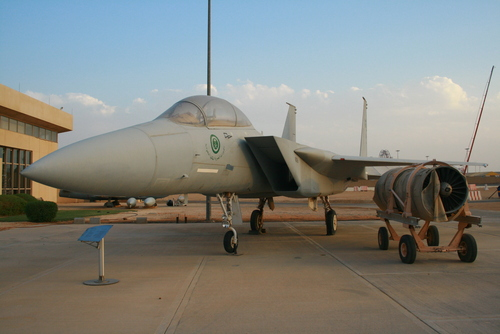
F-15D Eagle

This museum is one of the museums that concern about aviation. It is an air museum narrating the history of Royal Saudi Air Force development since its inception by King Abdulaziz until this present day. The museum belongs to the Ministry of Defense. In 1419 AH /1999 AD, Saqr Aljazeera Aviation museum opened under the auspices of his royal highness Prince Abdullah bin Abdulaziz to mark the centenary of opening Riyadh city. Since then, he has received official delegations, guests, and official visitors in that museum.

=== Objectives ===
- Documenting and highlighting the efforts to build and develop the Royal Saudi Air Force by the rulers, commanders, and officials, and to employ it in educating the employees of the special air force, armed forces in general, citizens and visitors.
- Urging young people to think about aviation and space sciences through exhibits and means of education and entertainment.

=== The exhibits ===
The museum includes:

- Indoor exhibition rooms with its contents of ancient and modern planes and weapons.
- An extensive collection of aircraft, collectibles, photographs, and historical documents.
- A space corner, which includes a device that similar to the devices intended for spaceflight.
- Booths for documentary and past films.
- An open showground that shows some aircraft in their exact sizes as well as large equipment.

== See also ==
- Museums in Saudi Arabia
