= Ahmad Qandil =

Saudi Arabian poet (1911–1979)

- أحمد قنديل
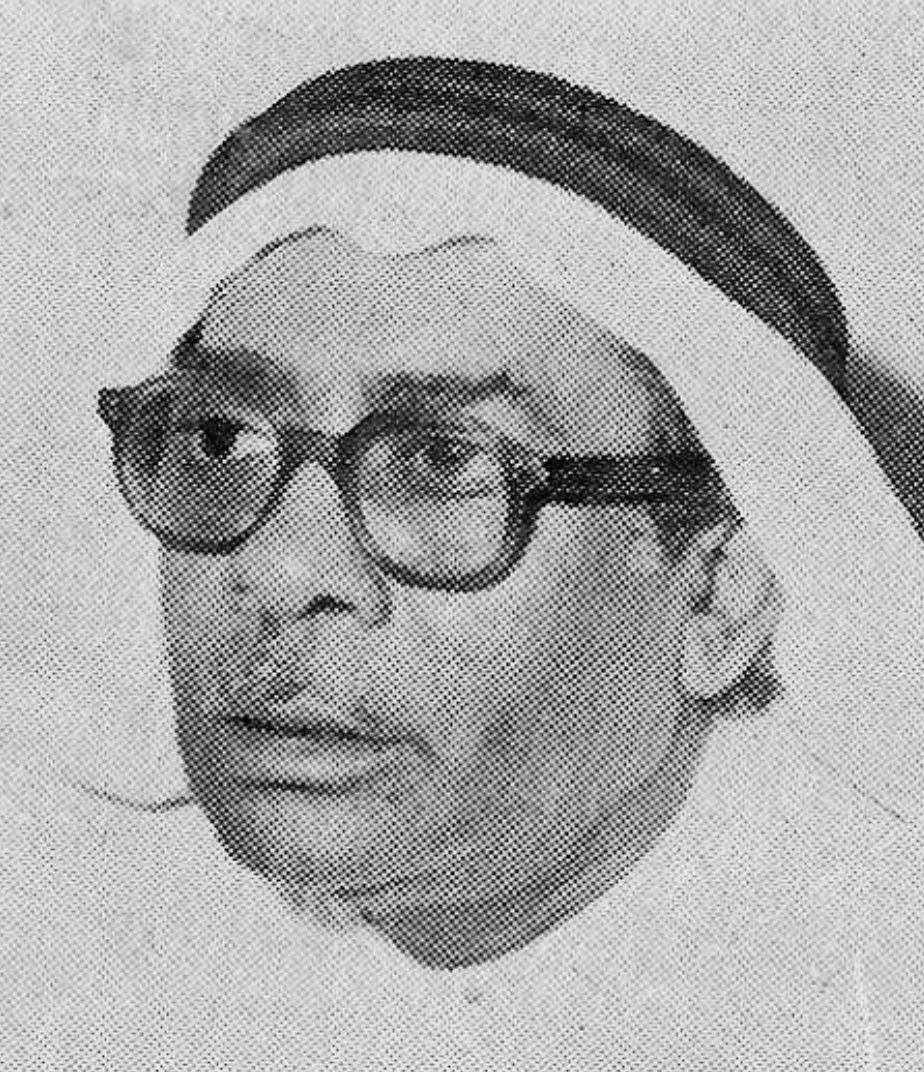
- Qandil, 1960s
- Born: 1911; Jeddah, Hejaz vilayet, Ottoman Empire
- Died: July 7, 1979 (aged 68); Jeddah, Mecca Province, Saudi Arabia
- Occupations: poet; journalist; teacher; official
- Writing career
- Language: Arabic
- Years active: 1939-1979
- Genres: Folk poetry, Narrative poetry

Ahmad Qandil (Arabic: أحمد قنديل, romanized: Aḥmad Qandīl; c. 1911 – 7 July 1979) was a Saudi Arabian poet and writer, emerged as a folk-popular poet who centralized Middle class culture in his Hejazi Arabic poetry and prose. Born in Jeddah, he studied and then taught at Al-Falah School, worked around one year as editor-in-chief of Sawt Al-Hijaz newspaper in Mecca, hold some positions in Ministry of Finance such as general manager of Hajj. After retirement from government occupations, he devoted himself to literary writing and media production in an institution he established, through which he cooperated with radio and television of Jeddah. He died at the age of 68 while recording the last episode of his program on Jeddah TV "Ramadan Lanterns", and left many collections of poetry some of which were published after his death.

== Biography ==
His full name (nasab) was Ahmad bin Saleh bin Ahmad al-Ubaydi or al-Abidi, "Qandil" was his family laqab. He was born around 1911 AD / 1329 AH in Al-Balad, Jeddah, Hejaz vilayet and grew up there. Educated at Al-Falah School, and after graduating appointed as a teacher in same school. In Al-Falah, he studied under several prominent professors, including: Muhammad Hassan Awad. Among his colleagues were a number of pioneers, such as: Hamza Shehata, Mahmoud Aref and Muhammad Ali Maghribi.

=== Occupations ===
He worked as a teacher at Al-Falah School for a long time, until he moved to Mecca as editor-in-chief of the newspaper Sawt Al-Hijaz in 1936. He remained its editor-in-chief from 19 October 1936 to 10 July 1937. After that, he held other positions, including an editor at the Ministry of Finance, along with other writers such as Abd al-Wahhab Ashi, Muhammad Hass Faqi and Muhammad Hasan Kutubi, who had the greatest impact in modernizing the official and administrative editorial style in the Kingdom of Saudi Arabia. Last position he held was the General Manager of Hajj after the two other writers Muhammad Surur al-Sabban and Muhammad Salih al-Qazzaz. After his retirement, he practiced some freelance work in Cairo and Beirut, in addition to his literary career as writer of radio and television episodes. He founded the Qandil Publishing House, and contributed to the Okaz Foundation for Press and Publishing.

He also established an institution bearing his name in Beirut during his stay there in 1969, to undertake media business. After the outbreak of the civil war in Lebanon, he returned to his county.

=== Poetry and prose ===
He began writing poetry at an early age, in Standard Arabic and the Hijazi dialect, vernacular of his region. His prose described "sarcastic and graceful in expression" by Hasan Al-Ni'mi, which "made him a writer closer to the popular spirit, whether in his poetry or prose, and his literary creativity is abundant and varied." He wrote satirical poetry and prose, published them in several newspapers by using the meaning of his last name, which means lantern in Arabic, nicknames such as "Lanterns" (Arabic: قناديل) and "Colored Lanterns" (Arabic: قناديل ملونة), also his program on Saudi TV was titled "The Lanterns of Ramadan" (Arabic: قناديل رمضان).

As a poet, he belongs to the second generation of 20th-century Saudi Arabian poets. Qandil is also distinguished by his ability to influence both the public and the private readers of literature through his satirical style of social criticism, in an easy and non-vulgar way. His awareness of the role of literature led him to expresses his concern towards society. He was known as a folk-popular poet.The subjects of his poems are various : ghazal, nationalism, praise, nature, etc. He wrote on Islamic topics as well. He has been described as a poet of life, of nature and imagination, and a poet of simplicity and smoothness by Al-Babtain dictionary. In journalism, he was known for his poetic writings in Hejazi Arabic, and wrote a daily column of folk poetry in the Okaz newspaper, dealing with social problems.

Qandil participated in the establishment of the Youth Club in Jeddah with his peers, which is considered a pioneering experience years before literary clubs officially appeared in Saudi Arabia.

== Personal life ==
He was fond of traveling for various purposes. He visited Egypt, Lebanon, Sudan, Italy, Switzerland, France, and England, Germany and Greece. Reading books, walking, traveling, and chess playing were among his hobbies and interests. He also used to wrote poetry for vocalists of wedding music, to present their songs at wedding parties more impressive.

== Death ==
Ahmad Qandil died on the morning of 12 Sha’ban 1399/ 7 July 1979 at the age of 68 in his birthplace. The Jeddah Municipality named a street after him, the street leading to his home.

== Works ==
Poetry collections:

- Arabic: أصداء : من الحياة و إليها, romanized: Aṣdāʼ min al-ḥayāh wa-ilayhā, 1951
- Arabic: أبراج ونار, romanized: al-Abrāj, 1951
- Arabic: أغاريد, romanized: Aqārid, 1953
- Arabic: شمعتي تكفي, 1951
- Arabic: المركاز, romanized: al-Mirkaz, 1965
- Arabic: نار, romanized: Nār, 1967
- Arabic: قريتي الخضراء, romanized: Qaryatī al-Ḫaḍrāʾ, 1973
- Arabic: أوراقي الصفراء, romanized: Aurāqi 'ṣ-ṣafrāʼ, 1973
- Arabic: الراعي والمطر, 1976
- Arabic: قاطع الطريق: قصة شعرية, romanized: Qāṭiʻ al-ṭarīq : qiṣṣah shiʻrīyah, 1977
- Arabic: نقر العصافير, romanized: Naqr al-ʻaṣāfīr, 1981
- Arabic: الأصداف, romanized: al-Aṣdāf, 1981
- Arabic: مكتي قبلتي: شعر وشعراء, romanized: Makkatī qiblatī : shiʻr wa-shuʻarāʼ, 1983
- Arabic: اللوحات, romanized: al-Lawḥāt, 1989
- Arabic: عروس البحر, romanized: ʻArūs al-baḥr, 1989

Non-poetry:

- Arabic: أبو عرام والبشكة, novel, 1977
- Arabic: الجبل اللذي صار سهلا, romanized: al-Jabal alladhī ṣāra sahlan, biography, 1980
