= Musaid al-Rashidi =

Musaid bin Rabie Al-Khiari Al-Rashidi (1382 AH / 1962 – 14 Rabi' Al-Thani 1438 AH / January 12, 2017, AD) was a Saudi Nabataean poet and a brigadier-general in the Saudi National Guard.

== His life ==
Musaid al-Rashidi
- Born: Musaid bin Rabie Al-Khiari Al-Rashidi; 1962 Dammam, Saudi Arabia
- Died: January 12, 2017 (age 55) Riyadh, Saudi Arabia
- Children: Renad, Faisal, Retaj, Talal, Diala, Thamir, and Limar

He was born in Dammam in 1382 AH, and has spent his early childhood years in Kuwait. He started studying in Khamis Mushait while his father in the military. He graduated from high school in Khamis Mushait. He finished high school and joined The National Guard College, then graduated as an officer and worked in Riyadh until he reached the rank of brigadier in the Saudi National Guard.

== His poetic beginnings ==
His poetic career began more than three decades ago on the pages of "Al Yamamah" magazine, which embraced its early beginnings. In this regard, his colleague Rashid bin Jaithan said: I received the first texts of Musaid by mail in 1397, they reflected a unique and new talent. Indeed, his first poems got published:

I swore not to tell you while I'm alive

only if you forgot I told you not to

He continued after that and there was a noticeable development that reflects the extent of his passion, interest, culture, grasp on tune, and mastery of them, in addition, to his deep sensibility, comprehensive style, creative ideas, and new metaphors. During his teenage, his father noticed Musaid's tendencies for poetry and advised him not to read poetry, but his poetic instinct was strong. He has many ancient poems that have not been published. Musaid Al-Rashidi grew up in a family known for their poetic tendencies. His mother was a poet, and his uncle and father were also. Musaid was sent to the US for a year, and during that period he was very longing for his home, so he wrote his well-known poem:

- Either from the winter, or the sadness I am upset ooh my bird! ... I'm asking you please go away

== His evening events ==
Al-Jawf City in northern Saudi Arabia hosted his first evening event with the participation of the poets Nayef Saqr and Majid Al-Shawi. Then came the Kuwait evening event, which he considered it his real breakthrough, subsequent by the Bahrain evening event, and the evening event of the National Festival for Heritage and Culture in Riyadh, with the participation of poets: Muhammad Palmer from the United Arab Emirates, Abdul Rahman Al-Abnoudi from Egypt, and Fahd Afat which was managed by Said Surayhi, then the evenings took place in Jeddah, Hail, Al-Majma’ah, Dammam, Qassim, Abha, and some Saudi areas, including the rest of the Gulf countries. He also participated as a representative for Saudi Arabia in the Festival of Folk Poetry in Libya.

His last evening event was in 2014 in “Hala February”, with the participation of his friend Nayef Saqrm, and the “My Beloved Country” evening event which was held by The Culture and Arts Association at the King Fahd Center in the capital, Riyadh, on the occasion of the Saudi National Day. Musaid performed several evenings in Riyadh, Madinah, Buraidah, Najran, Hail, Al-Majmaah, Abha and others. He also held poetry evenings outside the Kingdom; one of the evenings was held in Kuwait at the Hala February Festival 2014.

He was also hosted in many television programs, one of them was (Danat) program with Najah Al-Masaeed on Abu Dhabi Channel. The press interviews were held with him including an interview in Al-Makhtlaf magazine.

He was hosted by the broadcaster Ali Al-Olayani in his program Ya Hala Ramadan on Rotana Khaleejia Channel.

In a press interview, Prince Badr bin Abdul Mohsen was asked about the best poet, he mentioned Musaed Al-Rashidi.

== Publications ==
1. (Adoring Sword).
2. (Pomegranate on ice).
3. (A Heard Diwan Audio entitled Marahish).

== his sung poems ==
- Muhammad Abdo (Did you forgot).
- Abdul Majeed Abdullah (An Eye Which Satarald You With Vison), (Only Your Voice Left), (It doesn't have two hearts), (injures memory).
- Talal Salama (New Love).
- Ahmed Al-Jumairi (Since Then The Wind Harling His Scarf).
- The Merciful Boy (Mozoh Memory).
- Muhammad Al-Suleiman (Adoring Sword), (Jabk Allah), (Daughter in Law).
- Abbas Ibrahim (Al-Tuareg).
- (My Friend Don't Chase Life It's Nonsense), which was composed by Yasser Abu Ali and sung by Rashid Al-Faris, It was out in the market a month before his death.
- Ahlam (Winter Sadness).

He cooperated with many singers, such as Muhammad Abdo, Abdul Majeed Abdullah, Ahmed Al-Jumairi, Rashid Al-Faris, Muhammad Al-Sulaiman, Talal Salama and Abbas Ibrahim.

== His Death ==
He died in King Abdulaziz Medical City for the National Guard on Thursday morning, January 12, 2017, after suffering from illness, at the age of 55 years. The prayer was held for him after the afternoon prayer at Al-Rajhi Mosque in Riyadh. The prayer was attended by Prince Miteb bin Abdullah Al Saud, former Minister of the National Guard, and a number of Gulf poets. and was buried in the Naseem cemetery in Riyadh.
