= The Twins (1930 novel) =

1930 Arabic novel by 'Abd al-Qaddous al-Ansary

- Author: Abd al-Quddus al-Ansari
- Language: Arabic
- Subject: Philosophy of education
- Genre: Social novel
- Published: July 26, 1930

The Twins or Al-Tawa’aman is a novel by Saudi Arabian writer Abd al-Quddus al-Ansari. It was published in Damascus in 1350 AH (1930 CE) and was the first novel in modern Saudi literature. The novel’s cover stated that it is the “first novel in the Hijaz”, because it was published during the dual monarchy period of the Kingdom of Hijaz and Najd. The Twins is considered to have initiated the art of fiction in Saudi Arabia.

== Background ==
The Twins was Al Ansari’s first attempt in writing fiction, and was later followed by another story, Merham Al Tanasi, which was published in Sawt Al Hijaz newspaper. He stated that his incentive for writing The Twins was only to "refute Western lies, and not to object against the Western scientific revolution."

== Plot ==
The Twins tells the story of Saleem, the father of newborn twins named Rasheed and Fareed. On reaching school age, the twins were sent to a preparatory school. After their graduation, Rasheed joined a national school while Fareed joined a foreign one. As time passed, Rasheed advanced in his career and improved his social status, thus becoming a well-respected individual. Fareed, on the other hand, ended up in a tragic situation, where he became morally decayed and died afterwards in exile in a foreign country.

== Literary style ==
The Twins is a long novel that falls under the genre of social literature. In the novel’s introduction, Al Ansari states that he wanted to demonstrate the harm foreign institutes in the East can cause to the future of the East, because of their teaching about Westernization and vacillation^{[better expression needed]}. Despite being the first modern novel by a Saudi author, The Twins was not so much written for artistic purposes. "Even though it is not well-formulated based on the origins of the modern art of fiction, the reader might find a proper image of the harm caused by foreign institutes", the author states in the introduction.

The events are not presented in temporal sequence, but are rather controlled by the forced event element, which aligns with the purpose of the novel. It seems that the author had decided what the end of the story will be before its start, and thus the events moved quickly towards the end. What is noticed is how slowly the events were growing in the large part of the story, while upon reaching the end, some events were cut, which left the reader with their outcomes only.

The Twins is considered the first novel in the history of Saudi literature, and arguably the first novel written in the Arabian Peninsula. It is considered one of the founding novels of Saudi fiction, which, according to Mansour Al Hazmi, are six:

1. Ghada Oum Al Korra by Ahmed Reda Houhou
2. Fekrah by Ahmed Al Subaie
3. The Twins or al-Tawa’aman by Abd Al Quddus Al Ansari
4. Al Ba’ath by Muhammad Ali Maghrabi
5. Al Zawjah Wa Al Sadiq by Muhammad Omar Tawfiq
6. Al Intiqam Al Tabii by Muhammad Nour Jawhari

== Reception ==
In December 2011, a play based on The Twins brought back the memory of its author. It had the same title as the novel and was written and directed by Ali Al Zahrani. It is a monodrama and was performed for the first time by two protagonists. The play’s title, The Twins, was taken from Abd Al Quddus Al Ansari’s novel, of which Al Zahrani wanted to preserve the memory. The actors were Abd Al Rahman Khafaji and Abd Al Rahman Fawzi and the stage director was Saleh Bin Saeed Abu Al Baraa.

== Editions ==
The Twins was first printed on 1 Rabi I, 1349 AH (July 26, 1930 CE) by Al Taraqi press in Damascus. It was republished by Dar Al Manhal for Journalism and Publication, with an introduction by Muhammad Hamdoon.

== See also ==
- Zaynab
- Modern Arabic literature
