= Laila al-Ouhaydib =

Laila al-Ouhaydib (Arabic: ليلى الأحيدب) is a Saudi Arabian short story writer and novelist. Her debut collection of short stories came out in 1997. Her stories have appeared in English translation in Banipal magazine and in Beyond the Dunes (2006), an anthology of contemporary Saudi literature. More recently, in 2009, she published her first novel under the title The Eyes of Foxes (عيون الثعالب).
