= Hadeel Alhodaif =

Saudi blogger (1983-2008)

Hadeel Alhodaif (Arabic: هديل الحضيف; April 19, 1983 – May 16, 2008) was a pioneering Saudi blogger.

Born in 1983 in Riyadh, Alhodaif was known for her work as a writer and social critic. She gained prominence across the Saudi web for her blog, Heaven's Steps. She viewed blogging as a "new free media" that could challenge Saudi Arabia's media establishment and promote freedom of speech in the kingdom. In a restrictive media environment, bloggers such as Alhodaif began to gain cult status in this period.

She gained recognition for refusing to write under a pen name, and she encouraged other Saudi women to eschew anonymity online and write on serious subjects of political importance. She found supporters among both liberals and conservatives, promoting freedom of expression while continuing to wear a niqab.

Beyond blogging, Alhodaif produced several works of fiction, publishing the short story collection Their Shadows Don't Follow Them. She also wrote plays, including Who Fears the Doors?, which was produced at King Saud University in 2007. However, she was unable to attend the production, as the actors were male and the university forbid men and women from mingling.

Alhodaif unexpectedly fell into a coma in April 2008 and died the following month, at only 25 years old. After her death, in 2015, her work was included in the French-language collection 12 nouvelles d'Arabie saoudite.
