= Nawaf =

Nawaf (Arabic: نواف) is an Arabic name for males. Notable people named Nawaf include:

- Nawaf Al Abed (born 1990), Saudi Arabian footballer
- Nawaf Ahmed (born 1992), Indian cricketer
- Nawaf Al-Aqidi (born 2000), Saudi Arabian professional footballer
- Nawaf Boushal (born 1999), Saudi Arabian professional footballer
- Nawaf Falah (born 1986), Iraqi footballer
- Nawaf al-Fares, Syrian ambassador to Iraq
- Nawaf Ghazaleh (1927–2005), Syrian assassin
- Nawaf Hazazi (born 2002), Saudi Arabian professional footballer
- Nawaf al-Hazmi (1976–2001), Saudi hijacker of American Airlines Flight 77
- Nawaf Al-Khaldi (born 1981), Kuwaiti footballer
- Nawaf Massalha (1943–2021), Israeli Arab politician
- Nawaf Mubarak (born 1981), Emirati footballer
- Nawaf Obaid, Saudi Arabian political scientist
- Nawaf Al-Ahmad Al-Jaber Al-Sabah (1937–2023), Emir of Kuwait
- Nawaf Al-Sadi (born 2000), Saudi Arabian professional footballer
- Nawaf Salam (born 1953), Lebanese diplomat, academic, and jurist
- Nawaf bin Faisal Al Saud (born 1978), Saudi Arabian royal
- Nawaf Shukralla (born 1976), Bahraini football referee
- Nawaf Al-Sobhi (born 1990), Saudi Arabian professional footballer
- Nawaf Al-Temyat (born 1976), Saudi Arabian footballer
