= Naif Gahani =

Saudi poet and writer

- نايف الجهني
- Born: 1968 (age 57–58); Saudi Arabia
- Education: Arab University of Amman
- Title: poet and writer
- Awards: Tabuk Award for Academic Excellence in 1996

Naif Gahani (Arabic: نايف الجهني) is a Saudi poet and writer, born in Qurayyat in 1968. He was the head of the Tabuk Literary Club in 2012, and he created a corner called (Abaq Al-Khuzama) in Al-Riyadh newspaper. He published many books, which vary between poetry, novels and intellectual writings. One of his notable works is a book called (Karma in Islam: A Technique of Healing by Ethics and Spiritual Energy).

== Education ==
He obtained a doctorate degree in technical learning and its impact on achievement in the Arabic language from the Arab University of Amman in the Hashemite Kingdom of Jordan.

== Career ==
He works as a member of the faculty at the University of Tabuk.

He was assigned to be the president of the Tabuk Literary Club in 2012.

He worked as the director of the Culture and Arts Association in Tabuk.

== Works ==
- Diwan (quickly as someone who does not pass)(original text: sryean kaman laa yamuru)eloquent poetry. It was released in 1997.
- Diwan (The North of the Soul) (original text: shmal alruwh) written in colloquial Arabic. Released in 2000.
- Diwan (Qaisum's windows) (original text: nuafidh alqisum) eloquent poetry. Released in 2000.
- The novel (The Limits) (original text: alhudud). Published in 2003. It is a novel that draws details from Bedouin life in the Saudi desert in northern Saudi Arabia.
- (Karma in Islam: A Technique of Healing by Ethics and Spiritual Energy) (original text: alkarma fi al'iislam: taqniat aleilaj bial'akhlaq walttaqat alruwhia) published by the Arab Science House.
- Diwan (Hoda) eloquent poetry. Issued by the Arab Science House in 2010.
- (Beyond consciousness: a contemplation of my faith in human abilities in the prospects of "parapsychology") (original text: maa wara' alwaey: tamal 'iimani fi alqudrat eind albashar afaq "albarasykuluji") published by the Arab Science House in 2012.
- The novel (Tabawa) published by the Arab Science House in 2012.
- Diwan (Hanin Barri) issued by the Arab Science House in 2013.
- (Sophology of self-consciousness of the moment) (original text: sufiulujia waey allah'dat bidhatiha) issued by Defaf publications in 2014.
- (Cosmology: Reflections on Poetic Existence) (original text: kuniat: tamulat fi alwujud alshaerii), published by Defaf Publications in 2014.
- Diwan (Faraway as a prediction ...!) (original text: beida katanbuw) Issued by the Arab Expansion Foundation in 2016.
- (Intention karma: from the earth of cause to the sky of results) (original text: karama alnya: min 'ar'd alsabab 'iilaa sama' alnatija).

== Honors and awards ==
- He received the Tabuk Award for Academic Excellence in 1996.
- He was honored by the Tabuk Literary Club in 2011.
- The Culture and Arts Association in Jeddah honored him in cooperation with the Jeddah Literary Club in 2019 in an evening entitled (Naif Gahani, The Biography and the journey), in appreciation of his efforts in the field of culture, arts and poetry.
