= Mohammed Alrotayyan =

Saudi journalist and writer

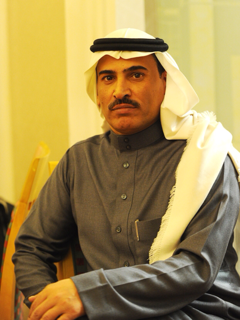
- Born: Rafha, Saudi Arabia
- Occupations: Journalist, novelist, poet

Mohammed Alrotayyan, (Arabic: محمد الرطيان) is a Saudi journalist and novelist. In 1992, he started publishing in Saudi newspaper and Middle-Eastern newspapers. He also worked as a journalist for the Fawasil and Qutoof Magazines, and he has writings published in several publications. Generally, he is considered a public journalist with no affiliations to any political parties.

== Career ==
Alrotayyan has published newspaper articles, short stories and poetry in several newspapers. Currently, he publishes daily articles for the Saudi newspaper Al-Madina.

Alrotayyan was Saudi Arabia's representative in the Eighth Middle Eastern Festival for Poetry and Fiction. His name was listed as the best writer and poet in a survey conducted by the Kuwaiti Al-Mokhtalif magazine. Similarly, he appeared in Forbes as one of the 100 most influential Arabs. In 2018 rankings of Thought Leaders in the Arab world, Alrotayyan was on top of the list, which includes 112 figures.

His short story Halil (Arabic: هليل) won him first place in the short story competition. In addition to that, his novel What's Left of Mohammad al-Touban's Papers (Arabic: ما تبقى من أوراق محمد الطوبان) won the Novel of the Year reward in 2010.

== Works ==
Books

- Book! (original title: Kitab!), 2008
- A Third Try (original title: Al-Mohawalah Al-Thalitha), 2011
- Comandments (original title: Wasayah), 2012
- Songs of the Blue Bird (original title: Aghani Al-Ousfor Al-Azraq), 2014
- Roznama, 2017
- Dao-daa, to be published

Novels

- What’s Left of Mohammad Al-Touban’s Papers (original title: Ma Tabaka min Awrak Mohammad Al-Touban), 2009

Poetry

Alrotayyan was invited to read his poems in many festivals, including:

- Al-Janadriyah National Festival
- Al-Qareen
- Al-Babteen
- Hala February
- The Saud bin-Bandr I Festival
- Jeddah 2000
