= Ahmad Rida Huhu =

Algerian writer and novelist (1910–1956)

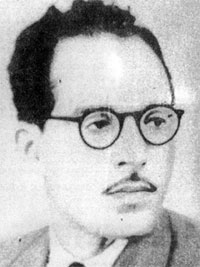
- Born: December 15, 1910; Sidi Okba, Biskra Province; Algeria
- Died: 1956 (aged 45–46); Constantine, Algeria
- Occupations: Writer; novelist; journalist
- Movement: Association of Algerian Muslim Ulema

Ahmad Rida Huhu (Arabic: أحمد رضا حوحو) was a writer, novelist, and journalist was born on the 15 December 1910 in the village of Sidi Okba in the Biskra Province of Algeria. He grew up in Algeria and moved to Hejaz to complete his higher education in 1935. In 1956, Huhu was arrested by the French police and taken to Djebel El Wahch, where he was executed.

== Early life ==
Huhu was born on the 15 December 1910 in the village of Sidi Okba in the Biskra Province. He started his education at al-kuttab at an early age like all Algerians at the time. Then, he attended elementary school. Upon successful completion of his elementary education, his father sent him to Skikda to continue his studies in a private school in 1928. As a result of the French policy that did not allow Algerians to continue their education, Huhu could not finish high school, therefore, he went back to the South and started working as a telegraph for Sidi Okba post office. And that is what made him learn more about life, as he noticed the difference between two different environments: a rural desert environment and an urban one.

In 1935, he moved with his family to Hejaz by sea, and as soon as he arrived at Medina, he enrolled in the college of Sharia to complete his studies. In 1937 his first article was published in Al-Rabita Arabic Magazine. In addition, in 1938, he graduated from the college of Sharia with high grades, which made him eligible for a teaching position in the same college. He was appointed Editorial Secretary of Al-Manhal Magazine in the same year, but after two years he resigned from the job and moved to Mecca, where he worked at the international department of the mail and telephone office. He stayed at that job until he returned to Algeria in 1946 after the death of his parents.

== Associations ==
After returning, Huhu joined the Association of Algerian Muslim Ulema and became an active member. He was also appointed principal of a school Sheikh Ben Badis founded himself, and he stayed there for about two years. Later, he was transferred to administrate a school in a town near Constantine, but he only stayed there for a short while before going to Constantine to work as a general clerk at one of Ben Badis’ institutions. On the 25th of September 1946, Huhu published an article on Al-Basaer Journal after they started publishing again. Additionally, in 1948, he was elected as a member of the Board of Directors of the Association of Algerian Muslim Ulema. In 1949, and in the second week of May, Huhu participated in the World Peace Council to represent Algeria.

On 27 October, he organized the Association El Mazhar Constantine, and through it, he showed plays such as: Queen of Granada (original: mlkt ġrnāṭā), The Florist (original: bāyʿt ālwrd), and The Greedy (original: ālbẖyl).

On 15 December 1949, together with a group of friends, Huhu founded a newspaper called Ash-Shula Newspaper, of which he was the editor-in-chief. Fifty issues of the newspaper, which targeted those who were against the Association of Algerian Muslim Ulama were published. The editorial of the first issue said, this newspaper “will be like arrows in the chests of your enemies, and a bomb in the crowd of those against you.”

== Major works ==
- "Ghada Umm al-Qura" (original: ġādā um āl-qurā), 1947. A story of Hijazi women's life. It is considered one of the first precursors that contributed to establishing the Arab-Algerian story.
- "With Hakim’s Donkey" (original: mʿ ḥmār āl-ḥakim), 1953. This work consists of sarcastic dialogues (between Huhu and Tawfiq Al-Hakim’s donkey). Huhu wrote it using the same style as Tawfiq Al-Hakim's My Donkey Told Me. He starts his story by saying that after he finished reading My Donkey Told Me, he took a nap in his chair and dreamt of a donkey that turned out to be Al-Hakim's donkey who always seems wise. And the two had interesting social dialogues on women, politics, economy, education, and the fate of his country Algeria, etc.
- The Revelator (original: Ṣāḥibat al-waḥy), 1954.
- Human Examples (original: nmāḏǧ bašryā), a collection of short stories published in 1955.

Huhu has translations of French literature, as well as an intellectual activity represented by his short stories, as he is considered the pioneer of the short story in Algeria. "Yafel, The Star of Literature" (original: yāfl nǧm ālādb), "The Valley's Son" (original: ābn ālwādy), "The Last Adib" (original: ālādyb ālāẖyr), “Ghada Umm al-Qura” (original: ġādā um āl-qurā), and "With Hakim’s Donkey" (original: mʿ ḥmār āl-ḥakim) are some of his short stories.

After the outbreak of the Algerian War of Independence, and in 1955, Huhu published his collection of short stories within the Book of Resurrection, the Tunisian series. Huhu continuing his work at the Institute of Ben Badis still raised the suspicion of the French police, who arrested him in 1956 and threatened to execute him for being responsible for every incident in the city.

== Death ==
On 29 March 1956, Constantine police governor was assassinated, and Huhu was arrested at his house at 6:00 pm and sent to Al-Kodia prison. He was then taken to Djebel El Wahch, where he was executed. After the independence of Algeria, his body and eight others were found buried in one pit in Oued el Hamimin. He was reburied in the Martyrs' Cemetery in El Khroub. Freedom struggle martyr, Ahmad Rida Huhu, fought for his country and for freedom of speech. He fought, both socially and politically, and used his pen to enrich Algerian literature.
