= Saad Al-Hamidin =

- سعد بن عبدالله الحُميدين
- Born: 1947 (age 78–79); Ta’if, Saudi Arabia
- Occupations: Poet and journalist

Saad bin Abdullah Al-Humaidin (Arabic: سعد بن عبدالله الحُميدين) is a Saudi poet and journalist, born in Ta’if in 1947. Al-Humaidin holds a Teacher Institute diploma and has worked as a cultural literary editor for the Al-Riyadh newspaper.

Al-Humaidin has also worked as an editorial secretary for Al-Yamamah magazine. He has written poetry, criticism, and articles in several local and regional newspapers and magazines. Al-Humaidin has several collections of poetry, with his first collection of poetry being published in 1976 in Saudi Arabia.

== Biography ==
Saad bin Abdullah Al-Humaidin was born in 1947 in Taif. After graduating from high school, he received a diploma from the Teachers Institute with supplementary studies. He worked as a cultural editor in the Al-jazirah weekly newspaper in 1966. Al-Humaidin then became a literary editor for the Al-Riyadh newspaper in 1967. He worked as an editor-in-chief of Al-Yamamah magazine in 1968. He then served as managing editor and general supervisor of culture, and as the chief editor for three years.

In 1983, Al-Humaidin worked as managing editor of Al-Riyadh in its weekly issues. He resigned from the publication in July 2014 to devote himself to reading and writing.

Al-Humaidin's literary contributions include poetry, essays, and criticism in Saudi and Arabic newspapers and magazines. He has a large number of poetry collections printed. His second collection of poems, khaymat 'ant walkhuyut 'ana, was translated in 1977 into English. Some of his poems have been translated into both French and English.

== Poetry ==
Abdullah Abu Haif in his book, Modernism in Saudi Poetry, says,

“Poem Saad Al-Hamidin as a model 2002”. "It is rare to find a study, article, or research in Saudi poetry devoid of a reference or a brief or lengthy analysis of Al-Hamidayn's poetic experience. This experience of modernist poetic work in the Arab Gulf region (referring to the Persian Gulf)”.

Maysoon Abu Bakr said of him,

“In the poetry of the Hamidin there is serious modernity confirmed by the issuance of the first modernist divan in the Kingdom, which was the author of rusum ala alhayit (Drawings on the wall) in the sixties."

== Writings ==
- Khaymat 'Ant Walkhuyut 'Ana (Tent you and strings me), 1986.
- Walilramad Naharatuh, 2000.
- Ghuyum Yabisa, 2007.
- Al'aaemal Alshaeria (Poetic works), 2012.
- Ezif ala Alhuruf, 2019.
