= Saudi law of antiquities museum and urban heritage =

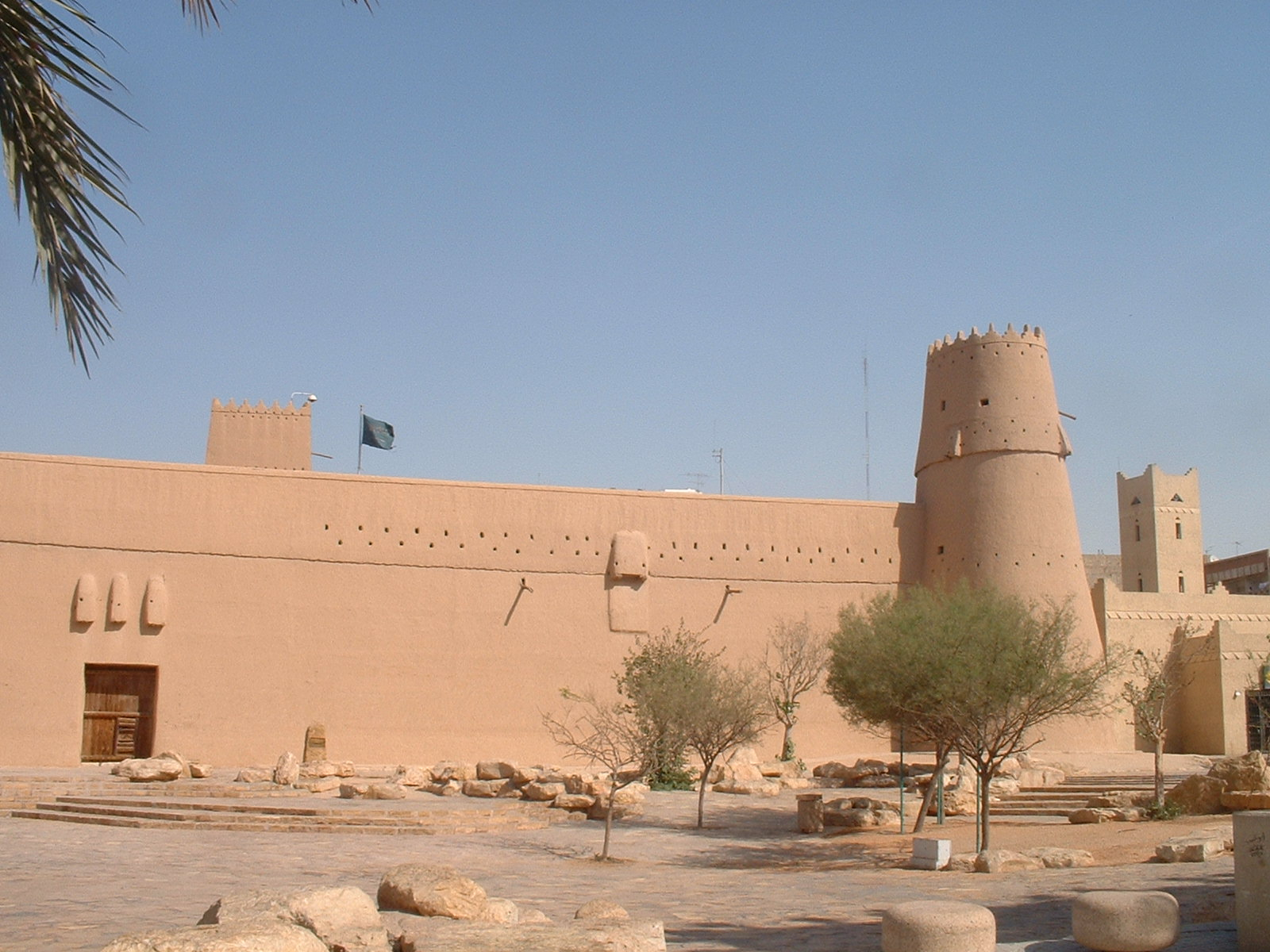
- Founded: 2014
- Location: Saudi Arabia

Saudi Arabia's Law of Antiquities, Museums and Urban Heritage, defines antiquities or archaeological sites as "movable or immovable, buried or submerged objects, which lie within the borders of the Kingdom and in maritime zones under its sovereignty or jurisdiction, which are built, made, produced, adapted, or drawn by man resulting in the formation of archaeological properties throughout the ages, including objects dating back to a recent period, provided they are not less than 100 years old. However, objects which are less than 100 years old may be considered by Saudi Commission for Tourism and Antiquities (SCTA) as antiquities. Antiquities include historical and folk heritage sites and artifacts."

Saudi Arabia views cultural heritage as an essential component of its national identity, treating any loss to this important legacy as a loss of its treasured history. Saudi Arabia began enacting laws in 1964 to safeguard, develop, and preserve cultural heritage.

== Creation and evolution of antiquities law in Saudi Arabia ==
=== Establishment of antiquities department ===
The Saudi government approved the establishment of the Department of Antiquities under the Ministry of Knowledge (Ministry of Education) in January 1964.

=== Antiquities law ===
A Royal Decree on 4 September 1972 approved the Antiquities Law and the formation of the Supreme Council of Antiquities (SCA). The SCA defined the broad scope of the department's activities, supervised its preservation of antiquities and archaeological sites, determined the antiquity of historical relics, buildings, archaeological sites, and ensured the registration of all artifacts.

== Current law ==
The new Saudi Law of Antiquities, Museums, and Urban Heritage was issued by royal decree in 2014, superseding the previous Antiquities Law issued in 1972, and taking into consideration the various developments in this key cultural sector within the last 50 years.

The new law added an international dimension and enhanced existing regulations around artifacts, urban heritage and folk heritage. The regulations set out to improve the identification of visible, buried or submerged artifacts that require safeguarding, to determine the level of preservation for these artifacts and set policies for their preservation, adding regulations to prevent demolition and unlicensed construction works on the sites.

One of the main amendments in this law was the inclusion of stricter penalties in cases of theft, tampering with or causing the deterioration of the artifacts.

== Transfer of the heritage sector to the Ministry of Culture ==
In 2019 the supervision of the National Heritage Sector was transferred from the Saudi General Authority for Tourism and Antiquities to the Ministry of Culture's Heritage Commission after the signing of a memorandum of understanding between the Ministries of Culture and Tourism on 27 March 2019. The executive regulations of the Law of Antiquities, Museums, and Urban Heritage were subsequently merged with those of the Heritage Commission, resulting in the creation of the Executive Regulations for Antiquities and Urban Heritage, which consists of 114 articles and applies to both the Heritage Commission and Museums Commission.
