= Hind al-Mutayri =

Saudi Arabian writer and poet

- Born: Taif, Saudi Arabia
- Education: King Saud University, B.A. in Arabic Language; King Saud University, Ph.D. in Philosophy
- Occupations: Poet; writer; literary critic; professor
- Board member of: Riyadh Literary Club; Al Qassim Literary Club

Hind bint Abd al-Razzaq Huwayl al-Mutayri (Arabic: هند المطيري) is a Saudi poet, writer and academic. She was born and raised in Taif, and it is where she received her education. She obtained a degree in the Arabic Language from King Saud University (1995) and a Ph.D. in Arabic Literature and Criticism from the Department of Arabic Language and Literature. She has participated in events, poetry slams, and readings both locally and internationally. She is also a member of Riyadh Literary Club and has two poetry collections and several critical and literary works.

== Early life ==
al-Mutayri was born and raised in Taif where she developed her interest in poetry and literature. She obtained her degree in the Arabic Language from King Saud University and later pursued a master's and a Ph.D. from the Department of Arabic Language and Literature of the same university. She worked as a teacher at the Ministry of Education to later be transferred to King Saud University, Riyadh, to work as an associate professor at KSU Faculty of Arts.

She is a member of the General Assembly and Poetry House of Riyadh Literary Club. In addition, she is a member of the advisory board of shua’raa wa sha’eraat al-watan (translation: Nation's Poets and Poetesses) poetry group. She was also granted a permanent membership in Al Qassim Literary Club. al-Mutayri participated in educational development programs and cultural programs conducted by the Ministry of Education. In addition to contributing to events, celebrations, poetry readings and arbitration committees since 2004, al-Mutayri has many cultural and literary contributions at various literary clubs, as well as local newspapers, radio and Internet sites.

== Poems ==
al-Mutayri, an Arab nationalist, started her journey writing patriotic poetry, later on, however; she diverted to ghazal poetry. She considers herself the pioneer of feminism poetry in Saudi Arabia. She began writing poetry at an early age, as she was a middle school student at the time. She developed her own style after studying at the Faculty of Arts of King Saud University, in 1995, when she majored in Arabic. Her first works were patriotic poems, since 2000, however; she turned to ghazal poetry. After publishing her first poetry collection, she went on to short story writing.

Published in her poetry collection, Gemini (original: al-Jawzāʼ), which was issued by Riyadh Literary Club, her poem titled Woe to The Tribe (original: Wayḥ al-qabīlah) or The Revolution of the Heart Spring (original: Thawrat al-rabīʻ al-Qalbī), was recited in various clubs around the Kingdom, and at an event in Cairo, Egypt. The poem was also recited at Jeddah International Book Fair in December 2015. This, however, led to her being banned from participating in other cultural events by Mecca Governor, Prince Khalid bin Faisal Al Saud for the next 15 years. The poem was described as a “feminist slur against the restrictions imposed on women within the tribal community,” and it caused many tribal men to demand that she be prosecuted and be forced to give an official apology for addressing tribal traditions. Unapologetic, the poet responded to the attacks with multiple tweets and messages showing her attitude towards stifling tribal practices against women. She wrote the poem after the forced divorce of a tribal woman - Salma - from her husband of 13 years, the father of her five children because he had a non-tribal background and was thus “unsuitable” for tribal norms.

== Awards ==
- 2015: Riyadh Literary Club's prestigious Book of the Year award
- 2015: Women's Excellence Award (Al Qassim)
- 2018: Women's Excellence Award (Al Qassim)

== Works ==
- Negation in The Polemic Poem between al-Jarir and Farazadaq (original: al-nafy fī Naqāʼiḍ Jarīr wa-al-Farazdaq: dirāsah uslūbīyah), Hamad Al Jasser Cultural Center, (ISBN 9786038058282), 2008.
- Hind: A Female with the Spirit of Rain (original: Hind: unthá bi-rūḥ al-maṭar), Dar Al Mufradat Printing and Publishing, (ISBN 9786038058282), 2010.
- Blue Salt Flavored Femininity (original: Unūthah bi-nakʹhat al-milḥ al-azraq), short story collection, (ISBN 9786038058237), 2010.
- Biography of Love: An altruistic Entity (original: Sīrat al-ḥubb: dhāt ghayriyah), (ISBN 9786144047675), 2015.
- Gemini (original: al-Jawzāʼ), poetry collection, Riyadh Literary Club, contains 30 poems, (ISBN 9786038082652), 2016.
- Behind the Burqa are Hot Women: Very Long Tales (original: Khalf al-burquʻ nisāʼ sākhināt: qiṣaṣ ṭawīlah jiddan), Alintishar Al Arabi Foundation, (ISBN 9786144049686), 2016.
- The Antagonist in Brigand Poetry: A Functional Stylistic Study, Taʼabbata Sharran - Al-Shanfara - Urwa ibn al-Ward (original: al-Baṭal al-ḍidd fī shiʿr al-ṣaʿālīk: dirāsah uslūbīyah waẓīfīyah, Taʼabbata Sharran - al-Shanfará - ʿUrwah ibn al-Ward), (ISBN 9786144046654), 2015.
