= Mohammed Al Herz =

Saudi poet and critic (born 1967)

- محمد الحرز
- Born: 1967 (age 58–59); Bahrain
- Occupations: Poet, critic
- Writing career
- Notable works: The Stone and Shadows * A Man Looks Like Me

Mohammed Al Herz (Arabic: محمد الحرز; born 1967) is a Saudi poet and critic, born in Bahrain. He was known for his critical work regarding the Kingdom of Saudi Arabia's cultural landscape and its transformations which followed. He published several collections of poetry and critical writings including (The Stone and Shadows: Poetry and Narration Reading Laboratory) and Diwan (A Man Looks Like Me).

== Work ==
- Member of the Al Ahsa Literary Council.
