= Abdel Mohsin Musellem =

Saudi poet and writer (born 1958)

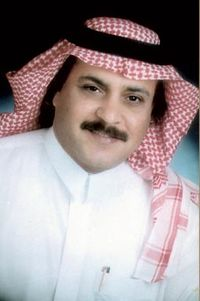
- Musellem in 2016
- Born: 1958 (age 67–68); Medina, Saudi Arabia
- Notable work: Clips from the heart, iilayh

Abdel Mohsin Musellem Abdul Mohsin Bin Halit Bin Abdullah Bin Muhammad Muslim Al-Mahmadi Al-Harbi, is a Saudi poet and writer, and one of the literary elite in the Kingdom. He was born in Medina in 1958. He was raised by his father, the writer Sheikh Helit Muslim, who is one of the nobles in Medina, and a previous imam of the Quba Mosque.

Abdel Mohsin finished his university studies by obtaining a bachelor's degree in public administration from a university in the United States. When he returned to Saudi Arabia in the eighties, he settled in Jeddah to work at Saudi Gazette newspaper which was published in English.

Abdel Mohsin is well known for his outspokenness and his poetry is noted for the direct expression of sentiment on current affairs. He was arrested by the Saudi authorities because of his famous poem "Spoilers On Earth" which was published on the last page of the Saudi newspaper Al-Medina on Sunday, 26 Dhul-Hijjah 1422 AH.

== His poems ==
His famous poems:

- Lady of The World
- Hama: This poem was written during the Hama massacre in Syria, which took place on 2 February 1982 AD.
- Explosion
- A lament for his friend Muhammad Sadiq Diab in a poem written twenty days before his death, while he was accompanying him to London for treatment.

The writer Hamad bin Abdullah Al-Qadi described him as a humble poet, but he glorious when he presents his creativity.
