= Saudi literature =

The emergence of Saudi literature was a natural continuation of the Arabian Peninsula's literary tradition. Soon after the establishment of the Saudi state in the early twentieth century, Saudi literature was born.

The Najdi poet Muhammad bin Abdullah bin Uthaymin, who brought about a renaissance in poetic style, was a prominent pioneer. During the same period, literary figures emerged in Al-Ahsa and Qatif in the eastern part of the Kingdom. The beginning of the Saudi era in the Hijaz (1925) was characterised by widespread production and circulation of texts due to the emergence of a modern literary movement, the availability of printing technology (the first printing press had opened in Makkah in 1883), and the influence of broader Arab literary movements on Saudi writers. These trends led to the 1925 AD publication of the first book in the history of the Kingdom, Mohammed bin Suroor Sabban's Literature of the Hijaz. The following year, the Hijazi Library, the Kingdom of Saudi Arabia's first publishing house, published another book by Mohammed Suroor Sabban titled The Exhibition (Al-Ma’rad). That same year (1926 AD), Muhammad Hassan Awwad published Avowed Thoughts (Khawatir Musarrahah), making him the first Saudi writer to produce an independent literary work. In this period, the dominant literary form was classical poetry. Poets wrote in a variety of genres and used prose as well as verse to examine social and political issues.

According to The Report on the State of Culture in the Kingdom of Saudi Arabia 2024, literary publishing by Saudi authors fluctuated between 2014 and 2024, reaching a peak before declining in the early 2020s. Annual literary output increased from 409 books in 2014 to 701 books in 2022, before falling to 523 books in 2023 and 509 books in 2024, the lowest level recorded since 2018. The report notes that the two-year decline followed a decade-long period of growth and that literary publishing levels in 2024 were lower than those recorded during the COVID-19 pandemic period in 2021. Within overall literary production, novels showed a contrasting trend. The report records a steady rise in the number of novels published by Saudi authors from 161 titles in 2019 to 201 in 2020, followed by a decline to 155 titles in 2021. Output then increased sharply to 208 novels in 2022, dipped to 182 novels in 2023, and rose again to 218 novels in 2024, representing the highest annual number of Saudi novels recorded since 2019 and an increase of nearly 20% compared with the previous year.

== Censorship in Saudi Literature ==
Saudi literary works are subject to pervasive censorship, including the banning of books deemed as taboo or controversial.. While recent liberalizing reforms allowed books previously banned to be displayed at the Riyadh Book Fair, the Ministry of Media still keeps a list of banned works. These include Cities of Salt by Abdul Rahman Munif, works by Mahmoud Darwish and the Harry Potter series. The series was banned due to containing "occult or satanic theme, violence and anti-family" messages.

== See also ==
- List of Saudi Arabian writers
- Libraries in Saudi Arabia
