= Belques Melhem =

Saudi writer

- Born: August 9, 1977 (age 48); Hofuf
- Citizenship: Saudi Arabia
- Occupation(s): poet, novelist, short story writer and school teacher

Belques Muhammad Abdullah Al-Melhem (Arabic: بلقيس محمد عبدالله الملحم; born August 9, 1977) is a Saudi poet and short story writer who was born and raised in Hofuf, Al-Ahsa. She received a BA in Islamic studies from King Faisal University in Dammam. She works as a teacher. She was appointed as an ambassador for free culture in the Arabian Gulf in 2012 from the Naji Noaman Foundation. She has published several collections of short stories, poetry and novels, and has won several local and regional awards.

== Her biography ==
Belques Muhammad Abdullah Al-Melhem was born on Shaaban 24, 1397 / August 9, 1977 in Hofuf, Al- Ahsa. His father is the poet and jurist Muhammad bin Abdullah al-Melhem, encouraged her since she was ten years old. She received her BA in Islamic Studies from King Faisal University in Dammam. She works as a secondary school teacher in Dammam and Saihat. She participated in several festivals and had literary contributions, including the Janadriyah Festival for two consecutive years, 1432–33 AH / 2011–12 AD. She was appointed an Extraordinary Ambassador for Free Culture by the Naji Noaman Foundation for Free Culture on March 29, 2013

In late 2013, blogs, Facebook pages, and even well-known media circulated False news that she was killed by her two brothers, Muhammad and Tariq.

== Her literary career ==
She writes free poetry, short stories and literary articles and is published in many local and Arab newspapers and many websites. She stated about her literary career that "she loved poetry, married the story and gave birth to the novel, and love is only for the first lover.." She wrote articles on a weekly basis in Okaz newspaper for nearly four months and in Shams newspaper for nearly eight months. In her journalistic book, she dealt with general social issues, but she stopped.

She best known for her short story collection, The Widow of Ziryab: Short Stories from Iraq, especially among Iraqi critics, including Najm Abdullah Kazem, "Belques was able to write with an Iraqi pen of affiliation, and her sentences were as simple and not complicated as the politics of war in Iraq and its people, and her characters appeared with a persistently painful tone, in line with the rhythm of life that Iraqis live and the rhythm of death that they die."

== Her personal life ==
She is married and has five children.

== Her prizes ==
- 2012: Naji Noaman International Award for Diwan, may God be pleased with my country, Creativity Award.
- BBC Short Story Award.
- March 2012: The Disappointing Woman Medal from the Arab Intellectual Foundation in Australia.
- November 2018: Al-Multaqa Prize for Arabic Short Story in Kuwait for Do you buy my clothes.

== Her books ==
- The Widow of Ziryab: Short Stories from Iraq, 2008 ( ISBN 9786140206496 )
- The Desired Kingdoms Fire, Novel, 2012
- What the Water Said to the Reed, Poetry Collection, 2012
- The Saint's Napkins, a poetry collection, 2015 ( ISBN 9786140226487 )
- Bigman Who Saw Half of Her Face, Novel, 2015 ( ISBN 9786140117327 )
- Loaf.. Dates.. Iraqi mourning! : Very Short Stories, 2016
- Before Love Extincts, a poetic trilogy with Yahya Al-Samawi and Alwan Hussein, 2017 ( ISBN 9786140226548 )
- Would You Buy My Clothes?: Short Stories from Iraq, 2018

== See also ==
- List of Saudi poets
- Mohammed bin Abdullah Al-Melhem
- Yahya Al-Samawi
