= Najah Al-Masaeed =

Bahraini poet (born 1977)

Najah Al-Masa’eed نجاح بنت حسين بن محمد المساعيد
- Born: 16 October 1977 (age 48); Jordan
- Citizenship: United Arab Emirates
- Education: B.A. of Sociology (Mu'tah University)
- Organization: Honorary member in the “Poets of the Homeland” group
- Known for: Advocate for human rights, peace and justice, author, Arms Trade Treaty, UN Declaration of Commitment to End Sexual Violence in Conflict, UN Resolution 2117
- Spouse: Waleed Al-Sayed Al-Qaddafi (2006-2018-Divorced)

Najah Al-Masa’eed (Arabic: نجاح بنت حسين بن محمد المساعيد born 16 Muhrram 1977) is a Jordanian poet and media figure of a Jordanian descent.

== Early life and education ==
She was born and lived her life in a Bedouin environment in the northeastern region of the Hashemite Kingdom of Jordan. She originally descends from Al-Mulhem Family of the Al-Masa’eed –Al-Shammar tribe. Al-Masaeed grew up with her father in the men's council, listening to their poems and sharing her own poetry with them. She attended elementary school in Umm Al-Jamal and Secondary School in Al-Mafraq Governorate, and has obtained her bachelor's degree in Sociology from Mu'tah University. She was the first girl to attend university in her family.

Her father supported her poetry career early on. In her childhood, Al-Masaeed participated in different events and evenings, as she presented a poem on a national occasion before the King Hussein bin Talal, who asked to meet her after that. The then King praised and encouraged her, and decided to grant her a full scholarship to cover university tuition, as she was struggling to pay for her education. She met the President of the United Arab Emirates, Sheikh Zayed, who offered that she hosts a poetry program on Abu Dhabi Channel. She presented Danat program, and obtained Emirati citizenship in 2005. In 2014, sh was appointed as an honorary member of the "Poets of the Homeland" group, and established her own construction company.

== Family ==
She got married in Jordan on the 22ndof July-2006 and celebrated her marriage in Sirte, Libya to the Libyan businessman, "Walid Al-Sayed", who's the cousin of Muammar Al-Qathafi, and she gave birth to two sons "Jasser" and "Silwan" and left the poetry for a while to devote herself to her family life, but later she got divorced. On the 23rd of Oct, she announced her marriage to a Jordanian officer Amer Rakad Al-Suradi.

== Career ==
She began her career in the field of poetry systems since the Elementary and secondary stages and her first media appearance through Jordanian television celebration on the occasion of King Hussein bin Talal's birthday, may his soul rest in peace, 14th of Nov-1996, the first press appearance as a writer was through the magazine (Khamis night) in Saudi Arabia.

=== Programs she presented ===
- Good morning – Jordan TV
- Songs meanings – art Tarab
- Leilkom Tarab – art Tarab
- Rhythm Melody – art Tarab
- February tent – Kuwait TV and art music
- Abha tent – art Tarab
- Alaa al bal – MBC
- Nasayem leil – MBC
- Danat – Abu Dhabi TV

=== Festivals participated in as an anchor ===
- The Arabic song festival – 2002
- Abha tent -2001
- Hello February tent festival - 2001
- Jerash festival – 2002
- Abha tent – 2002
- The first Ammanian song festival – 2003

=== Poetry collections ===
- One audio collection called "Talking Perfume" that contains fifteen poems - produced by Talah for Artistic Production in Jeddah – 2002.
