= Heritage in Saudi Arabia =

Heritage in Saudi Arabia is diverse due to its geographical location, as it has been a cradle of many ancient kingdoms and civilizations and has long been considered a center of global commerce as various intercontinental trade routes pass through via the Red Sea in the west and the Persian Gulf in the east. These routes include the movement of peoples along the Gulf shores, the seasonal migrations of nomads, and the Hajj.

== Cultural heritage terminology ==
Saudi Arabia uses the norms adopted by global organizations and bodies in defining heritage and classifying it, including what has been mentioned in the 1972 UNESCO Convention concerning the Protection of the World Cultural and Natural Heritage, which considers monuments, groups of buildings, and sites (whether manmade or a composite of nature and human labor) as the components of international cultural heritage. The Law of Antiquities, Museums and Urban Heritage issued by Royal Decree No. M/3 in 2014 also distinguishes between urban heritage and archeological sites. The term Intangible Cultural Heritage, as defined by the 2003 UNESCO Convention for the Safeguarding of Intangible Cultural Heritage, was not as common in Saudi Arabia as the term “popular heritage” or “folk heritage,” which was widely used until 2008 when Saudi Arabia ratified UNESCO's Intangible Cultural Heritage List. This was the starting point for the widespread usage of the term “intangible heritage.” Cultural heritage can be divided into two parts: Tangible Cultural Heritage, which includes monuments, urban heritage, and archeological sites, and Intangible Cultural Heritage, which includes oral arts, literature and expression, performing arts, social practices, rituals and celebrations, traditional arts and artisanship, and knowledge and practices related to nature and the universe.
