= Hasan Abdullah Al-Qurashi =

Saudi Arabian poet, author

- حسن عبدالله القرشي
- Born: 1930s Mecca
- Died: 2004
- Education: Saudi Educational Institute
- Occupation: Poet. Diplomat
- Writing career
- Language: Arabic
- Notable works: Colorful Smiles, The Curtains of Rain

Hasan Abdullah Al-Qurashi (Arabic: حسن بن عبد الله القرشي; 1930s–2004) was a Saudi Arabian poet, author, and diplomat, born in Mecca.

He completed his bachelor's degree in literature at the Saudi Educational Institute, and an honorary doctorate from the University of Arizona.

Al-Qurashi was known to be involved in the fields of literature, culture, and media along with his diplomatic works all together, making him a "litterateur diplomat".

His published collections of poetries include Colourful Smiles (1949) and The Curtains of Rain (1997), his first and final poetical works.

Al-Qurashi died in 2004, in his seventies.

== Career ==
Al-Qurashi was classified among the poets of the second generation, in addition to one the leaders of contemporary literary movement, where he often leaned into writing free verse rather than rhyming poems.

His works have been translated into a number of languages including:

- French
- English
- Spanish
- Chinese
- Persian
- Italian
- Greek

Moreover, it was said that he gained his knowledge from the Arab literary movements of Apollo and Mahjar.

Al-Qurashi also wrote for a number of class magazines including Arrisalah, Al-Adeeb, and the Writers, and gave lectures at several Saudi Arabian and Arab universities.

Asides from poetry, Al-Qurashi also worked in storytelling, critique, radio, and television; he was the chief of radio staff in Saudi Arabia's Broadcasting Services, and he was commissioned to work in Cairo Radio for more than a year. And throughout his diplomatic career, he held several positions at the ministries of finance and exterior, where he was chief of commissioner in the second one.

Also, he held the titles of "extraordinary ambassador" and "bureau ambassador", and was the Saudi Arabian ambassador in Sudan, Mauritania, and later on in the ministry of exterior.

Furthermore, he represented Saudi Arabia in a number of festivals and literary conferences held in several cities including:

- Tunis
- Baghdad
- Western Tripoli
- Beirut
- Rabat
- Taipei
- Roma
- Palermo
- Dhaka
- Kuala Lumpur
- Cairo

== Al-Qurashi's Memberships ==
- Member of the Arabic Language Academy in Egypt and Jordan
- Member of the Writers' Association in Sudan

== List of Publications ==
Faris Bani Abs (Literary Study)	Colourful Smiles	The Convoys of Memories
The Lost Yesterday	Susanne	The Suicidal Tunes
Blood Call	The Blue Melody	The Lake of Thirst
Tomorrow Won't be Lost	The Jam of Nostalgia	Thorns and Roses (Critique)
Love in the Dark (Critique)	The Sounds of a Canal	

== Reviews ==
Abdel Ilah Jad'a finds that Al-Qurashi's poetry reflects psychological and emotional reactions through the language used which portrays a lively image of what Al-Qurashi is referring to, which gives him the ability to express his feelings openly.
