= Siba'i Uthman =

Saudi Arabian journalist

Siba'i Ahmad Uthman (Arabic: أحمد السباعي; born 1938) is a Saudi journalist, author and short story writer. He was born in 1938 in the Sudan and studied at the College of Arts in Khartoum before commencing a career in journalism. Among Uthman's works are several volumes of short stories including Silence and the Walls and Circles in the Book of Time. His short story Silence and the Walls appeared in English translation in a 1988 anthology of Arabian literature edited by Salma Khadra Jayyusi.

== Literary career ==
He was a publisher for Al Nadwa (newspaper) newspaper and founded Quraish Press. Uthman founded the first theatre in Mecca, the Dar Quraish for Islamic Narrative Drama.
