= Raed Al-Jishi =

Saudi poet and translator

- رائد الجشي
- Born: 1976 (age 49–50); Al-Qatif governorate
- Education: Bachelor degree in chemistry
- Alma mater: King Faisal University
- Title: Writer, poet, translator

Raed Al-Jishi (Arabic: رائد الجشي) a poet and a translator from Saudi Arabia. He was born in Al-Qatif Governorate in 1396 AH. He published books that vary between poetry, novel and literary translations. His poems have been translated into English, Italian, French, and other languages. Some of his notable works are the novel (Gulf Snake) and Diwan (Fragments of Love). He won several literary prizes, including the Golden Cup award for the best poetry book translated into Italian, in the (Citta del Galletto – Fifth Edition) competition in southern Italy in 2018.

== Education ==
- He obtained a bachelor's degree in chemistry from King Faisal University.

== Career ==
- He works as a chemistry teacher.
- He was chosen from Changhua University in Taiwan to be a member of the international advisory committee overseeing the university's education plan in the literary department in 2018.
- He participated in the judging of the Tulliola Renato Filippelli Italian Prize for World Poetry at its twenty-fifth session in 2019.

== Works ==
- (Suicidal Coronets). (original text: tawayijat muntahara) Issued in 2003.
- (Remnants of a mug) (original text: bqaya qadah) Poetry collection. Issued by Al-Balagh Foundation in Beirut in 2006.
- (Dream) (original text: hulm) poetry collection. Issued by Dar Al-Kifah in 2008.
- The novel (Gulf Snake) (original text: 'afeaa alkhalij) was published by Dar Al Khayal in 2008.
- The poem (Fragments of love) (original text: sha'dhaya eishq). Issued by the Eastern Region Literary Club in 2009.
- The poem (But it is the sun) (original text: walikunah alshams). Issued by Dar Al-Mahajah Al-Bayda in 2010.
- (Neighbors Down the Stairs) (original text: jiran 'asfal aldaraj) Contemporary texts from Dutch literature. Issued by Atyaf Publishing House in 2013.
- (Bleeding Gull: Look, Feel, Fly) published in 2014.
- (Composition for the memory of love) (original text: takwin lidhakirat alhuaa) Poetry collection. Issued by Atyaf Publishing House in 2015. This Diwan was translated into French, and into English.
- (Clay tablets in Nietzsche's cave) (original text: 'alwah altiyn fi kahf nytishih) Issued by Atiaf Publishing and the Arab House of Science in 2017.
- (Iowa River: Texts from Contemporary International Poetry) (original text: nahr 'ayuu: nusus min alshier alduwalii almueasir) published by Dar Masaa in 2017.
- (The Bloody Seagull) (original text: alnuwris alddami) was published in the Italian language.
- (Your Voice in the Side Music) (original text: sawtik fi almusiqaa aljanibia) [translation] by Italian poet Claudia Pigno. Issued by Dar Rawashen in 2019.
- (Where the sky tracks) (original text: hayth tatie alsama') [translation] by the Vietnamese writer Mai Mae Fan.

== Awards ==
- Received the award for the best poetry translated into Italian in 2018 for his poem (The Bloody Seagull).
- He was honored in the literary council of Saud Al-Faraj in 2019.
