= Ahmad al-Hilali =

- أحمد الهلالي
- Born: 1974 (age 51–52); Saudi Arabia
- Education: Bachelor's degree Master's degree Doctorate degree
- Alma mater: Taif University
- Occupation: Member of the teaching staff at Taif University Member of the Board of Directors of Taif Literary Club
- Notable work: The novel (Sidrat al-Muntaha)
- Title: Writer
- Website: Official Website

Ahmad al-Hilali (Arabic: آحمد الهلالي) is a Saudi writer, born in Halat Ammar in the Tabuk in 1974. He has works as a writer in the Makkah newspaper, and has published many literary and critical books. One of the most notable novels he published is Sidra al-Muntaha, and a book entitled Literary clubs: emergence and development, and the impact of creating cultural awareness.

== Education ==
In middle school, Al-Hilali studied at Al Zubair bin Al Awam School in Umm Al Hatab and later attended Al Razi School in Adham. He completed his high school education at Al Faisal School in Jeddah.

He obtained a bachelor's degree from King Abdulaziz University in Jeddah, a master's degree from Taif University, and a doctorate in literature and rhetoric from the Islamic University of Madinah in 2016. The subject of his dissertation was Light and Darkness in Saudi Poetry.

== Career ==
Al-Hilali has been a member of the teaching staff at Taif University since 1436 AH (2014 CE). He is also a member of the Board of Directors of the Taif Literary Club and serves as an administrative official at the club. Additionally, he is the head of the Farqad Creative Group.

== Works ==
- (The Raven in Pre-Islamic Poetry) (original text: alghurab fi alshier aljahilii) was published by Al-Taif Literary Club in 2013.
- Diwan (lung flicker) (original text: rafif ria) issued by Al-Baha Literary Club in 2013.
- The novel (Sidrat al-Muntaha). Issued by the Literary Club of Hail and the House of Words in 2015.
- (Literary clubs: emergence and development, and the impact of creating cultural awareness) (original text: al'andia al'adbia: alnash'a waltatawur, wal'athar fi tashkil alwaey althaqafii) published by the Makkah Literary Club and the Arab Expansion Foundation in 2015.
- (Diwan Luqit bin Zarara and his daughter Dakhtnos) [investigation]. It was published in the Arab Magazine book series in 2015.
- Diwan (the thinnest shades) (original text: 'araq al'dhilal). Issued by the Abha Literary Club and the Arab Diffusion Foundation in 2016.
- (Light and Darkness in Saudi Poetry) (original text: alnuwr wal'dhalam fi alshier alsaeudii) was published by the Jeddah Literary Club and the Arab Diffusion Foundation in 2016.

== Lectures and poetry evenings ==
- A poetry evening organized by the Al-Baha Literary Club in 2013 with the participation of the poet Rashid Al-Qathami.
- A poetry evening organized by the Abqar Forum at the Jeddah Literary Club in 2016, with the participation of the poet Latifa Qari.
- (The Saudi poet’s awareness of intellectual security) A paper he delivered at the Fifth Saudi Writers Conference in 2016.
- A story evening organized by Jeddah Literary Club in 2017 about Al-Hilali's literary experience in writing novels and poetries.
- Lecture (Dialogue as a Culture) King Abdulaziz Center for National Dialogue in cooperation with the Literary and Cultural Club in Taif in 2020.
