= William L. Ochsenwald =

American historian

William Ochsenwald

Academic background
- Education: University of Chicago (PhD)

Academic work
- Discipline: History
- Sub-discipline: Unification of Saudi Arabia; Dissolution of the Ottoman Empire; Arab Muslims; History of Palestine
- Institutions: Virginia Tech

William L. Ochsenwald is an American historian and Emeritus Professor of History at Virginia Tech. He was awarded his PhD from the University of Chicago in 1971. Ochsenwald specializes in the history of the Middle East, particularly the unification of Saudi Arabia and dissolution of the Ottoman Empire. Ochsenwald has also written on Arab Muslims and the History of Palestine.

He is a regular contributor to Encyclopædia Britannica. Ochsenwald was interviewed for the 2006 documentary video Armenian Revolt, which also features David Fromkin, Norman Stone, and others.

== Works ==
- The Middle East: A History, 7th edition (McGraw-Hill, 2011)
- Ochsenwald, William (1984). Religion, society, and the state in Arabia : the Hijaz under Ottoman control, 1840-1908. Columbus : Ohio State University Press.
- Ochsenwald, William. 1980. The Hijaz Railroad. Charlottesville: University Press of Virginia.
