= Weam Al Dakheel =

Saudi Arabian TV presenter

Weam Al Dakheel, also Aldakeel, (Arabic: وئام الدخيل) is a Saudi Arabian journalist and television presenter. After Jumanah Al Shami became the first woman to present the morning television news in Saudi Arabia in 2016, in September 2018 Al Dakheel featured on Saudi TV's Channel 1 as the first woman to act as an anchor for the main evening news broadcast, appearing side-by-side with Omas Al Nashwan. Since January 2018, her official job title at the Saudi Broadcasting Authority has been operations manager.

== Biography ==
Born in Morocco, Al Dakheel is raised in Jeddah, studied in Lebanon, live in Riyadh, and graduated with a BA in journalism from the Lebanese American University in 2011. At the same university, she attended a course at the Institute for Women’s Studies in the Arab World, receiving a diploma in Gender in Development and Humanitarian Assistance in 2017. In addition, she has trained as a television presenter at the Focus Academy and at the Al Jazeera Media Training Center.

After working for CNBC Arabiya from 2012, she became a news reader for the Al-Arab News Channel in Bahrain.(2014–17). In January 2018, she was appointed operations manager for the Saudi Broadcasting Authority. Her first appearance as a news anchor was on the 9.30 pm Channel One news programme on 20 September.

Al Dakheel's appearance as a news anchor seems to be in line with the Saudi Vision 2030 initiative launched by Crown Prince Mohammad bin Salman. It has already resulted in allowing women to drive cars and to take on employment. Vogue reported that her appearance as a news presenter was "widely lauded on social media".
