= Nawwaf bin Talal Al Rashid =

Saudi-origin Qatari national and royal

- Born: 8 October 1989 (age 36)
Names
- Nawwaf bin Talal bin Abdulaziz Al Rashid
- House: Rashidi dynasty
- Father: Talal bin Abdulaziz Al Rashid

Nawwaf bin Talal Al Rashid (Arabic: نواف بن طلال الرشيد; born 8 October 1989) is a dual Saudi-Qatari national, poet and a member of the Al Rashid family. He was arrested in Kuwait on 12 May 2018 and extradited to Saudi Arabia. He was detained there until 1 April 2019 when he was released.

== Biography ==
His father is Talal bin Abdulaziz who was a poet and grandson of Saud bin Abdulaziz Al Rashid a ruler of Ha'il at the beginning of the 20th century. Talal bin Abdulaziz died in Algeria in 2003 when he was on a camping trip. During the incident Nawwaf was with his father. His mother is a Qatari, and following the death of his father Nawwaf settled in Doha, Qatar, and gained Qatari nationality. He is a distant cousin of Madawi Al Rashid, a British scholar.

On 12 May 2018 during his visit to Kuwait Nawwaf, aged 29, was arrested there by National Security forces and deported to Saudi Arabia on the request of the Saudi authorities. Nawwaf bin Talal had been invited by Kuwaiti poet Abdelkarim Al Jabari who is a member of the Shammar tribe which the Al Rashids also part of, to join an activity organized in his honour. Human Rights Watch considered his arrest and deportation as another example of Saudi Crown Prince Mohammed bin Salman's human rights abuses. Before his deportation to Saudi Arabia Nawwaf was a student at Qatar University.

In late March 2019 Nawwaf bin Talal was released by the Saudi after ten months in arbitrary detention.
