= Mutlaq Hamid Al-Otaibi =

Poet and writer

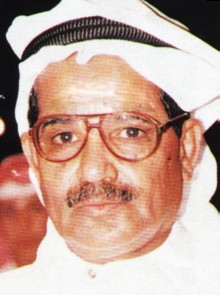
- Born: September 9, 1937; Taif, Saudi Arabia
- Died: July 31, 1995 (aged 57); United States
- Occupation(s): Poet, writer

Mutlaq Hamid Al-Thubeiti Al-Otaibi (Arabic: مطلق حميد الثبيتي العتيبي) (September 9, 1937 – July 31, 1995) was a Saudi Arabian writer and poet., and he was a member of the faculty of sharia at the University of Umm al-Qura. and he was the President of the Scientific Research Ministry of Higher Education in Saudi Arabia, he is considered by many as one of the greatest Saudi poets of all times.

== Life ==
Al-Thubeiti was born Mutlaq Hamid Al-Thubeiti Al-Otaibi in Taif On September 9, 1937, in 1965 he graduated from the faculty of Sharia Islamic Studies in Mecca, in 1967 he traveled to the United Kingdom where he studied English at the university of manchester, He returned to Saudi Arabia in the 1970s where he got many jobs including member of the faculty of sharia at the University of Umm al-Qura in Mecca. Al-Thubeiti died on July 31, 1995, during his treatment in United States.

== Books ==
- (Arabic: جروح الامس) (The wounds of yesterday)

== His Jobs ==
- Member of Faculty of Shari'a at the University of Umm Al-Qura,
- Secretary of Al-Dayra Magazine issued by the King Abdul Aziz in Riyadh
- Cultural attaché, Embassy of Saudi Arabia in Sudan
- President of the Scientific Research Ministry of Higher Education
