= Hejaz Vilayet =

Province of the Ottoman Empire from 1517 to 1916

Vilayet of the Hejaz ولاية الحجاز (Arabic) ولايت حجاز (Ottoman Turkish)
- Vilayet of the Ottoman Empire
- 1517–1916
- Flag

- The Hejaz Vilayet in 1900
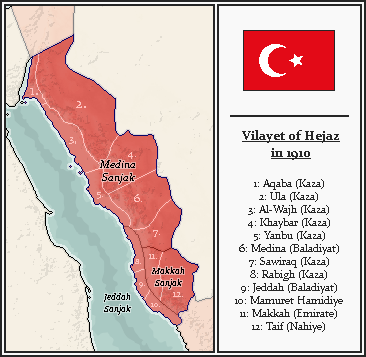
- the Vilayet's subdivisions in 1910
- Capital: Mecca; Taif (summer residence)
- Demonym: Hejazi
- Area
  - 1914: 250,000 km^{2} (97,000 sq mi)
- Population
  - 1914: 300,000
- History
  - Vilayet Law: 1517
  - Hejaz railway: 1908
  - Arab Revolt: 1916
Preceded by	Succeeded by
Habesh Eyalet; Mamluk Sultanate	Kingdom of Hejaz
- Today part of: Saudi Arabia; Jordan

The Vilayet of the Hejaz (Arabic: ولاية الحجاز, romanized: Wilāyat al-Ḥijāz; Ottoman Turkish: ولايت حجاز, romanized: Vilâyet-i Hicaz) refers to the coastal region of Arabia when it was administered as a first-level province (vilayet) of the Ottoman Empire. At the beginning of the 20th century, it reportedly had an area of 96,500 square miles (250,000 km^{2}). The Hejaz included all land from the southern border of the Vilayet of Syria, south of the city of Ma‛an, to the northern border of the Vilayet of Yemen, north of the city of Al Lith.

Despite its lack of natural resources, the region had great political importance as the cradle of Islam and was a source of legitimacy for the Ottomans' rule. Subsidies provided by the state and zakat were the main source of income for the population of the two holy cities, but trade generated by the hajj was also an important source of revenue.

The Ottoman regular force in Hejaz was constituted as a fırka (division), attached to the Seventh Army in Yemen. Outside of cities and towns, Ottoman authority was weak. Only Medina and Jeddah had permanent garrisons.

== History ==
=== Background ===
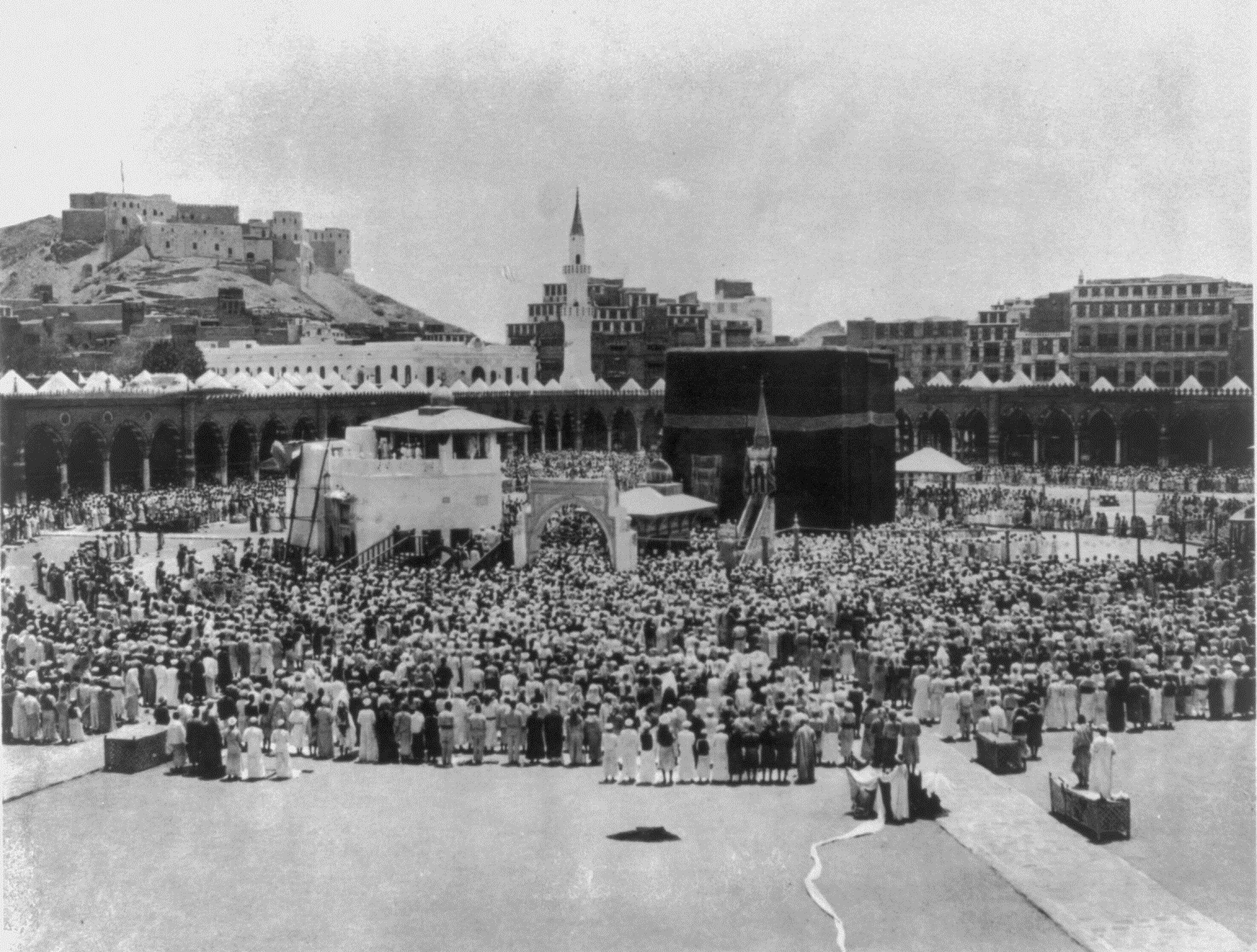
The Kaaba in Mecca, 1889

Sultan Selim I defeated the Mamluk Sultanate in 1517 and took over Egypt. The Hejaz was at the time, a Mamluk suzerainty and had relied on Egypt for grain imports, it was also under threat from an aggressive Portuguese navy in the Red Sea. As a result, the emir of Mecca at the time, Berekat ibn Muhammed Haseni, sent his 12-year-old son, Muhammad (future "Ebu-Numey"), to Egypt and pledged their allegiance to the Ottoman Sultan, along with the key to Mecca. The Sultan allowed the emir of Mecca to remain in power in exchange for loyalty to the Sultan. To strengthen the Sultan's legitimacy in Hejaz and in the Muslim world, the Sultan adopted the title Custodian of the Two Holy Mosques. Initially, the Ottomans administered the Hejaz under the Eyalet of Egypt. The Sharif of Mecca represented imperial authority in the region. Administration later fell to the Governors of Jeddah, and the Eyalet of Jeddah was later transformed into the Hejaz Vilayet, with a governor in Mecca.

=== Saudi conquest ===
Since the 1750s, Wahabi Muslims, a puritanical sect from the Najd region backed by the influential Al Saud family, began to pose a threat to the stability of the Hejaz. In 1801, while the Ottoman Porte's attention was diverted to the French invasion of Egypt, the Wahhabis overpowered local Hejazi defences and captured the holy cities. Şerif Pasha, the governor of Jeddah, temporarily wrestled Mecca back from the Wahhabis but was finally defeated in 1806. The Wahhabis imposed their strict religious doctrines in the holy cities; the mentioning of the Sultan was forbidden during Friday sermons, officials from the four madhabs (schools of Islamic jurisprudence) were dismissed and replaced with Wahabbis. In early 1807, the leader of the Wahhabi army Ibn Saud ordered the expulsion of all pilgrims and troops loyal to the Emir of Mecca, looting of the city later followed. It was alleged that Ibn Saud banned pilgrim caravans that were accompanied with trumpets and drums, which were contrary to Wahhabi doctrines.

The Ottoman government found itself unable to confront the Wahhabis, and gave the task of defeating them to the powerful Muhammad Ali Pasha of Egypt in 1809–1810. Muhammad Ali Pasha dispatched an army commanded by his son Tusun Pasha in 1811, and successfully retook Medina and Mecca in 1812 and 1813 respectively. Tusun Pasha died of disease during the campaign and was replaced by his younger brother, Ibrahim Pasha, who continued the campaign into the Najd, with the war ending only in September 1818, with the defeat and dissolution of what was known as the First Saudi State. From 1818 to 1845, the region would be administered by Egypt, until Muhammad Ali was forced to restore Hejaz to the Sultan as a result of the Second Turko-Egyptian War. Osman Pasha was then appointed to the Governorship of the Hejaz. The borders of the province were redefined better, and the Emirate of Mecca was restored.

=== Vilayet period ===
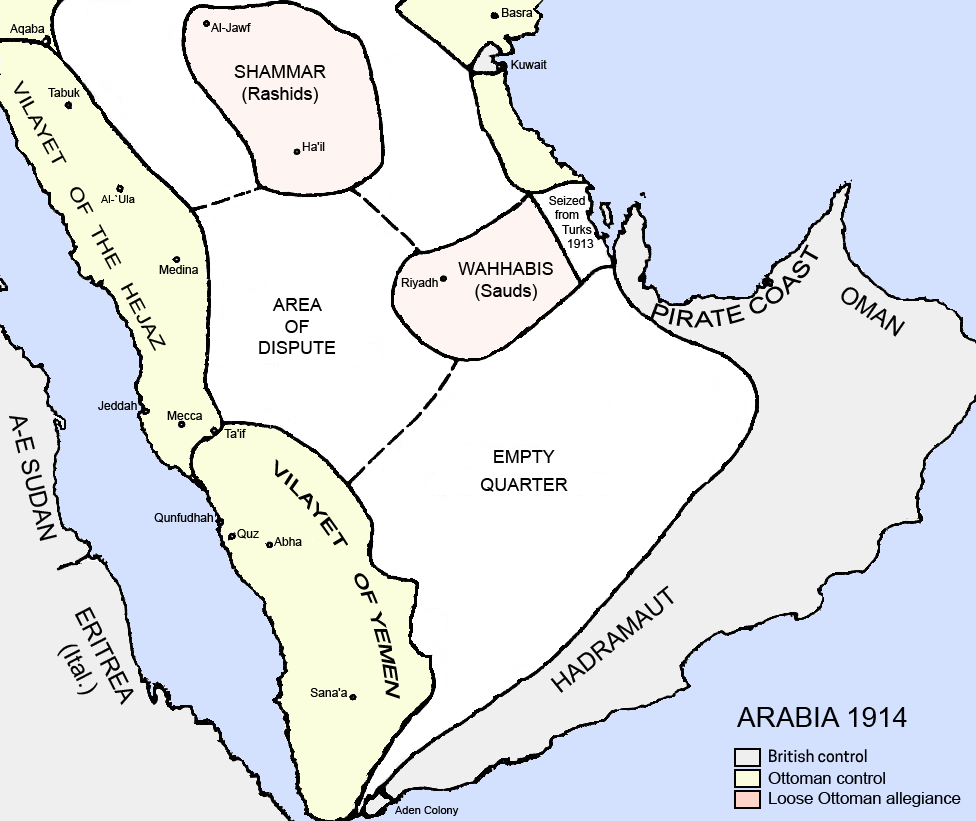
The Arabian peninsula in 1914

In the late 1860s, a commission was sent to the Hejaz to reorganize the province, and the following decades saw the introduction of administrative reforms. Hejaz was reorganized as a vilayet in 1872 according to the Vilayet Law of 1864. The province was divided into sanjaks, kazas and nahiyes. Mecca became the center of the vilayet, with Medina and Jeddah as sanjaks. The administrative structure of the Hejaz was reformed, but some changes enacted in the rest of the Empire were not implemented here.

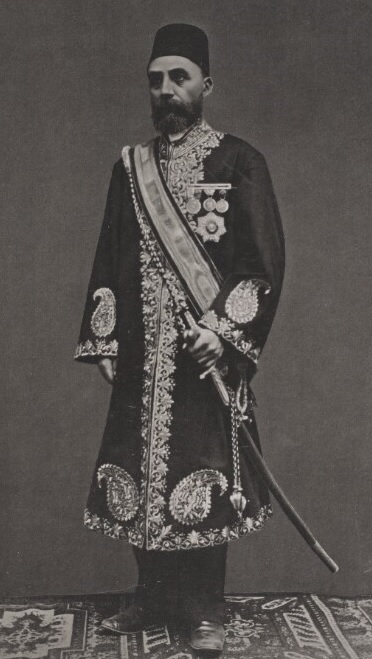
Osman Pasha, Governor of Hejaz from 1882 to 1886

The towns of Mecca and Medina were exempted from paying taxes and in fact, were given subsidies, called surre, from the Ottoman treasury that was to be distributed to the poor in Mecca and Medina. The Hejaz region first received subvention in the reign of the Abbasid caliph Al-Muqtadir in the tenth century, afterwards it became customary for other caliphs and sultans to send these subsidies. However, aside from residents of Mecca and Medina, the inhabitants of other towns and villages did not benefit as much. Subsidies were also paid to notable nomadic shaikhs, who had the potential to disrupt the passage of pilgrims in the region. The entire province was also exempted from military service; attempts to overturn this exemption were blocked by the Sharif of Mecca.

The Ottomans maintained a garrison force of 7,000 soldiers under the command of officers, in addition to the Sharif's own personal guard of 500. Proper garrisons were stationed at the towns of Mecca and Medina whereas pocket garrisons were kept in Jeddah, Yanbu and Ta'if- all of which were alongside the strategic Hejaz Railway. Besides these settlements, roads and other infrastructure were not under Ottoman control - the roads to Yanbu from Medina required strong escorts and the Mecca-Medina railway route was regularly closed by tribesmen who demanded payment for passage - highway robbery and murder were common on these roads.

The Ottomans completed the Hejaz Railway, linking Damascus to Medina, in 1908, but the railway was severely damaged during World War I and later abandoned. In 1916, as a result of the McMahon–Hussein Correspondence, Sharif Hussein ibn Ali declared himself King of the Hejaz.

== Demographics ==
The exact population of the Hejaz is impossible to determine, particularly because of the mobility of Bedouins and pilgrims, and also because of the inability of Ottoman authorities to conduct a census in Arabia. The population for the vilayet is given by the 1885 Ottoman census as 3,500,000. According to William L. Ochsenwald, the actual population of the Hejaz including the Asir at the end of the 19th century ranged from 400,000 to 800,000.

Most of the population was not settled, and included nomads and semi-nomads making a livelihood from stock-breeding. Bedouin tribes dominated the region, and Ottoman control over them was mostly indirect, appointing governors to Medina and Jeddah but allowing local rule elsewhere.

== Economy ==
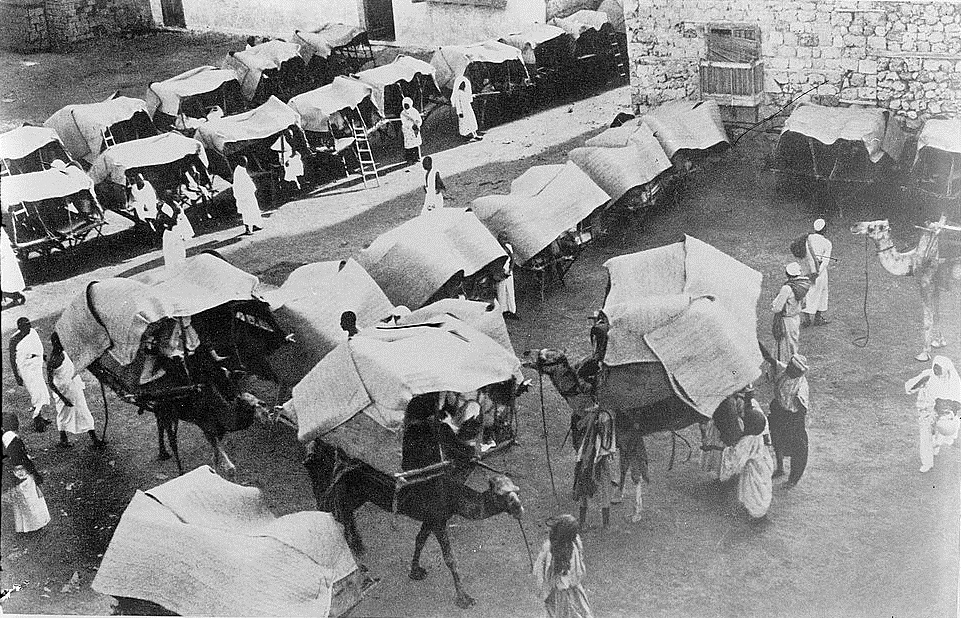
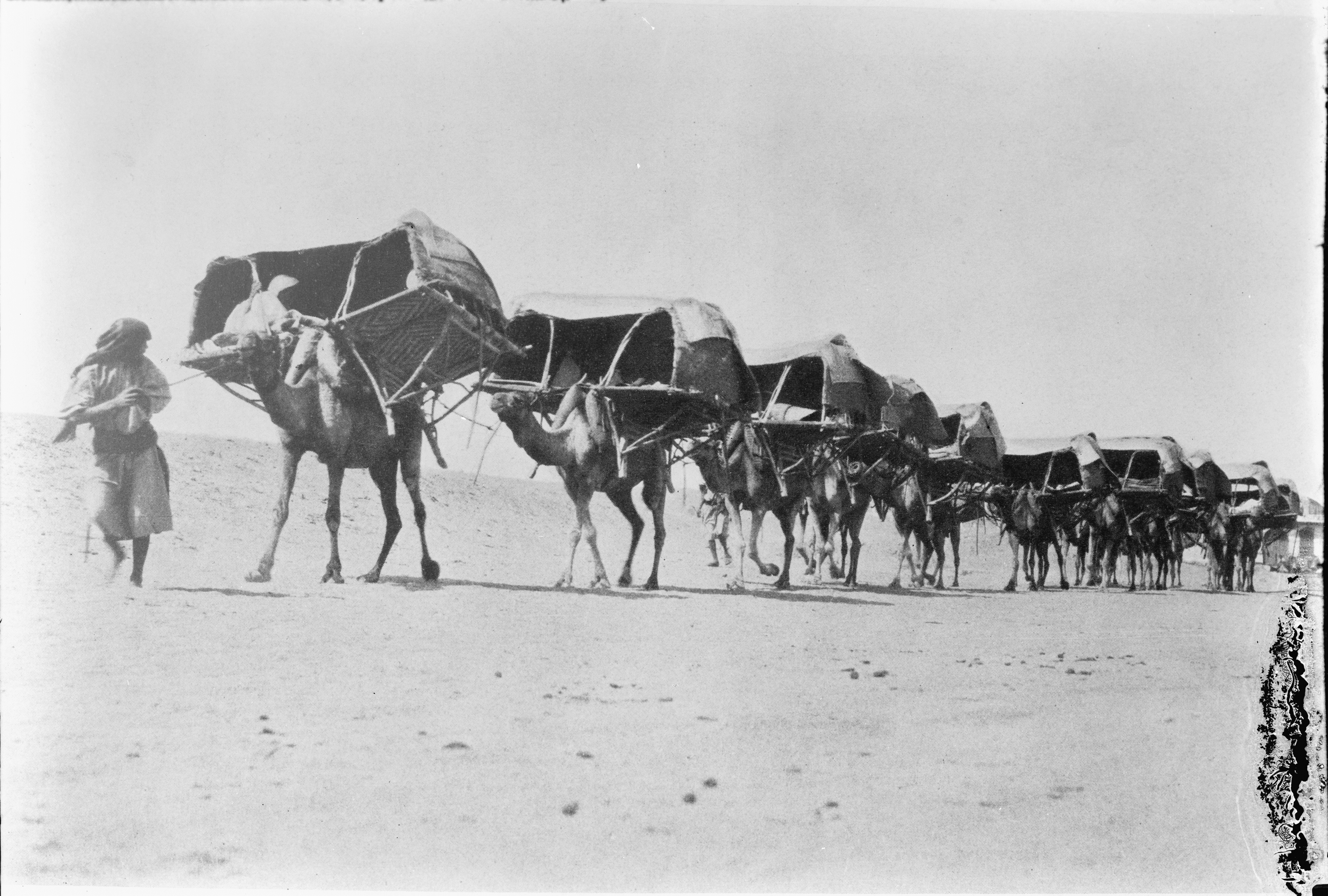
Pilgrims often traveled in caravans, where a large number of Hejazis worked in, as seen here in 1910. The economy of Hejaz relied heavily on the Hajj.

The economy of the vilayet relied heavily on the annual Hajj and pilgrimage, where Muslims from all over the world travel to the cities of Mecca and Medina. The importance of the pilgrimage was such that a majority of townspeople, especially residents of Mecca and Medina, relied on windfall from the pilgrimages for daily sustenance. Many residents worked as guides for pilgrims, camel-brokers, built and provided pilgrim accommodations, sold or distributed Zamzam water. Others worked in the maintenance of the Masjid al-Haram and the Masjid al-Nabawi as sweepers, doorkeepers, servants, prayer leaders, preachers or candle-cleaners. Of these occupations, the most numerous were the pilgrimage guides. These guides had the task of organising the pilgrim's accommodation, transportation, acting as a translator and generally guiding the pilgrim through the rituals and prayers required. Aside from payment from a pilgrim, the guide would also be able to make any transactions in the name of the pilgrim.

Hejaz's primary exports were dates, henna, hides, Meccan balsam, gum, nacre and Zamzam water. As there are few natural resources in the region, the vast majority of products had to be imported, a practice that continued until the early twentieth century.

The mercantile centre of the region was the port city of Jeddah, which was the principal port of the Red Sea. As the port lay on the coffee trade route from Yemen and the trade route from India, ships from Arabia, India, Africa and southern Europe regularly passed through the port, with a majority of European merchants setting up offices in the port. Customs duties collected at the port were another source of income for both the vilayet and the Emirate of Mecca. The opening of the Suez Canal in 1869 had a negative impact on trading in Jeddah because steamships could dock at smaller ports such as Yenbo on the Red Sea coastline.

Due to the region's intense heat and scarcity of rainfall, the Hejaz could not support an agriculture-based economy. Agriculture was only possible in oases and on the irrigated outskirts of major towns, with dates being the primary crop grown. Semi-nomadic tribes would also engage in agriculture or would herd sheep and camels.

== Administrative divisions ==
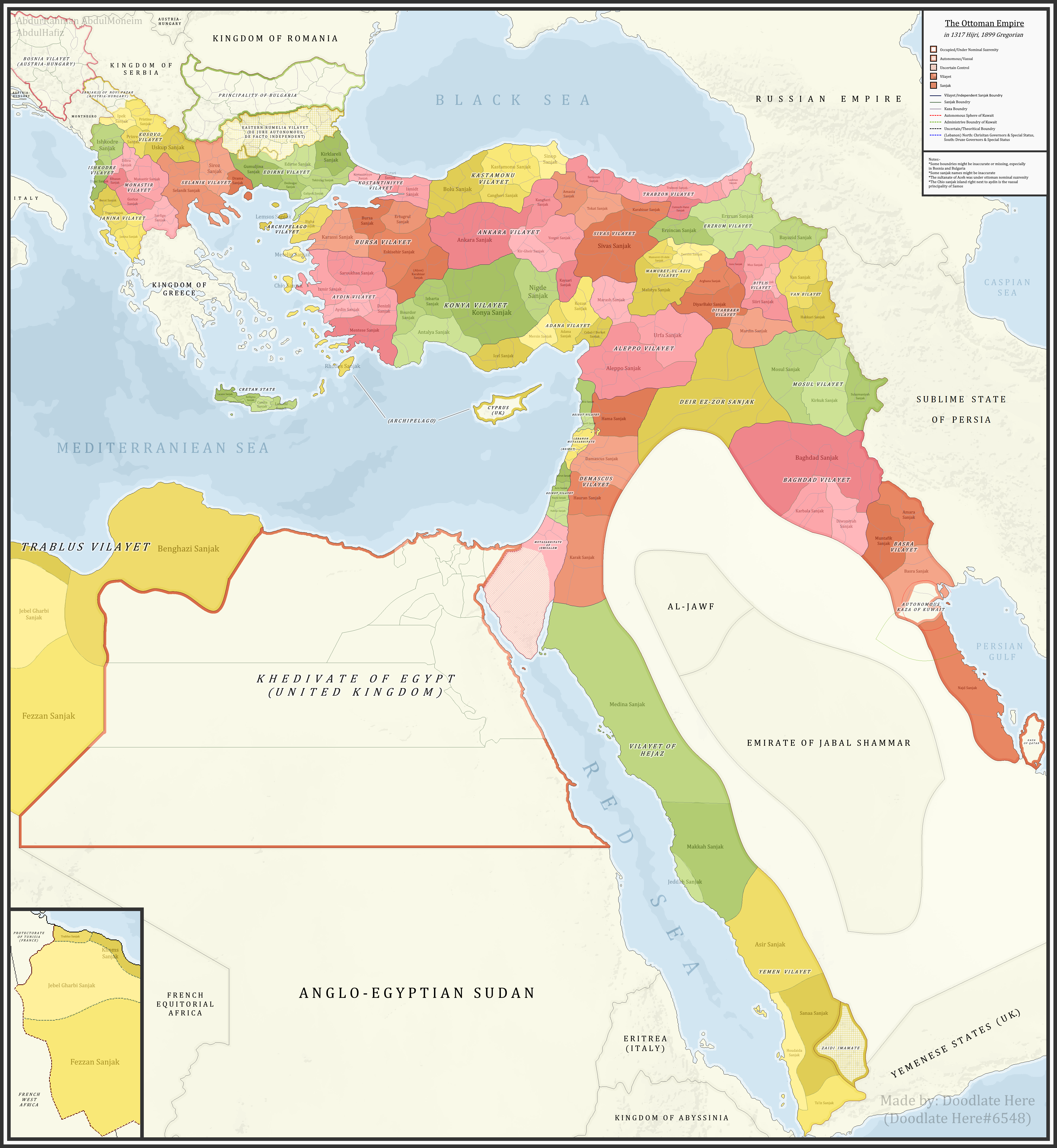
A map showing the administrative divisions of the Ottoman Empire in 1317 Hijri, 1899 Gregorian, Including the Vilayet of Hijaz and it's Sanjaks

Sanjaks of the Vilayet:

1. Sanjak of Mecca (Makkah al-Mukarramah)
2. Sanjak of Medina (al-Madinah al-Munawwarah); became an independent sanjak in the summer of 1910.
3. Sanjak of Jeddah

== See also ==
- Sharifate of Mecca
- Anglo-Ottoman Convention of 1913
