= Hamza Shehata =

Hamza Shehata (Arabic: حمزة شحاتة; 1910/11-1971/72) was a philosopher, poet and civic leader from the Hejaz in the western part of modern Saudi Arabia. The eccentric Hejazi genius was born in Mecca and raised in Jeddah. He studied at the Al-Falah School (established in 1905), then moved to India where he worked at the Zainal trading house for a number of years. Upon his return, he joined the Jeddah Council of Commerce.

He was influenced by key social and political leaders in the Hejaz such as Qassim Zainal and Mohammed Suroor Sabban. His literary work was influenced by, among others, Khalil Gibran, Iliyya Abu Madi and Mikha'il Na'ima.

== Notable works ==
- Al-Rojollah 'Imad Al-Kholoqu Al-Fadil (speech on ethics)
- Rifat Akkl (work on ethics)
- Himar Hamzah Shihatta (work on ethics, religion and social reform)
- Diwan Hamzah Shihatta (complete poems)
- Ghadat Bulaqu (poetry)
- Eila Ibbnaty Sheiren (romantic literature; letters to his daughter in Jeddah)
