= Ministry of Tourism (Saudi Arabia) =

Government ministry of Saudi Arabia

- وزارة السياحة

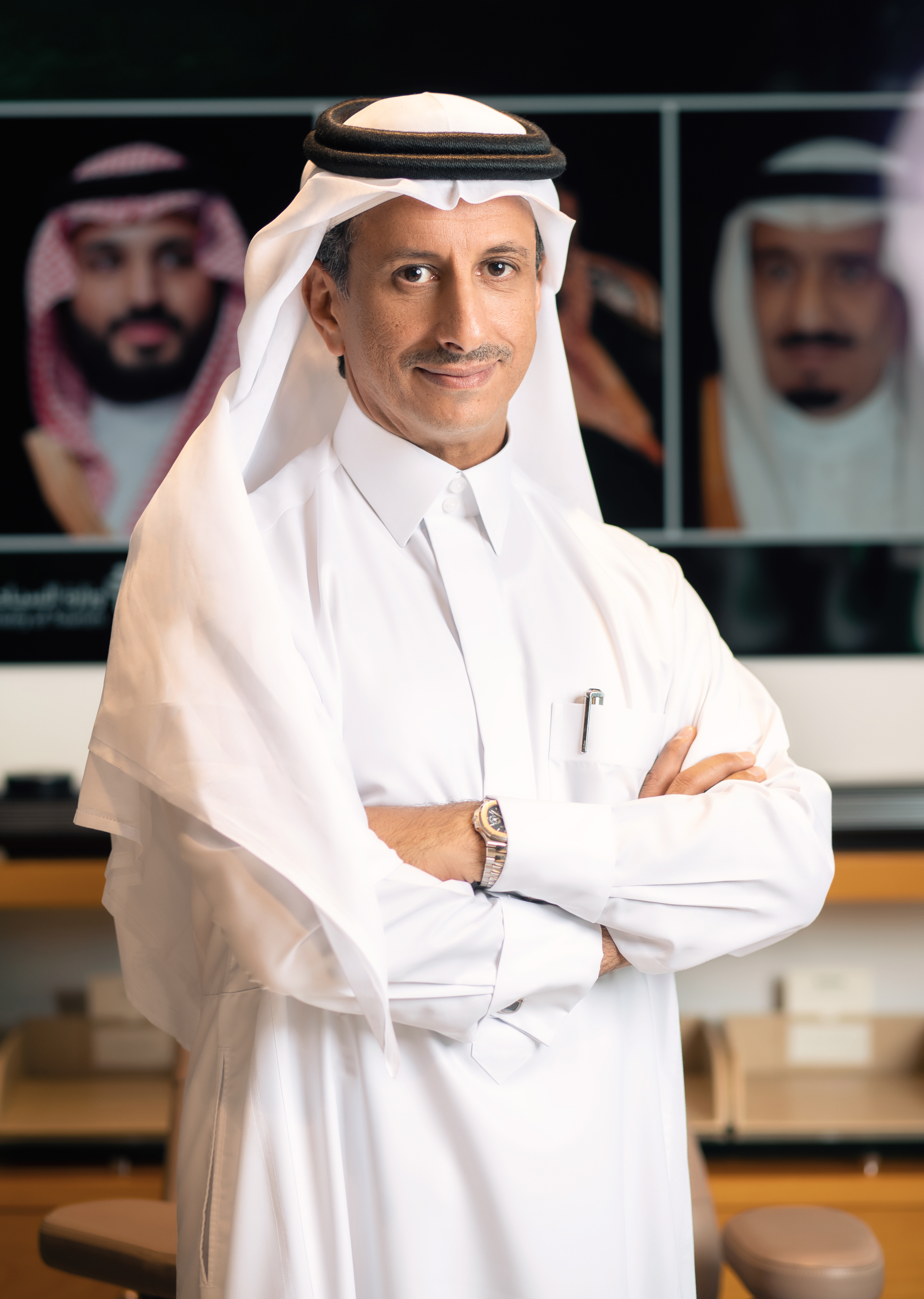
- Ahmed Al-Khateeb, the current Minister of Tourism since 25 February 2020

Agency overview
- Formed: 25 February 2020; 6 years ago
- Preceding agencies: Supreme Commission for Tourism (2000–2008); Saudi Commission for Tourism and Antiquities (2008–2015); Saudi Commission for Tourism and National Heritage (2015–2020)
- Jurisdiction: Government of Saudi Arabia
- Headquarters: Riyadh
- Minister responsible: Ahmed Al-Khateeb
- Child agencies: Saudi Tourism Authority; Saudi Red Sea Authority; Tourism Development Fund; Tourism Development Council; Tourism Information and Research Center
- Website: mt.gov.sa

The Ministry of Tourism (Note: Arabic: وزارة السياحة) is a government ministry in Saudi Arabia responsible for the regulation and oversight of tourism in Saudi Arabia, including the development of tourism sites, the management of heritage locations, licensing, and coordination with related entities.

== Overview and role ==
The Ministry of Tourism is the government body responsible for regulating and developing the tourism sector in Saudi Arabia. Its functions include setting policies for the sector, supporting investment, developing tourism services, and coordinating with other public entities involved in tourism, heritage, funding, promotion, and destination development.

The ministry was established in 2020 after the transformation of the Saudi Commission for Tourism and National Heritage into a ministry. The institutional development of the sector had earlier begun with the establishment of the Supreme Commission for Tourism in 2000, followed by later changes that expanded its responsibilities to include antiquities and national heritage before the creation of the ministry.

The ministry forms part of Saudi Arabia's wider tourism ecosystem, which includes entities such as the Saudi Tourism Authority, the Tourism Development Fund, the Tourism Development Council, the Saudi Red Sea Authority, and related public bodies. These entities have separate roles in areas such as tourism promotion, financing, regulation, planning, and destination development.

The ministry's work is connected to the National Tourism Strategy and Saudi Vision 2030. The strategy aims to increase domestic and international visits, expand tourism's contribution to the national economy, attract investment, create jobs, and develop tourism destinations across the Kingdom. The ministry also supports human-capability development in the tourism sector through training and qualification programs in cooperation with educational and training institutions.

== List of tourism officials ==
No.	Portrait	Official	Took office	Left office	Time in office
Secretaries General (2000–2020)
1		Sultan bin Salman	16 April 2000	27 December 2018	18 years, 255 days
2		Ahmed Al-Khateeb	27 December 2018	25 February 2020	1 year, 60 days
Ministers of Tourism (2020–present)
1		Ahmed Al-Khateeb	25 February 2020	Incumbent	6 years, 114 days

== Museums ==
- Clock Tower Museum, Mecca
- Al-Zaher Palace Museum, Mecca
- Al-Madinah Museum, Medina
- Hejaz Railway Museum, Medina
- Al-Masmak Palace Museum, Riyadh
- National Museum of Saudi Arabia, Riyadh
- Khuzam Palace Museum, Jeddah
- Tayma Museum, Tayma
- Al-Ahsa Museum, Al-Ahsa
- Al-Baha Museum, Al-Baha
- Al-Jouf Museum, Al-Jouf
- Al-Ula Museum, Al-Ula
- Shubra Palace Museum, Taif
- Tabuk Museum, Tabuk
- Northern Borders Museum, Arar
- Hail Museum, Hail
- Najran Museum, Najran
- Al-Namas Museum, Al-Namas
- Jazan Museum, Jazan
- Al-Ghat Museum, Al-Ghat
- Saudi Aramco Museum, Dhahran
- Currency Museum, Riyadh
- Royal Saudi Air Force Museum, Riyadh
- King Saud University Museum, Riyadh

== See also ==
- Ministries of Saudi Arabia
- Tourism in Saudi Arabia
- Saudi Red Sea Authority
- Saudi Tourism Authority
- Ancient towns in Saudi Arabia
- List of World Heritage Sites in Saudi Arabia
