= Tourism in Saudi Arabia =

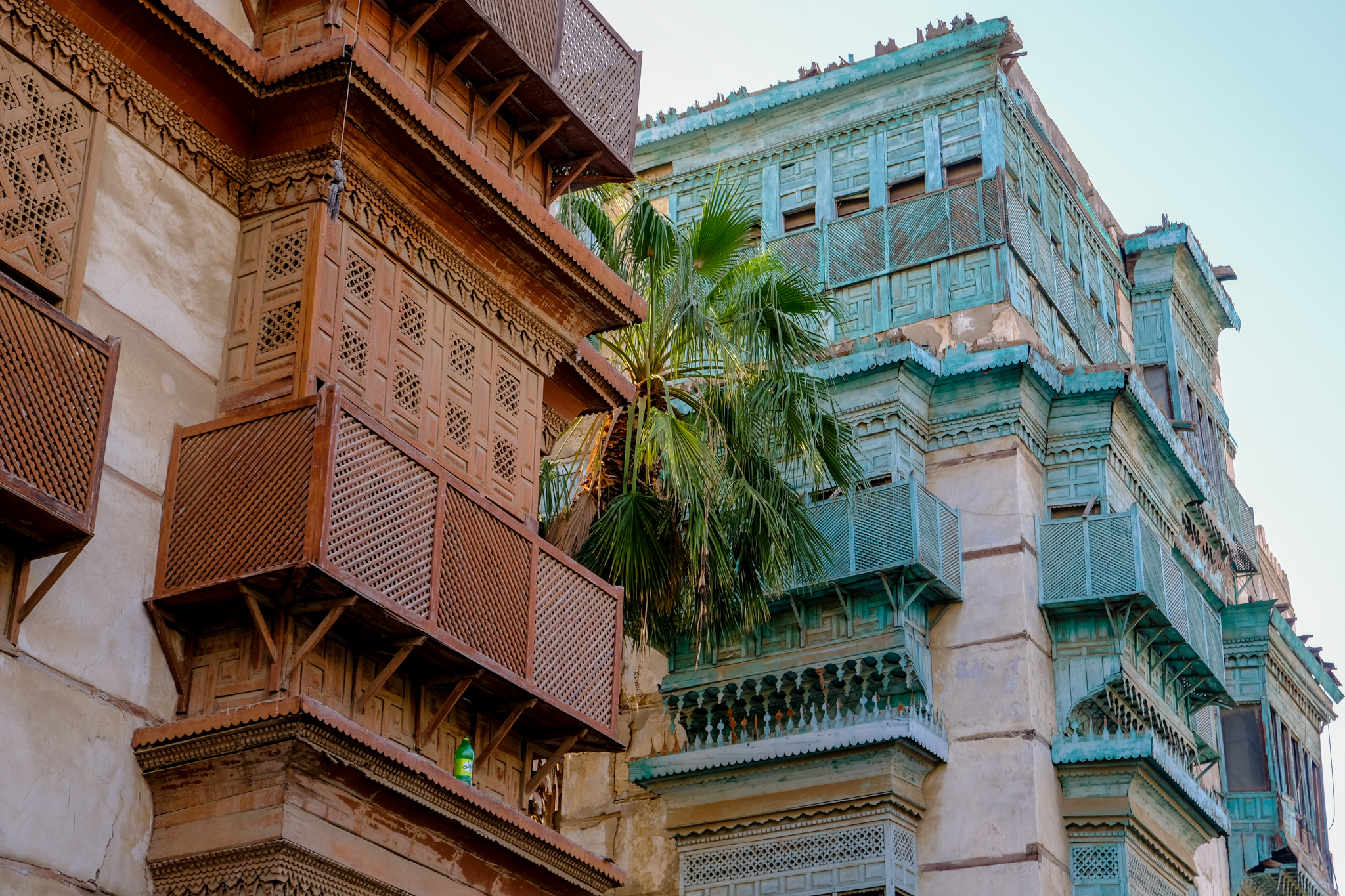
Al-Balad, Jeddah is a UNESCO World Heritage Site

Saudi Arabia is the second biggest tourist destination in the Middle East with over 16 million visiting in 2017. Although most tourism in Saudi Arabia still largely involves religious pilgrimages, there is growth in the leisure tourism sector, having generated $27.5 billion in 2019. Potential tourist areas include the Hijaz and Sarawat Mountains, Red Sea diving, and a number of ancient ruins.

According to the World Travel and Tourism Council (WTTC), in 2018, Travel and tourism in Saudi Arabia added 9% to the Kingdom’s total economy which is worth $65.2 billion.

In December 2013, Saudi Arabia announced its intention to begin issuing tourist visas for the first time in its history. Council of Ministers entrusted the Saudi Commission for Tourism and Antiquities with visa issuing on the basis of certain regulations approved by the Ministries of Interior and Foreign Affairs. On 27 September 2019, Saudi Arabia formally announced the issuance of the tourist visa to visitors from 49 countries for a fee of $80. The visa can be either obtained online (eVisa) or on arrival. Ten days after the implementation of instant tourist visas, 24,000 foreign visitors entered Saudi Arabia. China visitors topped the list, with the UK and the US in second and third.

Popular places to visit in Saudi Arabia are Makkah, Medina, Mada'in Salih, Yanbu, Tabuk, Jeddah and Riyadh.

Arriving in Saudi Arabia can be through 13 international airports served by various global airlines. There are also 15 domestic airports connecting the country regions and cites. For moving within the country, there are budget airlines like Flynas, Fyadeal, Nesma Airlines, in addition to Saudia and, from late 2025 onwards, Riyadh Air.

== Museums ==
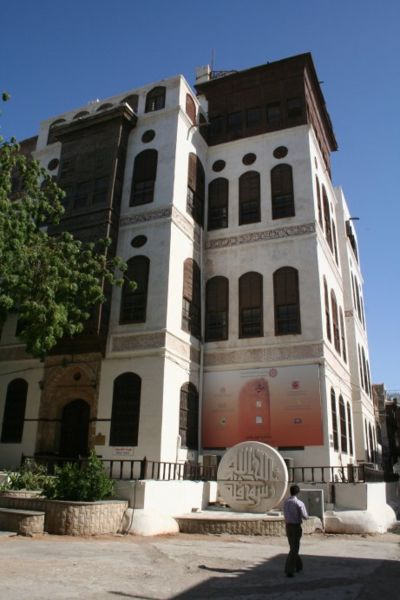
Nasseef House in Al-Balad, Jeddah

Saudi Arabia has a variety of museums ranging from historical museums, archeological museums, and cultural and scientific museums. These museums exhibit the art life, old handicrafts, and antiquities of the Kingdom and including:

- National Museum of Saudi Arabia: This is the most famous museum in Saudi Arabia. It was established in 1999 and is located in Riyadh as a part of the King Abdulaziz Historical Centre. The museum highlights the prominent history of the Arabian Peninsula and its historical role in Islam expanding as well as the history of Saudi Arabia. The museum also holds many ancient manuscripts that are traced back to many ancient civilizations. Indeed Saudi Arabia is considered one of the richest countries in regards of the number of ancient manuscripts.
- Al-Zaher Palace Museum: It is a historical museum established in 1944 and exhibits the history of Makkah and various archaeological collections for different periods of Islamic history in the region.
- Al-Madinah Museum: It exhibits Al-Madina's heritage and history featuring different archaeological collections, visual galleries and rare images that relate to Al-Medina. It also includes the Hejaz Railway Museum.
- Jeddah Regional Museum of Archaeology and Ethnography in Jeddah: it exhibits various collections including artifacts of the stone age back to the Acheulean period, elements illustrating the rise of Islam, and a collection of ethnographic items portraying the modern culture of the region.
- Nasseef House in Jeddah: a historical building in Al-Balad, founded in 1872. later, In 2009, it was transformed into a museum and cultural center.
- Royal Saudi Air Force Museum in Riyadh: This museum displays the history of the Royal Saudi Air Force.
- Masmak fort: is a clay and mud-brick fort, it was built around 1865.
- Makkah Antiquities and Heritage Museum: The museum was originally a royal guest house and went by the name of Zaher Palace. It was later converted into a school, and then into a museum.

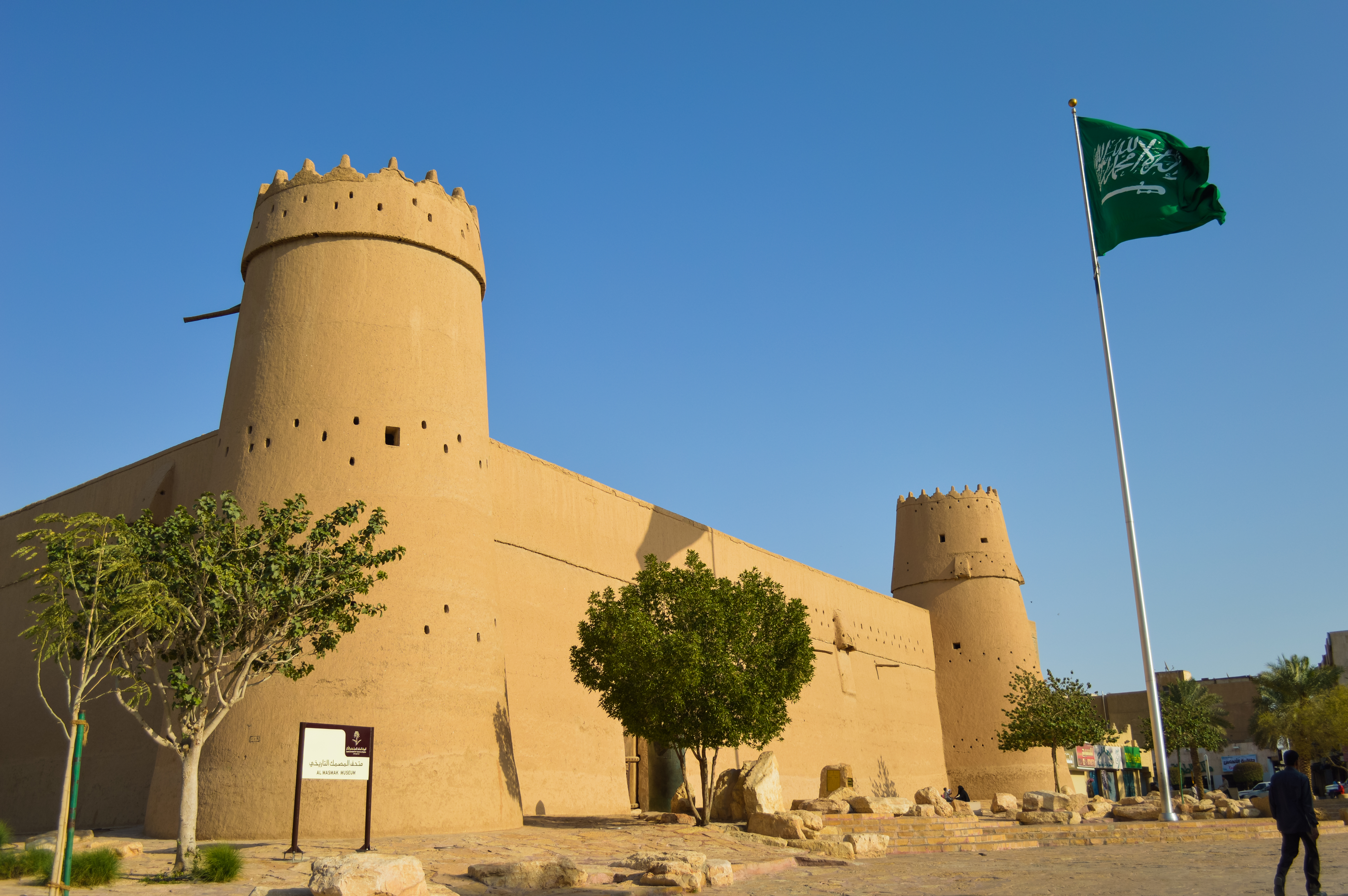
Masmak fort

- Tabuk Castle: is an ancient castle in Tabuk, the capital city of the Tabuk Region in northwestern Saudi Arabia which dates back to 1559. The castle has been rehabilitated and transformed into a museum open to all visitors.
- Dammam National Museum is located on the 4th floor of the Dammam Public Library, opposite the Muhammad bin Fahd Stadium on the cross lane from the Dammam-Khobar Highway in Al Toubaishi district. The museum focuses on the country's history, culture, and inhabitants through displays of relics and remnants of handicrafts.
- Museum of Buraidah
- Folk Village
- Al Ahsa Museum
- The Two Holy Mosques Architecture Exhibition
- Riyadh Zoo

== World Heritage Sites ==
Saudi Arabia has eight UNESCO World Heritage Sites, inscribed between 2008 and 2024; seven are cultural sites and one is a natural site. They are as follows:

- Al-Ahsa Oasis: The Al-Ahsa Oasis is a serial property comprising gardens, canals, springs, wells and a drainage lake, as well as historical buildings, urban fabric and archaeological sites.
- Mada'in Salih is a pre-Islamic archaeological site located in the AlUla sector, within the Al Madinah Region of Saudi Arabia. A majority of the vestiges date from the Nabatean kingdom (1st century AD). The site constitutes the kingdom's southernmost and largest settlement after Petra, its capital. Traces of Lihyanite and Roman occupation before and after the Nabatean rule, respectively, can also be found in situ, while accounts from the Qur’an tell of an earlier settlement of the area by the tribe of Thamud in the 3rd millennium BC.
- At-Turaif District in ad-Dir'iyah, a town in Saudi Arabia located on the northwestern outskirts of Riyadh. Diriyah was the original home of the Saudi royal family and served as the capital of the first Saudi dynasty from 1744 to 1818. Today, the town is the seat of the Diriyah Governorate, which also includes the villages of Uyayna, Jubayla, and Al-Ammariyyah, among others, and is part of Ar Riyad Province.
- Historic Jeddah: Historic Jeddah was as a major port for Indian Ocean trade routes, channelling goods to Mecca. It was also the gateway for Muslim pilgrims to Mecca who arrived by sea.
- Rock Art in the Hail Region: This property shows numerous representations of human and animal figures covering 10,000 years of history.
- Ḥimā Cultural Area: Inscribed in 2021, the site in southwestern Saudi Arabia contains rock art and inscriptions documenting cultural activity over thousands of years.
- 'Uruq Bani Ma'arid: Inscribed in 2023, the protected area covers desert ecosystems on the western edge of the Rub' al Khali and is Saudi Arabia's first natural World Heritage Site.
- The Cultural Landscape of Al-Faw Archaeological Area: Inscribed in 2024, the site preserves an archaeological landscape located along ancient trade routes in the Arabian Peninsula.

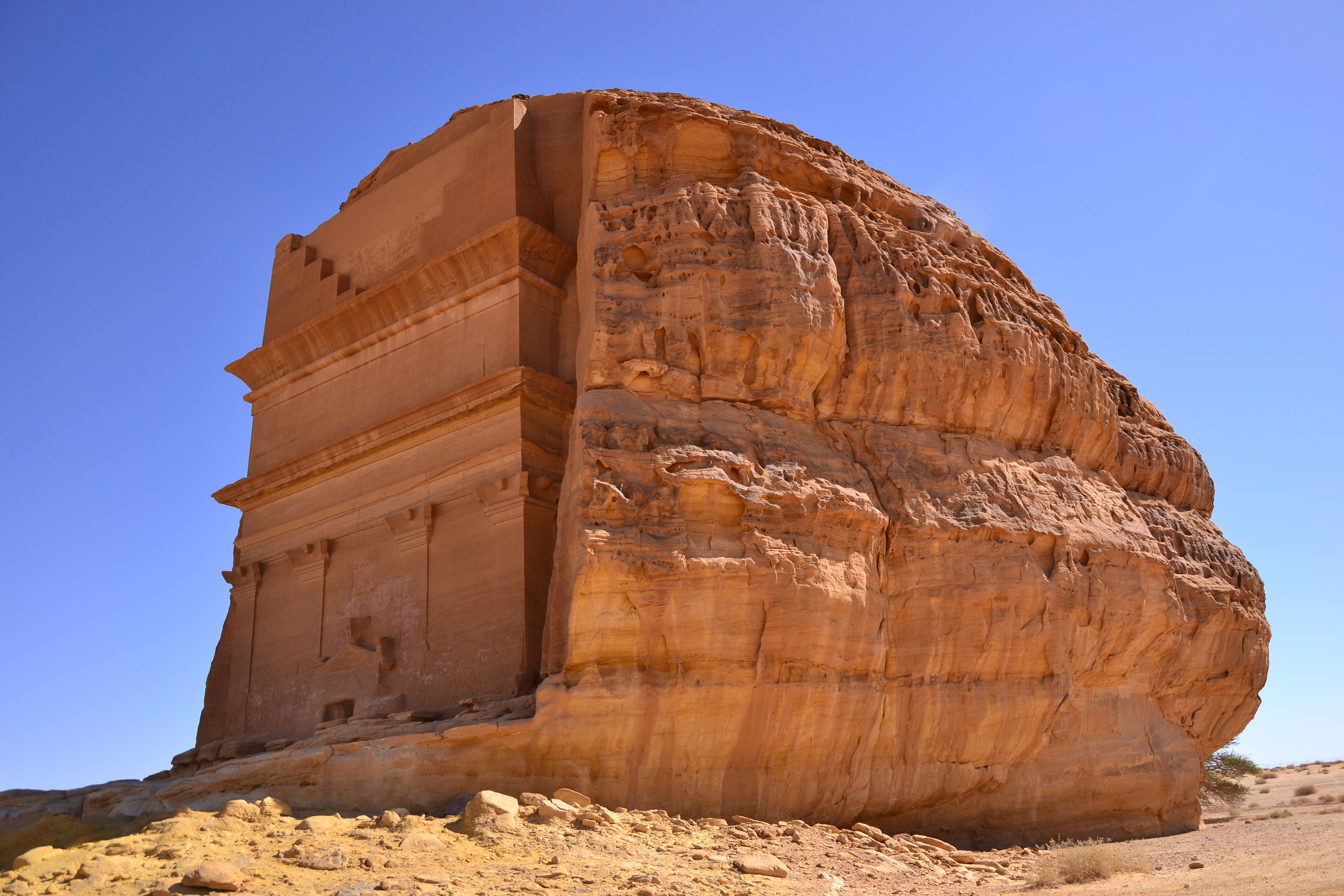
Mada'in Salih

== Main festivals and events ==
- Jenadriyah: It is an annual cultural and heritage festival held in Jenadriyah near Riyadh. The festival hosts various cultural and heritage events such as Al Janadriya Operetta, Saudi ardah, and camel racing.
- Souk Okaz: It is an annual cultural event held in Ta'if. It was known as an open market in the ancient past. Nowadays, Souk Okaz combines more than 150 attractions of heritage and cultural events, theatre performances, and arts and crafts.
- Historic Jeddah Festival: is a celebration that takes place in the historical Al Balad district of Jeddah. The festival exhibits the culture and heritage of Jeddah.
- “Winter at Tantora” festival : an annual festival held in the old town of AlUla, in northwestern Saudi Arabia.
- Ha'il International Rally
- Al Qassim Date Festival: is the largest date festival in the world held in the central Qassim region of Saudi Arabia.
- King Abdulaziz Falconry Festival is an international festival organized by the Saudi Falcons Club and witnesses the participation of a group of falcon owners in the Kingdom and the Gulf Cooperation Council.

== Religious tourism ==
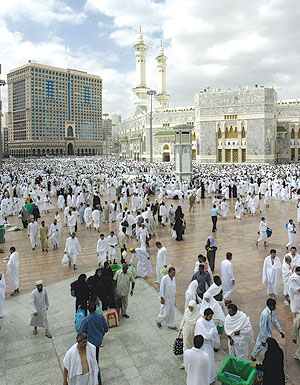
Muslim pilgrims in Mecca

Tourism in Saudi Arabia still largely involves religious pilgrimages. Mecca and Medina receive over three million pilgrims a year during the month of Dhu al-Hijjah in Hajj, and around two million during the month of Ramadan to perform Umrah. During the rest of the year, Mecca and Medina receive around four million for Umrah. The Hajj, or pilgrimage to the city, is one of the five pillars of Islam. Non-Muslims are not permitted to enter the Grand Mosque and its premises in Mecca, or the Prophet's Mosque and its premises in Medina.

The Ministry of Hajj and Umrah launched Nusuk in 2022 as a digital platform for pilgrims and visitors travelling to Mecca and Medina. The platform provides services connected with Hajj, Umrah and visits to Islamic holy sites; in 2026, Saudi Gazette reported that the Nusuk app had surpassed 51 million users worldwide.

== Saudi Seasons ==
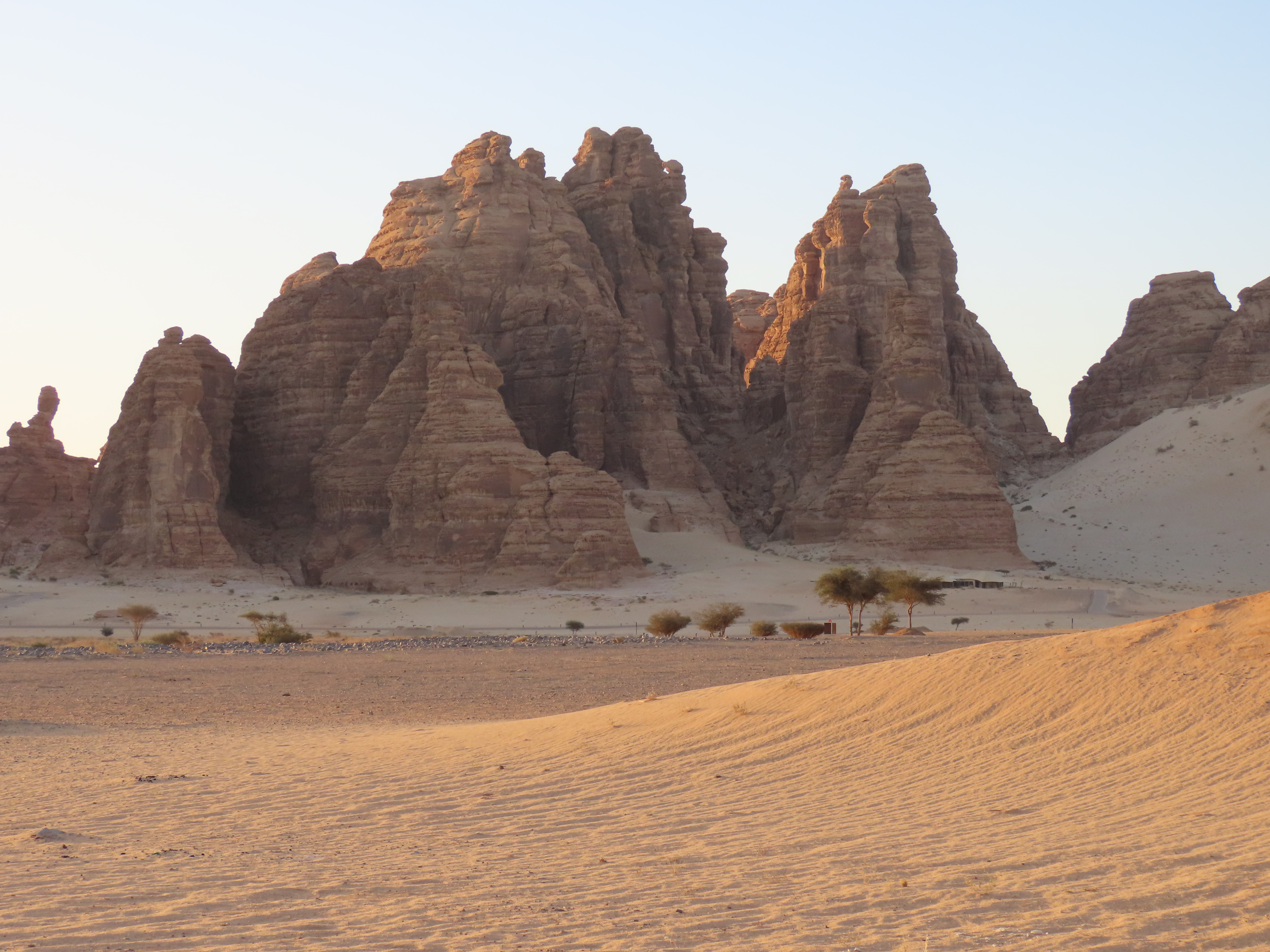
Wadi Ashar in Al-'Ula

In 2019, the General Entertainment Authority and the Ministry of Tourism launched an initiative known as "Saudi Seasons", a portfolio of cultural festivals held to highlight regions and observances to encourage tourism in support of Saudi Vision 2030; the 11 events include Riyadh Season, Jeddah Season, Sharqiah Season, Taif Season, Al Soudah Season, National Day Season, Al-Diriyah Season, Al-Ula Season, Hail Season, Ramadan, and Eid Al-Fitr.. Each of the events includes various cultural, spiritual, entertainment, and sporting events.

The first of these events—Riyadh Season—has been the most commercially successful, generating large levels of tourism revenue (with the first edition attracting 6 billion riyals and 11 million visitors to the city over the 66-day period), and being used as part of international sponsorships.

== Other sites ==
The Red Sea is being developed as a beach resort where women can wear bikinis. The construction began in 2019. The Red Sea is one of the seven wonders of the underwater world. Known for its beautiful coral reefs and abundant marine life, it is listed as one of the best diving locations in the world.

== Arrivals by country ==
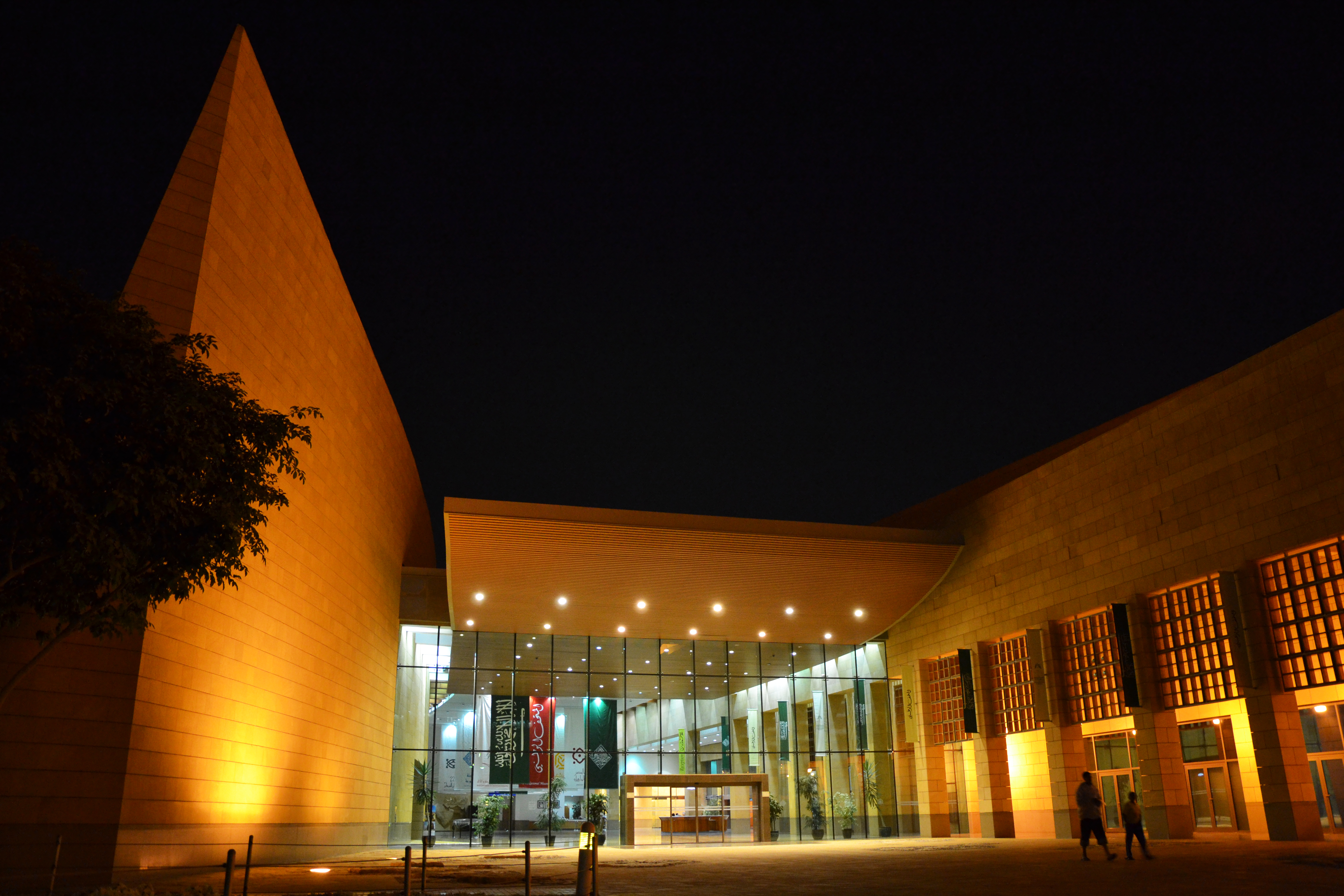
National Museum

Number of arrivals

Most visitors arriving in Saudi Arabia on a short term basis were from the following countries:

Rank	Country	2016	2024
1	Bangladesh	3,006,729	2,090,123
2	Pakistan	2,878,674	2,878,674
3	Indonesia	2,555,000	1,925,540
4	Yemen	2,426,711	2,026,543
5	India	1,800,431	1,900,431
6	Egypt	1,162,955	3,262,955
7	Iraq	999,683	1,076,223
8	Jordan	801,000	1,234,768
9	Bahrain	1,784,502	2,654,000
10	Kuwait	1,500,318	2,143,450

== Future prospects ==
Saudi Arabia’s overall number of tourist trips is on course to be 93.8 million by 2023, up from 64.7 million in 2018. Riyadh and Jeddah hosted Color Runs in late 2019. Hotels are no longer required to ask Saudi couples for proof of marriage for a check-in. The government is spending billions on bringing forms of entertainment such as wrestling, tennis, car racing, expensive restaurants and concerts to expand tourism. Saudi Arabia also established the Tourism Development Fund in 2020 to support financing and private-sector investment in tourism projects, with initial capital of US$4 billion.

== Hospitality ==
Alcohol is banned in Saudi Arabia. Saudi Arabia is scheduled to host the 2034 FIFA World Cup. In 2025, Prince Khalid bin Bandar Al Saud stated that alcohol would not be sold during the tournament, including at hotels.

=== Tourism in Saudi Arabia during the Iran War ===
Thousands of pilgrims were left stranded in Saudi Arabia during the Umrah rituals, and the Saudi government did not offer to cover costs.

== Promotion ==
=== Lionel Messi as ambassador ===
The Kingdom of Saudi Arabia signed Argentine professional footballer and Paris Saint-Germain forward, Lionel Messi, as its tourism ambassador in May 2022. Messi was signed by Saudi Arabia as its ambassador during a trip he made to the country’s port city of Jeddah, along the Red Sea. Saudi’s Minister of Tourism, Ahmed Al Khateeb officially announced the signing in a tweet by writing, “This is not his first visit to the kingdom and it will not be the last”, indicating the footballer’s future visits to Saudi for promoting its tourism. The news received critical reactions from media and human rights groups calling it Saudi Arabia’s use of sports to improve its reputation.

In August 2022, Messi was reached out by the family of a 15-year-old boy who was arrested in Saudi Arabia and charged with a death sentence. The family wrote a letter requesting Messi to intervene in the case of Mohammed al Faraj, who was arrested in 2017 for allegedly committing crime against the Saudi regime. Whereas, the family of the young man claimed that he was tortured into confessing for the crimes, he did not commit. Reprieve, the human rights organization working with the family on the case also claimed Saudi Arabia as using sport to launder its reputation.

== Gallery ==
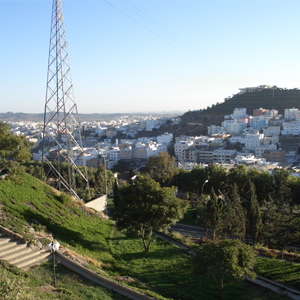
Abha City, located 2,270 m (7,450 ft) above sea level in the 'Asir Region

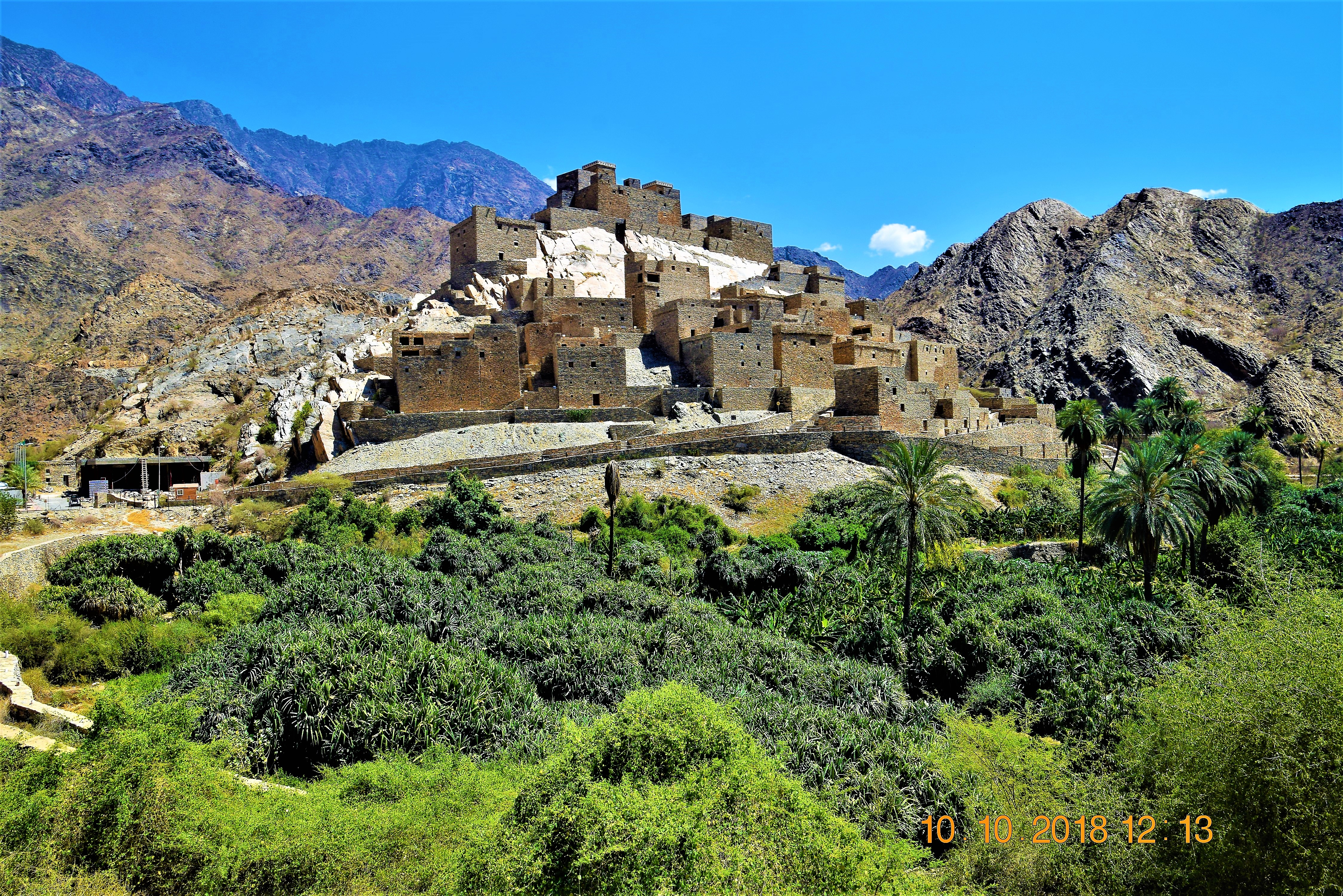
Dhi 'ain village located in Al Bahah Province

The desert of Al-Rub' Al-Khali (The Empty Quarter)

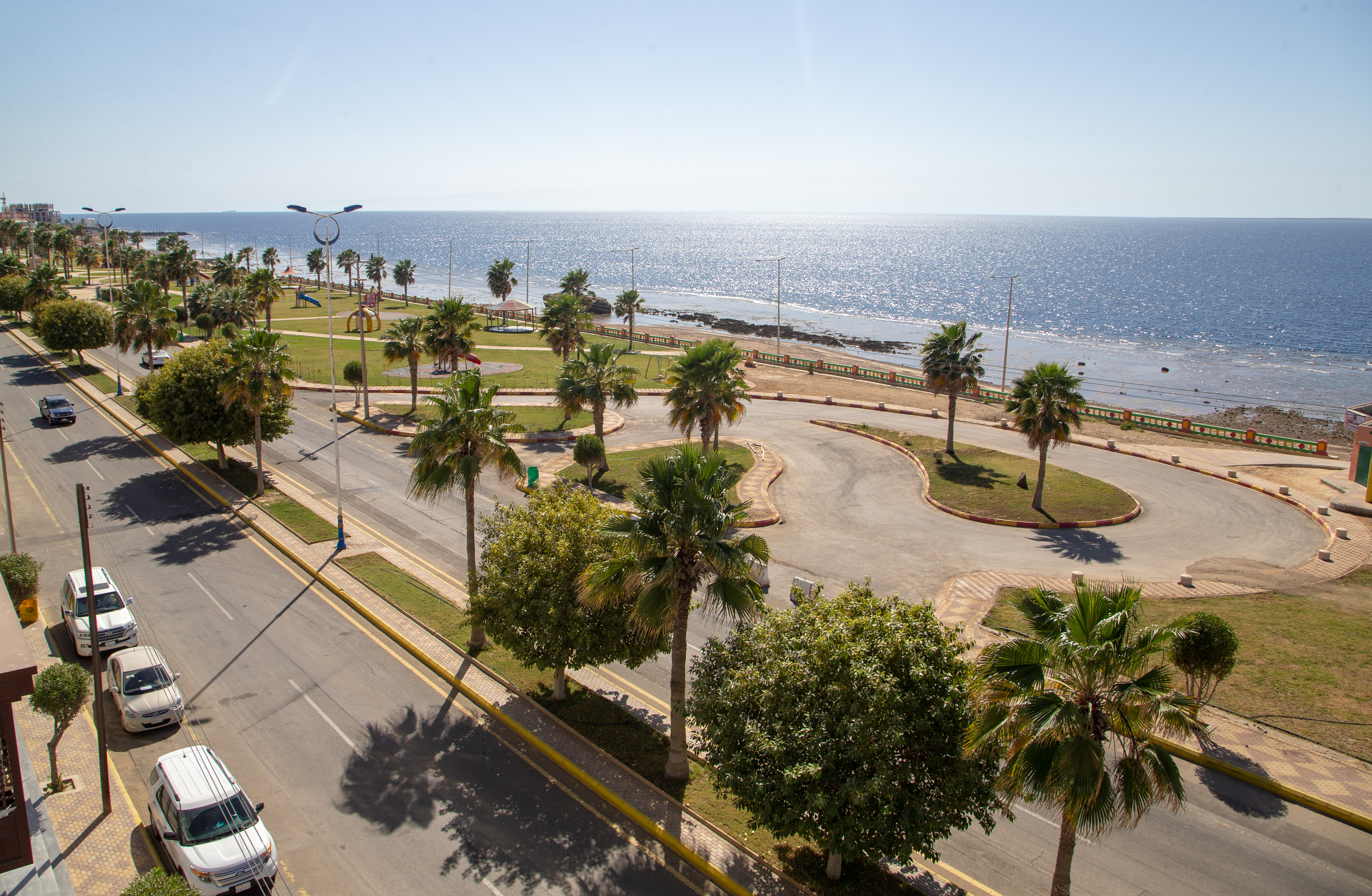
Beach promenade in Al-Wajh

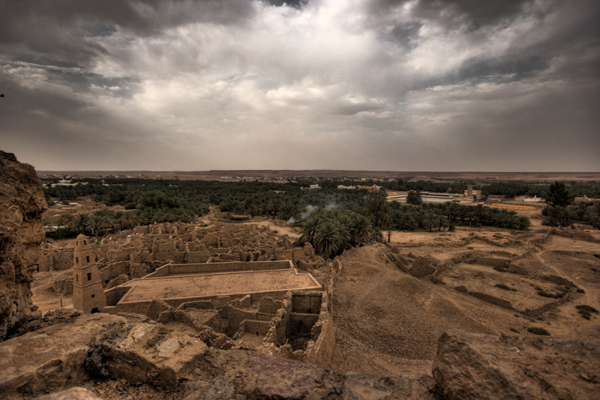
The 3000-year-old ancient historical city of Dumat al-Jandal in Al Jawf Province

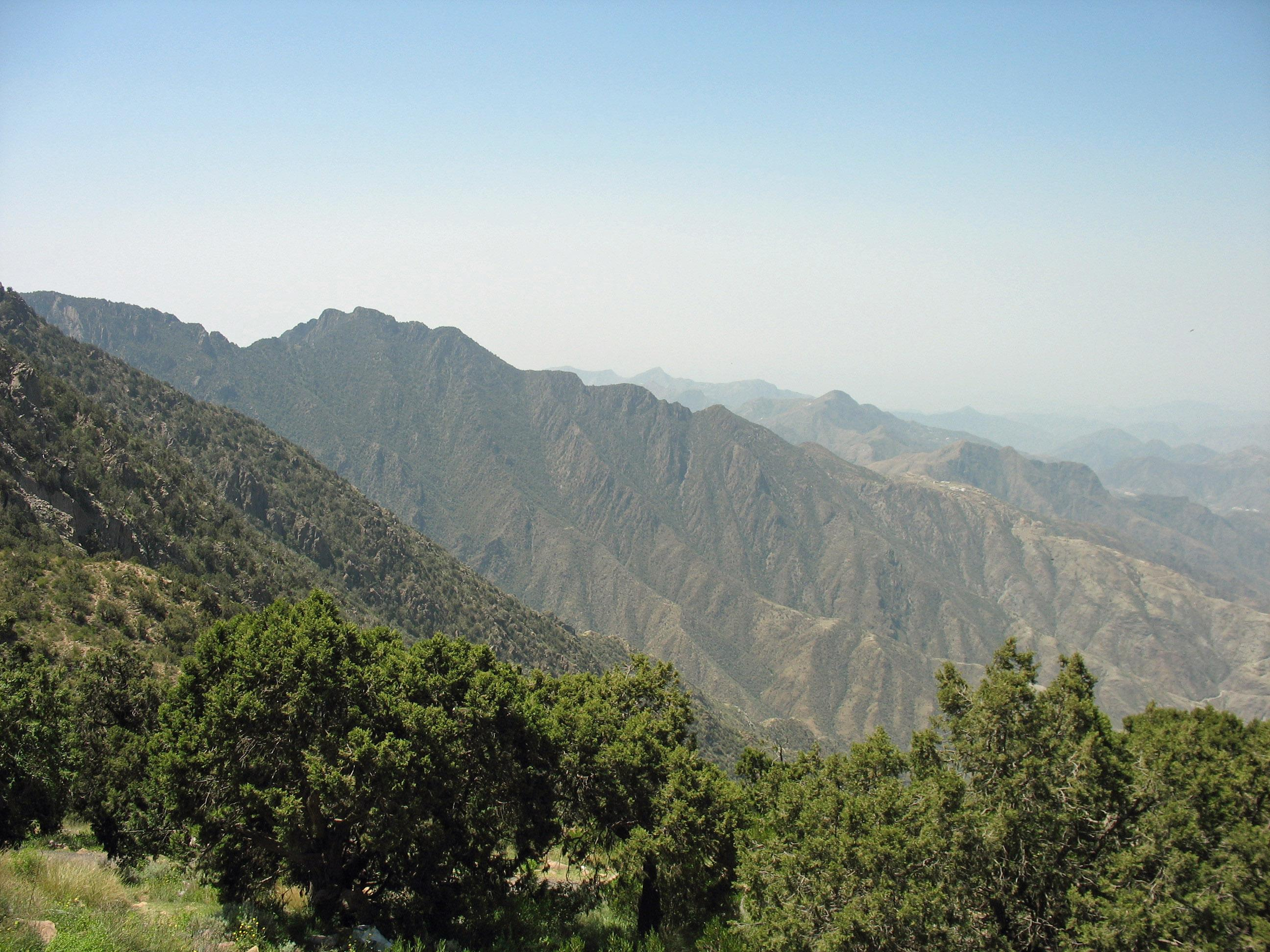
Jabal Sawda (3,000 m or 9,800 ft) located in the 'Asir subrange of the Sarat Mountains

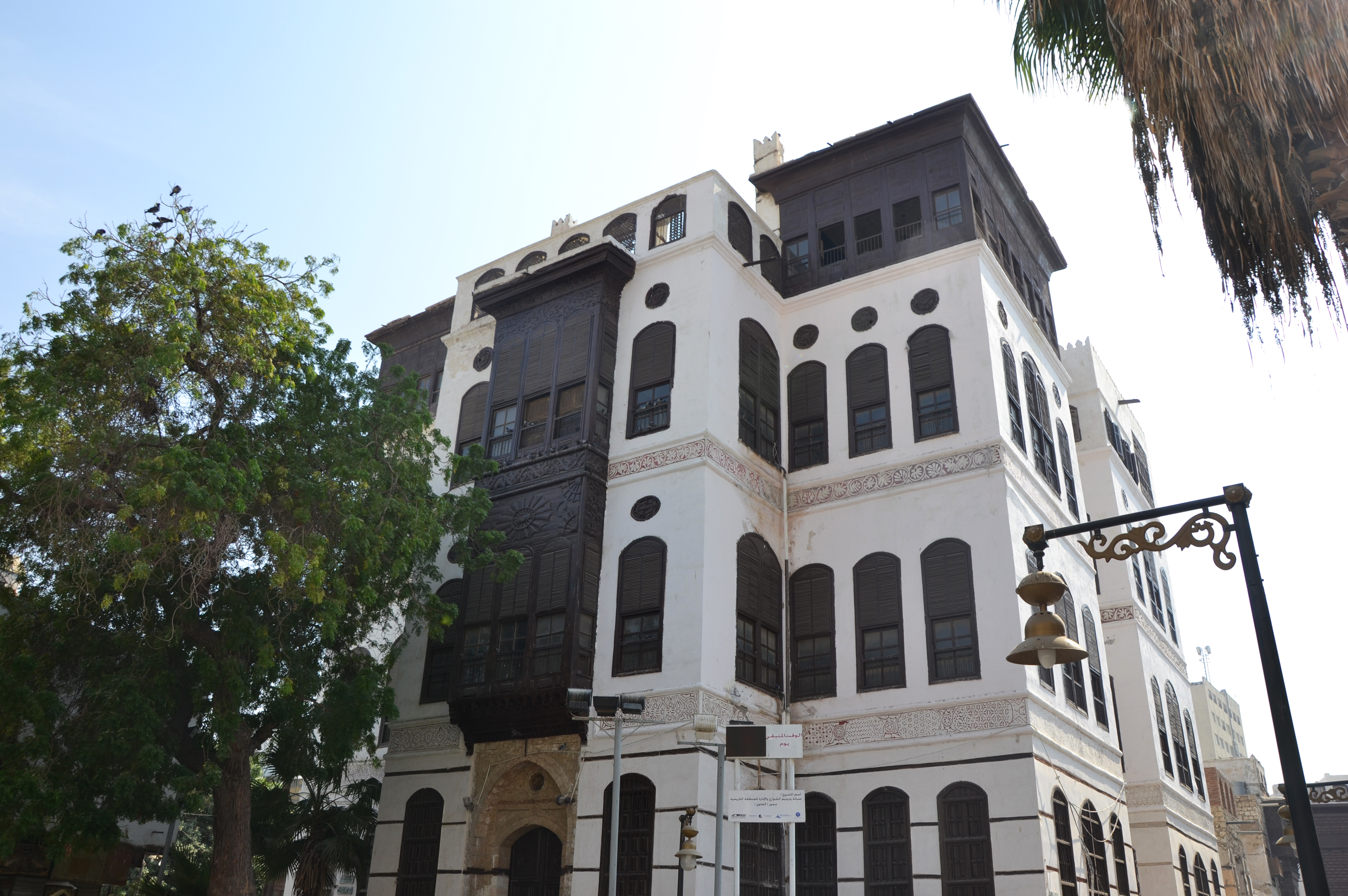
The old city of Jeddah

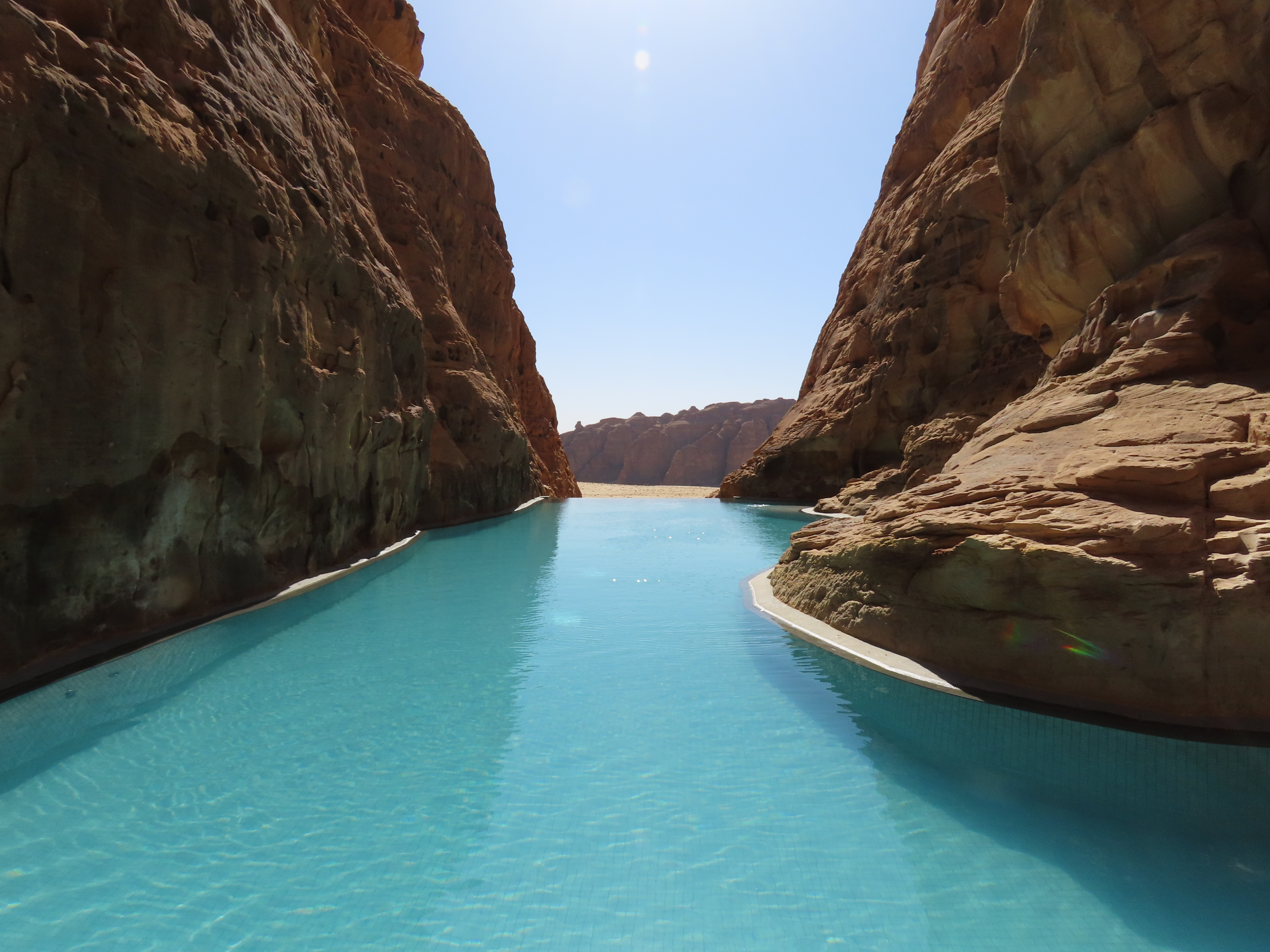
Rock pool at Banyan Tree AlUla

== See also ==
- Tourism in Egypt
- Economy of Saudi Arabia
- Museums in Saudi Arabia
- Visa policy of Saudi Arabia
- Public Decency Law in Saudi Arabia
- LGBTQ rights in Saudi Arabia
- Women's rights in Saudi Arabia
- Sex segregation in Saudi Arabia
