= List of museums in Saudi Arabia =

This is a list of museums in Saudi Arabia.

== Museums in Saudi Arabia ==
- Al-Faisal Museum for Arab-Islamic Art

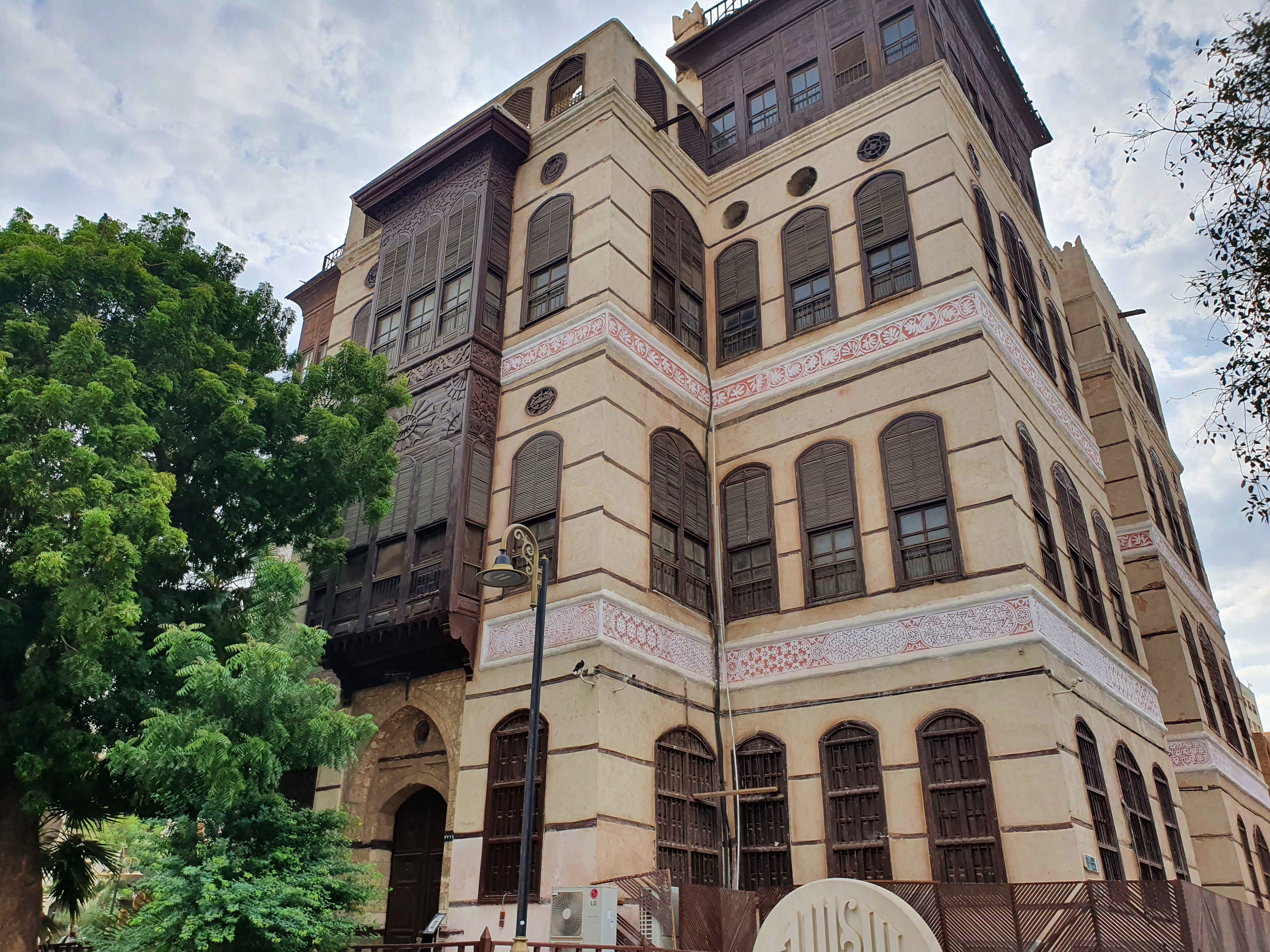
Nasseef House, Saudi Arabia

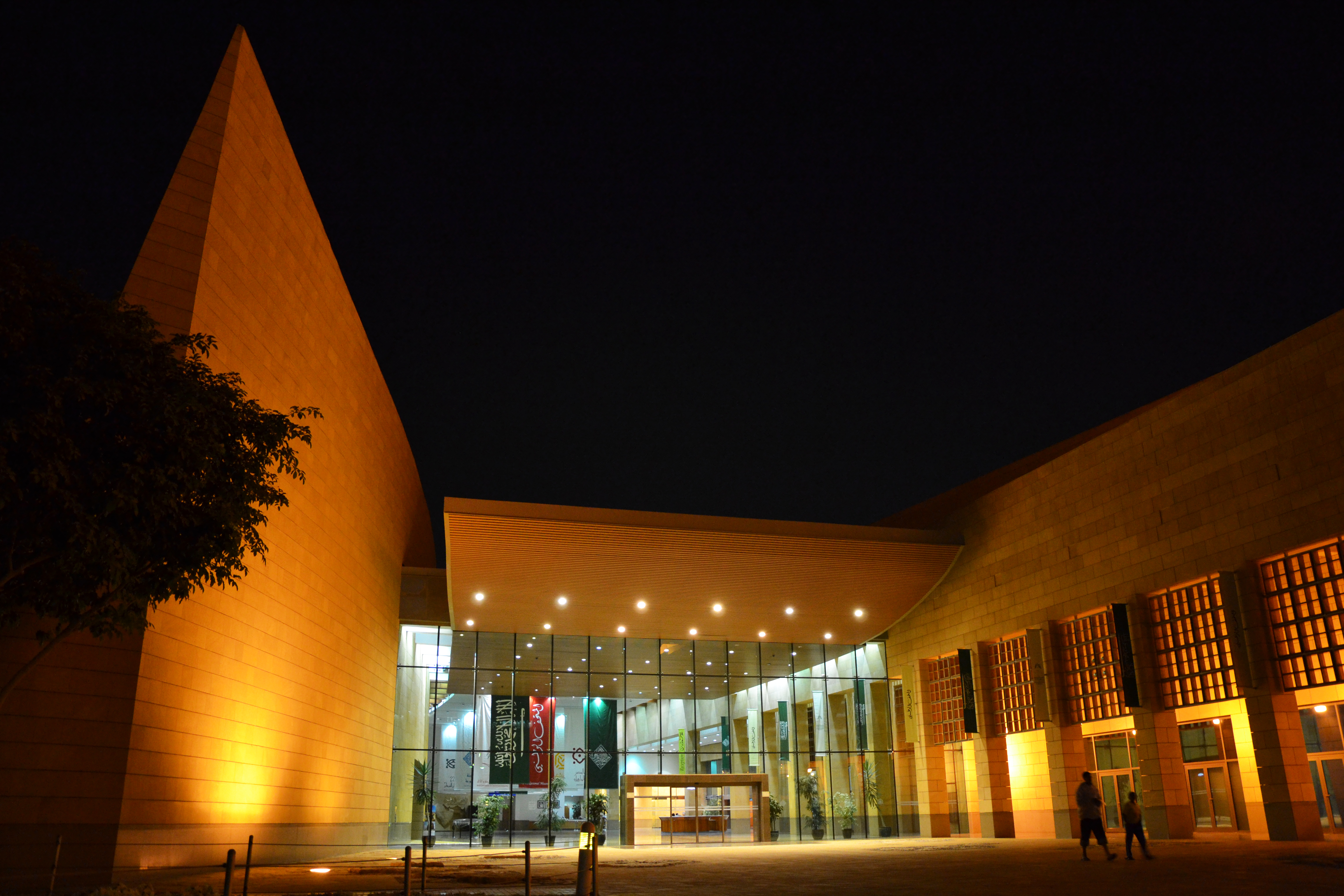
National Museum of Saudi Arabia

- Al Bassam Heritage House
- Clock Tower Museum
- Dar Al Madinah Museum
- Darat Safeya Bizagr
- Hafouf National Museum
- Hejaz Railway Museum
- Humane Heritage Museum
- Jadeah Museum
- Jeddah Regional Museum of Archaeology and Ethnography
- Al-Jouf Museum of Archaeology and Folklore
- King Abdulaziz Historical Center
- King Abdulaziz Center for World Culture, also known as Ithra.
- Al-Madina Museum
- Mada'in Saleh
- Masmak fort
- Murabba Palace
- Naila Art Gallery
- Nasseef House
- National Museum of Saudi Arabia
- Red Sea Museum
- Royal Saudi Air Force Museum
- Al-Salam Museum
- SAMA Money Museum
- Shadda Palace
- Sharif Museum
- Shubra Palace
- Tabuk Castle
- Tayybat Museum
- The Two Holy Mosques Architecture Exhibition
- Al-Zaher Palace Museum
- Islamic Dinar Museum

== See also ==
- List of museums
- Tourism in Saudi Arabia
- Museums in Saudi Arabia
  - Museums in Riyadh
