= Saudi Tourism Authority =

Subsidiary governmental body which focuses on promoting Saudi Arabia's tourism

- الهيئة السعودية للسياحة

Agency overview
- Formed: March 10, 2020; 6 years ago
- Jurisdiction: Government of Saudi Arabia
- Headquarters: Alharith ibn Zahrah Street, Al Raed, Riyadh 12355, Saudi Arabia
- Agency executives: Ahmed bin Aqil al-Khateeb, Chairman; Fahd Hamidaddin, CEO
- Parent agency: Ministry of Tourism
- Website: sta.gov.sa Visit Saudi

The Saudi Tourism Authority (STA) (Arabic: الهيئة السعودية للسياحة, romanized: al-Haīʾiah as-Saʿūdīyah as-Sīāḥah) is an organ of Saudi Arabia's Ministry of Tourism that is concerned with promoting travel and tourism industry of the country. Established in March 2020 by King Salman against the backdrop of the surging COVID-19 pandemic, it is the official promoter of the Visit Saudi program and supervises tourism-related marketing campaigns domestically and internationally.

== History ==
The Saudi Tourism Authority (STA) was established on March 10, 2020, through a royal decree issued by King Salman after approval from the Council of Ministers and upon recommendations from the Council of Economic and Development Affairs. In June 2020, it launched the Tanaffasa (Arabic: تنفس, lit. 'breathe') programme, which lasted between 25 June and 30 September that saw 10 natural tourist spots being selected across the country for tourists and travelers to explore Saudi Arabia's summer season. In December 2020, the body organized the Sheeta Haulaka (Arabic: الشتاء حولك, romanized: al-Šitāʾ Ḥaūlaka, lit. 'Winter is around you') programme, which lasted between 10 December and the end of March 2021 that saw 17 destinations being selected within Saudi Arabia, allowing tourists and travelers to explore the country's geographical and climatic diversity during the winter season. In March 2021, it launched the Tourism Makers initiative which aimed at encouraging small and medium business enterprises in the private sector to engage in the country's growing tourism industry. In December 2021, it launched the Ruh as-Saudiyah programme (Arabic: روح السعودية, romanized: Rūḥ as-Saʿūdīyyah, lit. 'Spirit of Saudi') that organized events to showcase the culture and heritage of Saudi Arabia and aimed at targeting tourists from the member states of the Gulf Cooperation Council as well as the Middle East region. In November 2023, a Tokyo-based travel company, HIS and the Saudi Tourism Authority signed a memorandum of understanding (MoU) to boost tourism in the Kingdom. In November 2023, The Saudi Tourism Authority, along with other Saudi entities, took part in Media Oasis, a Ministry of Media initiative, in France, aims at redefining media coverage by utilizing modern technology in covering national events and global engagements. In 2023, Saudi Arabia welcomed 100 million tourists, reaching its Vision 2030 tourism target seven years ahead of schedule, according to the World Travel & Tourism Council (WTTC).

In 2023, STA via its brand "Visit Saudi" sponsored LaLiga and tried to be a sponsor of the 2023 FIFA Women's World Cup, but was dropped after player backlash. In 2024 Lionel Messi as Saudi's tourism ambassador, part of the sponsorship deal with STA, in a global launched campaign titled "Go Beyond What You Think", places a spotlight on Saudi's open culture and the importance of inspiring young Saudi women to reach their full potential.

== Visit Saudi ==
Visit Saudi is the official digital gateway to explore the Kingdom’s landmarks, cultural heritage, and authentic hospitality. As the flagship platform of the Saudi Tourism Authority, it provides up-to-date information on destinations, experiences, and events across the Kingdom.

== See also ==
- Tourism Development Fund
