= Global City (Dammam) =

Cultural and entertainment destination in Dammam, Saudi Arabia

Global City Dammam
- المدينة العالمية بالدمام
- Location: Al-Buhaira District, Dammam, Saudi Arabia
- Area: 675,000 m2 (overall project)
- Opened: 29 December 2025
- Operator: Weja AlDawliya Organizing Exhibitions and Conferences
- Website: globalcitydammam.com

Global City Dammam is a cultural, commercial and entertainment destination located in the Al-Buhaira District of Dammam, in the Eastern Province of Saudi Arabia. Situated near Saihat Lake and the Persian Gulf, the project brings together international cultural pavilions, restaurants, shopping areas, entertainment attractions and cultural events.

The project is a public–private partnership involving the Eastern Province municipality and the private sector. Its investor is Akafut Tangsilkosonong, also known as Tony Vega. The Saudi company Weja AlDawliya Organizing Exhibitions and Conferences, associated with the Vega Group, develops and operates the destination.

== History ==
Global City Dammam was developed as a tourism, cultural and entertainment investment project in the Eastern Province. The Eastern Province Municipality made land available in the Al-Buhaira District for the project through an investment partnership with the private sector.

On 29 December 2025, the Governor of the Eastern Province, Prince Saud bin Naif bin Abdulaziz, officially inaugurated the project. The inauguration ceremony was attended by government officials, business representatives and investors.

== Location and area ==
Global City Dammam is located in the Al-Buhaira District of Dammam, near Saihat Lake and the Persian Gulf coastline.

According to the Saudi government's Furas investment portal, the overall project covers an area of 675,000 square metres. The completed first phase covers 164,624 square metres. The project has a planned duration of 25 years.

== Management and development ==
The project is being developed through a partnership between the Eastern Province Municipality and the private sector. Akafut Tangsilkosonong, known as Tony Vega, is identified as the investor in the government investment portal.

Weja AlDawliya Organizing Exhibitions and Conferences is the Saudi company responsible for developing, operating and maintaining Global City Dammam. It is associated with the Vega Group.

The project is authorised by the Ministry of Municipalities and Housing.

== Attractions and facilities ==
Global City Dammam features international pavilions representing different countries and regions. The pavilions showcase cultural traditions, handicrafts, food, products and entertainment.

Its attractions and facilities include:

- International cultural pavilions.
- Restaurants and food stalls.
- Shopping markets and retail outlets.
- Amusement rides and games.
- Cultural performances and live entertainment.
- Children's play areas.
- Boat activities on the lake.
- A zoo and other family attractions.

== Seasons ==
=== First season ===
The first season featured international cultural pavilions, shopping markets, restaurants, amusement attractions and cultural activities.

According to the Emirate of the Eastern Province, the first season attracted more than three million visitors of different nationalities and age groups over a period of five months.

=== Second season ===
The second season was announced to open to the public on 19 November 2026. Its programme included expanded cultural pavilions, international markets and additional entertainment facilities.

Planned additions included:

- Asian Village.
- Kabayan Night Market.
- Future District.
- Artificial intelligence and robotics experiences.
- Dinosaur City.
- An interactive dancing fountain.
- Additional international pavilions and markets.

According to the Saudi Press Agency's report on the expansion plan, the second season was planned to feature 23 international pavilions, five open-air global markets, 13 restaurants, six cafés and 60 food and beverage kiosks.

== Tourism and economic significance ==
Global City Dammam is part of the Eastern Province's efforts to expand tourism, entertainment, cultural activities and private-sector investment. The project is also associated with the objectives of Saudi Vision 2030, particularly the development of tourism and non-oil economic activities.

== Gallery ==
Global City entrance

Global City Logo

Japan Enclosure

Pakistan pavilion

Palestine Pavilion

India pavilion

Africa pavilion

Korea Pavilion

Syria Pavilion

Russia Pavilion

China Pavilion

Turkey Pavilion

== See also ==
- Dammam
- Eastern Province, Saudi Arabia
- Saudi Arabia
- Saudi Vision 2030
- Tourism in Saudi Arabia
- Amusement park
