= Al-Salam Museum =

- Location within Saudi Arabia
- Location: Al-Madinah, Saudi Arabia
- Coordinates: 24°28′38″N 39°41′16″E
- Type: Historic museum

Al-Salam Museum (Madinah Peace Museum) is a museum planned to be constructed to the west of the Prophet's Mosque in Madinah, Saudi Arabia. The total area of the museum is around 17,400 square metres (187,000 sq ft). As of March 2, 2023, construction is interrupted.

== Objective ==
The main aim of the museum is to enhance the experience of Madinah visitors by introducing them to a cultural venue. Moreover, it aims at highlighting the Saudi efforts to serve the two holy cities, namely Makkah and Madinah.

== Components ==
The museum will include 10 halls such as:

- One hall explains the reasons behind the Prophet's decision to immigrate to Madinah.
- The other one displays the Prophet's Mosque.
- The third provides details about the historic area in Madinah.
- There is a hall to explain the importance of peace in Islam.

== See also ==
- List of museums in Saudi Arabia
