= Clock Tower Museum =

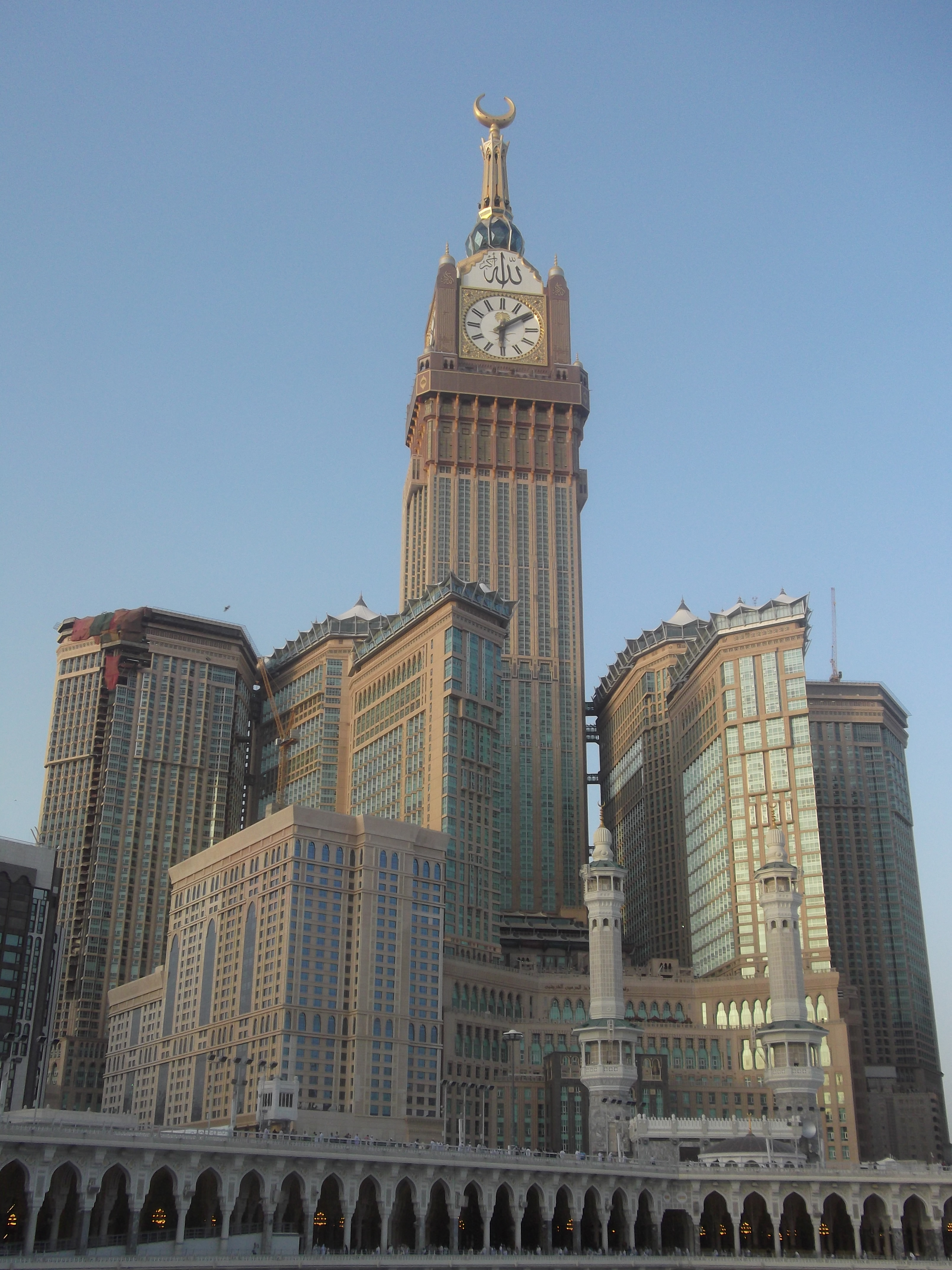

- Location within Saudi Arabia
- Location: Makkah, Saudi Arabia
- Coordinates: 21.17808°N 39.825552°E
- Type: Science Museum
- Website: https://www.clocktowermuseum.com

The Clock Tower Museum is a museum occupying the top four floors of the Mecca Royal Clock Tower in Mecca, Saudi Arabia. The museum, located at the highest point in Makkah, is operated by the Misk Foundation, a non-profit organization established by Crown Prince Muhammad Bin Salman.

== Departments ==
The museum opened to visitors in May 2019. It has four floors where each floor represents a unique topic. The first floor documents the Makkah tower, its architectural and foundational design and progresses through the production stages. The second floor exhibits time measurements used in ancient days. The third floor explains how the sun, the moon, and the Earth were used in the past to organize life and activities. The fourth floor depicts details of space and planets. There is also a balcony with a panoramic view of the Grand Mosque.

== See also ==
- List of museums in Saudi Arabia
- The Clock Towers
- Islamic Dinar Museum
