= Humane Heritage Museum =

Museum in Jeddah, Saudi Arabia

The Human Heritage Museum, also known as the Humane Heritage Museum, is a private heritage museum in the Aziziyah neighborhood of Makkah, Saudi Arabia. It was established by Majdou Al-Ghamdi and his family, and displays historical objects related to daily life, traditional crafts, clothing, weapons, manuscripts, and old tools.

== Collection ==
The museum's collection includes rare and ancient artefacts, along with traditional tools from earlier periods. It also includes manuscripts, books, weapons, clothing, cutlery and household items.

== See also ==
- List of museums in Saudi Arabia
