= Shadda Palace =

Palace in Saudi Arabia

- قصر شدا
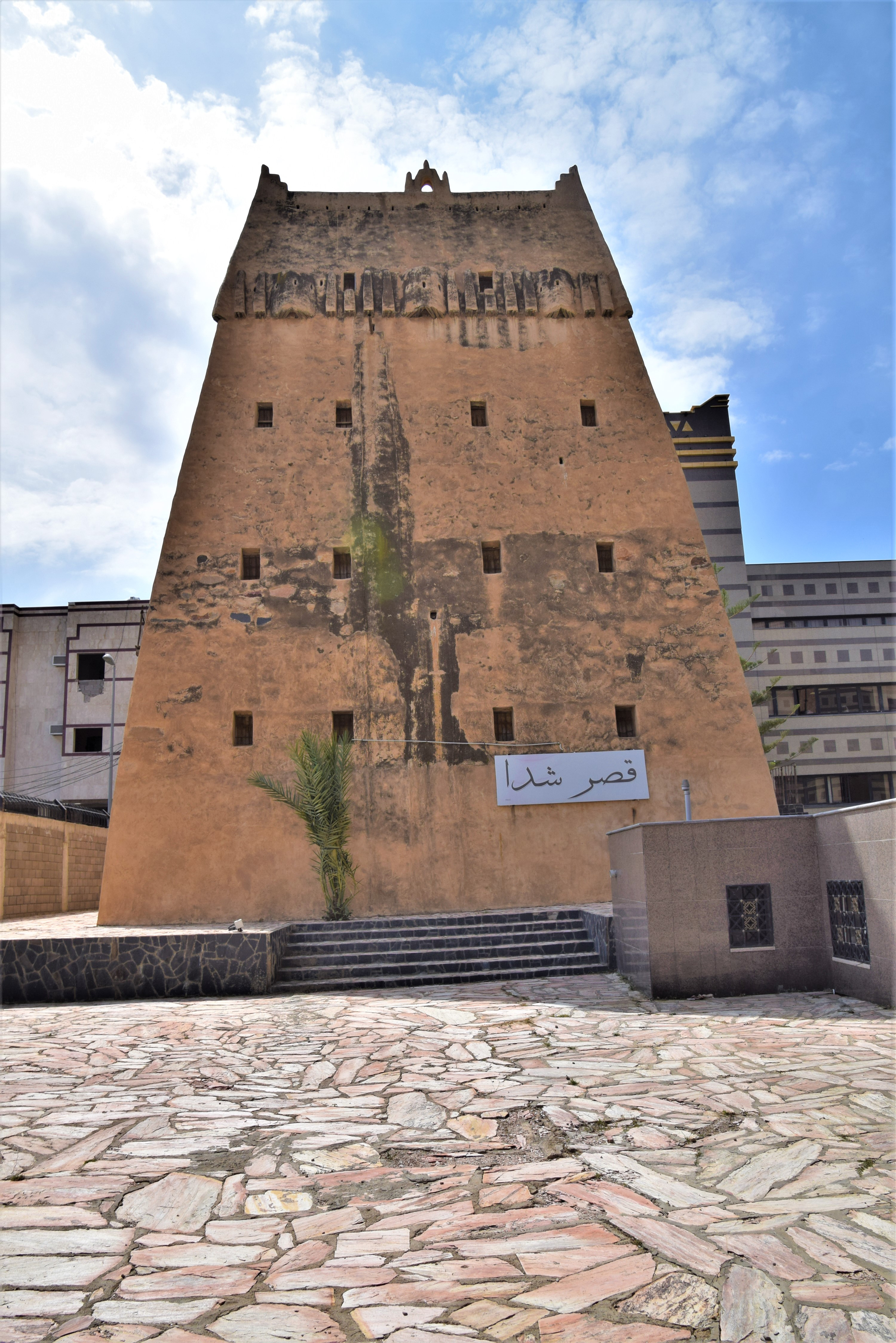
- Shadda Palace
- Alternative names: White Palace

General information
- Type: Palace; museum
- Architectural style: Traditional architecture of Aseer Province
- Location: Abha, Aseer Province, Saudi Arabia
- Completed: 1929

Shadda Palace, also known as the White Palace, is a historic palace and museum in Abha, Aseer Province, Saudi Arabia. Built in 1929 during the reign of King Abdulaziz, it served for a time as the headquarters of the Emirate of Aseer Province. The palace was later restored and converted into a museum of popular heritage.

== History ==
Shadda Palace was built on the direction of King Abdulaziz, who instructed Abdulwahab Abu Malha, then finance official in Abha, to construct the palace. The building was constructed from stone, with its interior and exterior walls covered in plaster.

== Architecture and museum ==
The palace reflects the traditional architecture of Aseer Province. It consists of four floors and narrows toward its upper levels, with wooden doors, windows and ceilings, as well as decorative elements on the upper floor.

After restoration, Shadda Palace was opened as a museum. its rooms display old household objects, local handicrafts, manuscripts, coins and photographs reflecting aspects of life in Abha and the wider Aseer region. In 2017, the palace was included in the National Architectural Heritage Register.

== See also ==
- List of museums in Saudi Arabia
