= Al Qassim Date Festival =

Saudi Arabian date festival

- Status: active
- Frequency: Annually
- Location: Al-Qassim Region of Saudi Arabia

Al Qassim Date Festival is the largest date festival in the world held annually in the central Al Qassim region of Saudi Arabia. It is estimated that about 300,000 tonnes of dates are sold annually. The festival is also accompanied by heritage activities that attract visitors from neighboring countries. Saudi Arabia has the highest number of palm trees in the world representing around 25% of the world's date production. Al Qassim region, where the festival is held, has more than 8 million palm trees.

== See also ==
- Tourism in Saudi Arabia
