= Nasseef House =

Historical structure in Saudi Arabia

- بيت نصيف
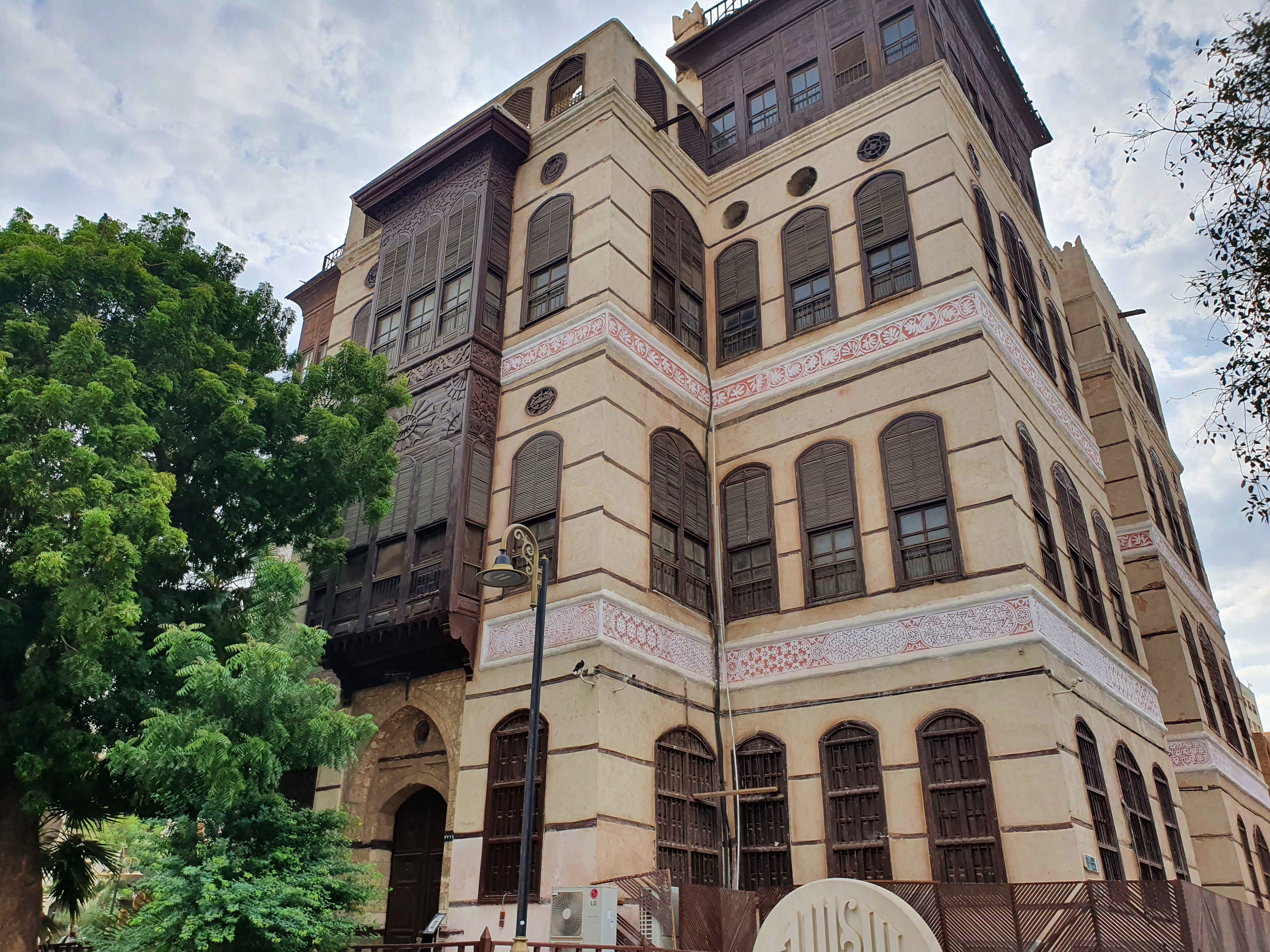
- Nasseef House in 2020
- Interactive map of the Nasseef House area

General information
- Type: Historic house museum
- Location: Al-Balad, Jeddah, Jeddah, Saudi Arabia
- Coordinates: 21°29′02″N 39°11′16″E
- Completed: 1881

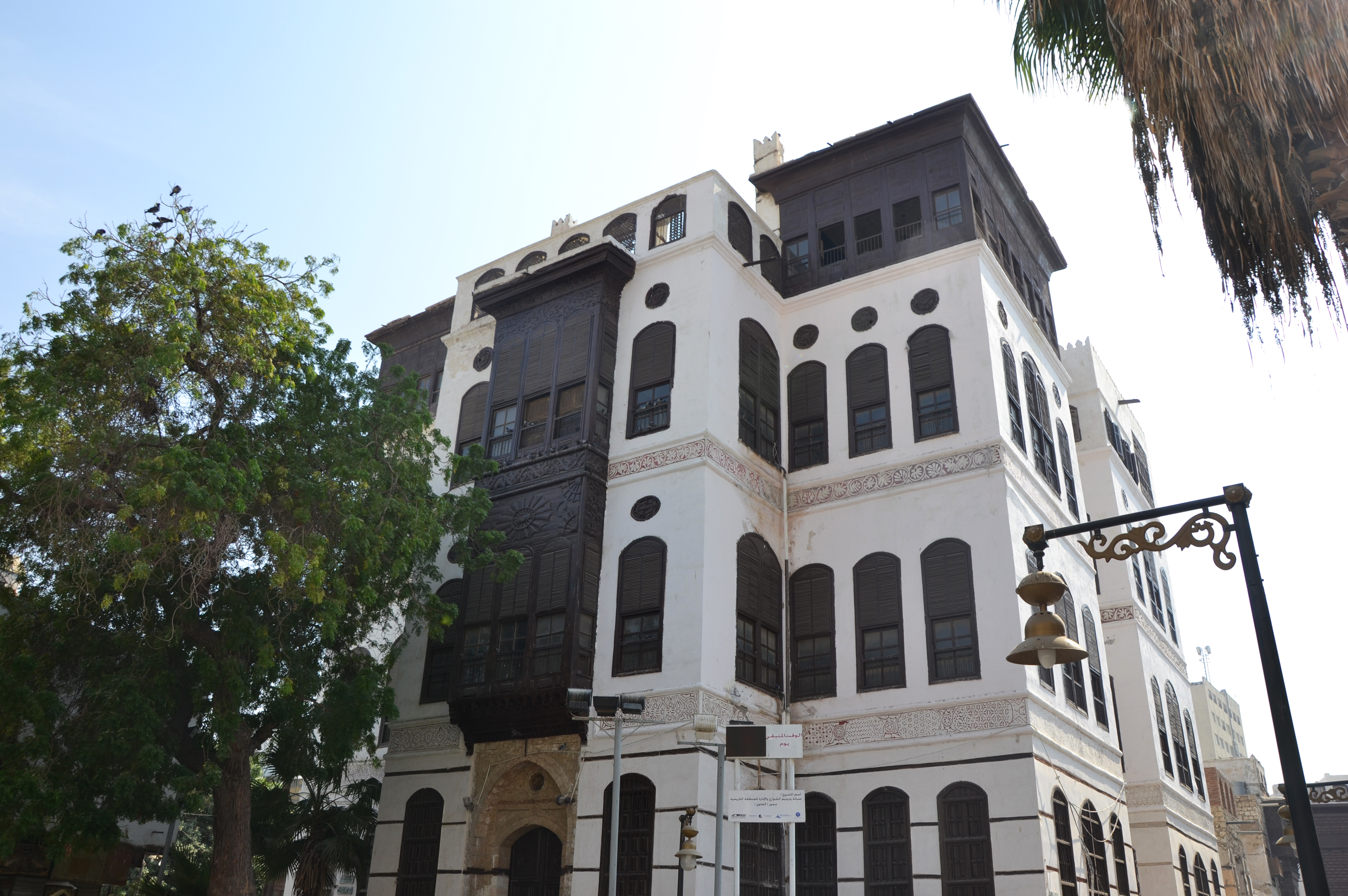
Nasseef House in 2011

Nasseef House or Nassif House is a historic house in Al-Balad, Jeddah, Saudi Arabia. Built between 1872 and 1881 for Omar Nasseef Effendi, it later served as a residence of Abdulaziz Ibn Saud after he entered Jeddah in 1925. The building has since been used as a cultural center for exhibitions and lectures.

== History ==
The construction of Nasseef House on old Jeddah's main street, Suq al-Alawi, began in 1872 and it was finished by 1881 for Omar Nasseef Effendi, member of a wealthy merchant family and, governor of Jeddah at the time. When Abdulaziz Ibn Saud entered the city in December 1925, after the siege of Jeddah, he stayed in the Bayt Nasseef. During his early years in Jeddah, the house served as one of his residences in the city. John R. Bradley, author of Saudi Arabia Exposed: Inside a Kingdom in Crisis, described the Nasseef House as "kind of social salon" in the 1920s, as consuls and merchants gathered there.

The house also included a library containing thousands of books and works in the humanities, which were later donated to King Abdulaziz University.

== Layout and design ==
Nasseef House has 106 rooms, with artworks displayed in some of them. The building includes decoration on wood and tiles, as well as examples of Arabic calligraphy. Its design style has been described as Ottoman Turkish. This rather describes more the period during which it was built than relationship to designs popular in the Umayyad and Abbasids cultural centers at this time such as Baghdad, Cordoba and Damascus . The style is thought to be more related to stylistic elements found along the Red Sea, Egypt and maybe the Levant at that time.

The house has an irregular plan of rectangular rooms arranged around a central hall. The main entrance to the house is from the north, while there is a second entrance from the west, that was used by the women. After climbing a flight of stairs onto a small platform in front of the house, one enters into a large entry hall (dihliz) that opens to the central hall. To the left and right of the entrance hall, there are somewhat smaller rooms, that occupy the northern corners of the house. The west entrance opens straight into the central hall, while several smaller rooms are arranged around a small corridor, that connects to the central hall on the east. Similar a group of rooms occupies the southwest corner of the building. Directly opposite the main entrance hall is a large stairway system. Both the entrance hall in the north and the stairway in the south jut out from the facade as large risalits. Two large bay windows (rawashin), traditional in Jeddah, occupy the front facade above each other, connecting the two levels above the main door with their large wooden structure. There is a second smaller stairway in the southeast corner of the house that may have had more of a service function as further up the kitchen lies in this part of the house.

The layout of the main rooms such as the entry hall in the north with the two smaller corner rooms to its east and west, the central hall and the large stairway are all traced to the floors above. On the fourth floor, there is a large terrace on the outlines of the entry hall, while the rooms to the left and right are built as lofty structures with large windows that are covered with wood lattice from the outside. The terrace itself is screened from view by a wall with many windows. The other parts of this level have normal rooms. The fourth-floor rooms except in the southeastern part are covered by flat roofs in different levels, some usable as terraces. On the fifth floor, the kitchen resides above the main stairway in the middle of the southern part of the building. A light pavilion-like structure rises above the building on the middle eastern part, thus giving the Nasseef house seven floors (depending on how you count some of the intermediate or offset floors). This was used for resting and sleeping in, making the most of cooling breezes at this height.

A motive of grouping elements in threes is found often in the house. This may be a group of three windows or a central doorway with a window or niche on each side. Most official rooms have a symmetrical design with niches on the walls that may correspond to windows or doors on opposite walls. Doors though are more often not arranged in the middle of a wall but rather near corners. The main stairway is fairly wide and the steps are very flat. This is said to have enabled camels to carry provisions to the kitchen on the fifth floor. Even if animals were used to carry heavy loads upstairs, one may consider it easier to direct a donkey around the turns of the stairway. There are two cisterns for water on the ground floor and latrines are provided for each level, while a domed shower can be found on the third floor. Pipes feed the waste water to underground septic tanks.

People used to recognize Nasseef house as "The House with the Tree" because it was the only house in Balad that had one. Obviously, growing a tree was not an easy task because of the scarcity of water. The tree grows on a little square on the north of the house and is a neem tree (Azadirachta indica). This may well be the oldest tree in Jeddah.

A model of the Nasseef House may be viewed in the Jeddah Regional Museum of Archaeology and Ethnography.

== See also ==
- List of museums in Saudi Arabia

== Bibliography ==
- Bradley, John R. Saudi Arabia Exposed: Inside a Kingdom in Crisis. Palgrave Macmillan. 2005.
