= Jad'iyah Museum =

Museum in Saudi Arabia

Coordinates: 25.7915°N 43.5088°E

Jad'iyah Museum is a heritage museum located in Al-Rass Governorate, Al-Qassim Province, Saudi Arabia.

The museum was founded by Khalid bin Mohammed Aljedae. The museum is part of a heritage castle complex built with more than 13,000 mud bricks over foundations of solid rock. The complex includes traditional buildings and rooms, a mosque, and a traditional house known as Bait Aljadah.

The museum contains more than 35,000 heritage artefacts and occupies an area of approximately 7,000 square metres. Its collections document aspects of traditional life in Al-Rass and the wider Qassim region, including occupations, clothing and everyday domestic life.

== See also ==
- List of museums in Saudi Arabia
