= Al-Madinah Museum =

History museum in Medina, Saudi Arabia

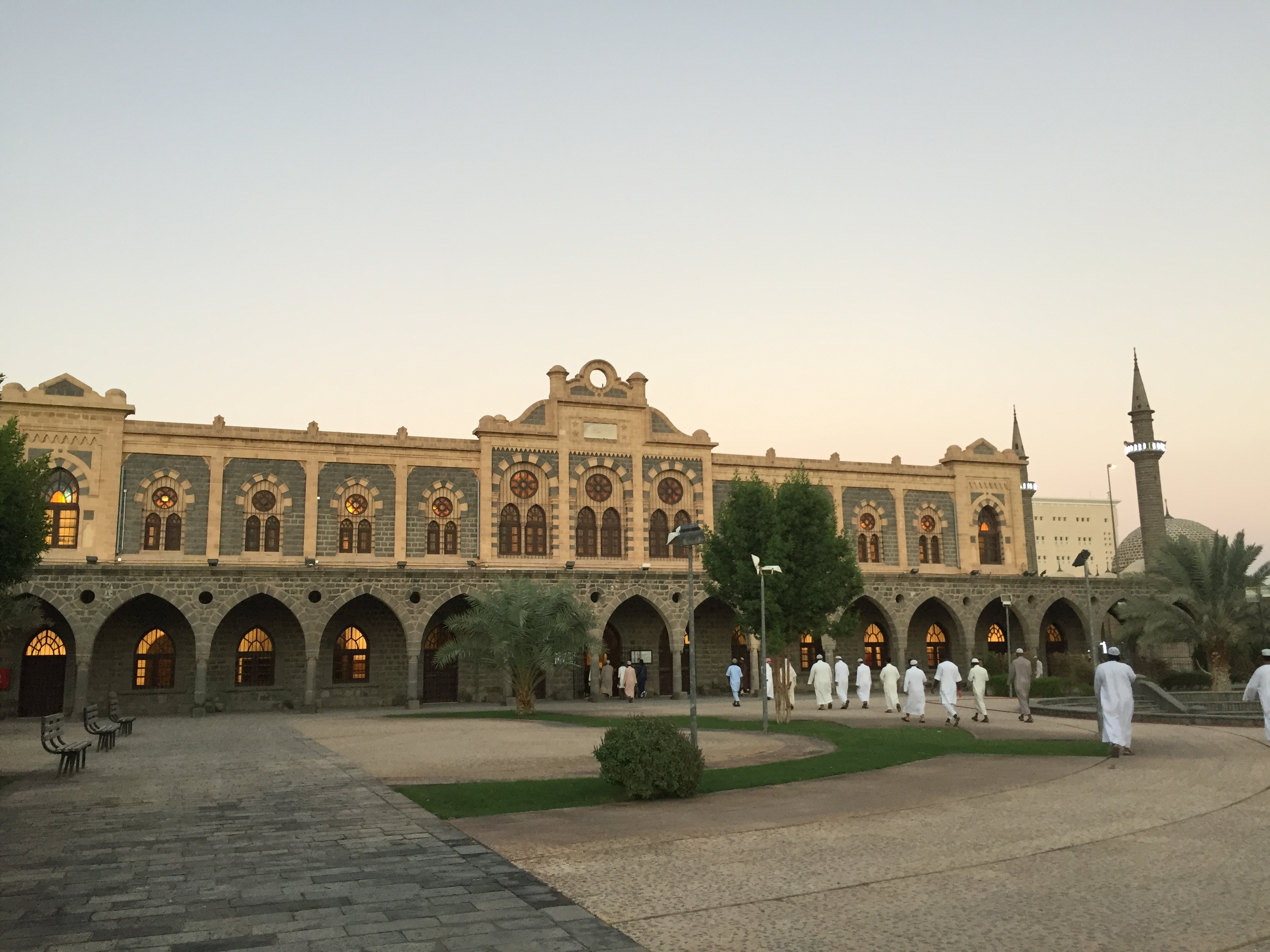
- The museum in 2015
- Established: 1983
- Location: Omar Ibn Alkhtab Rd, As Suqya, Al-Madinah 42315, Saudi Arabia
- Coordinates: 24.461981°N 39.600970°E
- Type: History museum

Al-Madinah Museum (Arabic: متحف المدينة المنورة) is a museum in Al-Madinah, Saudi Arabia, that exhibits Al-Madinah heritage and history featuring different archaeological collections, visual galleries and rare images that related to Al-Medina. The museum exhibits around 2,000 rare artifacts that capture the heritage and culture of Al-Madinah and document the landscape, the people and how it has been shaped over the years. One of the parts of the tour is the evolution of Masjid Nabawi from a house, courtyard, and home to the massive complex that it is now.

== History ==
In 1983, a project was launched to transform Al-Hejaz Railway Station that was established in 1908, into a museum called Al-Madinah Museum, the project also included the establishment of Hejaz Railway Museum in the site. The museum is not to be confused with the privately run Dar al Madinah museum in the Eastern outskirts of the city.

== Halls ==
The museum consists of 14 halls including

- Museum Lobby
- Al-Madina environment, history and nature
- Al-Madina in Prophetic era
- Prophet Mohammed’s wives, his sons and daughters
- Mohajreen (migrants)
- Ansar (supporters)
- Prophetic Mosque
- Al-Madina in the reigns of Caliphs
- Al-Madina in the reign of First Saudi State
- Al-Madina in the reign of Second Saudi State
- Al-Madina in the reign of King Abdul Aziz
- Al-Madina Heritage

== See also ==
- List of museums in Saudi Arabia
- Islamic Dinar Museum
