= Al-Faisal Museum for Arab-Islamic Art =

- متحف الفيصل للفن العربي الإسلامي
- Established: June 1, 2017
- Location: Riyadh, Saudi Arabia
- Coordinates: 24.69146°N 46.68491°E
- Type: Art museum
- Owner: King Faisal Center for Research and Islamic Studies
- Website: Al-Faisal Museum for Arab-Islamic Art

Al-Faisal Museum for Arab-Islamic Art (Arabic: متحف الفيصل للفن العربي الإسلامي) is an art museum in the al-Olaya district of Riyadh, Saudi Arabia, located next to the Al Faisaliah Tower in the building of King Faisal Center for Research and Islamic Studies. Opened in 2017, it features rare collection of Islamic art from early, medieval and contemporary periods and historic Qur'an manuscripts. It also contains artifacts belonging to King Faisal bin Abdulaziz and his wife Princess Iffat Al Thunayan.

The museum is tasked with managing collections, providing research and studies, binding and restoration of manuscripts, and organizing exhibitions and events.

== History ==
The museum was opened in June 2017 and was inaugurated by Prince Faisal bin Bandar, the governor of Riyadh. On the day of its opening, the museum held the "Masahif Al-Amsar" Exhibition, showcasing collection of rare Qur'an manuscripts.

In February 2019, Minister of Culture Prince Badr bin Abdullah inaugurated the "Wahj: Adornment of the Page" exhibition, which lasted till January 2021. The exhibition showcased 60 items of the different types of decorated manuscripts preserved by the King Faisal Center for Research and Islamic Studies.

In February 2022, the First Exhibition Hall was reopened after renovation and the museum held an exhibition titled "Asfār: Treasures of King Faisal Center for Research and Islamic Studies" where 36 out of 28500 historical manuscripts of Qur'an where selected to be displayed. In November 2022, it displayed two rare printed works from its collection, replacing two displayed printed works on Asfar Exhibition “The Bible” (King James Version of the Bible) and “The Holy Bible” (The first edition in Arabic with the four Gospels).

== Permanent collection ==
The permanent exhibition at the al-Faisal Museum for Arab-Islamic Art includes a range of collections, such as the Arab-Islamic Art Collection, the Manuscripts Collection, the King Faisal Memorial Collection, the Coins and Currencies Collection, the Fine Arts Collection, and the History Collection of the center.

The Arab-Islamic Art Collection consists of more than five hundred artifacts from various regions, representing the Islamic civilization from the seventh century to the modern era. This collection includes writing instruments, weapons, ceramics, medical tools, metalwork, wooden sculptures, coins, and textiles. Items from this collection are displayed in the First Exhibition Hall (the permanent exhibition) under the title The Narrative of Arab-Islamic Civilization..

The King Faisal Center Library holds a unique collection of approximately 28,500 original manuscripts, along with over 140,000 digital images of manuscripts and microfiche or microfilm copies. This includes 15,000 microfiche copies acquired from the British Library in 1999 and around 8,000 manuscripts on microfilm from the National French Library, obtained through UNESCO in 1989.

The King Faisal Memorial Collection includes approximately six hundred items from the personal belongings of King Faisal bin Abdulaziz. These items encompass medals, clothing, armor, documents, furniture, and weapons. The Coins and Currencies Collection features coins and banknotes that once belonged to Iffat Al Thunayan, the wife of King Faisal. The Fine Arts Collection comprises approximately six hundred works of fine arts, such as paintings and photographs.
