= Naila Art Gallery =

Art gallery in Riyadh, Saudi Arabia

- معرض نايلا للفنون
- Established: 2012
- Location: Riyadh, Saudi Arabia
- Coordinates: 24°42′07.3″N 46°39′58.7″E
- Type: art gallery
- Website: gallerynaila.com

The Naila Art Gallery (Arabic: معرض نايلا للفنون) is an art gallery in Riyadh, Saudi Arabia.

== History ==
The gallery was opened in 2012.

== Activities ==
The gallery hosts educational programs such as lectures, seminars and workshops.

Naila Art Gallery has hosted exhibitions of contemporary, craft and Islamic art. In 2022, it held Saudi Crafts, an exhibition organized for Saudi National Day that brought together Saudi studios, artists and artisanal brands. In 2023, it hosted Qur'aniyat, a Ramadan exhibition combining calligraphy and Islamic art.

== See also ==
- Culture of Saudi Arabia
