= The Two Holy Mosques Architecture Exhibition =

Museum in Makkah, Saudi Arabia

Coordinates: 21.434587°N 39.754652°E

Two Holy Mosques Architecture Exhibition
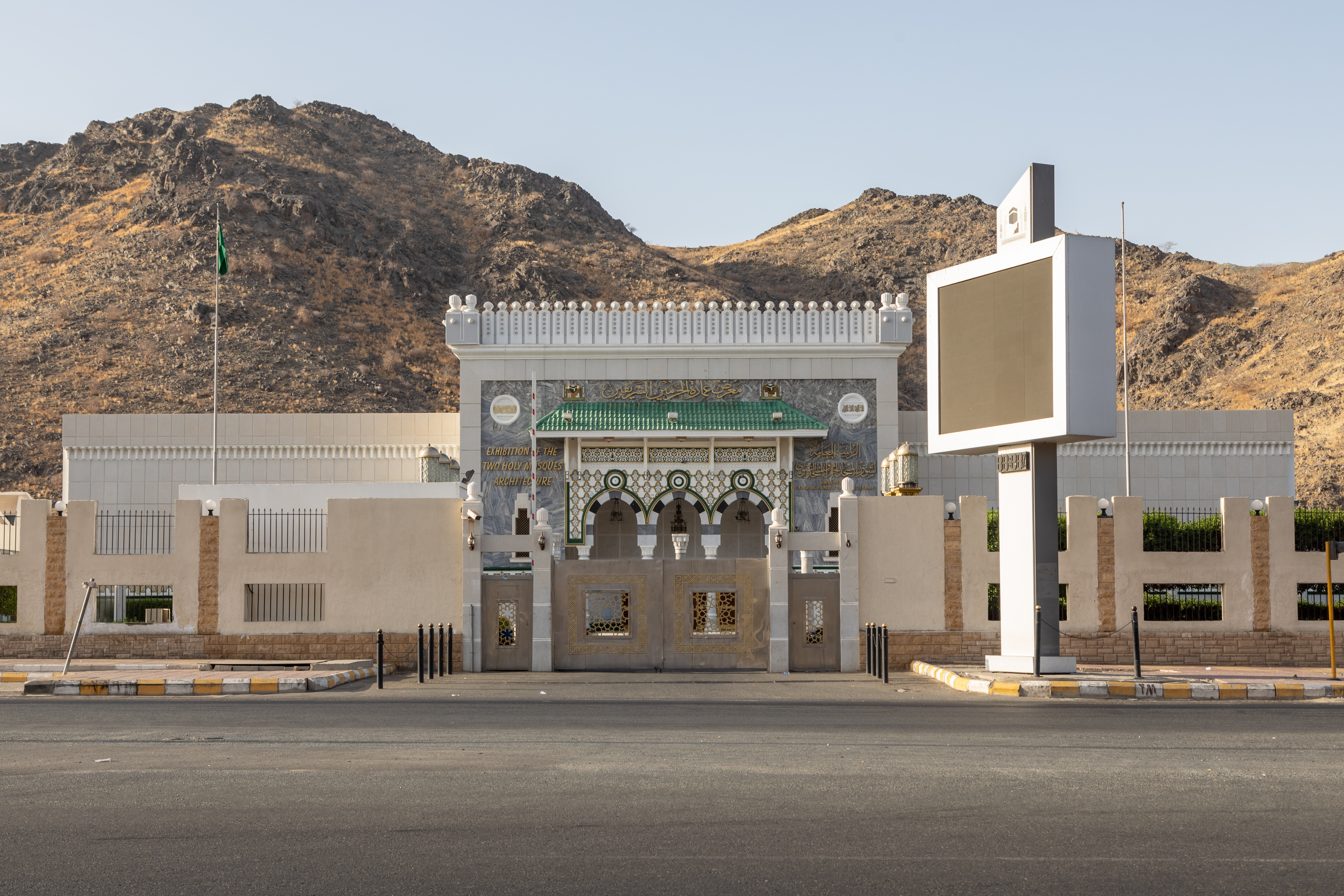
- One of the exhibition halls

The Two Holy Mosques Architecture Exhibition (Arabic: متحف الحرمين الشريفين) is located in Um al-Joud area, near the Kiswa Factory. Since its establishment it has become one of the most popular destinations in Makkah, Saudi Arabia. It was established in February 2000 during the late King Fahd bin Abdulaziz era.

== Objective ==
The main aim of the exhibition is to give the Muslim community an overall information on the history of unique architectural designs of the two holy mosques.

== Exhibits ==
The museum holds a large number of exhibit items, some of these are listed below:

- Wooden Pillar of Kaaba: dating back to circa 65 AH, installed during the reign of Abdullah b. al-Zubayr.
- Mizab Rehma: a water spout of Kaaba dating back to 1021 AH, bearing the name of Sultan Mahmud Khan.
- Kaaba's Wooden Ladder: dates back to 1240 AH,
- Door of the Kaaba: dates back to 1363 AH,
- Models of the Two Holy Mosques: detailed models of Masjid al-Nabawi and Masjid al-Haram.
- A number of Manuscripts

== See also ==
- List of museums in Saudi Arabia
