= Red Sea Museum =

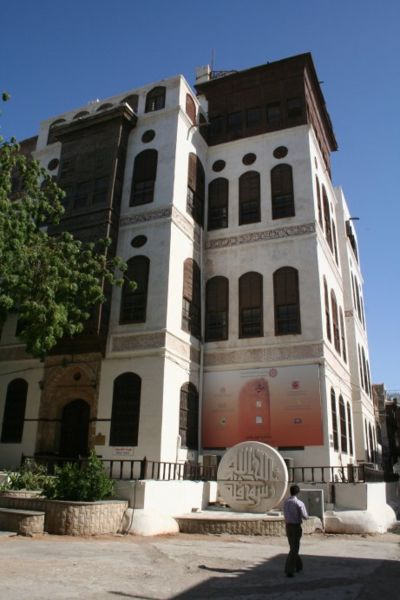
- Established: September 20, 2020
- Location: Al-Balad, Jeddah, Saudi Arabia
- Founder: Ministry of Culture

The Red Sea Museum (RSM) is a historical and cultural museum located in the Bab al-Bunt Building in Historic Jeddah, Saudi Arabia. The museum was announced by the Saudi Ministry of Culture in September 2020 as part of the Quality of Life Program, one of the initiatives of Saudi Vision 2030, and officially opened on 6 December 2025.

== Building ==
The museum occupies the restored Bab al-Bunt building, which was originally built in 1866 and served as a sea gateway for pilgrims and other travellers arriving in Jeddah. According to the museum's director, Eman Zidan, the restoration was based on a study by architects and heritage specialists and reused original materials such as coral stone.

== Overview ==
The museum focuses on the history of maritime navigation, trade, geology, pilgrimage (Hajj), cultural diversity, and other distinctive cultural elements that have shaped the identities of Jeddah, Mecca, and Medina throughout history. It presents the Red Sea region as a crossroads of civilizations and highlights the human interaction and cultural exchange that emerged from the journeys of pilgrims and traders arriving from different parts of the world.

The museum serves as a cultural platform that documents the aesthetic and heritage values of coastal cities along the Red Sea, emphasizing their historical role and cultural influence. It also offers an interpretive narrative that reflects the interaction between diverse cultures, traditions, and social practices associated with pilgrimage and trade routes.

== Collections and exhibitions ==
The museum houses rare artifacts, manuscripts, photographs, and books that collectively document the history of the Bab al-Bunt Building as a key historical gateway connecting the Red Sea coast residents with the wider world, and as the main entry point for pilgrims, merchants, and travelers to the city of Jeddah.

The museum features more than 100 contemporary artworks and hosts approximately four temporary exhibitions annually. It also offers educational programs for visitors of all ages.

The museum's permanent exhibitions include more than 1,000 archaeological and artistic artifacts displayed across seven thematic sections within 23 exhibition halls. These exhibitions are presented using a contemporary curatorial approach that integrates historical narrative with interactive experiences.

The museum houses a wide range of archaeological artifacts and rare historical objects, including Chinese porcelain, oud incense burners, coral specimens, jewelry, navigational instruments, maps, manuscripts, and photographs, in addition to modern works by Saudi and international artists.

The museum's inaugural temporary exhibition was The Gate of Gates by the Saudi artist Moath Alofi, curated by Philippe Cardinal.[6][7]
