= Islamic Dinar Museum =

Islamic Dinar Museum متحف الدينار الإسلامي
- Location: Mecca, Saudi Arabia
- Type: History museum

The Islamic Dinar Museum (Arabic: متحف الدينار الإسلامي) is a historical museum located in Mecca, Saudi Arabia. It is one of the distinguished private museums that highlights the monetary history of the Islamic world and Saudi Arabia across different eras.

== Description ==
The Islamic Dinar Museum was founded by Mohammed Natto in Mecca. It is located in the Hijrah District, facing Jabal Thawr.

It provides a documented monetary history illustrating the evolution of the currency system—from the earliest Islamic coins to the introduction of Saudi currency. The museum shows a link between different historical periods by assembling both ancient and modern coins.

== Collection ==
The museum contains gold, silver, and copper coins; paper currency; and various heritage items related to the history of Mecca and Saudi Arabia. It houses thousands of coins—dinars and dirhams—dating back to different periods of Islamic history, including the Umayyad and Abbasid eras, as well as pre-Islamic times. It also features modern Saudi currency, both coins and banknotes issued since the founding of the kingdom, making it a living record of the evolution of currency in Saudi Arabia over time.

The museum also includes historical documents, stones, old household tools, pottery items, and pieces of antique furniture.

== See also ==
- List of museums in Saudi Arabia
