= Saqr Al Jazeera Aviation Museum =

- متحف صقر الجزيرة للطيران
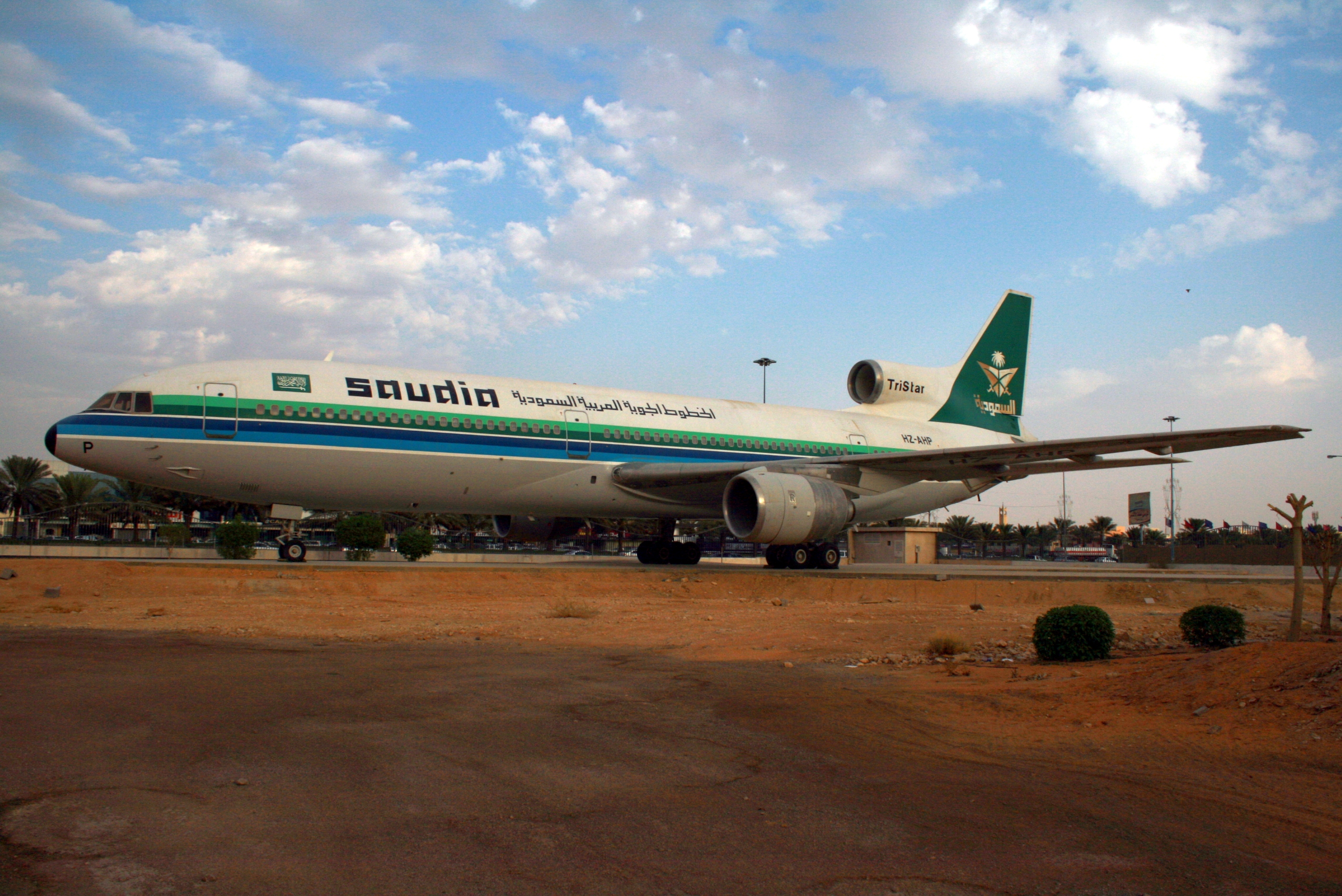
- Saudia Lockheed L-1011 Tristar gate guard
- Established: 24 January 1999
- Location: Riyadh, Saudi Arabia
- Coordinates: 24.7538°N 46.7392°E
- Type: Aviation museum

The Saqr Al Jazeera Aviation Museum (or Royal Saudi Air Force Museum) Arabic: متحف صقر الجزيرة للطيران) is located on the East Ring Road of Riyadh between exits 10 and 11. A Lockheed L-1011 Tristar formerly operated by Saudia serves as a gate guard visible from the ring road.

== Overview ==
Established on 24 January 1999, the Saqr Al Jazeera Aviation Museum was named after King Abdulaziz's honorific title, which translated to Falcon of the Peninsula. The museum presents the history of the Royal Saudi Air Force from its establishment in the 1920s to the present day. It first exhibited flight training simulator equipment, touch-screen computer systems displaying historical events and former aircraft, and a space corner dedicated to Prince Sultan bin Salman. The museum comprises an outdoor static park and a large and modern indoor museum.

On 13 May 2008, Major General Thomas Beckett visited the museum, meeting Head of the Air Force Supply and Provision Authority, Major General Mohammed Al-Zouri, and director of the museum, Technical Brigadier Nasser Al-Saffar.

== Static park ==
Aircraft on display include:

- BAC Lightning T-55
- BAC Strikemaster Mk80
- Boeing 707 in Saudia livery
- Boeing F-15D Eagle
- Cessna 310
- Douglas A-26B Invader
- Douglas DC-4
- Lockheed C-130 Hercules
- Lockheed L-1011 Tristar in Saudia livery
- Lockheed T-33A Shooting Star
- Panavia Tornado ADV F3 & IDS
- North American T-6 Texan
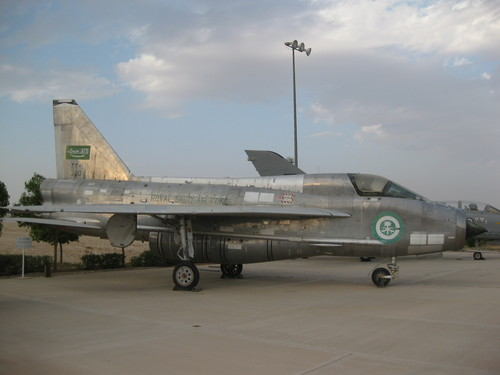
BAC Lightning T55

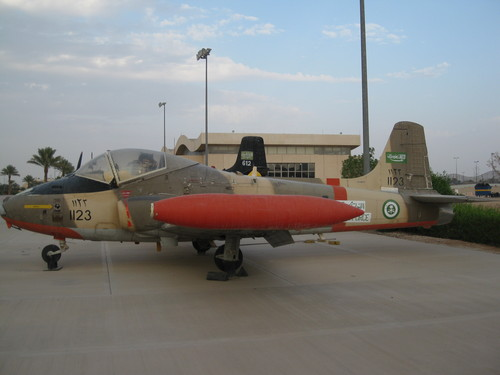
BAC Strikemaster Mk80

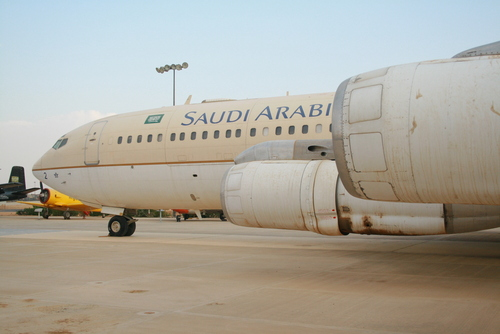
Boeing 707 HZ-HM2

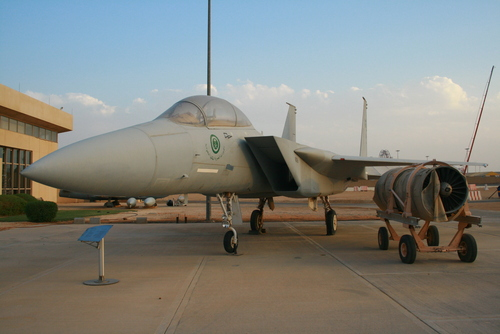
F-15D Eagle

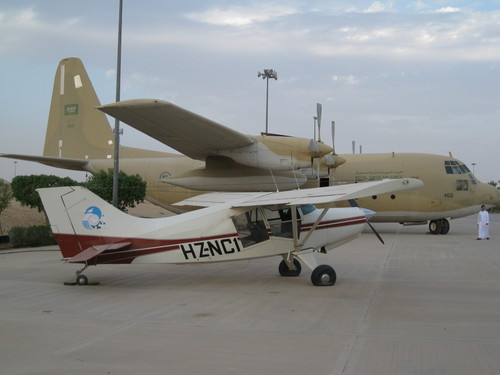
Maule M-6 and C-130 Hercules

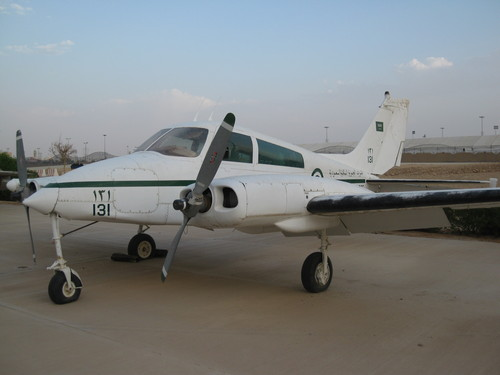
Cessna 310

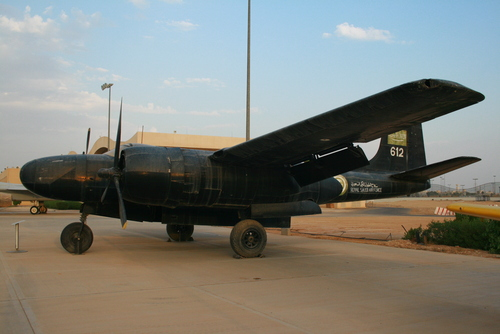
A-26B Invader

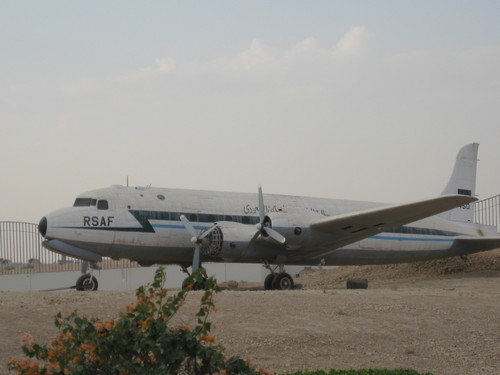
Douglas DC-4

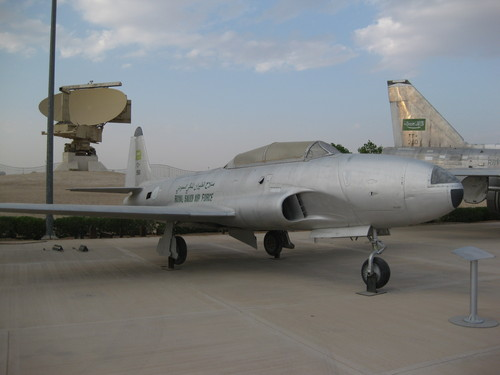
T-33 Shooting Star

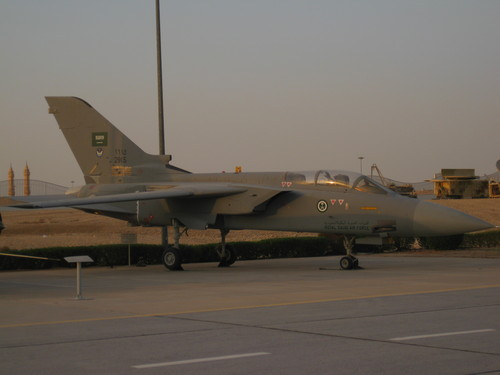
Tornado ADV F3

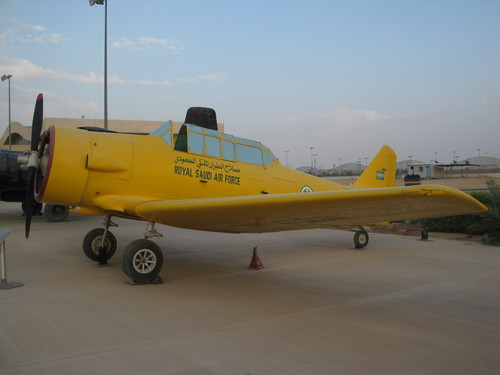
T-6 Texan

== Display halls ==
The display halls contain exhibits on the history of the RSAF, aircraft engines and weaponry, uniforms, insignia and decorations and a special display on Prince Sultan bin Salman bin Abdulaziz Al Saud, the first Saudi in space, who served as a payload specialist on the Space Shuttle Discovery during mission STS-51-G.

Aircraft on display include:

- BAC Lightning F53
- Bell UH-1
- Bell OH-58
- de Havilland Chipmunk Mk 10
- de Havilland Vampire FB Mk 52
- Douglas DC-3 outfitted to represent the aircraft given by President Franklin D. Roosevelt to King Ibn Saud in 1945
- Hawker Hunter F Mk60
- North American F-86F Sabre
- Northrop F-5E Tiger II
- North American T-6 Texan
- Temco T-35 Buckaroo

== See also ==
- List of aerospace museums
- List of museums in Saudi Arabia
- Museums in Riyadh
