= Tourism Development Fund =

Saudi government tourism fund

- صندوق التنمية السياحي

Agency overview
- Formed: June 2020; 6 years ago
- Jurisdiction: Government of Saudi Arabia
- Agency executives: Ahmed Al Khateeb, Chairman of the Board; Qusai Al-Fakhri, Chief Executive Officer
- Parent agency: National Development Fund
- Website: tdf.gov.sa/en/

The Tourism Development Fund (TDF; Arabic: صندوق التنمية السياحي) is a Saudi government investment fund established to support financing and investment in the tourism sector in Saudi Arabia. The fund was established by royal order in June 2020 with capital of US$4 billion, equivalent to SAR 15 billion, as part of Saudi Arabia's efforts to develop tourism and diversify its economy. It aims to facilitate access for local and international investors to tourism investments across key destinations in the Kingdom.

The fund provides financing and investment support for tourism-related projects and works with public- and private-sector partners, including banks and financing institutions. It is organizationally linked to the National Development Fund.

== History ==
The Tourism Development Fund was established in June 2020 by royal order during the development of Saudi Arabia's tourism sector. Its establishment followed the creation of the Ministry of Tourism earlier in 2020 and formed part of wider government efforts to expand the tourism industry and diversify the national economy.

At the time of its launch, Reuters reported that the fund had an initial capital of US$4 billion and would establish equity and debt investment vehicles to support the development of tourism projects in cooperation with private and investment banks. The fund was created during a period in which Saudi Arabia was seeking to increase tourism investment and develop the sector as part of its economic diversification plans.

== Mandate and activities ==
The Tourism Development Fund's mandate is to support the development of Saudi Arabia's tourism sector by facilitating access to financing and investment for tourism-related projects. Its work is focused on enabling private-sector participation in the tourism industry and supporting projects that contribute to the development of destinations, accommodation, services, and tourism infrastructure.

The fund provides financing solutions for investors and tourism businesses, including support for small and medium-sized enterprises and larger tourism projects. Its activities include providing funding solutions, working with banks and financing institutions, and coordinating with government entities, operators, and service providers to help bring tourism investments into implementation.

The fund's role is also connected to the National Tourism Strategy, which seeks to increase tourism's contribution to the Saudi economy and expand investment in the sector. Through its financing and partnership activities, the fund supports projects intended to develop tourism destinations and improve the availability of tourism services across the Kingdom.

== Financing and investment role ==
The Tourism Development Fund acts as a financing enabler for tourism projects in Saudi Arabia. Its role includes providing direct and indirect financing, supporting access to credit, and working with banks and other financing partners to support private-sector investment in tourism. The fund's financing activities are aimed at projects connected with accommodation, hospitality, tourism services, and tourism infrastructure.

At its launch, the fund was expected to establish equity and debt investment vehicles to support tourism development in cooperation with private and investment banks. In September 2020, the fund signed an agreement with Riyad Bank and Banque Saudi Fransi to establish financing programs for tourism projects with a value of up to SAR 160 billion.

The fund has also been involved in financing individual tourism and hospitality projects. In 2021, Reuters reported that the fund had deployed SAR 2 billion into tourism projects worth a total of about SAR 6 billion from its establishment until the end of September 2021. The fund has also signed project-level financing agreements, including financing connected with the Knowledge City Forum project in Medina.

The fund's financing model includes products for investors and tourism businesses. These include debt financing for large tourism projects and programs developed with commercial banks to support small and medium-sized enterprises and private tourism projects. One example is the Tourism Partners Program with Riyad Bank, which provides financing solutions to support tourism investment and private tourism projects.

The Organisation for Economic Co-operation and Development has described the fund as the entity responsible for funding major tourism projects and supporting the private sector in developing tourism offerings and accommodation.

== Regional projects and partnerships ==
The Tourism Development Fund has signed financing and partnership agreements for tourism and hospitality projects in different regions of Saudi Arabia. These agreements have included projects connected with eco-lodges, hospitality developments, tourism infrastructure, and regional tourism investment.

In 2023, the fund signed a financing agreement with Golden Frond Hotel Services Company, a subsidiary of Afyaa Group, to develop the ENVI Al Nakheel ecolodge in Al-Ahsa Oasis. The project was presented as part of efforts to support sustainable tourism development and expand accommodation offerings in the Kingdom.

The fund has also announced regional initiatives outside the main tourism centres. In 2024, it said that it had enabled 17 tourism projects in the Eastern Province, with SAR 12.6 billion in investments and 2,140 hotel rooms. In the same year, the fund signed a memorandum of understanding with the Unaizah Tourism Cooperative Association to support tourism projects, infrastructure, and entrepreneurship in Al-Qassim.

In 2025, the fund announced a group of tourism projects and private-sector partnerships at TOURISE 2025, including projects in the Aseer region and other destinations. The announced projects included hotel, resort, and mixed-use tourism developments intended to expand the supply of tourism accommodation and experiences.
