= Al-Zaher Palace Museum =

Museum in Mecca, Saudi Arabia

- متحف مكة المكرمة
- Location within Saudi Arabia
- Established: 1944; 82 years ago
- Location: Makkah, Saudi Arabia
- Coordinates: 21.446143°N 39.807972°E
- Type: History museum
- Collections: History of Makkah, Saudi archaeology, and Islamic heritage

Al-Zaher Palace Museum in Makkah, Saudi Arabia, is a historical museum that exhibits the history of Makkah and various archaeological collections for different periods of Islamic history in the region. It has an area of 2,700 m^{2}, covering two storeys and the surrounding gardens. It was built in an Islamic architectural style with cut and carved stone.

== History ==
Al-Zaher Palace was constructed in 1944. It was one of the headquarters for King Abdul Aziz in Makkah where he met the delegates of Muslim pilgrims from different Islamic countries.

The palace initially served as a guesthouse. In 1958, it became the premises of Al-Zaher Elementary School, before being renovated and converted into a museum of antiquities and heritage in 2006.

== Museum Halls ==
The museum consists of 15 halls, including:

- Pre-Islam Hall
- The Kingdom's Antiquities Hall
- The Holy Quran Hall
- The Prophet's Biography Hall
- Hajj Hall
- The Holy Mosque's Architecture Hall
- Makkah Heritage Hall
- Islamic Civilization Exhibits Hall

The Kingdom's Antiquities Hall displays rock inscriptions, fortresses, Hajj routes, and archaeological finds from across Saudi Arabia. The Hajj Hall includes historical photographs and maps of pilgrimage routes, while the Holy Mosque's Architecture Hall traces the development of the Grand Mosque and contains a model of the complex.

== See also ==
- List of museums in Saudi Arabia
