= Hejaz Railway Museum =

Museum in Medina, Saudi Arabia

Coordinates: 24°27′42.01″N 39°36′0.69″E

- متحف سكة الحجاز
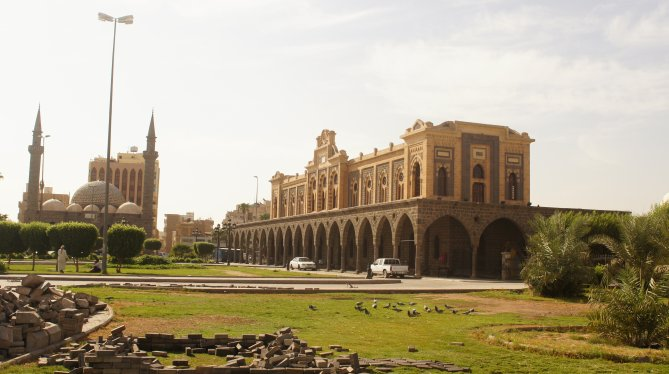
- A side view of the museum
- Location: Medina, Saudi Arabia
- Type: History museum

The Hejaz Railway Museum (Arabic: متحف سكة الحجاز) is a railway museum in Medina, Saudi Arabia. It opened in 2006 and is located on the grounds of the restored Ottoman railway station in Medina. The museum includes part of the historic Hejaz Railway track, a train shed, locomotives and other rolling stock. Some exhibits were moved to the museum from other locations along the historic railway line. The museum at the Mada'in Saleh Railway Station has been converted into The Chedi Hegra Hotel, the track and locomotive can still be viewed.

== Site and collection ==
The museum occupies the former Hejaz Railway station complex in the Anbariyah area of Medina, near the Prophet's Mosque. The station was the final stop of the Hejaz Railway and included several buildings that served the railway. The museum presents the history and heritage of Medina and includes railway-related objects, restored trains, carriages and tools used at the station.

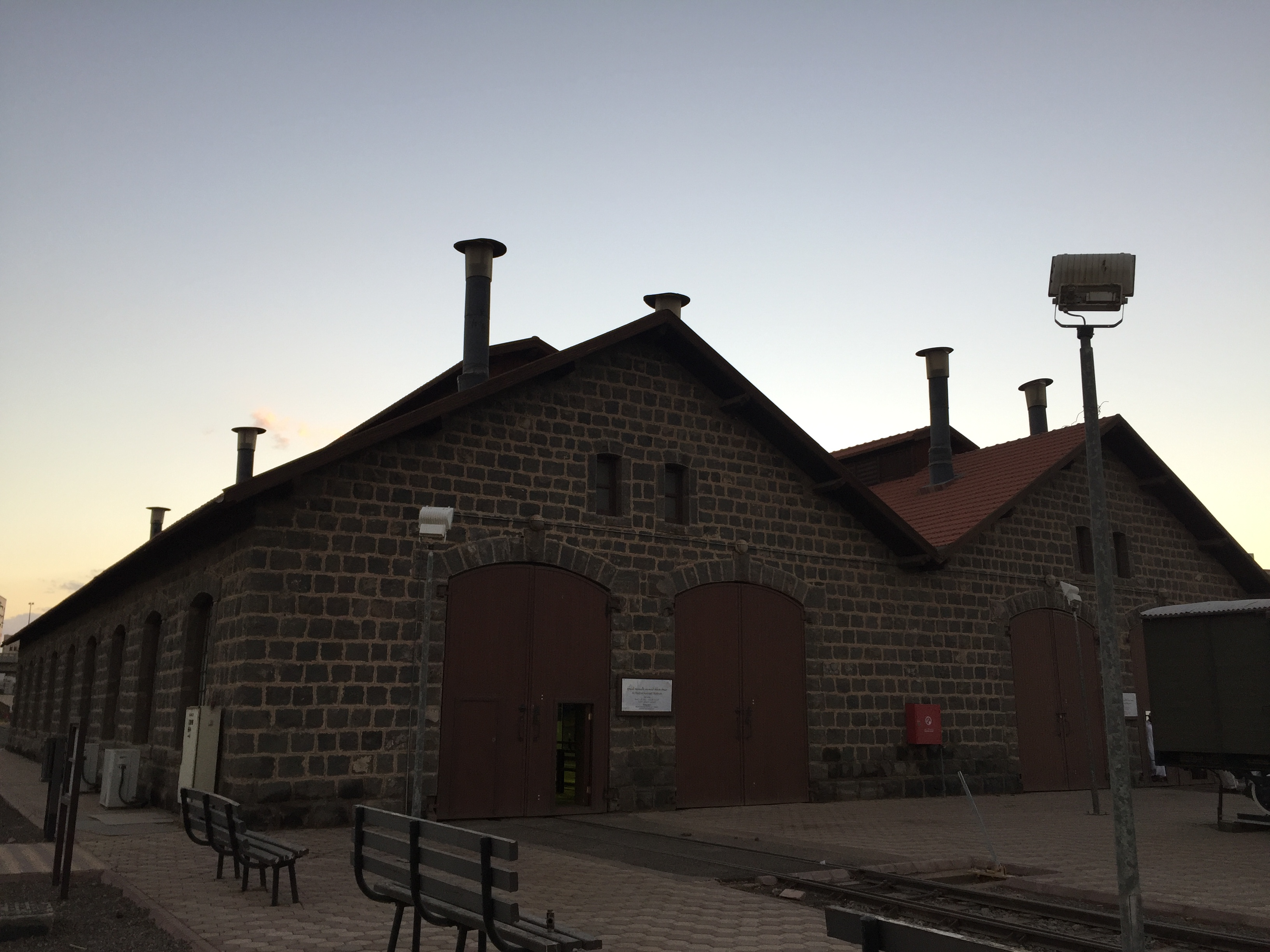
part of the museum

It is currently (2026) closed for refurbishment.

== See also ==
- Hejaz Railway
- Hejaz Railway Station (Damascus)
- List of museums in Saudi Arabia
