= Khuzam Palace =

Palace and museum in Jeddah, Saudi Arabia

Jeddah Regional Museum of Archaeology and Ethnography
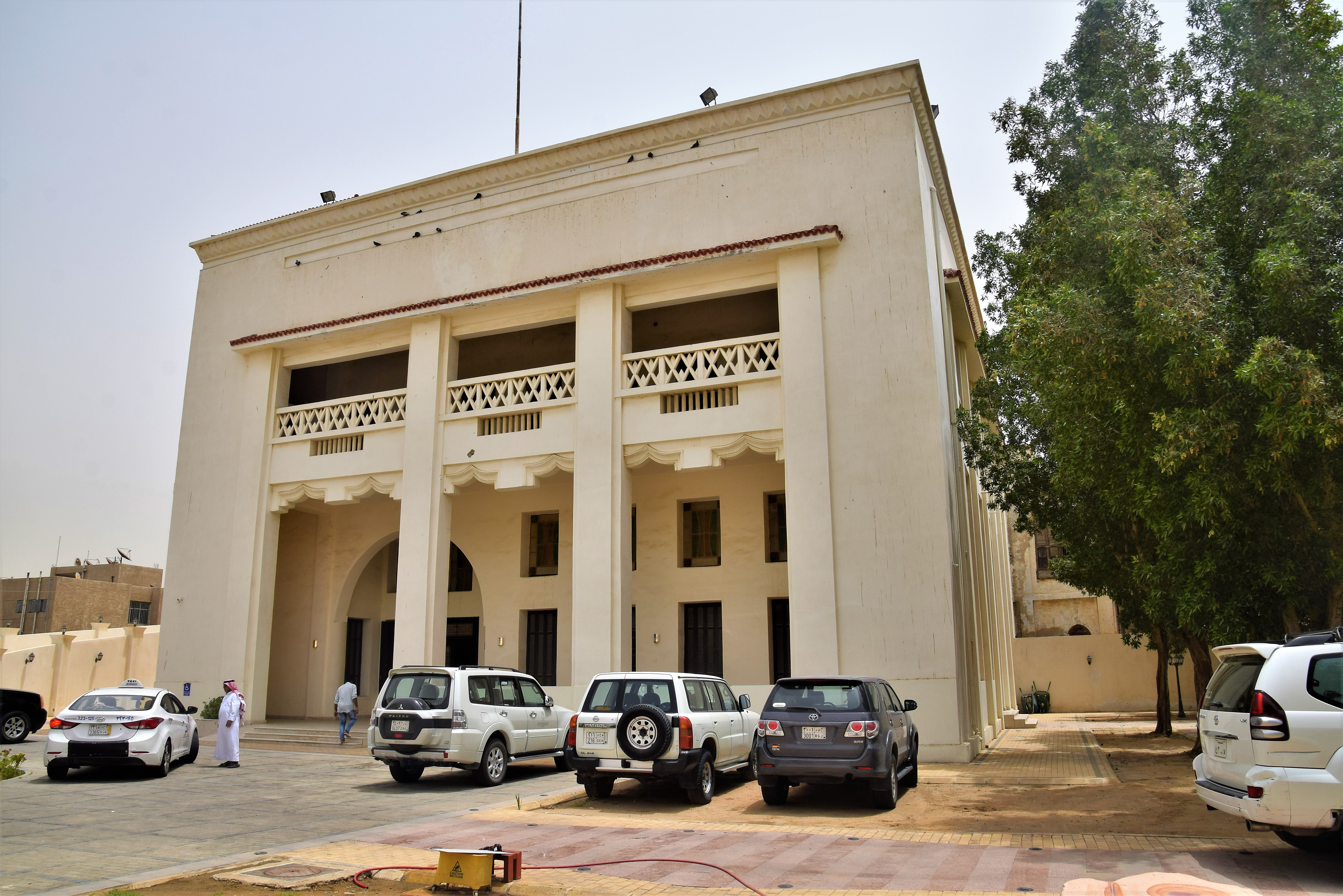
- Location: Saudi Arabia
- Coordinates: 21°28′25″N 39°12′24″E
- Location of Khuzam Palace

The Khuzam Palace is a major palace and museum in Jeddah, Saudi Arabia. It houses the Jeddah Regional Museum of Archaeology and Ethnography.

== History and the building ==
The Museum is in the historic Khuzam Palace in the Al-Nuzlah al-Yamaniyah quarter in the south of Jeddah. The building was constructed as a royal palace from 1928 to 1932 under the supervision of Muhammed bin Laden. The oil agreement with the Standard Oil Company of California was signed by Abdullah Suleiman on behalf of Saudi Arabia and Lloyd N. Hamilton on behalf of the company in Khuzam Palace, Jeddah, in 1933.

Dar Al-Arkan Real Estate (DAAR) have been commissioned to develop the area on 11 October 2008 by the Custodian of the Two Holy Mosques.

== The exhibitions ==
The collection ranges from artefacts of the Stone Age attributed to the Acheulean period found in nearby Wadi Fatimah over items of several pre-Islamic cultures and items illustrating the rise of Islam to relicts from the time the palace was used by the royal family. A second collection holds ethnographic items portraying the recent culture of the region.

== See also ==
- List of museums in Saudi Arabia
