= Ricardo Karam =

Lebanese television presenter, producer, talk-show host, author and public speaker

- ريكاردو كرم
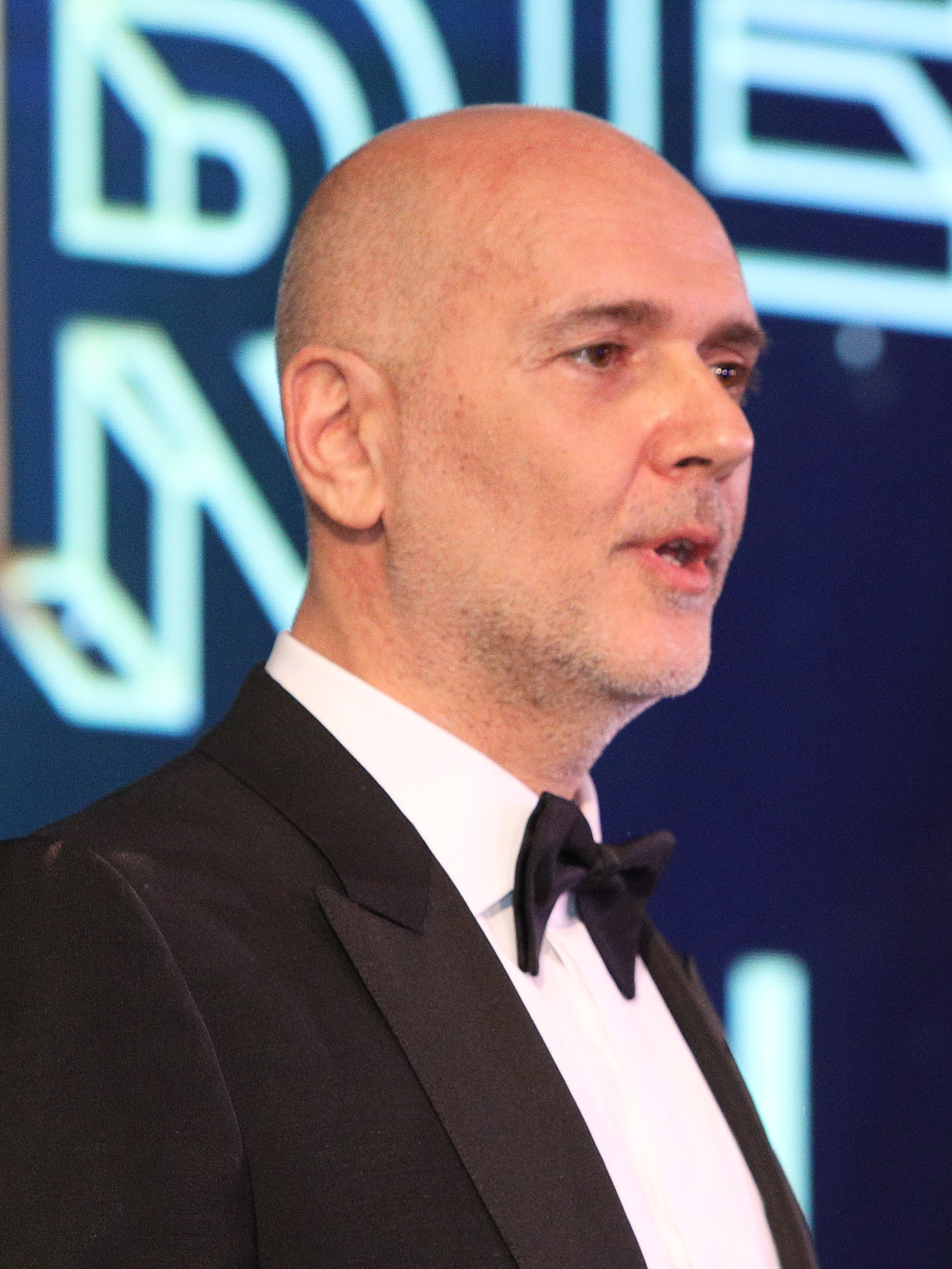
- Ricardo Karam speech in 2023
- Born: May 18; San Félix (Venezuela)
- Education: American University of Beirut (1991); ENSAIA (1993); Lebanese American University (1995)
- Occupation: Media personality
- Spouse: Youmna Camille Ziade
- Children: 3
- Website: ricardokaram.com takreem.org

Ricardo Karam (Arabic: ريكاردو كرم) is a Lebanese television presenter, producer, talk-show host, author and public speaker. Over the years, he has created several shows, series and documentaries, and founded RK Productions which has taken charge of producing all his projects, as well as Takreem, Takreem USA and TAKminds. A member of AUB Board of Trustees since 2023.

== Career ==
Karam began his career as an apprentice in the early days of the Lebanese radio station Magic 102. He went on to earn a degree in Chemical Engineering and a master's in business administration at the American University of Beirut and the Lebanese American University respectively.

His first television appearance was in 1992 with Focus on Télé Liban. Since then, Karam produced several talk shows, series, and documentaries in Arabic, English, and French. and he has interviewed many prominent figures such as Dalai Lama, Bill Gates, Farah Diba Pahlavi, Luciano Pavarotti, Abbé Pierre, Valentino, Andre Agassi and Zaha Hadid.

He published his first book Privileged Encounters in 2000 where he revisits his interviews between 1996 and 2000. In 2005, he published Le Paris Libanais in which he discusses 30 years of history between France and Lebanon, including the Lebanese conflict and the Lebanese Civil War.

In 2020, he launched his own podcast series Conversations with Ricardo Karam unveiling exclusive interviews and revisiting old favorites.

At the end of 2021 and on the 100th anniversary of the founding of the Military Academy, Ricardo was asked to host the heads of the security services in a TV Special.

== Spokesmanship ==
Ricardo Karam regularly leads seminars and cultural, economic or media forums, both in Lebanon and abroad. He has been a speaker, moderator and panelist at conferences in several countries.

When former Renault–Nissan–Mitsubishi Alliance CEO Carlos Ghosn was arrested in Japan in 2018, Karam had been a journalistic witness and chronicler of the case and had worked with many news organizations such as the New York Times, Euronews, the Mainichi, NBC News and CBS News to discuss the case's developments and its implications.

== Awards and recognition ==
Karam was awarded the medal of the Lebanese National Order of Merit of the rank of Knight in 2022. He received the Palestinian Medal of Culture, Science and Arts with high distinction in 2021, the French National Order of Merit of the Rank of Knight in 2016, and was awarded the Beirut International Festival Prize in 2012, the Lebanese American University Alumni Achievement Award in 2011, and in that same year, the prize of the Sheikh Ibrahim Bin Mohamad Al Khalifa Center for Culture and Research.

== Takreem ==
In 2009, Karam created Takreem, which he designed as a platform aiming to promote good ethics in Arabs by honoring those who excel in their fields and who can act as role models for role models.

== Peacomms ==
In 2021, Karam founded Peacomms, a coaching and public speaking training platform.

== Shining Stars of Hope ==
In 2023, Karam launched the ″Shining Stars of Hope″, a fundraising Christmas event to support struggling Lebanese artists.

== Podcast series ==
In his original podcast featured interviews with change-makers. His first guest was HRH Prince Ali bin Hussein of Jordan, son of King Hussein bin Talal and his third wife Queen Alia, half-brother of King Abdullah and president of the West Asian Football Federation, Other prestigious guests followed such as literary Mr. Amine Maalouf, Palestinian political Hanan Ashrawi, media figure Baria Alamuddin and Lebanese-American poet, essayist, and visual artist Etel Adnan.

Karam also conducted an interview with journalist Giselle Khoury her final interview, just a couple of weeks before her passing. During the Gaza war, Karam engaged in discussions with Leila Khaled, the Palestinian militant, and Ghassan Abu-Sittah.

== Television series ==
- Tariq Al Amal (Road of Hope) - Abu Dhabi TV 2019 - 2020
- Al Khatef Moukabel Al Fidya (Kidnapping for A Ransom) - Al Aan TV 2017
- Woojooh Al Madina (Faces of the City) - BBC Arabic/Abu Dhabi TV 2016–2020
- Maa Ricardo Karam (With Ricardo Karam) - CNBC Arabiya, Future TV and LBC 2013–2020
- Iraqioon (Iraqis) - Al Sumaria 2011 - 2012
- Hadisson Akhar (A Different Talk) - LBCI and LBC 2009–2011
- Qissat Liqa’a (Story of an Encounter) - Al Sumaria 2008–2009
- Wara'a Al Woojooh (Beyond Faces) - Future TV 2003–2008
- Maraya (Mirrors) - MTV Lebanon 1996–2000
- Souar (Pictures) - MTV Lebanon 1995–1996
- Focus - Télé Liban 1992–1995
