= Adah Almutairi =

American academic

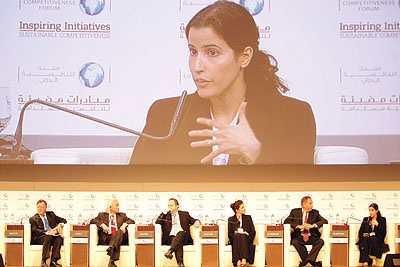
- Adah Almutairi in 2013
- Born: November 1, 1976 (age 50); Portland, Oregon, United States
- Occupation: Former Associate Professor UCSD
- Known for: Pharmaceutical sciences and nanomedicine
- Awards: NIH Director's New Innovator Award (2009)

Adah Almutairi (Arabic: غادة المطيري; born November 1, 1976) is a scientist and was an associate professor at the University of California, San Diego (UCSD). Her work focuses on nanomedicine, nanotechnology, chemistry and polymer science.

== Early life and education ==
Almutairi was born on November 1, 1976, in Portland, Oregon, United States to Saudi parents.

== Academic career ==
She obtained her Ph.D. in materials chemistry from University of California, Riverside, with a focus on electron delocalization and molecular structure in 2005. She completed her postdoctoral studies in chemistry and chemical engineering at the University of California, Berkeley, from 2005 to 2008. At Berkeley, Almutairi worked with Jean Fréchet where she developed several nanoprobes for in vivo molecular imaging. She joined the University of California, San Diego in 2008 and left in 2022. Almutairi is currently a Board of Trustees Member with the Future Investment Initiative.

== Research ==
Almutairi's research has focused on smart materials and nanomedicine, including systems for drug delivery, tissue regeneration and image-based diagnosis. Her 2009 NIH Director's New Innovator Award project was titled "Chemically Amplified Response Strategies for Medical Sciences; Concepts Borrowed from the Electronics Industry."

== Awards and honors ==
Almutairi received the NIH Director's New Innovator Award in 2009. She is a 2016 Kavli Fellow and 2023 TAKREEM Laureate.
