= Al-Mi'mar Mosque =

Mosque in Jeddah, Saudi Arabia

Al-Mi'mār Mosque
- مسجد المعمار
- The mosque in the Old City (Al-Balad)

Religion
- Affiliation: Islam
- Ecclesiastical or organisational status: Mosque
- Status: Active

Location
- Location: Jeddah, Mecca Province
- Country: Saudi Arabia
- Interactive map of Al-Mi'mār Mosque
- Coordinates: 21°29′03.59″N 39°11′12.15″E

Architecture
- Type: Mosque
- Completed: 19th century
- Minaret: 1

Al-Mi'mar Mosque (Arabic: مسجد المعمار, romanized: Masjid al-Miʿmār) is a 19th-century mosque in Jeddah, Saudi Arabia. it is one of the Old Town's (Al-Balad district) historical landmarks.

== Gallery ==
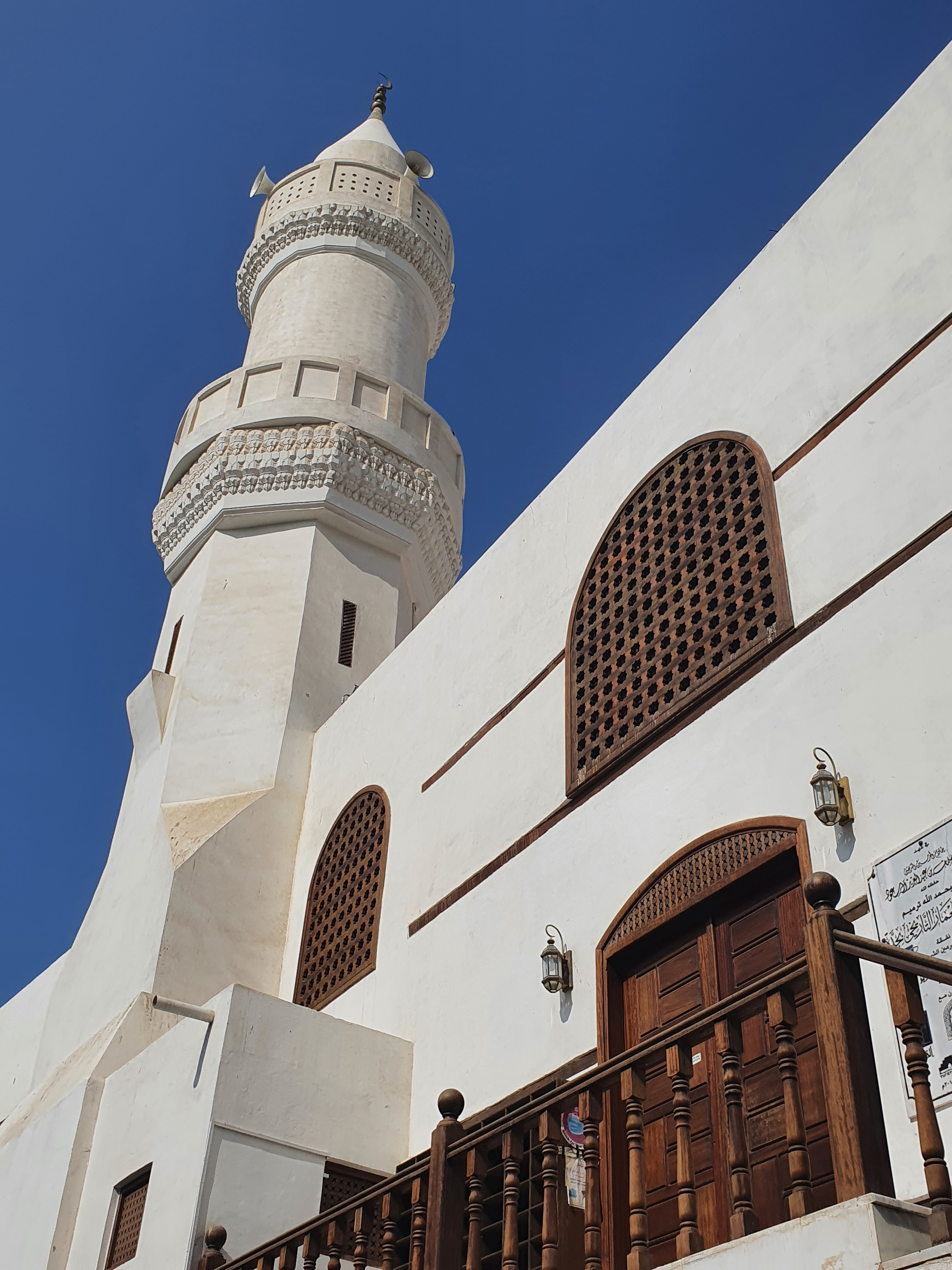

== See also ==
- List of mosques in Saudi Arabia
- Islam in Saudi Arabia
