= Souq Qabil =

Market in Jeddah, Saudi Arabia

Qabil Street
- شارع قابل
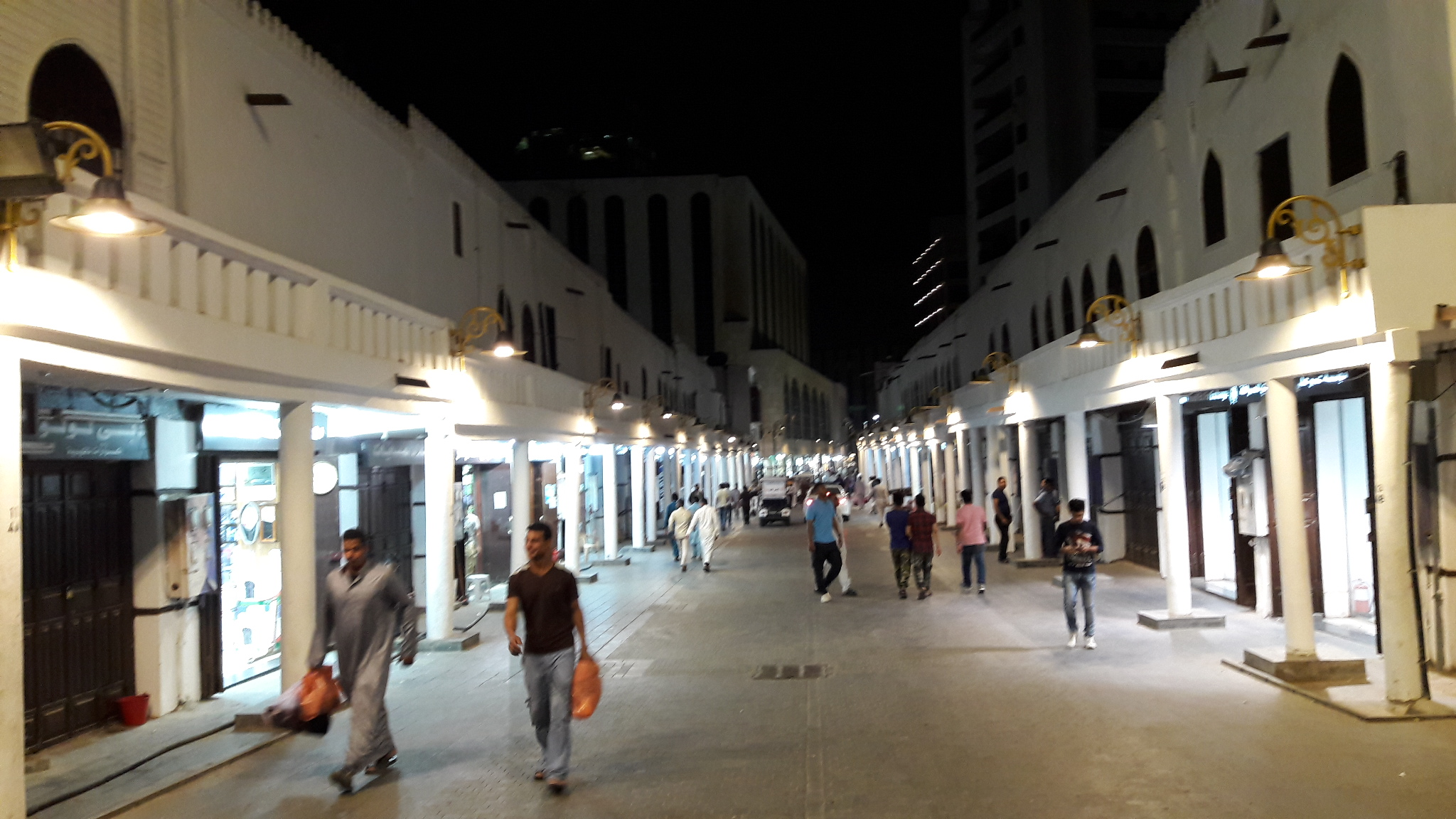
- Interactive map of Qabil Street
- Length: 77 m (253 ft)
- Width: 7 meters
- Area: Al Balad
- Location: Al Balad, Jeddah, Saudi Arabia
- Coordinates: 21.484075°N 39.185195°E

Other
- Known for: History
- Status: Active

Qabil Street (Arabic: شارع قابل) also known as Souq Qabil (Arabic: سوق قابل) is a market street in Jeddah, Saudi Arabia. It is one of Jeddah's oldest markets, located in the heart of the city's historic centre, Al Balad.

The market is on a narrow street with historic buildings and old-style restaurants and shops that sell goods, ranging from spices and household needs to perfumes and jewellery. It is marked as "Qabel Trail" on Google Maps.

== History ==
Qabil Street was founded by Hussein bin Ali in the early years of the 20th century. It was not given its name until it was bought in 1925–6 by Suliman Qabil, who was one of the most popular merchants in the city at the time.

Qabil Street was home to currency exchange shops. It also specialized in imported textiles, shoes, watches, etc., as well as locally manufactured goods. The street was the first to be electrified in the city.

== Route ==
The street leads from King Abdulaziz Road, close to Al Mahmal Center in Al Balad to Al Dhahab Street. It is 77 meters long and seven meters wide.

Heading east towards Al Ma’amar Mosque, there are historic buildings like Nassif House Museum and Matbouli House Museum, among the best-preserved examples of old Jeddah architecture.

== Qabil Street during Ramadan ==
The Historic Jeddah festival is annually held in Al Balad to celebrate the culture and heritage of Jeddah usually during the month of Ramadan and Eid. Qabil Street becomes particularly active with entertainment and activities being held, including seasonal food stalls, street hawkers, music, and plays by artists dressed in traditional Saudi outfits representing the local folklore.

== See also ==
- King Saud Mosque
- List of shopping malls in Saudi Arabia
- Tourism in Saudi Arabia
