= Al-Balad, Jeddah =

Historical place in Jeddah, Saudi Arabia

Al-Balad
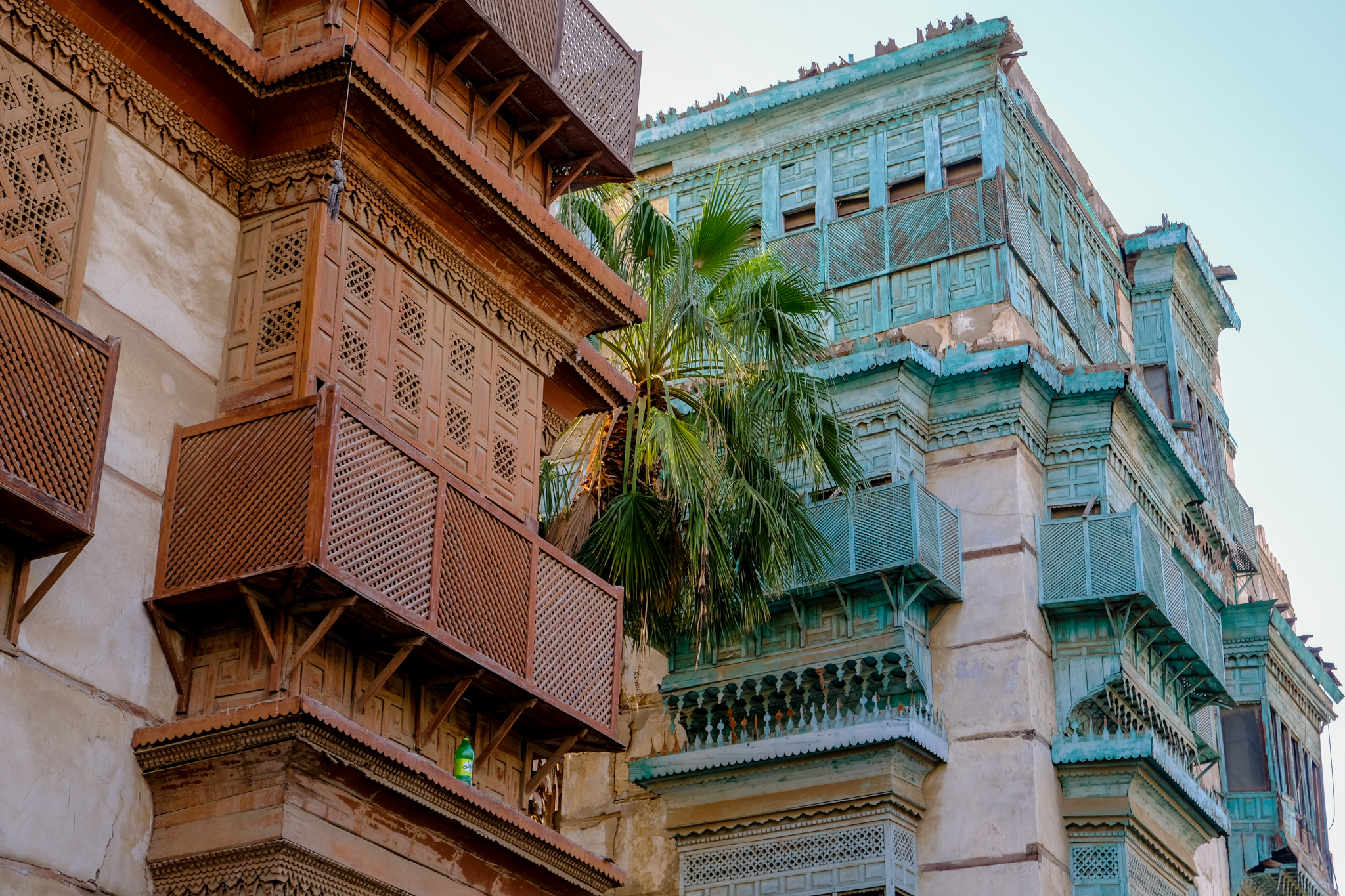
- Historic Jeddah, the Gate to Mecca, a UNESCO World Heritage Site

- Wordmark

- Location within Saudi Arabia
- Coordinates: 21°29′N 39°11′E
- Country: Saudi Arabia
- Province: Mecca Province
- City: Jeddah
- Website: Official Website

UNESCO World Heritage Site
- Official name: Historic Jeddah, the Gate to Mecca
- Type: Cultural
- Criteria: ii, iv, vi
- Designated: 2014 (38th session)
- Reference no.: 1361
- Region: the Arab States

Al-Balad (Arabic: البلد, romanized: al-Balad, lit. 'the town'), also known as Jeddah Historic District (Arabic: جدة التاريخية), is the historical area of Jeddah, the second largest city of Saudi Arabia. Al-Balad can literally be translated to "The Town". Al-Balad is the historic center of the City of Jeddah.

Traditional Hijazi houses are characterized by their wooden Roshan windows (Arabic: روشان), and wooden mushrabiyas.

In May 2019, Crown Prince Mohammed bin Salman announced a multi-billion dollar restoration of 56 historical building in Al-Balad. The first stage of the restoration is worth $13.3 million.

In October 2023 and in line with Saudi Vision 2030, The Saudi Public Investment Fund announced Al Balad Development Company, which aims to transform Historic Jeddah into a global tourist destination.

== History ==
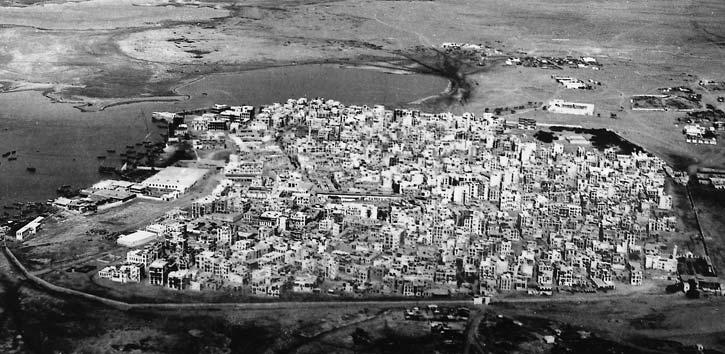
Jeddah in 1938

Al-Balad was founded in the 7th century and historically served as the centre of Jeddah. Al-Balad's defensive walls were torn down in the 1940s. In the 1970s and 1980s, when Jeddah began to become wealthier due to the oil boom, many Jeddawis moved north, away from Al-Balad, as it reminded them of less prosperous times. Al-Balad had insufficient parking space for large cars. Its stores did not sell expensive designer clothing. Poor immigrants moved in place of the Saudi population. The municipality of Jeddah began historical preservation efforts in the 1970s. In 1991 the Municipality of Jeddah founded the Jeddah Historical Preservation Society to preserve the historical architecture and culture of Al-Balad. In 2002, US$4 million were earmarked for the preservation society. In 2009, Al-Balad was nominated by Saudi Commission for Tourism and Antiquities to be added to UNESCO's World Heritage list, and it was accepted in 2014.

Many Jeddawis had moved away from Al-Balad by 2007; the streets of Balad were still packed with people during the month of Ramadan. Around that year the Jeddah Urban Development Company was formed to restore Al-Balad.

== Historical neighborhoods ==
Al-Balad is mainly divided into a number of different districts:

- Al-Mazloum neighborhood: This neighborhood was named after Abdulkarim al-Barzanji, who was killed by the Ottoman government, and is located in the north-eastern part of the area, north of Al-Alawi Street. It includes Dar Al-Qabil, Al-Shafi'i Mosque, and Souk Al-Jamaa, known as Souq Qabil.
- Al-Sham neighborhood: Located in the northern part of Al-Balad, which includes Dar al-Sarti and Dar al-Zahid.
- Al-Yemen neighborhood: Located in the southern part of Al-Balad, south of Al-Alawi Street, and gained its name from its direction towards the country of Yemen, it includes Dar Al-Nassif, Dar Al-Jumjum, Dar Al-Shaarawi, and Dar Al-Abdul-Samad.
- Al-Bahr neighborhood: Located in the south-western part of Jeddah, overlooking the sea and Dar Al-Radwan, known at the time as the Radwan of Sea.

== Historical houses ==
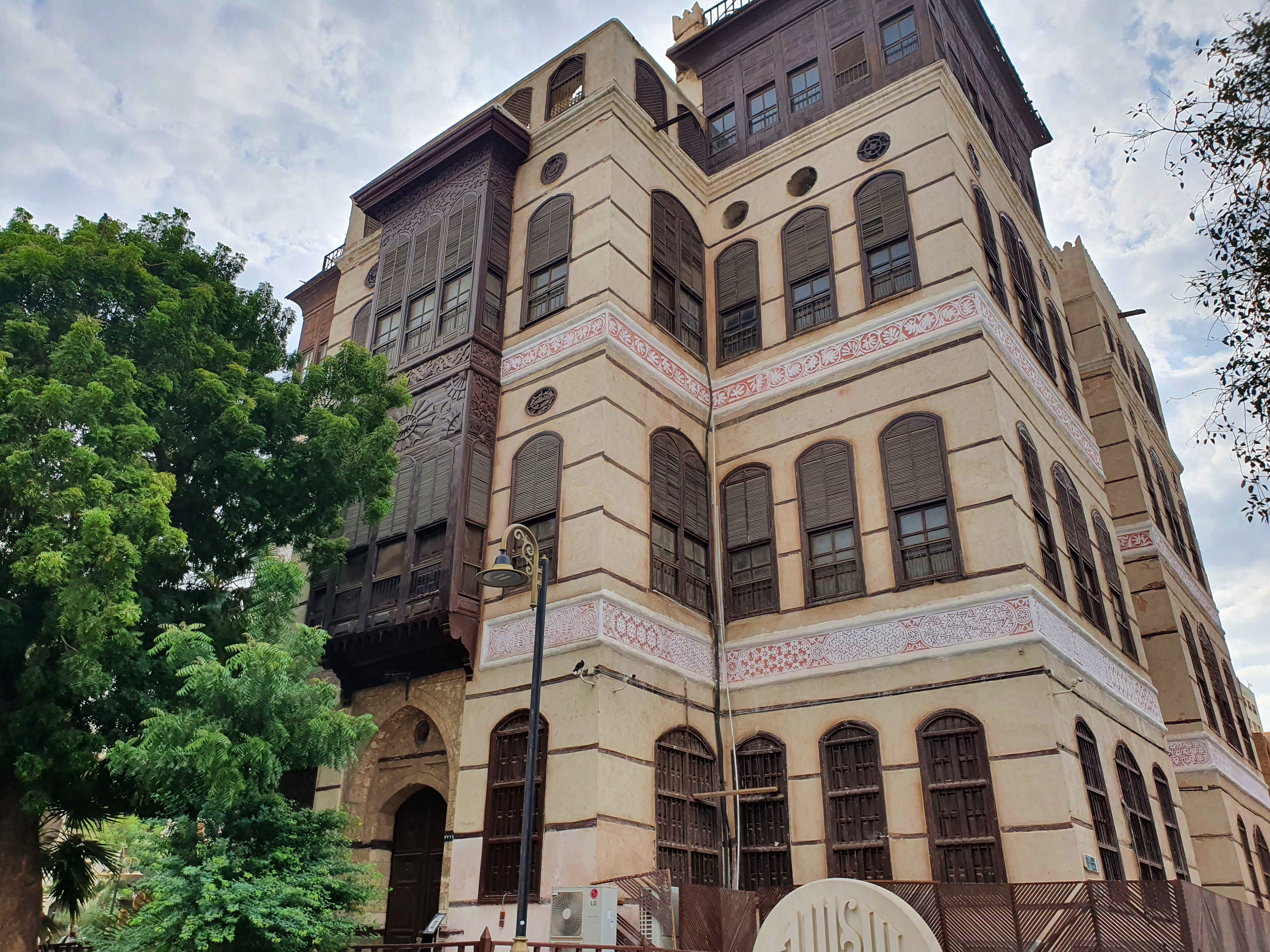
Naseef House, 2020

Among the most famous and oldest buildings to date are the Al Nassif House and Al Jamjoom House in Yemen neighborhood, Al Baeshen House, Al Qabal Mosque, Al Shafi'i Mosque in Al Mazloum, Dar Al Banaja and Al Zahed Houses in the Al Sham neighborhood. Some of these buildings have risen to more than 30 meters. Their construction is still in good condition after decades.

Jeddah Old City is a home for 500-year-old buildings that are now subject to restoration as the Saudi crown prince Muhammad bin Salman pledged an amount of $13.3 million to restore 56 buildings. The restoration project will be implemented by the Ministry of Culture. The aim of the project is to boost the artistic culture in Saudi Arabia.

In May 2024, Jeddah Historic District Program announced the restoration of 3 historical houses, which are the Jokhdar House, Al-Rayyis House, and Kedwan House, and turning them into luxury hotels. The restoration was supervised by the ministry of culture, which assigned Al Balad Development Company to manage the hotels.

== Non-Muslim Cemetery ==
The Non-Muslim Cemetery (formerly known as the Christian Cemetery) is located on the King Fahd Branch Road in Al-Balad. The cemetery is hidden from sight by a wall and high trees. The supervision of the site is the responsibility of Western consulates in Jeddah.

The cemetery contains more than 400 graves, including a sarcophagus dedicated to the French explorer Charles Huber and a single Commonwealth War Graves Commission gravestone for a British soldier of the Second World War. Cyril Ousman, the British Vice-consul of Jeddah who was shot and killed by Prince Mishari bin Abdulaziz Al Saud is also buried here. Recent burials have been rare and infrequent, and are mostly of Indian and Filipino children.

The cemetery has existed since the 16th century when it was used to bury Portuguese casualties resulting from the Ottoman–Portuguese wars. The walls of the cemetery may have been built by Muhammad Ali of Egypt in the aftermath of the Ottoman–Saudi wars of the 1810s. The cemetery was vandalised following the Battle of Jeddah in 1925.

== Gallery ==
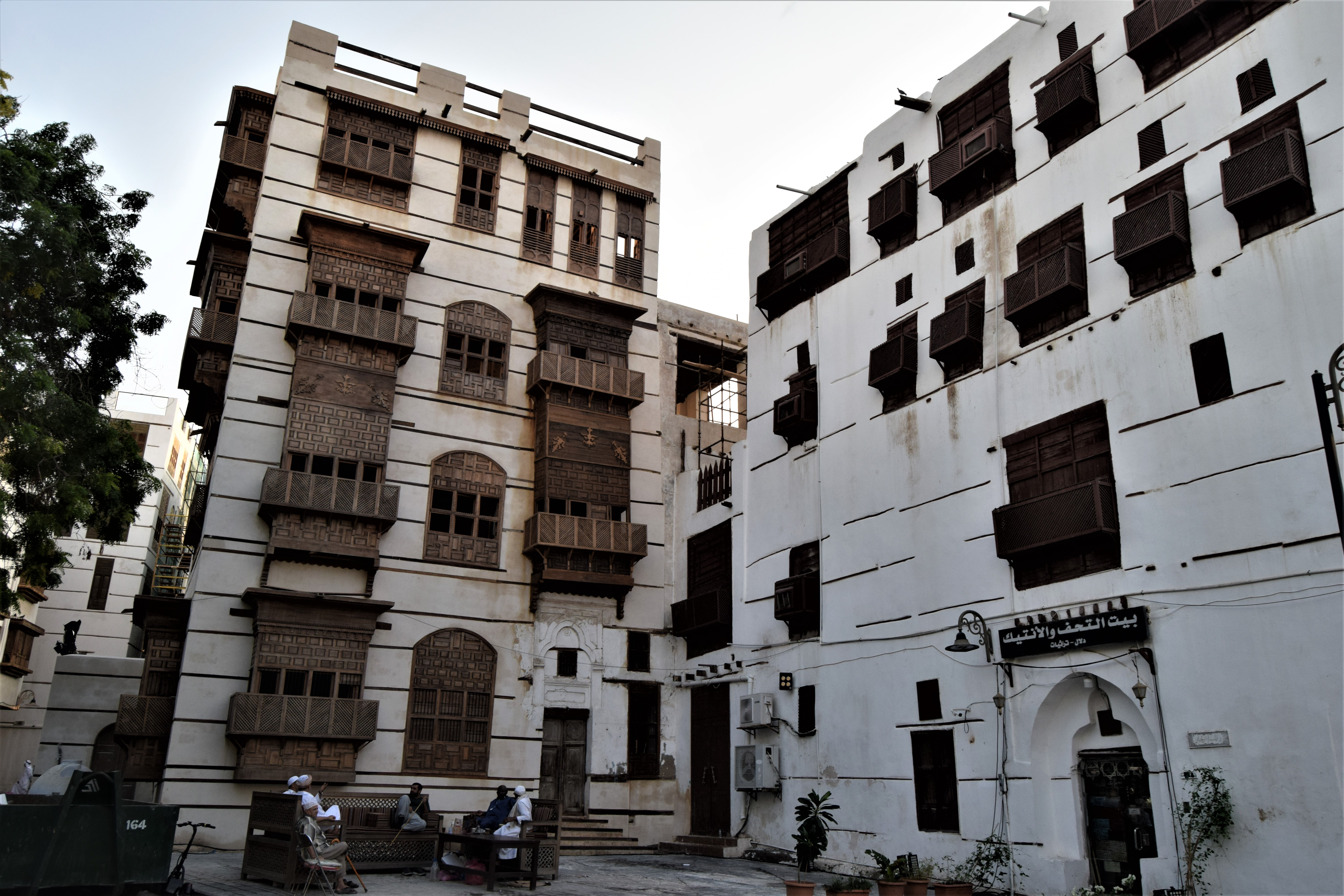
Antiques house in Al-Balad

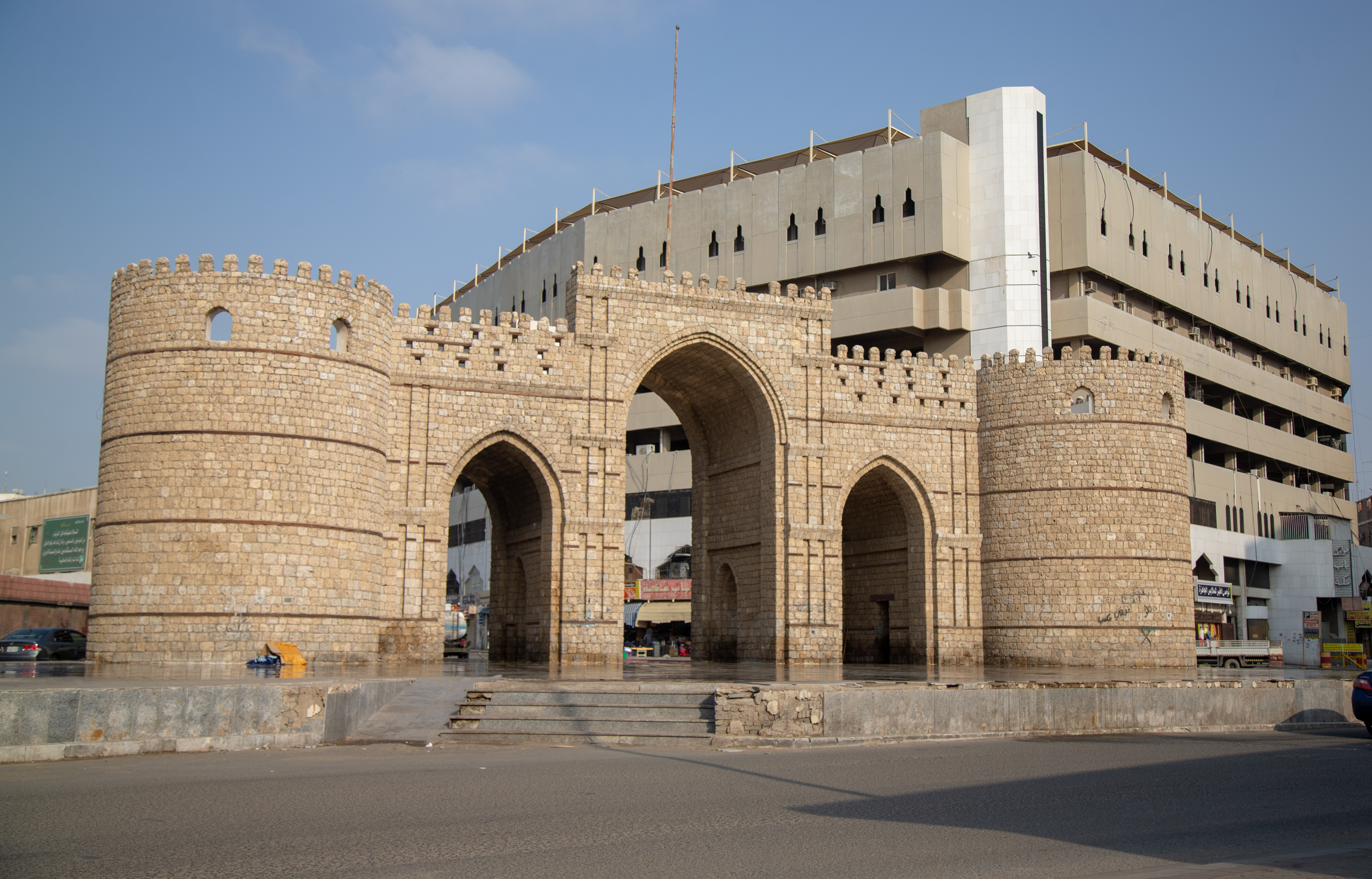
Makkah Gate

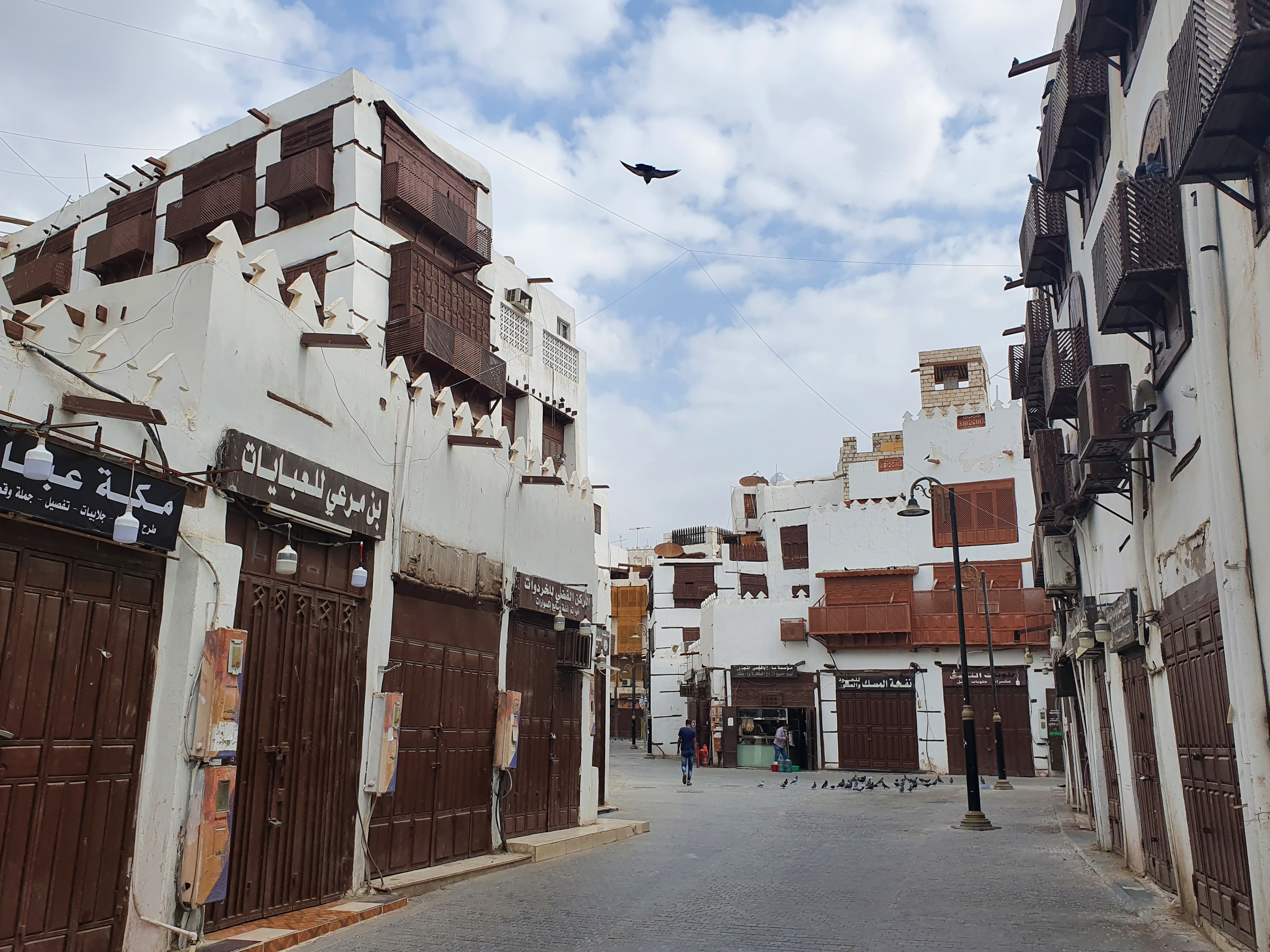
Market street, 2020

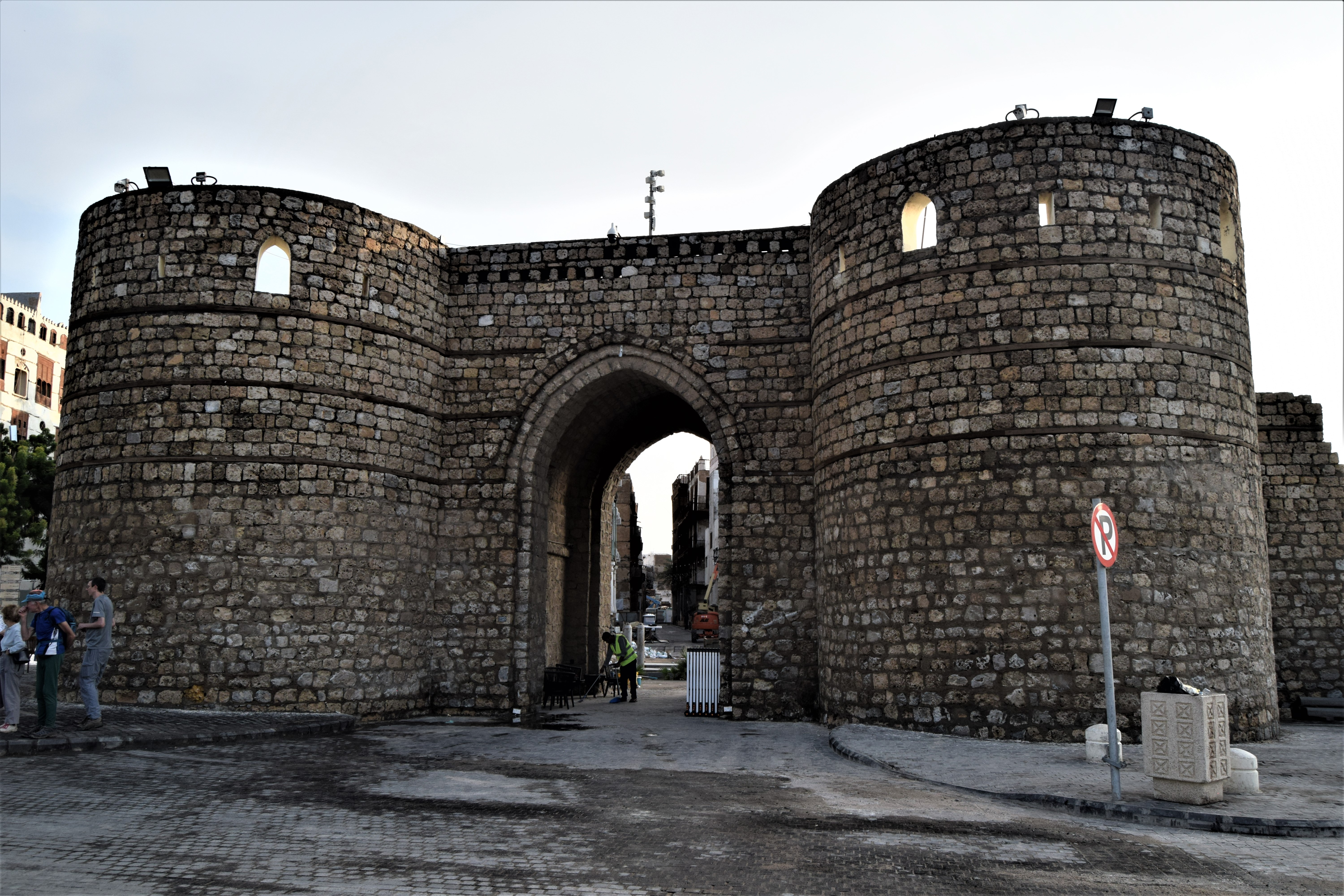
Al-Madinah Gate, 2022

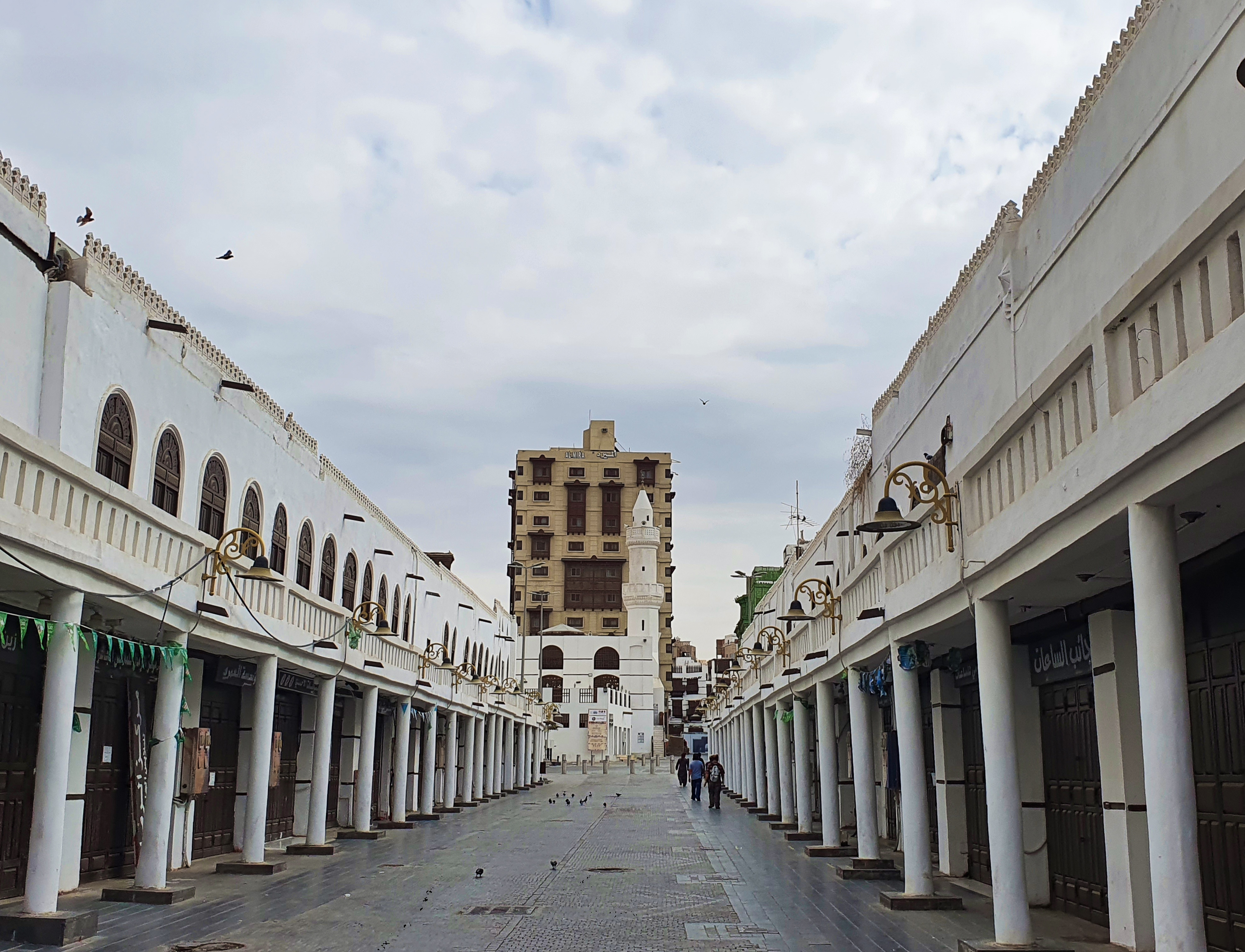
Market street with mosque and tower house, 2020

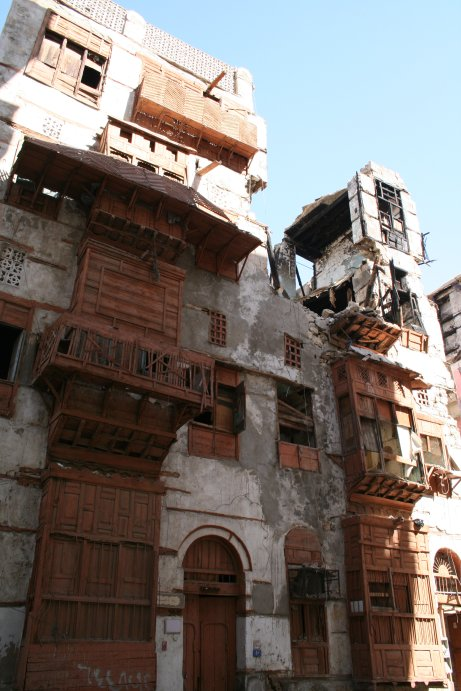
Ruins in Al-Balad

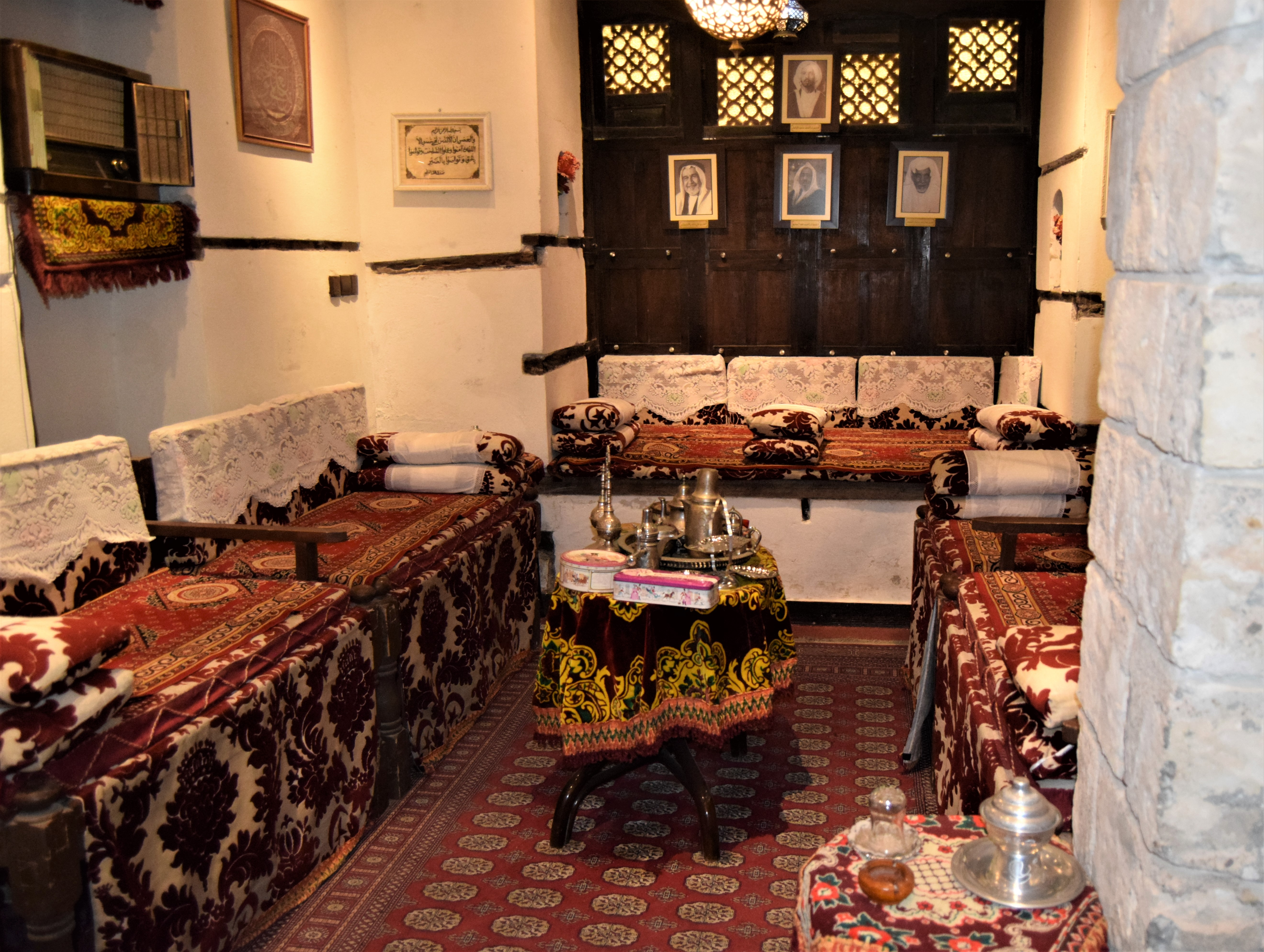
Traditional house interior in Al-Balad

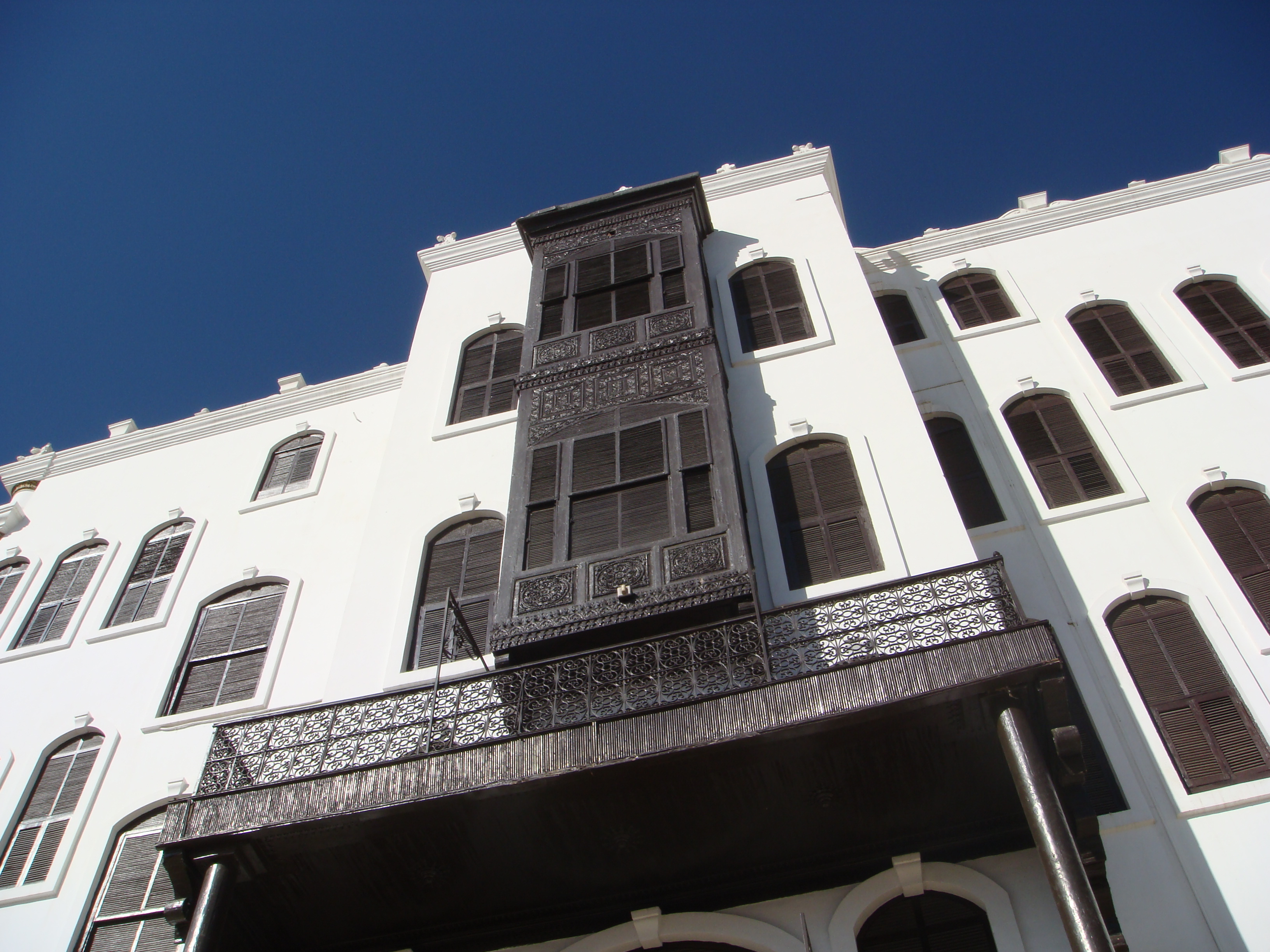
Royal building in Al-Balad

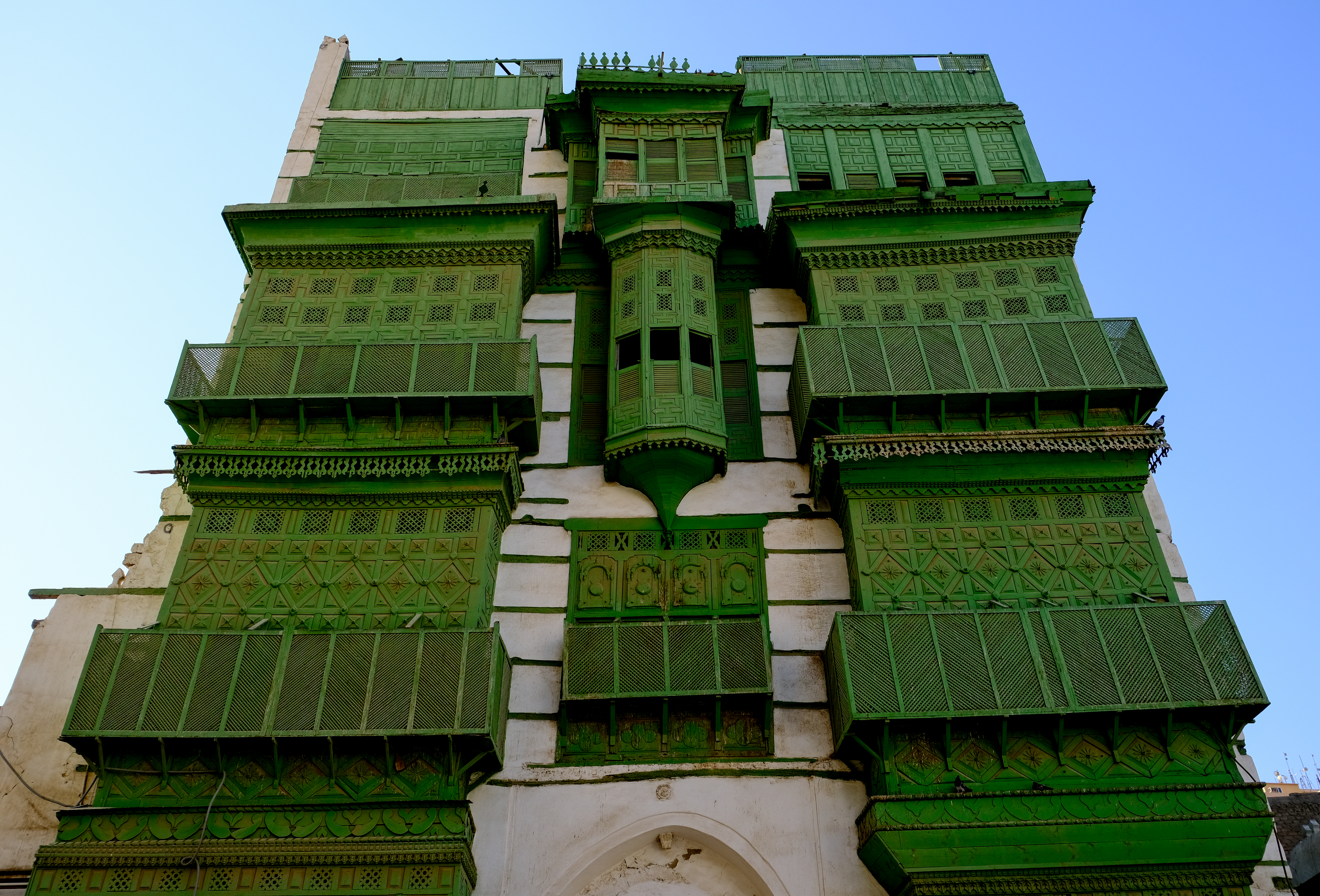
Beit Noor Wali in Al-Yemen Neighborhood

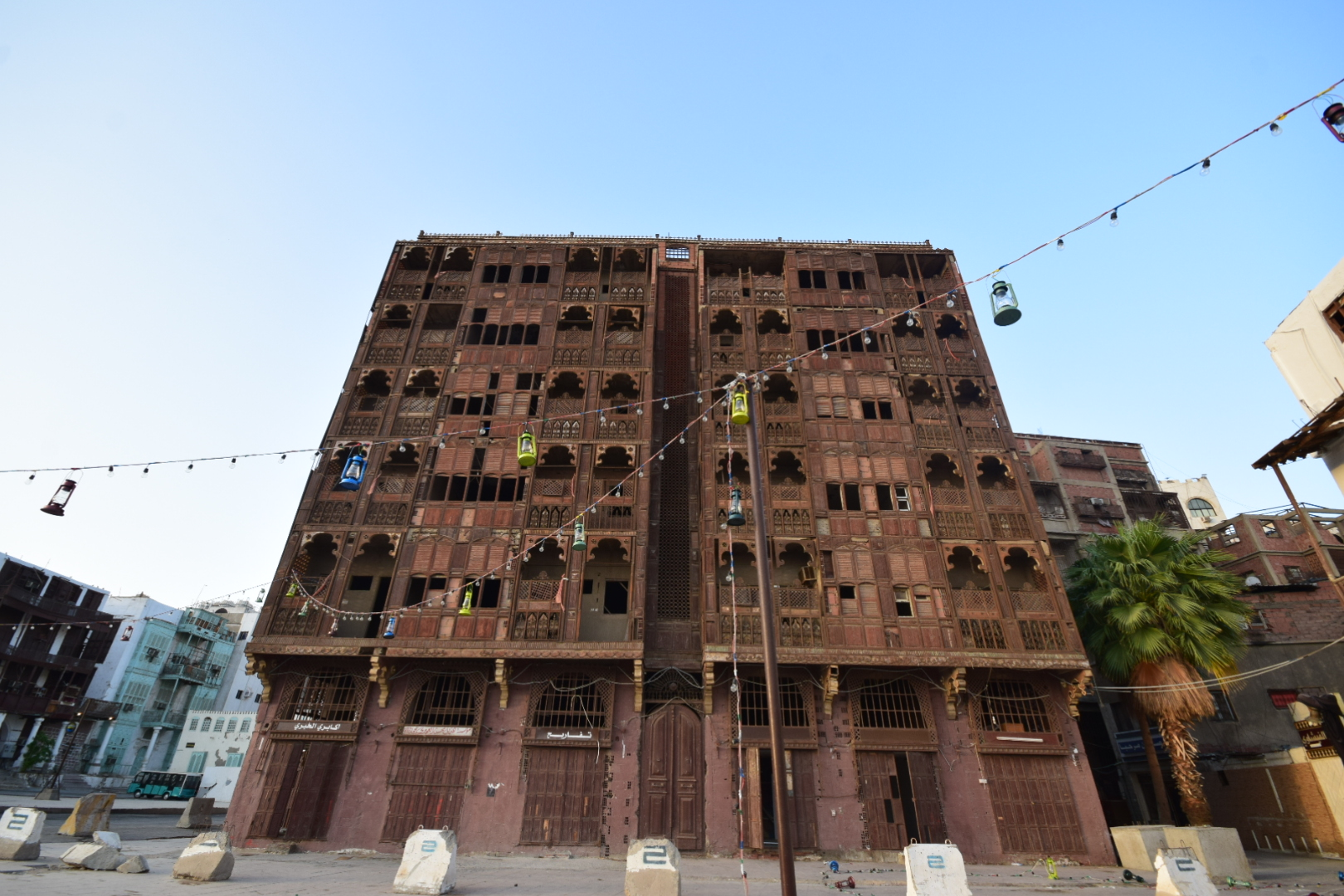
Bait Bajanaid

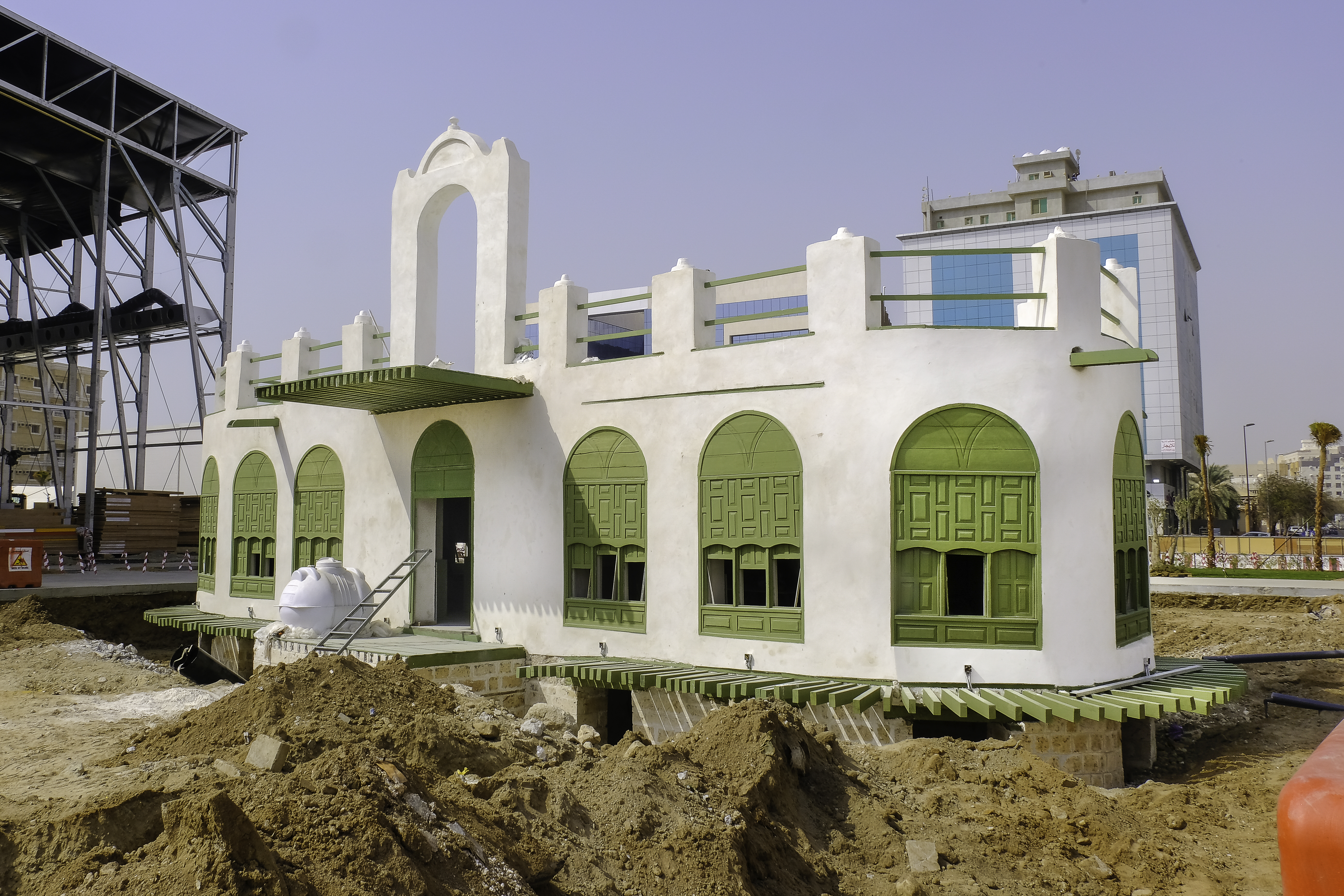
Beit Amir Al Bahr (House of the Prince of the Sea) during reconstruction, 2020

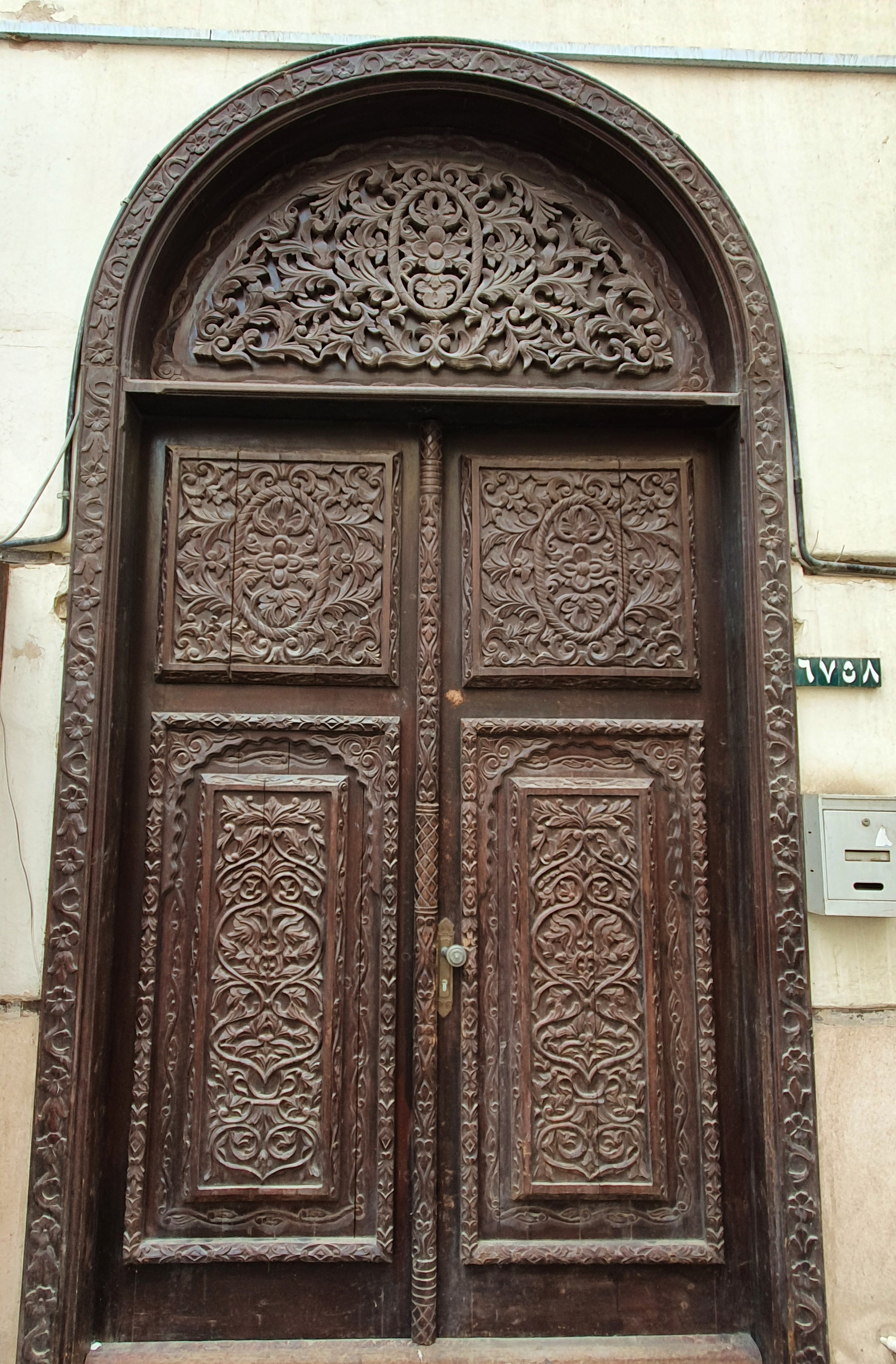
Elaborately carved wooden door

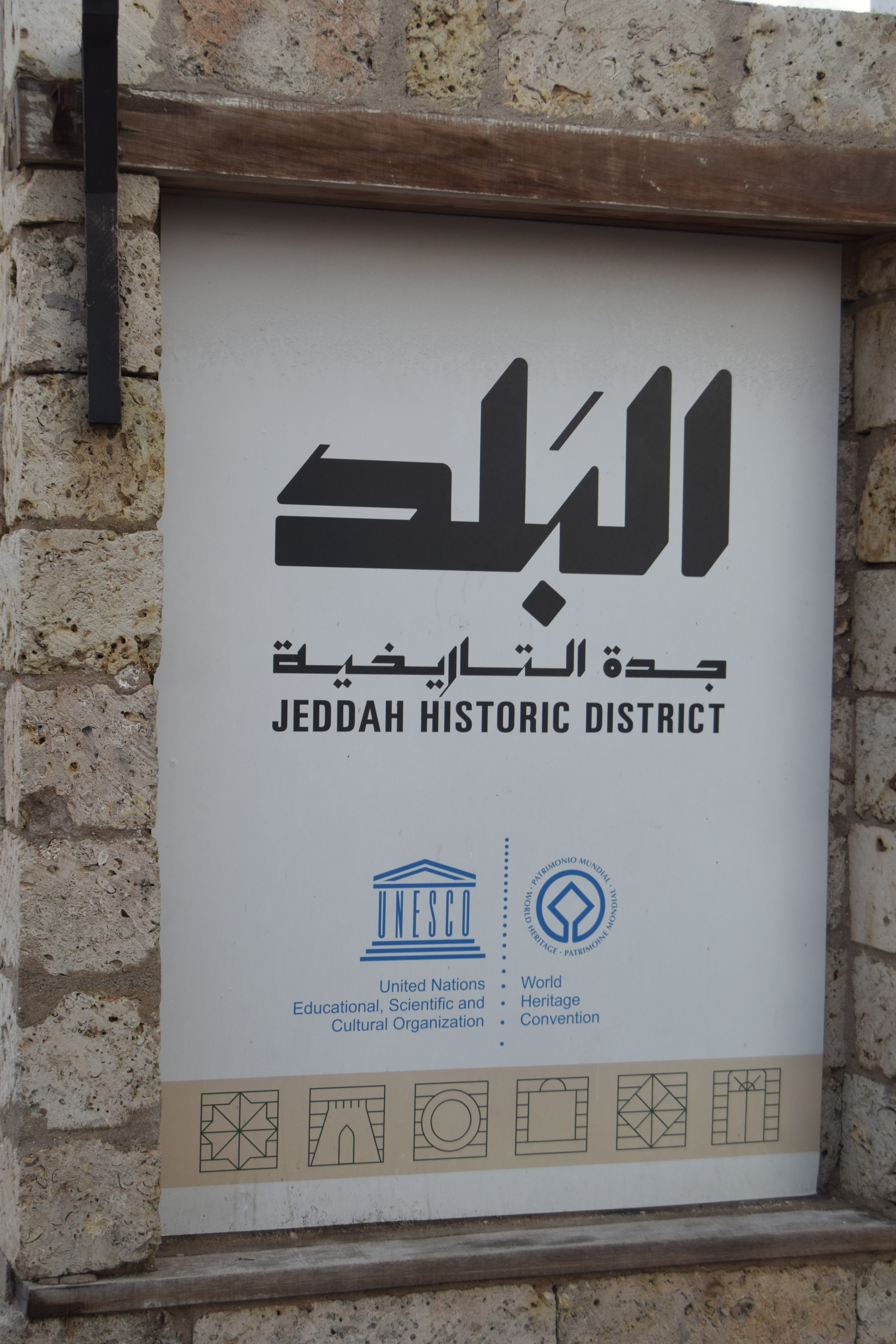
Sign containing Old Jeddah seal, in addition to UNESCO logo

== Misk Historic Jeddah Initiative ==
It is an annual event that takes place at Jeddah's historical area. The main aim of the event is to highlight the historical and cultural significance of AL-Balad. During the event, visitors walk through the old streets and alleys. Moreover, the initiative organizes a number of traditional entertainment activities for kids and adults. Being part of the Jeddah Season touristic festival 2019, Al-Balad hosted a number of events, all of which are organized under the title "Kanz Al-Balad". Kanz Al-Balad is a scavenger hunt in which participants are asked to find particular places or objects. Along the game, participants can enjoy attending more than 41 shows and plays in the area.

== See also ==
- List of World Heritage Sites in Saudi Arabia
- Jeddah Central
