= Takreem =

Takreem Foundation
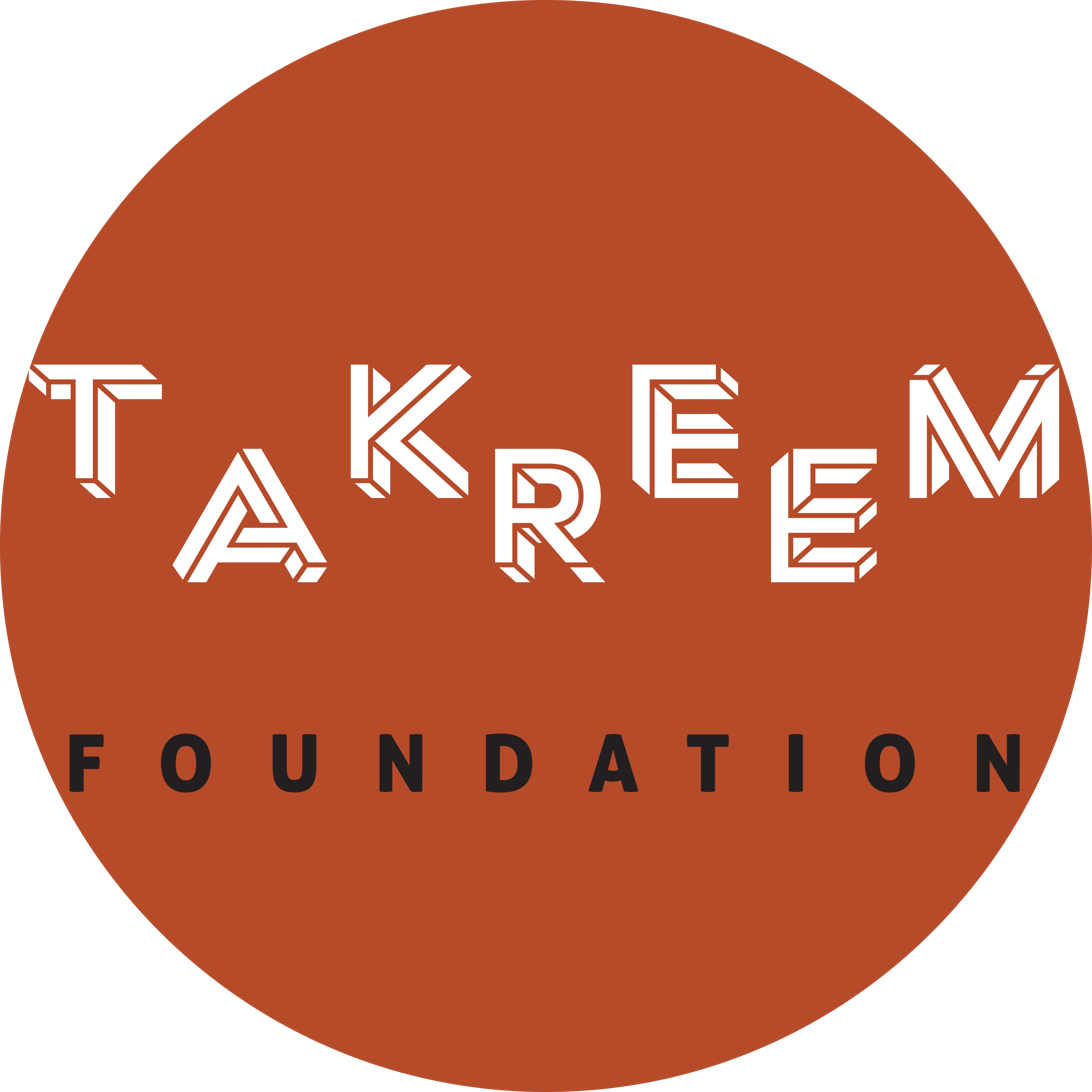
- Country: Every year the award ceremony is held in a different city around the world
- Reward: Memorial award
- First award: 2010; 16 years ago
- Final award: 2025
- Number of laureates: 170 laureates (as of 2025)
- Website: takreem.org

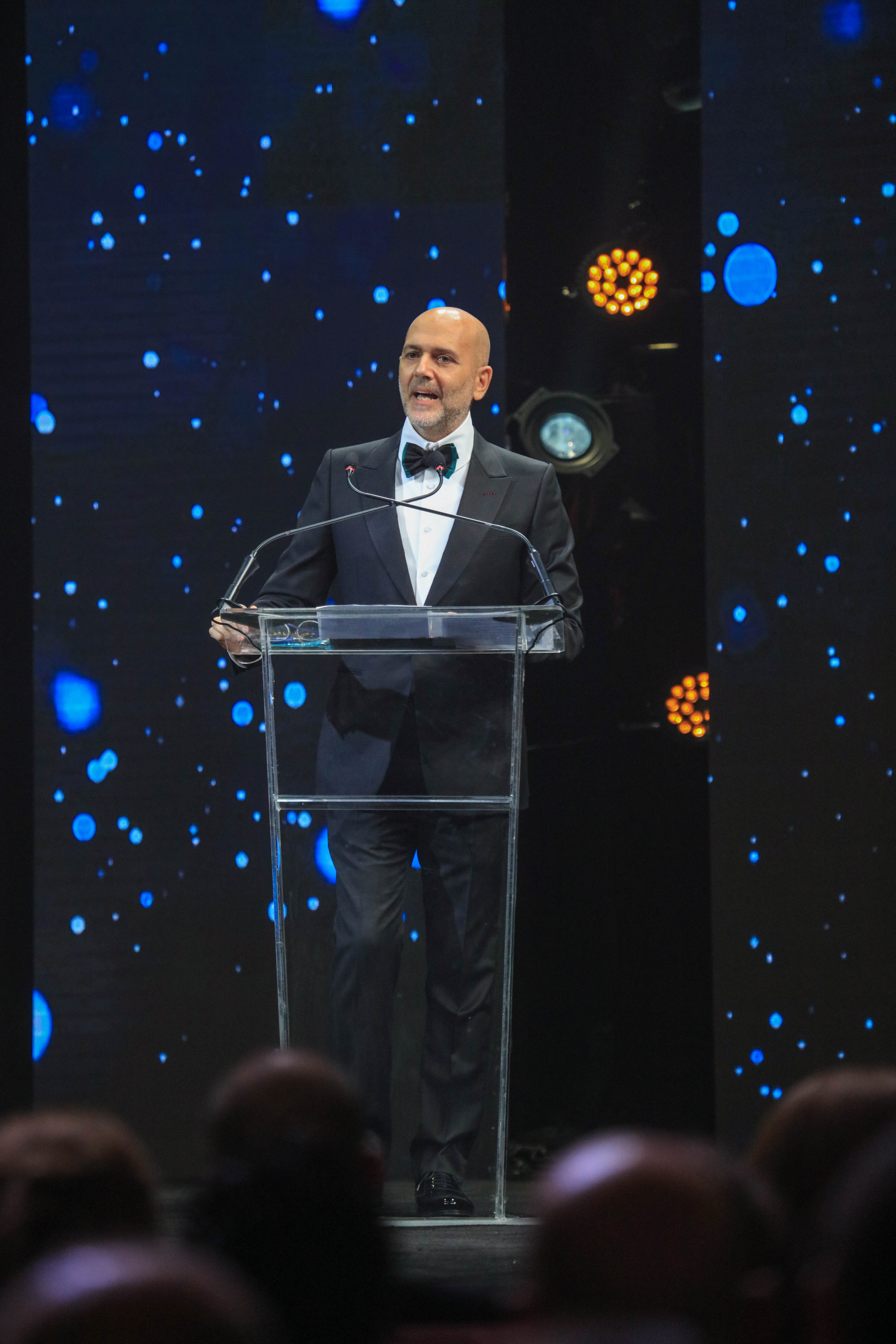
Ricardo Karam giving his keynote in Amman, 2017.

Takreem (Arabic: تكريم) is a non-profit organization founded in 2009 by Ricardo Karam to recognize Arab individuals or organizations for their contributions to their communities and achievements in culture, education, science, environmental studies, humanitarian services, and socio-economic development.

== History ==
Takreem officially launched at a press conference held at École supérieure des affaires (ESA), Beirut at 2009.

Takreem organizes conferences, symposiums, and meetings. It offers mentorships and holds an annual Awards Ceremony celebrated in a different city every year. By showcasing achievements from the Arab world, the foundation seeks to address stereotypes about the region and promotes creativity, freedom of thought, human rights, entrepreneurship, advanced technology, and gender equality.

In 2023, Takreem organized the "Shining Stars of Hope" Christmas Special, a fundraising event. On May 15, 2025, the inaugural meeting of the TAKREEM Board of Trustees was held in Dubai.

Takreem recognizes achievements by Arabs in science, culture, environment, education, humanitarian work, and the economy. Its 8th award ceremony was held in 2017, in Amman, Jordan. The event was attended by Queen Noor and members of the Jordanian royal family.

In 2018, Takreem launched TAKminds, an interdisciplinary think-tank bringing together thought-leaders, change-makers, and professionals.

In 2019, Takreem decided to expand its activities to reach the Arab diasporas in both Americas. Takreem America was launched in 2022.

== Activities ==
Takreem organizes activities such as conferences, panel discussions, talks, and forums, in addition to its annual awards ceremony. These activities host speakers from different parts of the world who share their insights on important issues, drawing on their life experiences and careers.

== Jury and Honorary Boards ==
In, 2017 Takreem’s former and present jury board include of Dr. Nouha Alhegelan, HE Dr. Lakhdar Brahimi, Mr. Samir Brikho, Mr. Carlos Ghosn, Mr. Marc Levy, Dr. Akef Maghraby, Lady Hayat Palumbo, HE Sheikha Paula Al Sabah, Dr. Ahmed Heikal, Mr. Issa Abu-Issa, Mrs. Nora Joumblatt, HE Sheikha Hala Al Khalifa, Mr. Riad Al-Sadik, Mr. Raja Sidawi, HRH Princess Alia Tabbaa and Sheikh Saleh Al-Turki.

Its honorary board was presided over by HM Queen Noor Al-Hussein [18] and includes HE Dr. Hanan Ashrawi, HE Dr. Farouk Hosny, Dr. Suad Juffali, HE Sheikha Mai Al Khalifa, HRH Princess Banderi AlFaisal, Mr. Samer Khoury, Mrs. Latifa Kosta, HE Dr. Amre Moussa and HE Dr. Leila Sharaf.

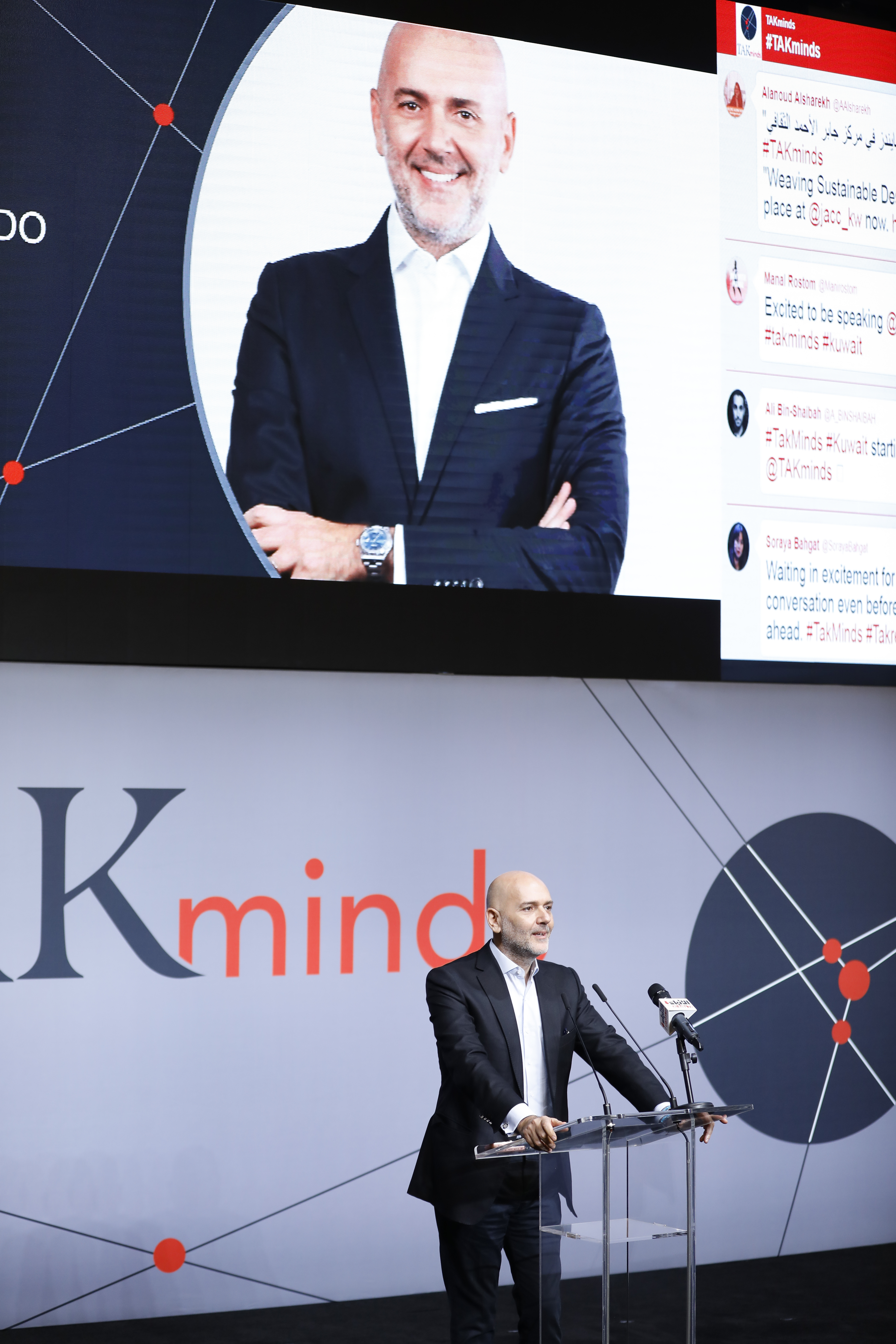
Ricardo Karam during the launch of the TakMinds platform in Kuwait, 2018

=== Conferences ===
- Successful women share their best career advice - Amman 2017
- Arab Women Today - Dubai 2015

=== Panel discussions ===
- Refugees and the Regional and Global Response to Forced Migration - Geneva 2022
- They are Shaping the World's Agenda - London 2019

=== TAKminds ===
- The Politics of Trauma and Collective Healing - Beirut 2023

== Takreem America ==
In 2019, Takreem established a branch in the United States
