= Maha bint Mishari Al Saud =

Saudi Arabian academic and royal

- Born: Beirut, Lebanon
- Citizenship: Saudi Arabian
- Occupation: Physician
- Title: Associate Professor
- Spouse: Prince Khaled bin Saad Al Saud
- Children: 5 daughters
- Parent: Mishari bin Abdulaziz Al Saud (father)
- Relatives: King Abdulaziz (grandfather)

Academic background
- Education: King Saud University; George Washington University Hospital for Internal Medicine; American Board of Internal Medicine

Academic work
- Discipline: Medicine
- Sub-discipline: Internal medicine
- Institutions: Alfaisal University; King Faisal Specialist Hospital and Research Centre

Maha bint Mishari Al Saud (Arabic: مها بنت مشاري بن عبدالعزيز آل سعود) is an academic at Alfaisal University's College of Medicine and a physician at King Faisal Specialist Hospital and Research Centre. She is a member of the Saudi royal family, one of the grandchildren of Saudi's founder King Abdulaziz.

As of June 2026, she is CEO of the Future Investment Initiative Institute (FII Institute).

== Early life and education ==
Princess Maha is the daughter of Mishari bint Abdulaziz, one of the children of King Abdulaziz. Her mother is a Syrian woman from Aleppo, whose father was a physician. Princess Maha was born in Beirut.

Princess Maha got her early education in Lebanon and in Riyadh. She holds a bachelor’s degree in medicine and surgery which she received from the College of Medicine at King Saud University in 1986. She completed her residency program at George Washington University Hospital in internal medicine in 1993. In 1994, she got a certificate from the American Board of Internal Medicine.

== Career ==
Following her medicine training, Princess Maha began to work at King Faisal Specialist Hospital and Research Center in 1995 where she still works as a consultant in internal medicine and a senior clinical scientist. She is an associate professor of medicine at Alfaisal University’s College of Medicine and has served as the university’s vice president of external relations since 2014.

She served as the governor of Saudi Arabia chapter of the American College of Physicians and a member of College's international council from 2015 to 2019. She was also a member of the board at the Primary Vascular Research Institute.

In June 2026, she was appointed as the Chief Executive Officer (CEO) of the Future Investment Initiative Institute (FII Institute), a global non-profit organization dedicated to fostering innovation and directing investments toward sectors impactful to the future of humanity.

== Personal life ==
Maha bint Mishari is the wife of Prince Khaled bin Saad Al Saud. They have five daughters. They live in Riyadh and also have a mansion in Mulholland Estates in Beverly Hills which they bought in 2013. The mansion was put on sale in February 2020.
