= Future Investment Initiative Institute =

Saudi government-financed foundation

- Future Investment Initiative Institute logo
- Type: Foundation
- CEO: Princess Maha bint Mishari Al Saud
- Founded: 2017; 9 years ago
- Location: Riyadh, Saudi Arabia
- Topics: Sustainability; Healthcare; Education; Artificial intelligence; Robotics
- Website: fii-institute.org

The Future Investment Initiative Institute, or FII Institute, is a non-profit organisation run by the Public Investment Fund, Saudi Arabia's main sovereign wealth fund. The Future Investment Initiative was announced in September 2017 by Saudi Arabia's Public Investment Fund, to "host an annual event bringing people together to invest in the most promising solutions". This has to be seen in the context of the Saudi Vision 2030 program of economic and social reform.

== Conferences ==
The first conference of the Future Investment Initiative took place October 2017 in Riyadh. The meeting brings together policymakers, investors, entrepreneurs, and young leaders to discuss international investment and the global economy. In an address to the conference, Crown Prince Mohammad bin Salman said Saudi Arabia was returning to a more moderate form of Islam "open to all religions and to the world". The event was colloquially referred to by some media and commentators as "Davos in the Desert". The World Economic Forum, which organises its annual meeting in Davos, Switzerland, has objected to the use of "Davos" in such contexts for any event not organised by them.

The Public Investment Fund has used the conferences to make announcements, including its goal to increase its assets under management to $400 billion by 2020, as well investments. The fourth edition of FII took place in a hybrid format on 26–28 January 2021. The foundation is planning in October 2023 the 7th conference.

The 2026 iteration of the conference was postponed to 2027 due to missile and drone attacks by Yemeni Houthi forces.

== Controversy ==
Following the killing in Turkey of Saudi journalist Jamal Khashoggi in October 2018, some speakers and sponsors who had planned to attend the event withdrew, as part of an attempt to distance themselves from the government of Saudi Arabia. These included Los Angeles Times owner Patrick Soon-Shiong, the president of the World Bank Jim Yong Kim, and Viacom CEO Bob Bakish.

Media outlets including The New York Times, the Financial Times, CNBC, Bloomberg, and CNN withdrew as partners. Google also issued a statement stating that Google Cloud Chief Executive Diane Greene would not be attending Future Investment Initiative Summit in Riyadh. Uber Chief Executive Dara Khosrowshahi said amid the concerns over Khashoggi disappearance, Uber would not be a part of the summit. JPMorgan Chase CEO Jamie Dimon, Ford Executive Chairman Bill Ford, BlackRock CEO Larry Fink, The Blackstone Group CEO Stephen Schwarzman, and US Treasury Secretary Steve Mnuchin, among others, also withdrew from the conference.

== Leadership ==
FII Institute's board of trustees includes Yasir Al-Rumayyan, Princess Reema bint Bandar Al Saud, Mohamed Alabbar, Matteo Renzi, Peter Diamandis, Tony F. Chan, Adah Almutairi, and Richard Attias.
