= Alcohol in Saudi Arabia =

Alcohol in Saudi Arabia has been banned since 1953 and can result in harsh sentences, even death. However, an exception was made for foreign diplomats, and there are signs that this ban may be further easing.

== History ==
In the early days of Islam, there was no prohibition of alcohol consumption, but eventually khamr, Arabic for alcohol, was considered haram (forbidden) to Muslims, though some—such as the Hanafi school—believe that khamr does not include all alcoholic drinks.

However, the sale of alcohol in Saudi Arabia was legal until it was banned by King Ibn Saud in 1952. This was a consequence of the 1951 murder of British Vice-Consul Cyril Ousman by intoxicated 19-year-old Prince Mishari, Ibn Saud's son, which infuriated and embarrassed Ibn Saud. The king offered to execute his son, but the widow declined and instead accepted $70,000 blood money; Mishari was imprisoned and sentenced to 20 lashes each month.

Ordinary people caught consuming alcohol in the kingdom were fined and jailed, and foreigners were deported.

After 72 years, in January 2024 a liquor shop opened in the Diplomatic Quarter of Riyadh. However, it only sold to non-Muslim diplomats who would have to present diplomatic identification. The decision was made to combat the black market and illegal imports of the liquid.

Unannounced new rules went into effect at the end of 2025 permitting wealthy non-Muslims, not just diplomats, to purchase liquor.

Saudi Arabia is scheduled to host the 2034 FIFA World Cup. In 2025, Prince Khalid bin Bandar Al Saud stated that alcohol would not be sold during the tournament, including at hotels.

== See also ==
- Saudi Arabian cuisine
