= Non-Muslim Cemetery =

Cemetery in Jeddah, Saudi Arabia

Coordinates: 21.47747°N 39.18299°E

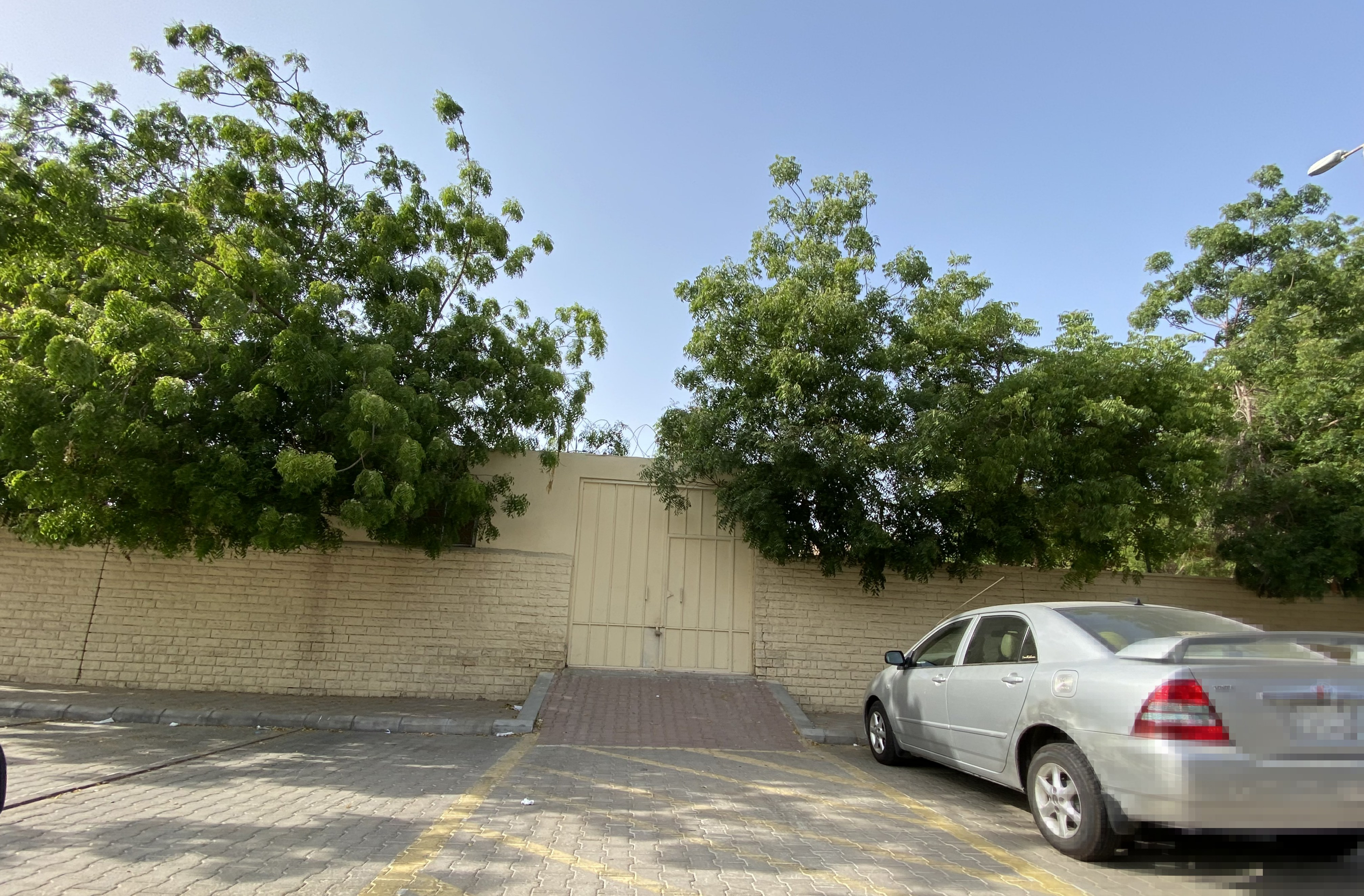
- Outside wall of the Non-Muslim Cemetery
- Interactive map of Non-Muslim Cemetery

Details
- Location: Jeddah, Saudi Arabia
- No. of graves: 400+

The Non-Muslim Cemetery ("NMC" or Christian Cemetery) is a cemetery in Jeddah in the Hejaz region of Saudi Arabia. It is located on the King Fahd Branch Road, in Jeddah's Al-Balad district.

The cemetery contains more than 400 graves. A grey sarcophagus dedicated to the French explorer Charles Huber is located in the cemetery but it is not known if it contains Huber's remains. The French explorer Charles-Xavier Rochet d'Héricourt was buried at the cemetery in 1854. The British Consul in Jeddah, James Zohrab, identified 13 British graves, five Austrians, four French Vice-Consuls and two Jewish graves at the cemetery in 1878.

A single Commonwealth War Graves Commission (CWGC) gravestone is in the cemetery, that of Private John Arthur Hogan of the British Army's Royal Army Service Corps. Hogan died on 3 June 1944 in the Second World War. Jean-Baptiste Lapadu-Hargues, a French soldier of the First World War is also buried in the cemetery. Cyril Ousman, the British Vice-consul of Jeddah who was shot and killed by Prince Mishari bin Abdulaziz Al Saud in 1951 is also buried here.

Recent burials have been rare and infrequent, and are mostly of Indian and Filipino children. Burials require the approval of the Mayor of Jeddah. The cemetery had reached maximum capacity by 2006.

The cemetery is hidden from sight by high trees. There is no sign to indicate its existence. In a 2011 article for The Saudi Gazette, Matouq Al-Shareef reported that locals were reticent regarding the exact location of the cemetery and the cemetery guard would only provide information with the approval of the relevant local consulate. The supervision of the site is the responsibility of Western consulates in Jeddah.

The cemetery was already in existence in 1541 to bury Portuguese casualties resulting from the Ottoman–Portuguese wars. The Danish explorer Carsten Niebuhr made the first reference to a 'Christian Cemetery' in Jeddah on his 1762 map of the city drawn during the Danish Arabia expedition of the 1760s. Niebuhr's cemetery was located close to or at the exact location of the present cemetery, just outside Jeddah's city walls. The walls of the cemetery may have been built by Muhammad Ali of Egypt in the aftermath of the Ottoman-Saudi wars of the 1810s. The walls protected against vandalism, local dogs, and the occasional flooding by the nearby Red Sea. The cemetery was vandalised following the Battle of Jeddah in 1925.

In 2018, the centenary of the end of the First World War was commemorated at the cemetery by representatives of foreign consulates in Jeddah who laid wreaths on the tombs of Hogan and Lapadu-Hargues.

An attack on the cemetery using an Improvised explosive device injured several people during the annual Armistice Day commemorations on 11 November 2020.

Commonwealth graves are managed by the Commonwealth War Graves Commission.

== 1990s renovations ==
The cemetery had fallen into disrepair since the 1920s, but was still used for the burials of non-Muslims. A committee was formed in the early 1990s by local consulates, and a company chosen by the German consulate was engaged to refurbish the cemetery in 1995. The renovations cost 350,000 riyals and were funded by the local consulate and donations from companies and individuals.

The cemetery was made level and the wall was repainted and repaired. Cenotaphs were cleaned and old concrete gravemarkers were replaced by marble tombstones. Gravemarkers of historic significance were moved against the western wall of the cemetery to maximise space. Vegetation including trees and vines were planted. In 2000, the Dutch Consulate, on behalf of the consulate committee, applied to the Saudi Ministry of Foreign Affairs for a new burial plot.

== See also ==
- Protestant Cemetery, Rome
