= Takreem USA =

TAKREEM AMERICA
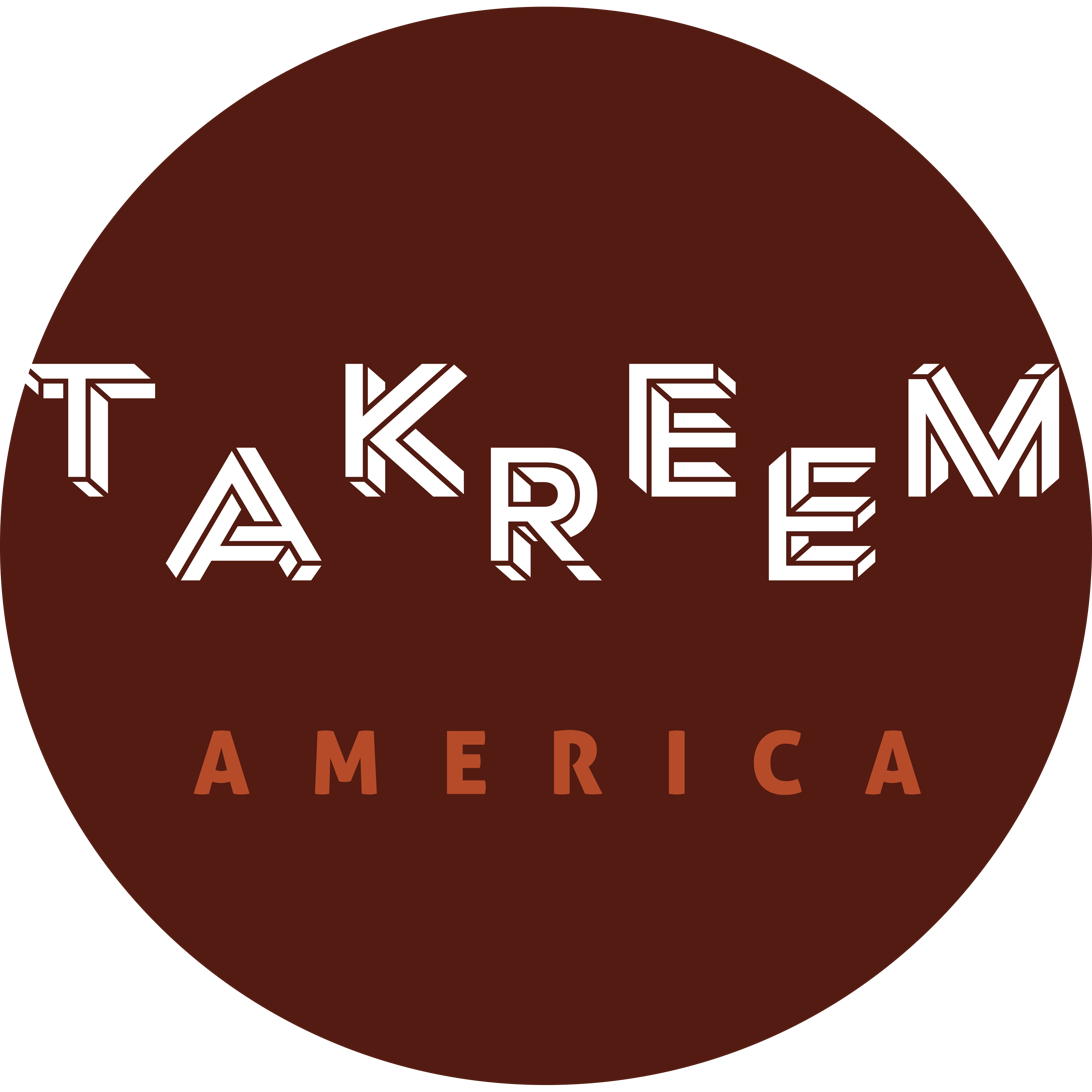
- Country: The awards ceremony takes place every year in a different American city
- Reward: Memorial award
- First award: 2019; 7 years ago
- Final award: 2026
- Number of laureates: 42 laureates (as of 2026)
- Website: takreemamerica.org

Takreem America also known as Takreem USA is a non-profit organization founded in 2019 focused on recognizing Arab American contributions and fostering connections with their countries of origin.

Ricardo Karam came up with the idea of Takreem in 2004 and launched it officially in 2009. In 2019, Takreem expanded its activities to include the United States and reach out to the Arab diaspora in the two continents of America; to be a launch announcement (Takreem America), The first honoring ceremony was held in February 2022 in Miami, Florida at the Ritz Carlton, Coconut Grove.

Takreem America hosted its 2nd annual weekend in Los Angeles, California. in February, 2023 at Millennium Biltmore Hotel to highlight contributions of the Arab diaspora.

In April 2024, Takreem America held its annual weekend in Boston, Massachusetts at the Copley Place.

== Activities ==
Takreem America first get-together took place in Miami, Florida, in February 2022. It consisted of an Awards ceremony, a gala dinner, and a series of talks and panels. The gala dinner raised funds for Lebanese students in the USA struggling to pay university fees due to Lebanon’s liquidity crisis.

In 2023, the organization held its annual weekend at the Millennium Biltmore Hotel in Los Angeles, where it recognized the laureates for their achievements.

In 2024, Takreem America’s annual weekend took place in Boston Massachusetts, with the Awards Gala held at Copley Place and the TAKminds Forum hosted at MIT in Cambridge, focusing on 'Ripples of Impact' and discussions on Arab-American contributions. The event brought together over 500 participants to celebrate Arab-American collaboration across art, entrepreneurship, and AI. The juries and advisory committees came together at the Hôtel Metropole, Monte-Carlo to announce the winners and distribute awards.

In 2025, the weekend was held in Washington, D.C., with the Awards Gala at The Ritz-Carlton and the TAKminds Forum at The Phillips Collection, centered on the theme “Speaking Influence: Culture, Politics & Business in a Connected World.”

In 2026, the weekend was held in Houston, Texas, with the Awards Gala at The Post Oak Hotel at Uptown Houston, bringing together distinguished guests for a celebration of Arab excellence and achievement.
