= Historic Jeddah Festival =

Annual festival held in Jeddah, Saudi Arabia

- Status: Active
- Frequency: Annually
- Location: Old town of Jeddah
- Country: Saudi Arabia
- Major events: Cultural

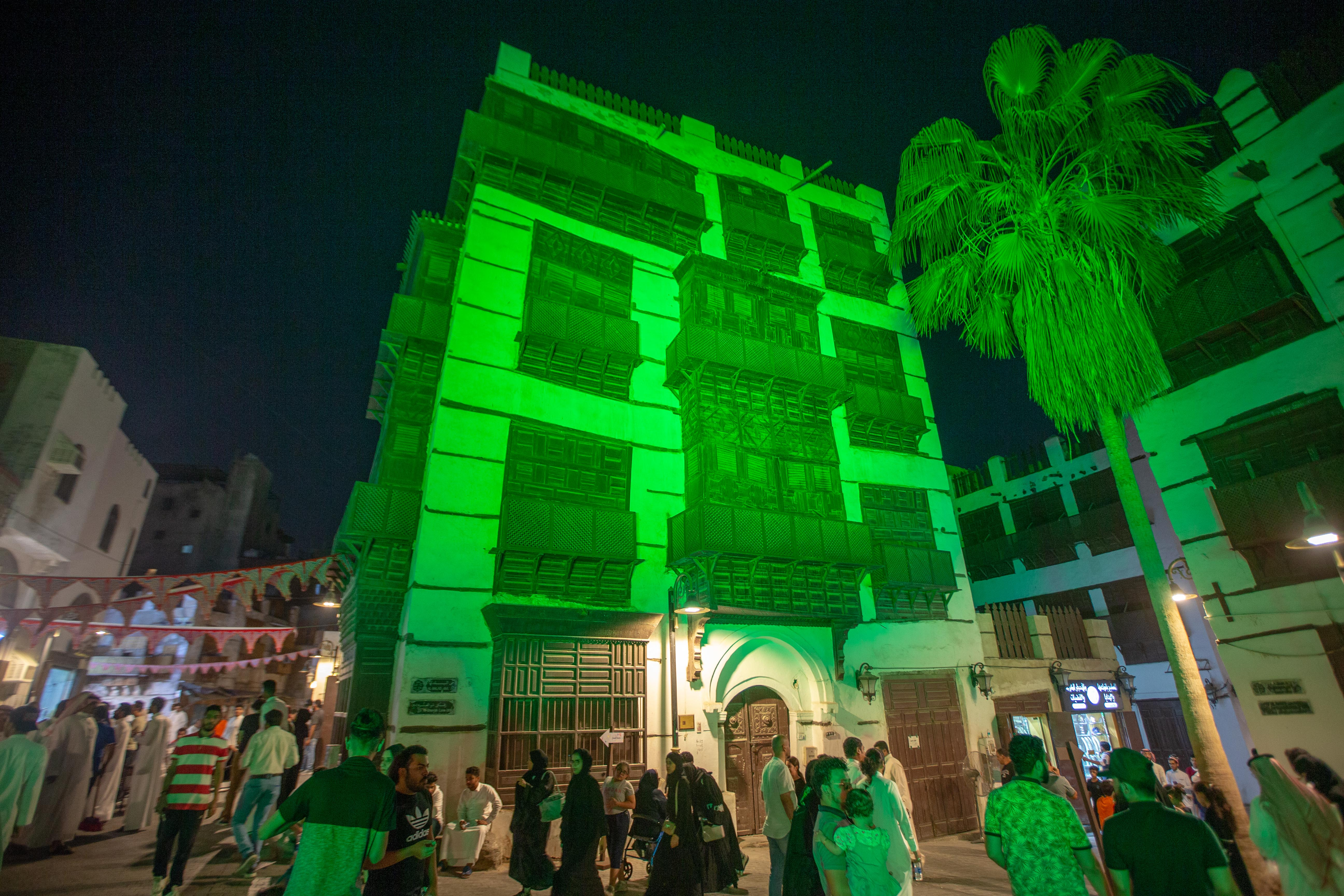
Historic Jeddah Center

The Historic Jeddah Festival is an annual festival held in the Al Balad district of Jeddah, western Saudi Arabia, and usually coincides with the month of Ramadan. The festival celebrates the culture and heritage of Jeddah.

== Activities ==
The activities and events in the Historic Jeddah Festival mainly focus on daily life in old Jeddah during the past decades. The area where the festival is held includes historical buildings and mosques as well as historic open squares, like Al-Mazloom, Al-Sham, Al-Yemen, and Al-Bahr Haras.

== See also ==
- Al-Balad, Jeddah
