= Mishari bin Abdulaziz Al Saud =

Saudi royal and businessman (1932–2000)

- Born: 1932; Saudi Arabia
- Died: 23 May 2000 (aged 67–68); United States
- Burial: Al Adl cemetery, Mecca
- Issue: Maha bint Mishari; Hala bint Mishari; Mohammed bin Mishari
Names
- Mishari bin Abdulaziz bin Abdul Rahman bin Faisal Al Saud
- House: Al Saud
- Father: King Abdulaziz
- Mother: Bushra

Mishari bin Abdulaziz Al Saud (Arabic: مشاري بن عبد العزيز آل سعود; 1932 – 23 May 2000) was a Saudi Arabian businessman. He was a member of the House of Saud.

== Early life and activities ==
Prince Mishari was born in 1932. He was a son of King Abdulaziz and Bushra who was one of the concubines of King Abdulaziz.

Prince Mishari was a businessman and a poet. He owned a company, Al Saada Trading and Contracting, in Jeddah.

== Personal life ==
One of his spouses was a Syrian-origin woman from Aleppo who was the mother of Princess Maha.

His son, Prince Mohammed bin Mishari, is a member of the Allegiance Council. His daughter, Maha bint Mishari, is an academic at Alfaisal University’s College of Medicine and a physician at King Faisal Specialist Hospital and Research Centre.

Prince Mishari died in the United States at age 68 on 23 May 2000. He was buried at Al Adl cemetery in Mecca.

== The murder of Cyril Ousman ==
Cyril Ousman was a British citizen who had been in Arabia since 1929 and worked as an engineer. Later he became the British vice-consul in Jeddah. He held a party on 16 November 1951 where Prince Mishari, aged nineteen, was among the guests. According to a 1952 report by Time magazine, Prince Mishari became heavily intoxicated during the gathering at Ousman's home and began making unwanted advances towards an English woman who was among the guests. Ousman intervened and ordered the prince to leave the residence.

The following day, still reportedly drunk and enraged, Mishari returned demanding that the woman be handed over to him. When Ousman again attempted to eject him from the house, the prince drew a pistol and opened fire. Ousman was killed instantly, while his wife was wounded in the shooting.

Ousman was buried the next day in Jeddah's non-Muslim cemetery. In 1952, King Abdulaziz imposed a total ban on alcohol in his kingdom. Ousman's wife left Jeddah quietly, accepting the compensation offered by King Abdulaziz. Mishari was sentenced to life imprisonment. He was spared the death penalty due to his royal status. Mishari was released during the reign of King Saud.

Raymond A. Hare, then US Ambassador to Saudi Arabia, said in a letter to US Foreign Service dated 25 November 1951 that the murder was very similar to a scene in an American movie that Prince Mishari, Cyril Ousman and his wife had watched together only a few days before the incident.
