= Shining Stars of Hope =

Charitable cultural initiative by the TAKREEM Foundation

Shining Stars of Hope is a charitable cultural initiative launched by the TAKREEM Foundation that provides financial support to Lebanese actors, actresses, and performing artists affected by Lebanon’s ongoing economic crisis. The initiative operates through fundraising concerts and related campaigns, with proceeds distributed to artists facing financial hardship.

== History ==
Shining Stars of Hope was launched in December 2023 by the TAKREEM Foundation. The inaugural fundraising concert was held at Salle des Ambassadeurs, Casino du Liban, in Jounieh.
