= Georgios Schwartz Mansion =

Historic house in Ampelakia, Greece

Coordinates: 39.8528°N 22.5542°E

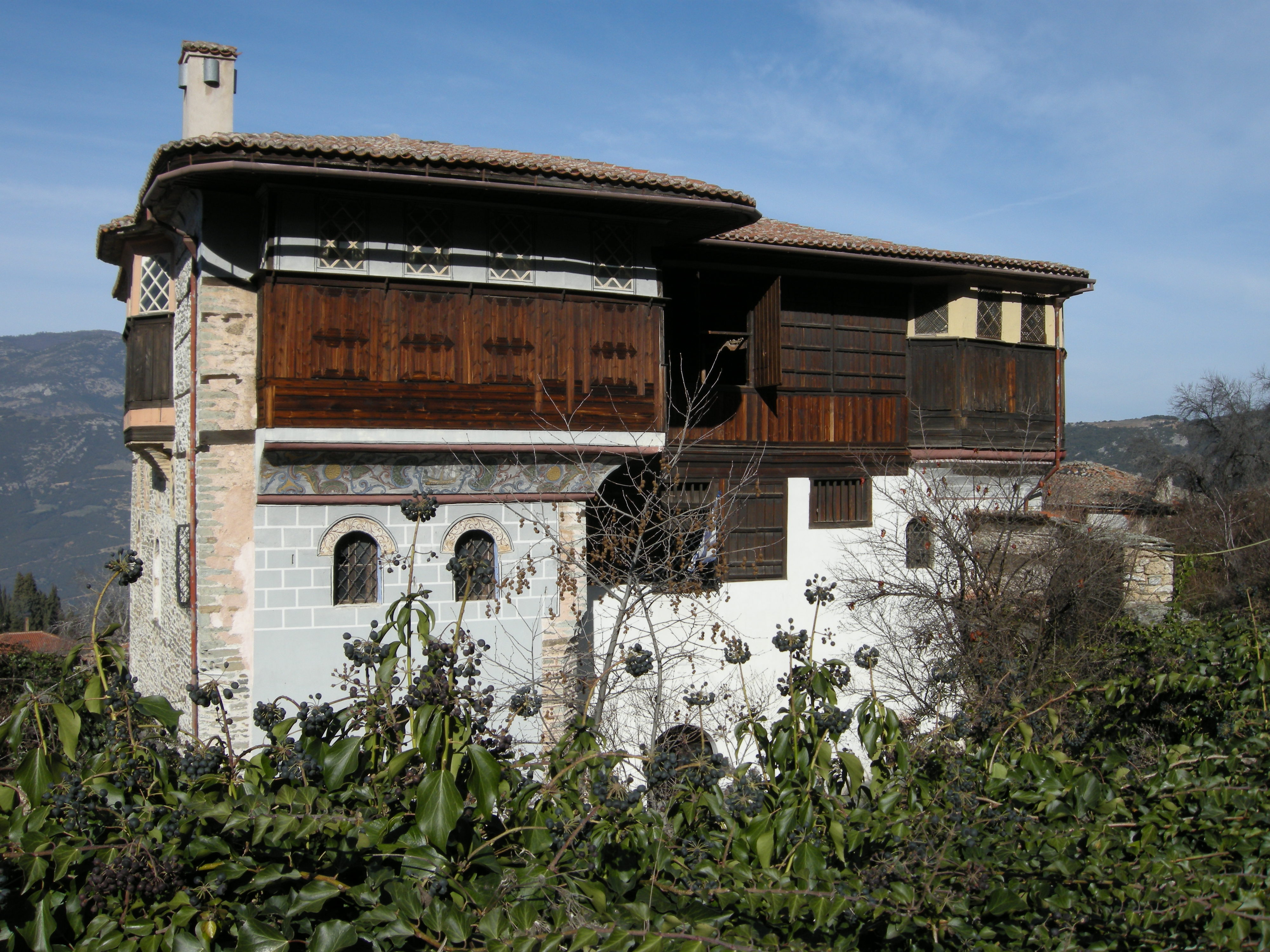
- Interactive map of Georgios Schwartz Mansion
- Type: Konak
- Completion date: c.1790s

The Georgios Schwartz Mansion (Greek: Αρχοντικό Γεωργίου Σβάρτς) is an Ottoman-era residence located in the Greek village of Ampelakia, in Tempi, Thessaly. Constructed near the end of the 18th century, the building currently serves as a folklore museum.

== History ==
Geórgios Mávros (Note: Geórgios Mávros' Austrian business ties explain the translation of his surname into German, the terms "mávros" and "schwartz" both meaning "black." The Manor of Ampelakia is still often called by the German patronymic of its former owner.) (1738–1824) served in the prestigious role of manager of the cooperative of farmers, artisans, workers, and merchants of Ampelakia, an organization which numbered 6,000 members who worked in diverse roles in the production and selling of red cotton threads. He was, moreover, the last financial manager of this foundation of the local economy, whose capital had been entrusted to the bank of Vienna.

At the end of the 18th century, Geórgios Mávros had an imposing home built in the village of Ampelakia, which served also as headquarters for the cooperative for some four decades The precise dates of construction vary from source to source, with some stating that the monument was built between 1778 and 1787, and others mentioning a worksite between 1787 and 1797 or 1798. The building was bought by the Greek government in 1965 and since has hosted a museum of folklore.

Restoration work was undertaken in 1986. Since 2022, a restoration of the interior décor, wooden elements, and outdoor spaces is underway. Conducted by the ephorate of Larissan antiquities, the project has been granted a budget of 600,000 euros and should be finished by the end of 2023.

== Architecture ==
The Georgios Schwartz Mansion is a building of three stories. On the ground floor was located the treasury of the cooperative, a vaulted hall in gray colors in which the reserves of gold and precious documents were held. In a slightly elevated space there was the hall where the members' meetings took place. The second story served as the family's winter residence, endowed with bedrooms with fireplaces and closets richly decorated with frescos, as well as kitchens and other service areas. A stairway led to the third story, which was laid out in the same manner as the floor below and which was used as a summer residence. This last story, which gave pride of place to wooden elements and tinted skylights, incorporates sachnisi, a type of bay window characteristic of the design of the Ottoman konaks in the Balkans.

The woodwork was done by Ioánnis Zerbinós and the murals were painted by a certain L. Lóli who also did the décor of another house in the village, Karasoúlis Manor. The interior of the Giorgios Schwartz Mansion forms an exceptional example of Ottoman art in Greece. The frescos represent views of Istanbul, geometric forms, and bucolic themes. The house's furnishings were partly of Central European make, and it also boasted a large library which included many works of Enlightenment philosophy and a copy of the Map of Greece by the philosopher Rigas Feraios, who frequented the village.

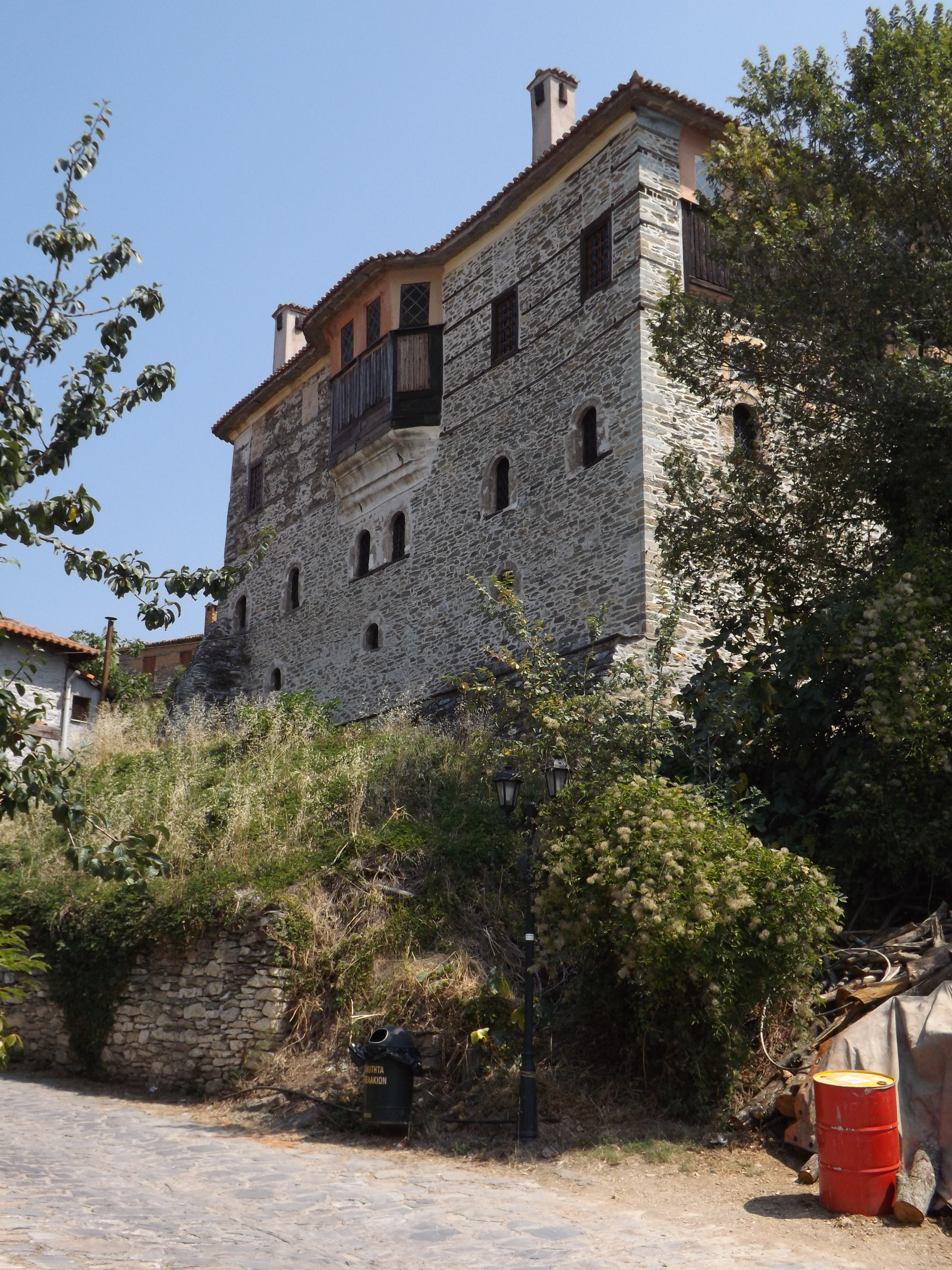
Exterior view from North-West.

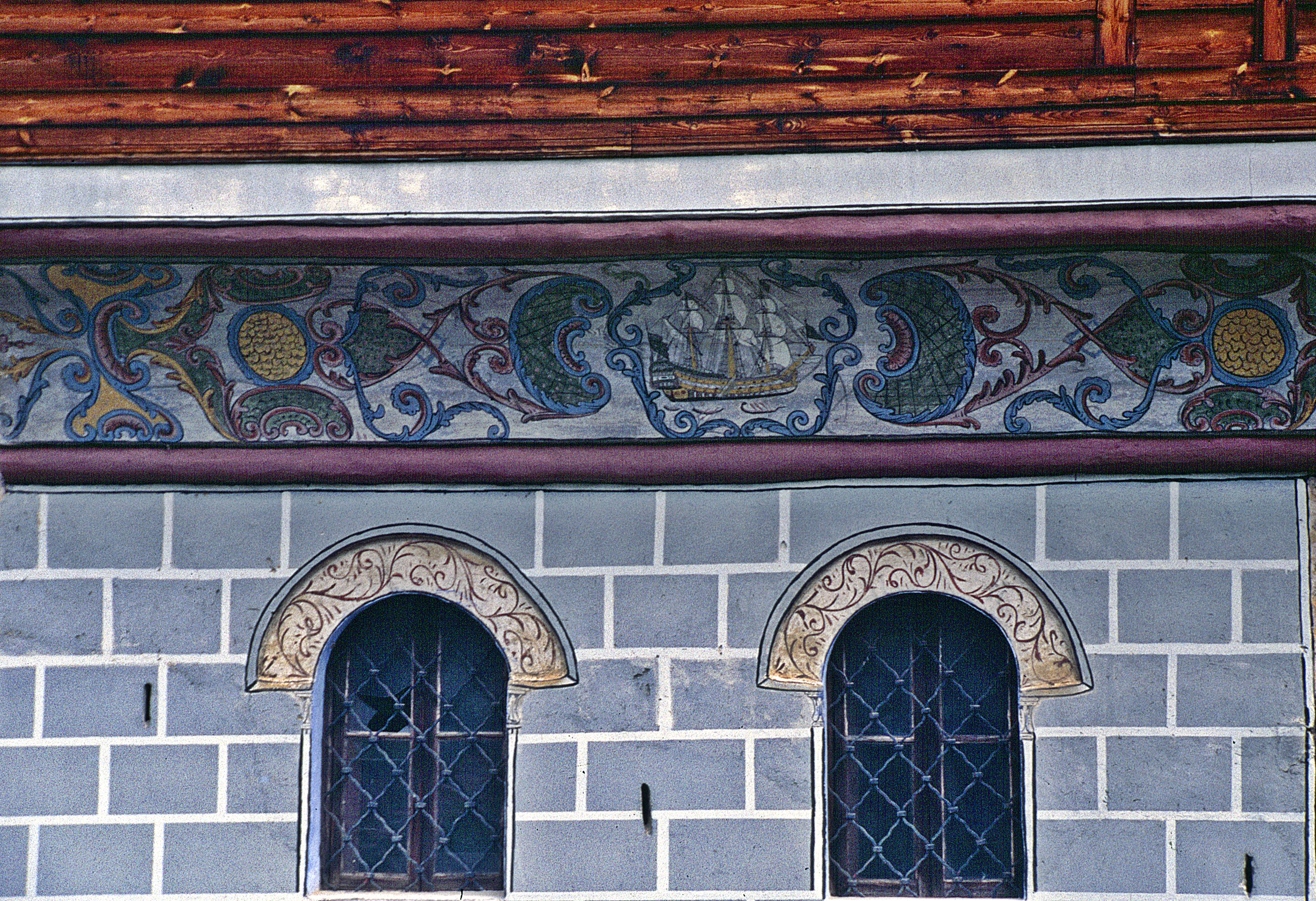
Detail of the decorations on the exterior masonry.

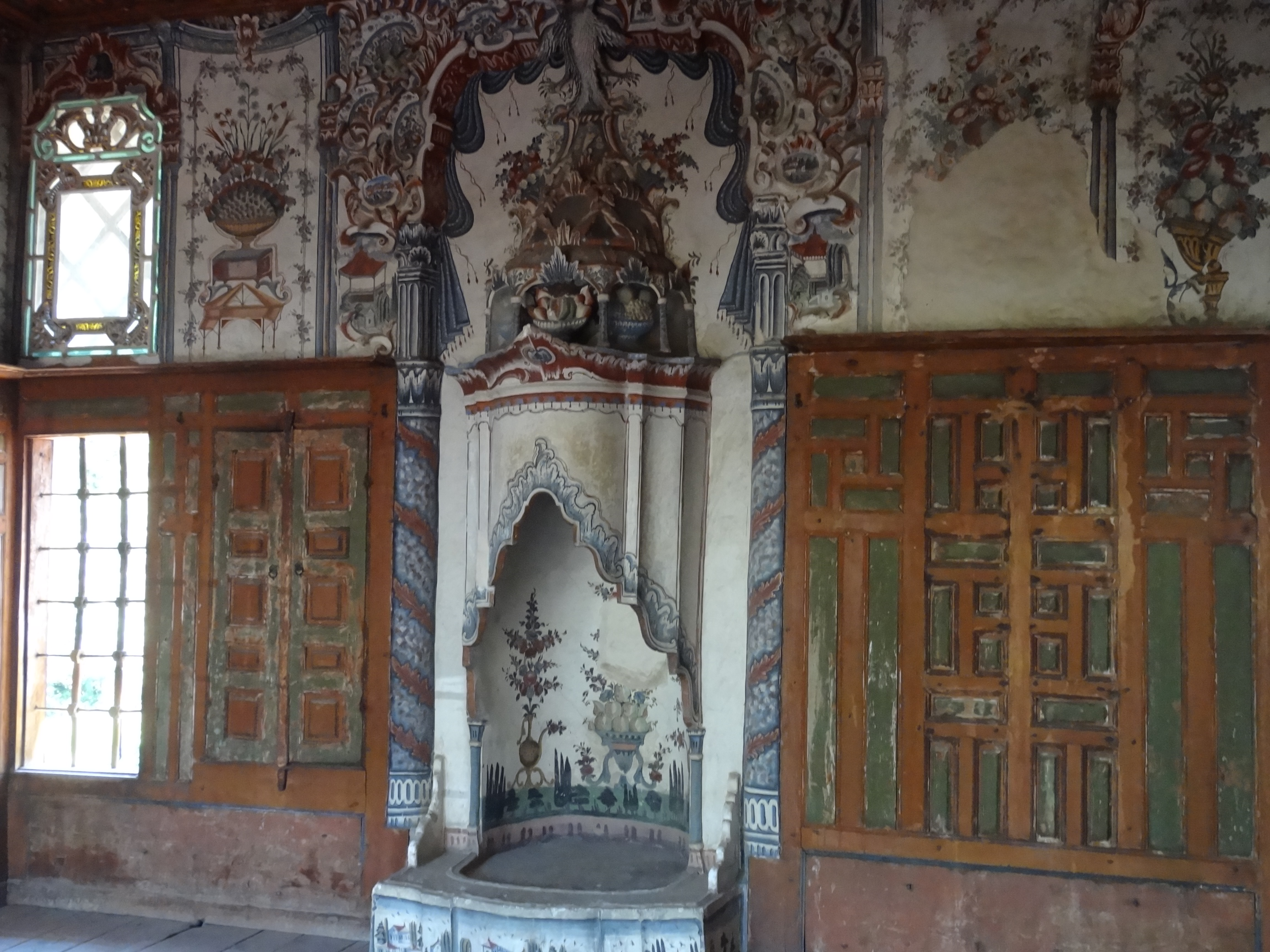
Eagle chimney on the second floor

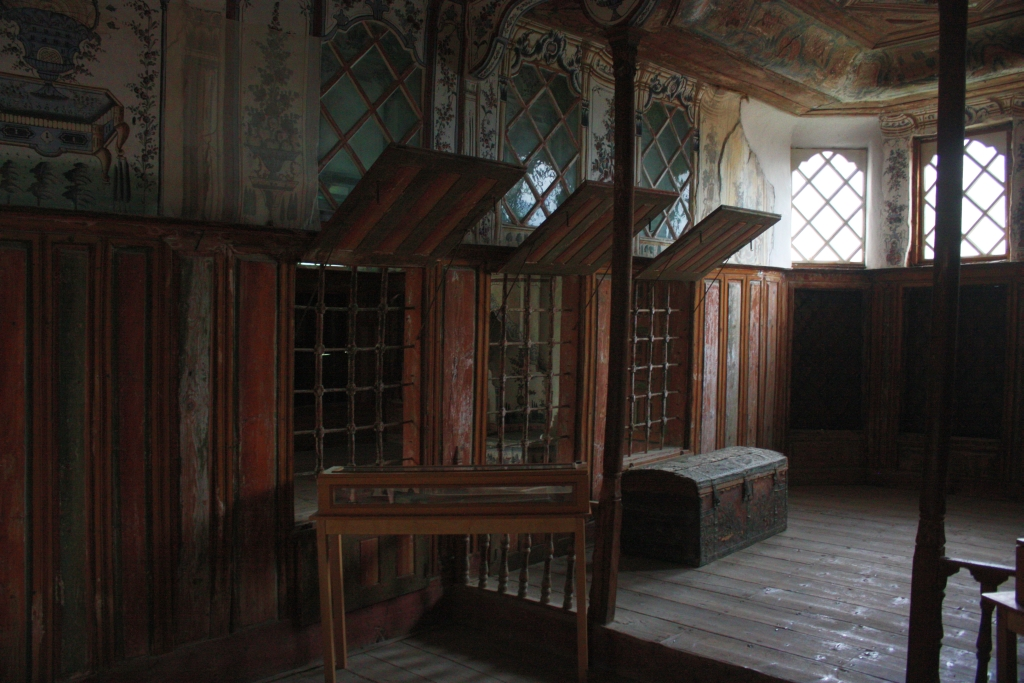
The third floor

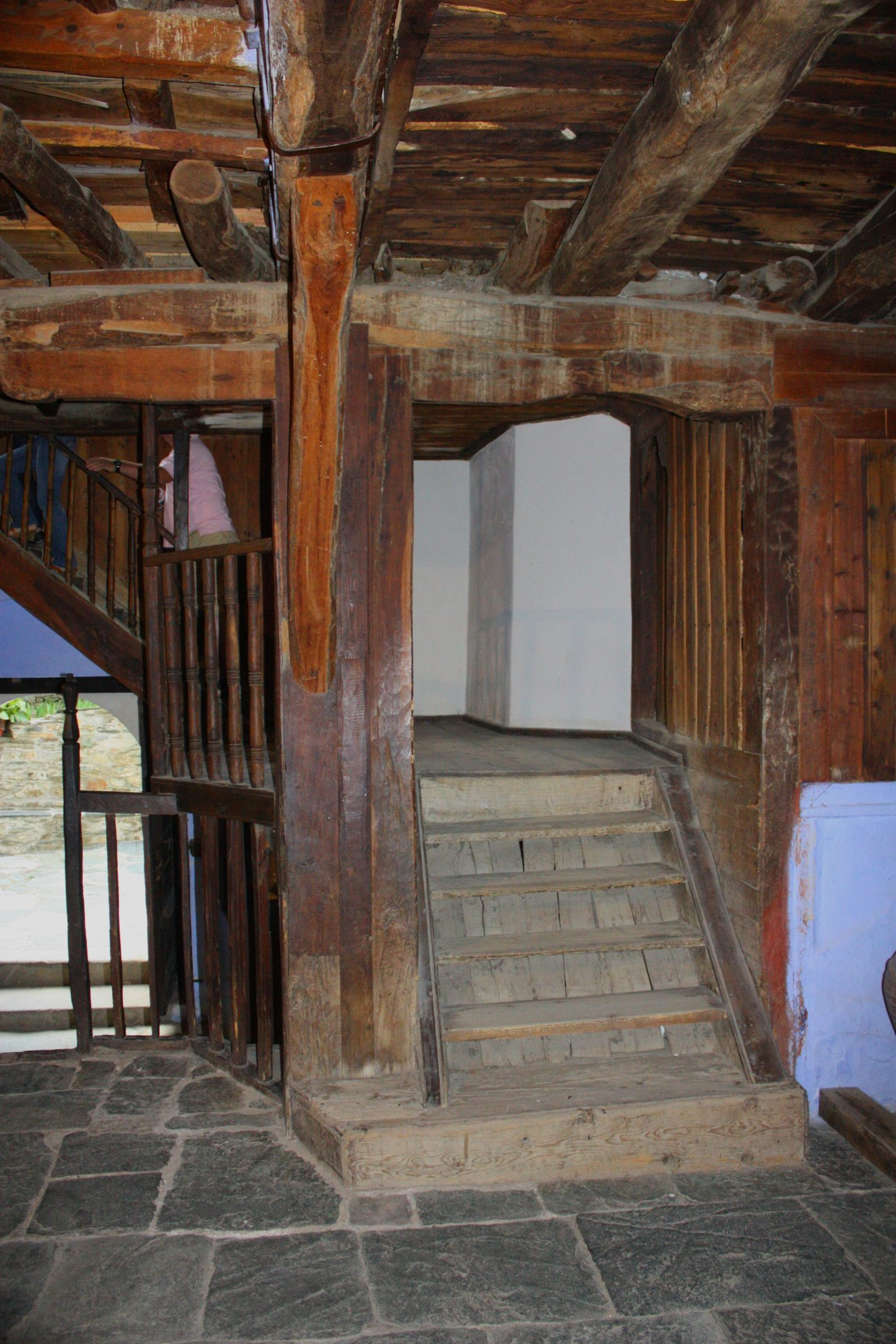
Staircase

== Notes and references ==
=== Bibliography ===
- Kassianí Mándrou (2018). Μη Επεμβατικές Μέθοδοι Ανάλυσης των Τοιχογραφιών στον Οντά του Αετού, στο Αρχοντικό Σβαρτς (PDF) (in Greek). Rhodes. p. 166.
- Souzána Choúlia (1994). Το αρχοντικό του Σβαρτς στα Αμπελάκια (in Greek). Athènes: Ministère de la Culture et des Sports. p. 32.
