= Oriel window =

Type of bay window

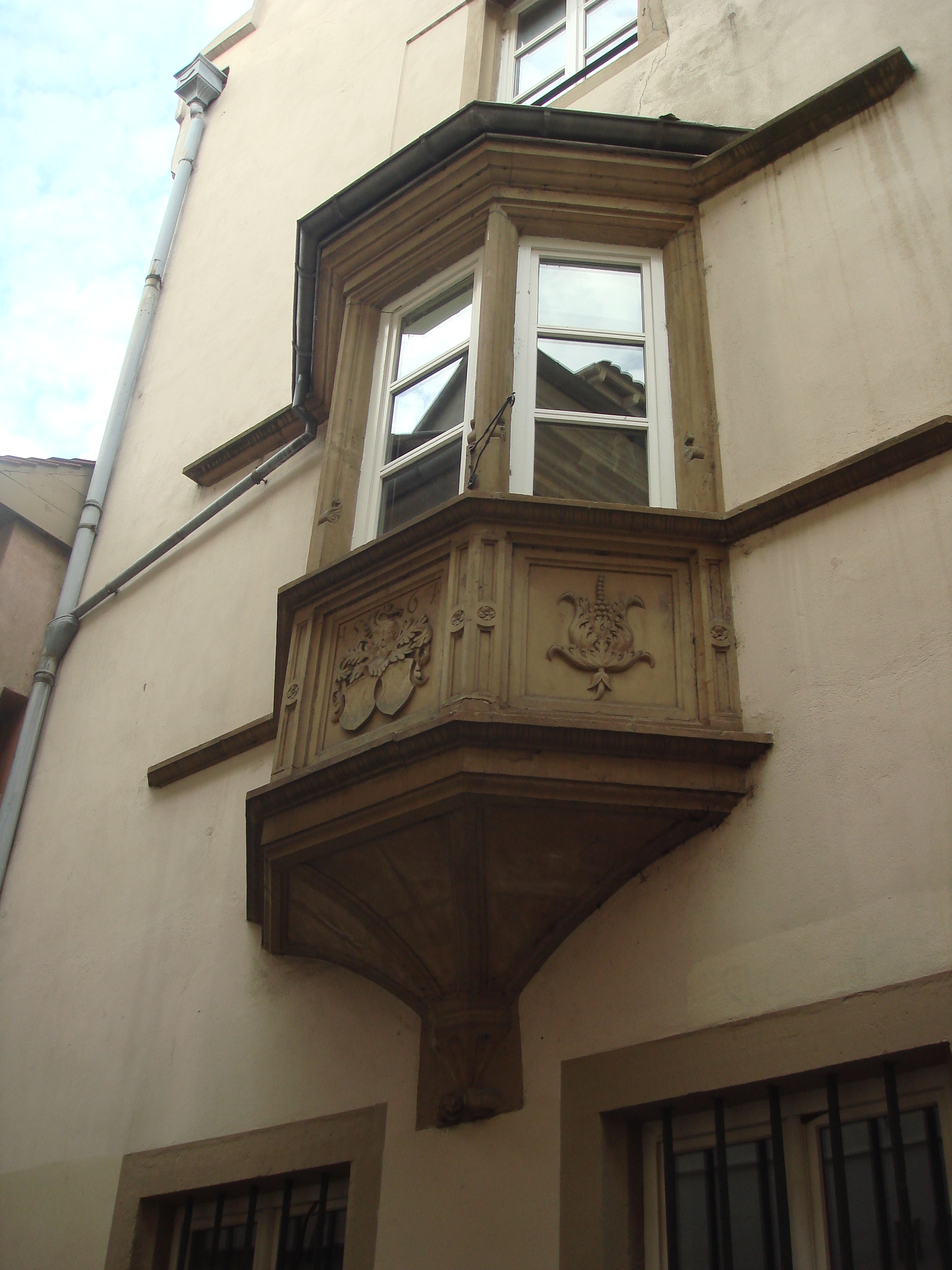
Oriel window, Grande Île, Strasbourg

An oriel window is a form of bay window which protrudes from the main wall of a building but does not reach to the ground. Supported by corbels, brackets, or similar cantilevers, an oriel window generally projects from an upper floor, but is also sometimes used on the ground floor.

== Etymology ==
According to the Oxford English Dictionary, the term oriel is derived from Anglo-Norman oriell and Late Latin oriolum, both meaning "gallery" or "porch", perhaps from Classical Latin aulaeum ("curtain").

== History ==
Oriel windows became popular in the 15th century. They allowed more sunlight into a room than did conventional windows, and were therefore popular in northern countries such as England. They also could increase the usable space in a house without changing the footprint of the building.

Oriel windows are seen in Arab architecture in the form of mashrabiya and in Turkish are known as şahnişin or cumba. In Islamic culture, these windows and balconies project from the street-front of a house, providing an area in which women could peer out and see the activities below whilst remaining out of line-of-sight.

== Notable examples ==
- Oriel College, Oxford, took its name from a balcony or oriel window forming a feature of a building which occupied the site the college now stands on.
- Oriel Chambers in Liverpool was a very controversial building when it was built, featuring an entire façade of glass oriel windows.
- Schaffhausen in Switzerland is also called "the city of 171 oriel windows" (German: Die Stadt der 171 Erker), followed by St. Gallen with 111 oriel windows.

== Gallery ==
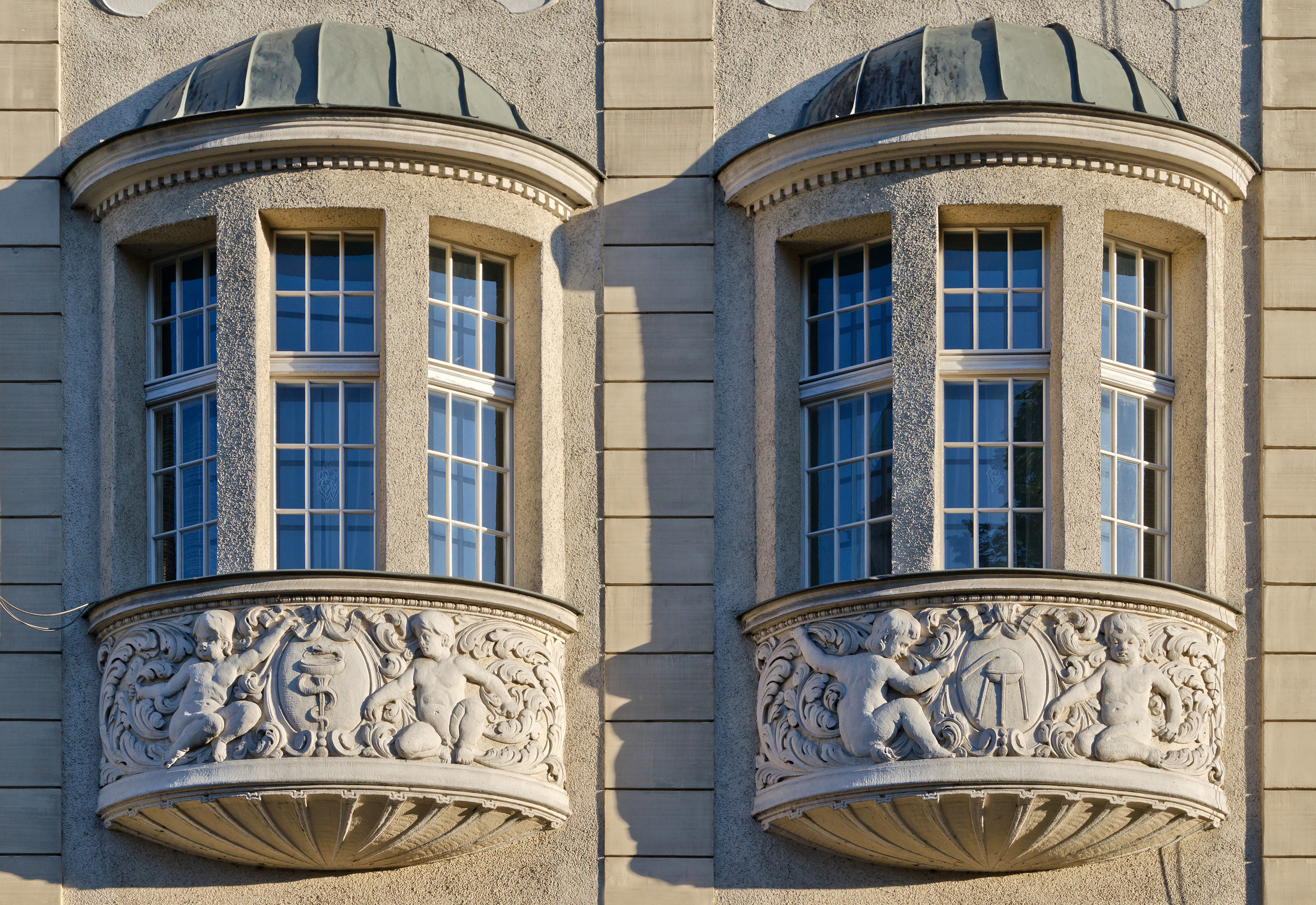
Oriel windows with elaborate detailing, Kłodzko, Poland

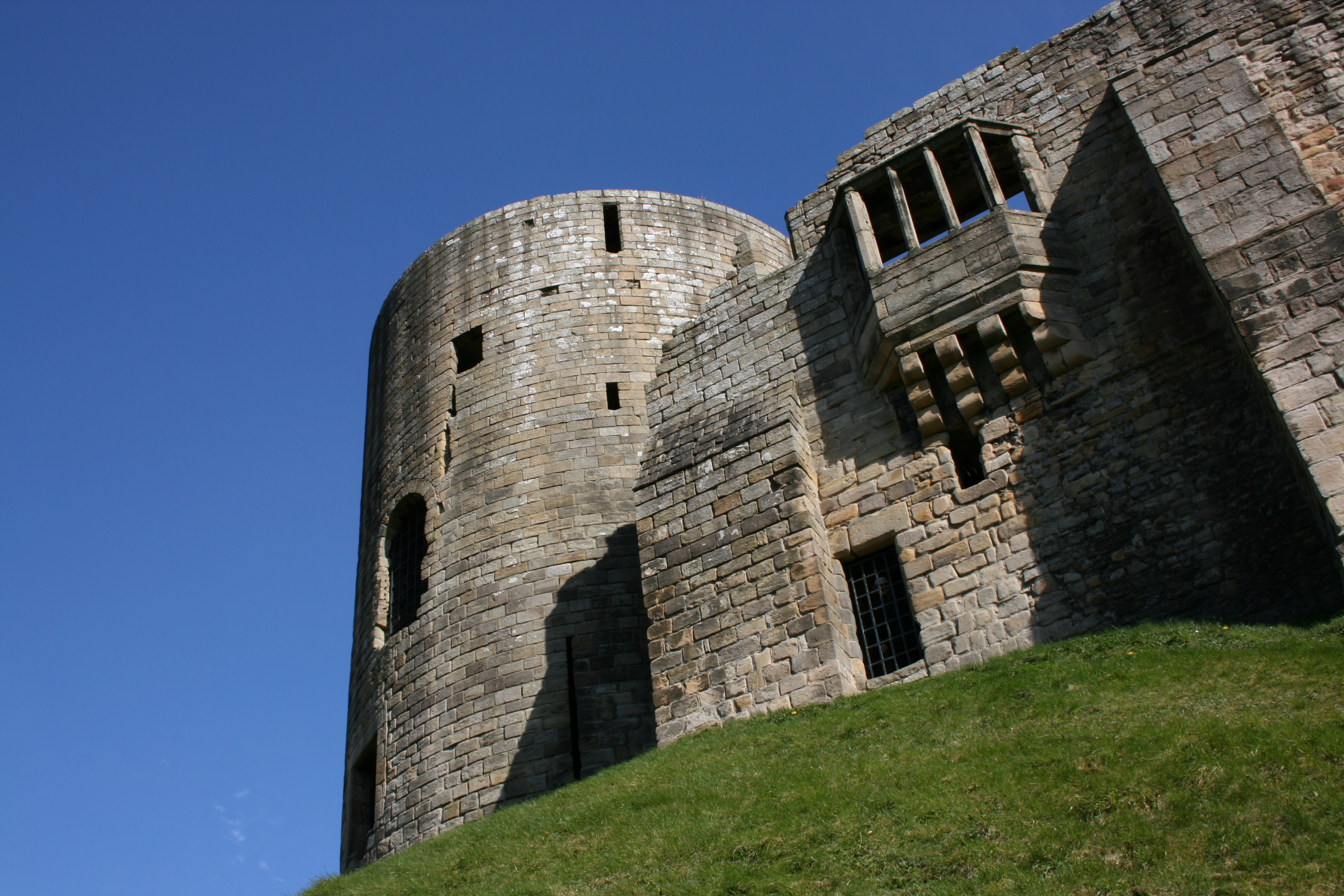
A 15th-century oriel window at Barnard Castle in County Durham, England.

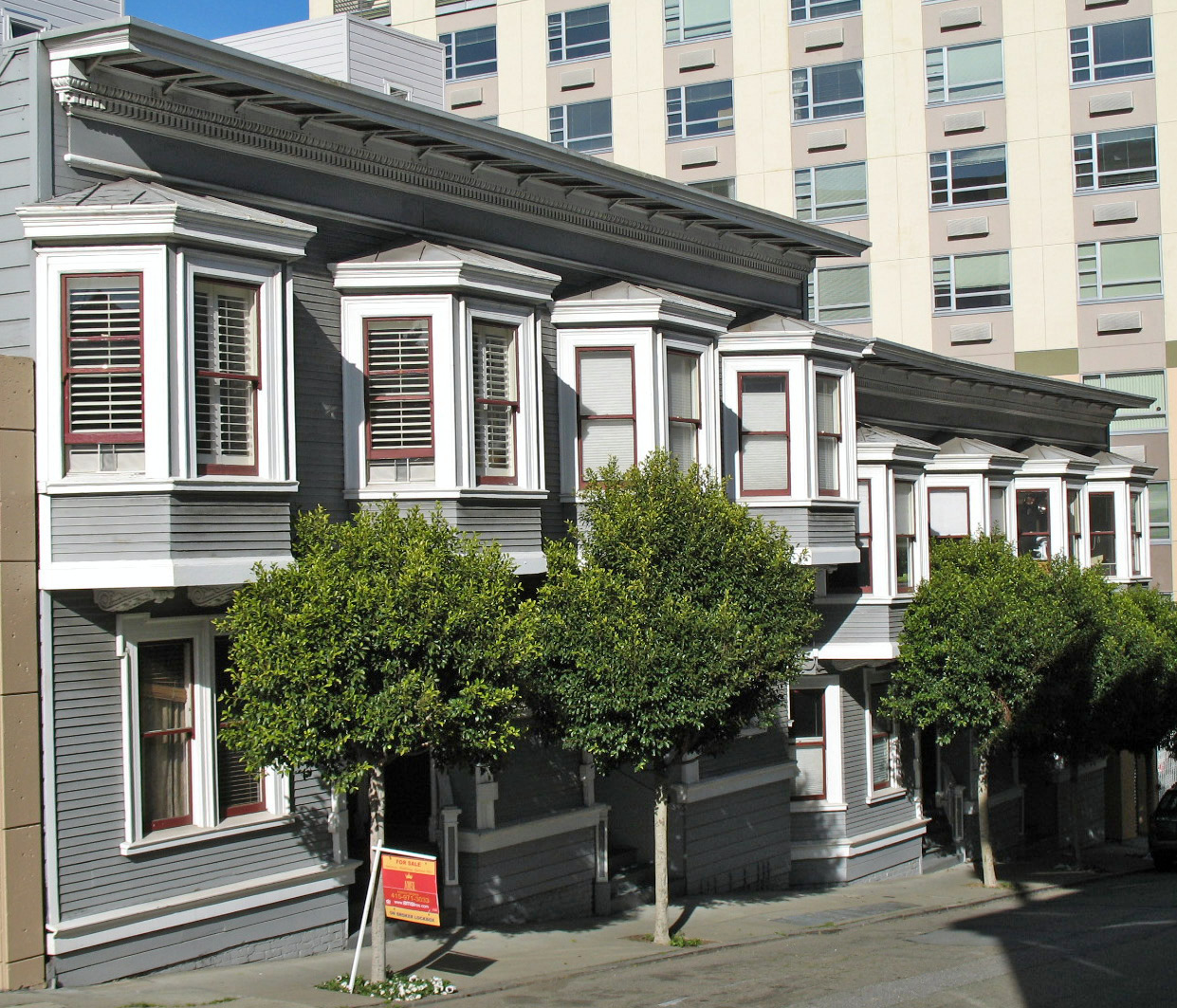
Oriel windows in San Francisco, California, USA

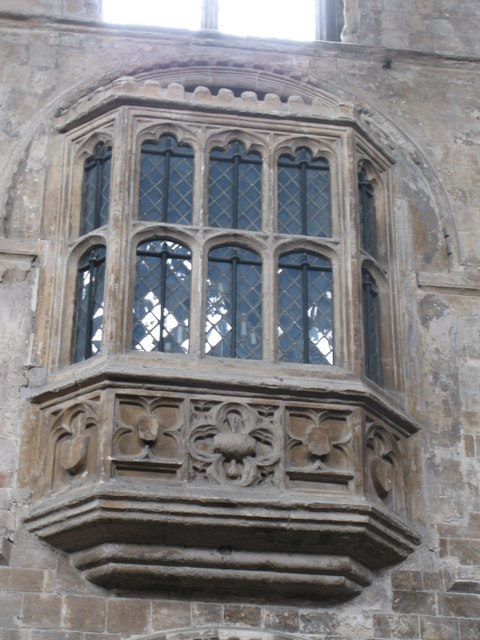
16th-century oriel window in the City of London, Priory Church of St Bartholomew the Great

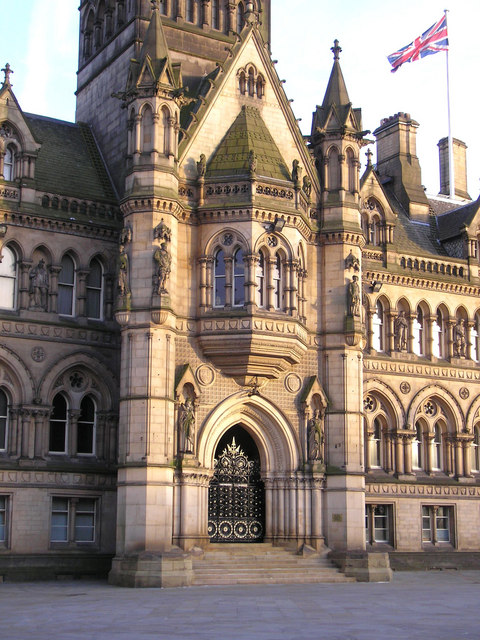
19th-century neo-Gothic oriel window on Bradford City Hall

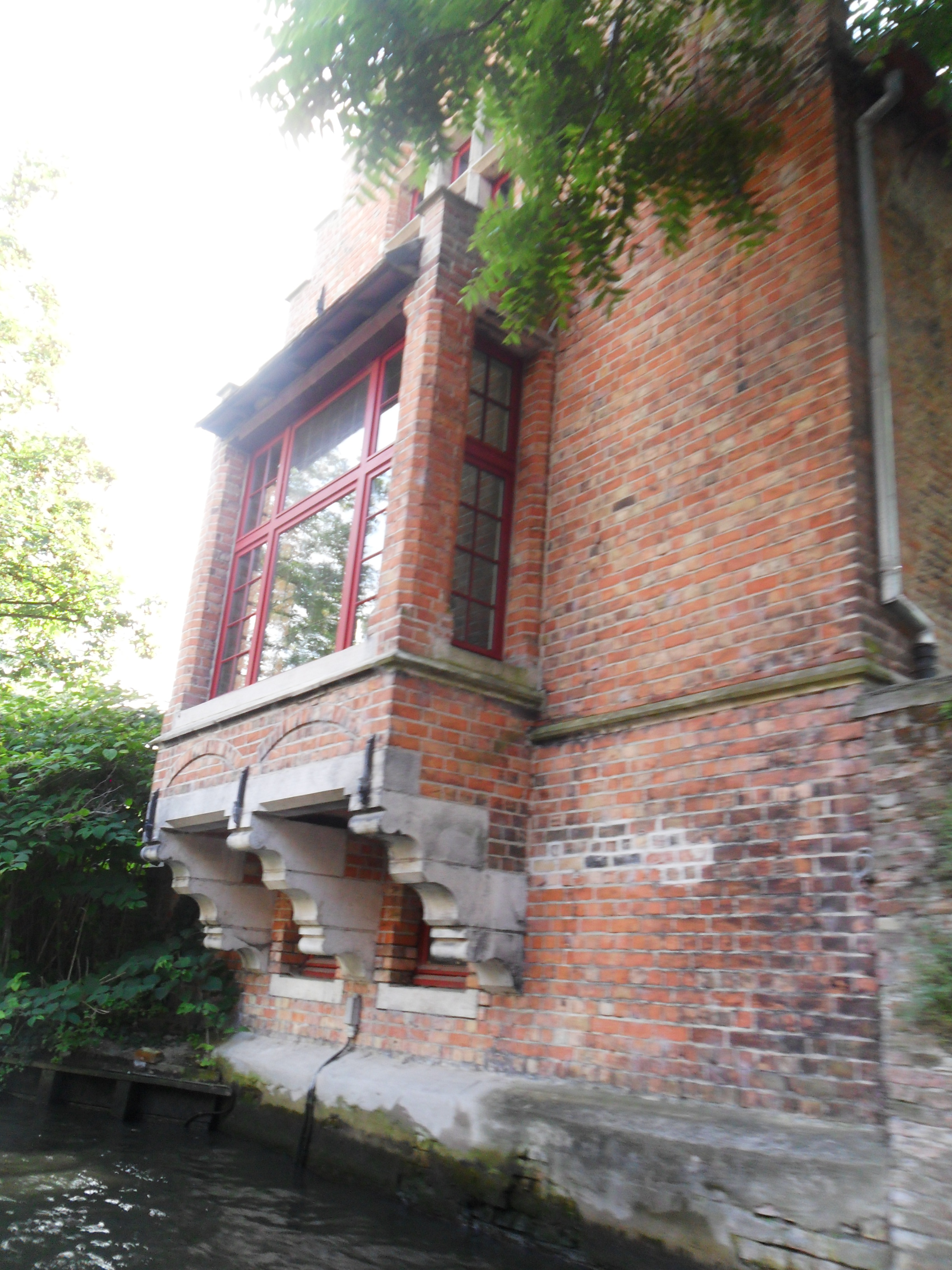
Masonry oriel window above a canal supported by corbelling, Bruges, Belgium

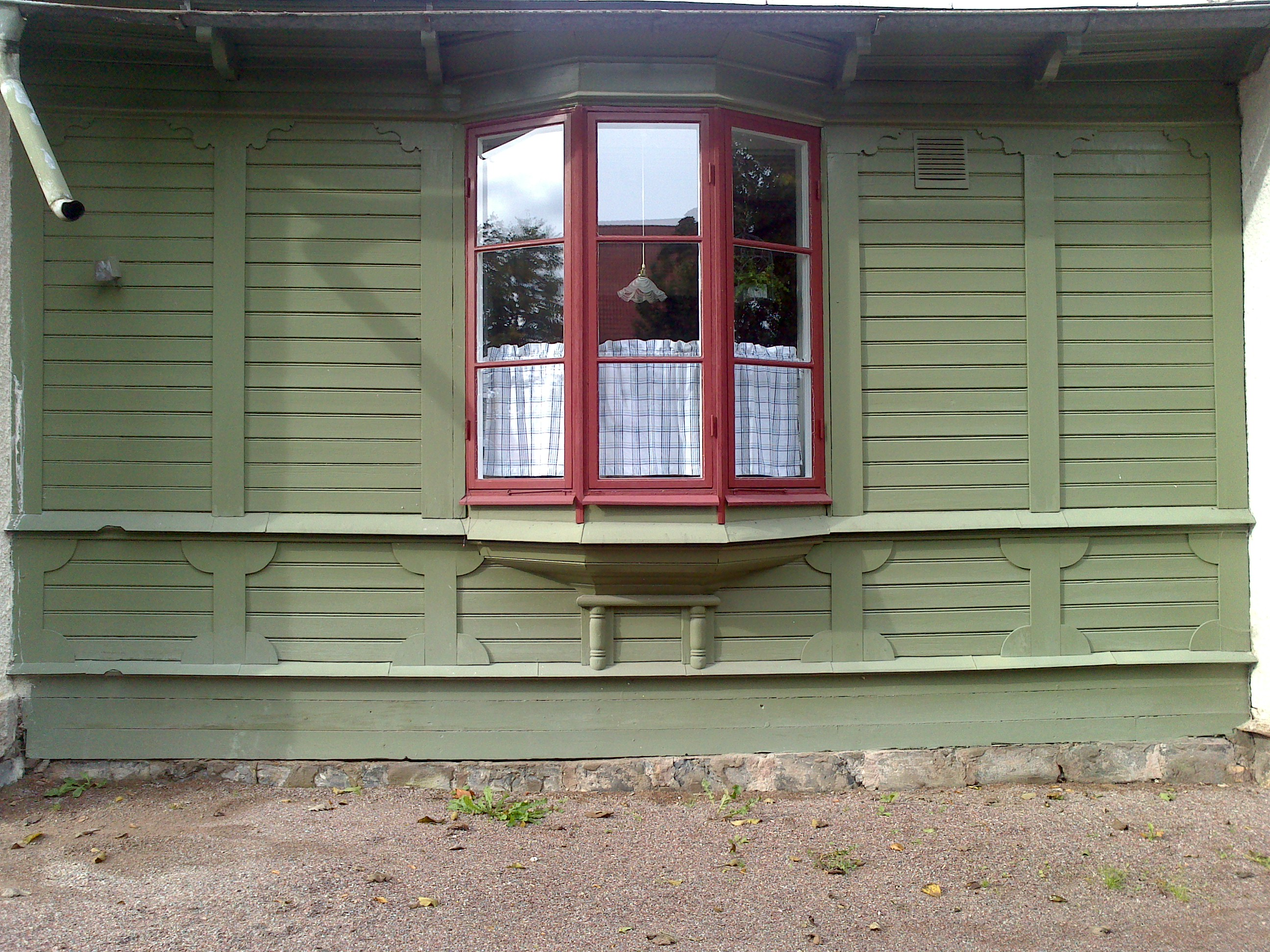
Ground-floor oriel window, Perssonska gården, Hedemora, Sweden

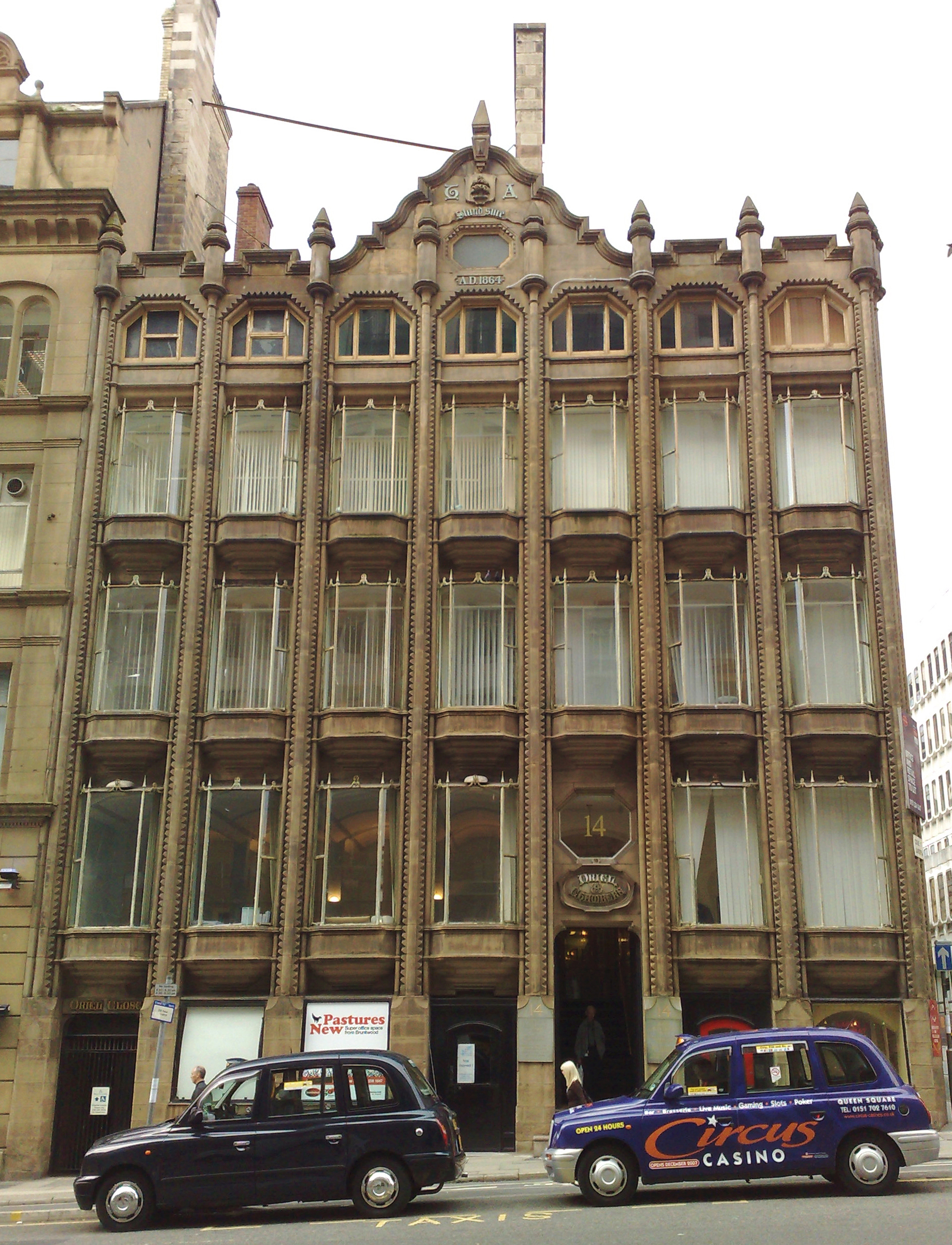
Oriel Chambers, Liverpool, by Peter Ellis, 1864

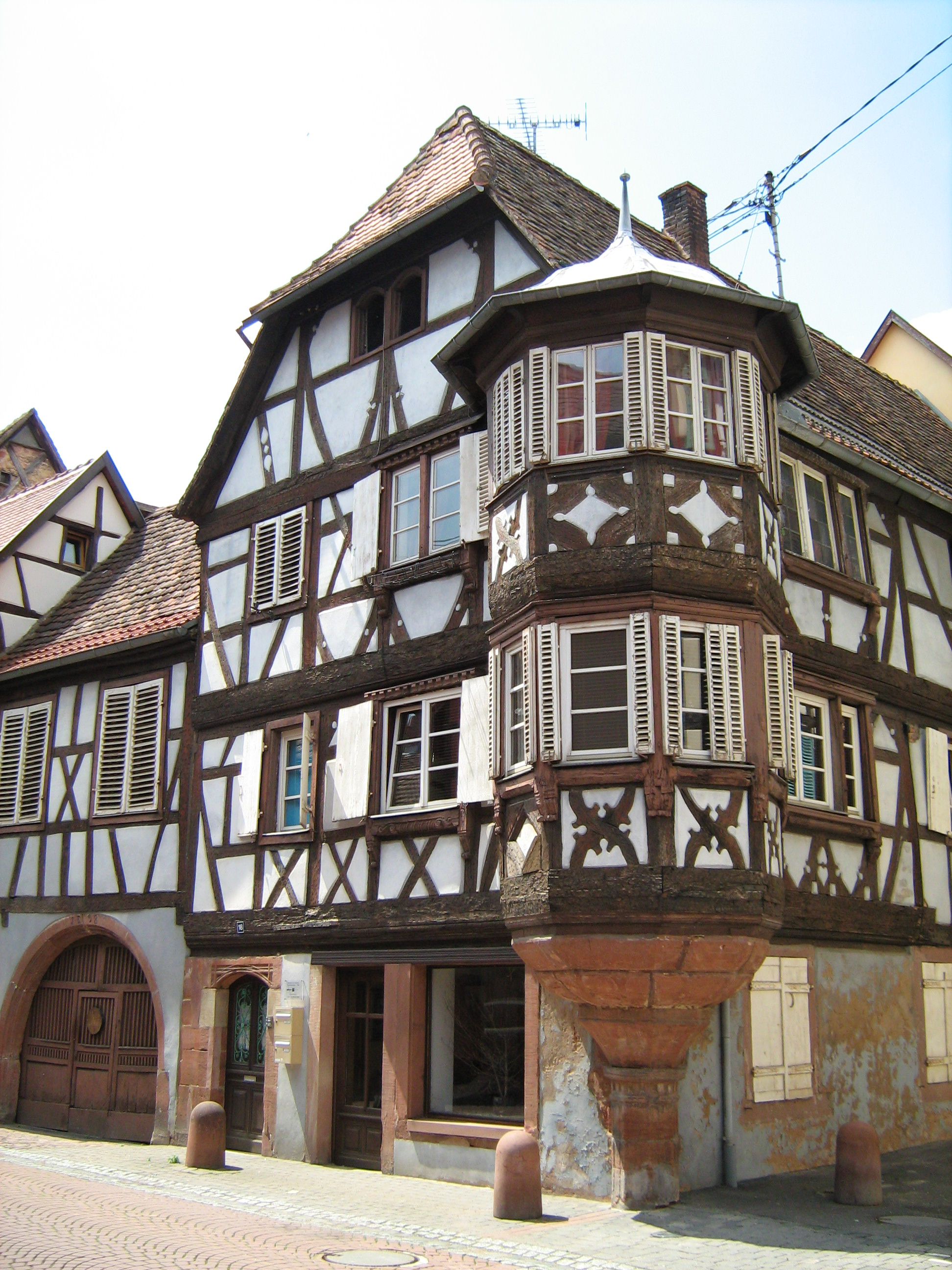
Massive half timbered oriel window on a pre-1581 house, Bouxwiller, Bas-Rhin, Alsace, France

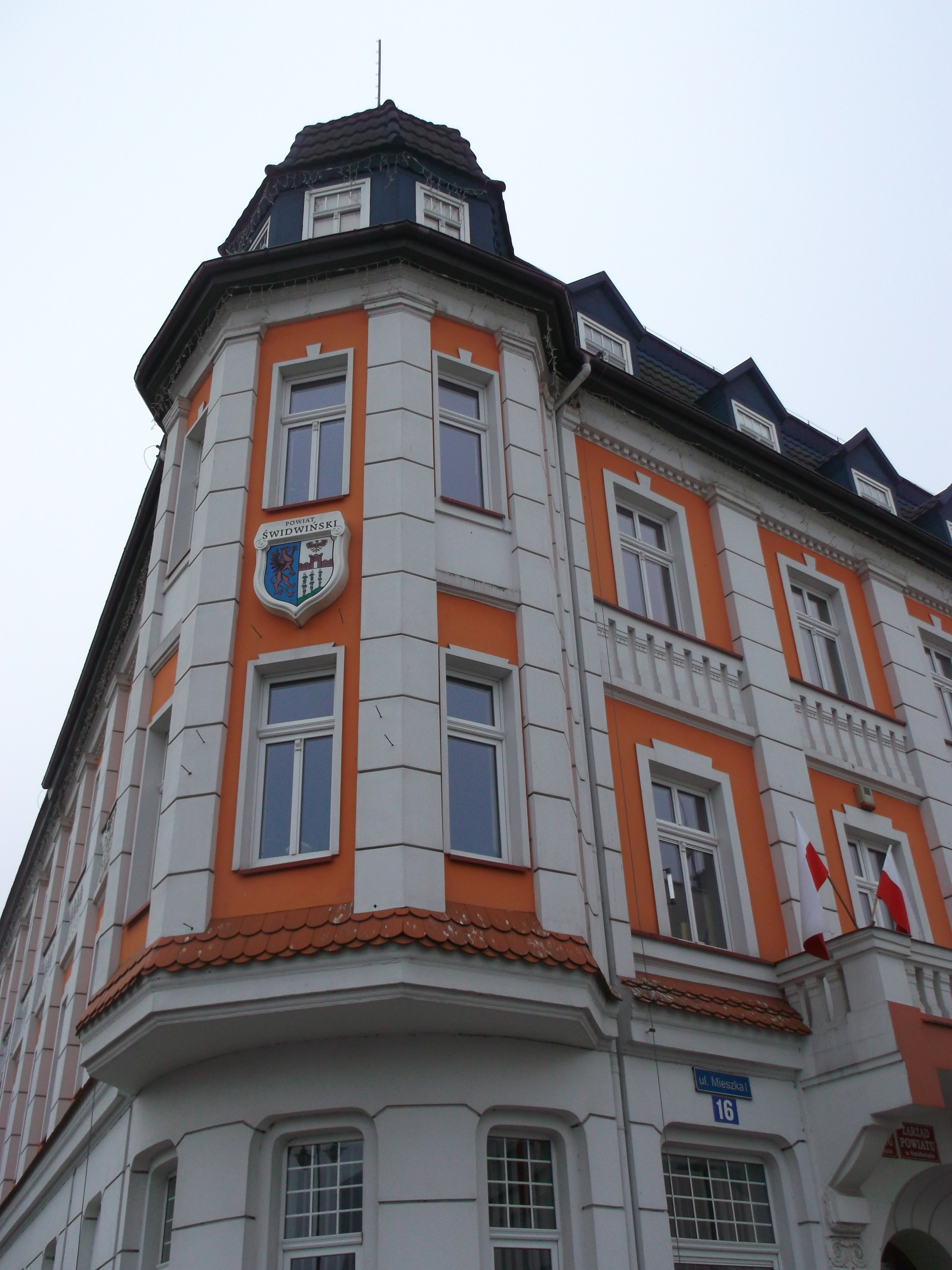
Large masonry oriel window of District Office in Świdwin, Poland

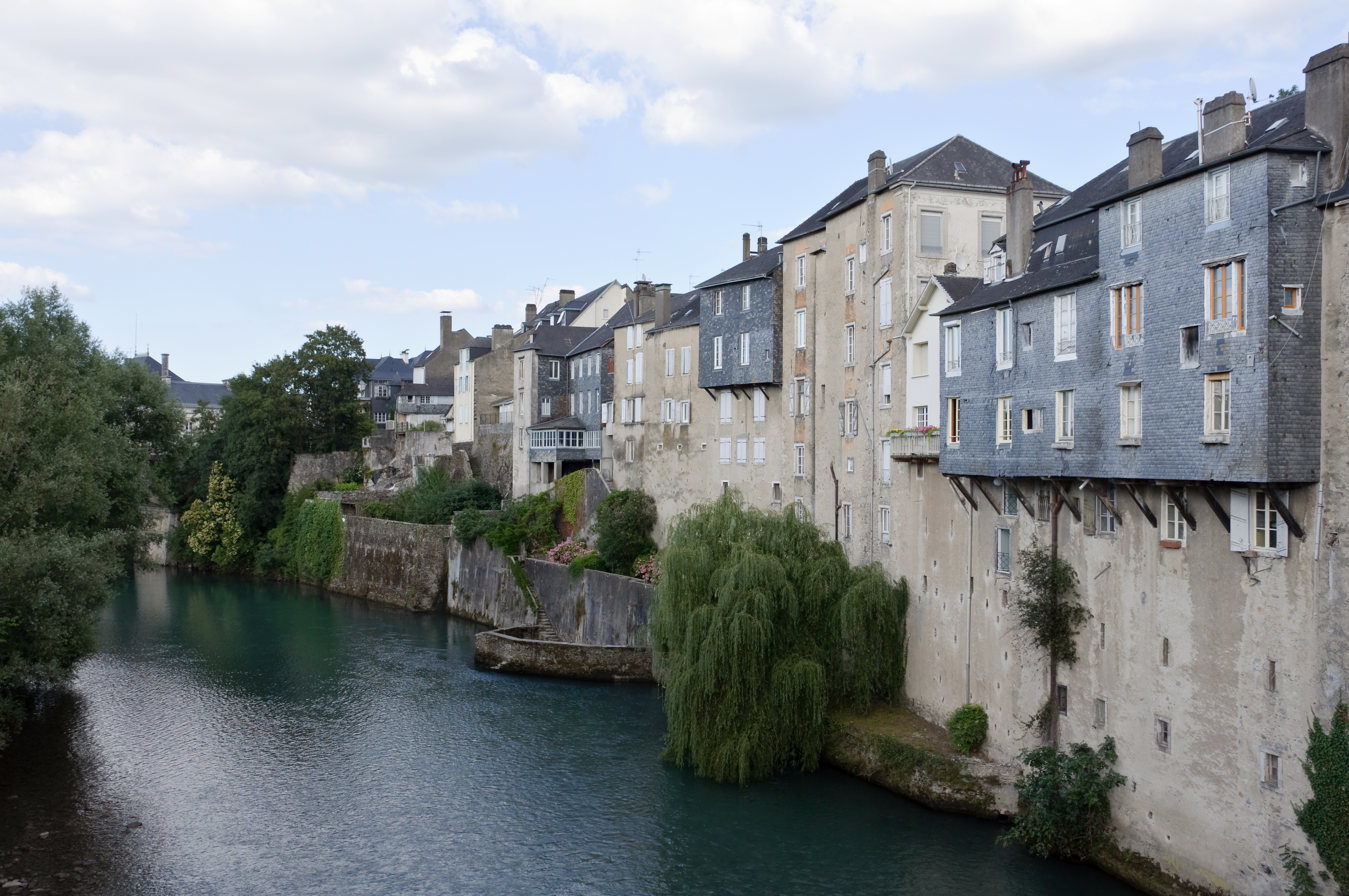
Oriel windows with brackets in Oloron-Sainte-Marie, France

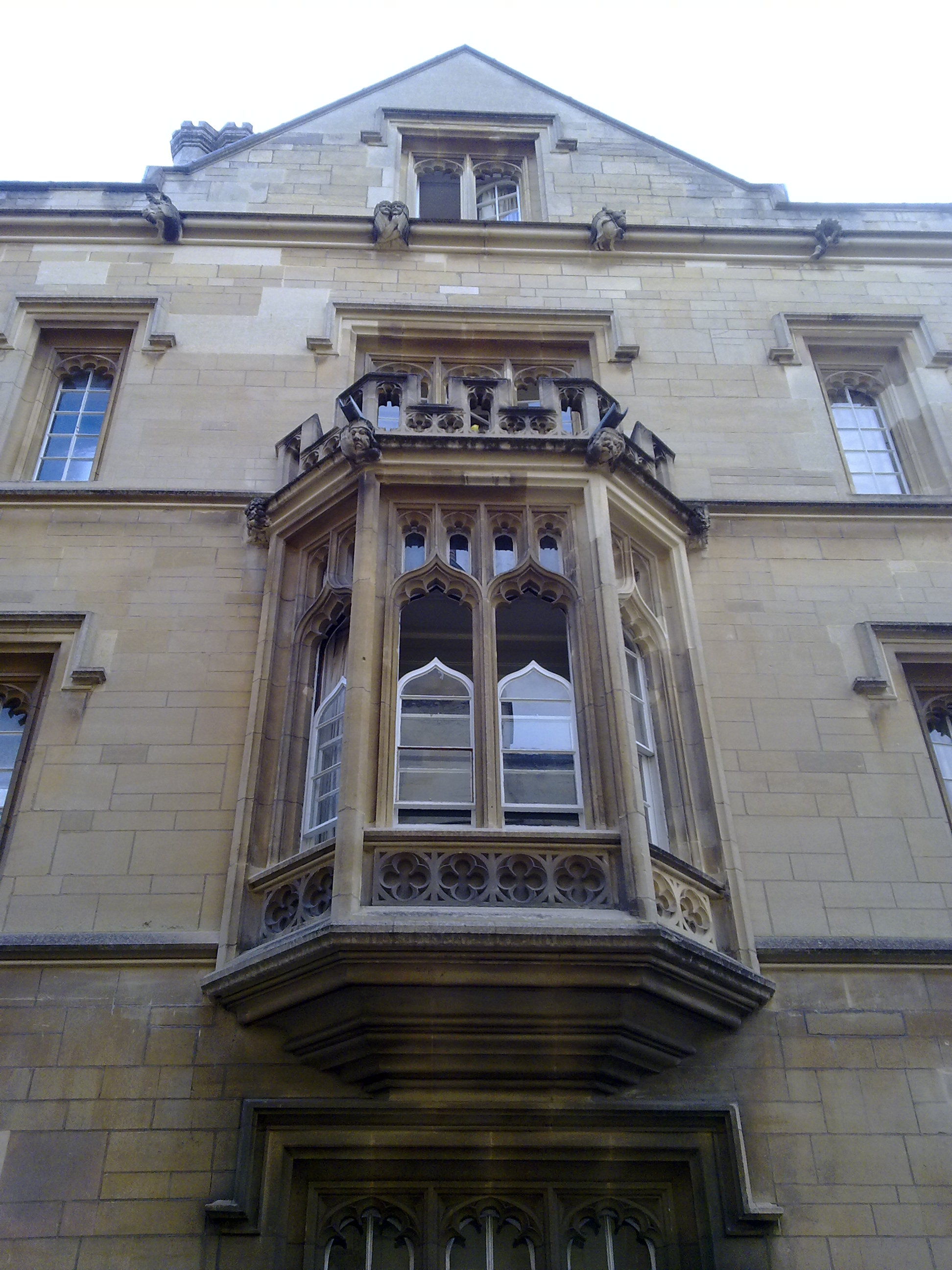
An oriel window in Turl Street belonging to Exeter College, Oxford

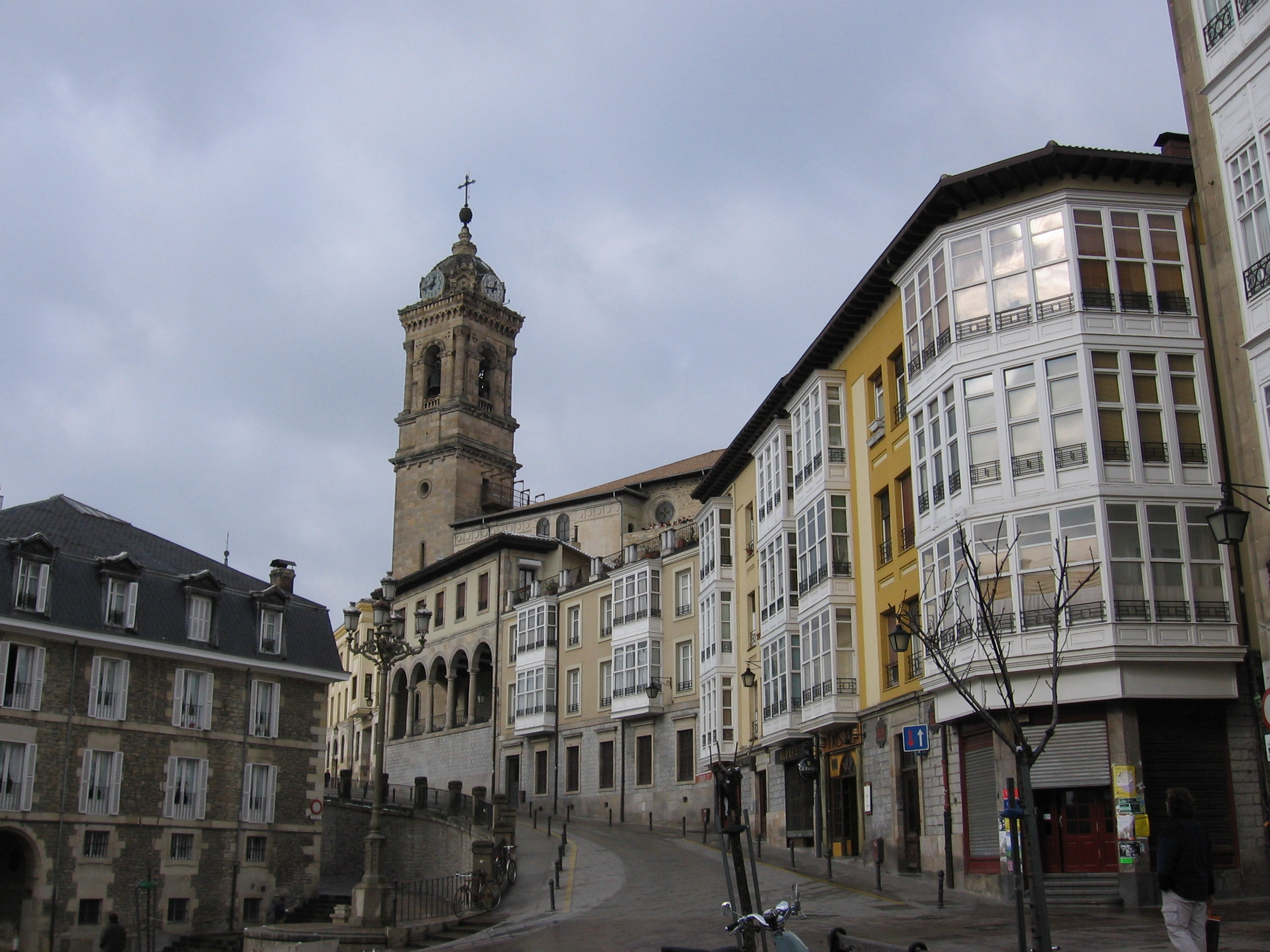
Vitoria-Gasteiz

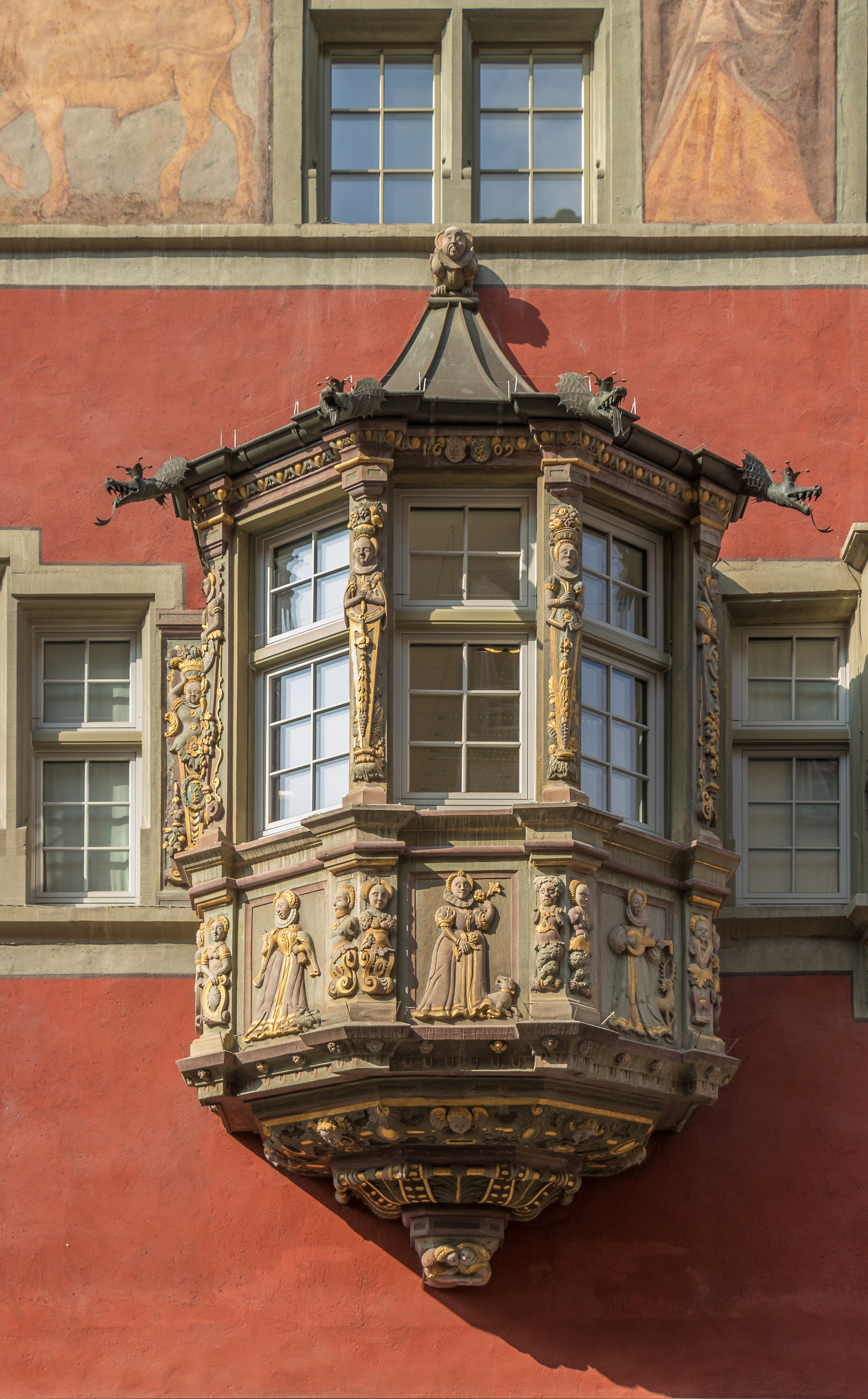
Zum Goldenen Ochsen oriel in Schaffhausen, Switzerland

== See also ==
- Bay window – Architectural element (for more details)
- Bow window – Curved bay window
- Bretèche – Type of castle architectural element
- Garderobe – Privy in medieval buildings
- Jharokha – Indian architectural element
- Mashrabiya – Islamic architectural element
- Sachnisi – Traditional type of bay window in Greece, the Balkans and the Middle East
- Turret – Small tower that projects vertically from a building's wall; often a fortification
