= Bay window =

Architectural element

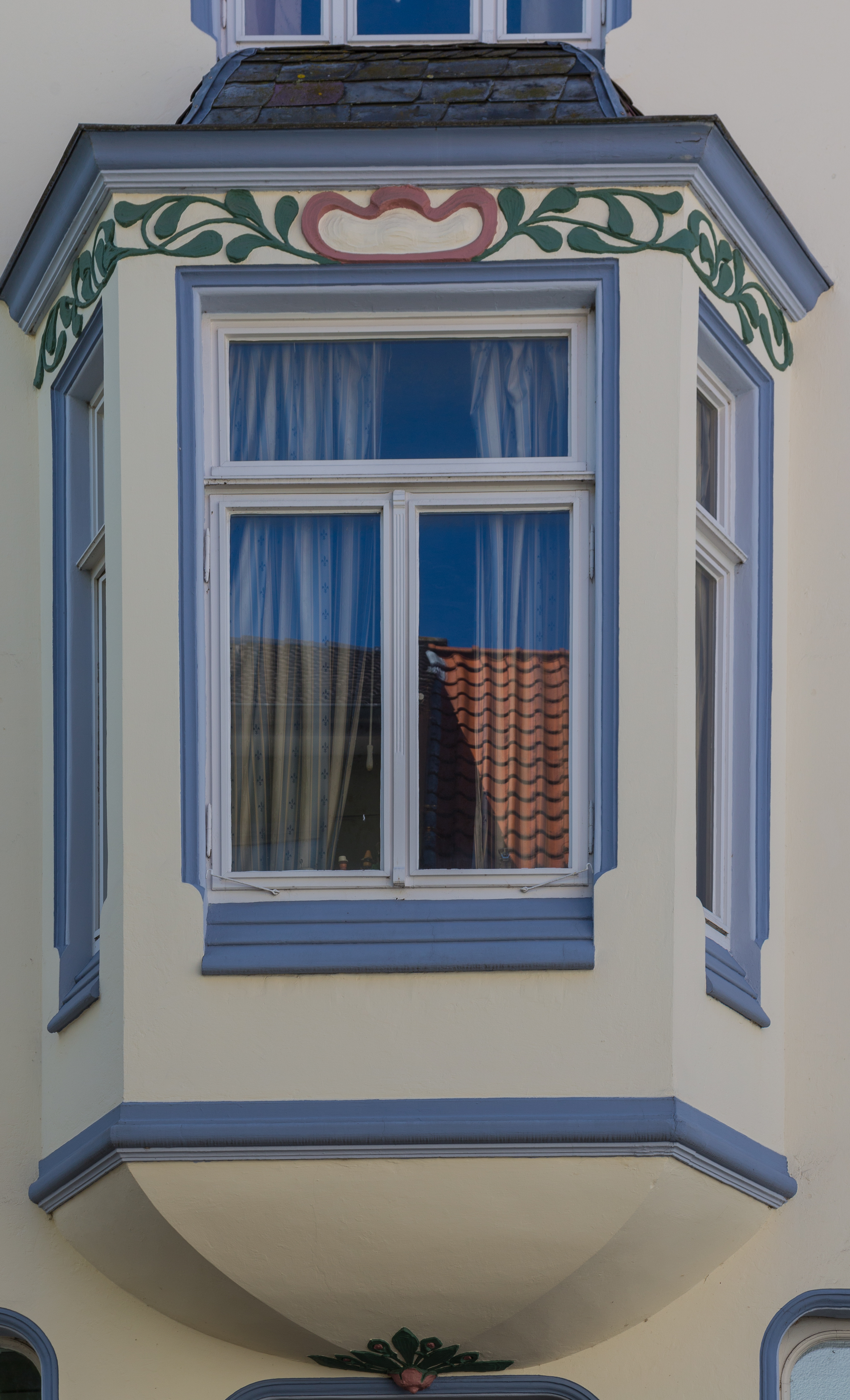
A canted oriel window in Lengerich, Germany

A bay window is a window space projecting outward from the main walls of a building and forming a bay in a room. A bow window is a form of bay with a curve rather than angular facets; an oriel window is a bay window that does not touch the ground.

A window may be all three: projecting outward from the main fascia of a wall, curved in shape, and not reaching the ground. A bay window may be supported from the ground by a foundation, or in space by corbels, brackets, or cantilever.

A typical bay window consists of a central windowpane, called a fixed sash, flanked by two or more smaller windows, known as casement or double-hung windows. The arrangement creates a panoramic view of the outside, allows more natural light to enter the room, and provides additional space within the room. Bay windows are often designed to extend beyond the exterior wall, either adding to floor space, often filled with a table, desk, or seating area, or turned into a window seat (often with storage or a grated radiator below). They are found both in residential buildings, particularly in living rooms, studies, dining areas, or bedrooms, and in commercial and public structures.

== Types ==
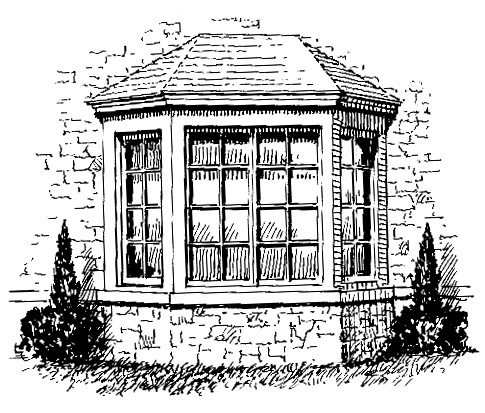
Typical residential canted bay window, supported by a foundation and rising from the ground

Bay window is a generic term for all protruding window constructions, regardless of whether they are curved like a bow window or angular, start from the ground, and run over one or multiple storeys.

In plan, the most frequently used shapes are isosceles trapezoid (which may be referred to as a canted bay window) and rectangle. But other polygonal shapes with more than three faces are also common, as are curved shapes. If a bay window is curved it may alternatively be called bow window. The angles most commonly used on the inside corners of the bay are 90, 135 and 150 degrees. Bay windows in a triangular shape with just one corner exist, but are relatively rare.

A bay window that does not reach the ground and is supported by a corbel, bracket, cantilever, or similar is called an oriel window.

== Uses ==
Bay windows can make a room appear larger, and provide views of the outside which would be unavailable with an ordinary flat window. They are found in terraced houses, semis, and detached houses as well as in blocks of flats.

In commercial structures bay windows allow an expanded footprint out into "public space", ideal for showroom windows; in multi-story commercial structures, particularly early skyscrapers, they increased a building's space without adding to its taxable footprint or expanding from the ground up into public space.

Based on British models, their use spread to other English-speaking countries like Ireland, the US, Canada, and Australia. Following the pioneering model of pre-modern commercial architecture at the Oriel Chambers in Liverpool, they feature on early Chicago School skyscrapers, where they often run the whole height of the building's upper storeys. They also feature in bay-and-gable houses commonly found in older portions of Toronto.

Particularly during the Gothic period bay windows often served as small house chapels, containing an altar and resembling an apse of a church. Especially in Nuremberg these are even called Chörlein (lit. 'little apse/choir'), with the most famous example being the one from the parsonage of St. Sebaldus Church.

In medieval times and up to the Baroque era most bay windows were oriels, and frequently appear as a highly ornamented addition to the building rather than an organic part of it.

In Islamic architecture, oriel windows such as the Arabic mashrabiya are frequently made of wood and in warm climates serve the general function of an enclosed balcony, providing greater privacy and relief from the sun.

Bay windows were identified as a defining characteristic of San Francisco architecture in a 2012 study that had a machine learning algorithm examine a random sample of 25,000 photos of cities from Google Street View.

== Gallery ==
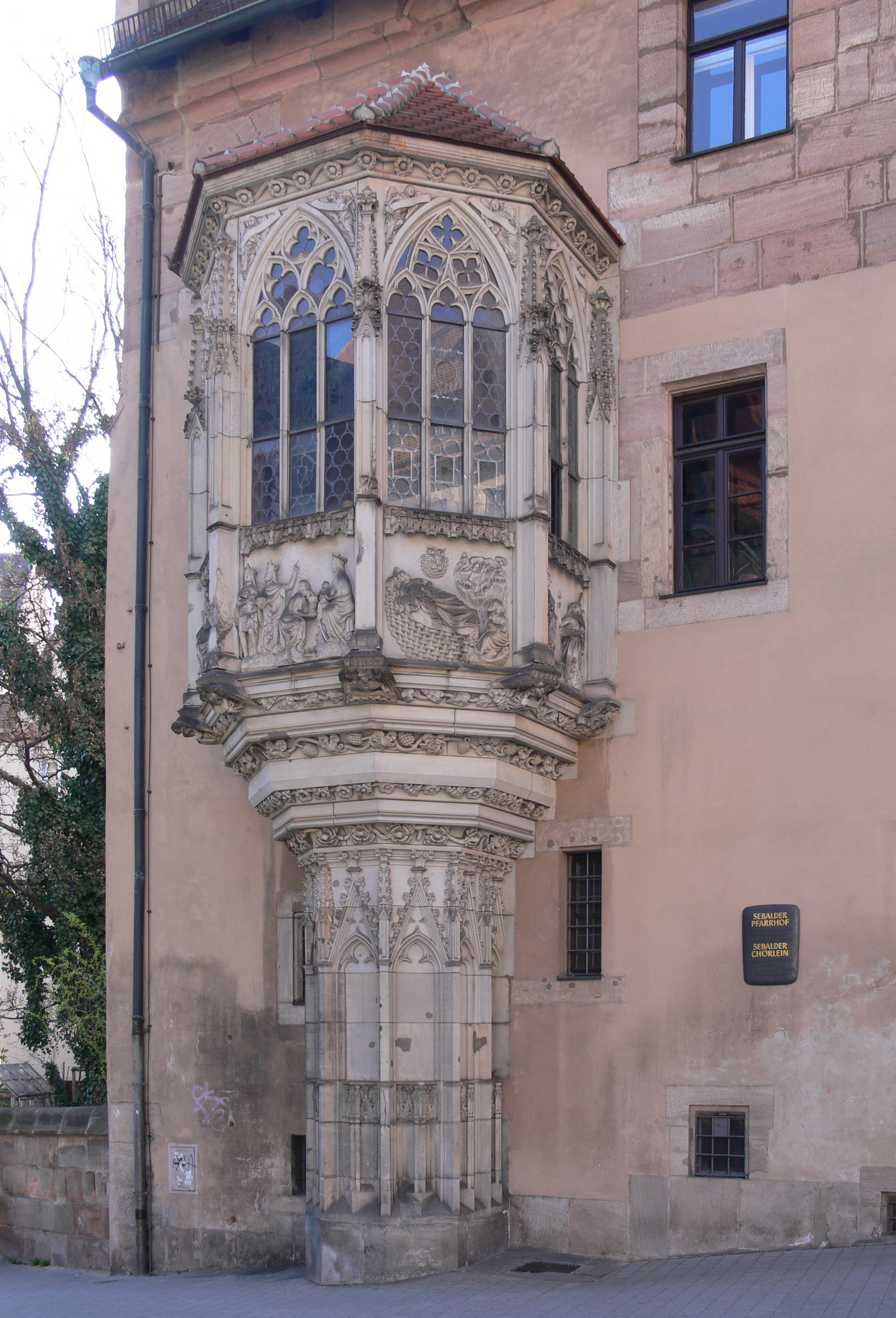
Chörlein at the parsonage of St. Sebaldus Church, Nuremberg, before 1361

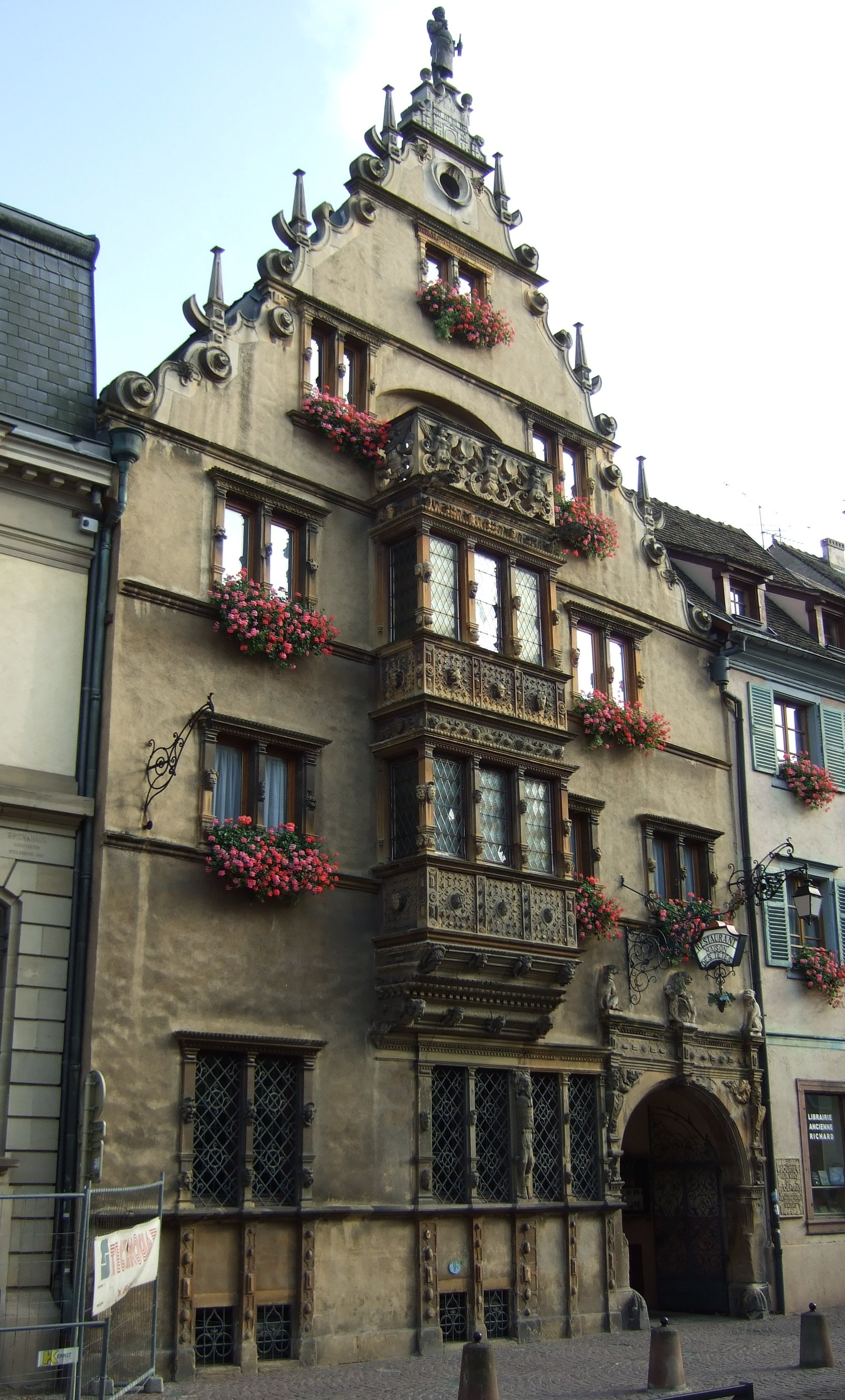
Two superposed Renaissance oriel windows in Colmar, France

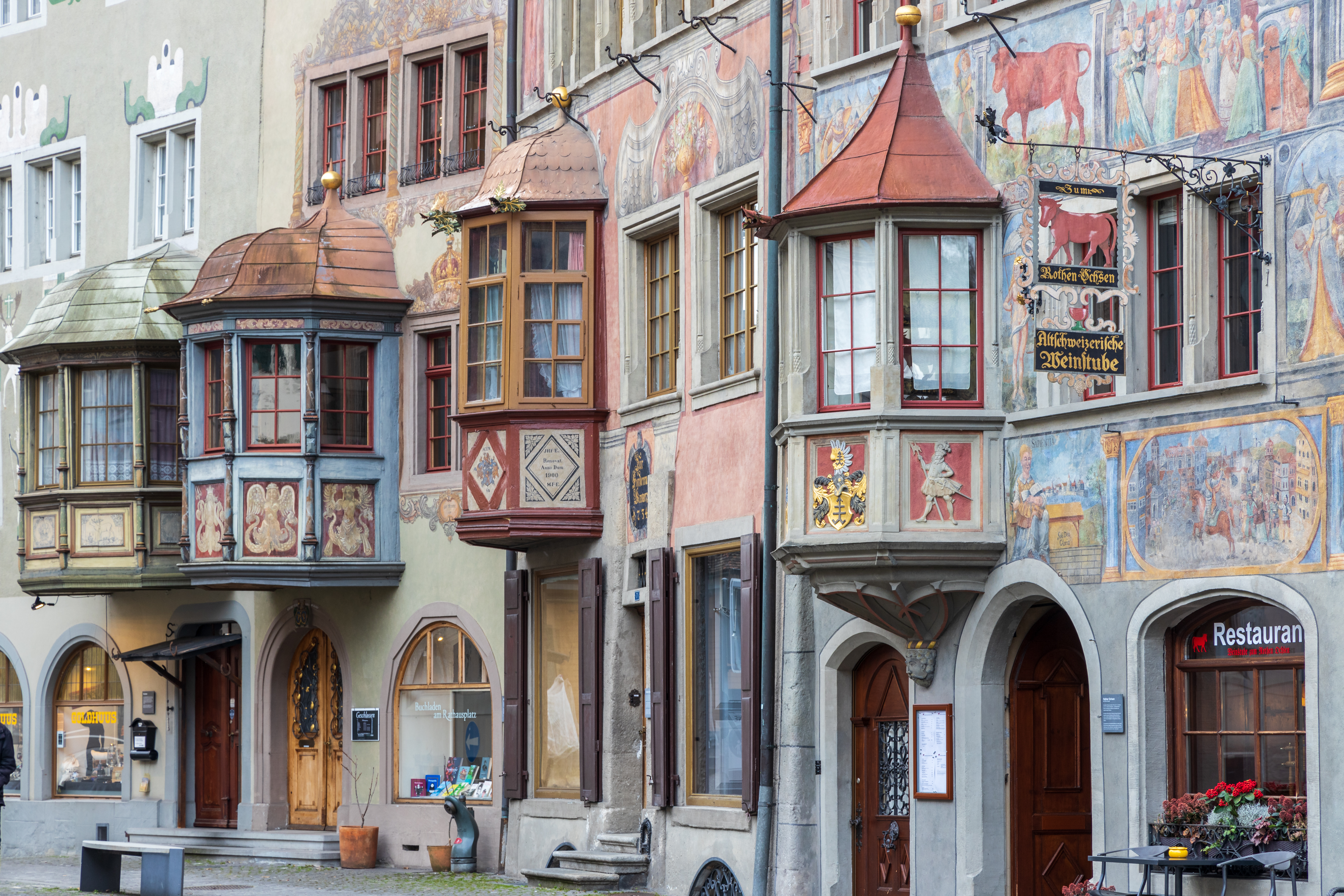
Market square in Stein am Rhein, Switzerland

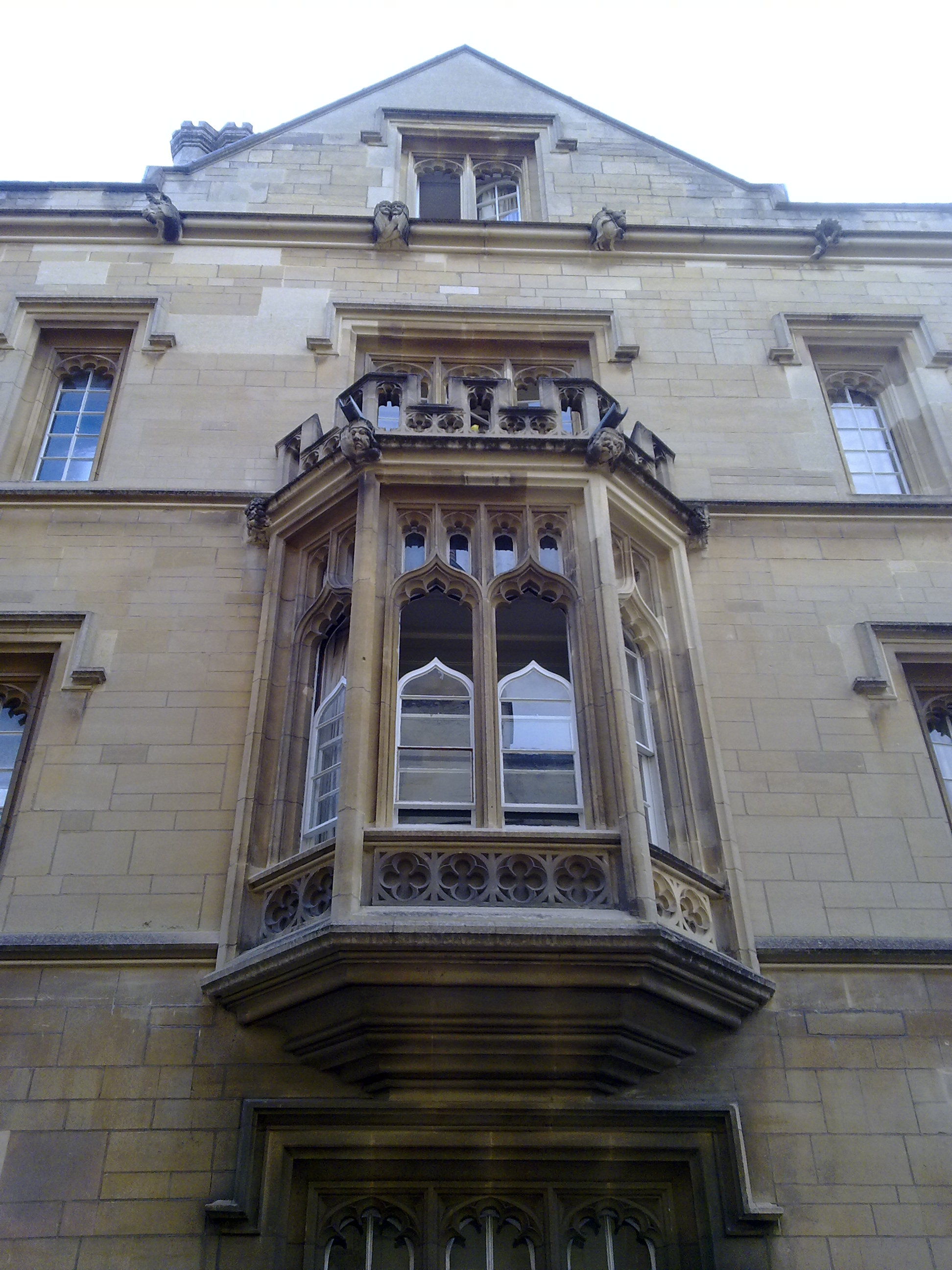
An oriel window in Turl Street belonging to Exeter College, Oxford

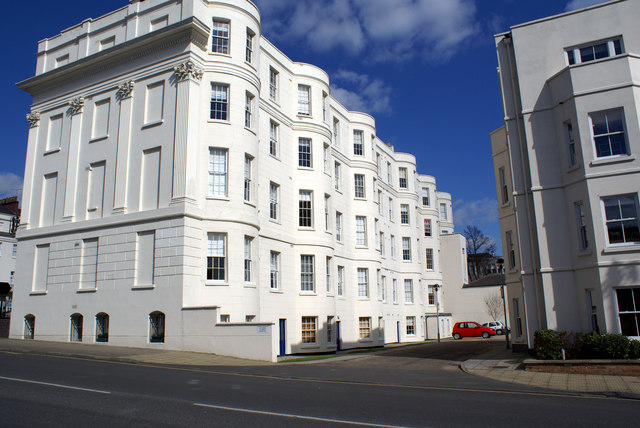
Rear of the Clarence Mansions, a grade II* listed luxurious 19th-century Regency apartment block in Leamington Spa, Warwickshire, England

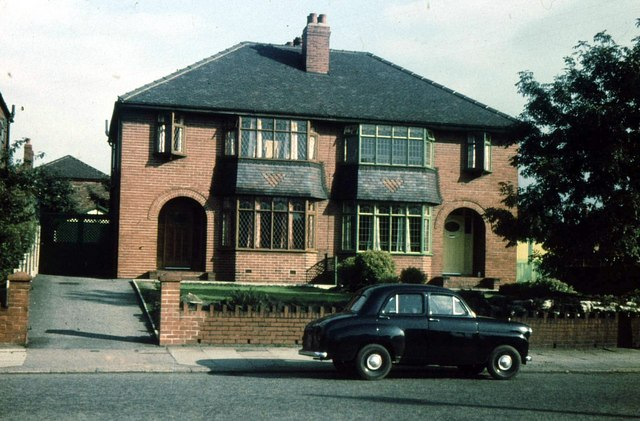
Typical 1930s bay-fronted semis in Chadderton, Greater Manchester

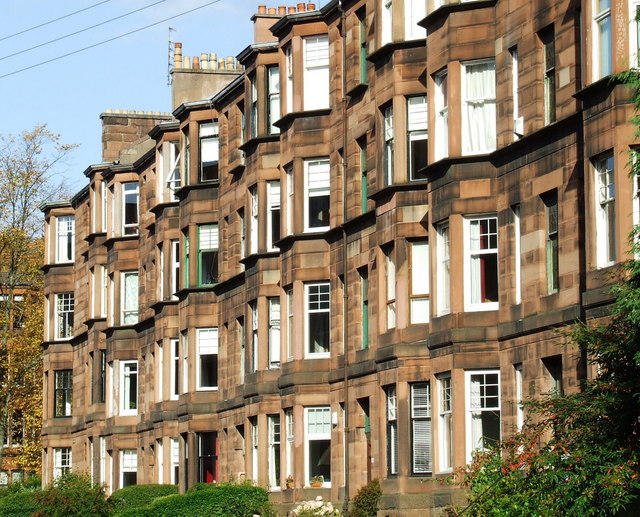
Flats in Hyndland, Glasgow, late 19th or early 20th century

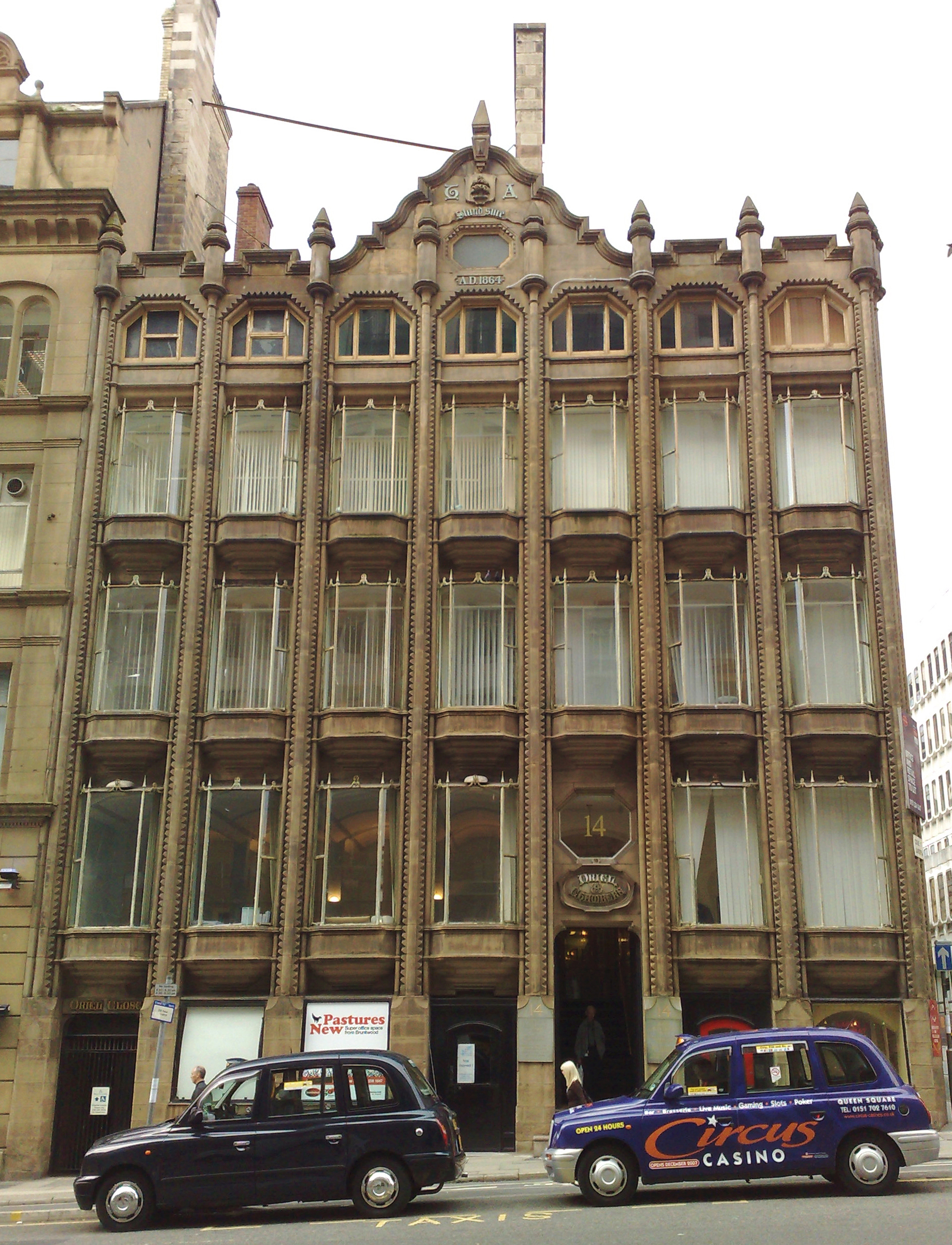
Oriel Chambers, Liverpool, by Peter Ellis, 1864

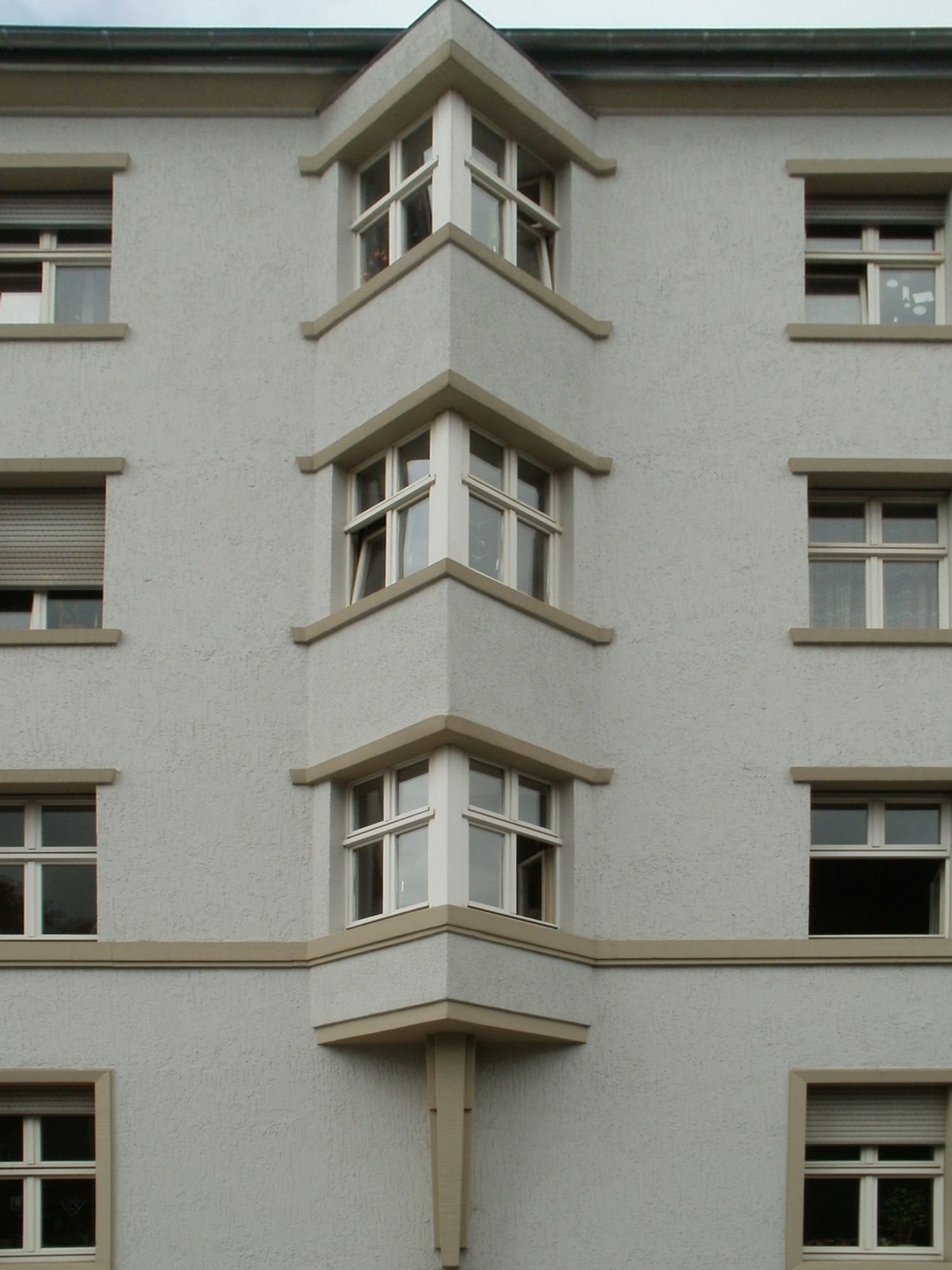
Triangular oriel windows in Hellwigstrasse, Saarbrücken, Germany, 1927

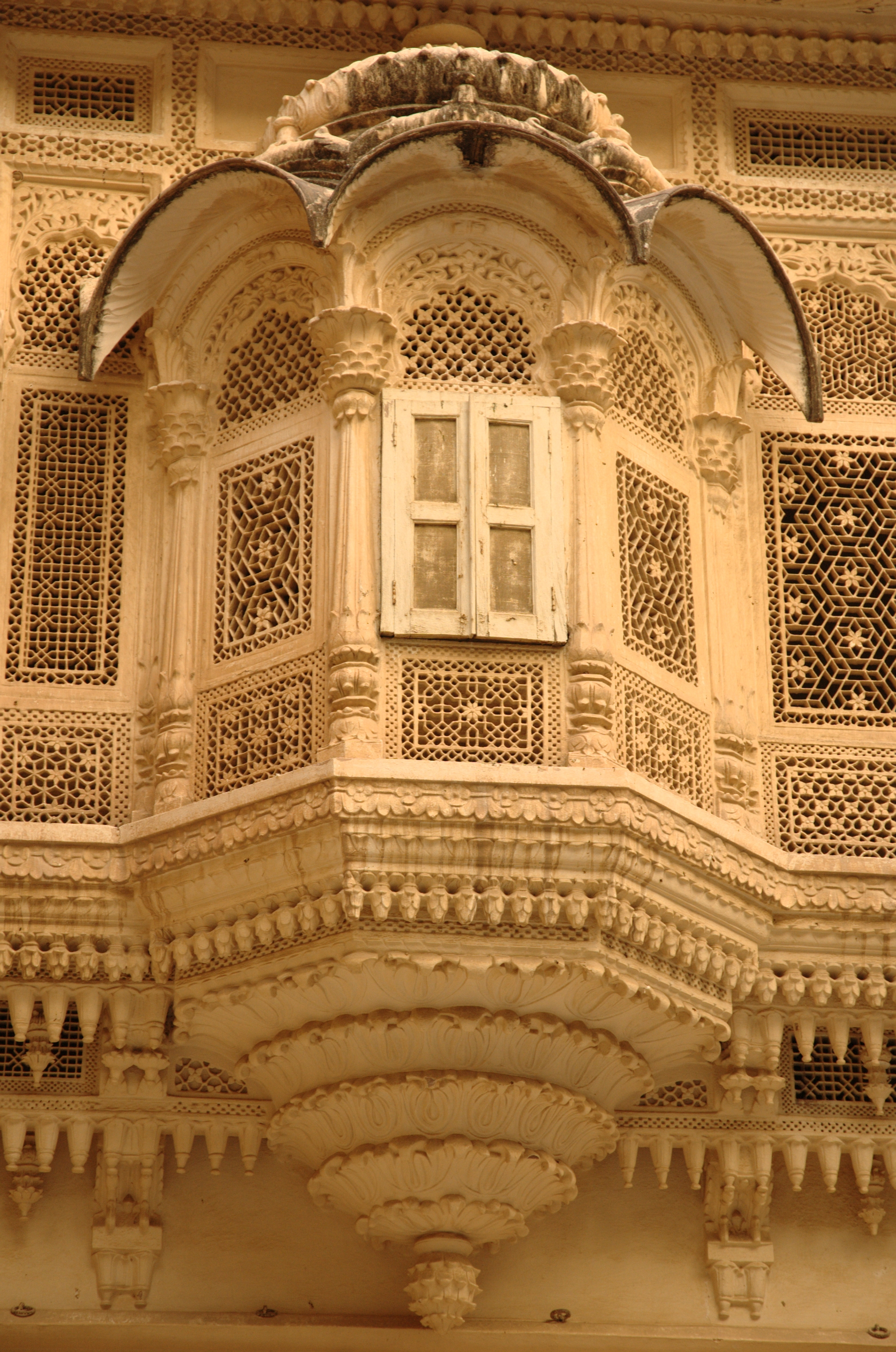
Mehrangarh Fort, India

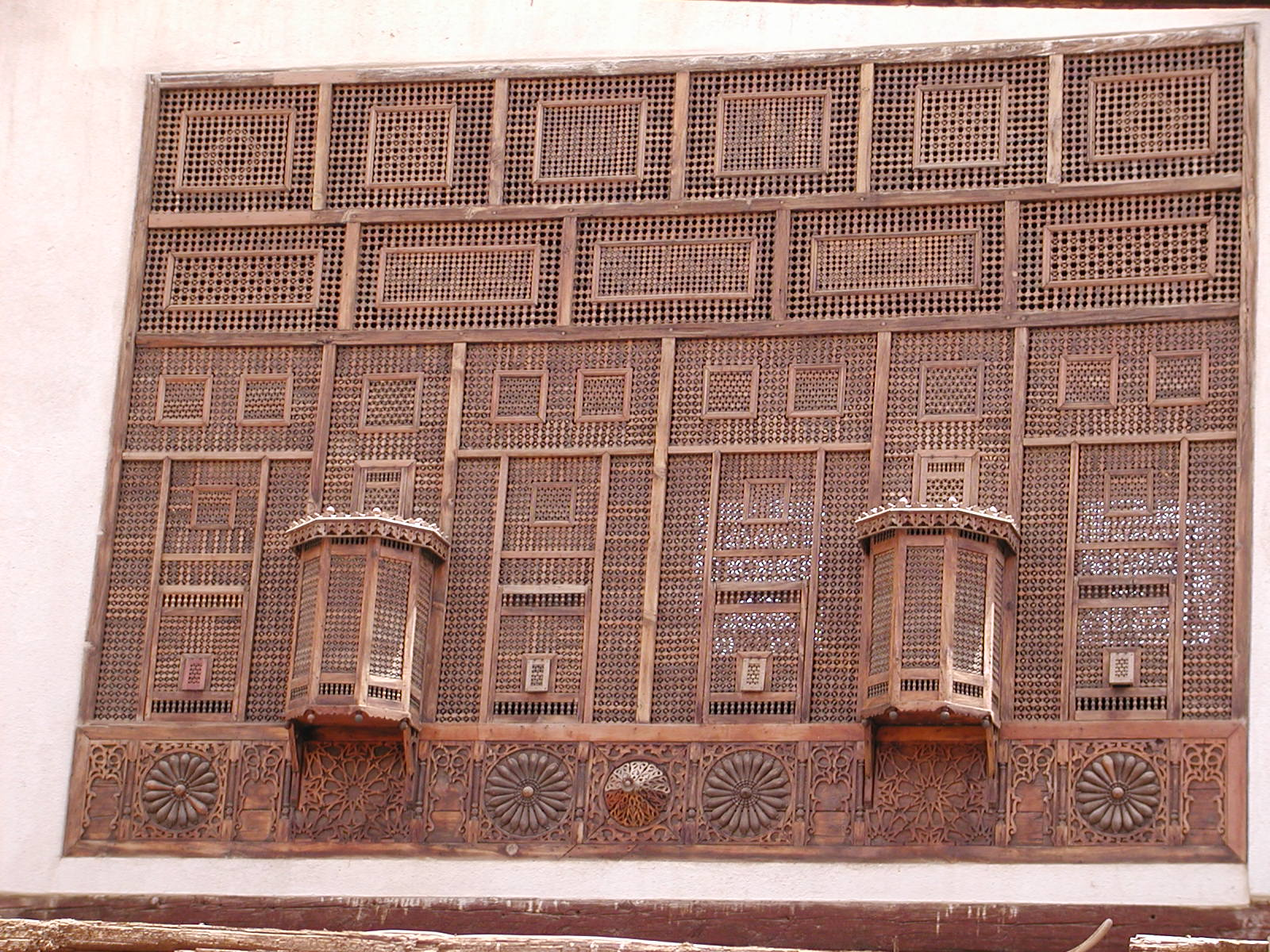
Mashrabiya, Bayt Al-Suhaymi, Cairo, Egypt

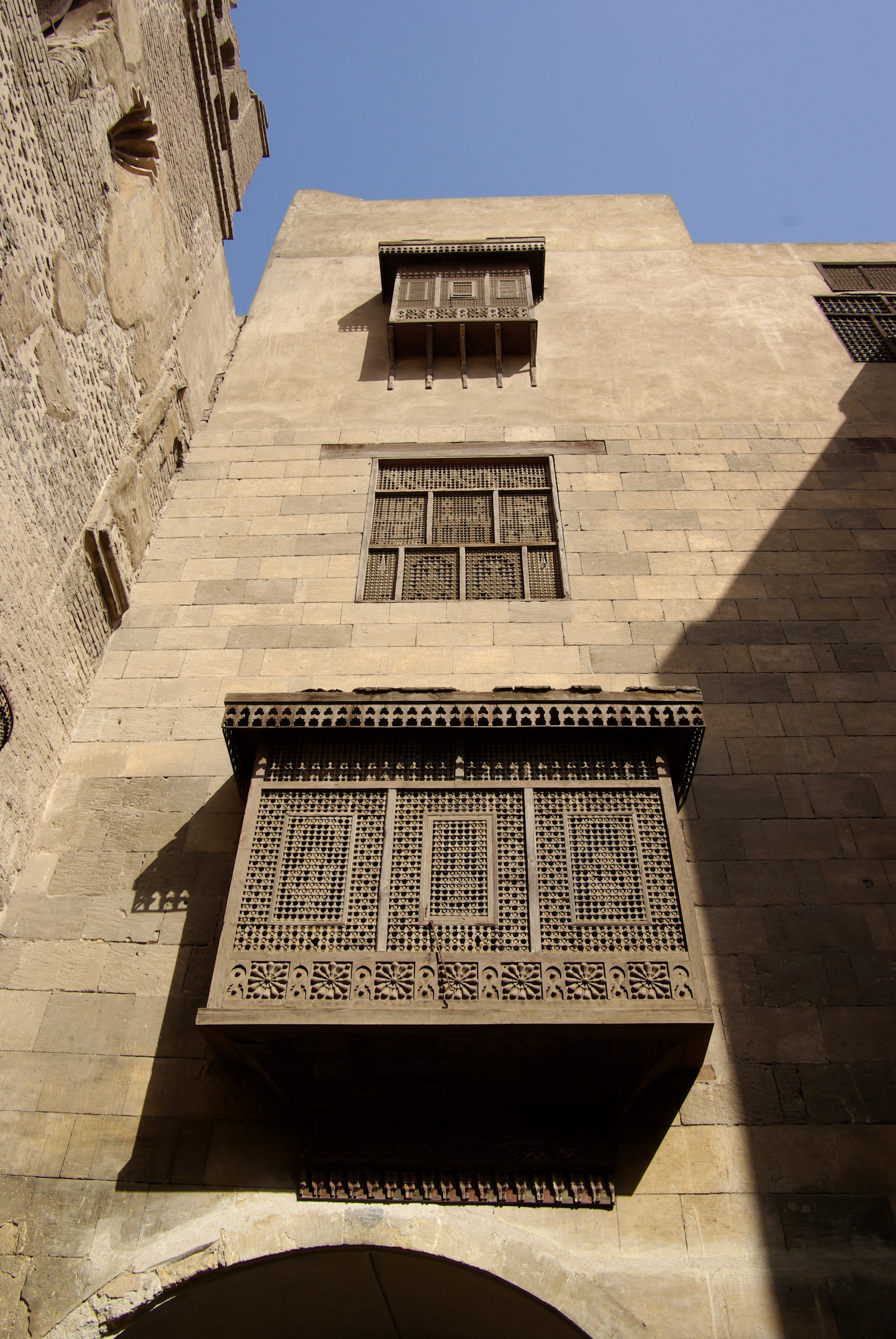
Gayer-Anderson Museum, Cairo, Egypt

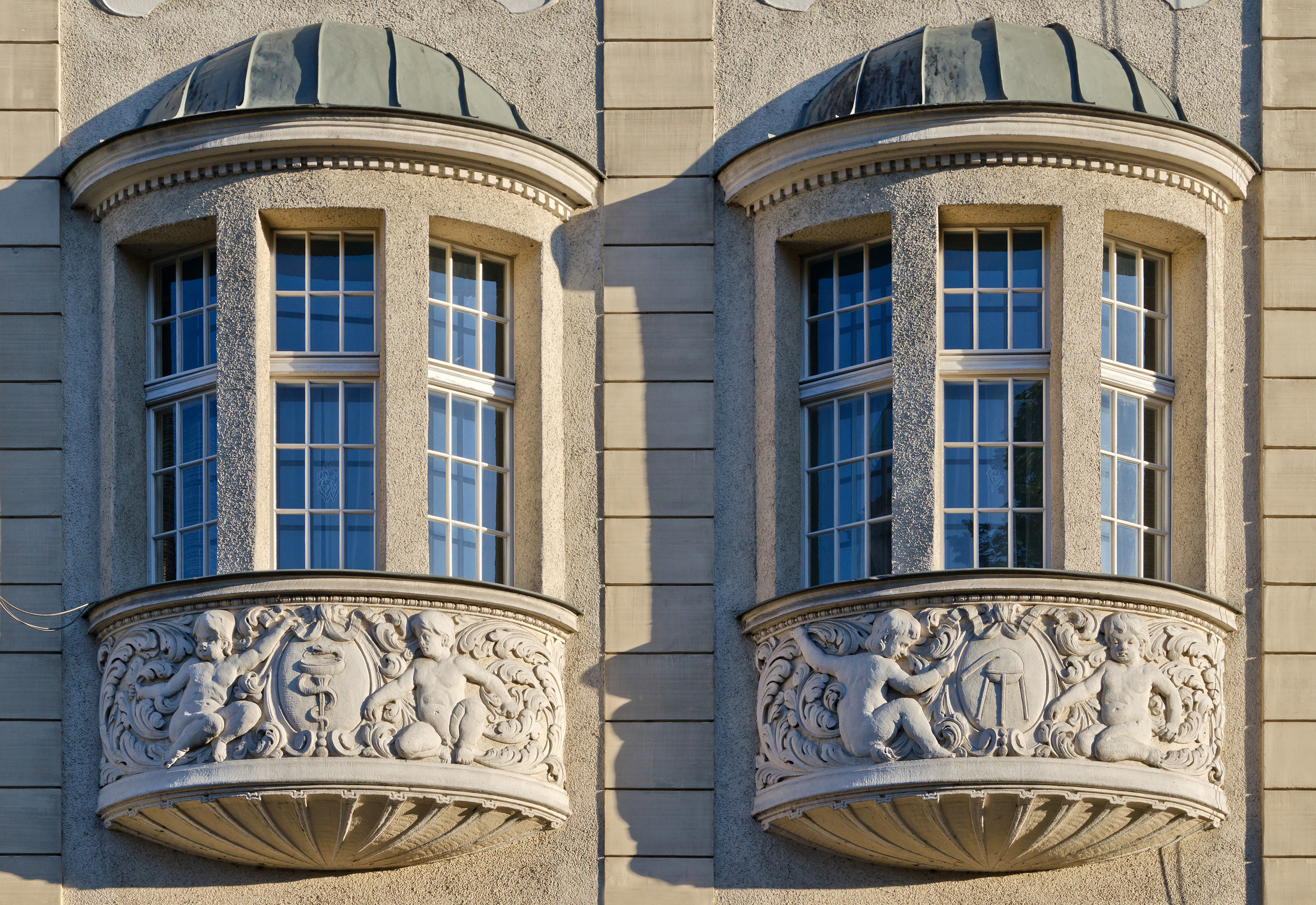
Kłodzko, Poland

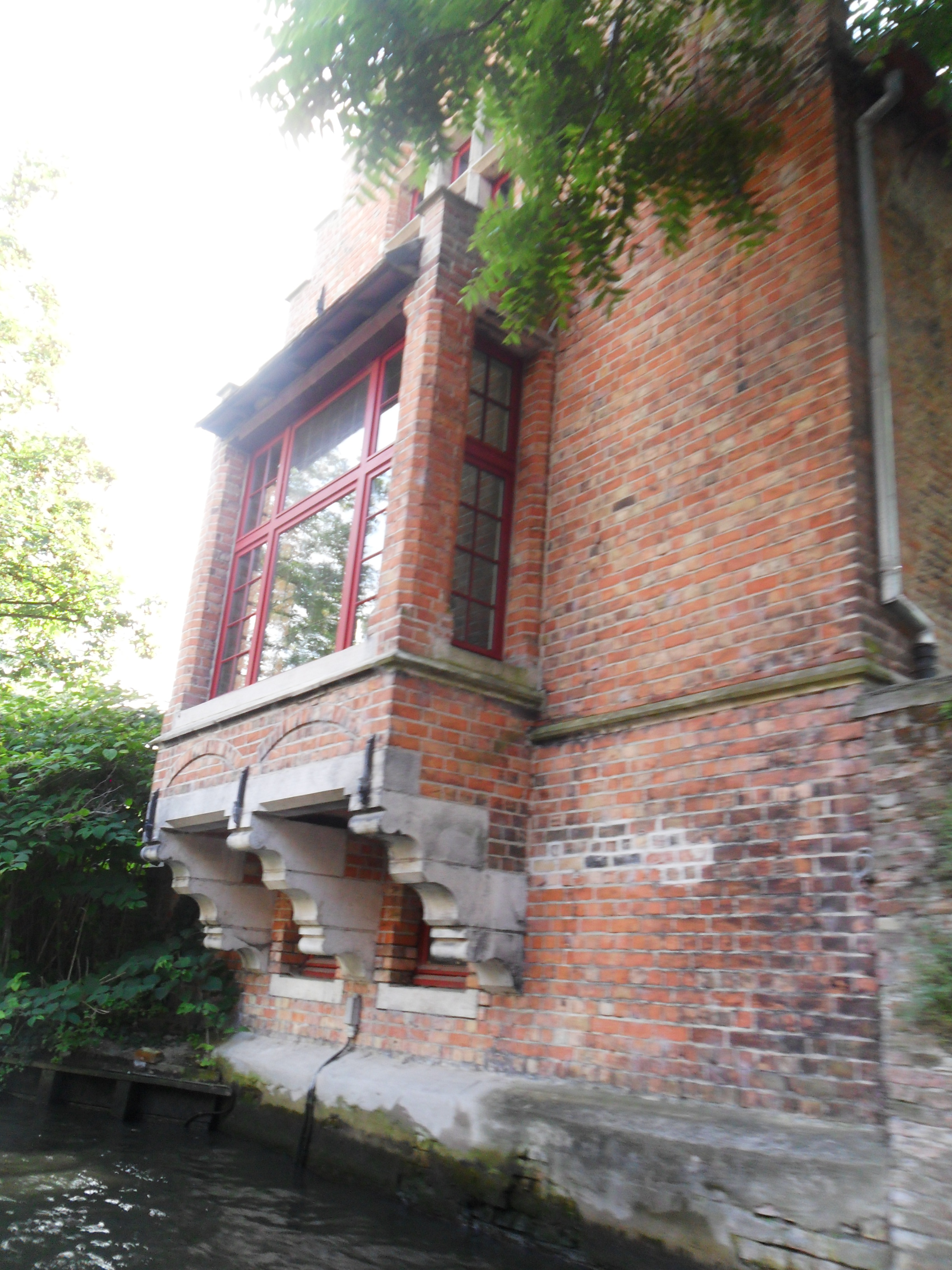
Bruges, Belgium

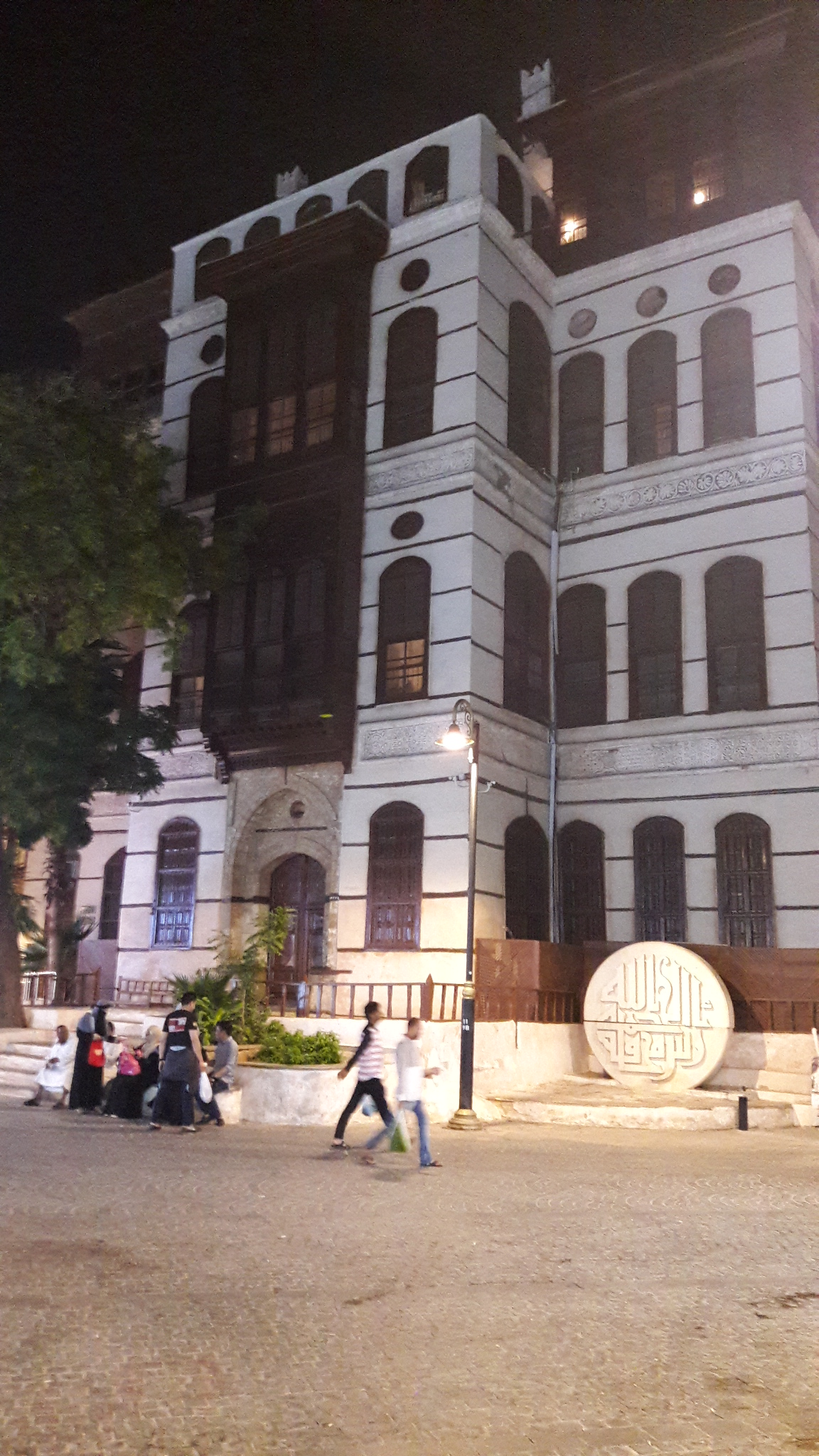
Traditional "rawashin" bay windows on Nasseef House in Jeddah, Saudi Arabia

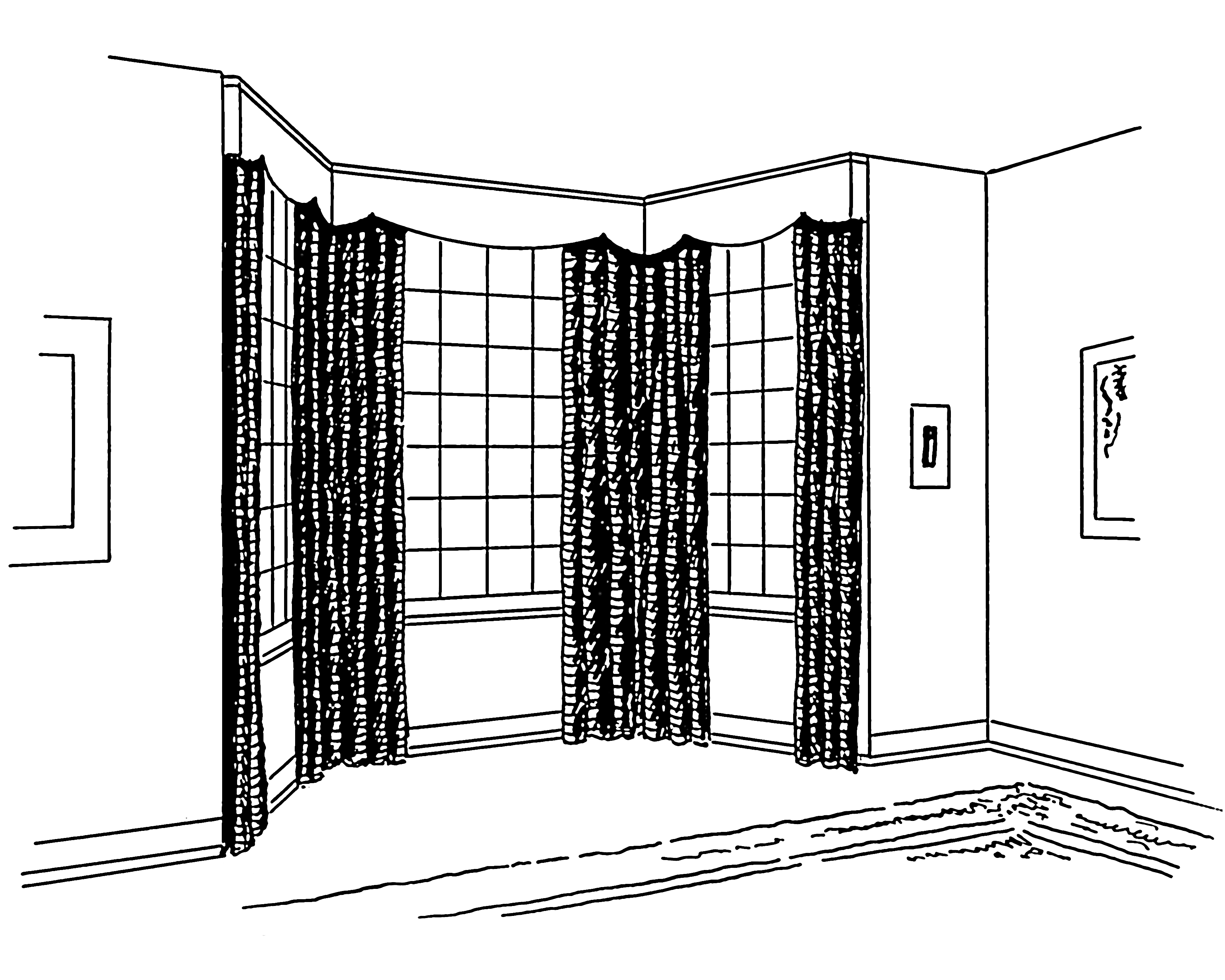
Typical interior of a full-height single-story residential bay window

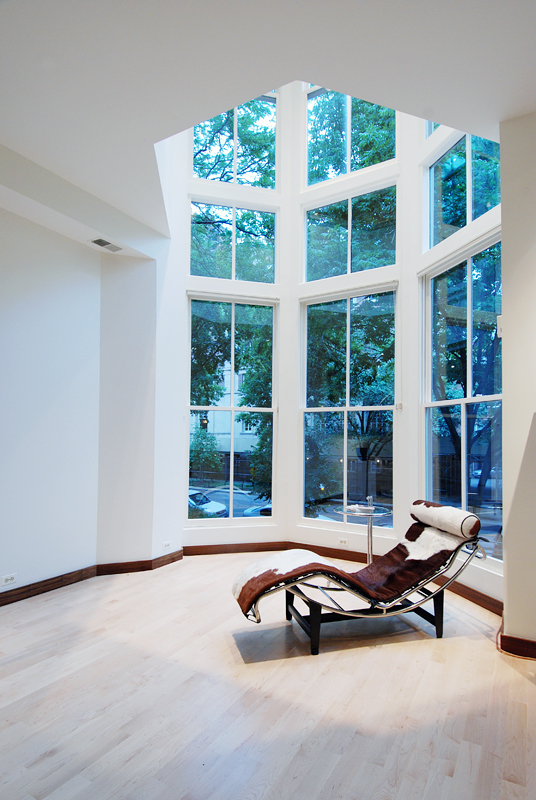
Interior of a multi-story bay window in Chicago, Illinois

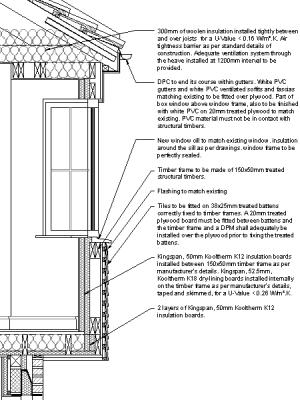
Bay window section drawing

== See also ==
- Caboose bay window
- Avant-corps – Protruding part of a building
- Bow window – Curved bay window
- Bretèche – Type of castle architectural element
- Garderobe – Privy in medieval buildings
- Jharokha – Indian architectural element
- Oriel window – Type of bay window
- Sachnisi – Traditional type of bay window in Greece, the Balkans and the Middle East
