= Sachnisi =

Traditional type of bay window in Greece, the Balkans and the Middle East

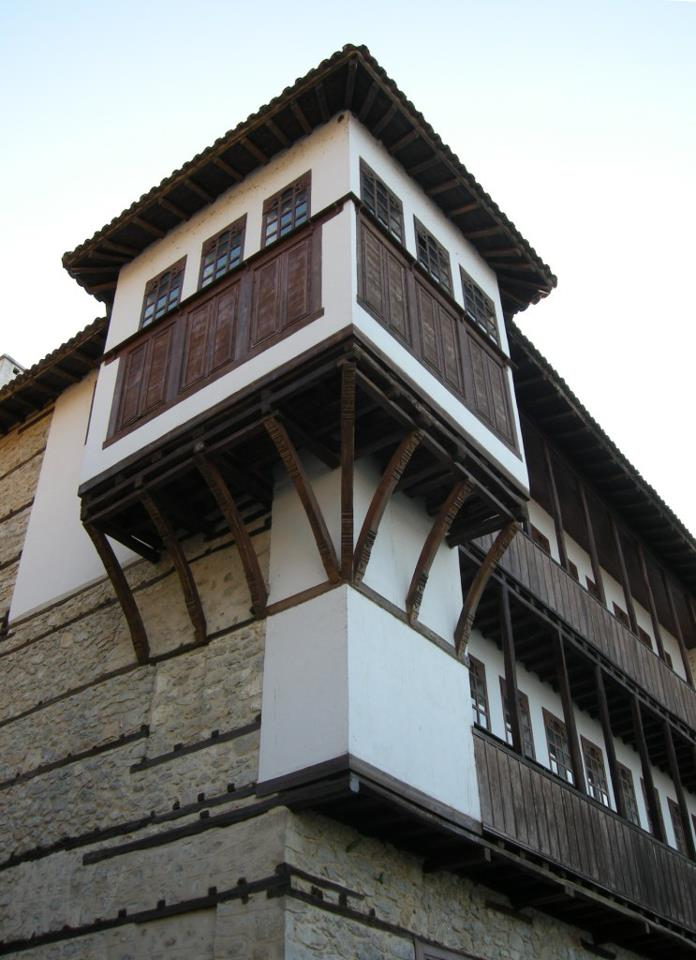
A sachnisi in Kastoria, Greece.

The sachnisi (Greek: σαχνισί, from the Turkish word şahniş) is a traditional type of bay window found in Northern Greece, the Balkans and the Middle East.
