= Rushan =

Rushan may refer to:

- Rushan, Shandong, a county-level city of Weihai, Shandong, China
- Ruşan, also known as Rushan, a village and municipality in the Ismailli Rayon of Azerbaijan
- Rushan Range, a mountain range in south-western Pamir in Tajikistan
- Rushan cheese, cow's milk cheese of Yunnan, China
- Rushan (name)
- Rūshān, mashrabiya, a type of projecting window characteristic of traditional architecture in the Islamic world
- Rushan people, a Iranic-Pamiri ethno-linguistic group of people

== See also ==
- Rushon District, Gorno-Badakhshan Autonomous Province, Tajikistan
  - Rushon or Rushan, the capital town of the district
