= Rusan =

Rusan may refer to:

- Rusan, Albania, village in southern Albania in the Delvinë District
- Ruşan, village and municipality in the Ismailli Rayon of Azerbaijan
- Ferdo Rusan (1810 - 1879), Croatian reformer, composer and musician
- Timothy Rusan (born 1977), American triple jumper
