= Al-Mashrabiya Building =

Building in Jerusalem built on contemporary Arab architecture

al-Mashrabiya Building
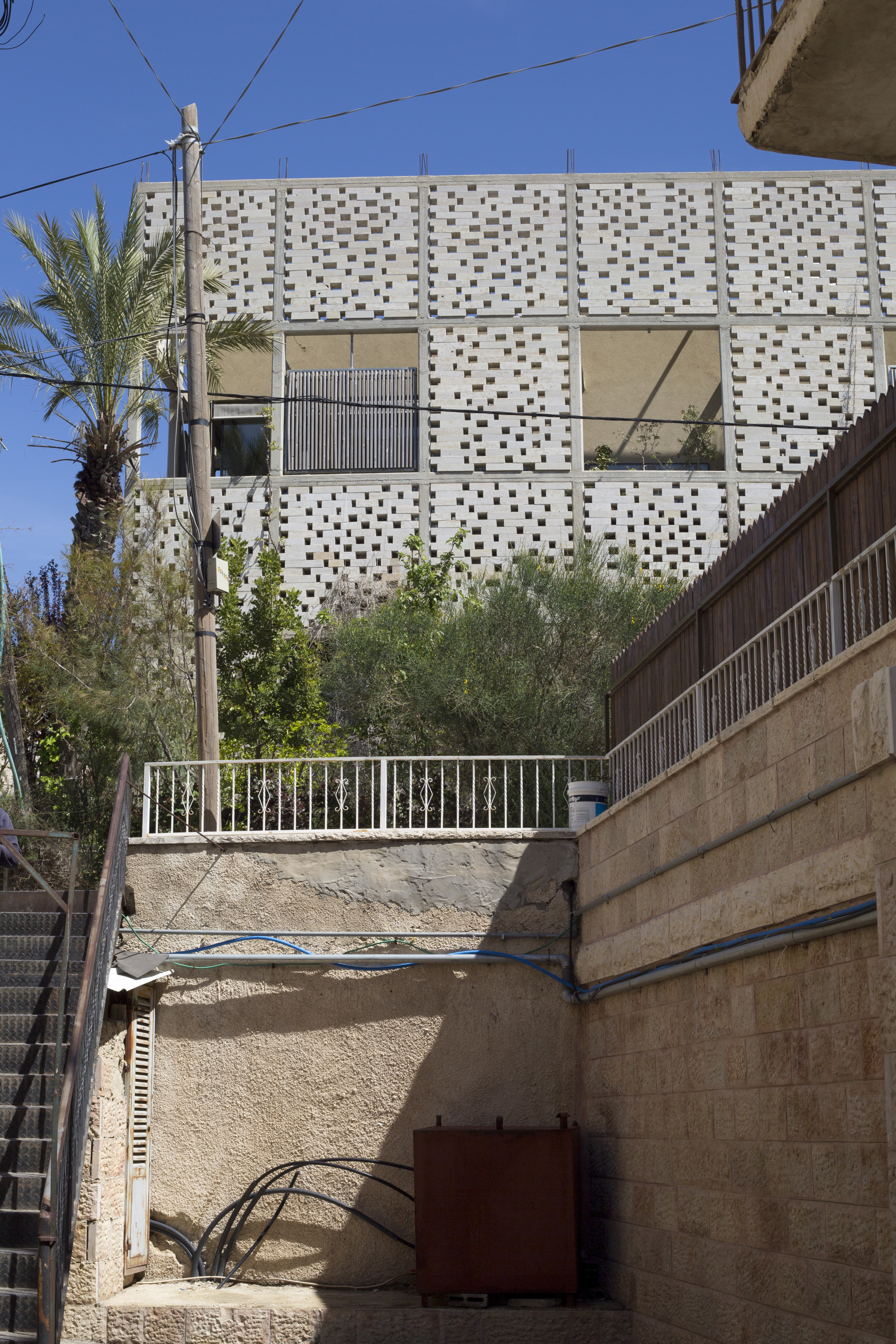
- al-Mashrabiya Building in Jerusalem

General information
- Architectural style: Arab vernacular
- Location: Beit Safafa, Jerusalem
- Opened: 2011

Design and construction
- Architect: Senan Abdelqader

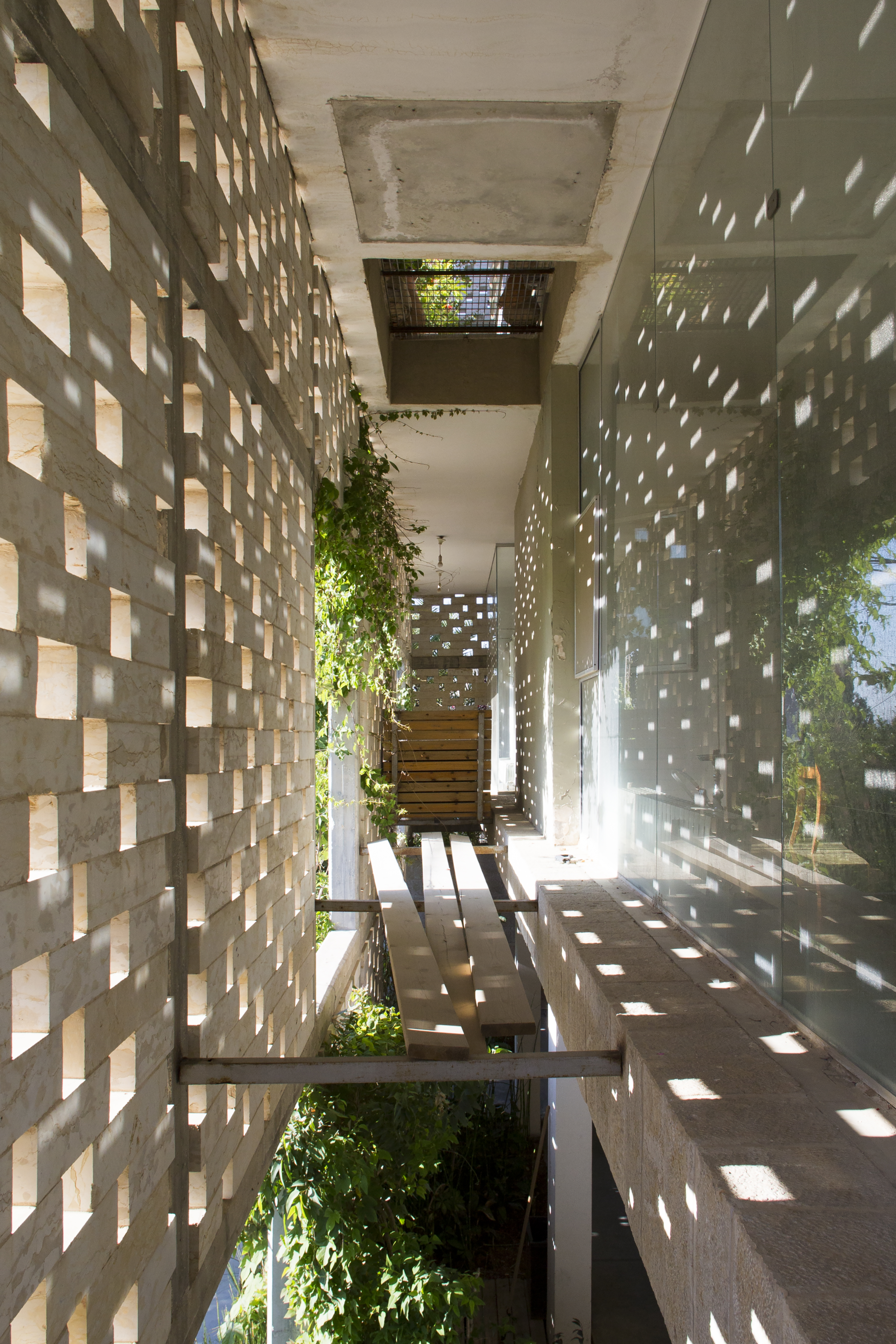
In between the Mashrabiyas

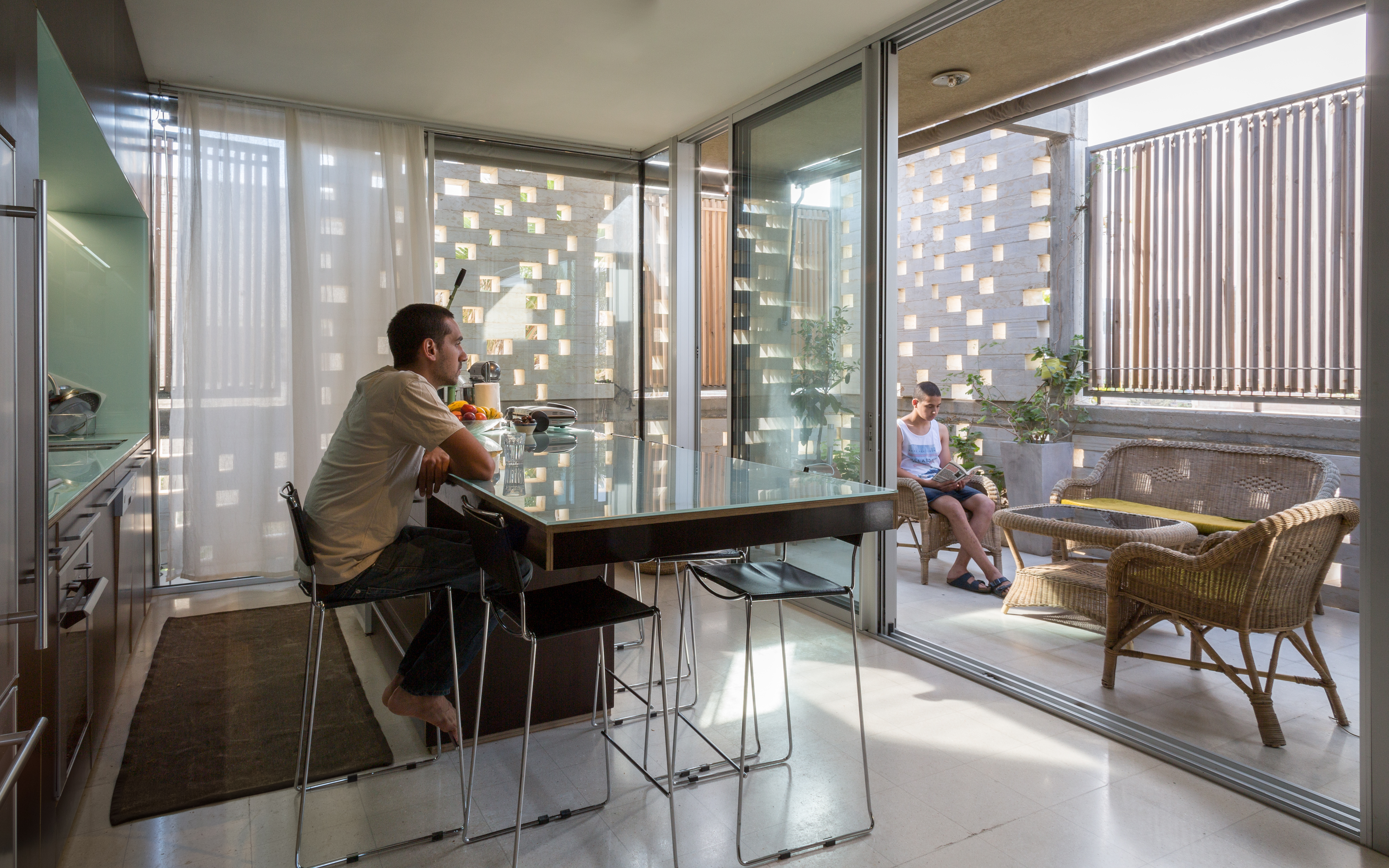
Inside al-Mashrabiya Building

Al-Mashrabiya Building is a building designed by Palestinian architect Senan Abdelqader in the Beit Safafa neighborhood of Jerusalem. It is a contemporary reinterpretation of traditional elements of Arab vernacular architecture.

== See also ==
- Mashrabiya
- Architecture of Palestine
- Architecture in Israel
