= Muxrabija =

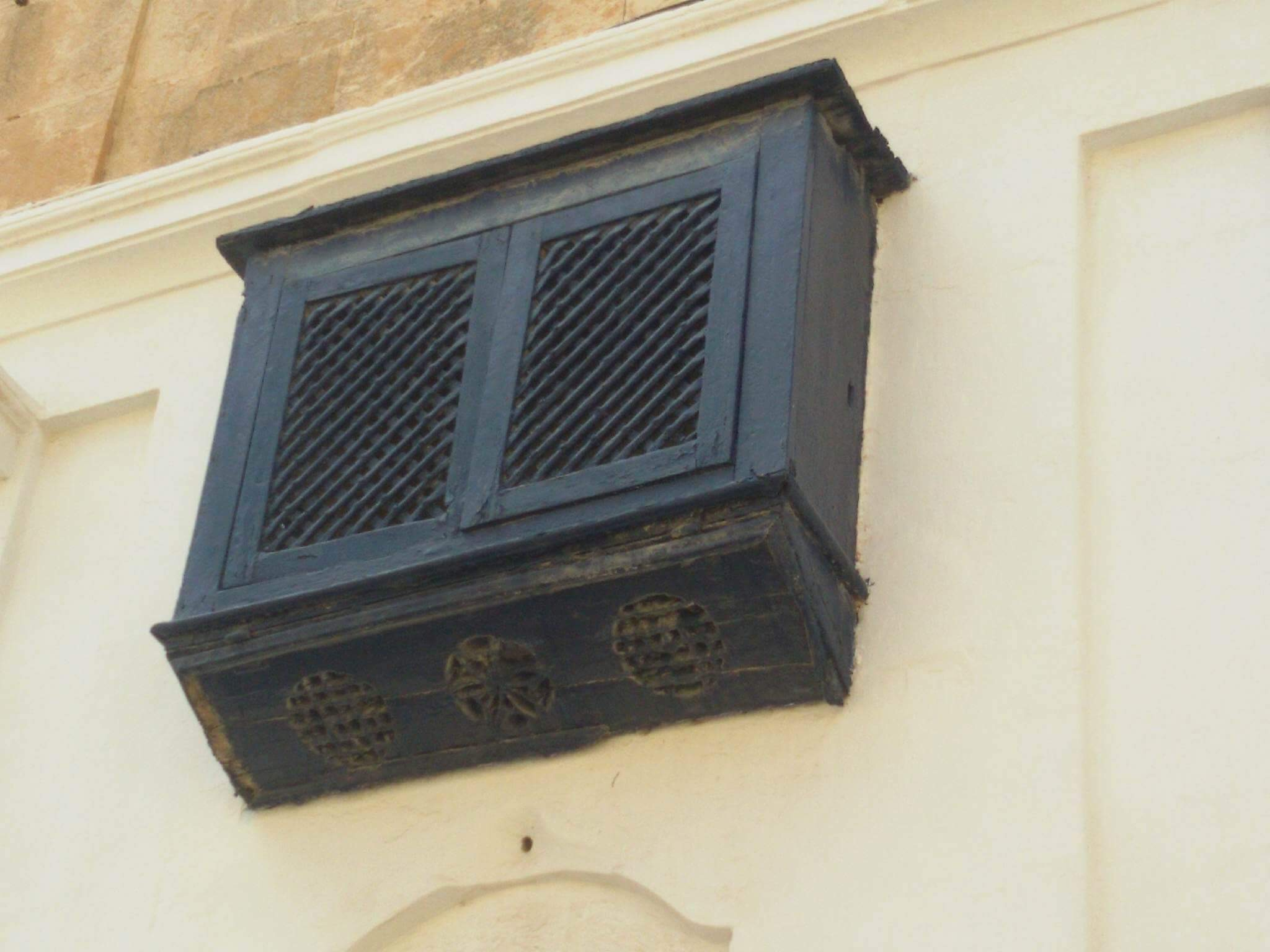
Wooden muxrabija in Qrendi

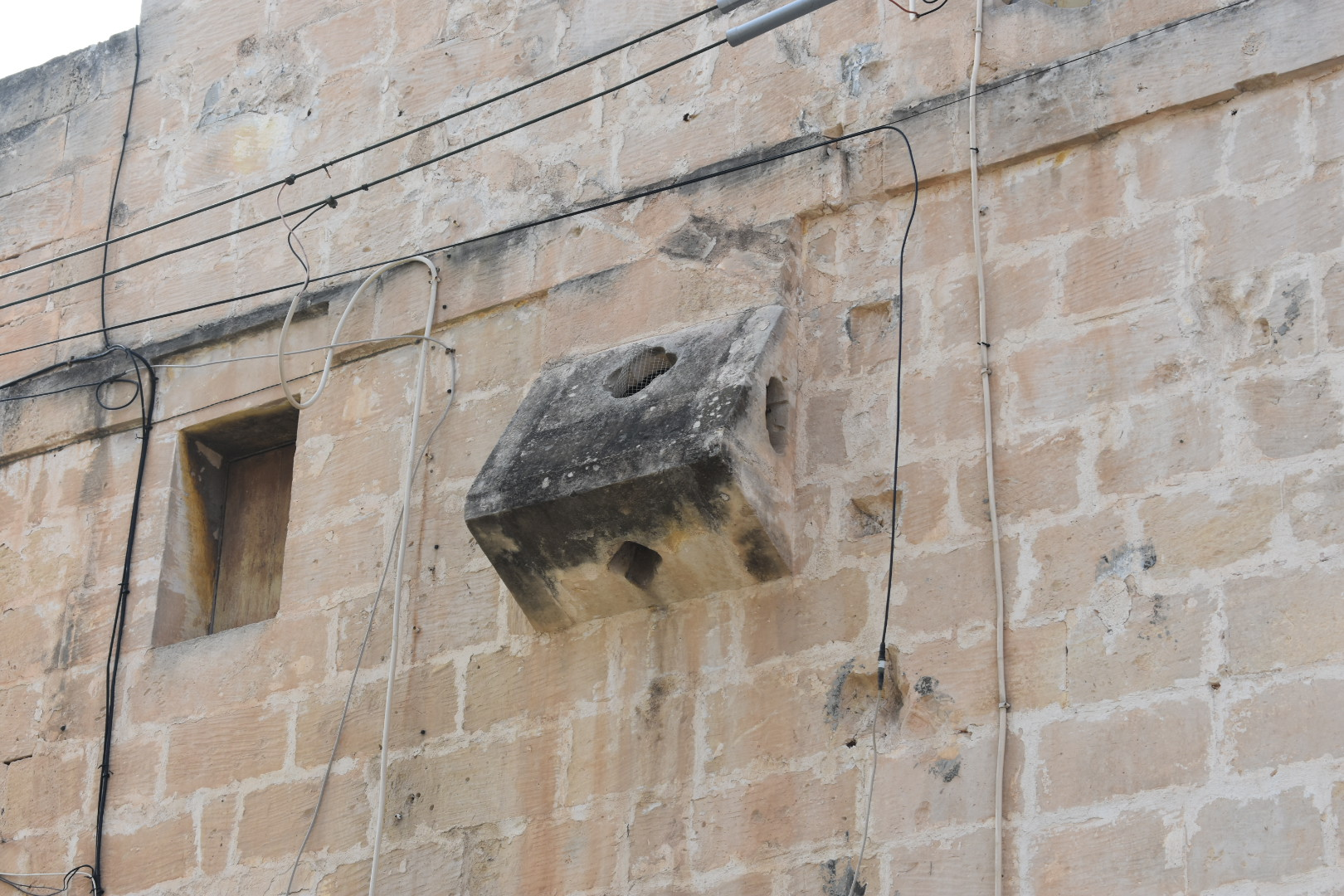
Stone-carved muxrabija in Zabbar

The Muxrabija (from the Arabic mashrabiya; plural muxrabijet) is a typical element of vernacular Maltese architecture. It consists of an ornate timber screen, perforated with an intricate network of holes, tightly fitted into a window or loggia projecting from the facade of the building, usually over the main door or to its side. Stone-carved muxrabijiet are also reported.

The muxrabija is also known as ‘in-nemmiesa’.النماسة, ‘ix-xerriefa’ الشرافةand in Gozo as ‘il-kixxiefa الكشافة or il-kixxiefija الكشافية and ‘il-glusija الگلوصية’ (probably from the French jalousie).

Muxrabijet and roundels (round motifs sculpted on building facades) are the only two features of vernacular Maltese architecture directly deriving from Arabic culture. The muxrabija is a typical Mediterranean feature, whose oldest record dates back to the 7th century in the Middle East. The oldest-surviving muxrabijet in Malta date back to the years 1300–1400.

Muxrabijet served to keep the interior of a building cool by allowing circulation of air through the carved wood. They were also used as cooling device for storing water, and as a security measure to observe the outside without being seen.

== List of muxrabijet in Malta ==
- Tal-Karmnu Street, Victoria, Gozo
- Sqaq il-Qajjied, Siggiewi
- 84, Santu Rokku Street, Birkirkara - House of Censu Borg (Brared), stone muxrabija with decorative style
- Ta’ Ghammar, in western Gozo
- Il-Knisja Street, Gharb
- Doni Street, Rabat, Malta
- Ta’ Monita, Marsascala

== Bibliography ==
- Joe Azzopardi, "A Survey of the Maltese Muxrabijiet (Part 2)", VIGILO - DIN L-ART HELWA, October 2012
