= Senan Abdelqader =

Israeli architect (born 1962)

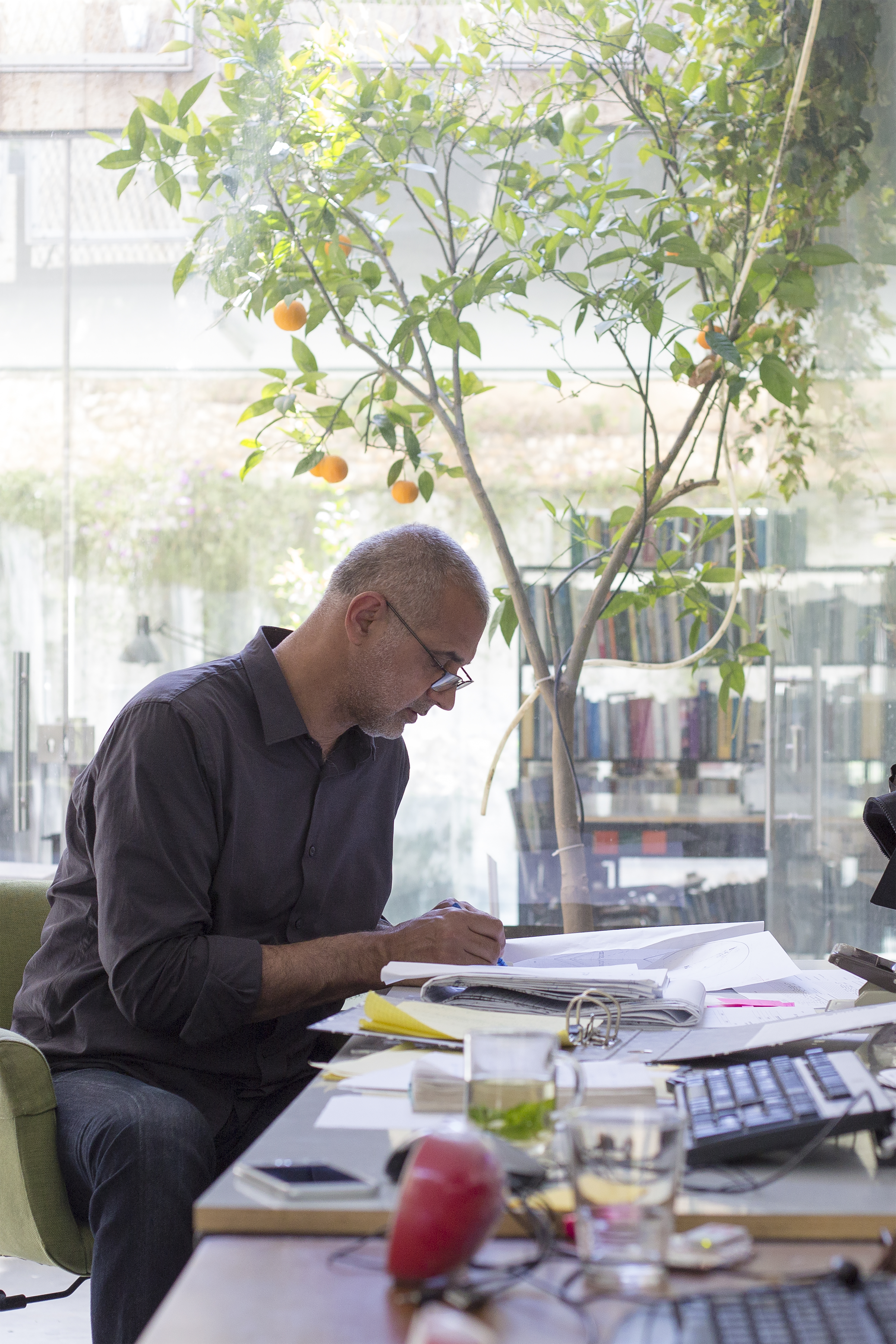
- Abdelqader at his Jerusalem office, 2015
- Born: Senan Hasan Qasem Abdelqader; 30 November 1962 (age 63); Tayibe, Israel
- Education: Technical University of Kaiserslautern
- Occupation: Architect
- Practice: Senan Architects
- Buildings: Al-Mashrabiya Building
- Website: www.senanarchitects.com

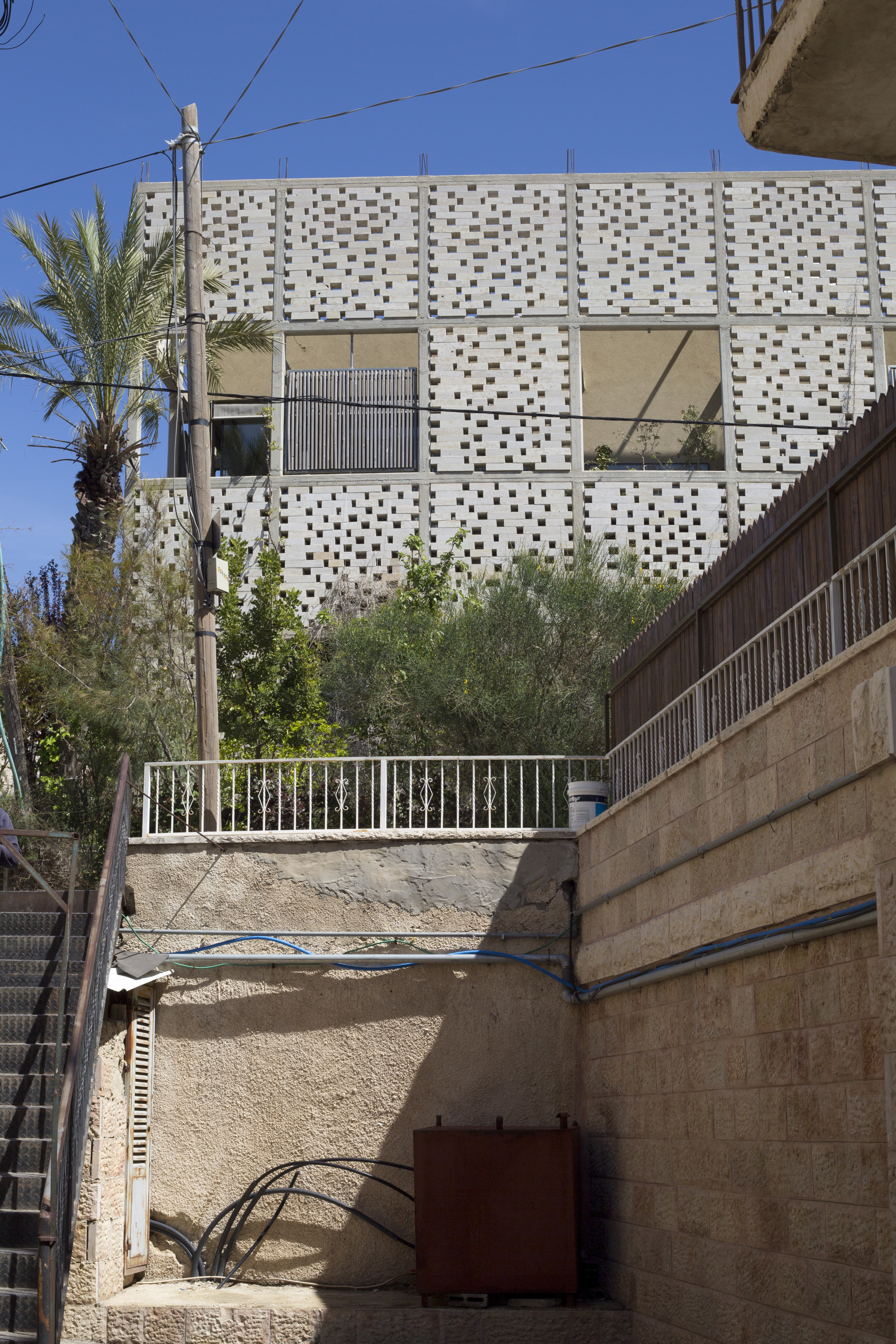
al-Mashrabiya Building

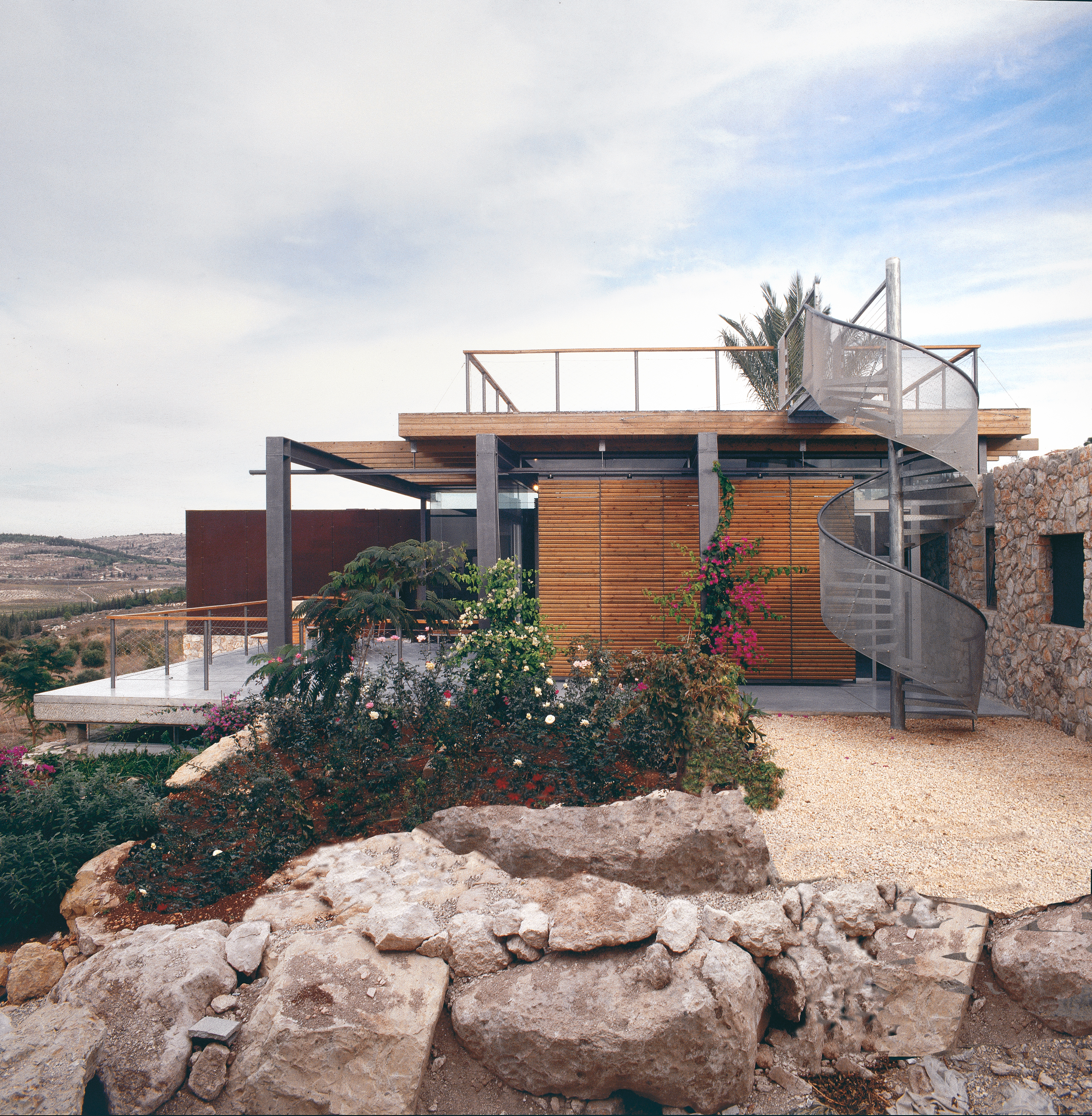
The Terrace House by architect Senan Abdelqader, located in Nave-Shalom

Senan Hasan Qasem Abdelqader (Arabic: سنان عبدالقادر; born 30 November 1962) is a Palestinian architect and urban planner. In 2007 he participated in the São Paulo Biennale in Brazil, where he published his book entitled Architecture of (in)Dependence.

Abdelqader established his firm Senan Architects in Jerusalem in 1995, and in Jaffa in 2015.

== Early life and education ==
Abdelqader was born on 30 November 1962 in Tayibe, an Arab town located in the central part of Israel. Upon graduating from high school, he moved to Germany and started studying civil engineering at Hamburg University of Applied Sciences, before moving to study architecture at University of Kaiserslautern.

== Academic ==
Abdelqader has taught at Tel Aviv University in 1998, and founded the in+Formal Architecture Research Unit in the Bezalel Academy of Arts and Design in 2006. In 2011, he became a guest professor in Dessau Institute of Architecture (DIA) in Germany.

In the year of 2016, Abdelqader was granted his professorship rank by the Council for Higher Education in Israel, making him the first professor in the history of Palestinians in Israel in the discipline of architecture.

In 2018, Abdelqader established the Institute for the Study of Arab Culture in Visual Arts, Design and Architecture. The institute works on constructing an academic space that enables interaction with the Arab legacy and modernisation processes in general, and in particular in Palestine.

== Major projects ==
=== al-Mashrabiya Building, Jerusalem (2012) ===
Al-Mashrabiya Building, located in Southern Jerusalem, is a residential and commercial building. Abdelqader described the building as “a contemporary reinterpretation of traditional elements of Arab vernacular architecture”. Like many of his projects, al-Mashrabiya Building carries with it political, social, economic and environmental critique of what he perceives as oppressive and out of context planning policies on the one hand, and conservative, romantic traditionalism on the other.

== Selected writings ==
Architecture of (in)Dependence, 2007
