= Mashrabiya =

Islamic architectural element

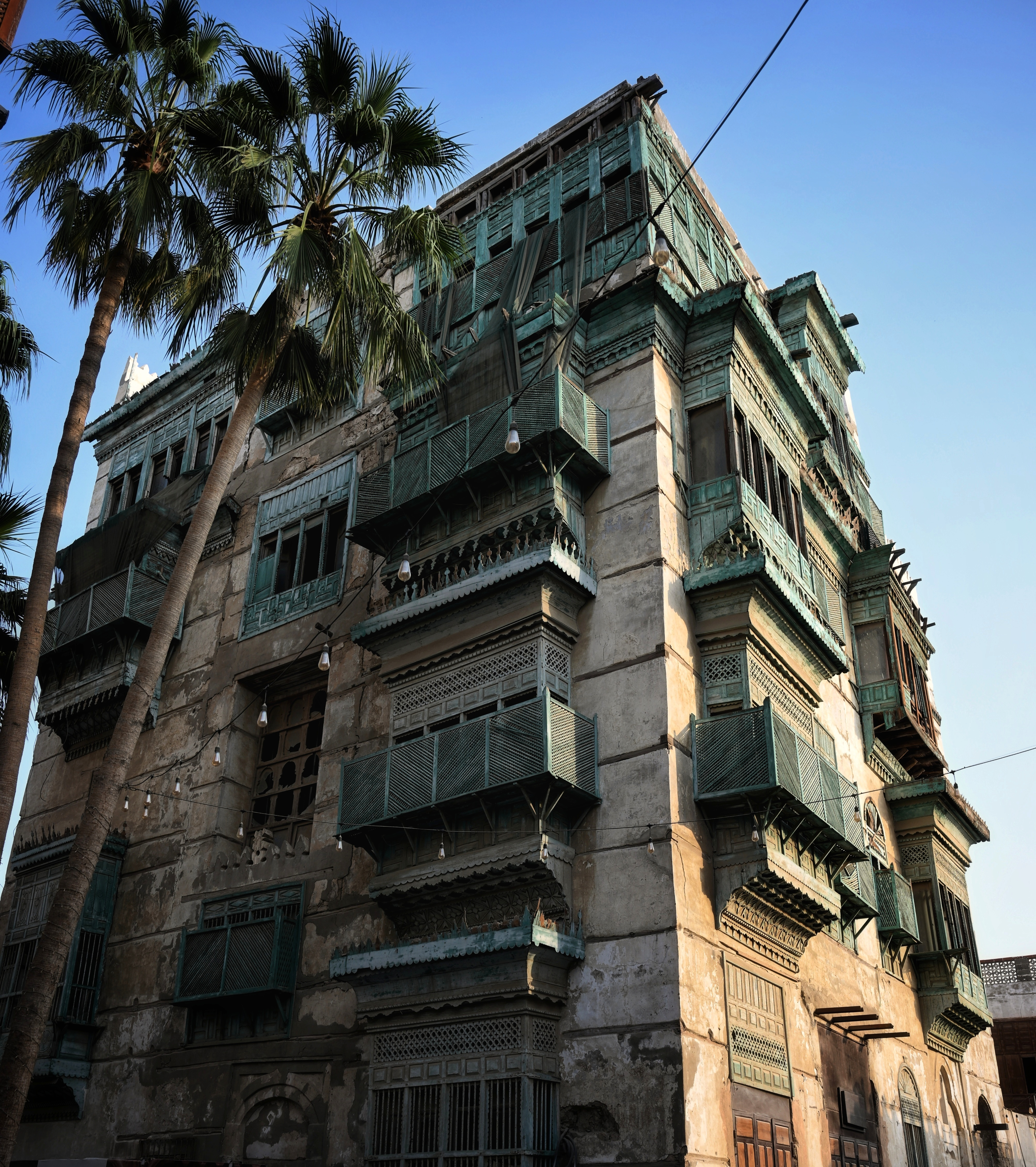
A Rowshin mashrabiya, Jeddah

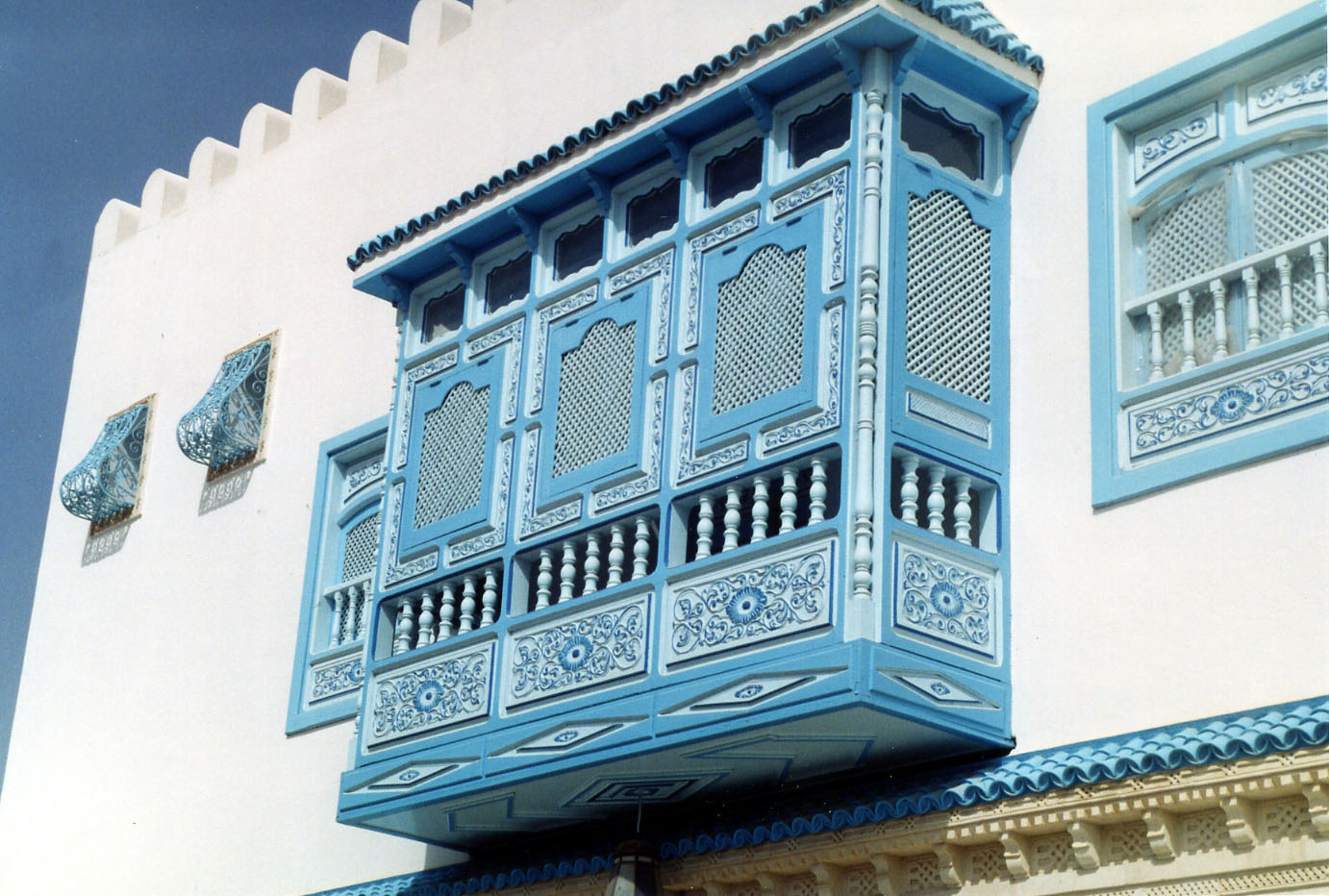
A Gannariya mashrabiya in Tunisia

A mashrabiya or mashrabiyya (Arabic: مشربية) is an architectural element which is characteristic of traditional architecture in the Islamic world and beyond. It is a type of projecting oriel window enclosed with carved wood latticework located on the upper floors of a building, sometimes enhanced with stained glass. It was traditionally used to catch wind and for passive cooling. Jars and basins of water could be placed in it to cause evaporative cooling. It is most commonly used on the street side of the building; however, it may also be used internally on the sahn (courtyard) side. The term mashrabiya is sometimes used of similar lattices elsewhere, for instance in a takhtabush. It is similar to Indian jali.

It has been used since the Middle Ages, reached a peak during the Ottoman period, but fell into decline in the late 19th century and the first half of the 20th century. However, interest in sustainable architecture has contributed to a revival of the mashrabiya and other elements of vernacular architecture.

== Names and etymology ==
The term mashrabiya is derived from the triliteral root Š-R-B, which generally denotes drinking or absorbing. There are two theories for its name:

- The more common theory is that the term was derived from the Arabic word, sharaba (meaning to drink) because the space was used for a small wooden shelf where the drinking water pots were stored. The shelf was enclosed by wood and located at the window in order to keep the water cool. Later on, this shelf evolved until it became part of the room with a full enclosure and retained the name despite the radical change in use.
- The less common theory is that the name was originally mashrafiya, derived from the verb shrafa, meaning to overlook or to observe. During the centuries, the name slowly changed because of sound change and the influence of other languages.

The mashrabiya is known by different labels across the Arab world; takhrima in Yemen; barmaqli or gannariya in Tunis, shanashil or rowshin in Iraq and Jeddah. It is also called shanshūl (شنشول) or rōshān (روشان).

Other terms also exist to describe variants of this architectural feature beyond the Arabic world. In Turkish it is called şahnişin, from Persian, adopted into Greek as sachnisi. In Malta, they are known by the cognate term muxrabija.

== History ==
The origins of mashrabiya are uncertain; however, the earliest evidence of the mashrabiya, in its current form, dates to the 12th century in Baghdad during the Abbasid period.

In Iraq during the 1920s and 1930s, the designs of the latticework were influenced by the Art Nouveau and Art Deco movements of the time.

Mashrabiyas, along with other distinct features of historic Islamic architecture, were being demolished as part of a modernisation program across the Arab world from the first decades of the 20th century. In Baghdad, members of the arts community feared that vernacular architecture would be lost permanently and took steps to preserve them. The architect, Rifat Chadirji and his father, Kamil, photographed structures and monuments across Iraq and the Saudi region, and published a book of photographs. Such initiatives have contributed to a renewed interest in traditional practices as a means of building sustainable residences in harsh climatic conditions.

== Construction ==
Mashrabiya are vernacular architectural elements; a type of balcony or oriel window in the form of a small latticed opening encasing the second or higher floors of a building and typically overlooking an internal courtyard. They are usually cantilevered to add more square footage to the upper floors, as well as providing shade to the first-floor windows. The lattice work ranges from simple geometric shapes through to ornate patterns. Architecturally, they are designed to satisfy one or more of the following functions:

- control air flow
- reduce the temperature of the air current
- increase the humidity of the air current
- provide privacy

Latticework designs differ from region to region, however the commonly used patterns include:

- Hexagonal – a simple geometric design with repeating hexagonal patterns
- Kanaysi or Church – long narrow balusters which are assembled vertically
- Maymoni – mesh with rounded balusters in some sections and squared balusters in other areas
- Cross – the short round balusters assembled diagonally, vertical and horizontally
- Sahrigi (Cistern turnery) large balusters in a wide mesh, and it is typically used in the upper part of the Mashrabiya
- Other – a variety of complex patterns using amalgamation of existing designs and repetition, used by skilled artisans

Effective ventilation and passive cooling could be enhanced by adding a water jar, also known as a qullah, inside the mashrabiya.

Most mashrabiyas are closed where the latticework is lined with stained glass and part of the mashrabiya is designed to be opened like a window, often sliding windows to save space; in this case the area contained is part of the upper floor rooms hence enlarging the floor plan. Some mashrabiyas are open and not lined with glass; the mashrabiya functions as a balcony and the space enclosed is independent of the upper floor rooms and accessed through those rooms with windows opening towards it. Sometimes the woodwork is reduced making the mashrabiya resemble a regular roofed balcony; this type of mashrabiya is mostly used if the house is facing an open landscape such as a river, a cliff below or simply a farm, rather than other houses.

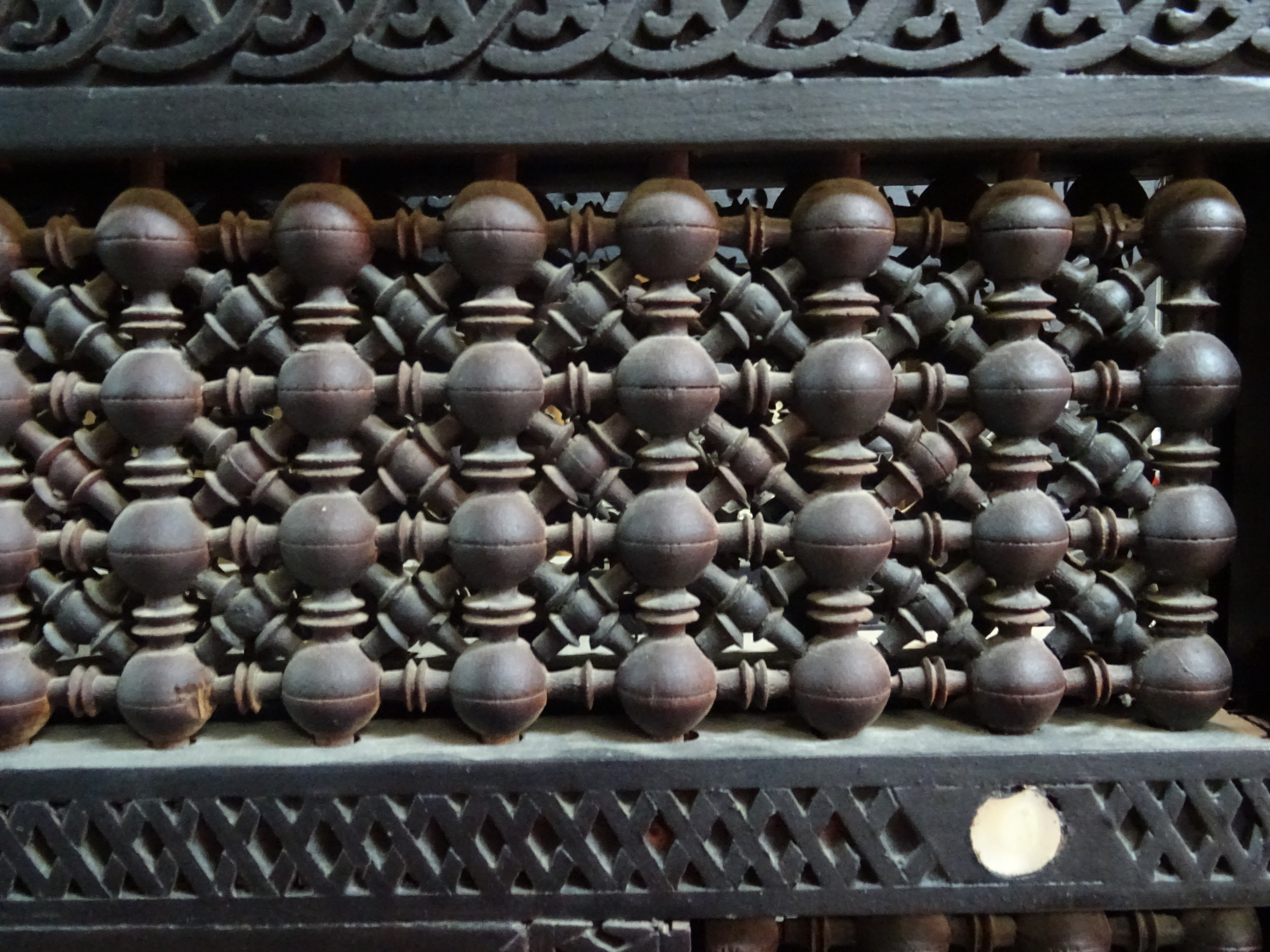
Maymoni pattern as used in mashrabiya

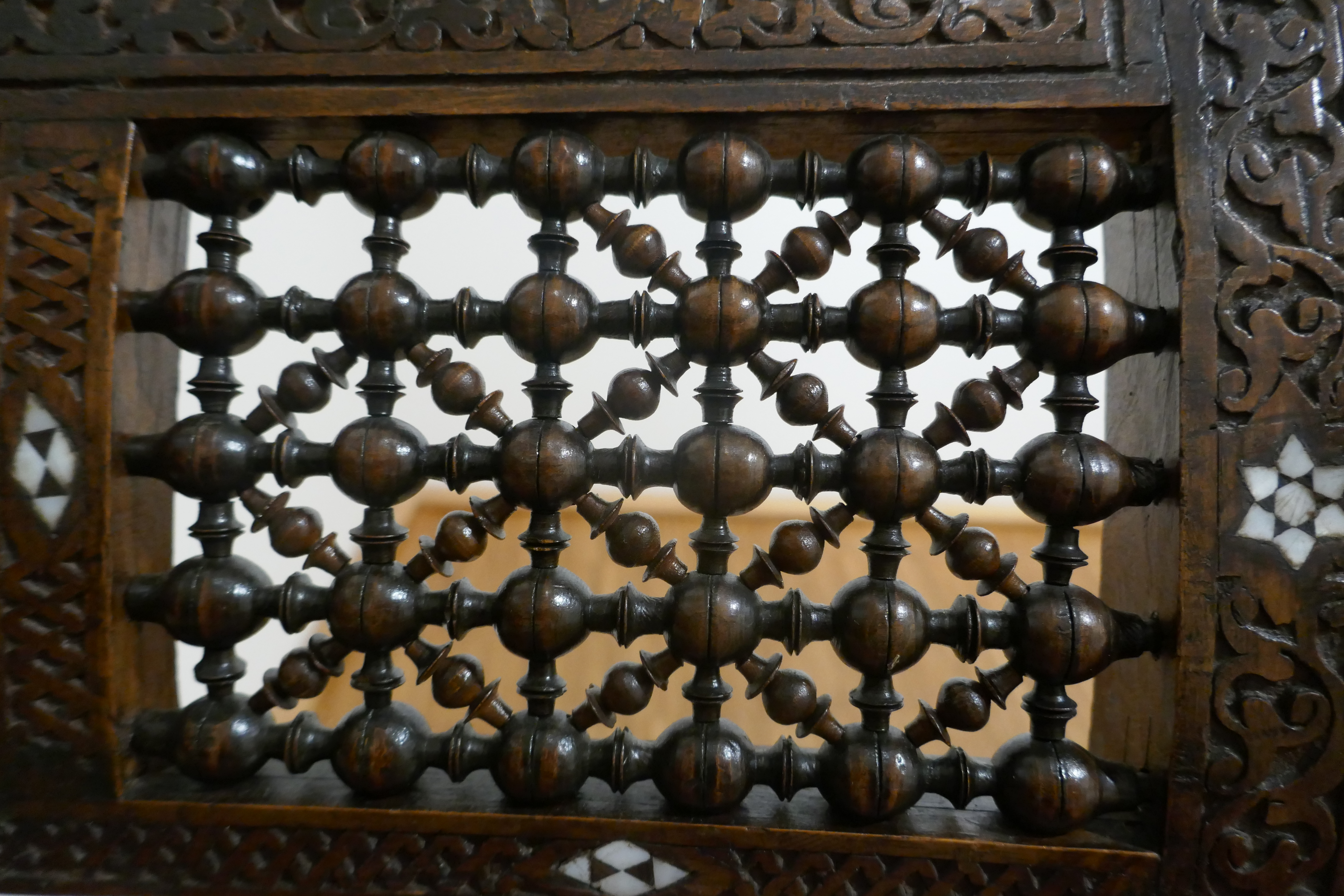
Cross pattern as used in mashrabiya

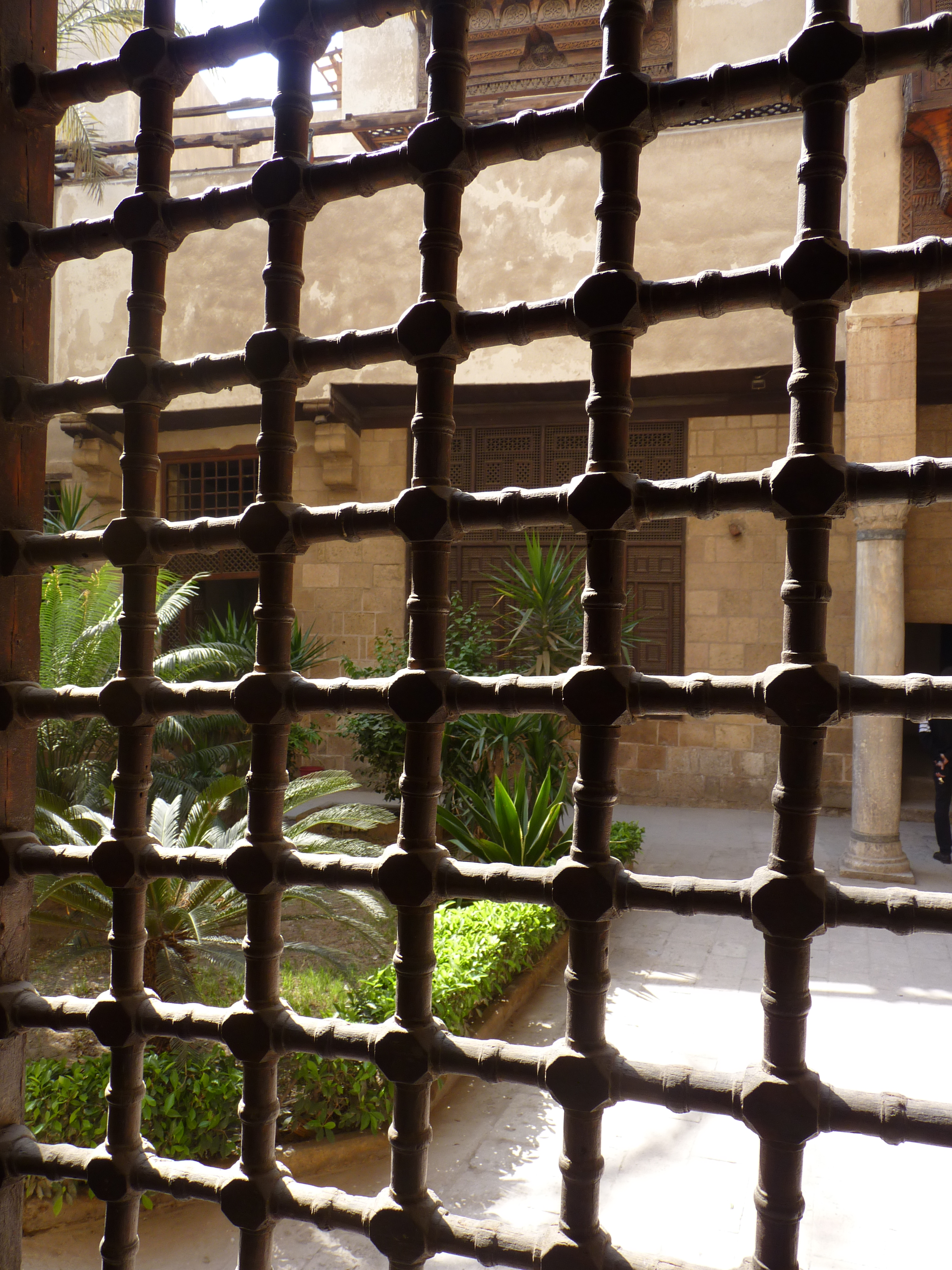
Sahrigi pattern as used in mashrabiya

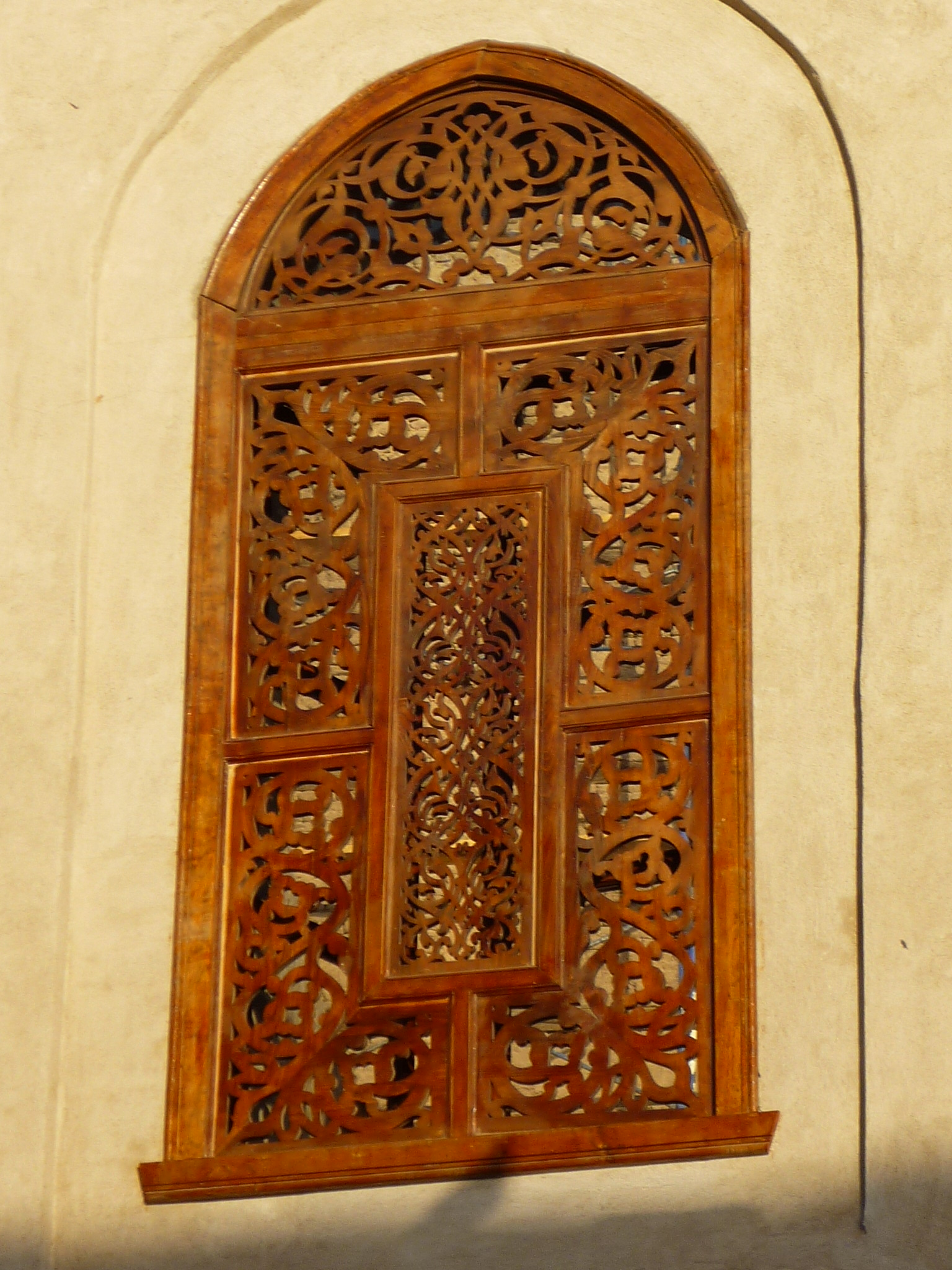
Complex lattice pattern used in a temple at Luxor

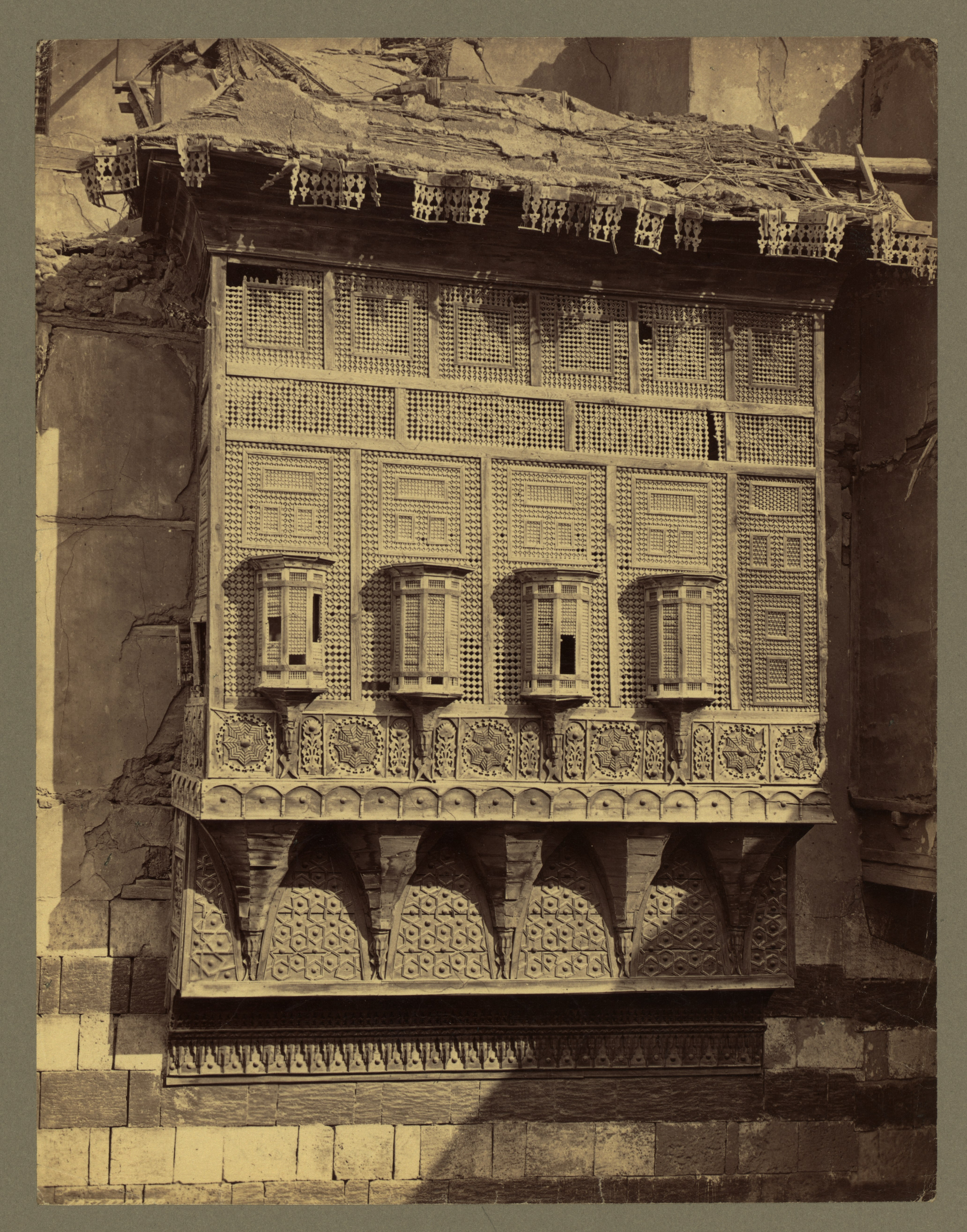
Mashrabiya lattice in Cairo showing a mix of hexagonal and other patterns

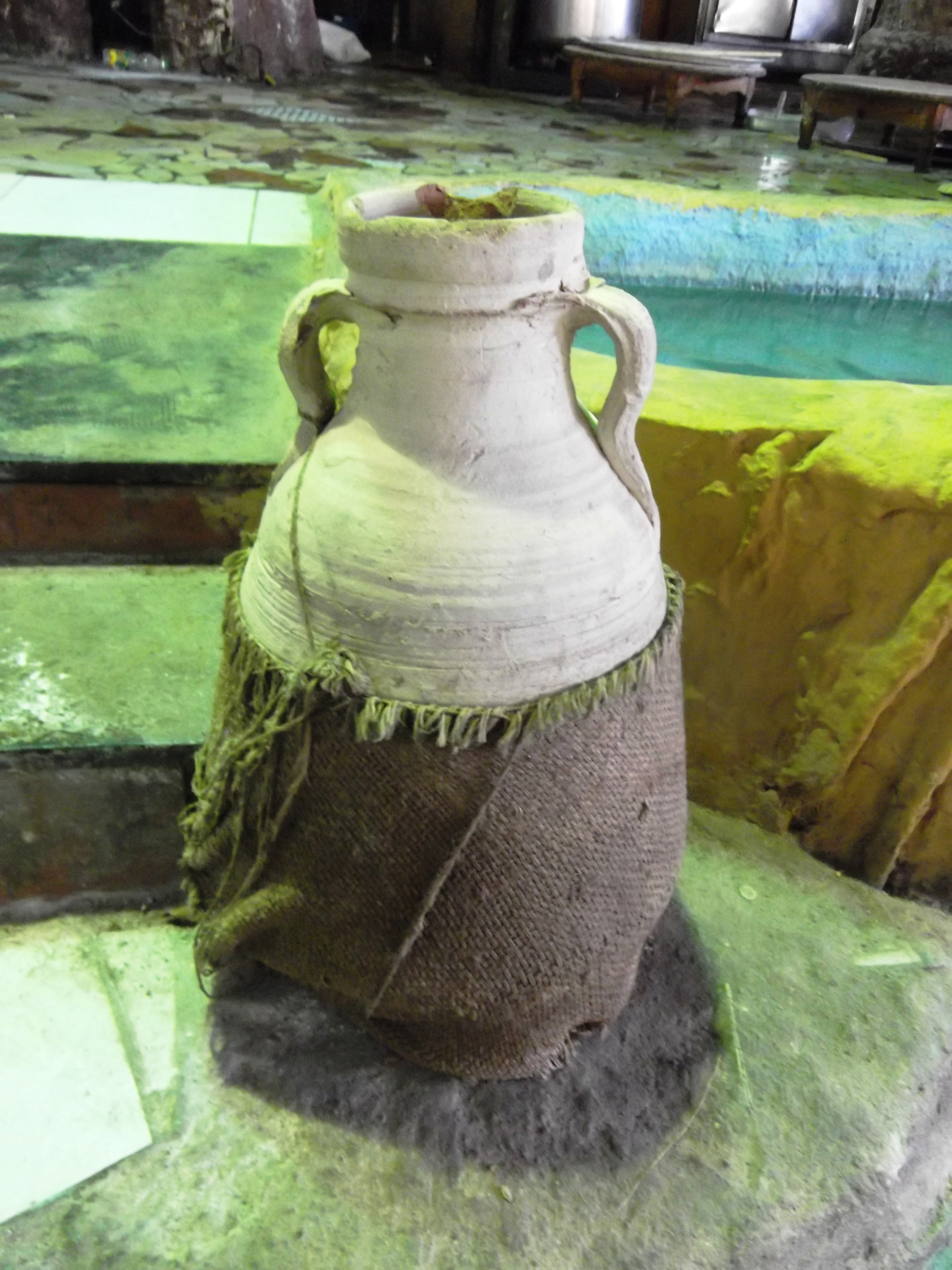
A water jar or qullah might be placed in a mashrabiya for passive cooling

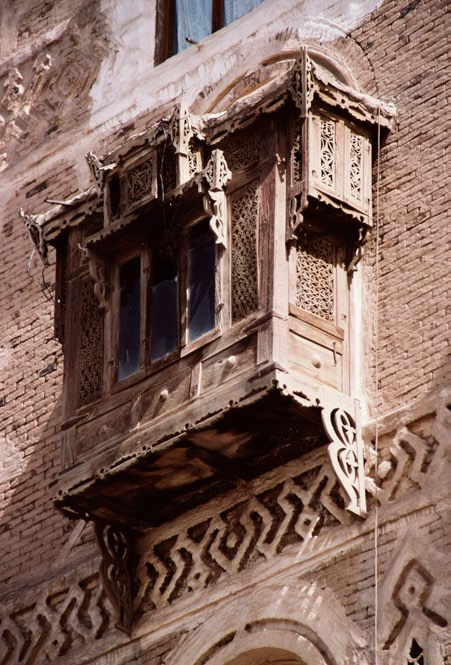
A Mashrabiya in the old city of Sanaa

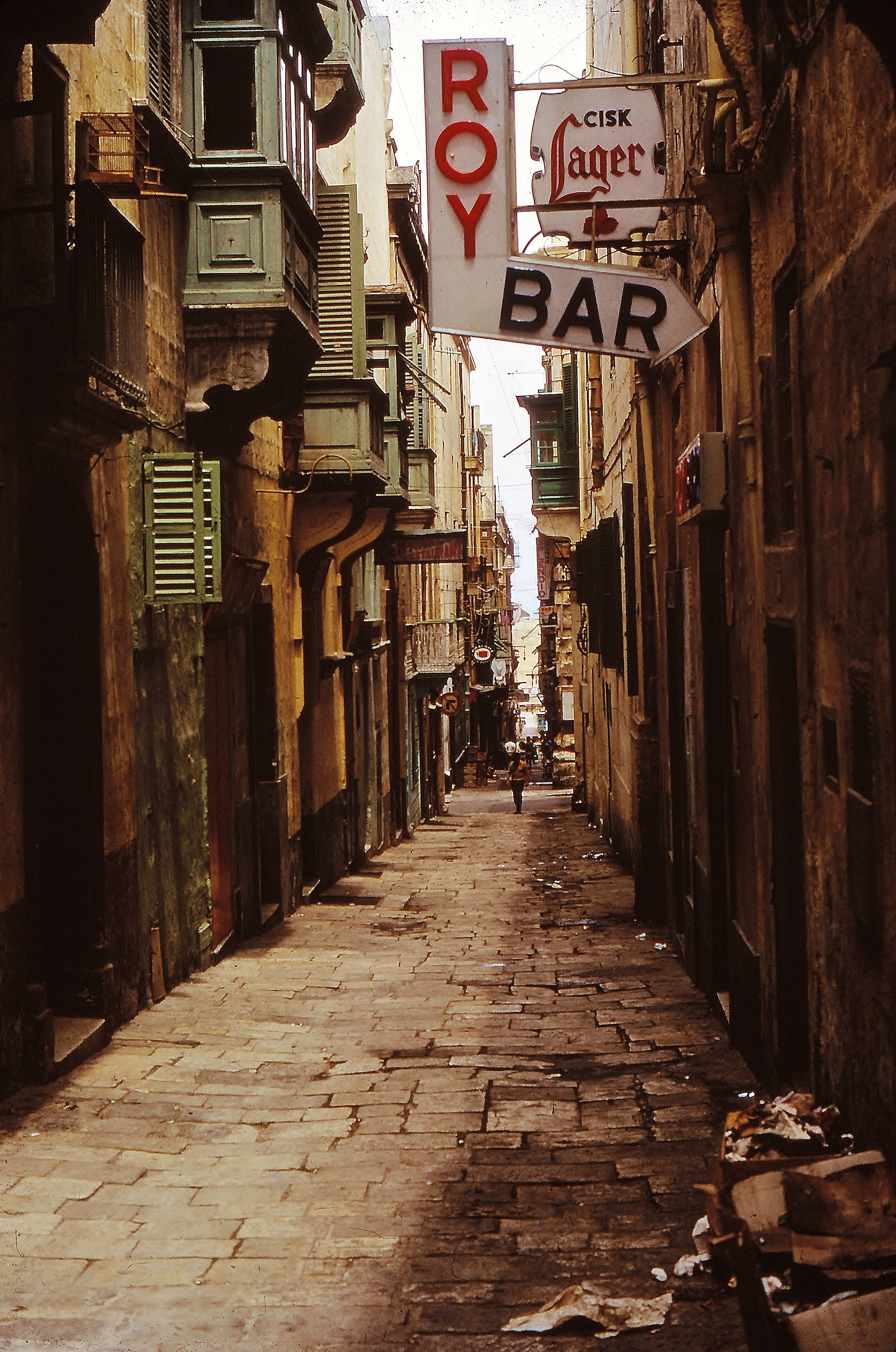
An early morning in 1967 on Malta's famous Straight Street, showing its many *gallariji*.

== Functions ==
=== Social ===
One of the major purposes of the mashrabiya is privacy, an essential aspect of Arab culture. From the mashrabiya window, occupants can obtain a good view of the street without being seen.

The mashrabiya was an integral part of Arab lifestyle. Typically, people did not sleep in any assigned room, rather they would take their mattresses and move to areas that offered the greatest comfort according to the seasons: to the mashrabiya (or shanashil) in winter, to the courtyard in spring or to vaulted basements in summer.

=== Environment ===
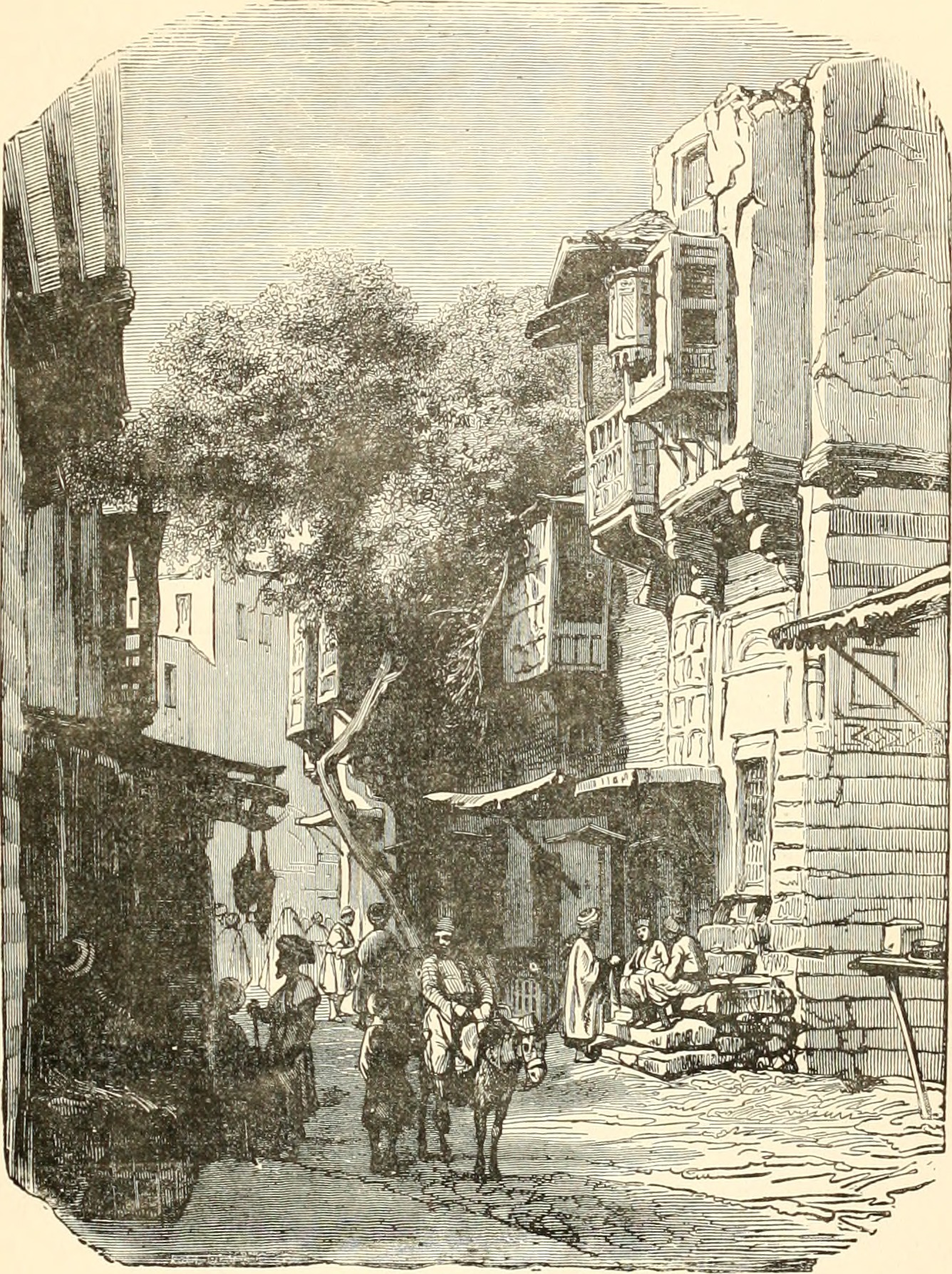
Cairo cityscape showing residential buildings with mashrabiyas; illustration from *Around the World with Philip Phillips, "The Singing Pilgrim"*, 1887.

The wooden screen with openable windows gives shade and protection from the hot summer sun, while allowing the cool air from the street to flow through. The designs of the latticework usually have smaller openings in the bottom part and larger openings in the higher parts, hence causing the draft to be fast above the head and slow in lower parts. This provides a significant amount of air moving in the room without causing it to be uncomfortable. The air-conditioning properties of the window is typically enhanced by placing jars of water in the area, allowing air to be cooled by evaporative cooling as it passes over the jars.

The projection of the mashrabiya achieves several purposes: it allows air from three sides to enter, even if the wind outside is blowing parallel to the house façade; it serves the street, and in turn the neighborhood, as a row of projected mashrabiyas provides shelter for those in the streets from rain or sun. The shade in normally narrow streets will cool the air in the street and increase the pressure as opposed to the air in the sahn, which is open to the sun making it more likely that air would flow towards the sahn through the rooms of the house; the mashrabiya also provides protection and shade for the ground floor windows that are flat and usually unprotected.

=== Architecture ===
In addition to their ornamental advantage, mashrabiyas served to provide enclosure to the street.

Mashrabiyas were mostly used in houses and palaces although sometimes in public buildings such as hospitals, inns, schools and government buildings. They tend to be associated with houses of the urban elite classes. They are found mostly in the Mashriq – i.e. the eastern part of the Arab world (Iraq, the Levant, Hejaz region in Saudi Arabia and Egypt) in addition to Tunisia and Malta. In Basra, where they are very prevalent, they are known as shanasheel (or shanashil) to the extent that Basra is often called "the city of Shanashil." Some 400 traditional buildings are still standing in Basra. They are also very prevalent in the historical city center of Jeddah (Al-Balad) where they are known as Rōšān (Pl. Rawāšīn).

In Malta, mashrabiyas (known as muxrabija) are quite common, especially in dense urban areas. They are usually made from wood and include glass windows, but there are also variations made from stone or aluminium. They could possibly originate from around the tenth century during the Arab occupation of the islands. The modern word for it in the Maltese language is "gallarija", which is of Italic origin. Recognised as being the predecessors of the iconic closed balcony, or "gallarija", in 2016 Maltese authorities scheduled a total of 36 ancient mashrabiyas as Grade 2 protected properties.

The facade of Institut du Monde Arabe in Paris by Architecture-Studio and Jean Nouvel are inspired by Mashrabiya.

== Notable examples ==
=== Traditional ===
- Bayt al-Suhaymi in Cairo, Egypt – Ottoman house, built 1648 and expanded in 1796
- Shubra Palace in Taif, Saudi Arabia – built in 1858
- Nasseef House in Jeddah, Saudi Arabia – built in 1872
- Bayt al-Razzaz palace in Cairo – urban palace first built in the 15th century during the Mamluk era, featuring multiple mashrabiyas
- House of Ali Effendi Labib in Cairo – originally built in the late 12th century
- Bayt al-Kritliya in Cairo – originally built in 1631, now the Gayer-Anderson Museum
- Hasht Behesht Palace in Isfahan, Iran
- Amber Palace in Amer, India
- Prince Mohammed Ali Tewfik Palace in Cairo – built in the early 20th century
Traditional mashrabiyas

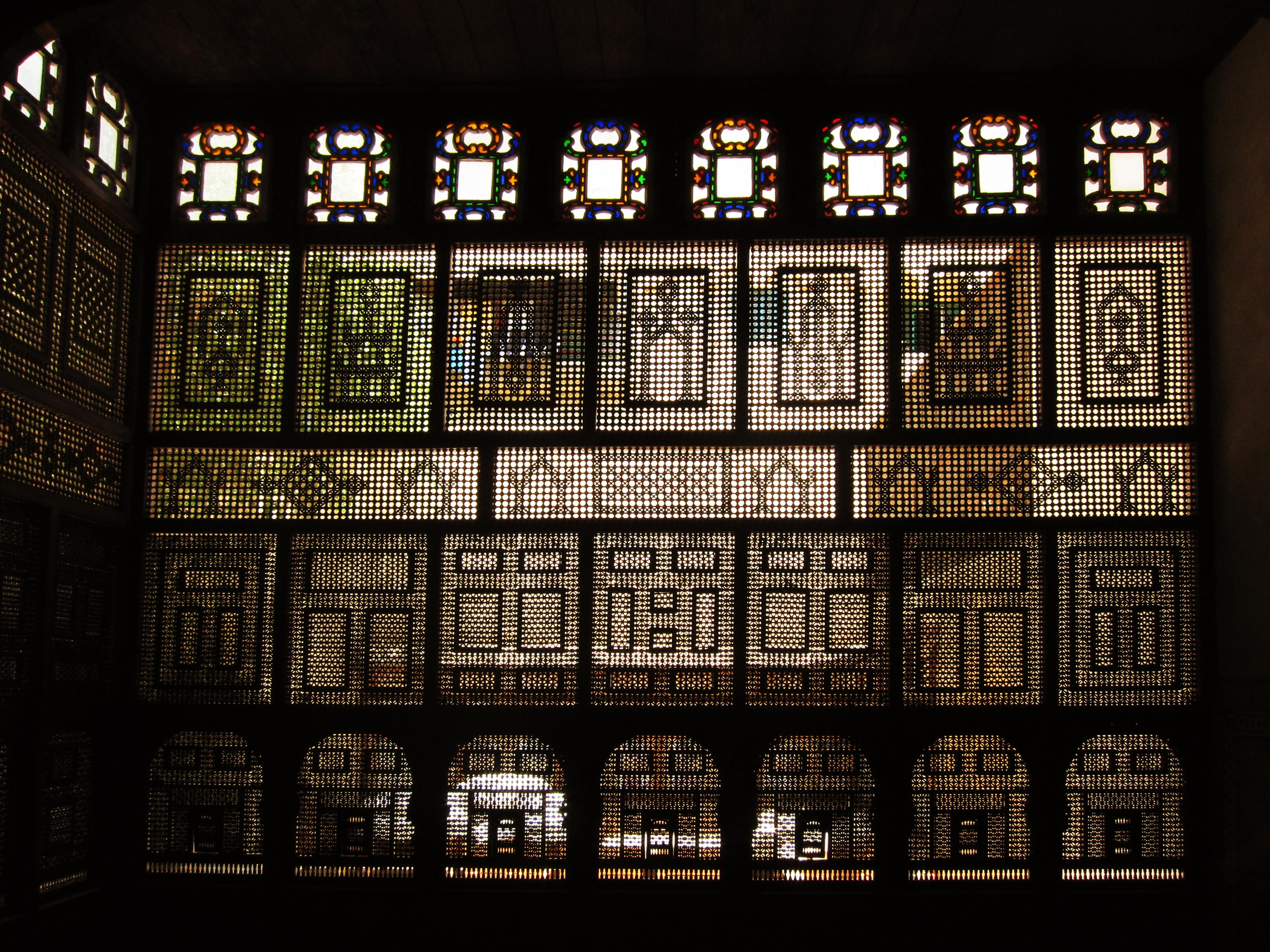
Bayt al-Suhaymi, Cairo, Egypt

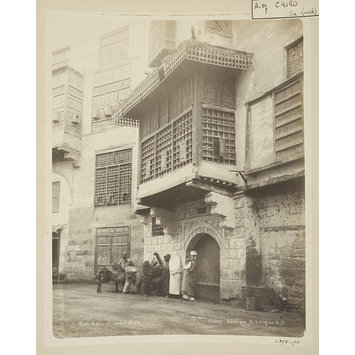
Mashrabiya exterior at Bayt al-Razzaz, Cairo, Egypt

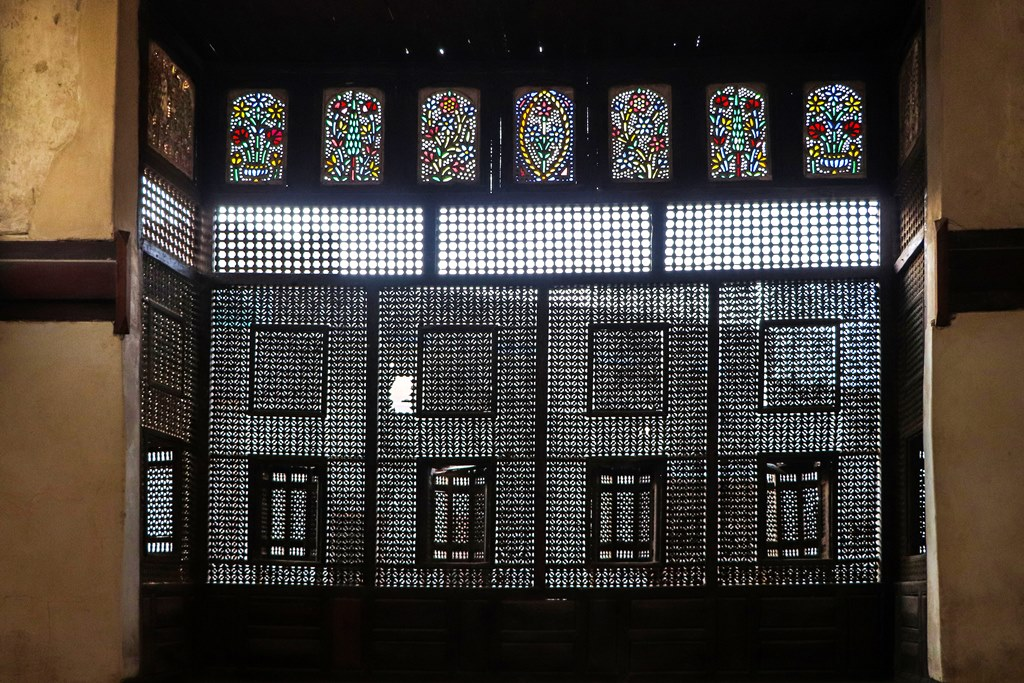
Mashrabiya interior at Bayt al Razzaz, Cairo, Egypt

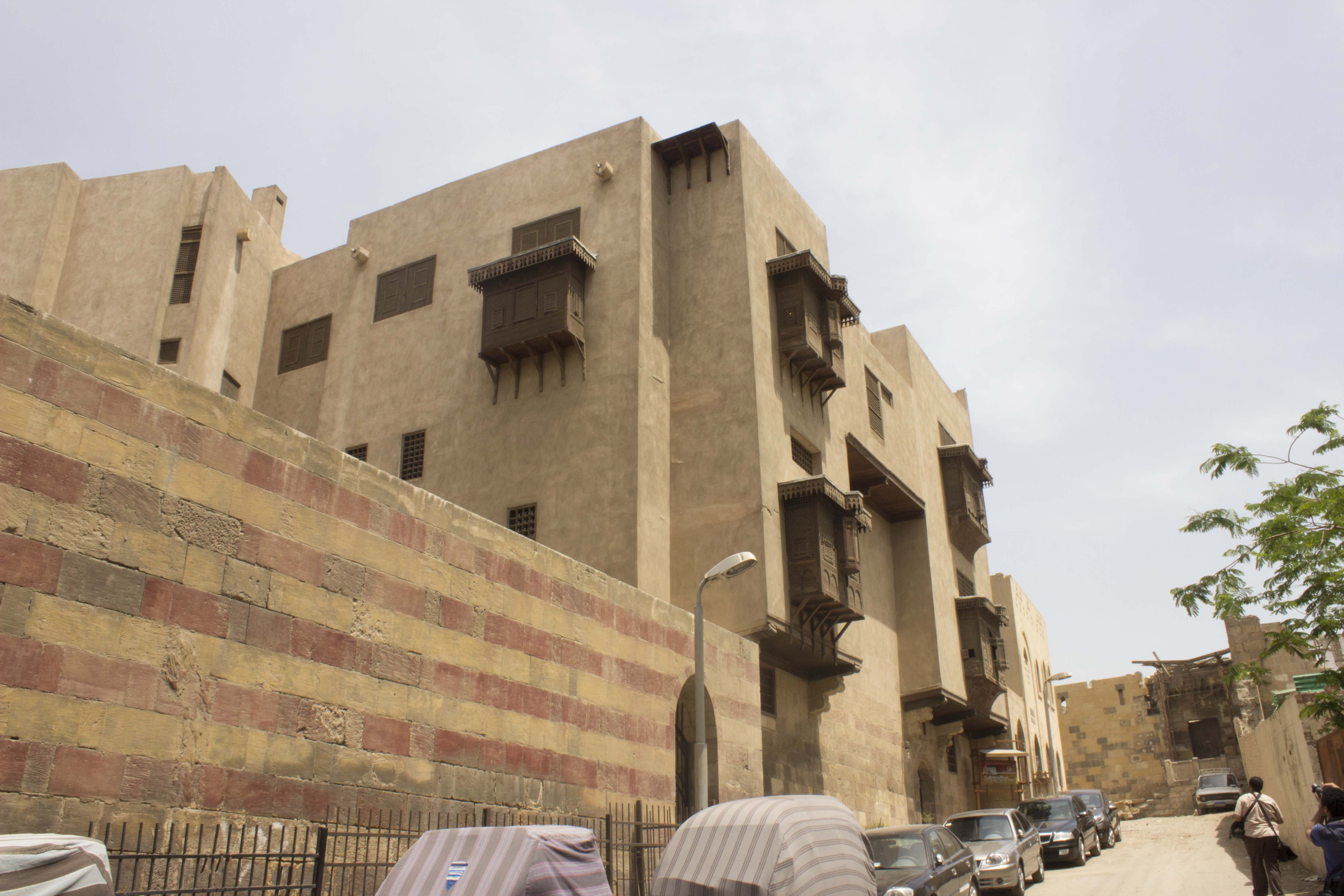
House of Ali Effendi Labib, Cairo, Egypt

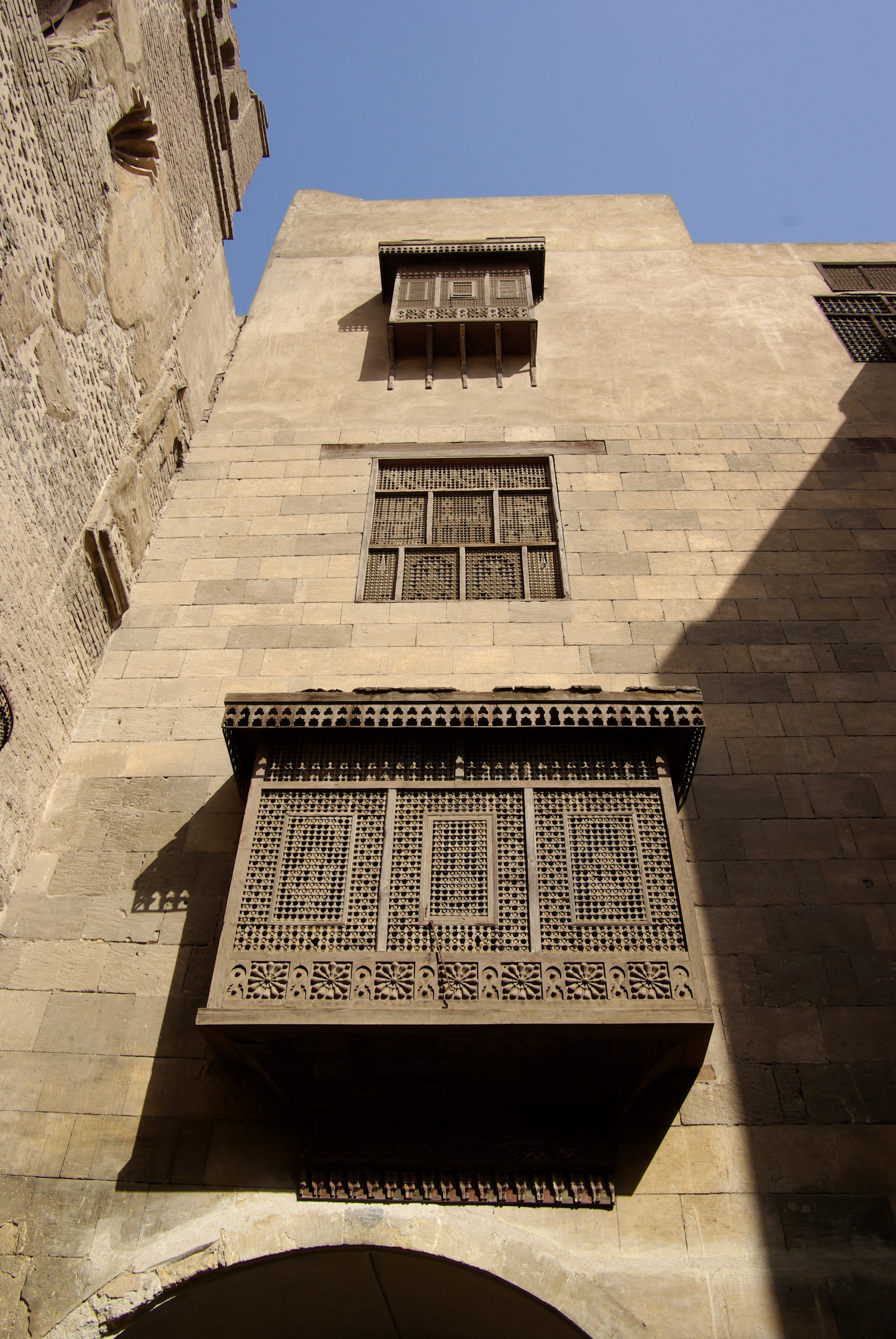
Bayt al-Kritliya, now the Gayer-Anderson Museum, Cairo

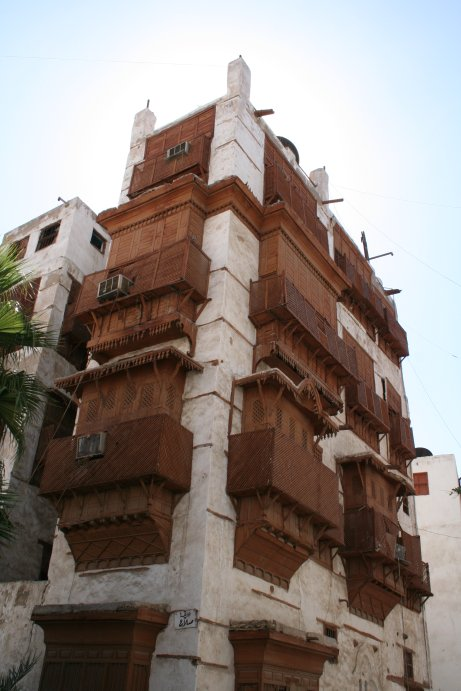
Traditional house in Jeddah, (Al-Balad District), Hejaz, Saudi Arabia

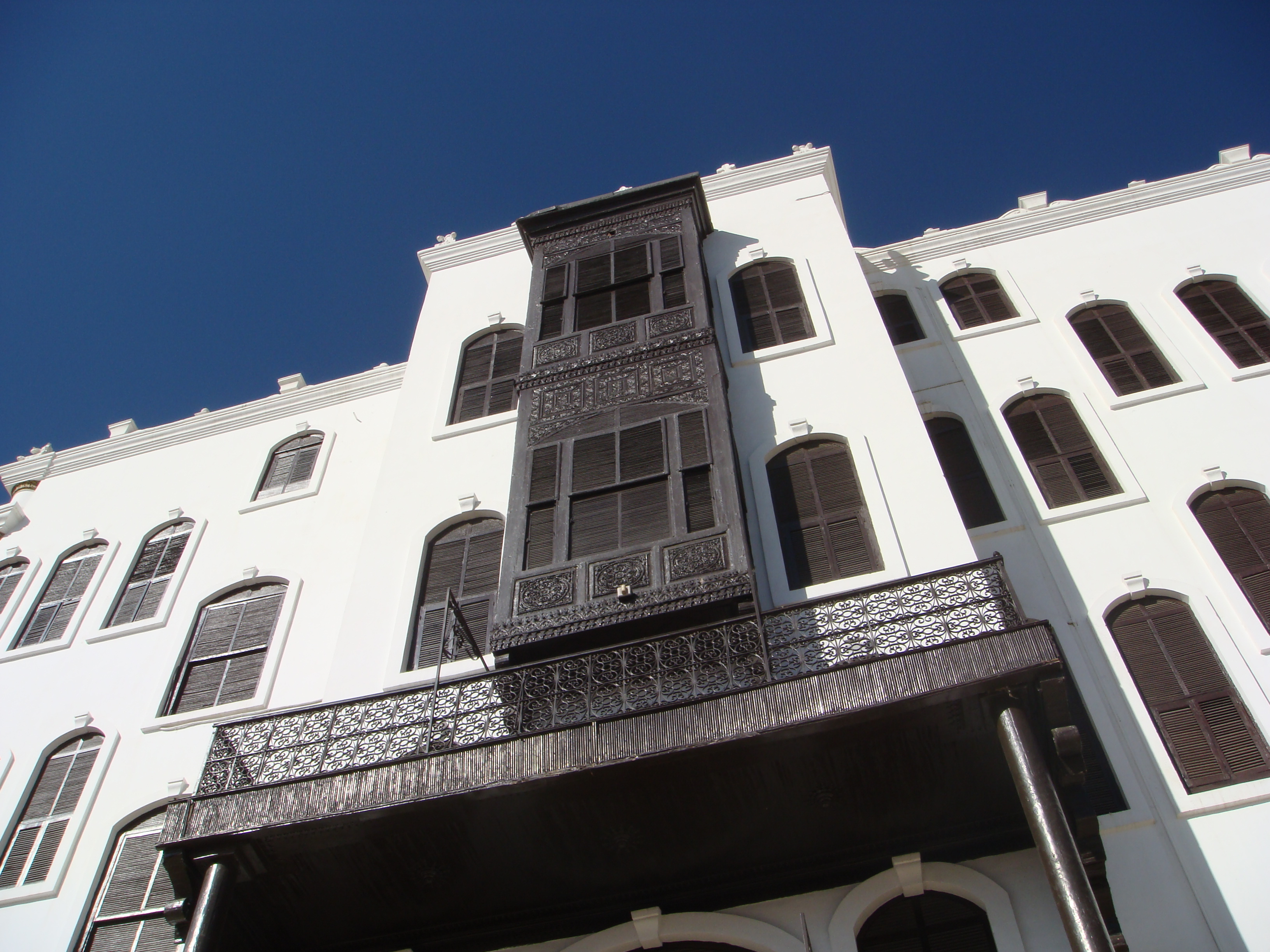
Traditional house in Jeddah, (Al-Balad District), Hejaz, Saudi Arabia

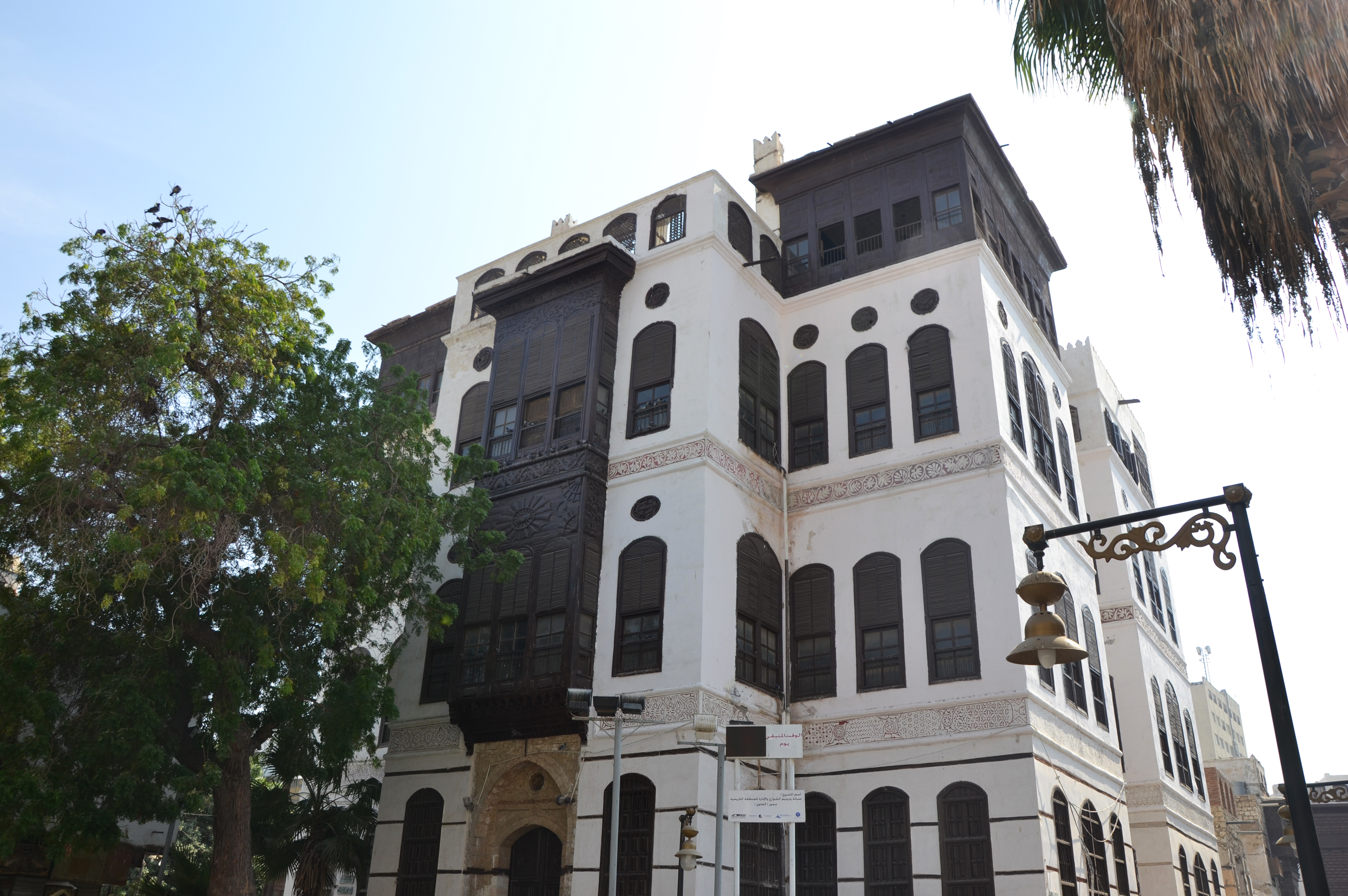
Al-Naseef House, Jeddah, Hejaz, Saudi Arabia

=== Contemporary ===
- Mashrabiya House in Beit Safafa, Jerusalem – a modern reinterpretation of a traditional building
- Institut du Monde Arabe in Paris, France – a contemporary building, completed in 1987, inspired by the façades of Arabic architecture
- Doha Tower in Doha, Qatar – a contemporary structure that references mashrabiya
- Louvre Abu Dhabi in Abu Dhabi, United Arab Emirates – the dome of the museum was inspired by traditional mashrabiya
- Al Bahr Towers in Abu Dhabi – twin towers that use the principles of mashrabiya for effective thermal control
Contemporary interpretations of the mashrabiya

Institut du Monde Arabe – a contemporary building inspired by traditional mashrabiya façades

The Louvre Museum in Abu Dhabi, showing the dome and its geometric pattern

Doha Tower, Doha, Qatar

== In literature and art ==
As a distinctive element in vernacular architecture with symbolic associations, the mashrabiya has inspired many poets, artists and writers. Between the 16th and 19th centuries, Western travellers and adventurers, travelled overland from Aleppo to Basra, along the route known as the Great Desert Caravan Route, leaving behind journals of their journeys. Their accounts often include commentary on local architecture encountered, including window treatments and mashrabiya. Some of these writers include: the Portuguese explorer, Pedro Teixeira (who travelled in the 1580s), the Danish explorer and cartographer, Carsten Niebuhr (1733–1815), the English traveller, John Jackson (d. 1807), the German architectural historian, Oskar Reuther (1880–1954) and the English artist, Tristram Ellis (1844–1922).

The absence of ground floor windows at street level was a theme taken up in many travellers' accounts. William Beawes who travelled the route in 1745 considered the absence of street facing windows to be "very disagreeable to Europeans", while John Jackson, who travelled the same territory thirty years later remarked that homes resembled "prisons". Carsten Neibihr, the Danish cartographer, who travelled the route in the 1760s, noted that, in hot countries, glazed windows were a rarity; instead latticed window openings provided ventilation and light. Tristam Ellis, writing in 1881, provided a detailed account of shanshil in Baghdad:

It is always on the hareem that the greatest efforts of ornamentation are expended. The walls from the floor to the ceiling, as well as the ceiling itself, are covered with every colour of the rainbow in elaborate arabesque patterns ... windows appearing above this for the purpose of introducing air and light. ... When all the windows are open this system allows the free circulation of air during the hot weather, but enables secrets whispered in one room to be heard in all the rest. The windows overlooking the street are overhanging, supported on brackets, and carrying a settee all round. The upper part of the windows is ornamented with coloured glass, introduced in small pieces in a pierced wood pattern, which is painted black or a dark colour. The inhabitants of Baghdad are extremely proud of this form of ornamentation, which they consider belongs entirely to themselves, though its origin is no doubt Persian.

An elaborate mashrabiya could signal wealth and status. In the poem, The Shanasil of al-Chalabi’s Daughter, the Iraqi poet, Badr Shaker Alsyyab (1926–1964), describes his lover, al-Chalabi's daughter, coming into view from behind the shanashil or mashrabiya. The poem includes references to the social status of the lover's family who reside in the town's largest house complete with sophisticated mashrabiyas. The mashrabiya, with its concept of secluding women from public view, played into the erotic fantasies of European male audiences. John Frederick Lewis painted both interiors and exterior views of the mashrabiya in works such as: The Courtyard of the Coptic Patriarch's House in Cairo (1864); The Reception (1873), The Midday Meal (1875), and The Siesta, (1876). Other paintings that feature mashrabiya include Walter Charles Horsley's Women and an Old Man in the Harem (1883), Arthur von Ferraris’ The Coffee House (1888) and Jean-Léon Gérôme's The Horse Market, (1867).

Certain 20th century artists and photographers, such as Lorna Selim and Rifat Chadirji were prompted to document mashrabiyas for very different reasons. They feared that traditional architectural elements were in danger of being lost to "modernity" and sought to document them for posterity. The British artist, Lorna Selim, who married an Iraqi sculptor, was fascinated by vernacular architecture, especially that along the Tigris. Not long after her arrival in Baghdad, the city underwent a period of "modernisation," during which many traditional houses were being demolished. The architect, Rifat Chadirji and his father, Kamil Chadirji, used the camera to document traditional architecture across Iraq and Syria in the mid-1950s.

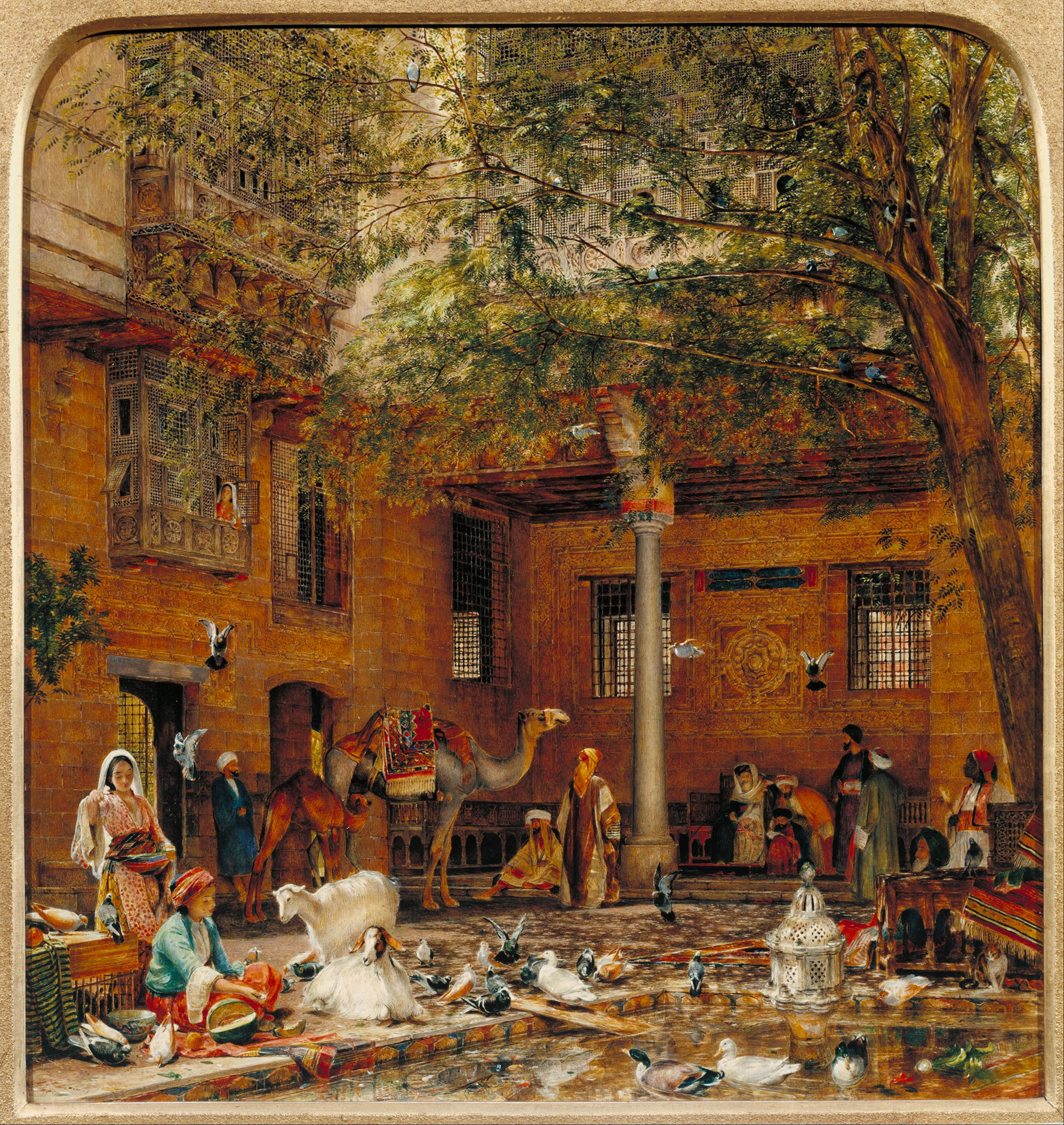
The Courtyard of the Coptic Patriarch's House in Cairo by John Frederick Lewis (1864)

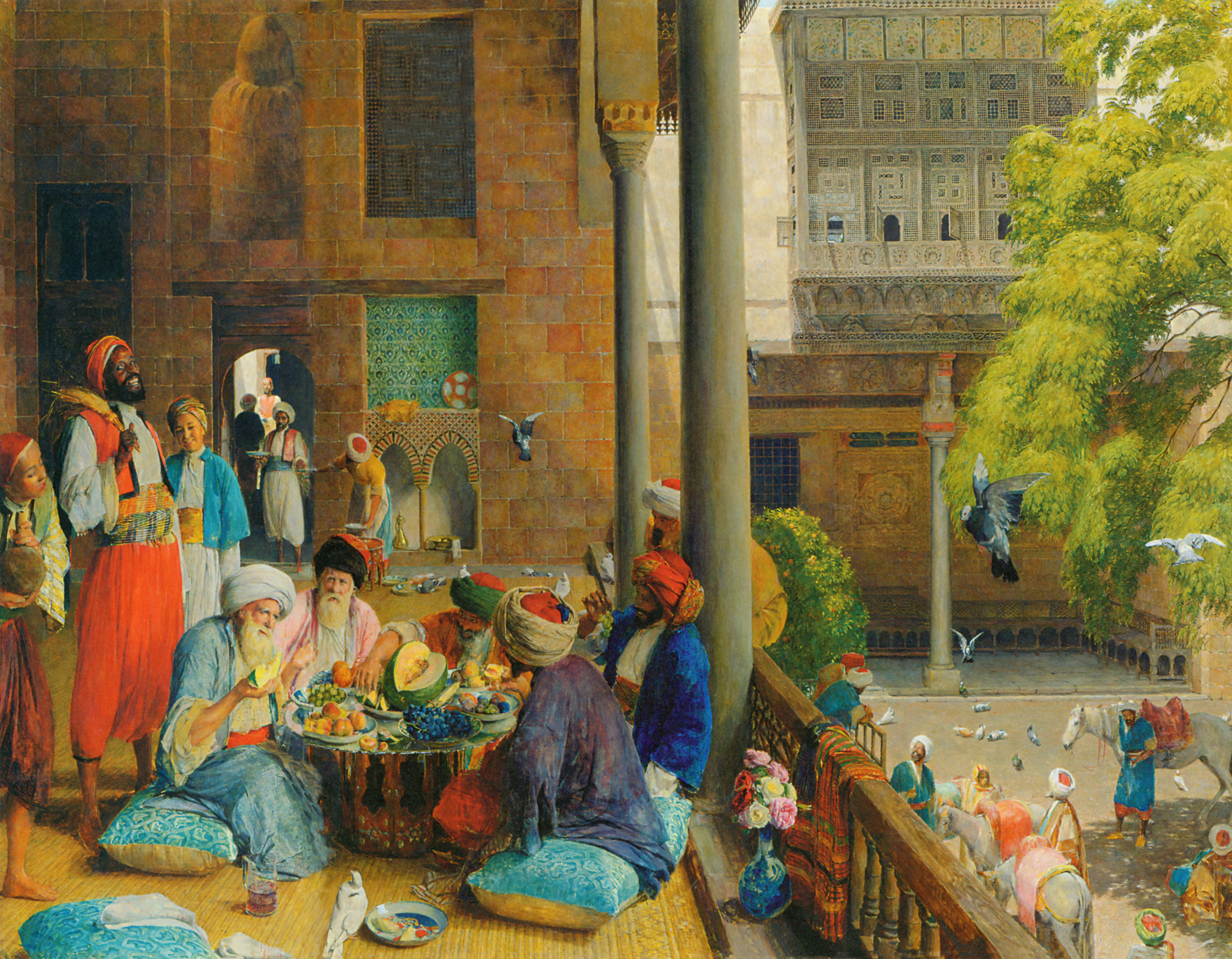
The Midday Meal by John Frederick Lewis, (1875)

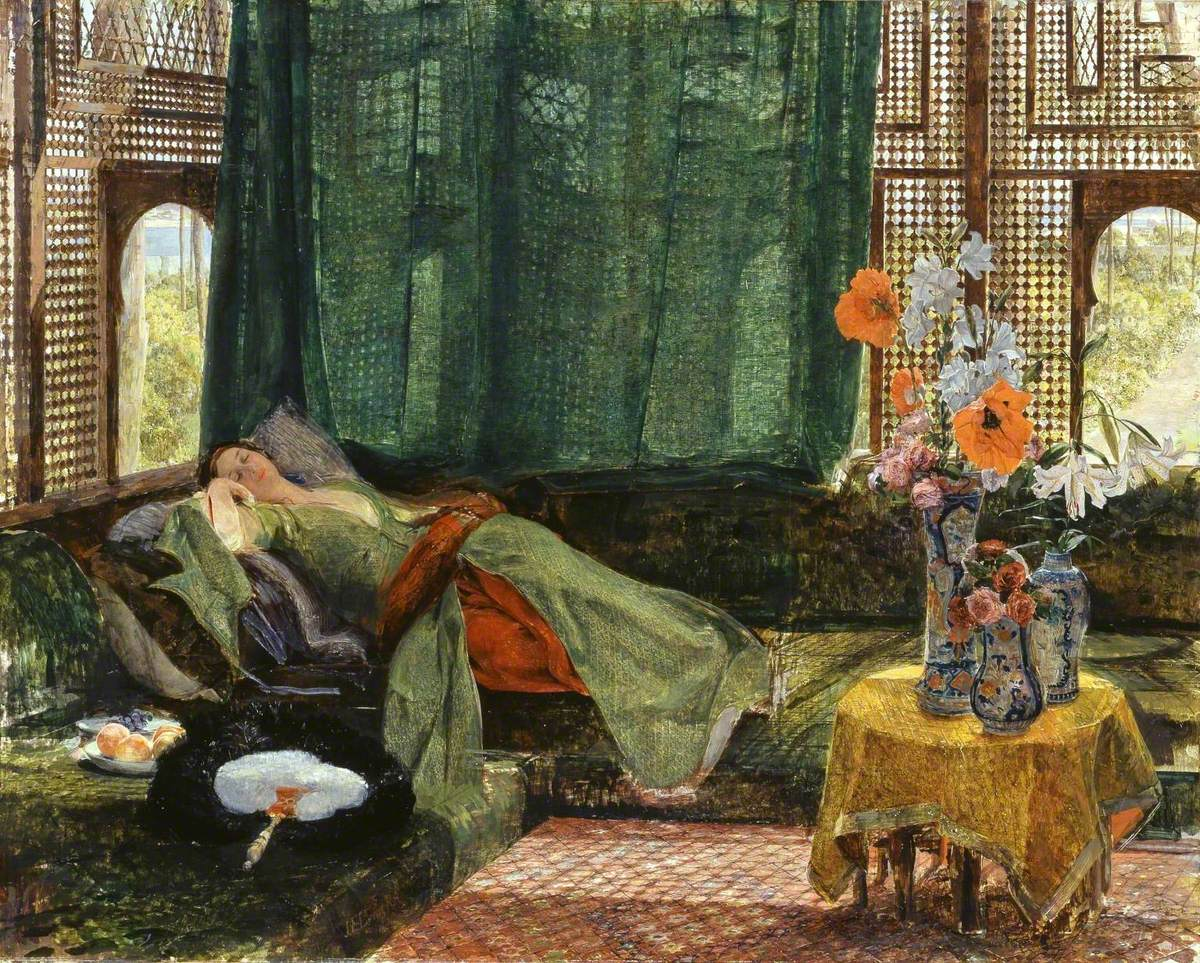
The Siesta by John Frederick Lewis, (1876)

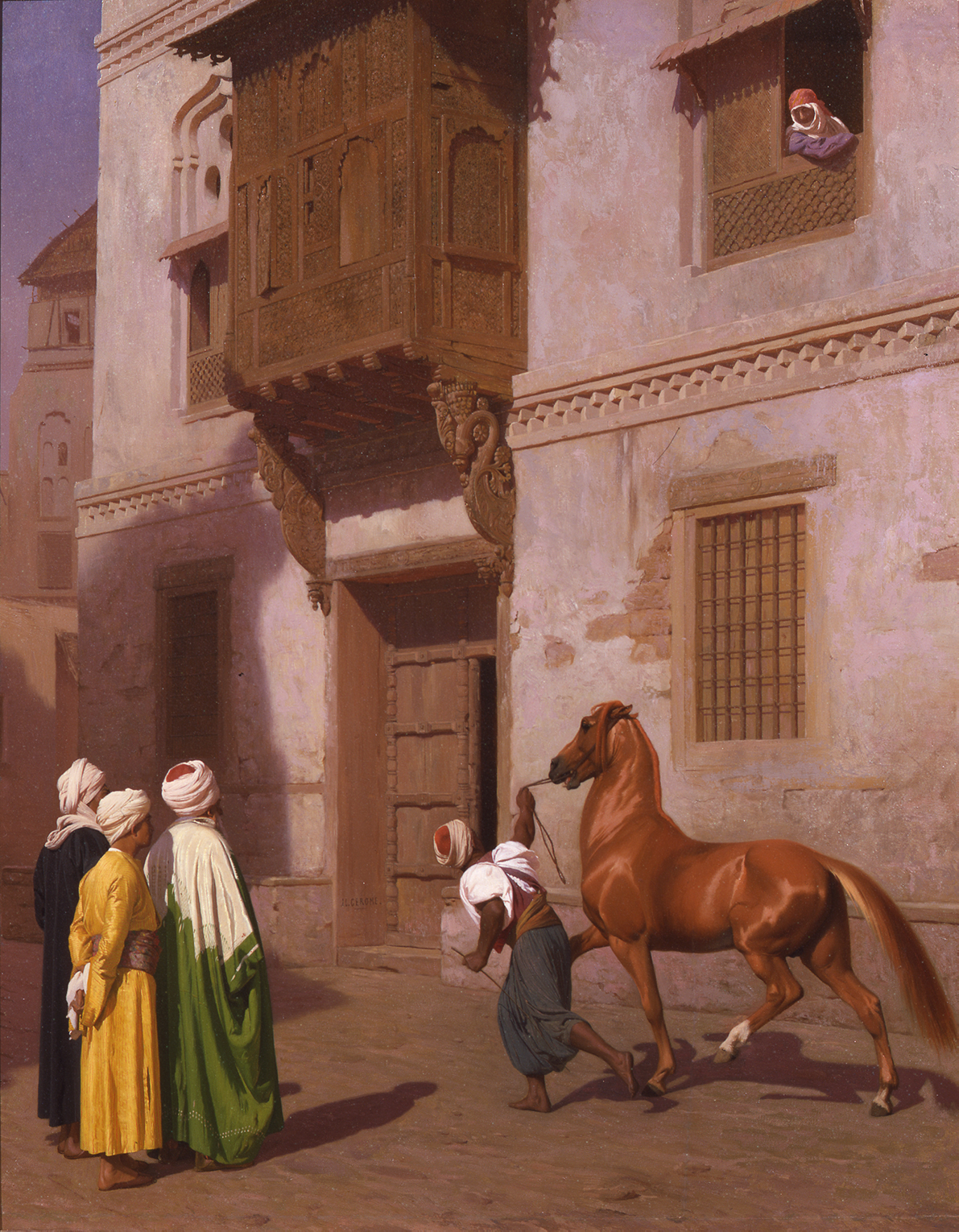
The Horse Market by Jean-Léon Gérôme, (1867)

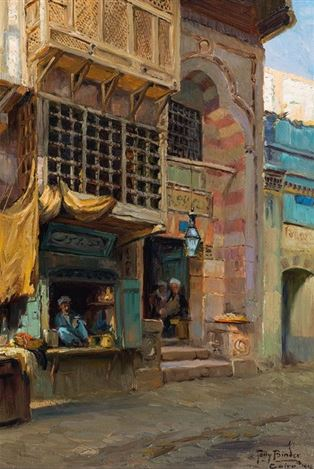
Street Scene in Cairo by Tony Binder, (1912)

== Current status ==
Use of the mashrabiya became widespread during the Ottoman period (1517–1805). However, by the late 19th century its use was in decline. The reasons for its decline are complex, including both cultural and practical considerations such as the emergence of modernism and the availability of new technologies and materials, the high cost of the labour-intensive work of producing lattice and concerns about fire danger.

In the second half of the 20th century, the use of vernacular architecture, including mashrabiya and badgir (windcatcher), have undergone a revival. Contemporary architects have recognised the environmental value of traditional designs as a means of providing natural and efficient solutions to cooling problems in hot climates.

The revival of vernacular architecture in the Middle East is due, in large part, to the work of the Egyptian architect, Hassan Fathy (1900–1989) and the Iraqi architect, Rifat Chadirji (1926–2020), both of whom championed the integration of traditional materials and designs and worked to reconcile tradition with contemporary needs.

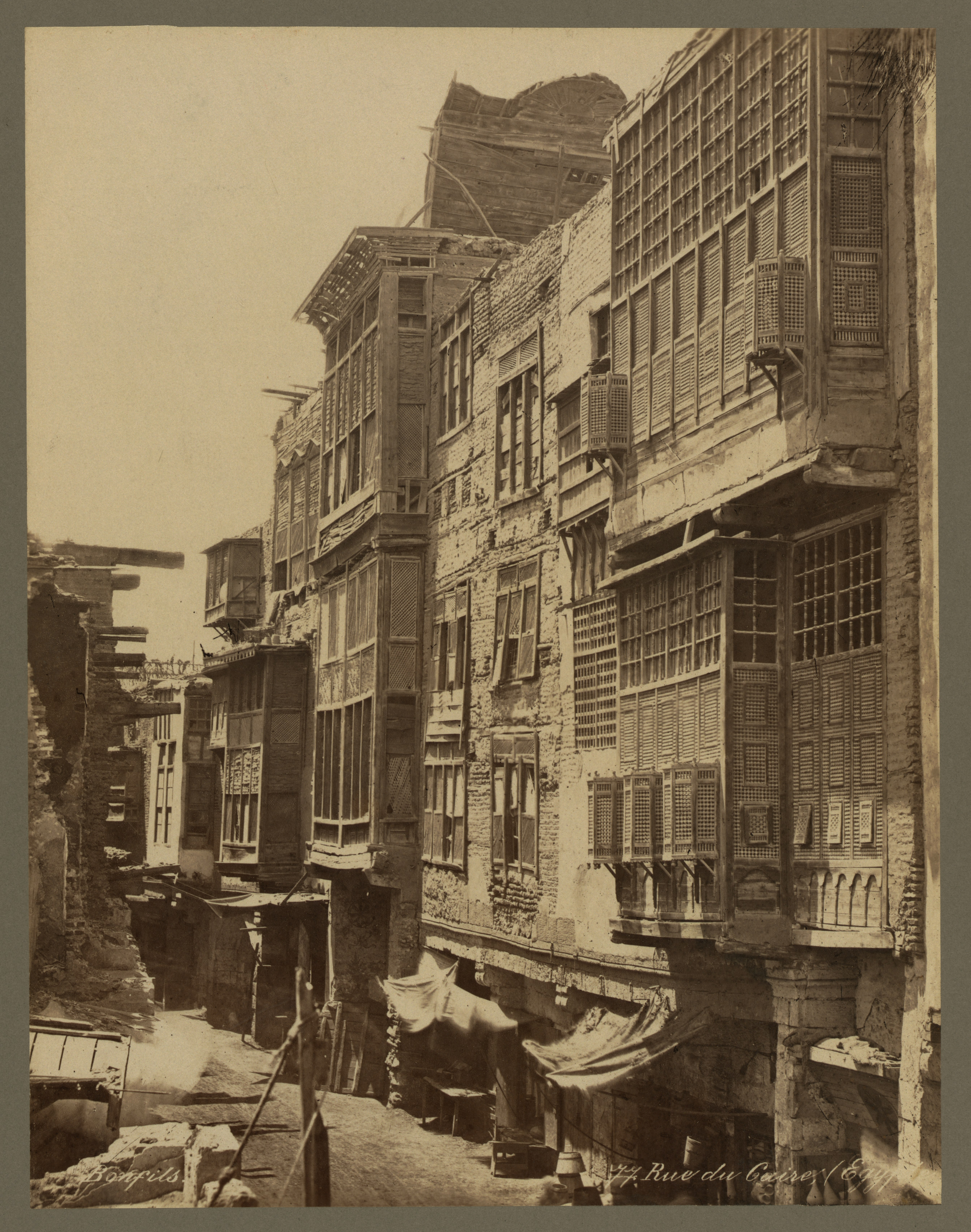
Cairo streetscape, showing prevalence of mashrabiya

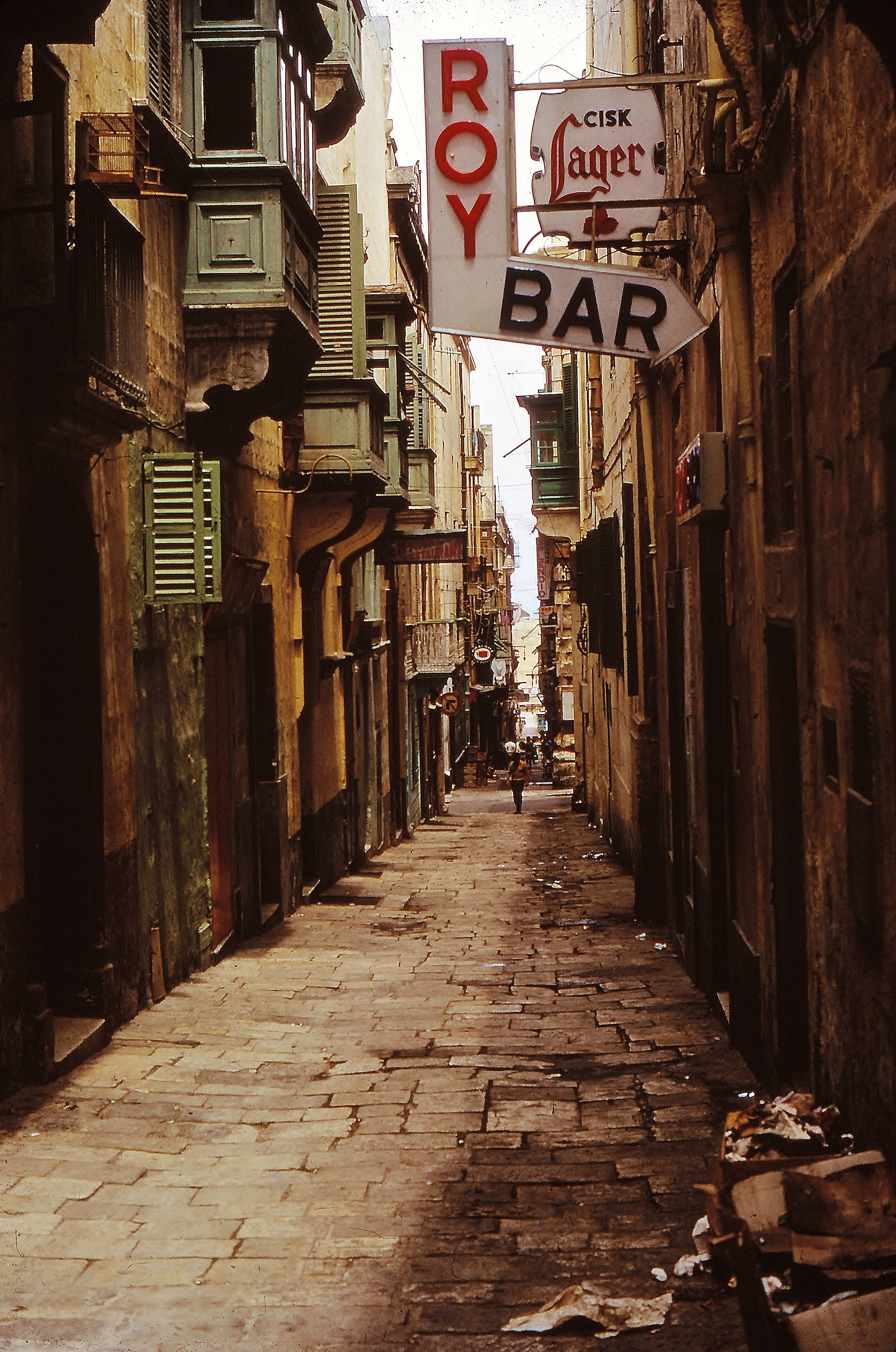
Street scene in Valletta, Malta showing mashrabiya, 1967

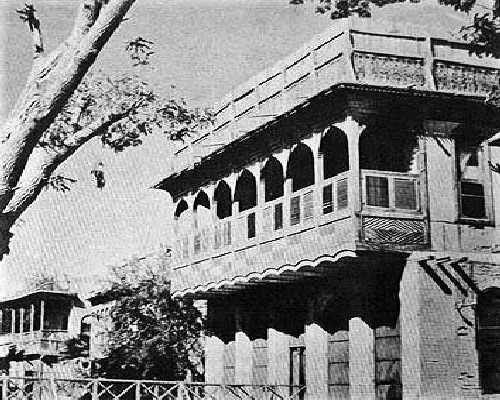
Street scene in Basra, Iraq, in the 1950s

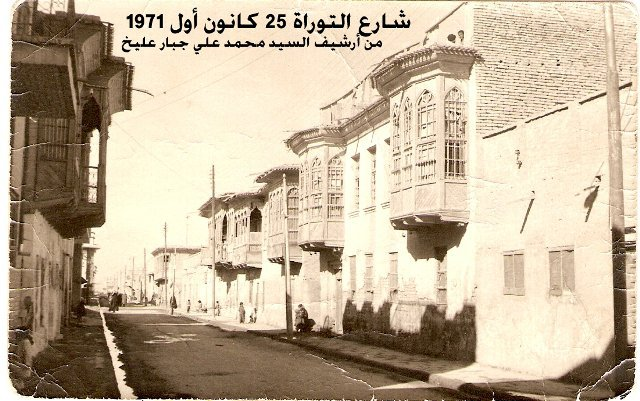
In Iraq, the balcony window is known as a shanasheel

== See also ==
- Al-Mashrabiya Building
- Jharokha (stone version)
- Brise soleil
- Arab World Institute
- Jali
- List of Historic Monuments in Cairo
- Lorna Selim – artist who produced hundreds of sketches of Baghdadi mashrabiya
- Rifat Chadirji – architect who sought to integrate traditional Iraqi elements into modern building design
- Samta Benyahia
- Vernacular architecture
- Terraced houses in Australia
