= Rushan (name) =

Rushan is a given name and surname. Notable people with the name include:

- Ahamed Rushan, Sri Lankan Photographer, Graphics Designer
- Rushan Abbas, Uyghur American activist
- Rushan Khasanov (born 1956), Russian football player
- Rushan Rafikov (born 1995), Russian ice hockey player
- Andre Rand (born Frank Rushan in 1944), American criminal
