= Ruşan =

- Municipality
- Location within Azerbaijan
- Coordinates: 40°48′20″N 48°00′33″E
- Country: Azerbaijan
- Rayon: Ismailli

Population
  - Total: 988
- Time zone: UTC+4 (AZT)
  - Summer (DST): UTC+5 (AZT)

Ruşan (also, Rushan) is a village and municipality in the Ismailli Rayon of Azerbaijan. It has a population of 988.
