= Balcony =

Platform projecting from the wall of a building

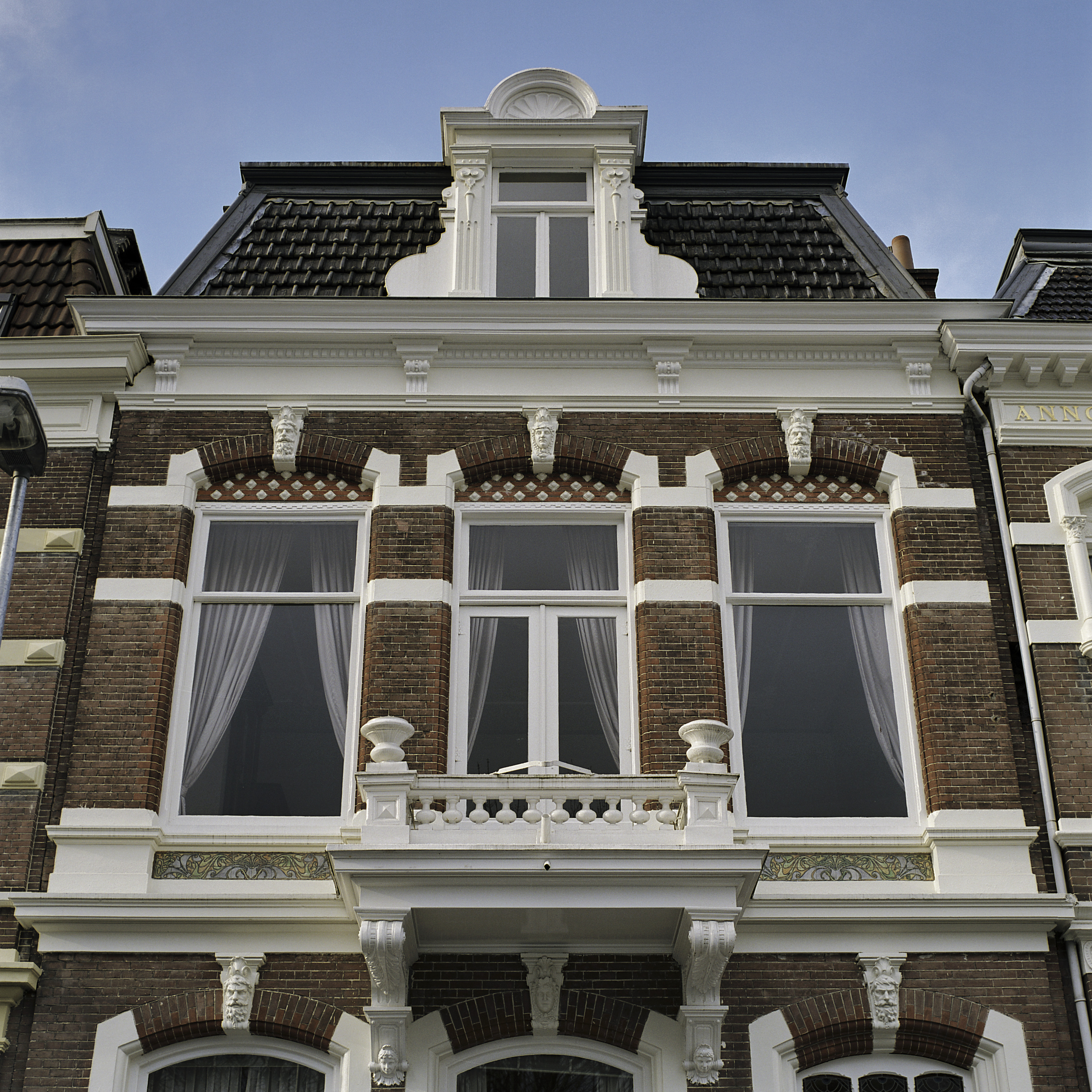
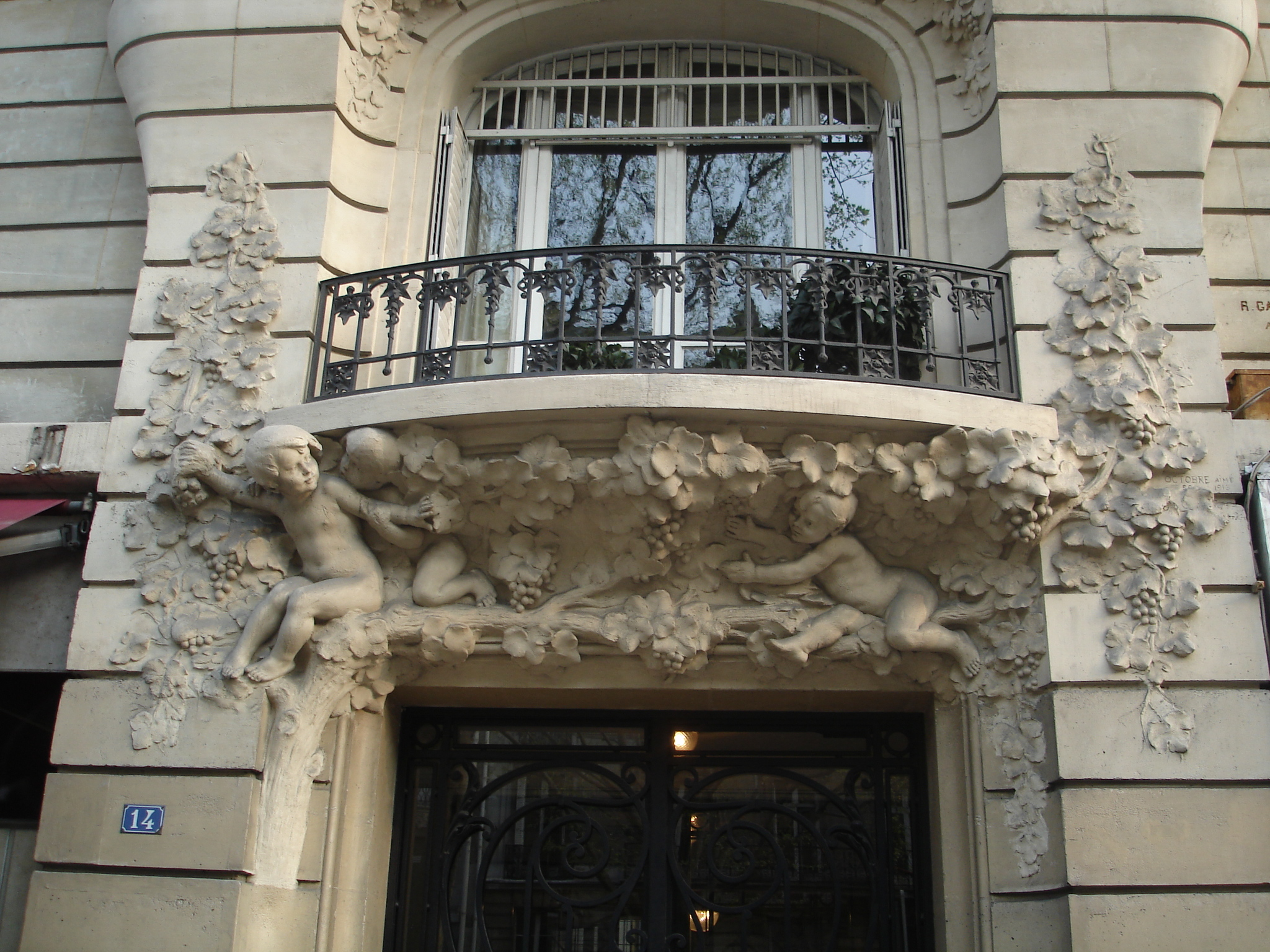
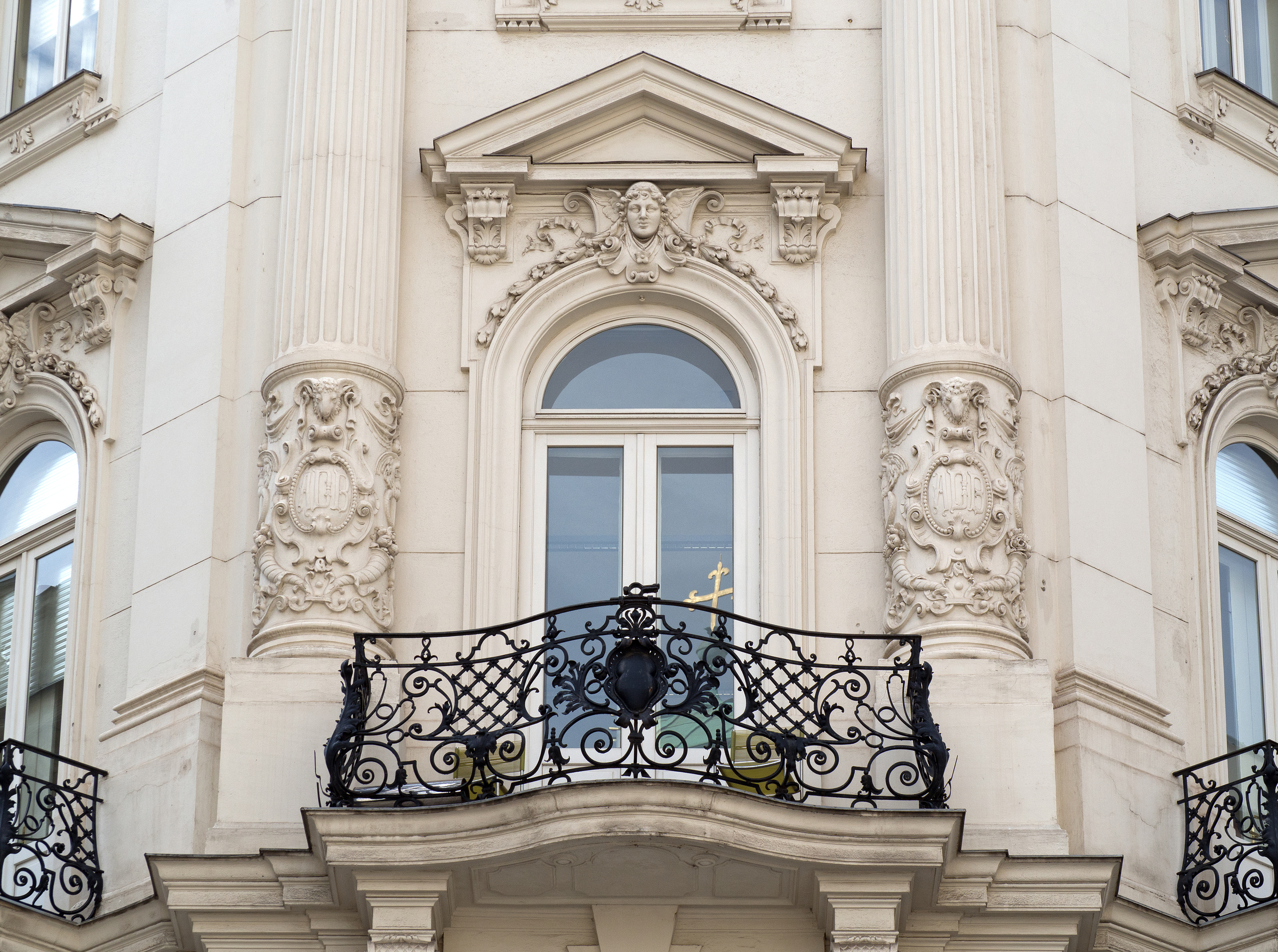
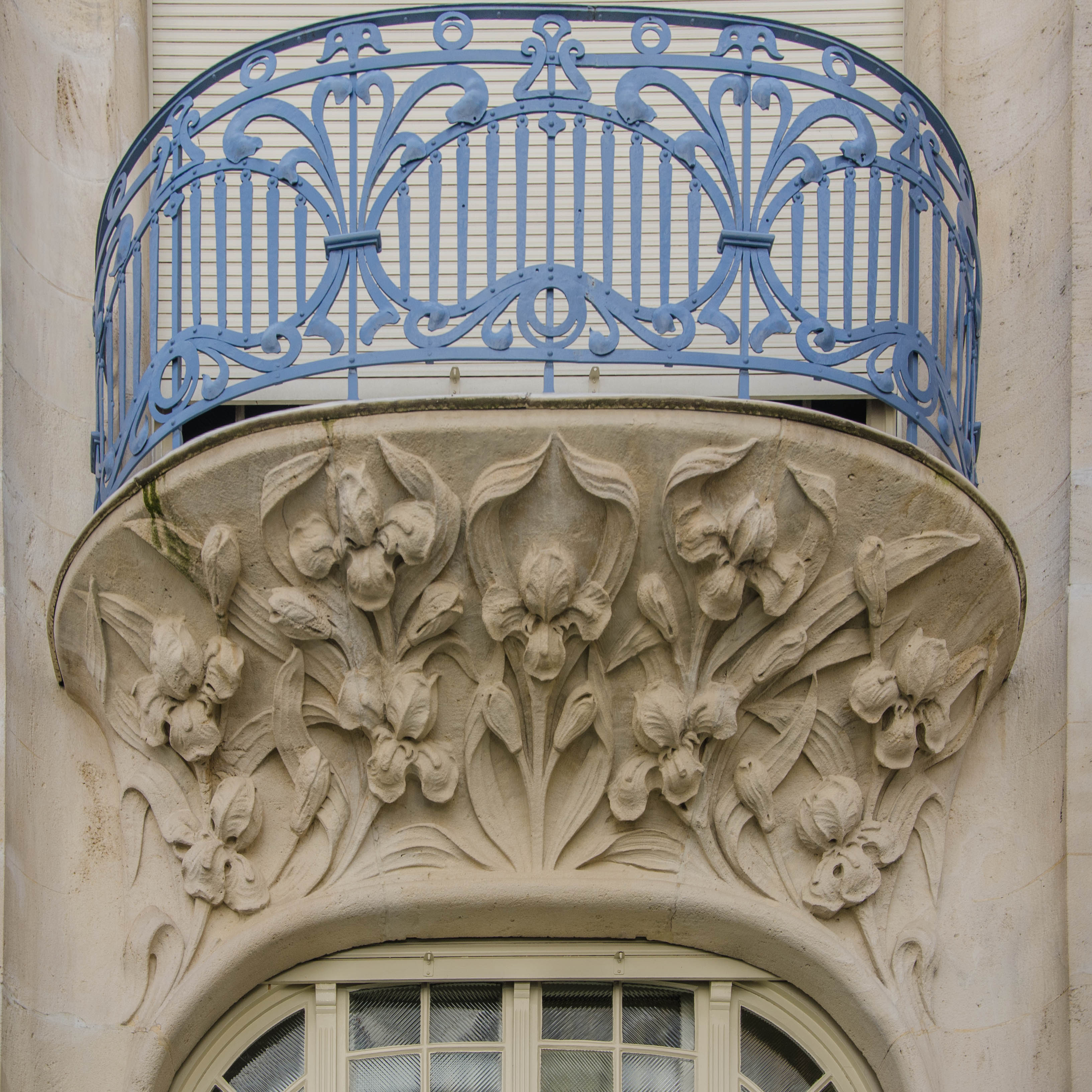
Various styles of balconies

A balcony (from Italian: balcone, "scaffold") is a platform that typically projects from the wall of a building, supported by columns or console brackets, and enclosed with a balustrade, usually above the ground floor. They are commonly found on multi-level houses, apartments and buildings.

== Types ==
Cantilever balconies are a type of balcony where there is no visible support structure underneath, so it appears to float. Recessed balconies sit within the boundary of a building's facade, so are the least exposed type of balcony. Stacked balconies are attached to a buildings facade, whilst being supported by pillars beneath. The traditional Maltese balcony is a wooden, closed balcony projecting from a wall.

A Juliet balcony does not protrude out of the building. It is usually part of an upper floor, with a balustrade only at the front, resembling a small loggia. A modern Juliet balcony often involves a metal barrier placed in front of a high window that can be opened. Juliet balconies are named after William Shakespeare's Juliet, from Romeo and Juliet. Various types of balcony have been used in this famous scene, including the "balcony of Juliet" at Villa Capuleti in Verona which is not a Juliet balcony.

A French balcony is a false balcony, with doors that open to a railing with a view of the courtyard or the surrounding scenery below.

== Functions ==
Balconies provide an area of outside space. They can help to provide a building with light and ventilation. In addition to functioning as an outdoor space for a dwelling unit, balconies can also play a secondary role in building sustainability and indoor environmental quality. Balconies have been shown to provide an overhang effect that helps prevent interior overheating by reducing solar gain, and may also have benefits in terms of reducing noise. Balconies are part of the sculptural shape of the building allowing for irregular facades without the cost of irregular internal structures.

Sometimes balconies are adapted for ceremonial purposes, e.g. that of St. Peter's Basilica at Rome, when the newly elected pope gives his blessing urbi et orbi after the conclave. Balconies have been an important aspect of theatre architecture for centuries, inspired by ancient Roman and Greek civilisations, who included raised seating designs. Balconies gained prominence in the European renaissance, becoming synonymous with aristocratic and royal spectators.

== Examples ==
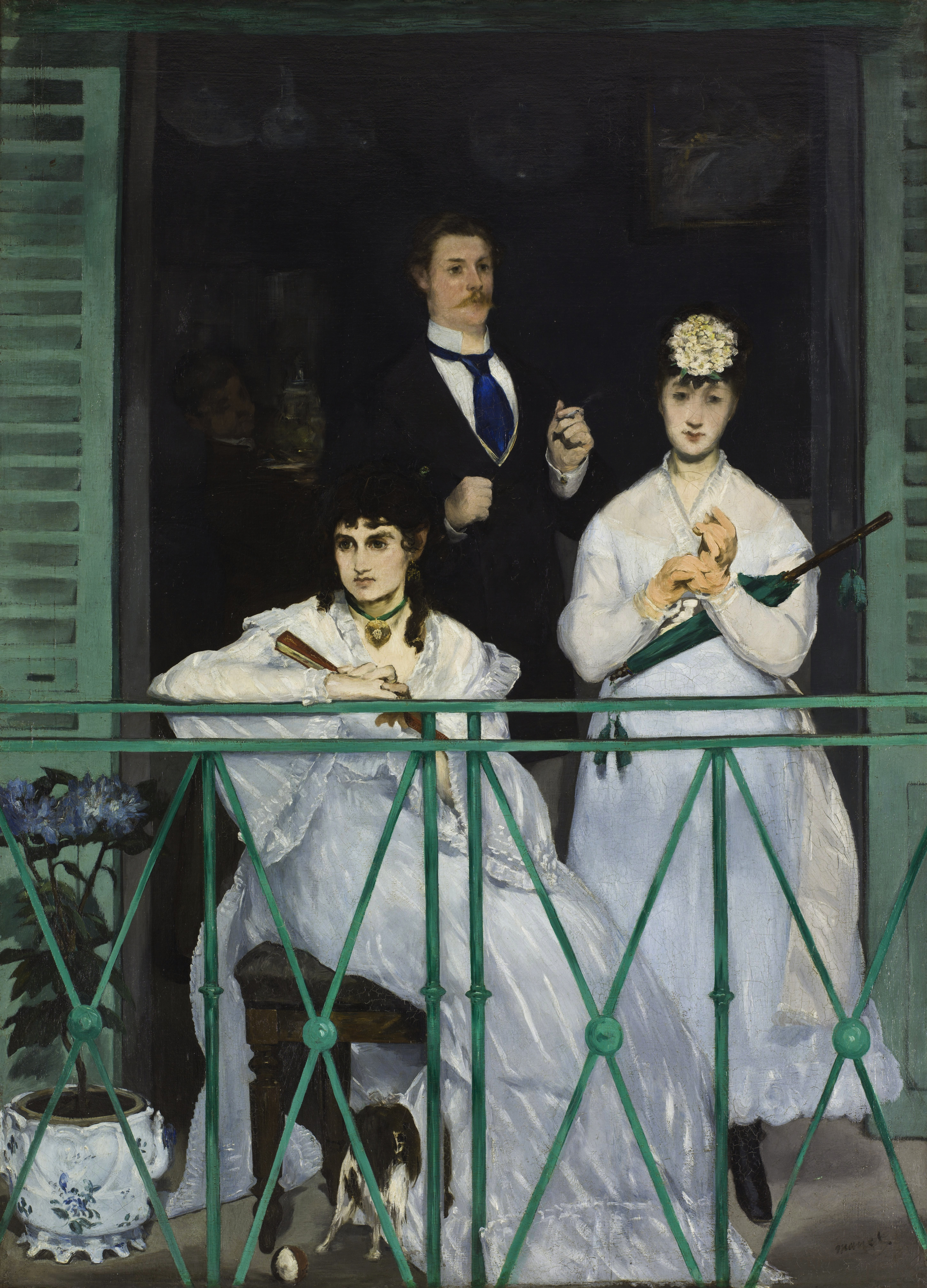
Édouard Manet: Le balcon

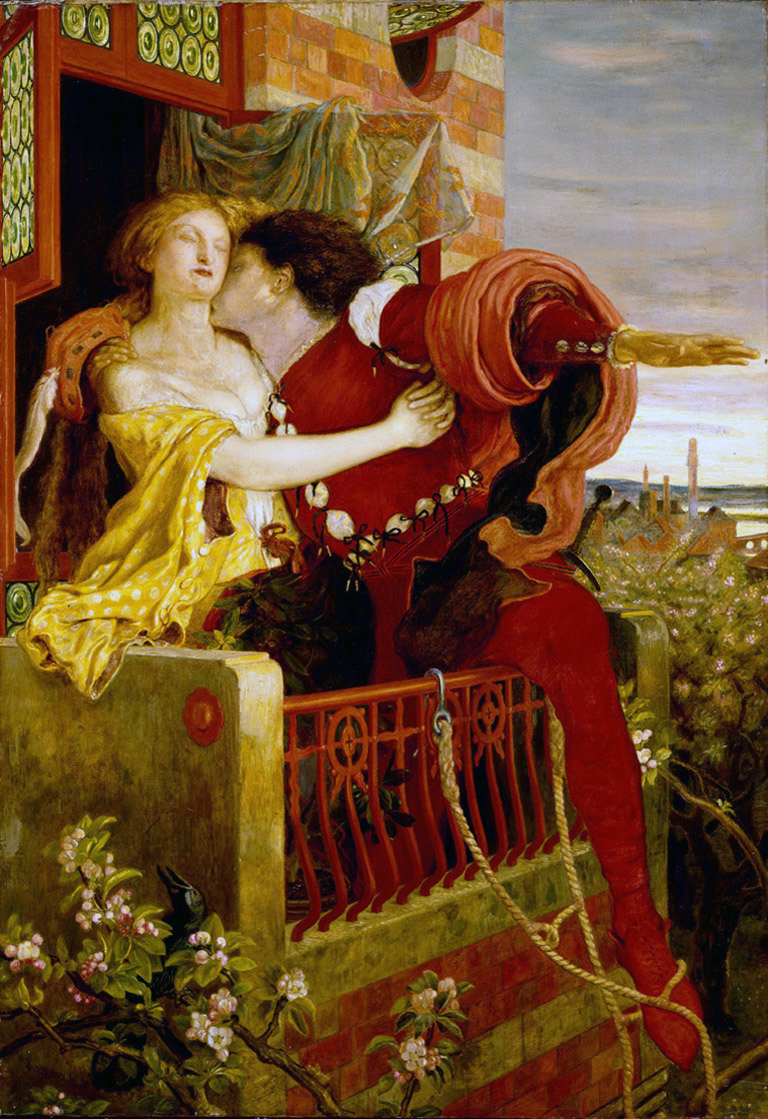
Ford Madox Brown, the balcony scene from Romeo and Juliet

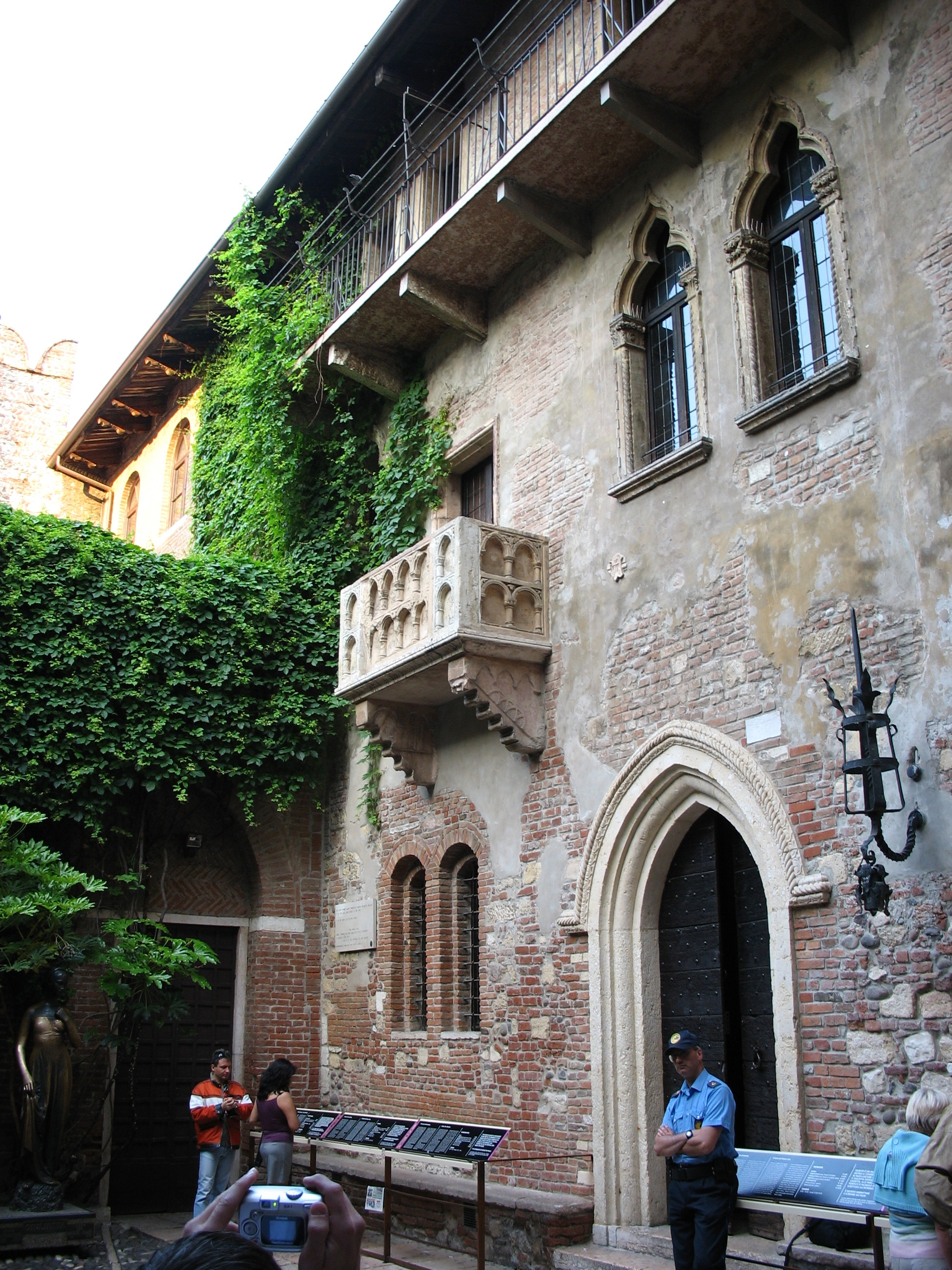
The balcony of Juliet at Villa Capuleti in Verona

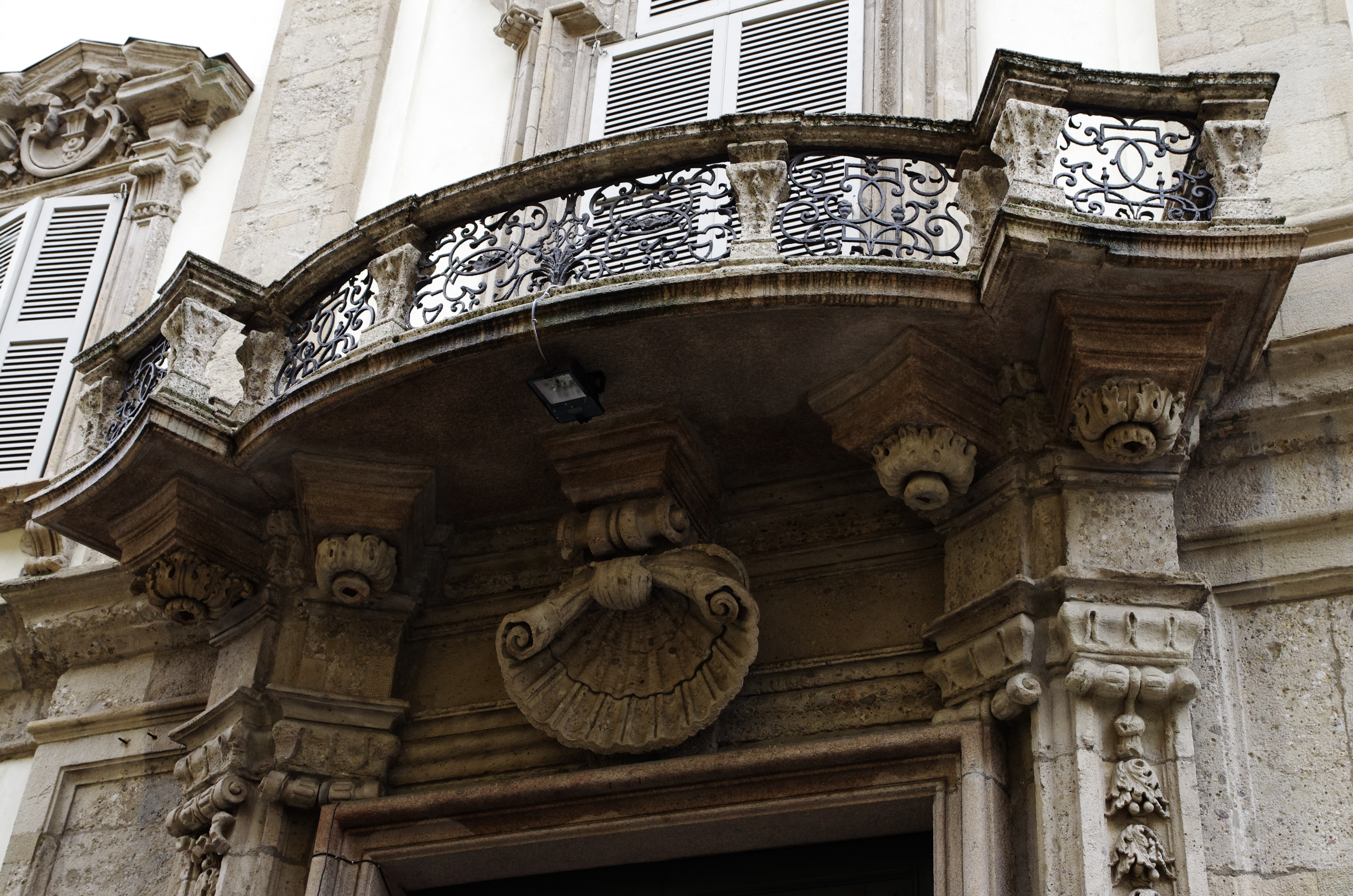
Palazzo Cusani in Milan (Italy)

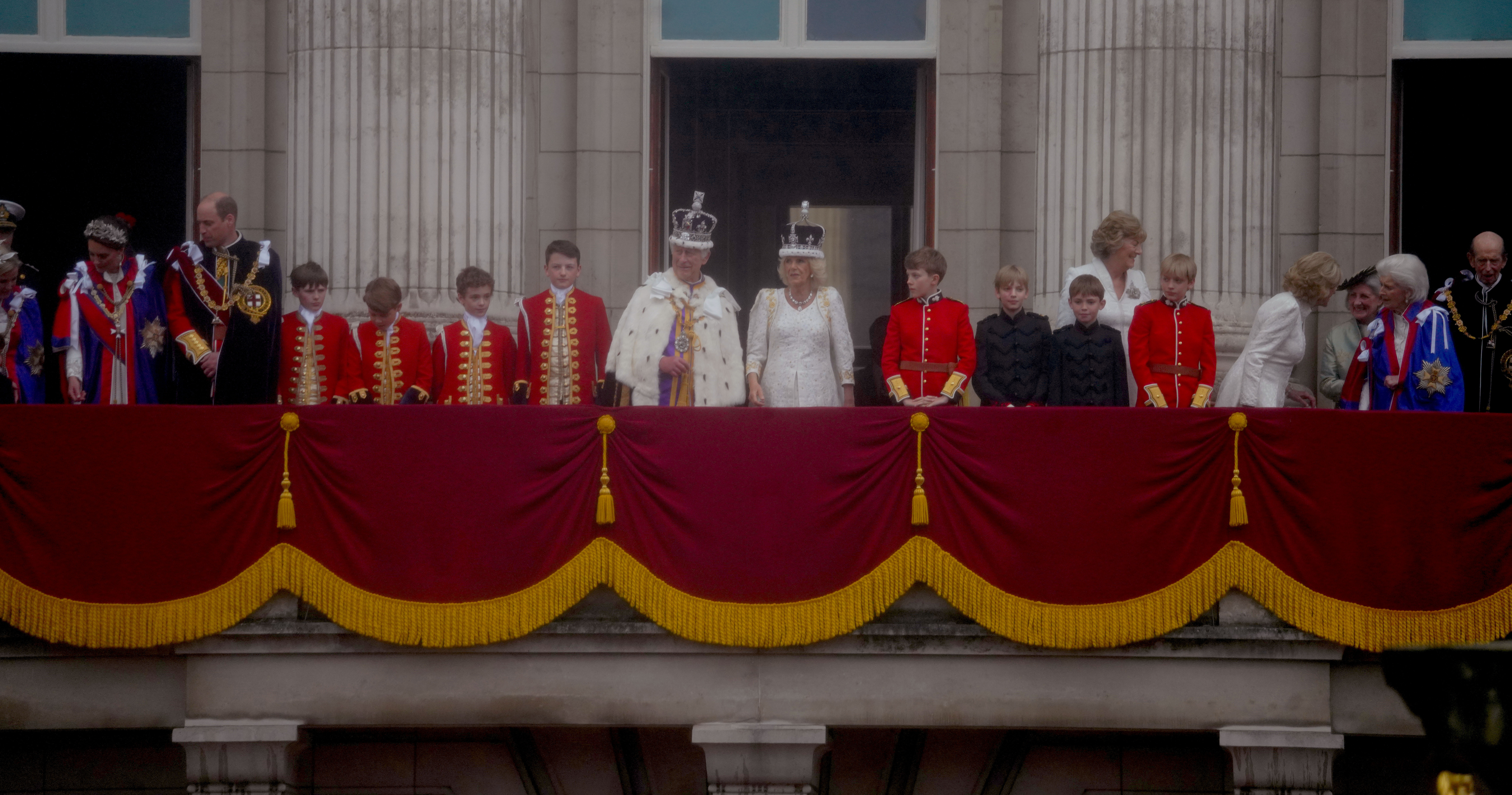
Members of the British royal family on the East Front Balcony at Buckingham Palace, 2023
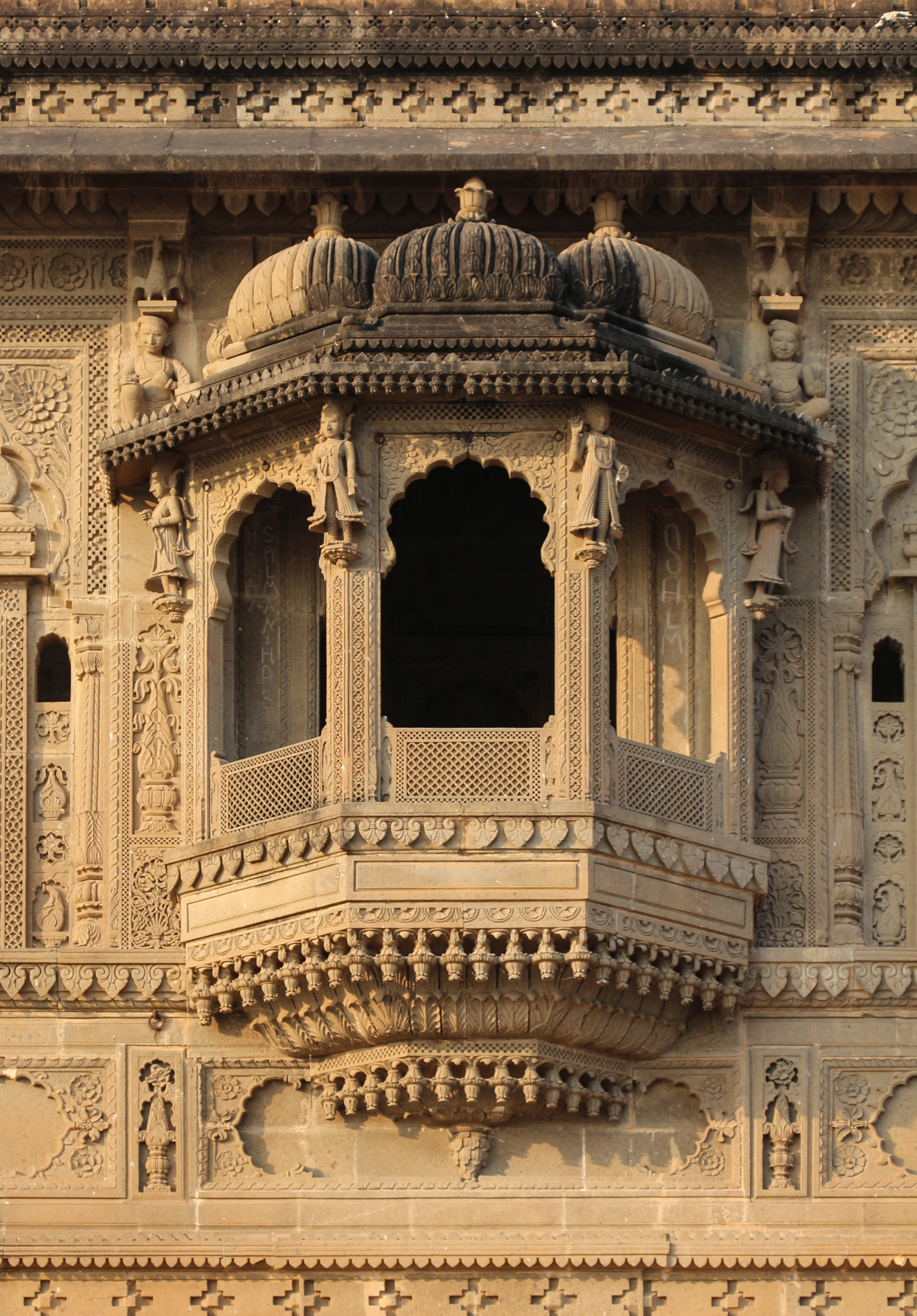
Indian balcony of the Maheshwar Fort, Maheshwar, India

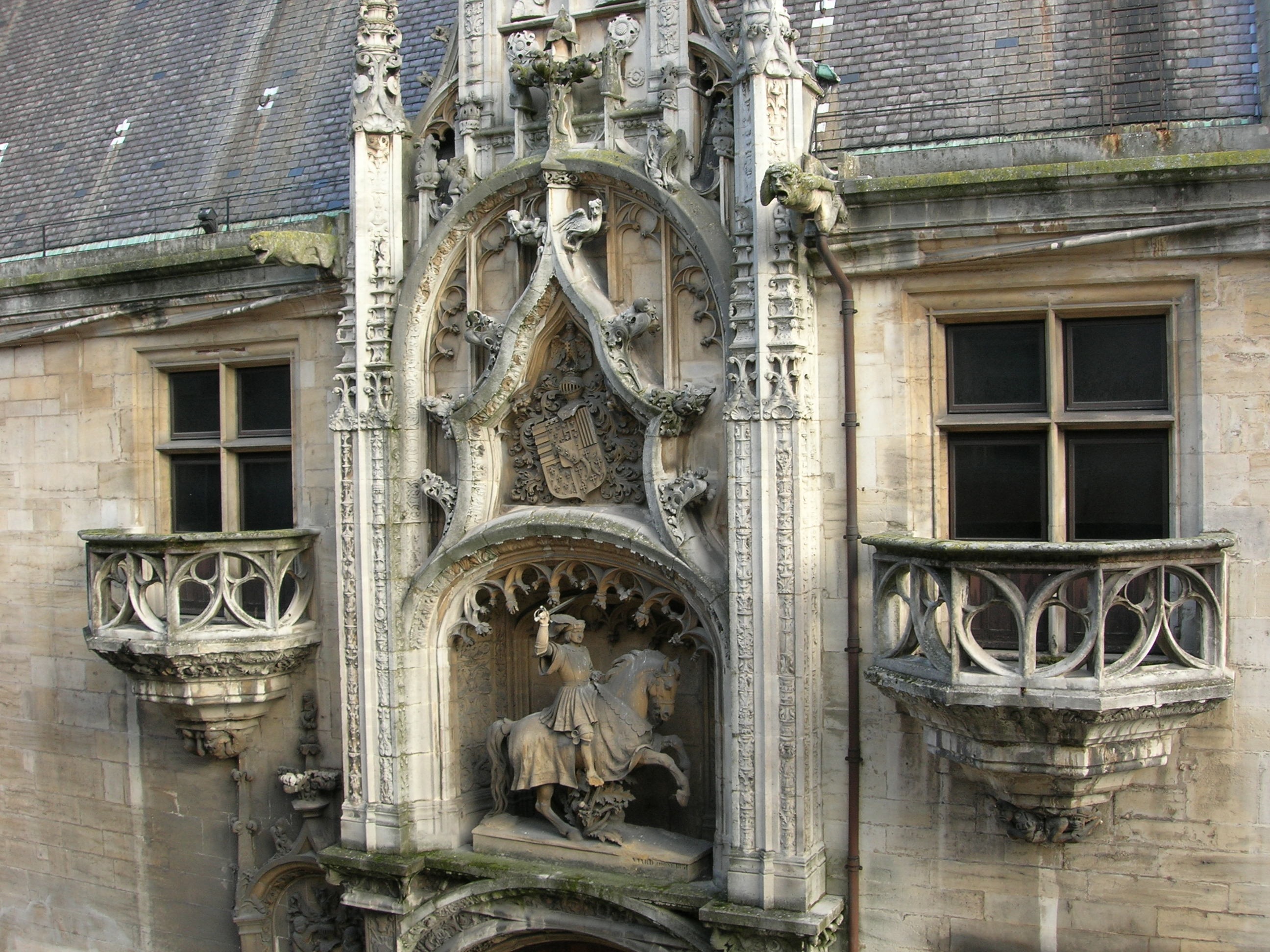
Gothic balconies of the Palace of the Dukes of Lorraine, Nancy, France

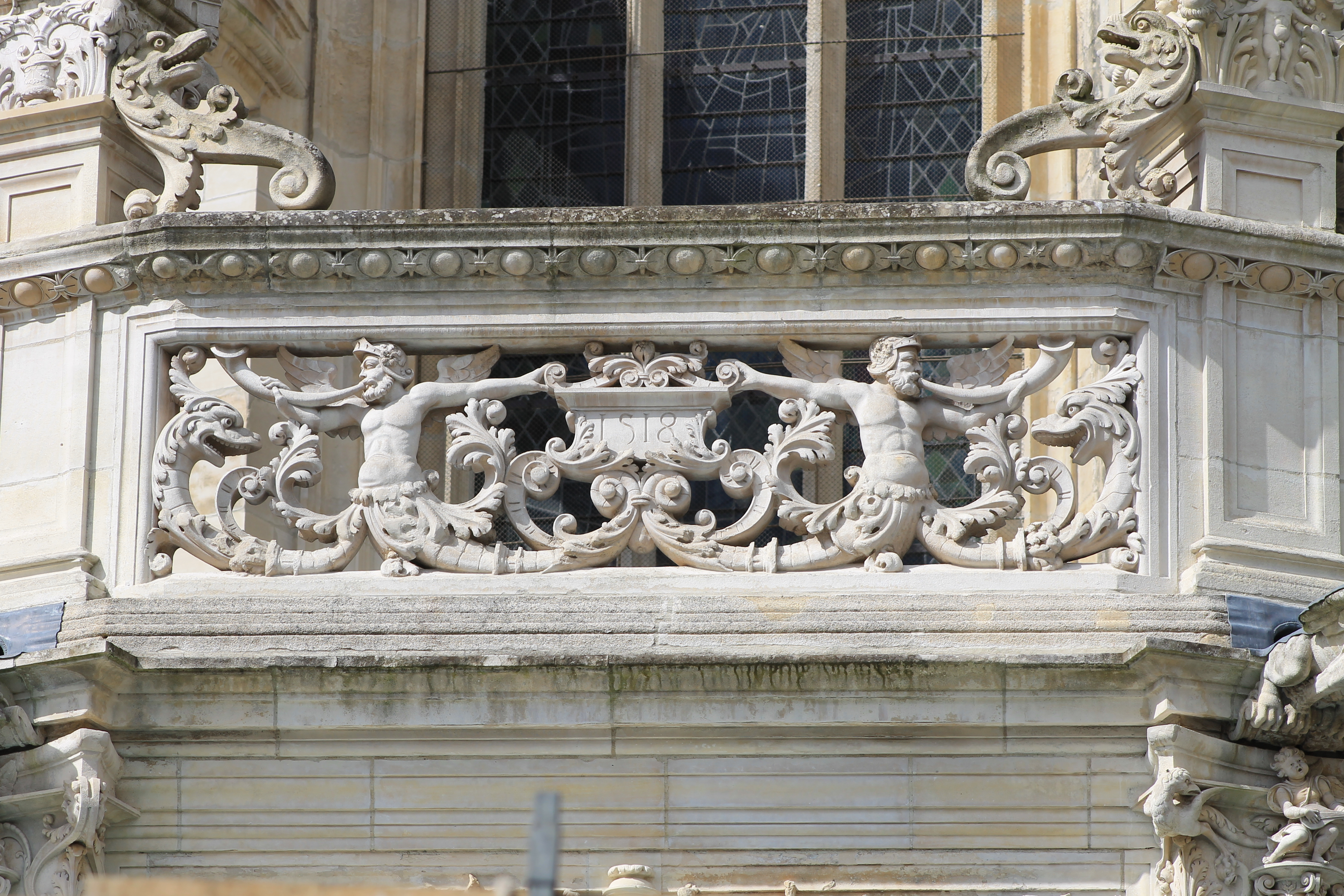
Renaissance balcony of the Church of Saint-Pierre, Caen, France

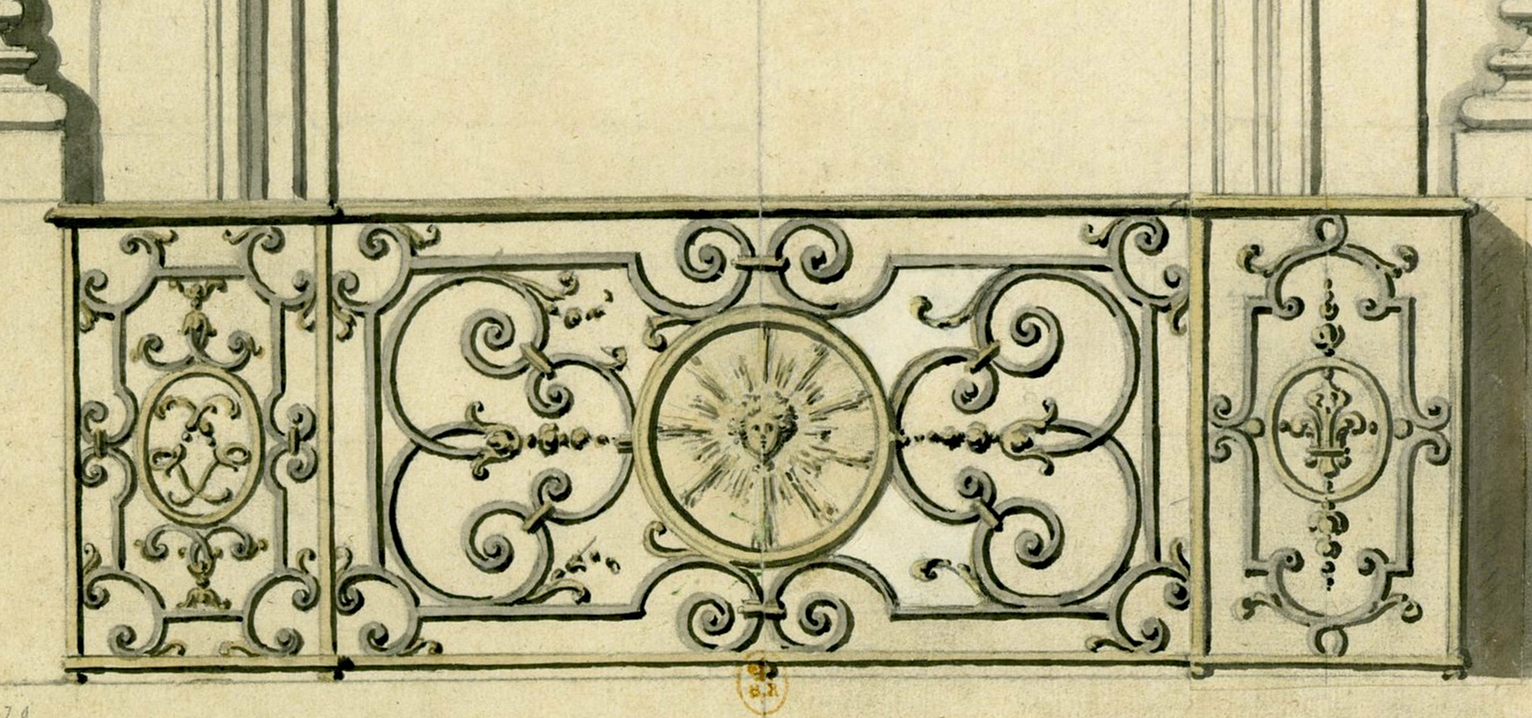
Baroque balcony design of the Hôtel de Boullongne, Paris

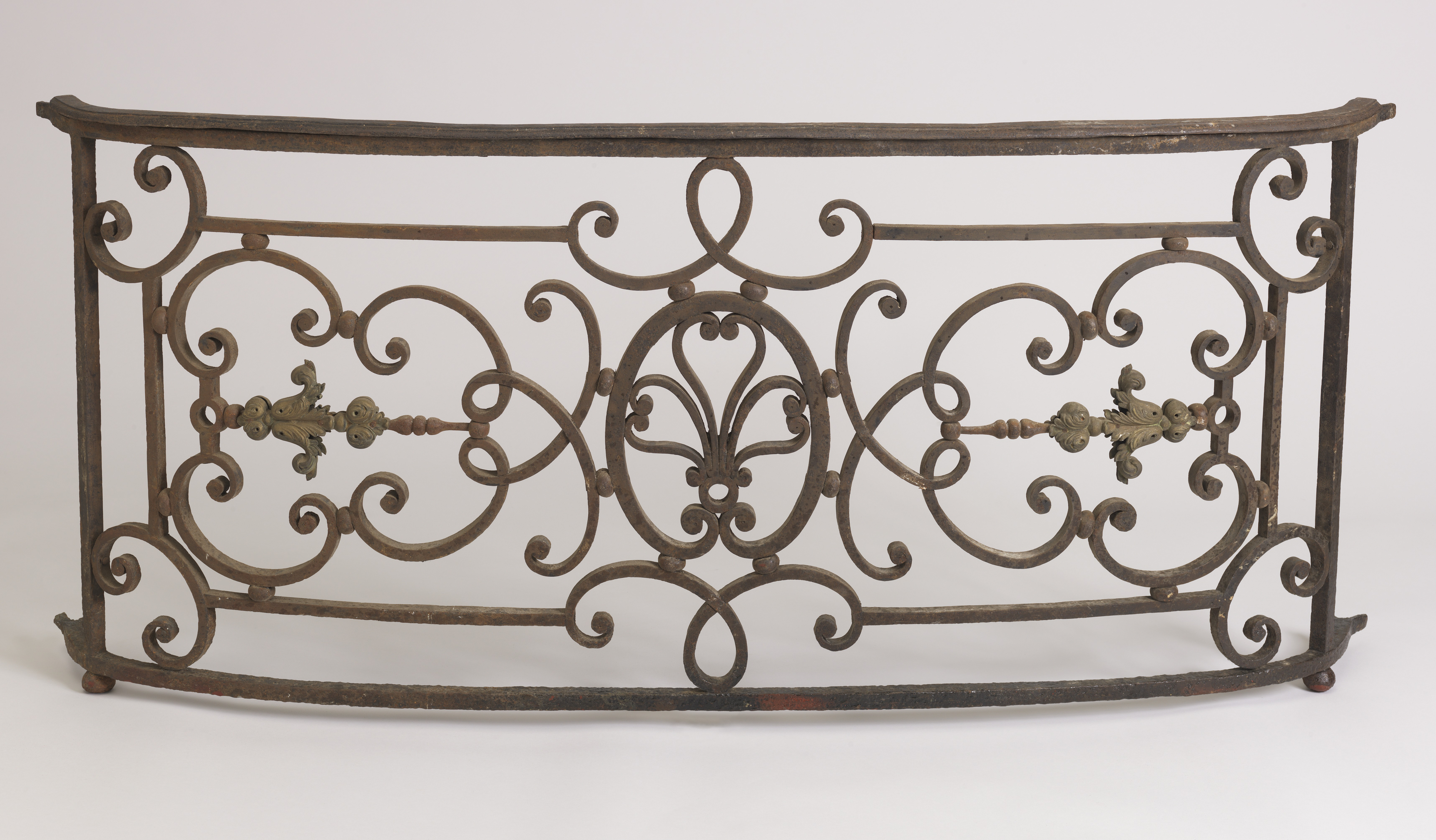
Rococo balcony in the Cooper–Hewitt, Smithsonian Design Museum, New York City

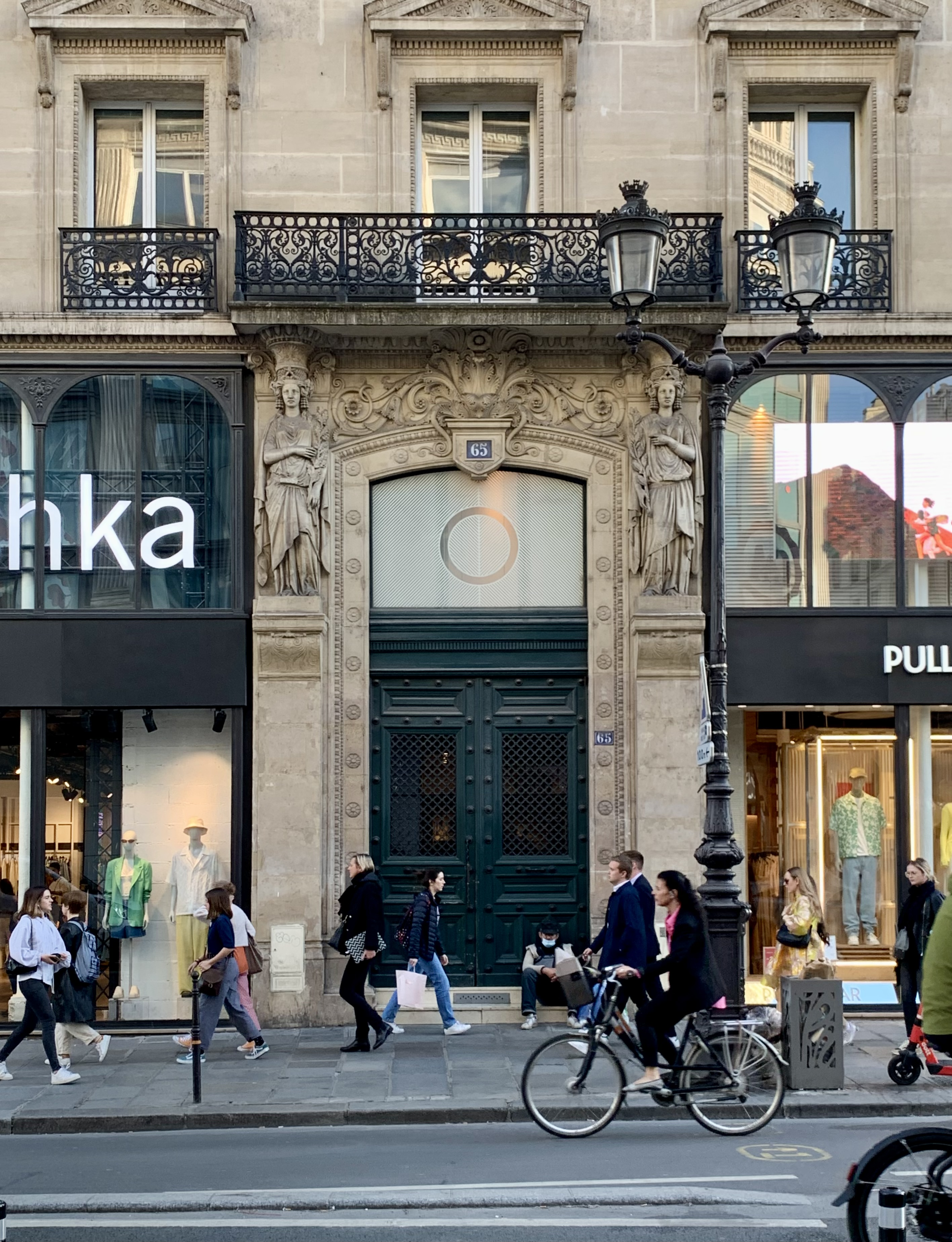
Neoclassical balcony of building no. 65 on Rue de Rivoli in Paris

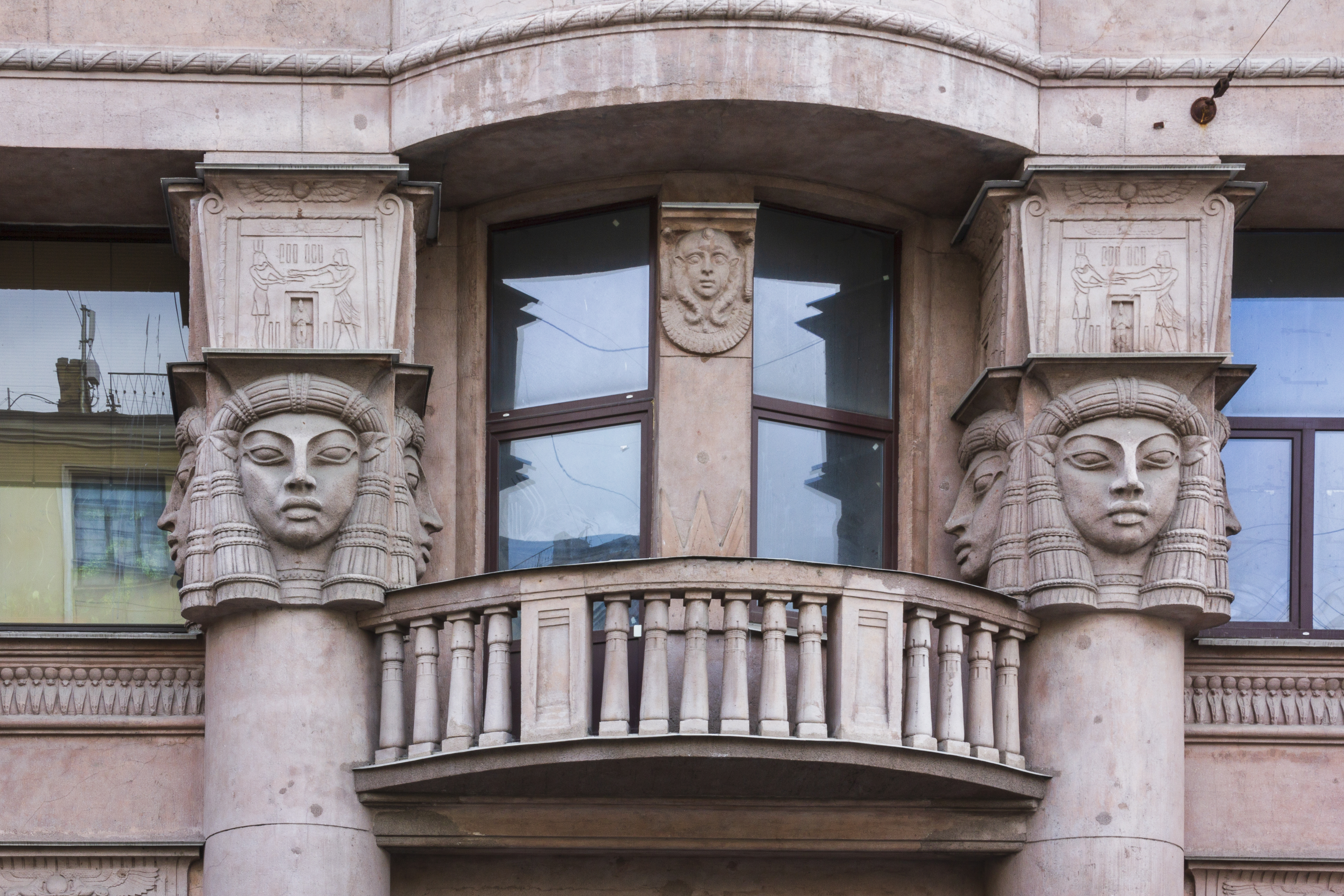
Egyptian Revival balcony in Saint Petersburg, Russia

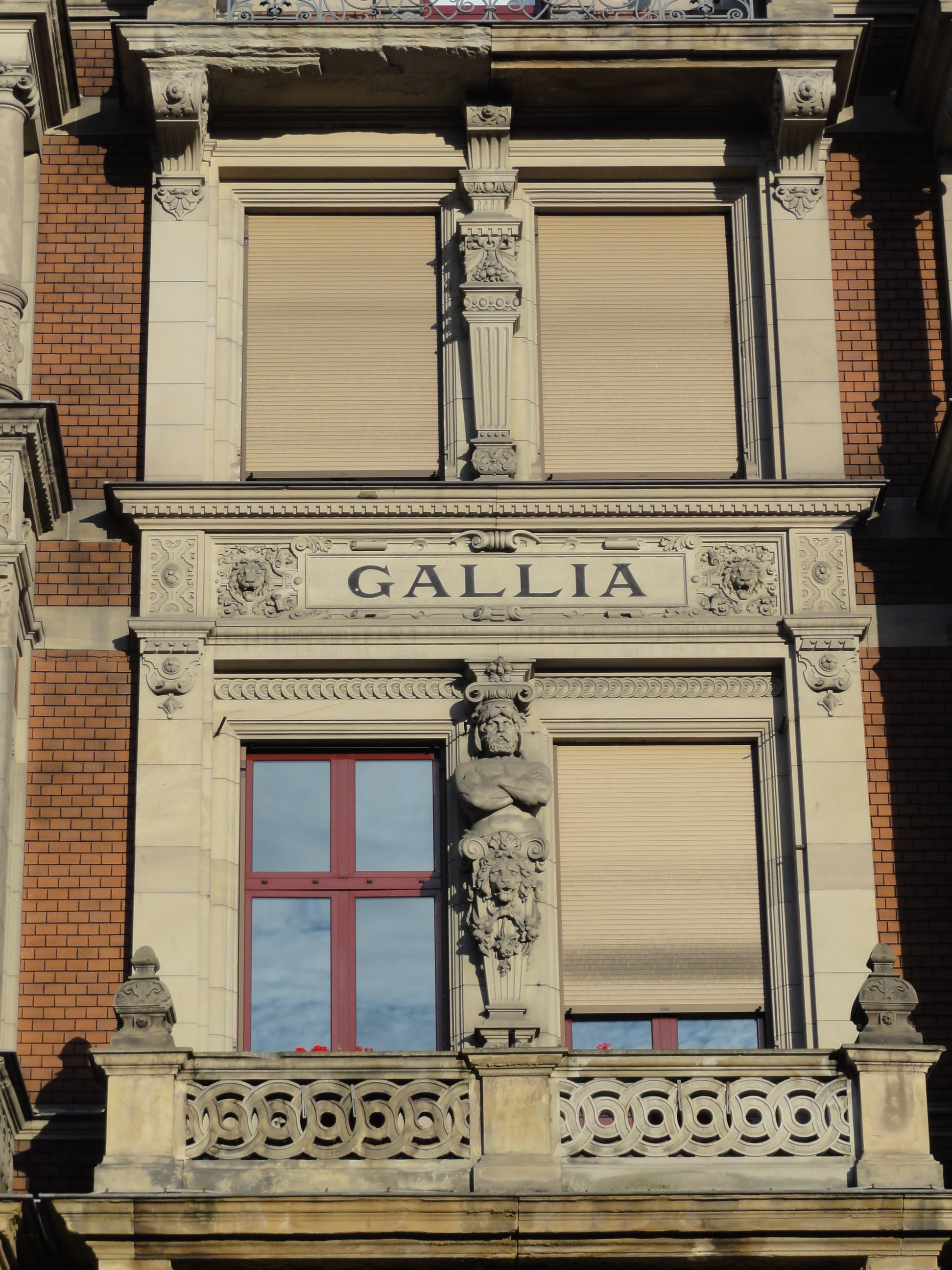
Renaissance Revival balcony in Strasbourg, France

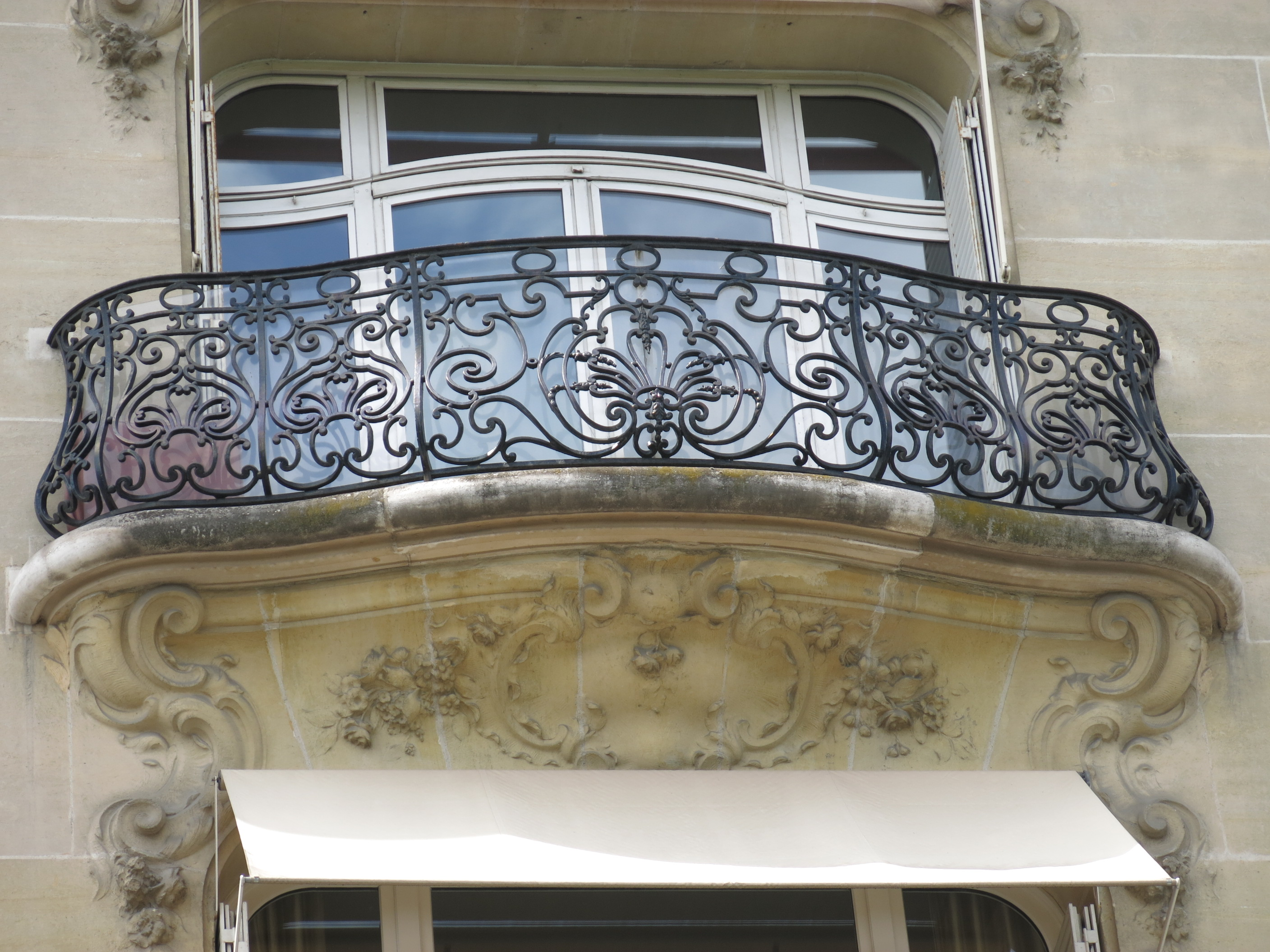
Rococo Revival balcony of building no. 38 bis on Rue Fabert, Paris

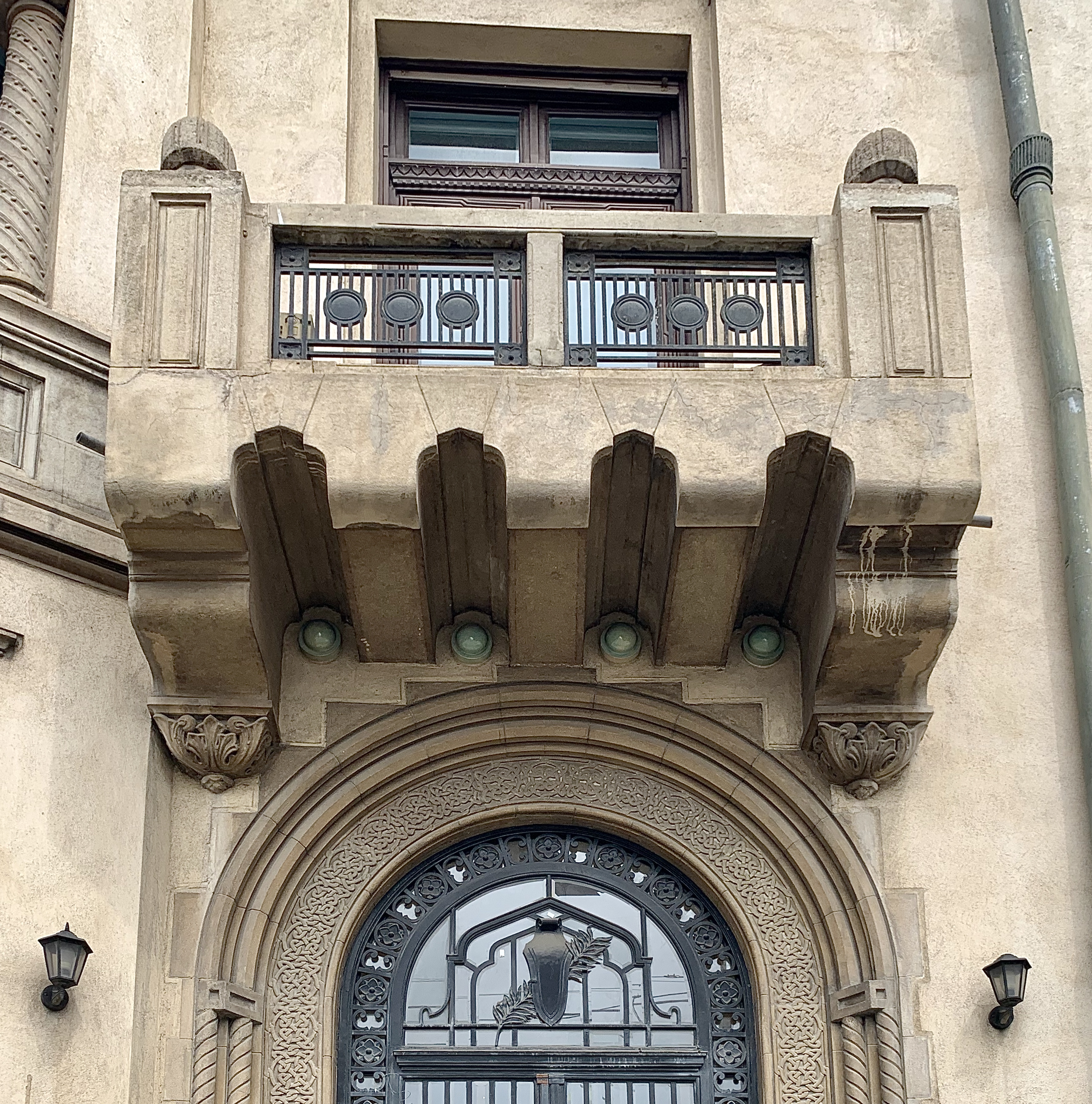
Romanian Revival balcony of the Gheorghe Petrașcu House in the Roman Square, Bucharest, Romania

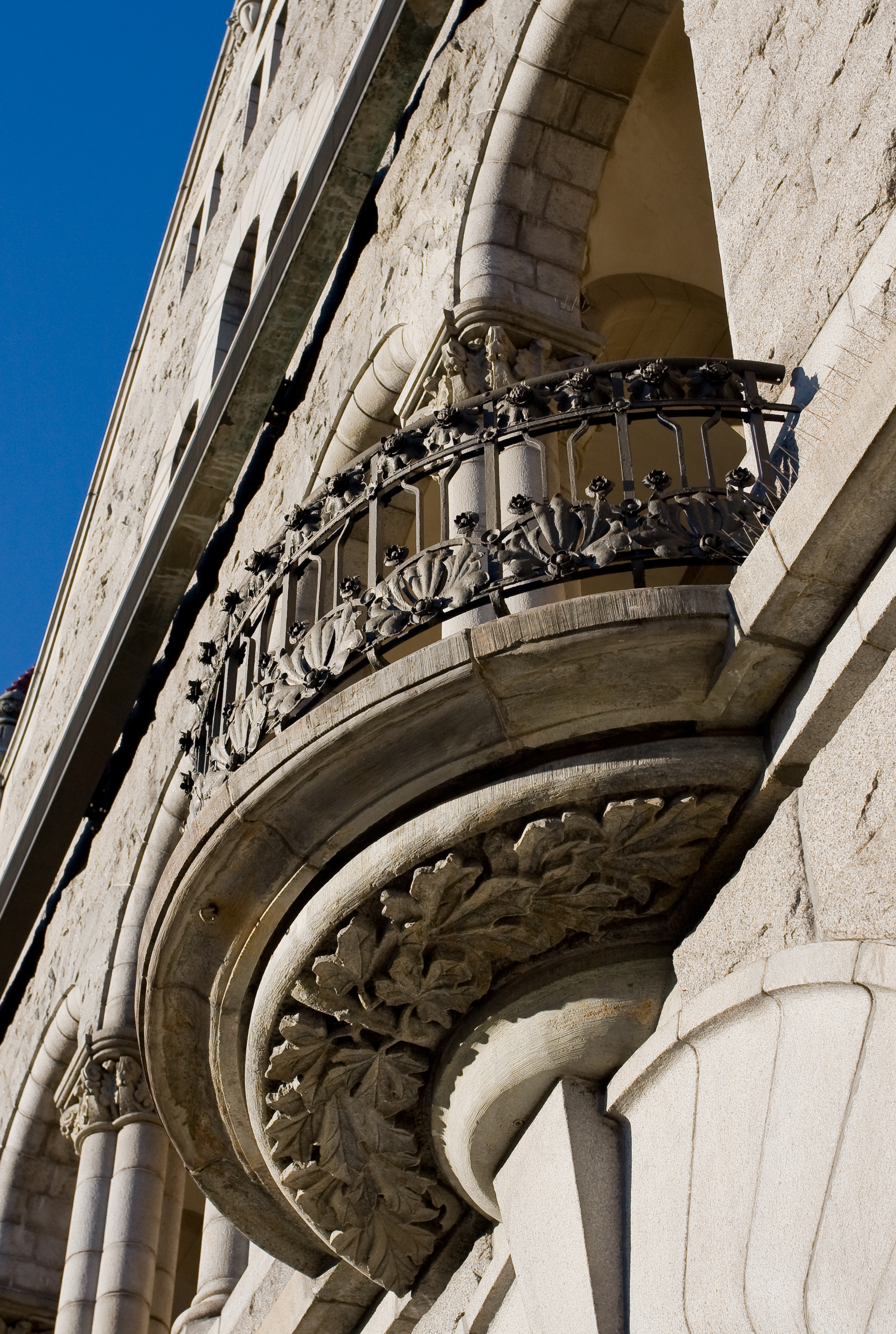
National romantic balcony of the Finnish National Theatre, Helsinki, Finland

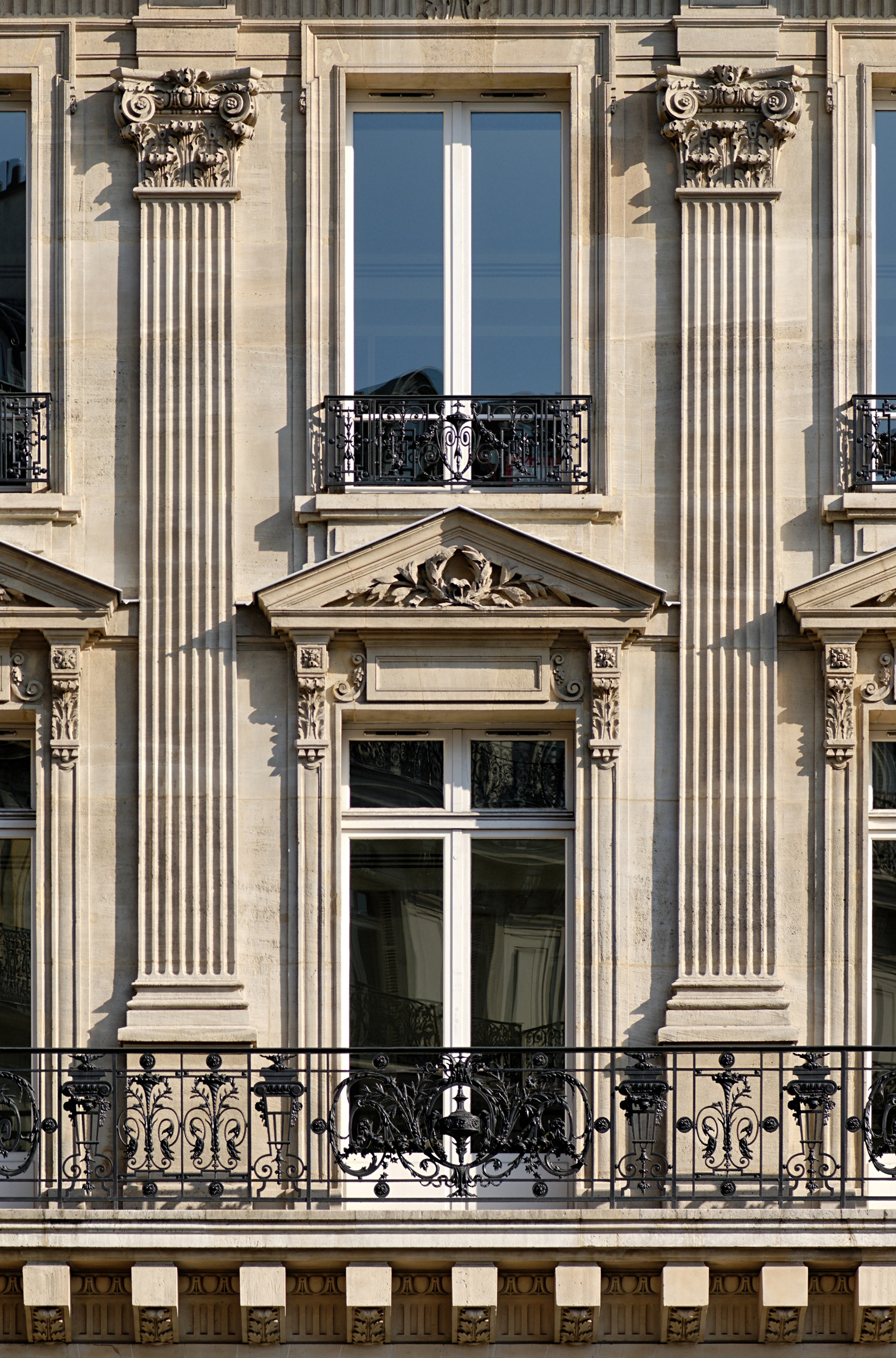
Beaux-Arts balcony of building no. 8 on Avenue de l'Opéra, Paris

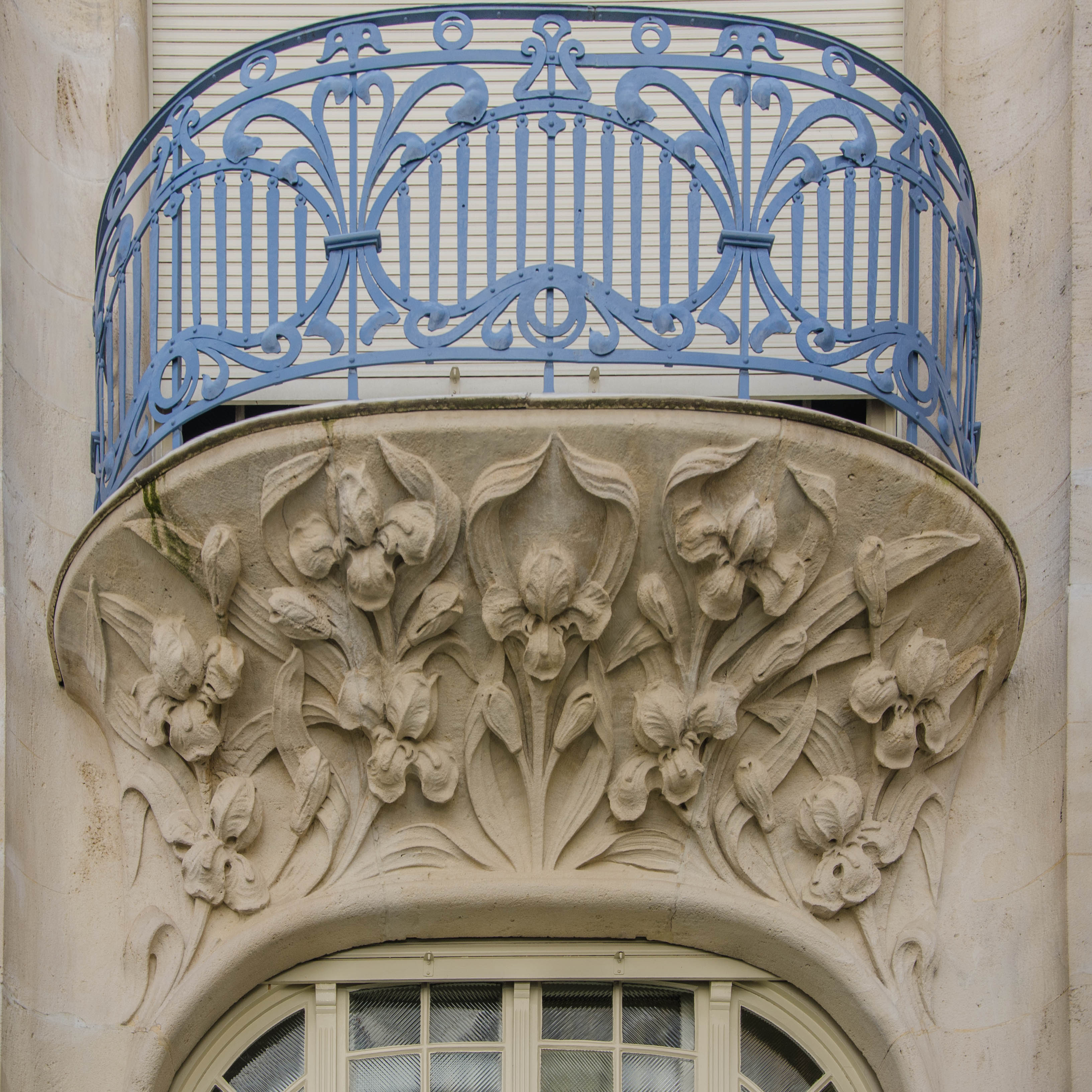
Art Nouveau balcony with a relief under it, on the façade of the Hôtel Brion from Strasbourg, France

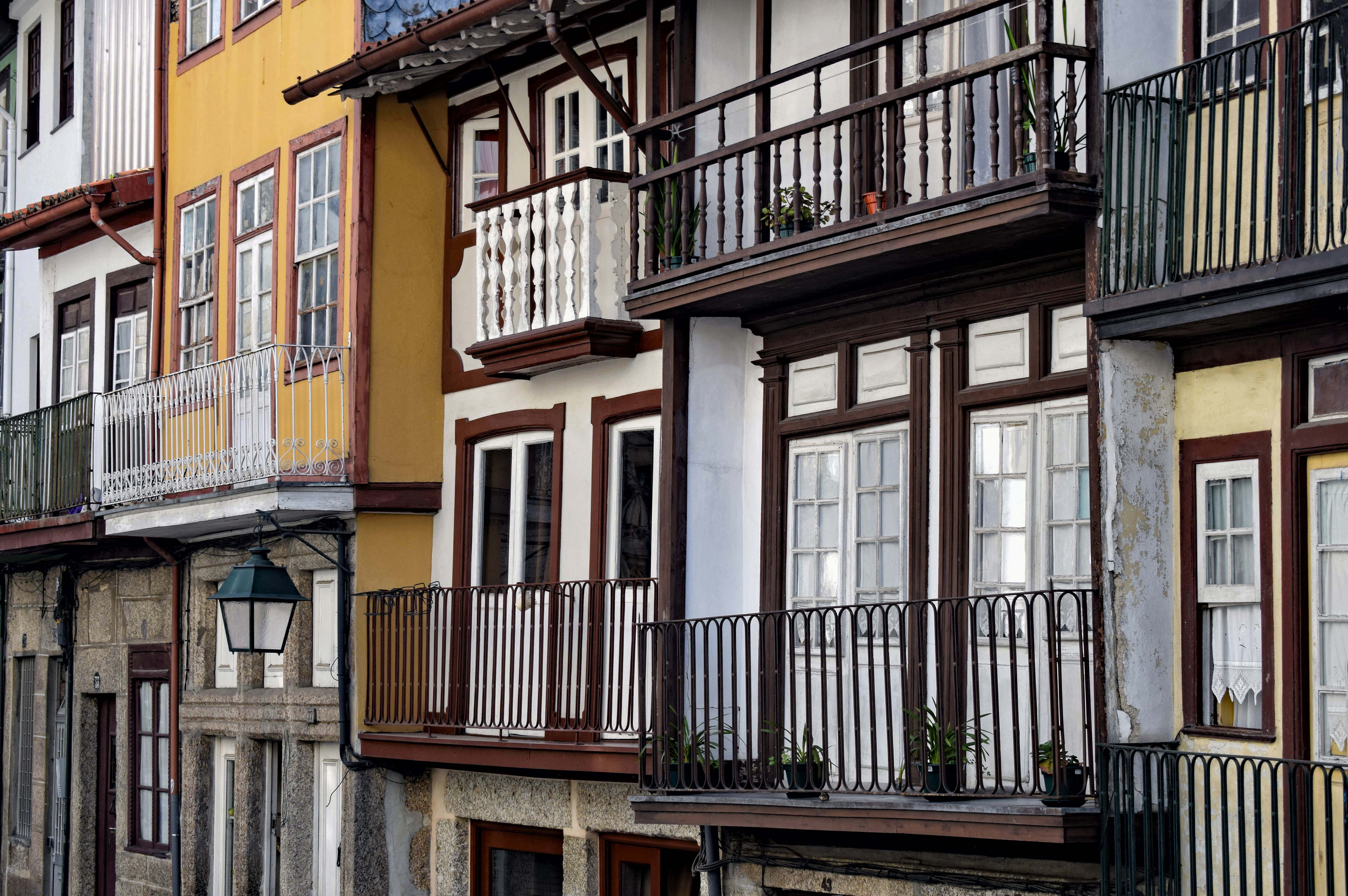
Balconies on the city (UNESCO World Heritage Site) of Guimarães, Portugal

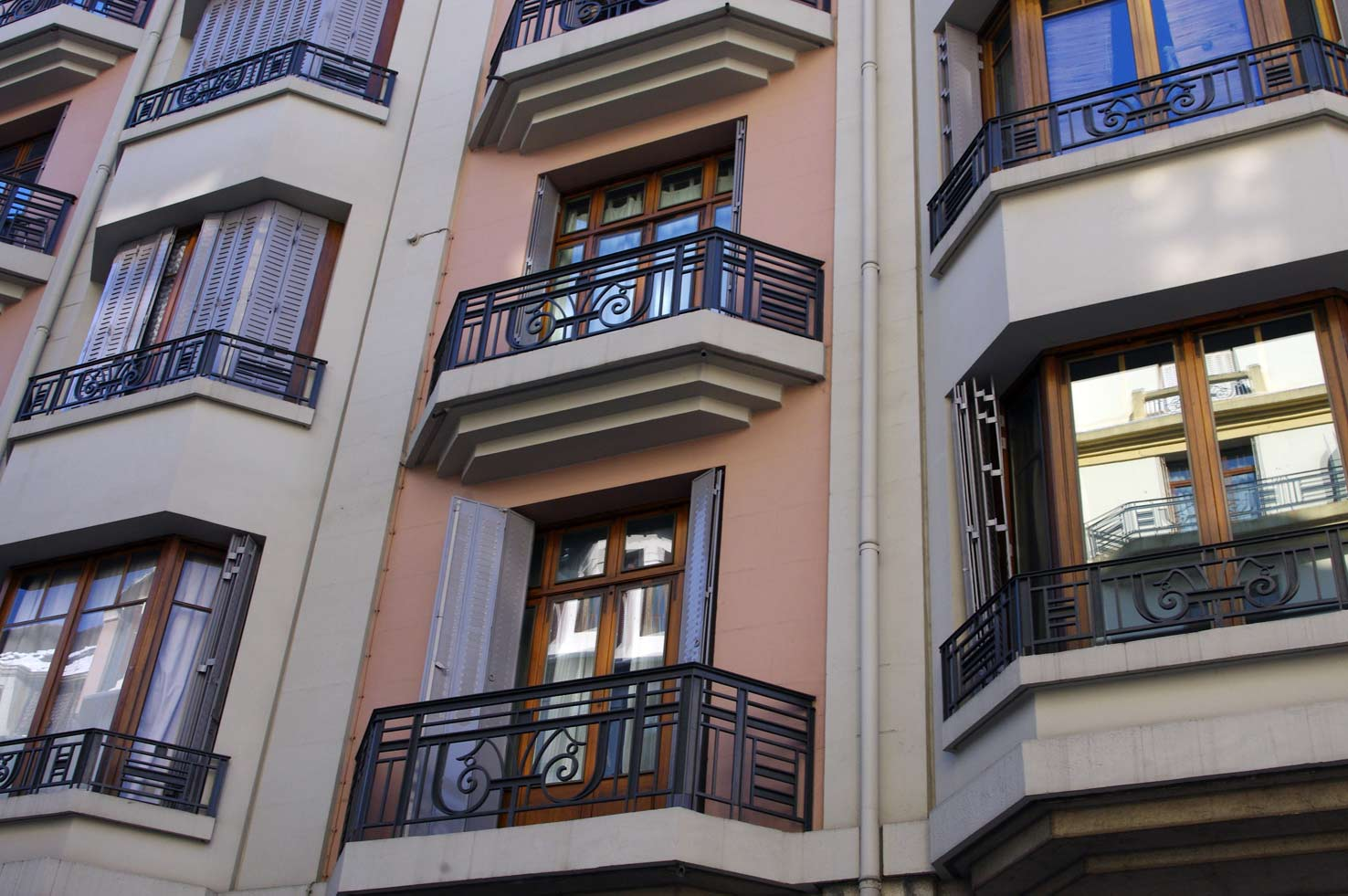
Art Deco balcony in Haute-Savoie, France

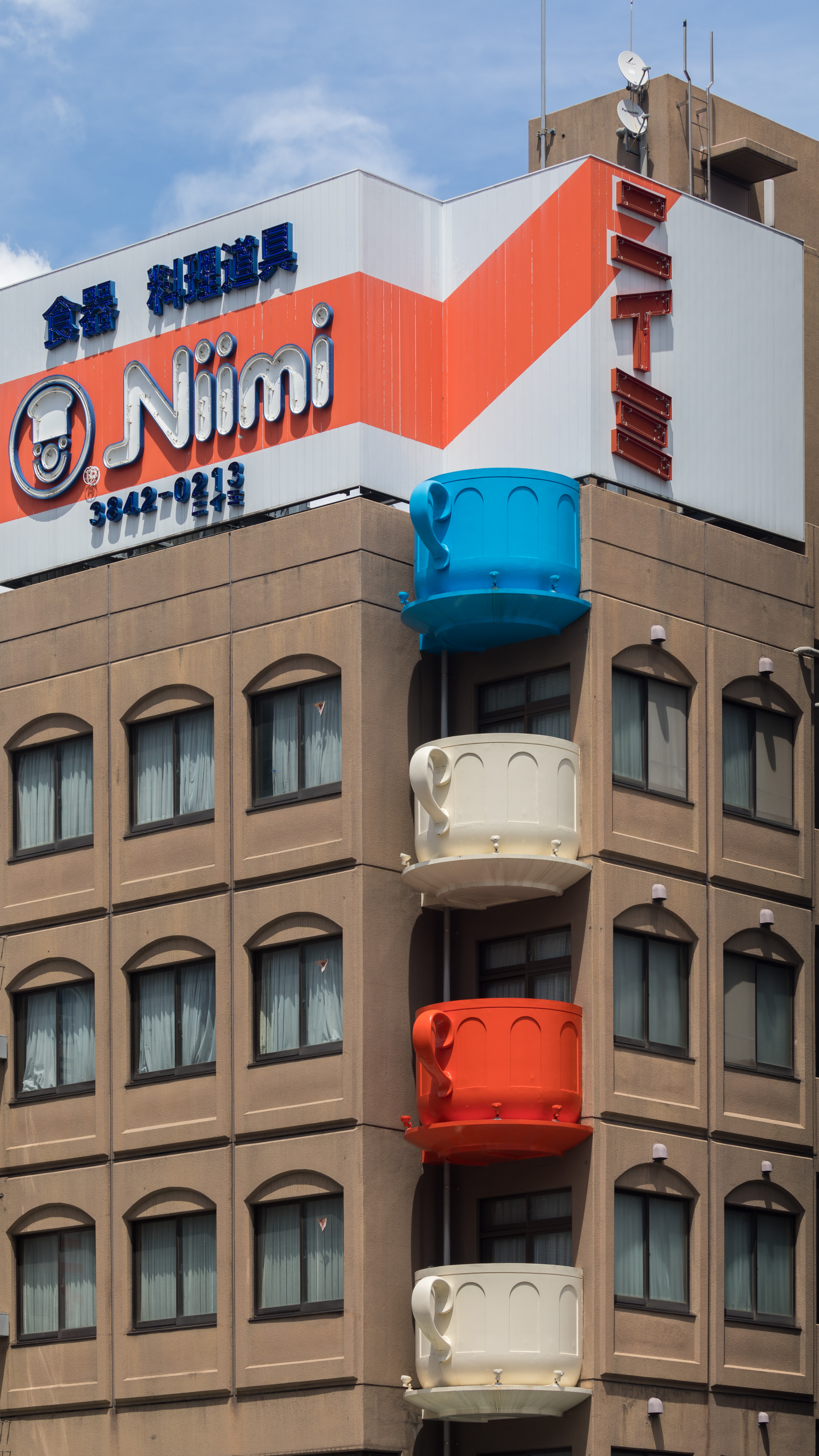
Postmodern coffee cup-shaped balconies in Tokyo, Japan

== See also ==
- Balconing
- Deck
- Jharokha
- Mashrabiya
- Mezzanine
- Minstrel's gallery
- Porch
- Verandah
