= Gallarija =

Maltese closed wooden balcony

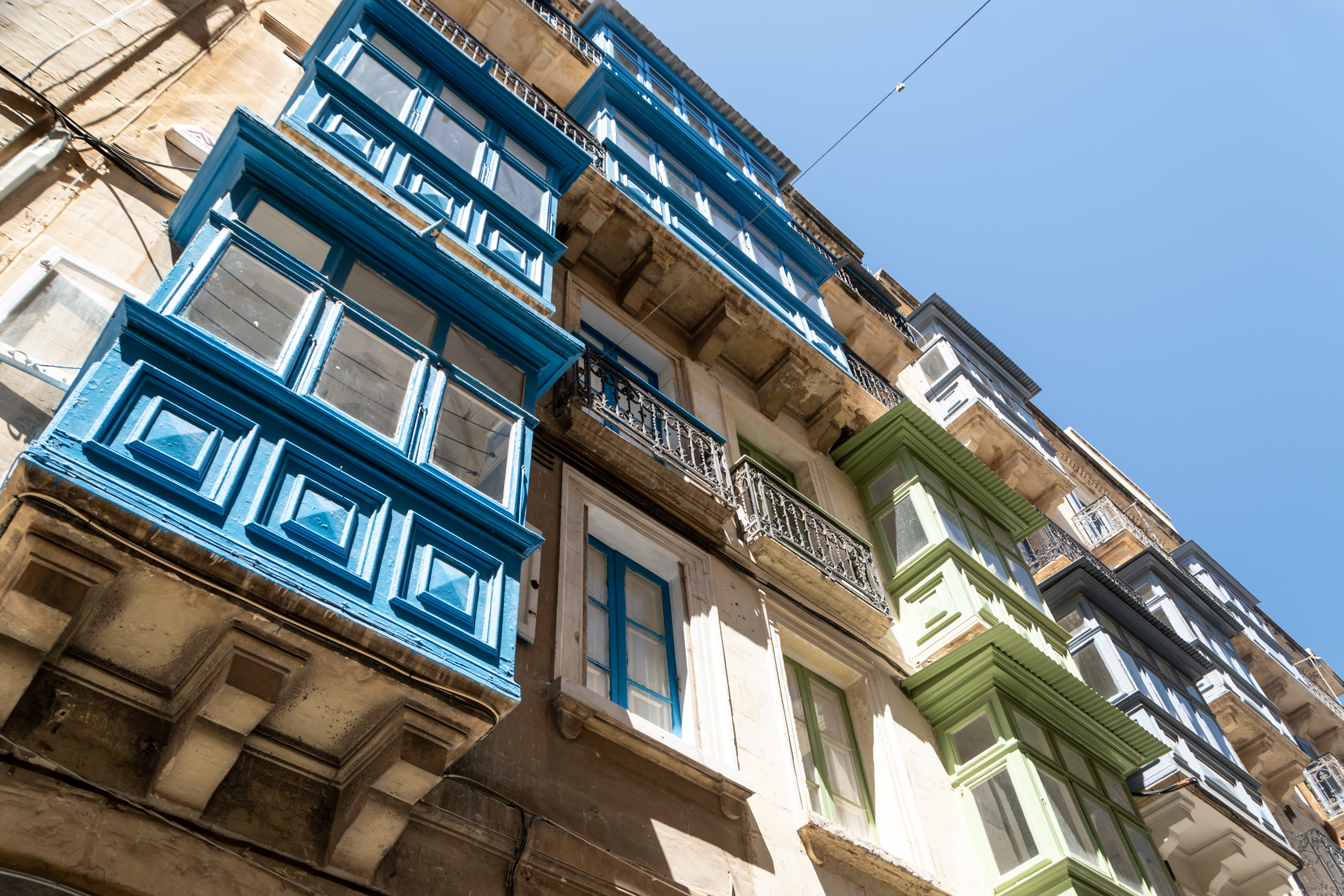

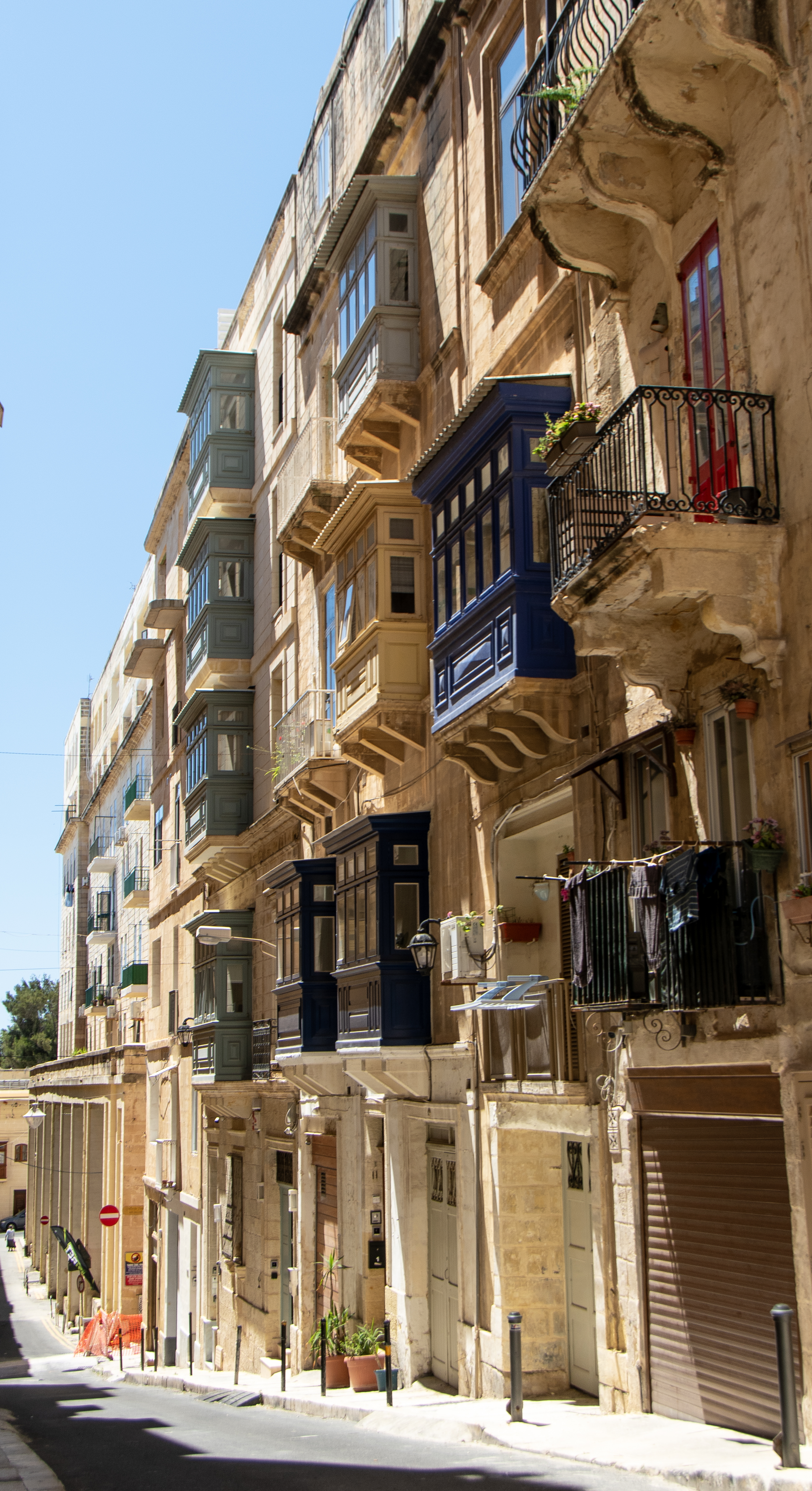
Gallariji in Valletta

The Gallarija (pl: gallariji) is a typical element of vernacular Maltese architecture, consisting of an ornate closed wooden balcony.

The term is of Italian origin, but with a shift in meaning (galleria, covered passage, vs balcone, balcony). The stone brackets or corbels that support the balcony are called saljaturi (it: sogliature vs mensole, beccattelli). The hinged glass flaps are purtelli (it: sportelli) and the blinds are called tendini (it: tendine)

== History ==
The gallarija is considered a descendant of the Maltese muxrabija, and it is closely related to the mashrabiya which are typical in Arabic architecture.

Yet, its use became widespread only in the 17th century, as not one of antique townscapes of Valletta and the harbour cities show any covered balcony. The earlier representation of a gallarija concerns the one that rounds the Old Theatre Street corner of the Grandmaster's Palace in Valletta, around the year 1675. In 1679 Sieur de Bachelier mentions in his description of the palace that “a glass-covered balcony joins all the rooms of this side of the building” [Old Theatre Street], and adds that “Today’s Grand Master [Nicholas Cottoner] willingly strolls there [through the balcony] without being seen, and discovers from his walk all that is happening in the two piazzas in front and at the side of his palace. If he sees two knights ambling together, he immediately perceives their thoughts and the subject of their conversation, as he knows the minds of all those he governs, and the secret practices of their intrigues.”

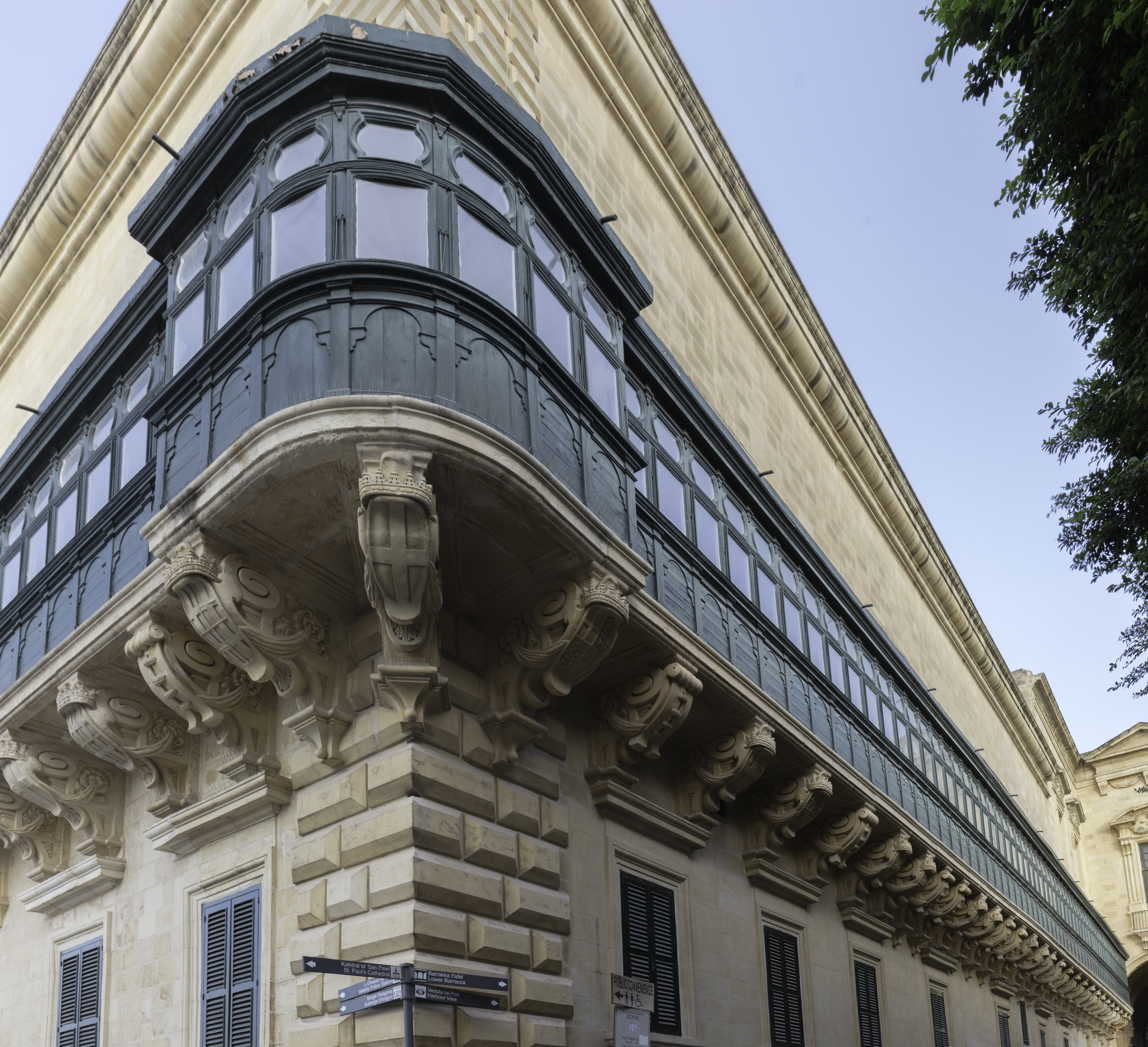
Extended gallarija at the Grandmaster's Palace, Valletta

The use of gallariji became widespread in Valletta and the Three Cities in the 18th century, in parallel with the spread of baroque. The architectural element was embellished by curve lines and elaborate stone corbels. The onset of the 20th century gave a new dimension to the Maltese balconies, which could now be designed in simpler Art Deco lines.

== Gallery ==
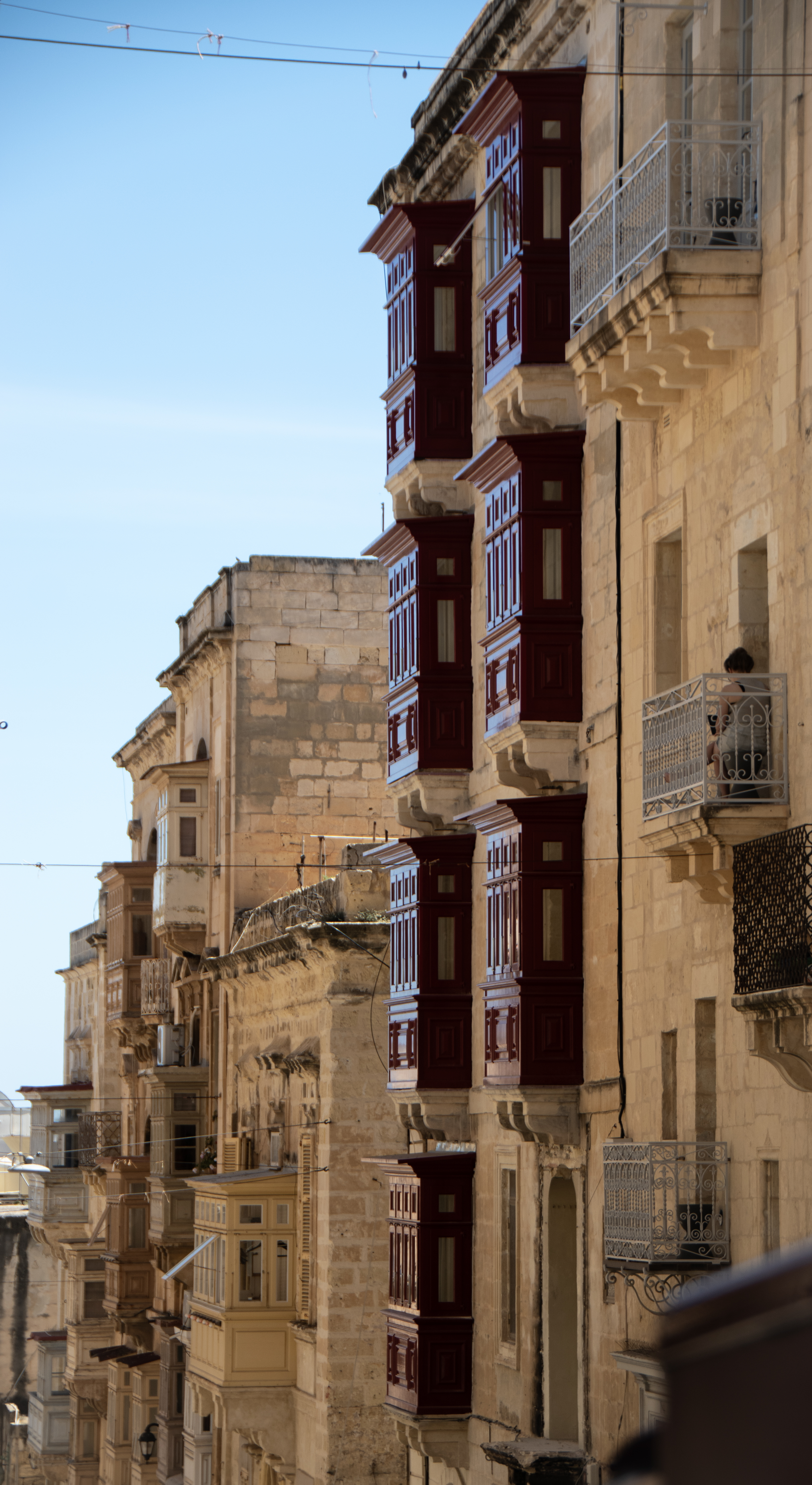
Identical gallariji, Valletta

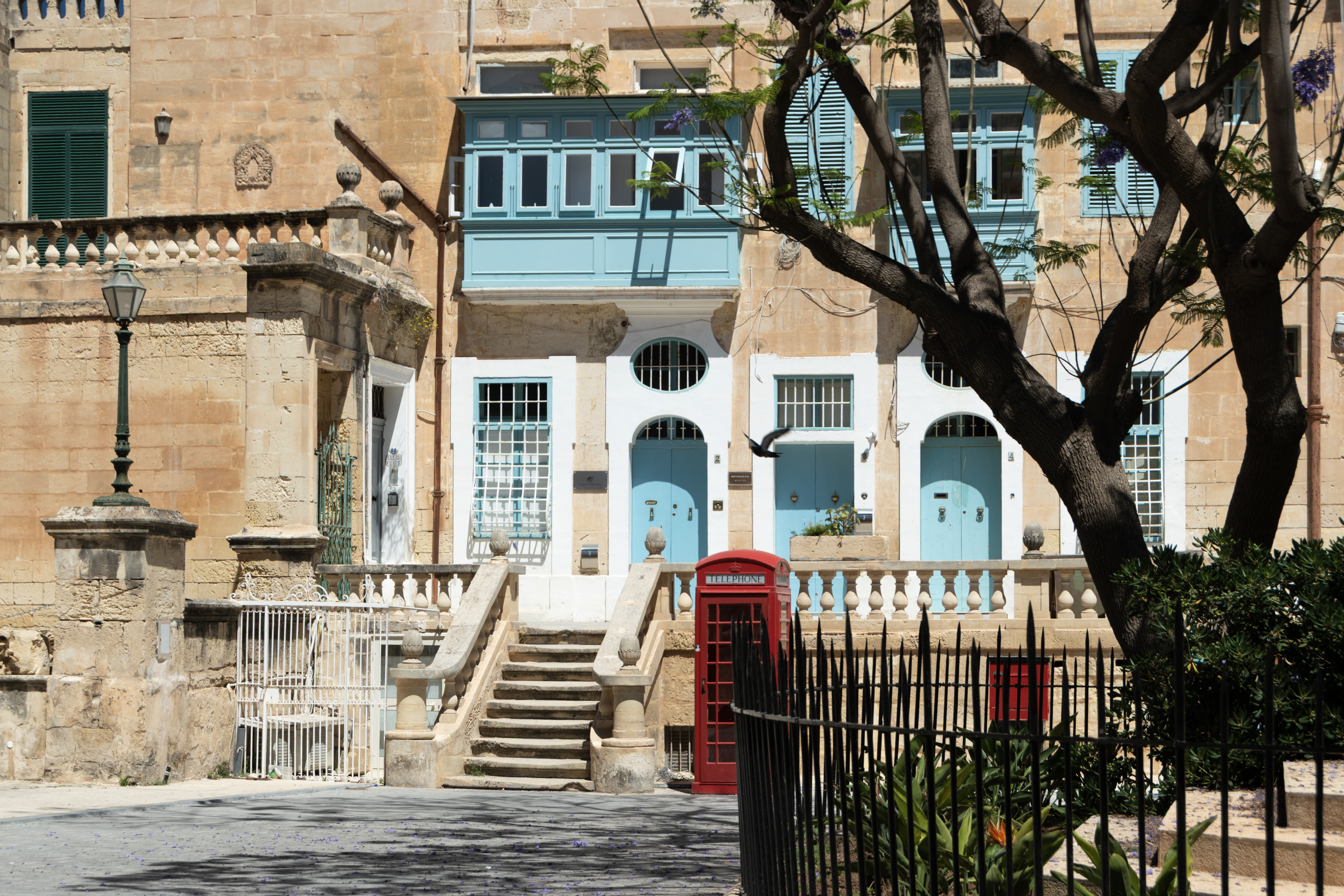
Gallariji on a building in Independence Square, Valletta

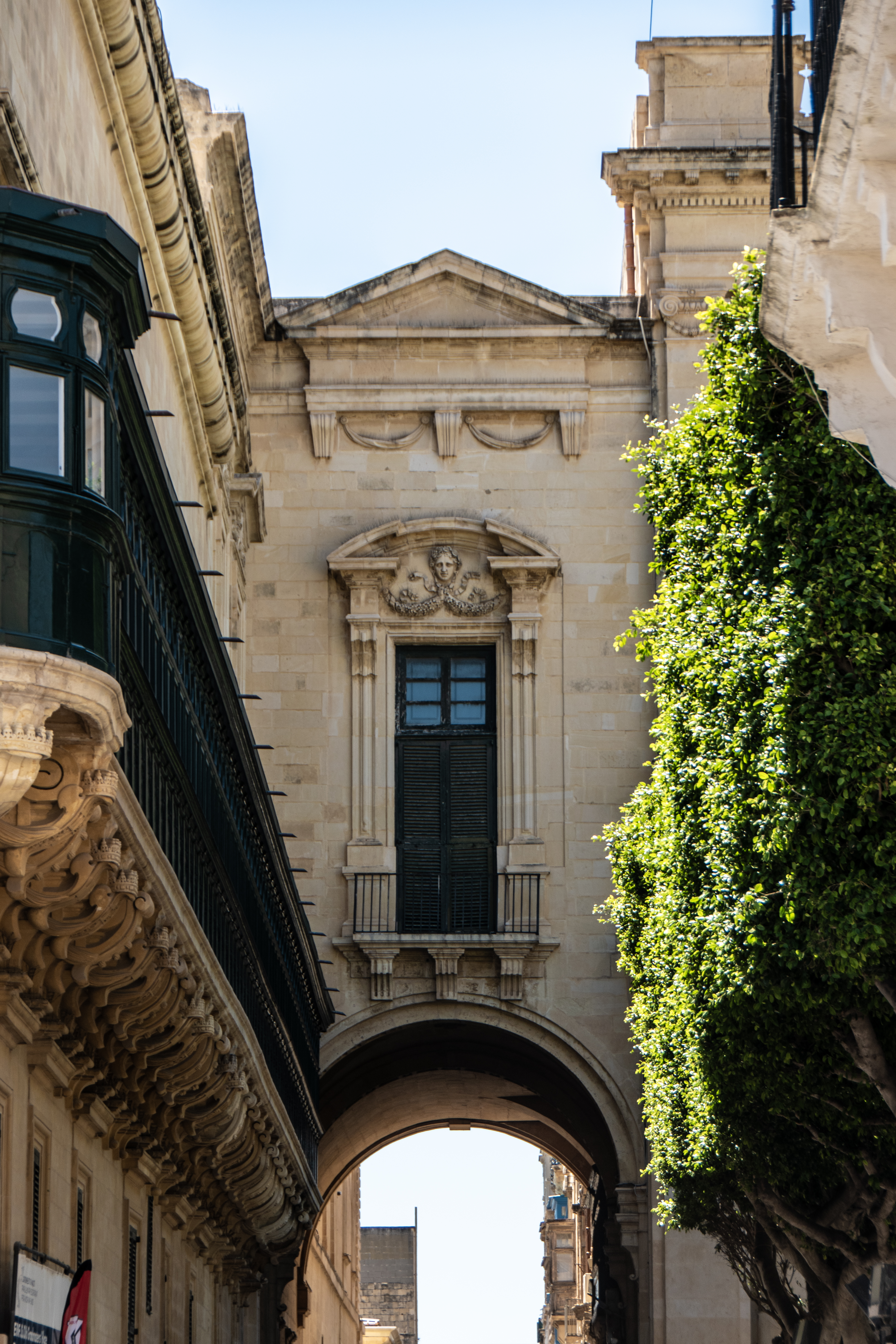
Extended gallarija used architecturally in conjunction with an archway on Old Theatre Street, Valletta

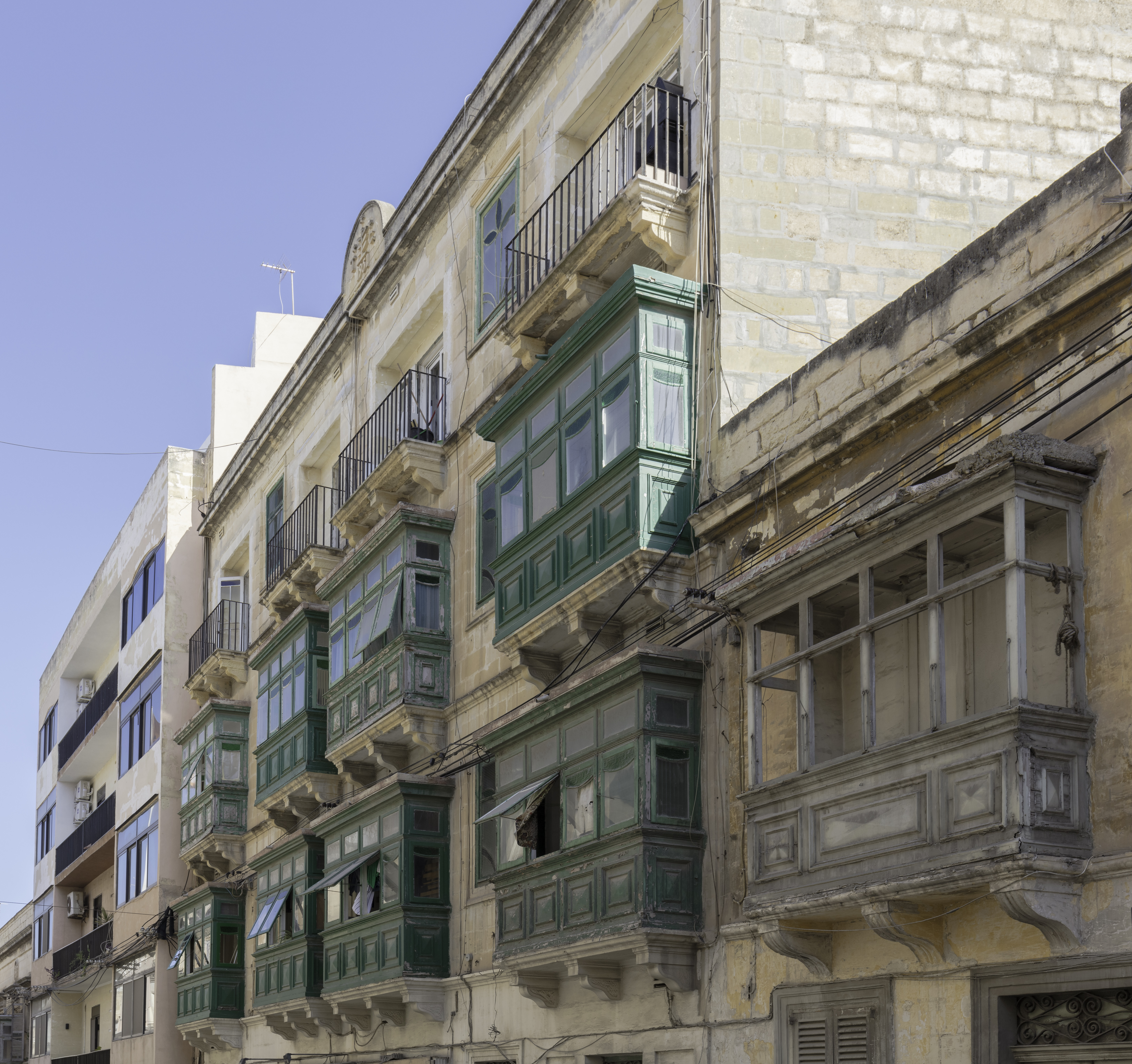
Gallariji on Manwel Dimech Street, Sliema

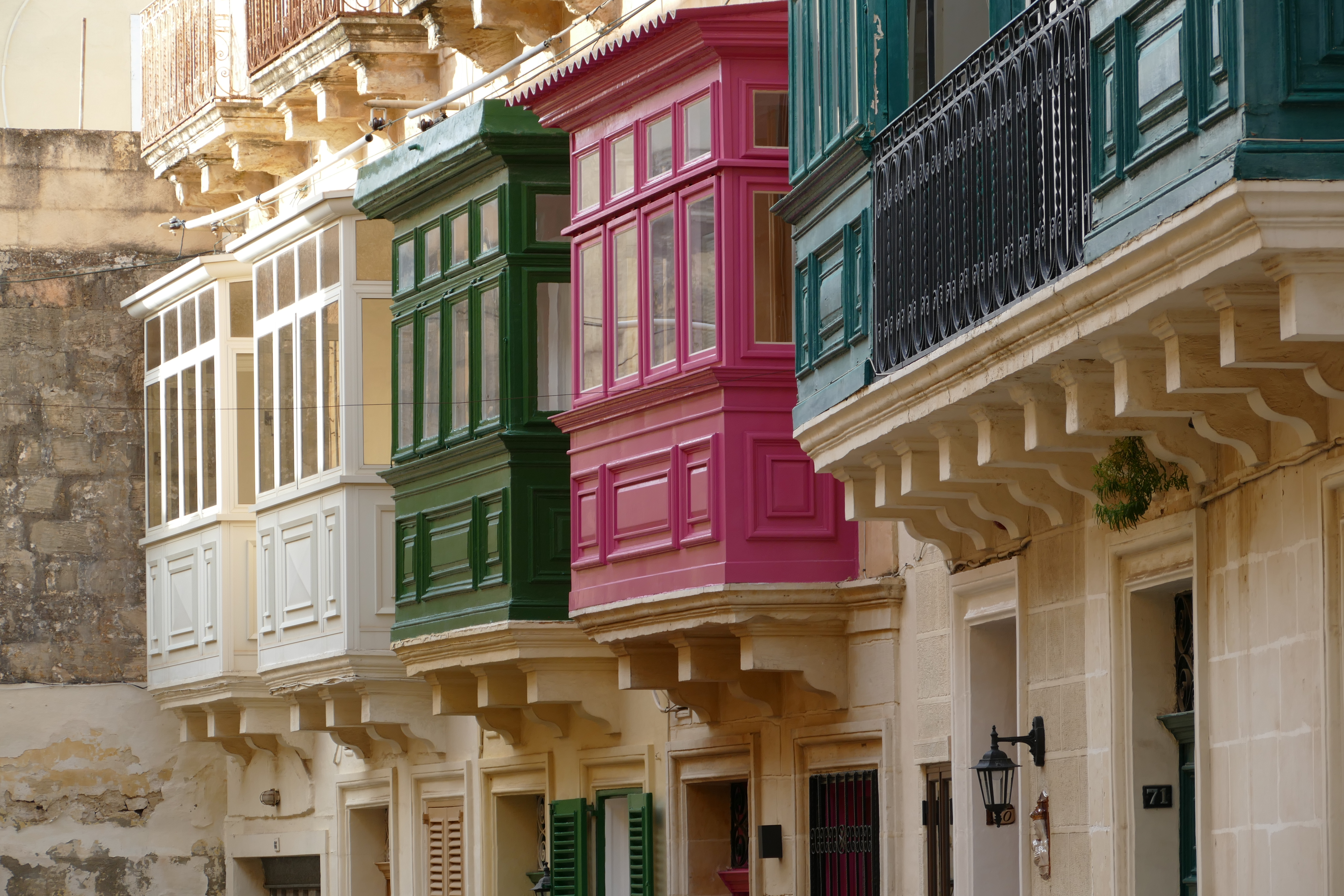
Gallariji in Rabat

== Bibliography ==
- Giovanni Bonello, Mysteries Of the Maltese ‘Gallarija’
- Cyrus Vakili-Zad (2014) Maltese ‘gallarija’: a gender and space perspective, European Review of History: Revue européenne d'histoire, 21:5, 729-747, DOI: 10.1080/13507486.2014.949632
